= Taupiri =

Town in Waikato, New Zealand

- Town
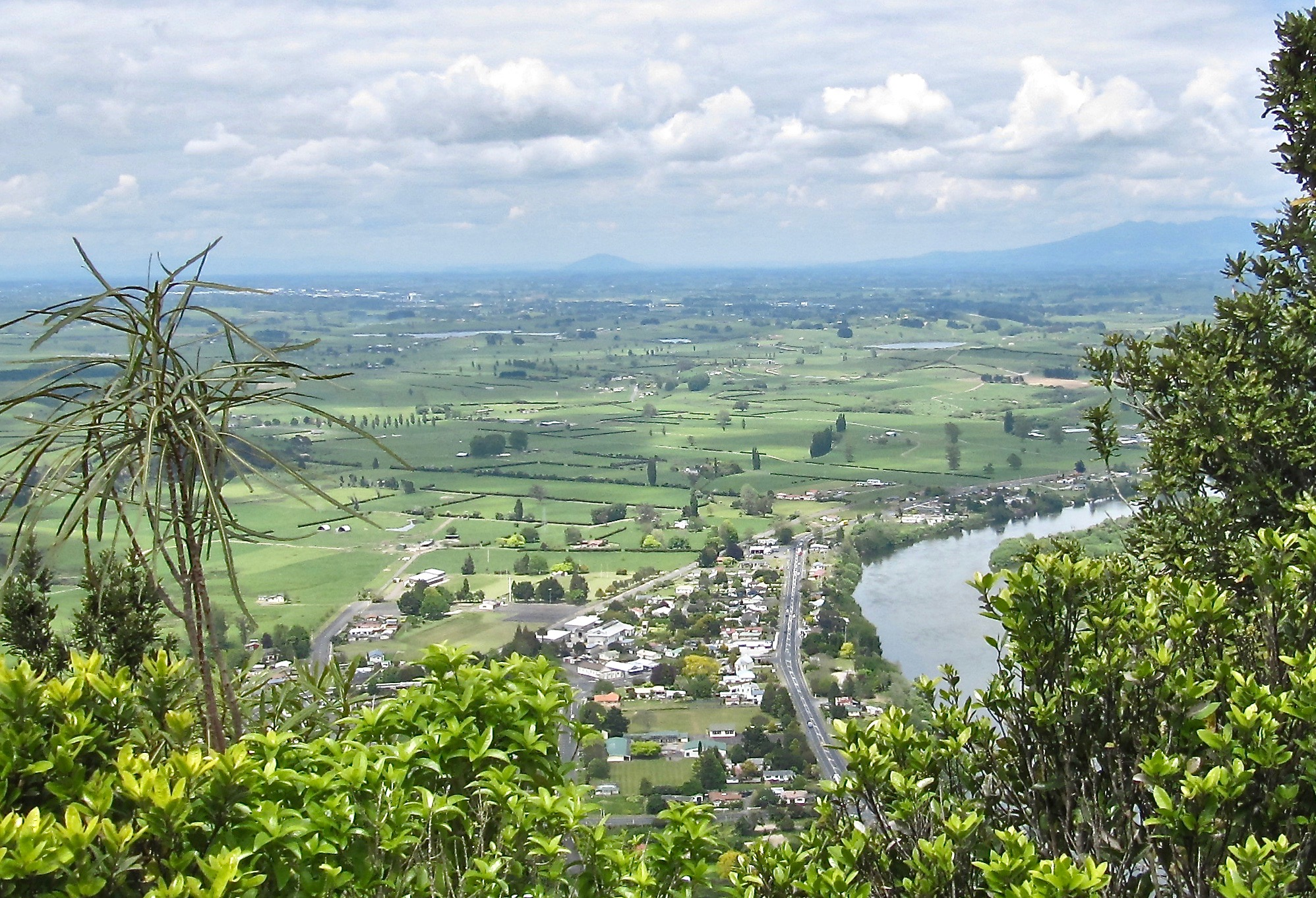
- 2010 view of Taupiri and the Waikato, with Kakepuku and Mount Pirongia in the background
- Interactive map of Taupiri
- Coordinates: 37°37′S 175°11′E
- Country: New Zealand
- Region: Waikato
- District: Waikato District
- Wards: Newcastle-Ngāruawāhia General Ward; Tai Runga Takiwaa Maaori Ward
- Community: Taupiri Community
- Electorates: Waikato; Hauraki-Waikato (Māori)

Government
  - Territorial Authority: Waikato District Council
  - Regional council: Waikato Regional Council
  - Mayor of Waikato: Aksel Bech
  - Waikato MP: Tim van de Molen
  - Hauraki-Waikato MP: Hana-Rawhiti Maipi-Clarke

Area
  - Total: 1.73 km^{2} (0.67 sq mi)

Population (June 2025)
  - Total: 720
  - Density: 420/km^{2} (1,100/sq mi)

Taupiri is a small town of about 500 people on the eastern bank of the Waikato River in the Waikato District of New Zealand. It is overlooked by Taupiri mountain, the sacred burial ground for the Waikato tribes of the Māori people, located just to the north.

Taupiri is located near the northern end of the Waikato Basin immediately south of the junction of the Mangawara Stream (which drains the northern part of the basin) and the Waikato River. The Waikato River then flows northward through the Taupiri Gorge between the Hakarimata Range to the south and the Taupiri Range to the north, into the Lower Waikato.

The North Island Main Trunk railway line runs through the town and the gorge, linking Huntly 8 kilometres to the north and Ngāruawāhia 7 kilometres to the south. State Highway 1 also ran through the town until the Huntly Bypass opened in March 2020.

== Demographics ==
Statistics New Zealand describes Taupiri as a rural settlement, which covers 1.73 km^{2} (0.67 sq mi) and had an estimated population of 720 as of June 2025, with a population density of 416 people per km^{2}. Taupiri is part of the larger Taupiri-Lake Kainui statistical area.

Historical population for Taupiri
| Year | Pop. | ±% p.a. |
|---|---|---|
| 2006 | 444 | — |
| 2013 | 417 | −0.89% |
| 2018 | 489 | +3.24% |
| 2023 | 663 | +6.28% |

Taupiri had a population of 663 in the 2023 New Zealand census, an increase of 174 people (35.6%) since the 2018 census, and an increase of 246 people (59.0%) since the 2013 census. There were 324 males and 336 females in 231 dwellings. 4.1% of people identified as LGBTIQ+. The median age was 33.8 years (compared with 38.1 years nationally). There were 144 people (21.7%) aged under 15 years, 141 (21.3%) aged 15 to 29, 291 (43.9%) aged 30 to 64, and 87 (13.1%) aged 65 or older.

People could identify as more than one ethnicity. The results were 67.9% European (Pākehā); 34.8% Māori; 4.1% Pasifika; 8.1% Asian; 0.5% Middle Eastern, Latin American and African New Zealanders (MELAA); and 4.5% other, which includes people giving their ethnicity as "New Zealander". English was spoken by 95.5%, Māori language by 12.2%, Samoan by 0.5%, and other languages by 8.1%. No language could be spoken by 2.3% (e.g. too young to talk). The percentage of people born overseas was 14.0, compared with 28.8% nationally.

Religious affiliations were 25.8% Christian, 3.2% Hindu, 0.9% Islam, 2.3% Māori religious beliefs, 1.4% Buddhist, 0.5% New Age, and 2.3% other religions. People who answered that they had no religion were 58.4%, and 7.2% of people did not answer the census question.

Of those at least 15 years old, 93 (17.9%) people had a bachelor's or higher degree, 276 (53.2%) had a post-high school certificate or diploma, and 147 (28.3%) people exclusively held high school qualifications. The median income was $46,400, compared with $41,500 nationally. 54 people (10.4%) earned over $100,000 compared to 12.1% nationally. The employment status of those at least 15 was that 294 (56.6%) people were employed full-time, 66 (12.7%) were part-time, and 18 (3.5%) were unemployed.

=== Taupiri-Lake Kainui statistical area ===
Taupiri-Lake Kainui statistical area extends southeast towards Horsham Downs. Since the 2018 census, the boundaries of Ngāruawāhia have enlarged to include some of this area. Taupiri-Lake Kainui covers 47.97 km^{2} (18.52 sq mi). It had an estimated population of 2,360 as of June 2025, with a population density of 49 people per km^{2}.

Historical population of Taupiri-Lake Kainui
| Year | Pop. | ±% p.a. |
|---|---|---|
| 2006 | 1,752 | — |
| 2013 | 1,650 | −0.85% |
| 2018 | 1,893 | +2.79% |
| 2023 | 2,232 | +3.35% |
The 2006 population is for a larger area of 49.76 km^{2}. Source:

Taupiri-Lake Kainui had a population of 2,232 in the 2023 New Zealand census, an increase of 339 people (17.9%) since the 2018 census, and an increase of 582 people (35.3%) since the 2013 census. There were 1,119 males, 1,110 females and 3 people of other genders in 753 dwellings. 2.6% of people identified as LGBTIQ+. The median age was 38.2 years (compared with 38.1 years nationally). There were 450 people (20.2%) aged under 15 years, 429 (19.2%) aged 15 to 29, 1,059 (47.4%) aged 30 to 64, and 294 (13.2%) aged 65 or older.

People could identify as more than one ethnicity. The results were 75.7% European (Pākehā); 27.6% Māori; 3.0% Pasifika; 5.6% Asian; 0.8% Middle Eastern, Latin American and African New Zealanders (MELAA); and 3.1% other, which includes people giving their ethnicity as "New Zealander". English was spoken by 96.5%, Māori language by 9.5%, Samoan by 0.1%, and other languages by 6.9%. No language could be spoken by 2.0% (e.g. too young to talk). New Zealand Sign Language was known by 0.4%. The percentage of people born overseas was 13.0, compared with 28.8% nationally.

Religious affiliations were 32.0% Christian, 0.8% Hindu, 0.7% Islam, 1.5% Māori religious beliefs, 0.5% Buddhist, 0.4% New Age, and 2.0% other religions. People who answered that they had no religion were 55.6%, and 6.6% of people did not answer the census question.

Of those at least 15 years old, 336 (18.9%) people had a bachelor's or higher degree, 1,023 (57.4%) had a post-high school certificate or diploma, and 429 (24.1%) people exclusively held high school qualifications. The median income was $47,300, compared with $41,500 nationally. 258 people (14.5%) earned over $100,000 compared to 12.1% nationally. The employment status of those at least 15 was that 1,002 (56.2%) people were employed full-time, 237 (13.3%) were part-time, and 51 (2.9%) were unemployed.

== History and culture ==
=== Pre-European history ===
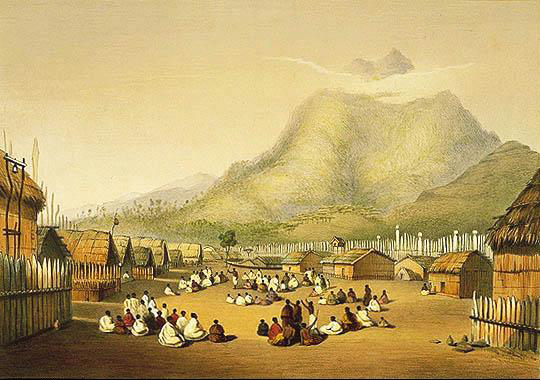
Kaitotehe, the pā of Pōtatau Te Wherowhero, with Mount Taupiri in the background (Angas 1846)

Until sometime in the 19th century, a large Māori village or town, Kaitotehe, stood on the flat land on the other side of the river, below the Hakarimata Range.

In early years it was the headquarters of Ngāti Mahuta. Te Putu built Taupiri pā on the summit of a spur of Taupiri mountain, in the 17th century. When Te Putu was killed, he was buried at the pā, which thus became tapu (sacred) and was abandoned. Early European travellers in the area were obliged by Māori to cross to the other side of the Waikato River to avoid the sacred area. In the early 19th century, Kaitotehe was the home of Pōtatau Te Wherowhero, the paramount chief of Ngāti Mahuta who became the first Māori King.

=== Post-European history ===
Taupiri township was settled by Europeans in the 1870s (a railway station opened in 1877), and became a farming centre, with flax mills and a sawmill. A dairy factory was built in 1921, then a larger one in 1930.

In the 2006 census, 32 per cent of the population were Māori.

=== Marae ===
Taupiri Marae is located in Taupiri. It is a meeting ground for the Waikato Tainui hapū of Ngāti Kuiaarangi, Ngāti Mahuta, Ngāti Tai and Ngāti Whāwhākia, and includes the Pani Ora and Te Puna Tangata meeting houses.

== Education ==
Taupiri School is a co-educational state primary school for Year 1 to 8 students, with a roll of 112 as of July 2026. The school opened in 1878.

Taupiri Mission School operated from 1843 to 1863.
