= Mount Pirongia =

Extinct volcano in Waikato district of New Zealand

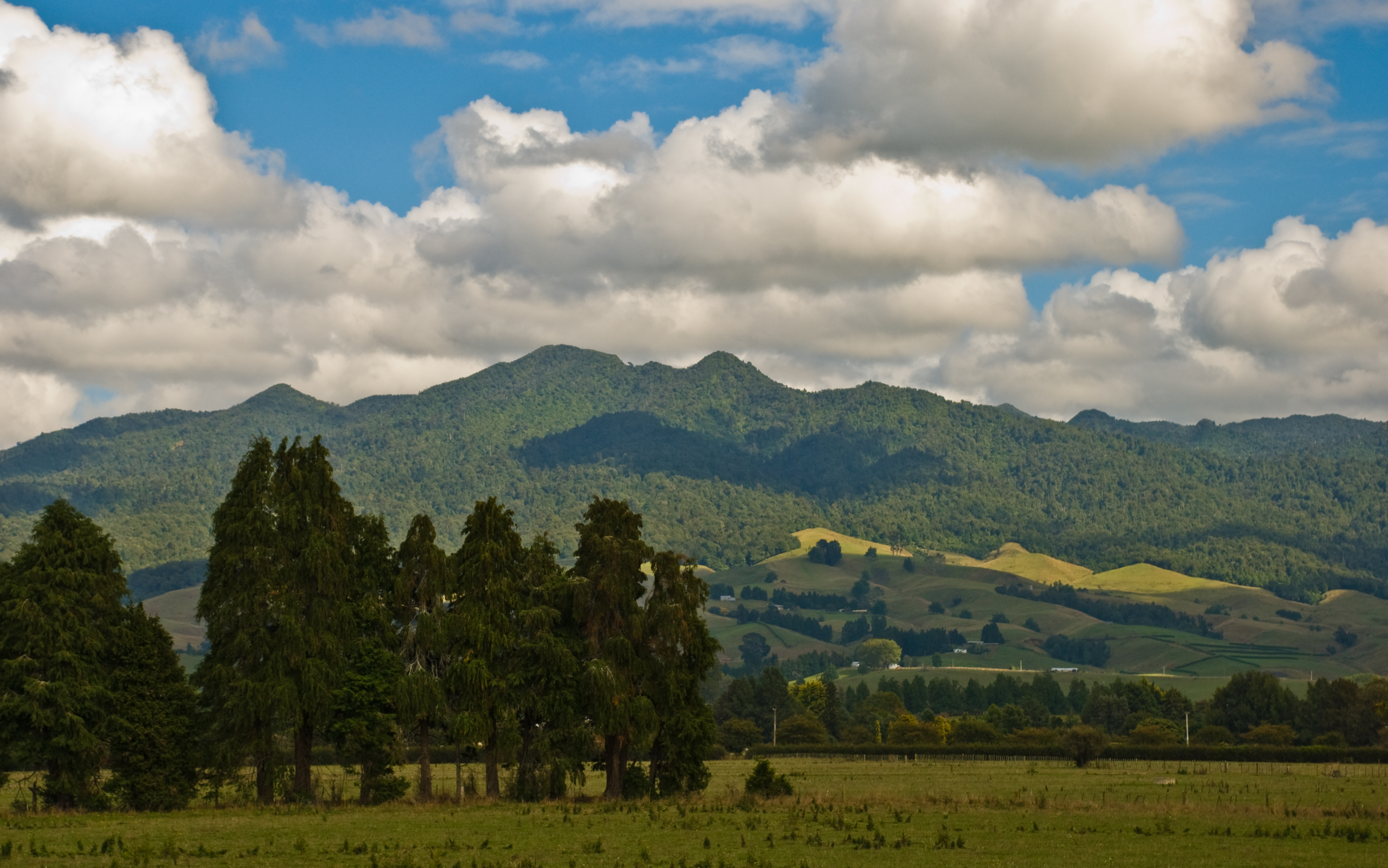
- Mt. Pirongia, 4 April 2008

Highest point
- Elevation: 959 m (3,146 ft)
- Coordinates: 37°59′28″S 175°05′21″E

Dimensions
- Width: 13 km (8.1 mi)
- Area: 175 km^{2} (68 sq mi)

Naming
- English translation: "Pirongia te aroaro o Kahu" - The scented pathway of Kahu

Geography
- Map of selected volcanic features near Mount Pirongia (green marker). In particular the massive debris avalanche towards the south east is well shown. Clicking on the map enlarges it, and enables mouseover of volcano feature/wikilink and ages if available in brackets. The type of basaltic volcanic eruption (some are composite over their eruptive history) is indicated by red being arc basalts, pink being ring basalts of stratovolcanoes and brown being intra-arc basalts typical of those produced by monogenetic volcanic fields. Approximate location of characterised vents are black rectangles with red centres.'"`UNIQ--ref-00000007-QINU`"''"`UNIQ--ref-00000008-QINU`"' For wider context see map at North Island Surface Volcanism.
- Location: North Island, New Zealand
- Parent range: Hakarimata Range
- Topo map: NZMS 260 S15 Te Awamutu

Geology
- Rock age: late Pliocene to early Pleistocene (2.54–1.6 Ma)
- Mountain type: Stratovolcano (extinct)
- Last eruption: 1.6 million years ago

Mount Pirongia is an extinct stratovolcano located in the Waikato region of New Zealand's North Island. It rises to 959 m (3,146 ft) and is the highest peak around the Waikato plains. Pirongia's many peaks are basaltic cones created by successive volcanic eruptions between the late Pliocene and early Pleistocene, about 2.5 million years ago. In the adjacent picture, the characteristic profile of the mountain can be seen, along with a prominent accessory cone to the right (on the northern flank).

== History ==
The Māori people of the Tainui waka (Ngāti Maniapoto, Waikato Tainui, Ngāti Hikairo) have strong whakapapa-based links to Mount Pirongia. The mountain was first encountered after landfall of the Tainui waka around 800 years ago. Early names bestowed on the mountain included Paewhenua (the land barrier, given by Rakātaura) and Pukehoua (now given to a flank cone on the eastern side of the mountain). The present name is:"Te Pirongia o Te Aroaro ō Kahu", which translates to 'the putrid stench of Kahu', or more gently, the 'scented pathway of Kahu'. This name originates from Kahupekapeka (a Tainui tupuna), who following the death of her husband Uenga (descendent of the ariki Hoturoa), left Kāwhia with her son Rākamaomao and travelled inland, naming many peaks across the Waikato region. Kahupekapeka searched the bush on Pirongia for rongoā rākau (medicinal plants) to heal her body, which was afflicted by the miscarriage of her unborn child with Uenga.

To preserve the heritage of Mount Pirongia, Pirongia Te Aroaro o Kahu Restoration Society Inc was formed in 2002 as a result of deep-seated community interest in its ecological restoration. During 2001 DoC had invited nominations for a working group. The Society evolved from a hui at Pūrekireki Marae on 20 April 2002. The Māori people have a strong connection to Mount Pirongia.

On 18 December 2024, the name of Pirongia's second tallest peak, The Cone, was formally changed to Pūāwhē by the New Zealand Geographic Board.

== Geography ==
Mount Pirongia is located 20 km (12 mi) to the west of Te Awamutu and 8 km (5.0 mi) from the small settlement of Pirongia, and lies in the Pirongia Forest Park. It is clearly visible from the Tasman Sea, being just 25 km (16 mi) from the coast at Aotea Harbour.

=== Geology ===
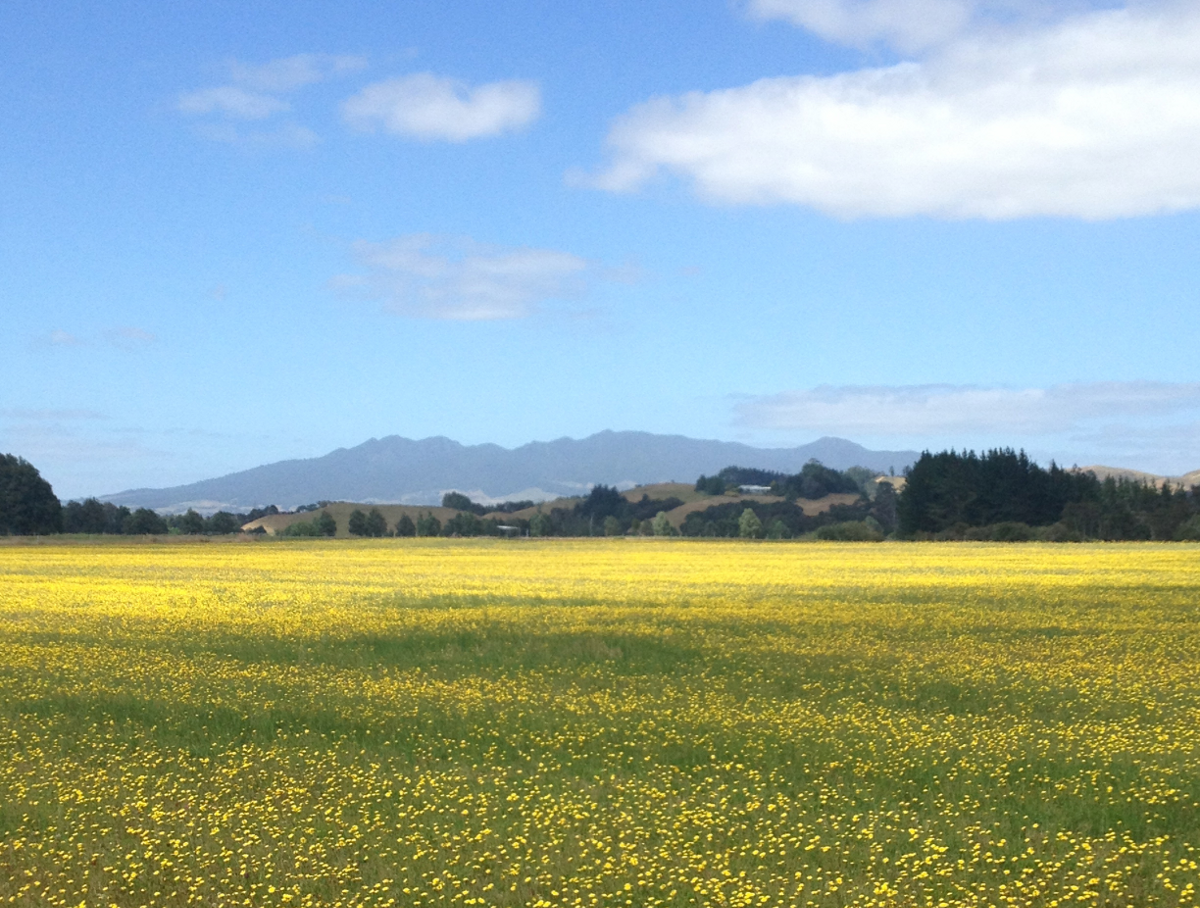
Mount Pirongia viewed from a distance (approx Feb 2013); the profile is clearly shown as is the secondary cone to the right of the mountain.

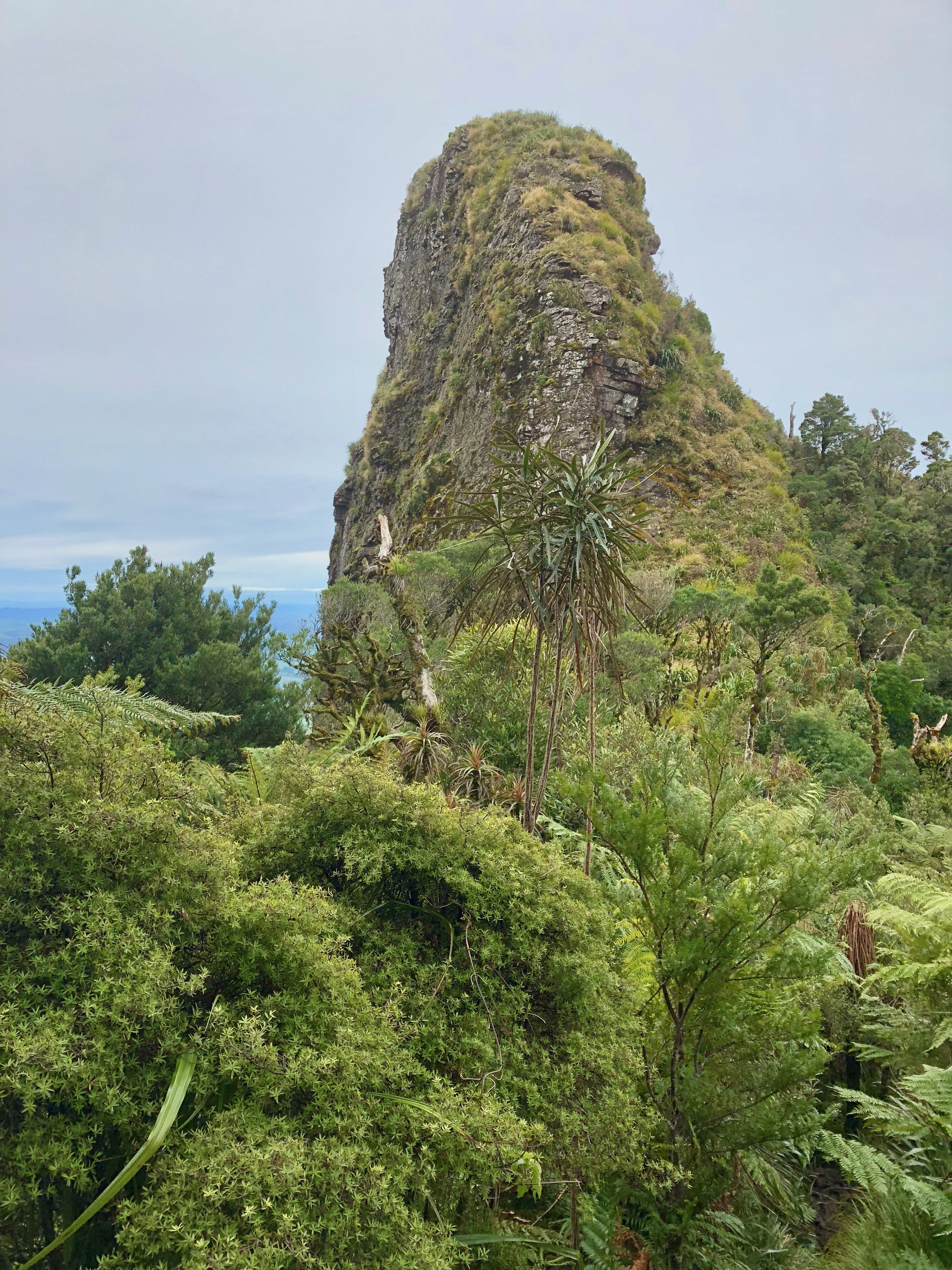
The Tirohanga Track skirts the foot of the hornblende andesite dike

Mount Pirongia is the largest stratovolcano in the Alexandra Volcanic Group chain which extends inland from Mount Karioi near Raglan. It is a mainly basaltic volcano, though andesite dykes form the peaks of Wharauroa, Mahaukura, Tirohanga, Pirongia Summit and The Cone. To the west it merges into the highland terrain of the Karioi horst block and in the east it arises above the Hamilton Basin, a major rift-related depression bound by the Waipa Fault Zone. There are at least six edifice-forming members separated by features including those resulting from large volume collapse events. The largest debris avalanche (the Oparau breccia) cascaded at least 25 km southwest from Pirongia into the Kawhia Harbour and was larger in volume (3.3 km^{3}) than the Mt. St. Helens collapse of 1980 (2.5 km^{3}). The collapse was followed by late-stage eruptions from the summit area around 1.6 Ma. The mountain contains unusually crystal-rich lavas of (ankaramite basalt) that also occur on Karioi, Kakepuku and Te Kawa but are not found elsewhere in New Zealand.

Pirongia event history
Time	Deposit name	Comment
1.60 ± 0.04 Ma	Pirongia	Current summit, also peripheral basaltic eruption 1.64 ± 0.13 Ma on flanks
Approx. 1.65 Ma	Oparau	Collapse volume 3.3 km^{3} (0.79 cu mi)
Approx. 2 Ma	Hiwikiwi	Collapse and peripheral basaltic eruption 2.03 ± 0.03 Ma
2.25 to 2.13 Ma	Hiwikiwi	2.30 ± 0.005 Ma Hikurangi
2.35 ± 0.2 Ma	Ruapane	
2.396 ± 0.005 Ma	Mahaukura	Mahaukura edifice . Central vent is Tirohanga Peak, which is andesitic, as are Mahaukura Bluffs. Ruapane Peak is ankaramite.
2.54 to 2.418	Paewhenua	

=== Land use ===
Mount Pirongia is a popular place for hunters from Hamilton seeking a quick day trip hunt, holding several feral goat herds on its bush-clad slopes. Rumours abound about small numbers of red deer released by farmers after an earlier deer farming boom went bust. Pirongia Forest Park is administered by the Waikato DoC office in Hamilton.

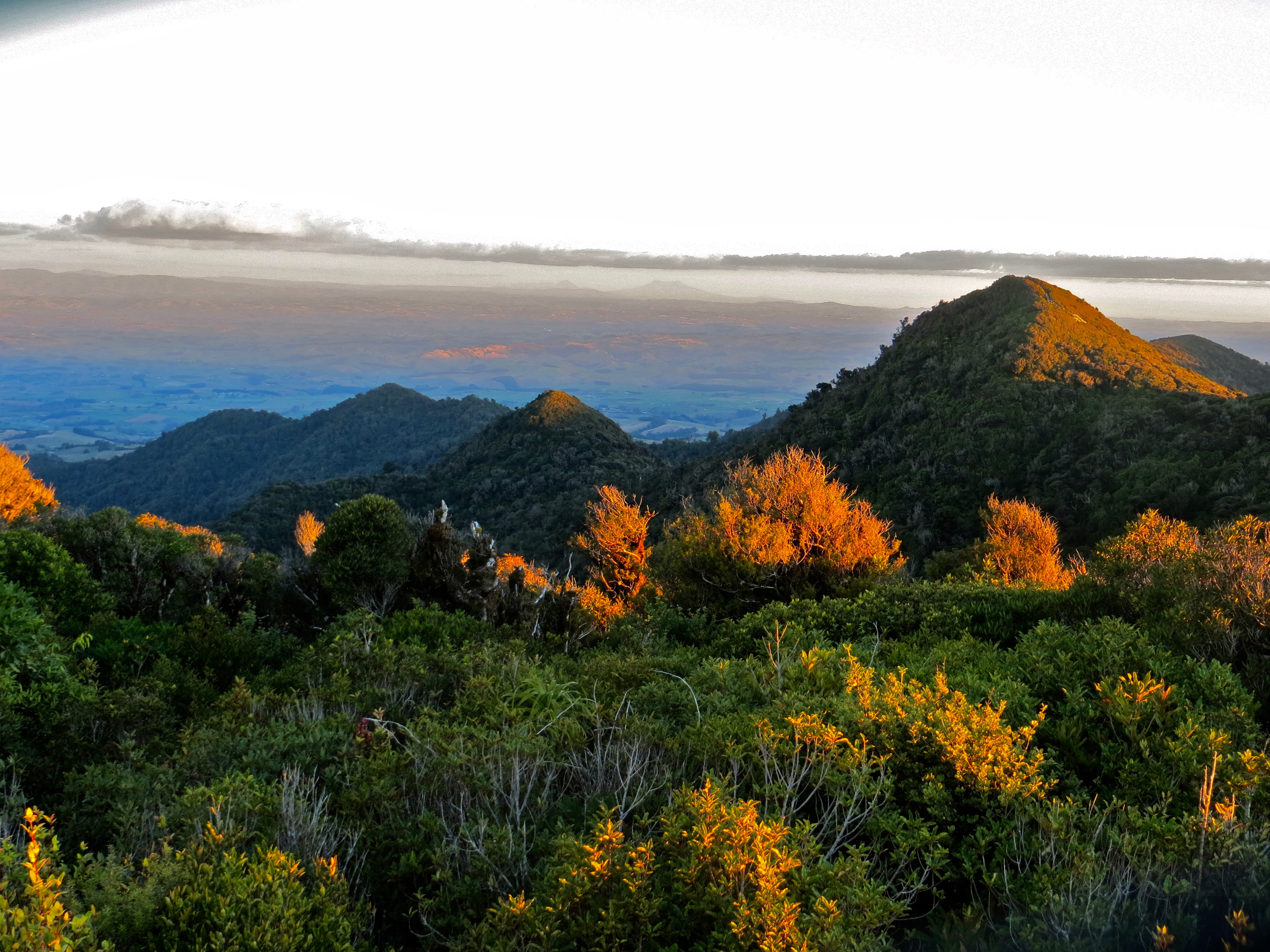
Central plateau from near Pāhautea Hut at sunset

== Ecology ==
Threatened plants include king fern, carmine rātā, thismia rodwayi and Wood Rose or Dactylanthus taylorii, a rare and endangered parasitic flowering plant, found on the ridges of Mount Pirongia. Near the summit there are mountain flax, coprosmas and ferns. Botanically, Mount Pirongia is also interesting area as it marks the transition between the warmth-loving kauri forest of the north and the beech and podocarp-beech forest in the south. The park's latitude is the naturally occurring southern limit for kauri, mangeao, mairehau, tāwari and taraire.

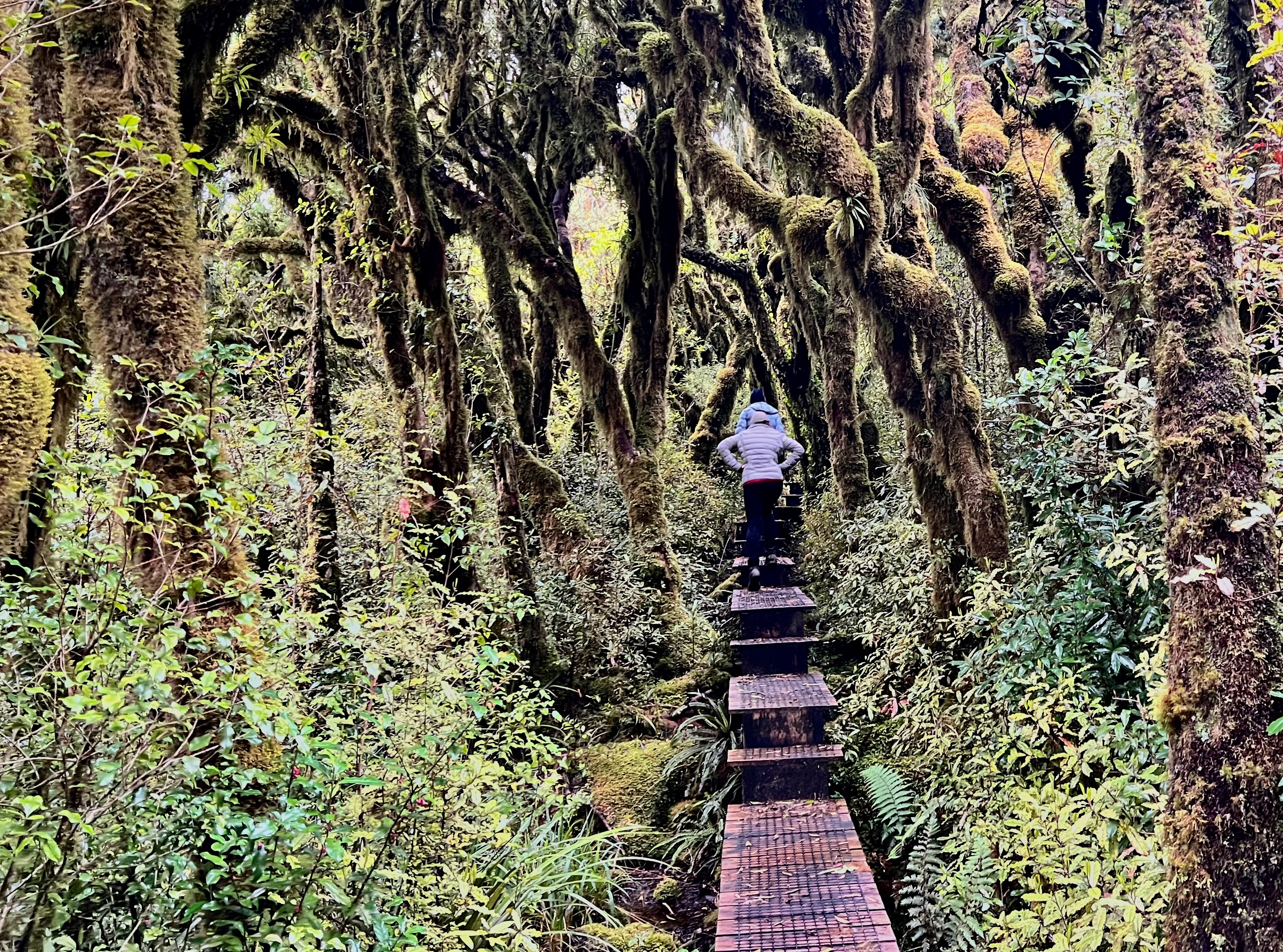
Bell Track boardwalk in pāhautea grove. It is gradually being extended towards The Cone.

The canopy in the podocarp forest of the lower slopes is tawa, with scattered rimu, kohekohe and a few other trees. The subcanopy has tree ferns, including wheki and ponga, and nikau palm, with pigeonwood (porokaiwhiri), hīnau, pukatea, supplejack (kareao), māhoe, hangehange, kanono and toropapa. Rātā replaces kohekohe at higher levels, until a change to upland forest (dominated by kāmahi, tawheowheo and tāwari) at about 650 m (2,130 ft). Above that, kāmahi, tāwari and tawheowheo become more prominent until at 750 m (2,460 ft) tawa is very rare. Above 800 m (2,600 ft) there are also scattered Hall's totara, miro, rātā and horopito, and, near the summit, pāhautea (at its northern limit on the west coast), but no rimu. Rocky summit pinnacles have the sub alpine species snow tōtara and eyebright (Euphrasia revoluta).

Commonly found birds are: pīwakawaka, kōtare, tūī, kererū and kārearea. In 2019 funding was won for reintroduction of kōkako.

=== Pest control ===
Possums and goats have been controlled since 1996, brown and black rats since 2006 and mustelids since 2019, using traps and goat, deer and pig hunters. About 1,000 goats were culled in 2021-22. 1080 drops in 2007, 2014 and 2020 were effective in reducing possum numbers. The Pirongia-aroaro-o-Kahu Restoration Society has a network of bait stations on the north east side of Pirongia.

== Recreation ==
=== Tracks ===
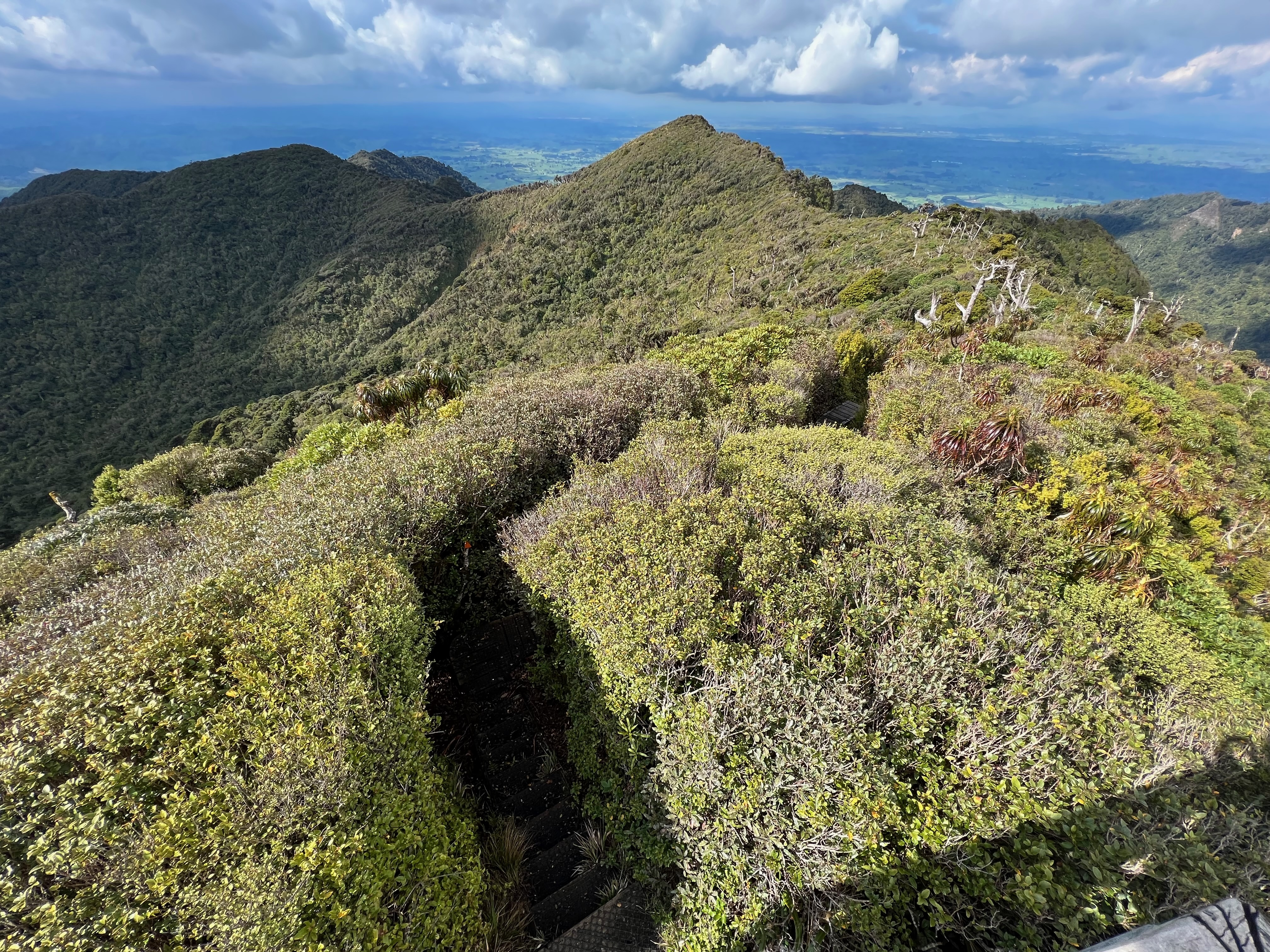
From Pirongia summit looking east. Mahaukura, Tirohanga and Tahuanui Tracks share this final section

==== Summit tracks ====
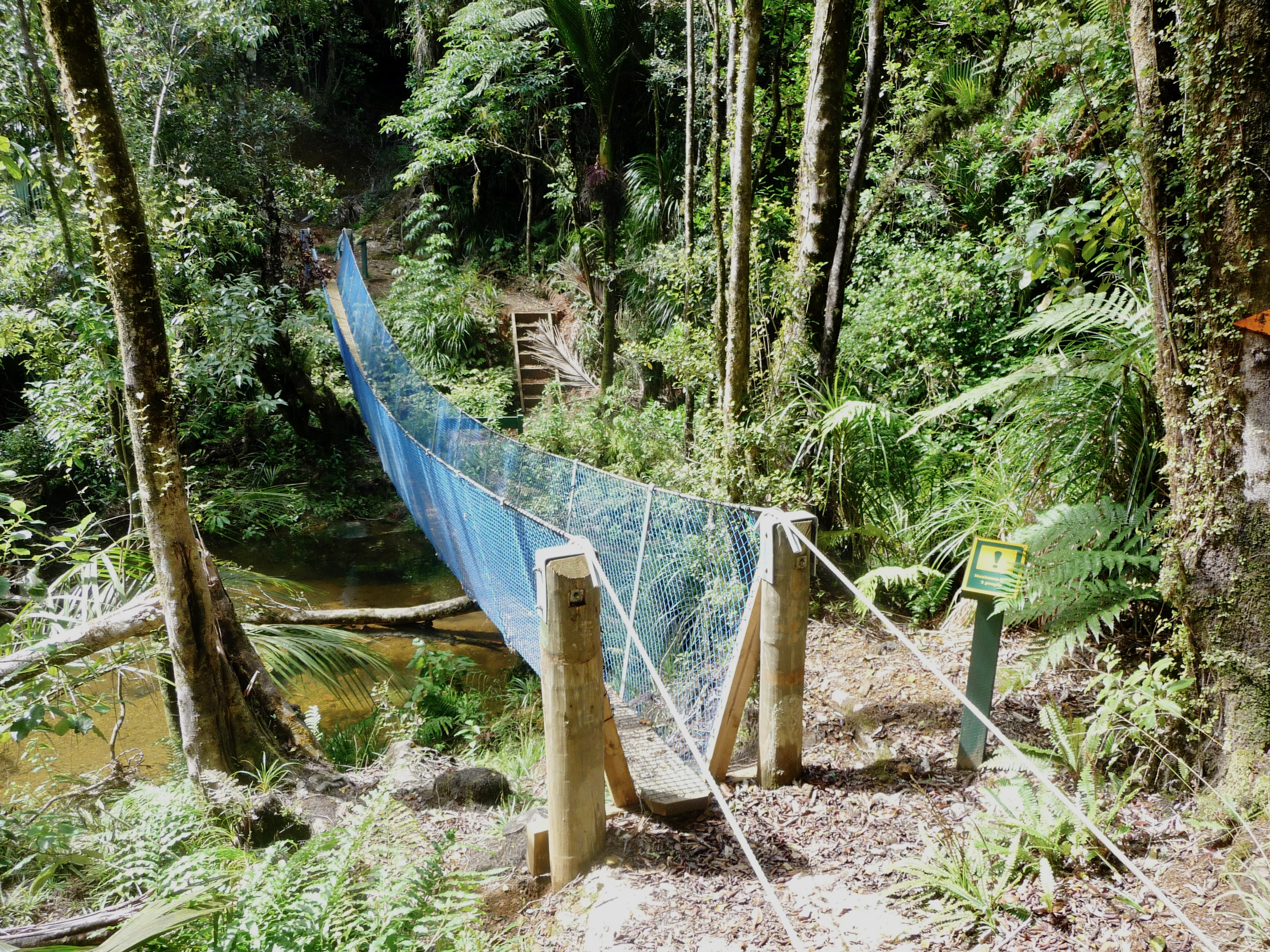
Blue Bill Stream bridge, where the Bell Track leaves the valley

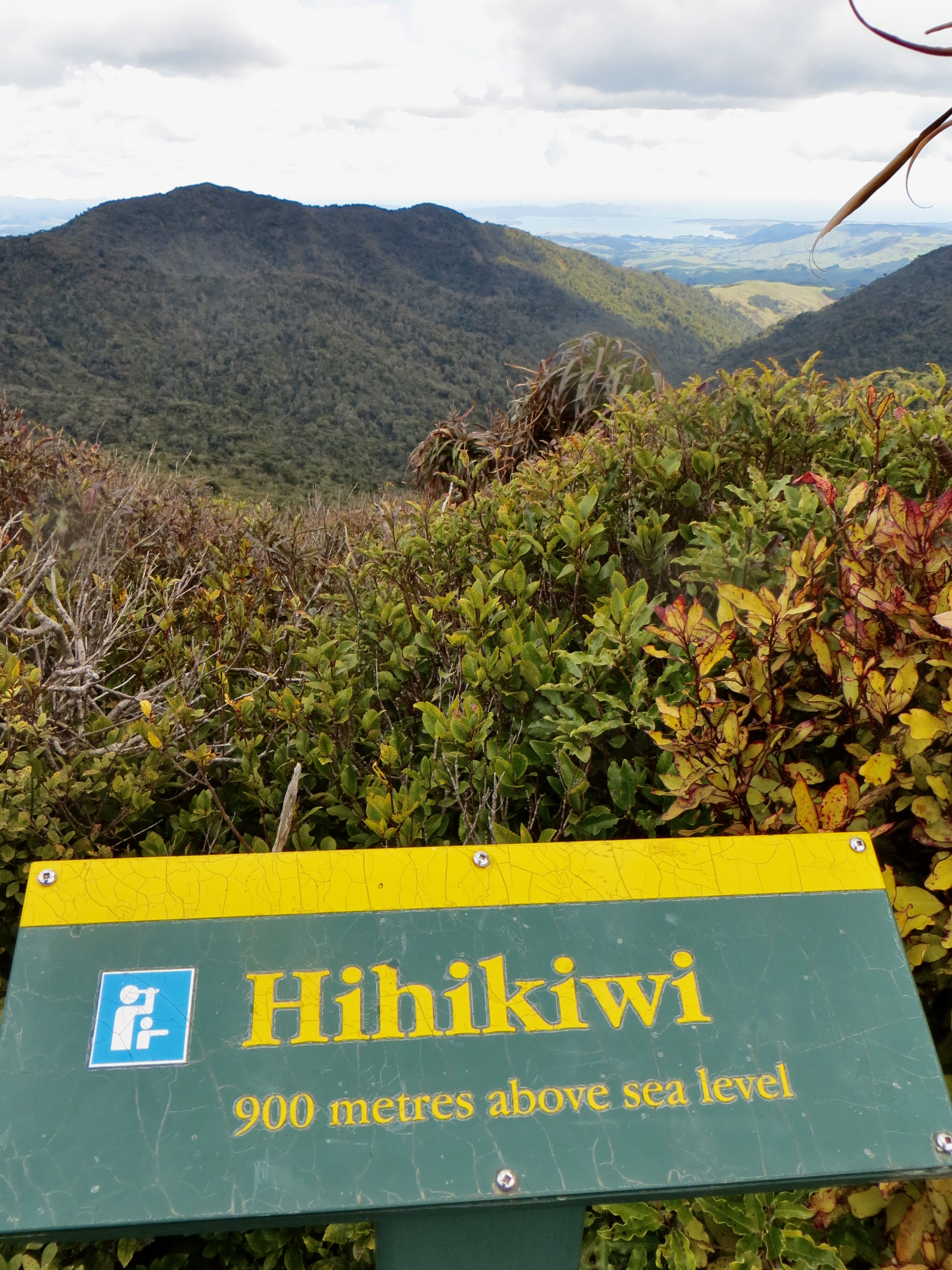
Hihikiwi summit and Ōpārau valley to Kawhia Harbour

There are numerous tracks to the summit. All the tracks are well signposted, with bright orange plastic waymarks and near the summit have recently been laid with boardwalks (see photo below), some of them as part of Te Araroa long distance trail. A lookout platform was built on Pirongia summit after 1999. From it, it is possible to spot Mount Taranaki summit and Mount Ruapehu summit on a clear day (see sunset photo). On the west side there are Aotea, Kawhia and Raglan harbours.

- Mahaukura - Tirohanga Circuit (8–11 hours 12 km (7.5 mi) return) (4–6 hr / 9 km (5.6 mi) one way) is a longer distance but with a gradual climb from Grey Road. This track is considered difficult. It leads through many steep sections but gives excellent views from Wharauroa lookout (850 m (2,790 ft)), the last 30 m (98 ft) to it having a fixed chain to assist climbing, Mahaukura peak (899 m (2,949 ft)) and Tirohanga peak. In winter and after rain the track becomes muddy and slippery. There are many narrow sections with a tangle of tree roots and rocks.
  - Wharauroa Track (2 hr / 3.5 km (2.2 mi) one way) is an alternative route to Wharauroa lookout, which is 1.1 km (0.68 mi) shorter and about 20 m (66 ft) less to climb. It starts over farmland at O’Shea Road, before climbing through tawa bush.
- Tirohanga Track (3–5 hr / 6.5 km (4.0 mi) km one way) starts at Corcoran Road, climbs to Ruapane 723 m (2,372 ft), skirts the hornblende andesite dike of Tirohanga and undulates with some chains, before merging with the Mahaukura Track.
  - Ruapane Track (1 hr 30 min 4 km (2.5 mi) one way), a longer alternative route to Ruapane, starts at Waite Road.
- Bell Track via Kaniwhaniwha Caves (6-10 hr / 18.5 km (11.5 mi) one way) starts with the Nikau Walk from Limeworks Loop Road. It stays in the valley to the kahikatea recorded as the tallest native tree at 66.5 m (218 ft), then climbs to a series of clearings, one with a campsite. Beyond it is very muddy, as it climbs to the ridge and the Cone (953 m (3,127 ft)) and then passes Pāhautea Hut to the summit.
- Tahuanui Track (4–5 hr / 10.7 km (6.6 mi) km one way) also starts with the Nikau Walk from Limeworks Loop Road. It climbs steadily beside the Kaniwhaniwha valley, before a short descent and ascent to join the Tirohanga Track to the summit.
- Hihikiwi Track (4–6 hr / 6.4 km (4.0 mi) km one way) climbs many steps in bush from Pirongia West Road, then rises further to an up and down ridge, to reach Hihikiwi Lookout (905 m (2,969 ft)), where there are views down the Ōpārau valley to Kawhia Harbour. From the lookout there is a boardwalk and steps down and up to the hut.

==== Lower tracks ====
There are also lower level tracks -

- Corcoran Road Lookout (15 min return 100 m (330 ft)) a short, wheelchair accessible track, in bush to a viewpoint.
- Mangakara Nature Walk (1 hr / 1.5 km return) views examples of miro, tawa, rimu, kahikatea, mahoe, rewarewa, kareao, pukatea, nikau and kāmahi bush.
- Nikau Walk (2 hr 30 min / 7 km return) like the Bell and Tahuanui Tracks, this walk starts at Limeworks Loop Road, passes through an area planted around 2010, then follows the Kaniwhaniwha stream to a nikau palm and tree fern fringed loop walk. A further 30 minutes of walking allows a visit to the 20 m (66 ft) long Kaniwhaniwha Cave, through the limestone.
- Ōpārau Route (1 hr one way) from Pirongia West Road is unmarked and crosses farmland to the park boundary. The Ōpārau River is unbridged and impassable after heavy rain.
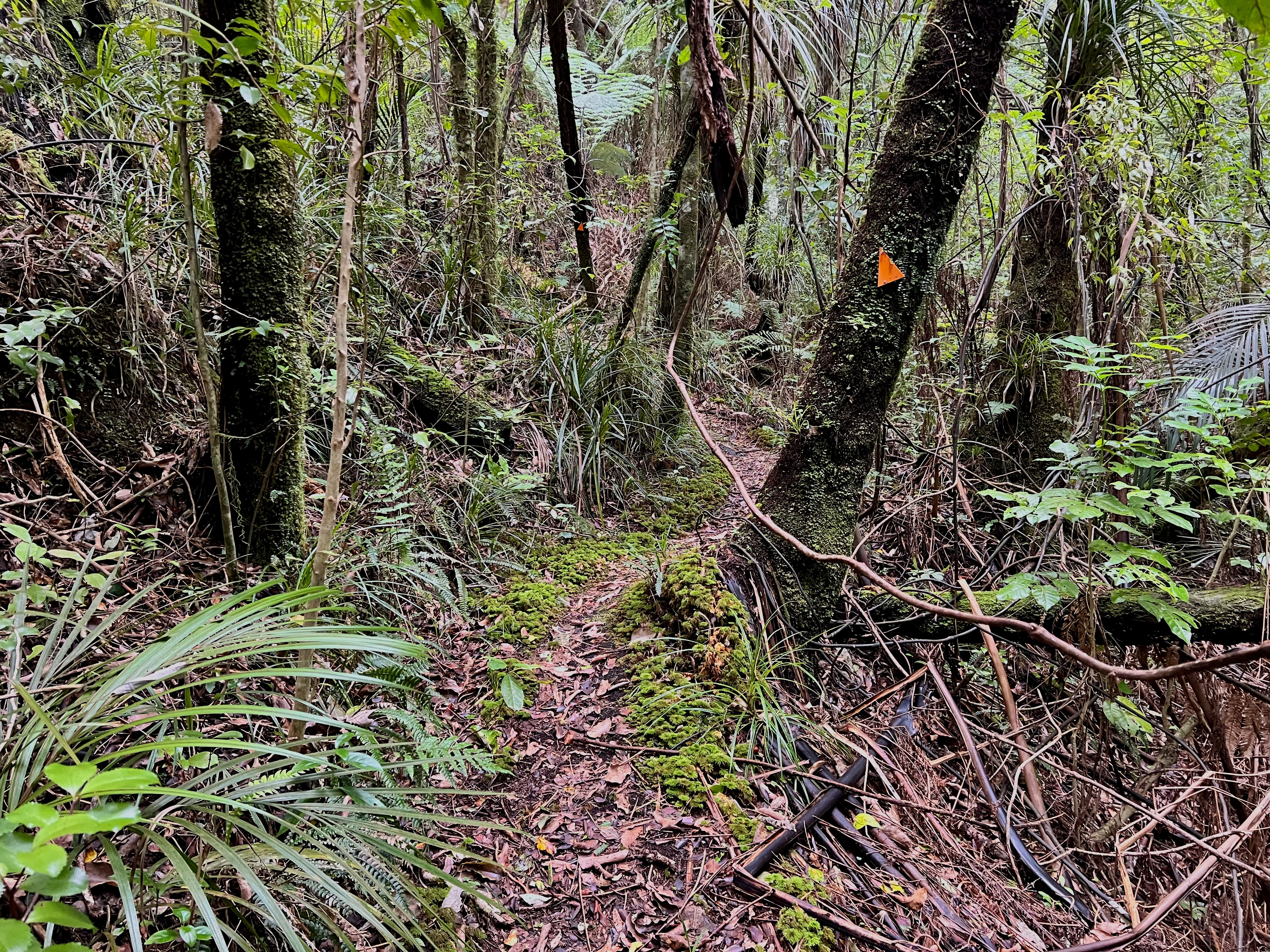
- Walter Scott Reserve loop track
  Walter Scott Reserve (1 hr 30 min loop track) was given to the Waikato Branch of Forest and Bird in 1963 and gazetted as a 40 ha (99 acres) reserve in 1966, but has since had its surrounding bush converted to farmland. The reserve has tawa-kāmahi forest with pukatea, miro and king fern.

==== Track history ====
Pirongia was surveyed in 1884, when a very sketchy map was drawn. A trip to the summit from Pirongia (probably now the Wharauroa Route) was described in 1876, was said to be, "not always well marked" in 1879, in 1922 it was reported there were no tracks and, in 1924, that part of the track had become overgrown. Ascents of Pirongia were often reported in newspapers.

View from 2015 hut looking south.

=== Hut ===
Between the Summit and The Cone, at the junction of the Bell and Hihikiwi Tracks, a hut built in 2015 has 20 bunks. An older hut with 6 bunks is next to it.

== See also ==
- List of volcanoes in New Zealand
- List of mountains of New Zealand by height
- Pirongia Forest Park brochure
