= Geology of the Waikato–King Country region =

The Waikato and King Country regions of New Zealand are built upon a basement of greywacke rocks, which form many of the hills. Much of the land to the west of the Waikato River and in the King Country to the south has been covered by limestone and sandstone, forming bluffs and a karst landscape. The volcanic cones of Karioi and Pirongia dominate the landscape near Raglan and Kawhia Harbours. To the east, the land has been covered with ignimbrite deposits from the Taupō Volcanic Zone. Large amounts of pumice from the Taupō Volcanic Zone have been deposited in the Waikato Basin and Hauraki Plains.

== Basement rocks ==
As with most of New Zealand, the basement rocks of the Waikato Region and King Country are composed of greywacke (indurated sandstone, siltstone and mudstone).

Inactive Tihiroa, Waipa and Aria fault lines in the Waikato/King Country (black proven, grey is inferred) that are also the line of a junction magnetic anomaly (click on map to enable mouse over)

The Waipa Fault passes north–south through the Waikato-King Country region, from Taupiri, along the Waipā River, and south to near Ōhura. It represents a major dividing line between different terranes.

Murihiku terrane greywacke lies beneath the Waikato–King Country region on the western side, and outcrops to the west of the Waipa Fault, from south of Waikato Heads to Awakino. The Murihiku terrane is considered to be an accretionary wedge of mainly volcanogenic forearc sediments. It was formed in Late Triassic to Late Jurassic times (220-145 Ma). Lytoceras taharoaense, a giant ammonite, was found in these rocks near Taharoa.

A line of Dun Mountain–Maitai terrane rocks are assumed to pass north–south along the Waipa Fault, through the centre of the Waikato-King Country region, separating the Murihiku terrane and Waipapa composite terrane, and produce a detectable junction magnetic anomaly, but only outcrops at one place, at Wairere. Some Murihiku rocks occur to the east of the junction magnetic anomaly, forming the Taupiri and Hakarimata Ranges, but it is assumed that these rocks have been shifted to their present position.

The Waipapa Morrinsville terrane greywacke lies beneath the Waikato–King Country region on the eastern side, south of the Hunua Ranges, and east of the Waipa Fault. It was formed in Late Jurassic to early Cretaceous times (160–120 Ma).

== Te Kuiti Group coal and limestone ==
The Te Kuiti Group rocks overlie the basement rocks, and are present in Northland, Auckland, the Waikato, and King Country, although they have often been eroded or covered. Rocks containing coal were formed from swampland in Late Eocene times (37-34 Ma). The land sunk and the sea transgressed, and calcareous sandstone, mudstone, and limestone were deposited in Oligocene times (34-24 Ma).

The coal deposits outcrop near Huntly and Maramarua, where they are mined.

Limestone exists in the area south and west of the Waikato River, down to Piopio and Te Kūiti, producing impressive bluffs around Port Waikato, Raglan Harbour, Kawhia Harbour, Otorohanga, Waitomo, Te Kūiti, etc. The Karst landscape around Waitomo contains many cave systems, including the Waitomo Glowworm Cave.

== Miocene sediment ==
In early Miocene times (24 Ma), plate convergence caused regional compression. The land eroded, and was deposited throughout the Miocene (24-5 Ma) in rapidly subsiding basins. These soft sandstones and mudstones remain to the southwest of Te Kūiti.

== Mohakatino Volcanic Arc ==
Map of selected surface volcanic features of the Waikato-King Country Region.
Legend
- Key for the volcanics that are shown with panning is:
- '"`UNIQ--templatestyles-00000003-QINU`"' basalt (shades of brown/orange)
- '"`UNIQ--templatestyles-00000004-QINU`"' monogenetic basalts
- '"`UNIQ--templatestyles-00000005-QINU`"'
  undifferentiated basalts of the Tangihua Complex in Northland Allochthon
- '"`UNIQ--templatestyles-00000006-QINU`"' arc basalts
- '"`UNIQ--templatestyles-00000007-QINU`"' arc ring basalts
- '"`UNIQ--templatestyles-00000008-QINU`"'
  dacite
- '"`UNIQ--templatestyles-00000009-QINU`"' andesite (shades of red)
- '"`UNIQ--templatestyles-0000000A-QINU`"' basaltic andesite
- '"`UNIQ--templatestyles-0000000B-QINU`"'
  rhyolite (ignimbrite is lighter shades of violet)
- '"`UNIQ--templatestyles-0000000C-QINU`"' plutonic
- White shading is selected caldera features.
- Clicking on the rectangle icon enables full window and mouse-over with volcano name/wikilink and ages before present.

The volcanic arc that developed to the west of Northland and Auckland extended further south towards Taranaki. These andesitic and basaltic volcanoes were mostly active in middle Miocene times (14-11 Ma), and contributed volcanics that are found interleaved in the sandstone and mudstone deposits that formed around that time.

== Recent volcanic activity ==
Mount Karioi and Mount Pirongia, near Raglan and Kawhia Harbours, are large stratovolcanoes composed of andesite and basalt, that erupted about 2.5 Ma ago. Other volcanoes in this group include Kakepuku, Te Kawa, and Tokanui.

Maungatautari, west of Te Awamutu, is a volcano, composed of andesite and dacite, that erupted about 1.8 Ma.

== Ignimbrite and pumice deposits ==
Over the last 2 million years, pyroclastic flows from the Taupō Volcanic Zone have deposited ignimbrites over the area east of Te Kūiti. Some of the largest deposits are from the Whakamaru eruption, north of Taupō, around 330,000 years ago. The ignimbrite deposits from the Oruanui eruption 26,500 years ago, and the Taupō eruption, 1800 years ago are also major deposits. They form impressive cliffs in many areas.

The Hauraki Plains and Hauraki Gulf represent a rift valley. The rift valley is assumed to have developed about 2 Ma ago, due to the clockwise rotation of the Eastern North Island, that stretched the land between Auckland and East Cape. This rotation may also have been associated with rifting that created the Hamilton Basin to their south west.

The Waikato River used to flow from Lake Karapiro, through the Hinuera Gap, and Hauraki Plains, to come out on the east coast in the Hauraki Gulf. The sediment from the 26.5 ka Oruanui eruption of Lake Taupō caused the river to change direction, and come out to the west. In fact, the Waikato River changes its route quite regularly, as eruptions occur in the Taupō Volcanic Zone, and the river channel becomes blocked. Many lakes and swamps in the Waikato Basin represent old routes.

Pumice from the Taupō Volcanic Zone has been deposited throughout the Waipa and Waikato Basins, and the Hauraki Plains, forming excellent soils and swampland.

== Tauranga Group ==
Tauranga Group describes sediments of the last 5 million years, mainly of volcanic pumice, initially Pliocene deposits (Walton Subgroup) from Coromandel and latterly Holocene from Taupō (Piako Subgroup). They underlie the Hamilton lowlands and extend into the Waipa basin, but elsewhere are mainly alluvial deposits in valleys. As well as pumice gravels and sands, they include silts, muds and peat.

== Coastal dunes ==
Substantial sand dunes with high iron content have formed around the Kawhia and Aotea Harbours.

David Kear's 'Geology of Ironsand Resources of New Zealand' (NZ Dept of Scientific & Industrial Research 1979) says, "The ironsand deposits extend from south Kaipara and Muriwai, north of Auckland, for over 300 miles southwards to the Whangaehu River, south of Wanganui". Soluble iron in concentrates exceeds 50% in most locations. It is currently mined at Taharoa and Waikato North Head.

== Geological sites worth visiting ==
- Hinuera Gap, State Highway 29, between Lake Karapiro and Matamata is the course of the Waikato River, before it changed to go through Hamilton. The cliffs on either side show how big the river was.
- Much of the Western hill country from Waikato Heads down to Te Kūiti contains interesting limestone countryside, with impressive bluffs. However, you need to take the small, unsealed roads to see much. The Lake Disappear polje is on one of these roads.
- The Raglan, Aotea, and Kawhia Harbours are worth a visit, especially the dissected hill country around Raglan formed on greywacke basement rocks, the limestone countryside, the sand dunes and beach near Kawhia, and Albatross Point west of Kawhia Harbour.
- Karioi and Pirongia volcanoes are well worth climbing, for those with sufficient fitness. A drive around Karioi has impressive scenery, especially the Te Toto Gorge.
- The Waitomo Area contains excellent examples of a Karst landscape, and several tourist caves, including the most famous Waitomo Glowworm Cave.
- Kiritehere (Otapirian) bed of monotis, one of the index fossils.
- Wairere has the one outcrop of serpentine in the North Island. Wairere Serpentinite was in a 650 m (2,130 ft) x 50 m (160 ft) block in a quarry near Piopio.
- Mangpehi Mine, near Benneydale is an abandoned coal mine.
- The coastal highway down to Taranaki has rugged sandstone cliffs, and black sand beaches.
- The road from Te Kūiti through to Ātiamuri has impressive Whakamaru Group welded ignimbrite cliffs.

== Maps ==
Geological maps of New Zealand are now freely accessible on line from the New Zealand Institute of Geological and Nuclear Science (GNS Science), a New Zealand Government Research Institute.

== See also ==
- Geology of New Zealand
- Geological Maps of New Zealand from Institute of Geological and Nuclear Sciences (GNS Science)
- a list of the most significant Waikato geological features
