= Waikato Basin =

Waikato Basin may refer to:

- The part of the Waikato Plains between Karapiro and Taupiri, New Zealand
- The entire catchment of the Waikato River, New Zealand
