= State Highway 31 (New Zealand) =

Road in New Zealand

State Highway 31

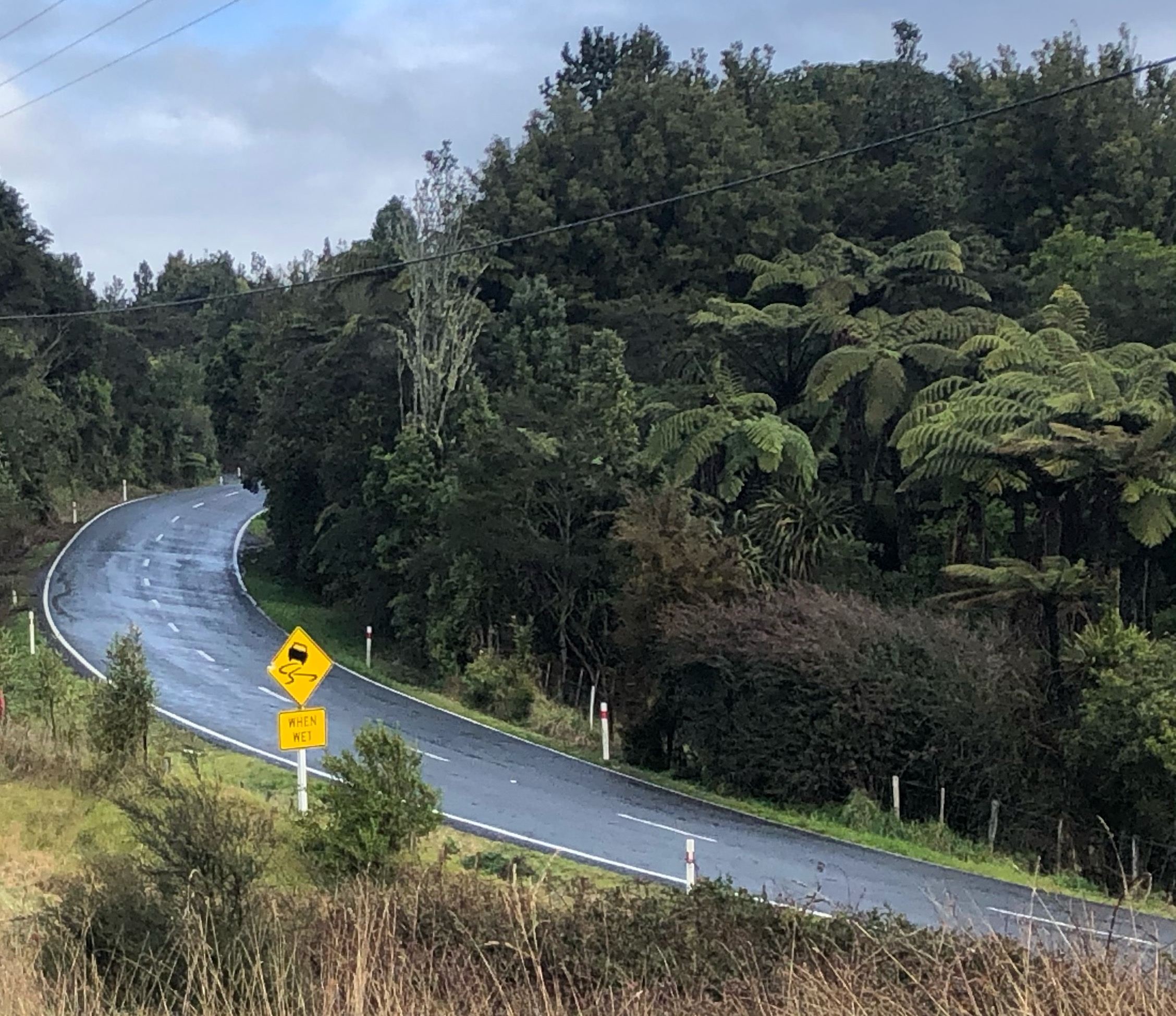

Route information
- Maintained by NZ Transport Agency Waka Kotahi
- Length: 56.4 km (35.0 mi)

Major junctions
- East end: SH 3 (Maniapoto Street) at Ōtorohanga
- SH 39 north (Ormsby Road) at Tihiroa
- West end: Pouewe Street in Kawhia

Location
- Country: New Zealand

Highway system
- New Zealand state highways; Motorways and expressways; List
← SH 30	→ SH 32

State Highway 31 (SH 31) is a New Zealand state highway in the Waikato region. It provides a link to the harbour town of Kawhia on the west coast of the North Island.

== Route description ==
SH 31 route begins at SH 3 in Ōtorohanga. The first section of this route is a joint designation with SH 39. SH 31/SH 39 initially travels northwest along Kawhia Road. After 14 km and just after the locality of Tihiroa the highway meets a junction where SH 39 carries on north and SH 31 turns sharply west, staying on Kawhia Road. The road from here on is extremely windy and treachourous, having in 2012 been assessed as the state highway with the highest personal risk. SH 31 eventually reaches Pouewe Street in Kawhia where it terminates.

It was classified as a state highway on 1 April 1948.

== Major intersections ==
The entire route is within Ōtorohanga District.

Territorial authority	Location	km	mi	Destinations	Notes
Ōtorohanga District	Ōtorohanga			SH 3 north – Hamilton; SH 3 south – New Plymouth	SH 31 begins SH 31/SH 39 concurrency begins
Ōtorohanga District	Tihiroa			SH 39 north – Pirongia, Ngāruawāhia	SH 31/SH 39 concurrency ends
Ōtorohanga District	Kawhia			Raglan Road – Raglan	
Ōtorohanga District	Kawhia			Pouewe Street	SH 31 ends
Concurrency terminus

== History ==
In 1885 the road crossing the river was only 6 ft (2 m) wide at Ōpārau. From about 1900 a coach ran for passengers between Kawhia and Te Awamutu, with a launch between Kawhia and Ōpārau. Ōpārau Ferry Bridge opened in 1913. In 1924 a 52 ft (16 m) concrete bridge was built over the Ōpārau to carry what is now SH 31. Metalling of the road was completed in 1926.

== See also ==
- List of New Zealand state highways
