= King fern =

King fern is a common name for several ferns and may refer to:

- Ptisana salicina
- Todea barbara, native to southeastern Australia, New Zealand, and South Africa
