= Hakarimata Range =

Range of hills in Waikato, New Zealand

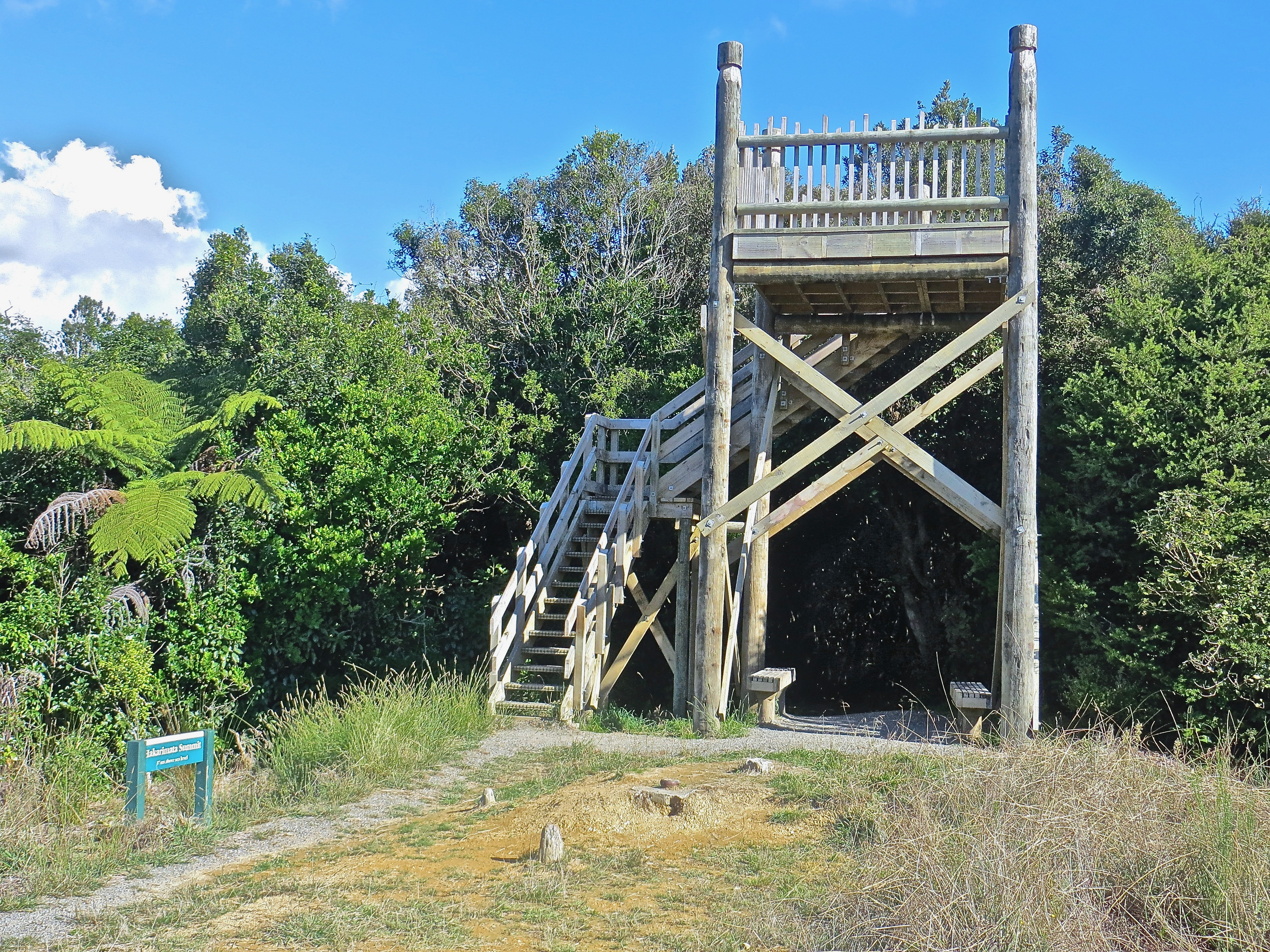
- Hakarimata summit tower

Highest point
- Elevation: 374 m (1,227 ft)
- Coordinates: 37.661945°S 175.124680°E

Geography
- Location within New Zealand
- Location: Waikato, New Zealand

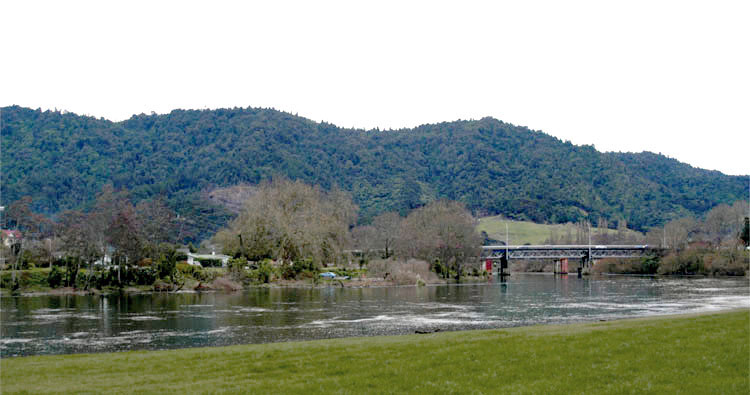
The Hakarimata range is visible in the background, with the Waikato River passing through Ngāruawāhia in the foreground.

Hakarimata Range is a range of hills on the western edge of Ngāruawāhia township, in the Waikato region of New Zealand, overlooking the confluence of the Waikato and Waipā Rivers. The Hakarimata Range is separated from the Taupiri Range by the Taupiri Gorge, through which the Waikato River flows.

After the invasion of the Waikato, parts of the Hakarimatas were confiscated in 1864. 1,850 hectares (4,600 acres) of native forest on the range are protected as a scenic reserve. A council supported community group, the Hakarimata Restoration Trust, created in 2001, is helping care for the range.

== Location ==
Although now usually applied to the hills immediately west of Ngāruawāhia, maps such as Hochstetter's of 1859, the 1925 geology map and 1944 one inch map show 'Hakarimata Range' as extending south to what is now SH23. Similarly, old accounts describe the Whatawhata-Raglan road as passing over the Hakarimatas.

== Name ==
Hakarimata's name derives from a 17th-century feast, when Ngāti Maniapoto joined the local Waikatos to celebrate the birth of a child. There was a mountain of raw forest foods; hence the name Hākari-kai-mata (uncooked food mountain), condensed to Hakarimata.

== Geology ==
Hakarimata is part of the roughly north - south Kawhia Syncline (Taupiri to the north, Kapamahunga to the south), though the Hakarimata Anticline is at about a 30° angle to the rest of the syncline, probably due to strike slip movement along the Waipa Fault, Late Triassic Newcastle Group, sandstones, siltstones and greywacke have been folded, faulted and covered by other sedimentary rocks to form the Hakarimatas.

== Flora and fauna ==
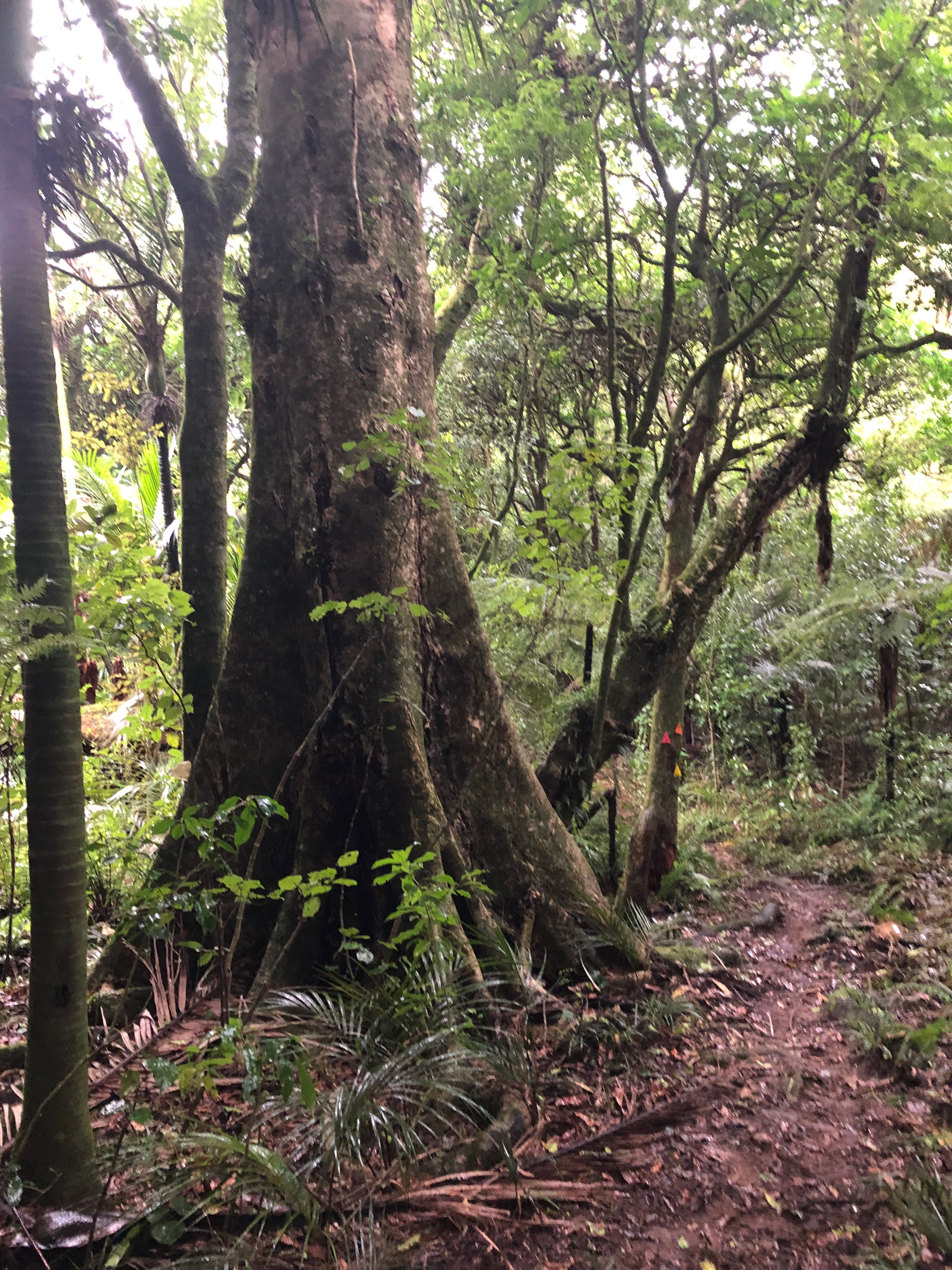
Pukatea beside the track between the summit and Rail Trail

=== Plants ===
Hakarimata is the largest remnant of broadleaf-podocarp lowland forest that once dominated the Waikato. It is near the southern limit of kauri forest and northern limit of beech forest, with plants and animals of all three forest types. Occasional large rata and rimu stand above the canopy of tawa, kohekohe, hinau, rewarewa, mangeao and pukatea. There are also some miro, Hall's totara and tanekaha. The reserve also contains several threatened plants including Alseuosmia quercifolia, or topara, which is strongly scented in spring.

=== Animals ===
Tūī, kererū, pīwakawaka, pīpīwharauroa, kārearea, pekapeka, copper skink, Auckland green gecko and peripatus are among the species in the bush. 16 species of native fish include short and longfinned eels and banded, short-jaw and giant, kōkopu. In 1995/96, to connect the Hakarimata tree canopy with the Waikato River, and thus encourage indigenous fish, three Waikato tributaries had 12 km (7.5 mi) of fences, 12 stock-water troughs, 5 bridges, and over 10,000 trees and shrubs added. By 2003, fish had increased from 63 to 80 fish per 150 m (490 ft) of stream and a new species, lamprey, was found.

== Pests ==
Since the land was reserved (from 1905 onwards), the fringe areas and lower slopes have slowly regenerated after suffering light logging, fires, pigs, goats, possums, cats, hedgehogs, rats, mice, stoats, weasels and ferrets, with occasional deer and wallaby. Goats, possum and rats are controlled, with possum self-resetting traps trialled in 2011. About 200 ha (490 acres) of privately owned forest adjoin the reserve, some of which is protected by covenant. Kauri dieback disease is not present, so a boot cleaning station was put at the Huntly end in 2015.

Fire is also a threat. In 2017 an area of 600 by 300m on a ridge beside the quarry was burnt.

== Quarry ==
The large quarry at 181 Waingaro Road, Ngāruawāhia, opened in a quarry reserve in 1948 and now goes well below sea-level. It was bought by Brian Perry Ltd in the 1980s and sold to Fulton Hogan in 2016. An extension which would have doubled the size of the quarry wasn't permitted in 2008. It would have taken native trees estimated to be 800 years old. The quarry then employed 13 and supplied about 35% of the area's needs. Environment Waikato granted Perry Aggregates resource consents in 2009, following which bait stations were put in the area in 2011 and the quarry was given Mimico Environmental Awards for that and, in 2018, for extending native fish passage.

== Tracks ==
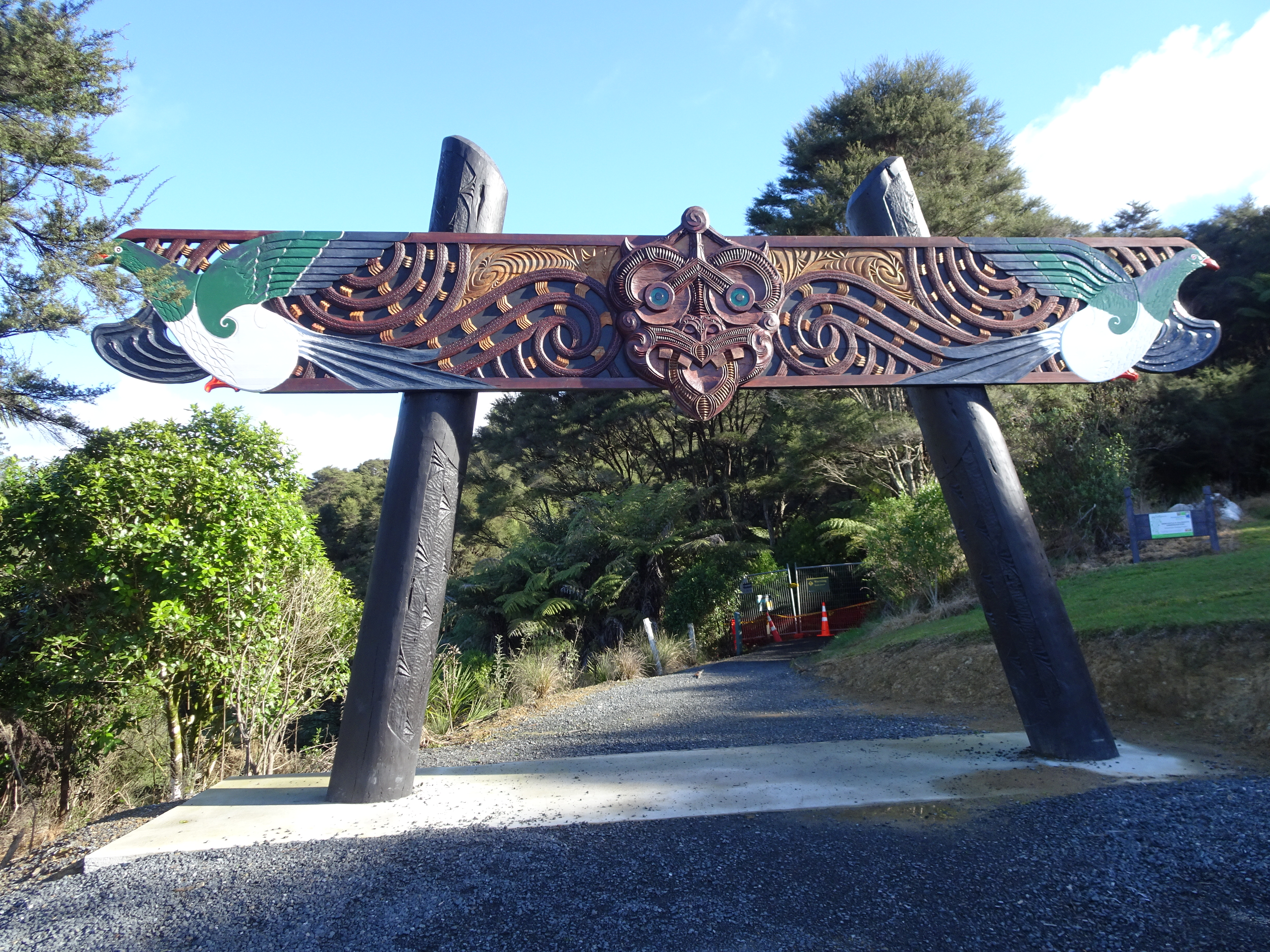
Tomokanga at entrance to Waterworks Walk and Summit Track

The range has been used for recreational rambling since at least 1892.

There are two main walkways through the range, allowing excellent views of the Waikato Plains below. The main one is Hakarimata Walkway (12 km, 7 hr 30 min) along the ridge from Parker Road at the northern end to the Hakarimata Rail Trail (off Waingaro Rd) at the south.

Te Araroa follows that walkway to the summit, where a viewing tower offers vistas towards the coast, across the Waikato Basin and to Ruapehu on a clear day. Te Aroroa drops from the summit by the other main walkway, Hakarimata Summit Track (2 km, 3 hr return, 335 metres on 1349 steps), to Brownlee Avenue in Ngāruawāhia. The steps had 140,000 visits in 2016, compared to 5000 in 2011, shortly after they opened. The remainder of the track south to Hakarimata Rail Trail (3.5 km, 2 hr) can be linked by a 1.8 km walk along Waingaro Road back to Brownlee Ave.

There are several shorter walks using parts of the Hakarimata Walkway and/or the Summit Track:-

- At the northern end, Kauri Loop Track (3 km, 2 hr return for full loop; 40 min to kauri grove) from Parker Road car park starts with a long flight of steps to one of the largest kauris in Waikato, 7 m (23 ft) girth and 36.7 m (120 ft) high, estimated to be over a thousand years old. The Southern Lookout has views of Huntly and the north Waikato lakes, Hamilton and Tongariro on a clear day.
- In the middle, Waterworks Walk (1 km, 1 hr return) from Brownlee Avenue runs beside Mangarata Stream to the 1922 reservoir, once Ngāruawāhia's water supply. In November 2016 a Tomokanga (archway) was added near the beginning of the walk.
- At the southern end, Hakarimata Rail Trail (1.5 km, 30 min) follows the former Glen Massey railway. A short extension leads to the Cascades.

== Gallery ==
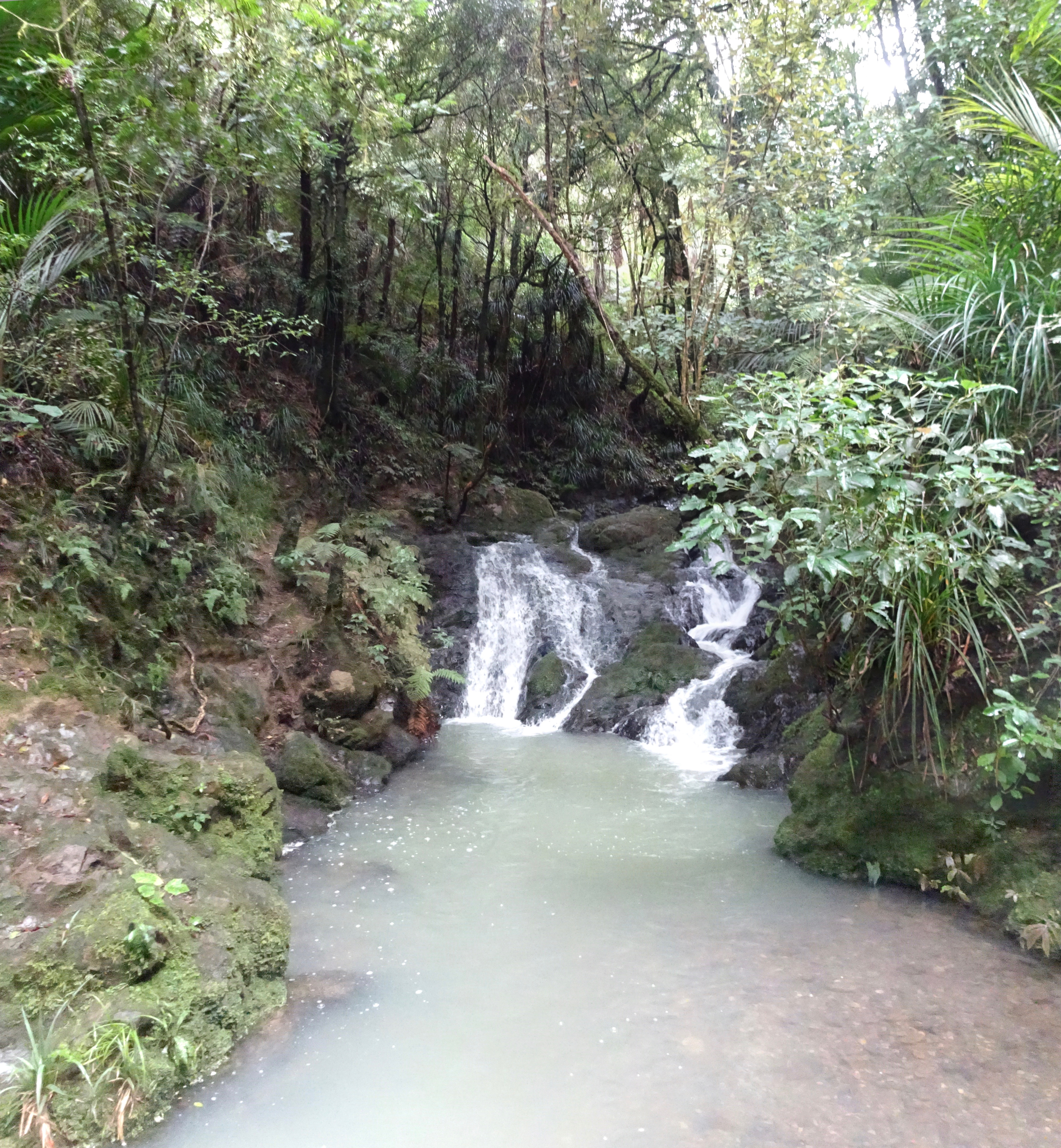
Cascades at the foot of the ascent to the summit from the south

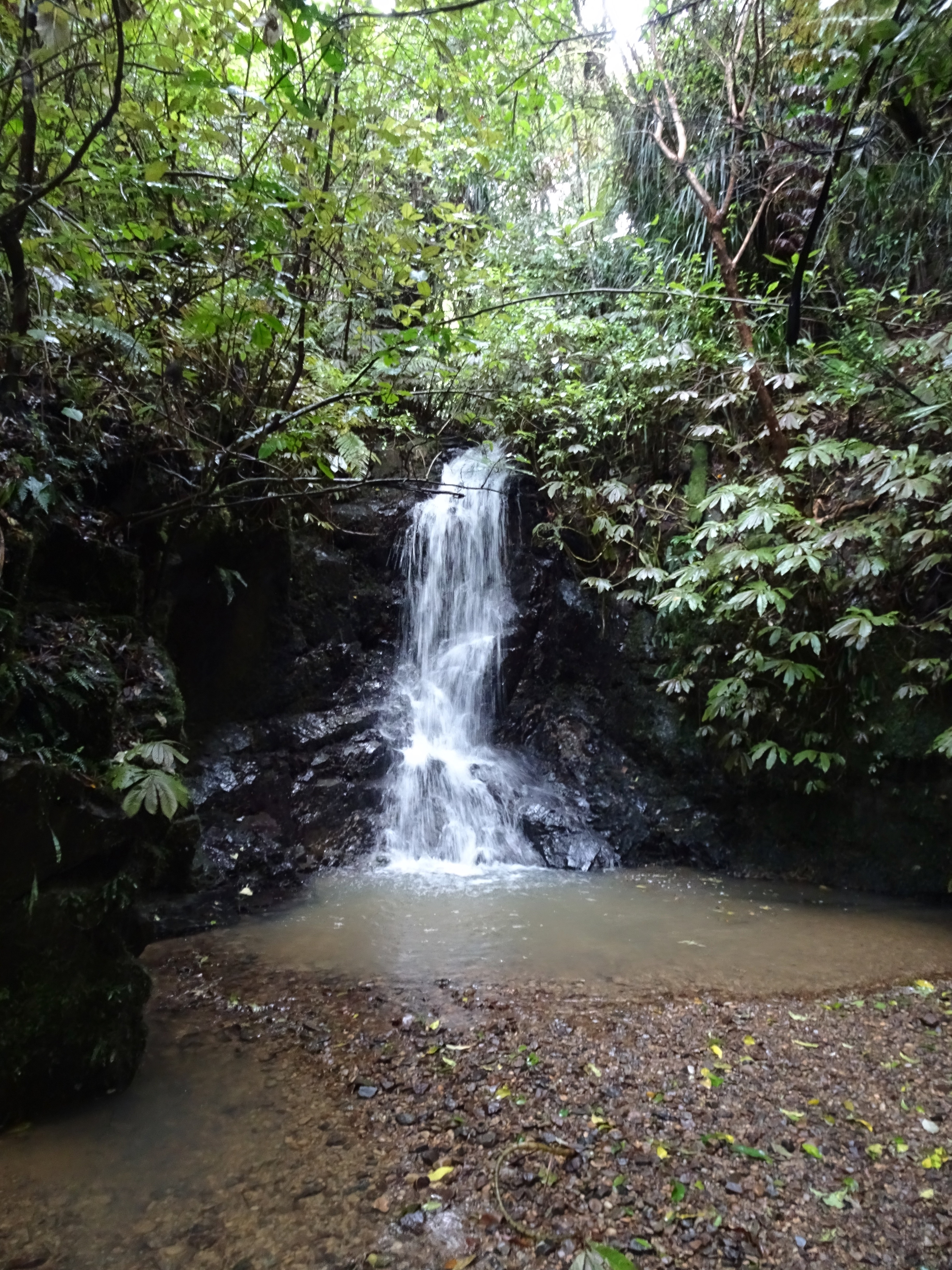
Mangarata Stream waterfall, just above the reservoir

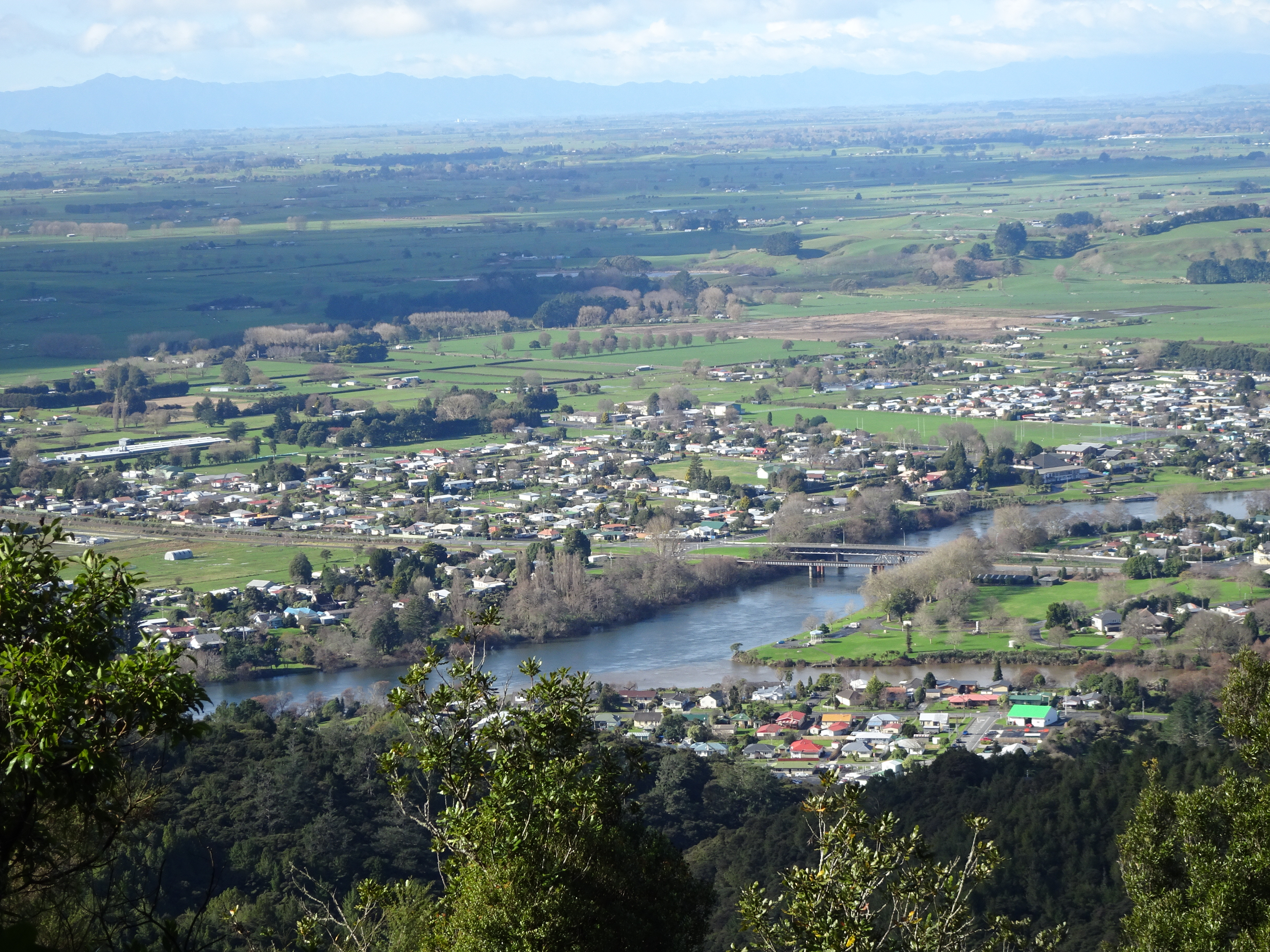
Ngāruawāhia, Waikato basin and Kaimais from Hakarimata Summit

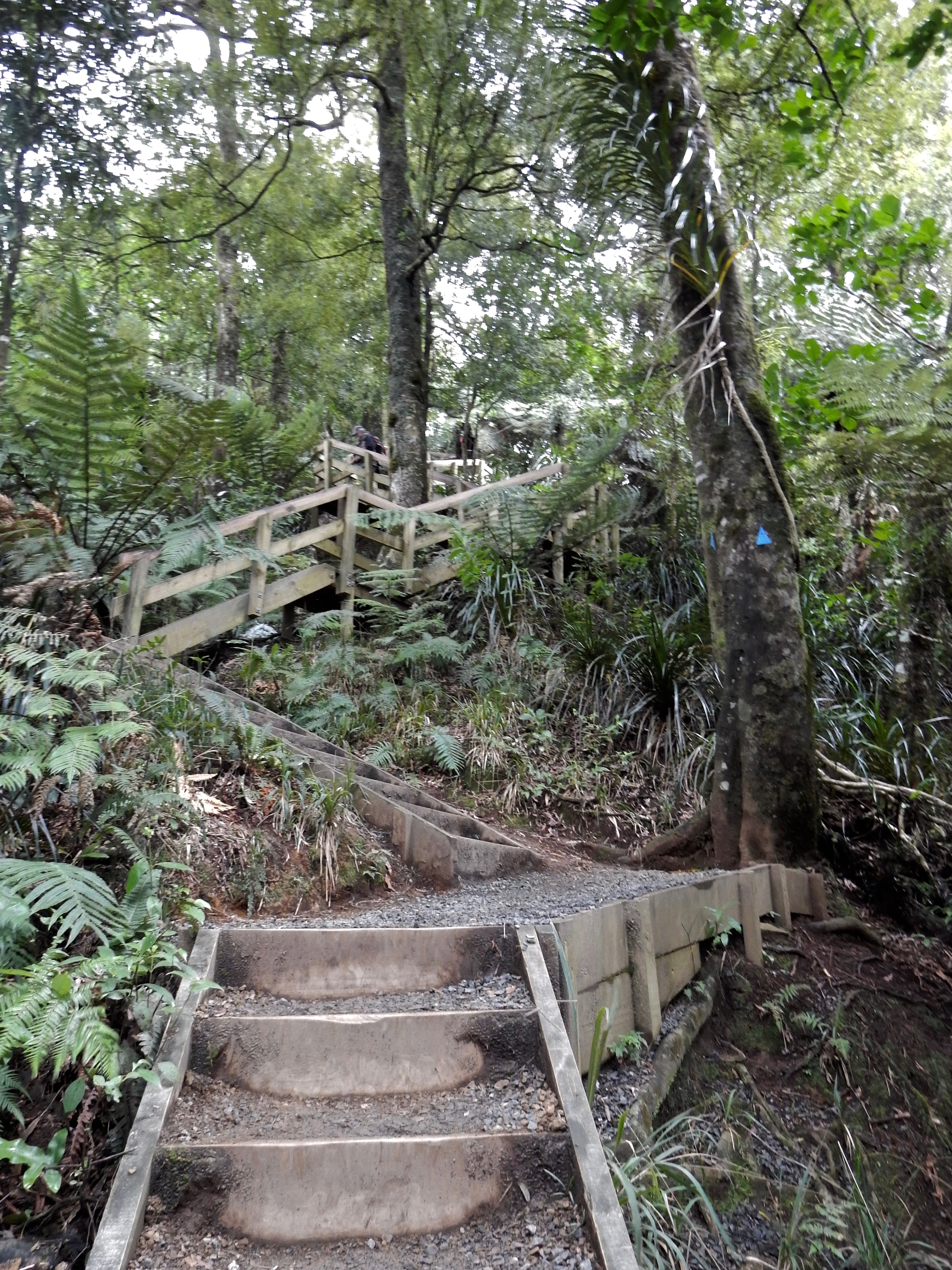
Some of the 1349 steps on the Summit Track

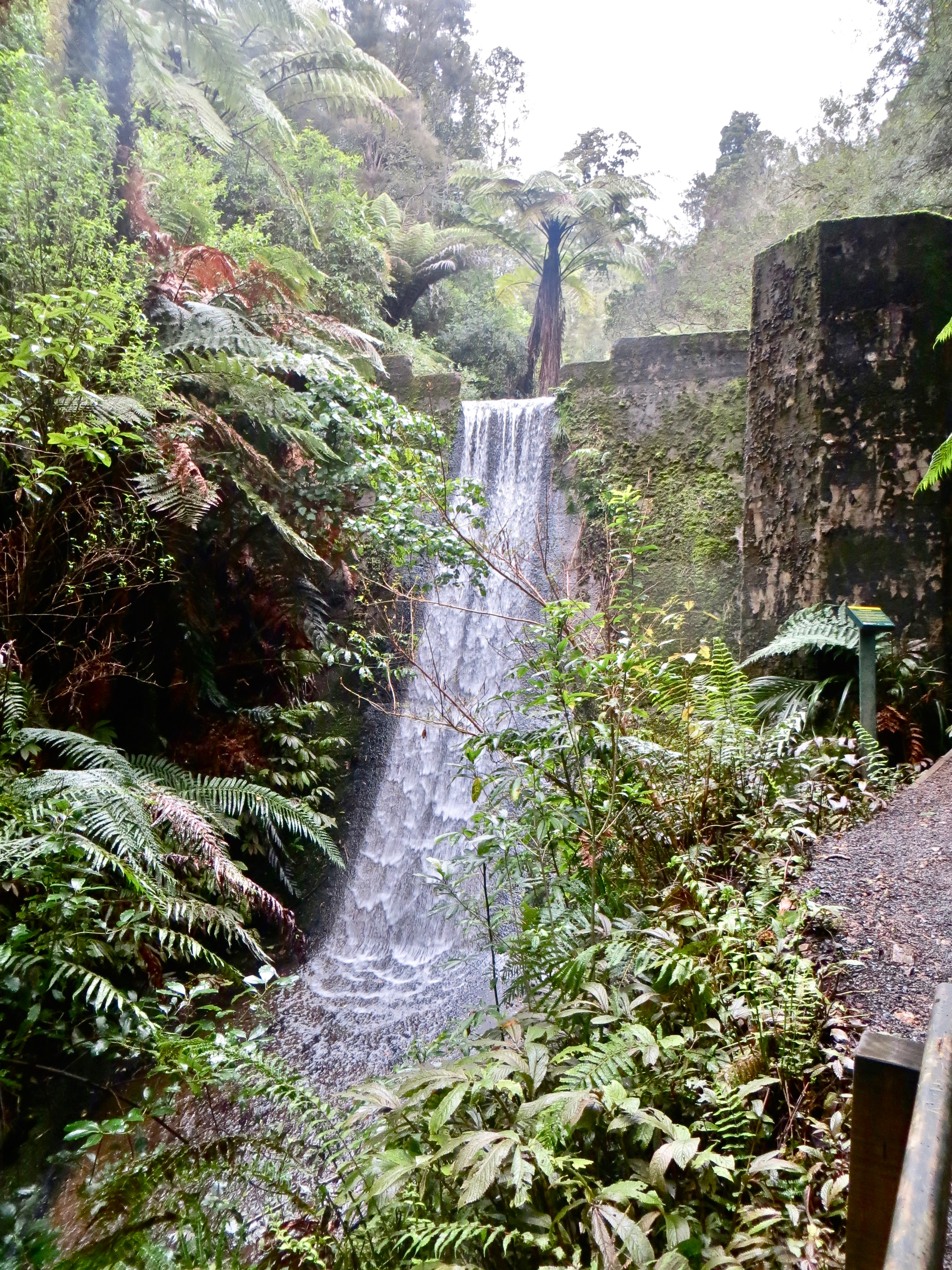
Mangarata Dam spillway. Parataniwha is common in the valleys.

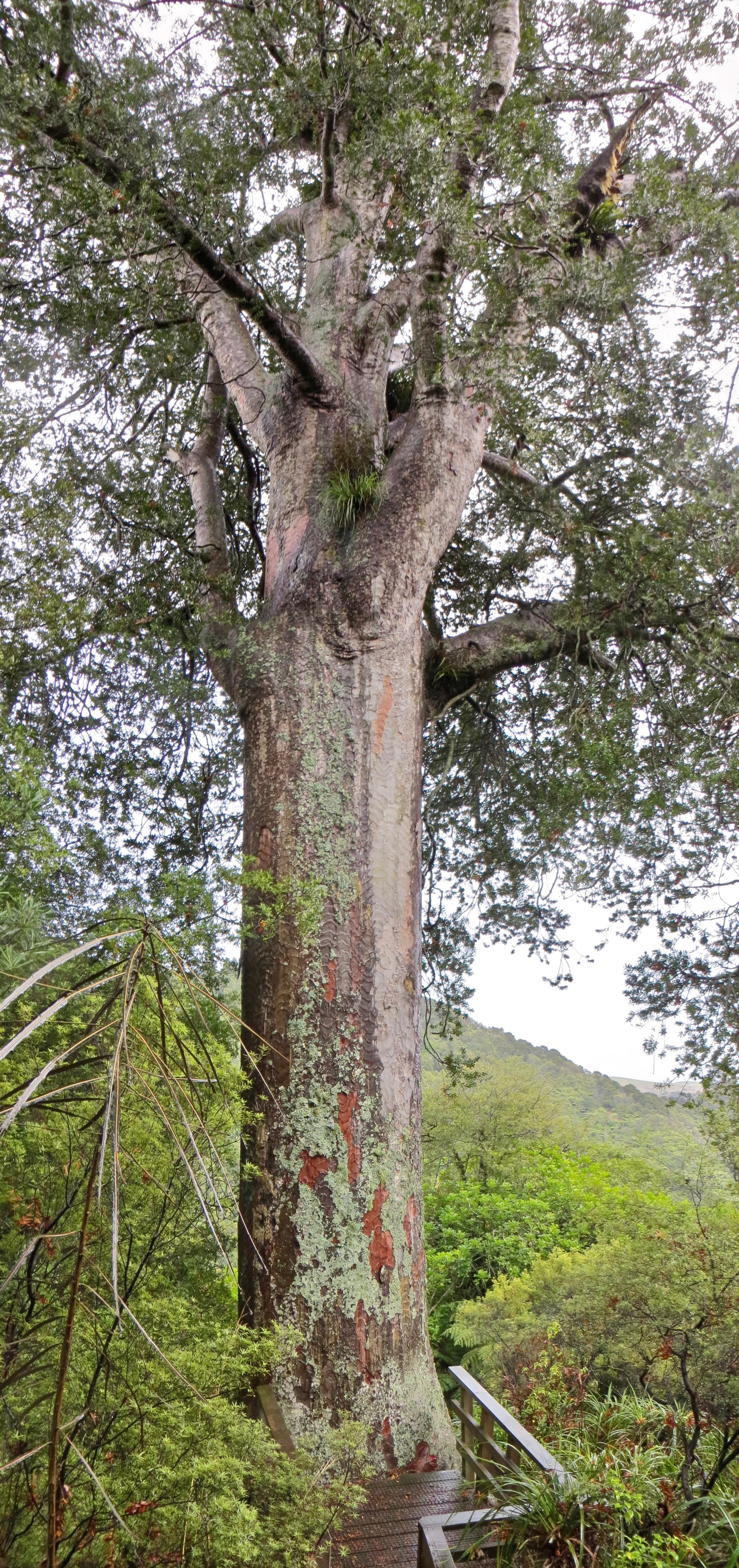
The platform is to protect the big tree from kauri dieback

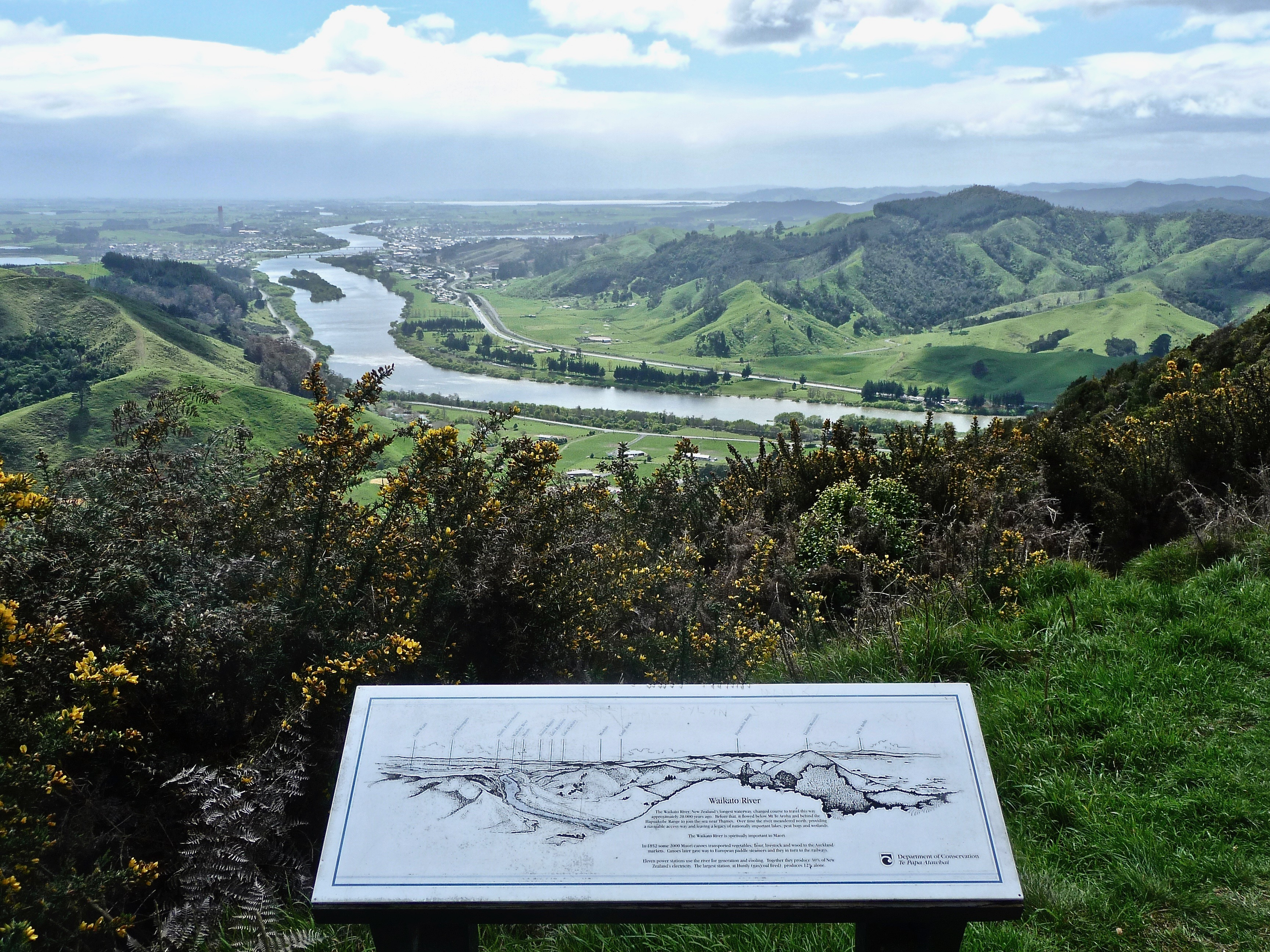
Huntly and Waikato River from Northern Lookout
