= Ōpārau River =

Coordinates: 38°03′S 174°55′E

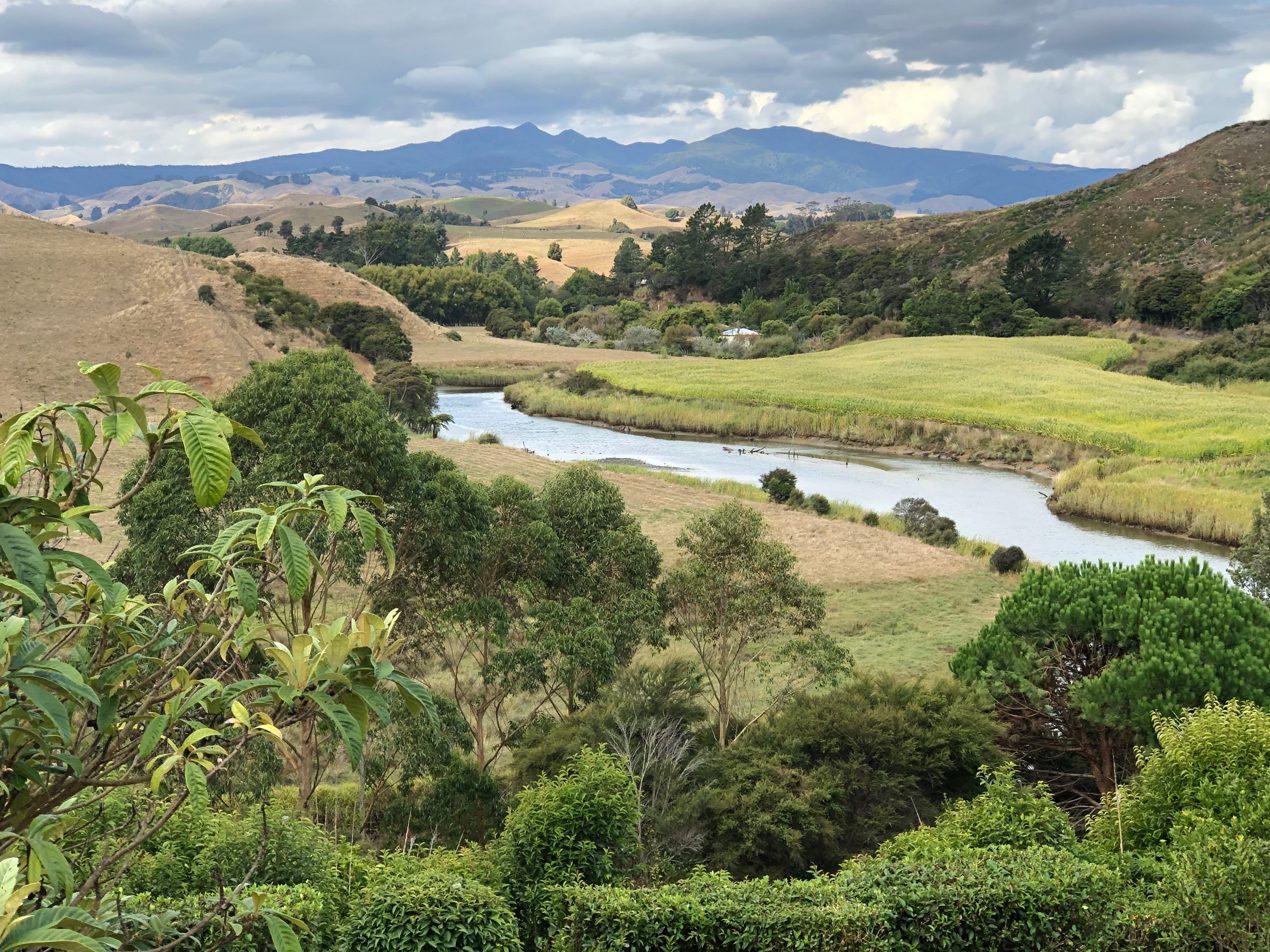
- Ōpārau River at Ōpārau and Pirongia in 2019

Location
- Country: New Zealand

Physical characteristics
- Source
  - elevation: 953 m (3,127 ft)
- Mouth
  - location: Kawhia Harbour
  - elevation: 0m
- Length: 24.5 km (15.2 mi)
- Basin size: 120 km^{2} (46 sq mi)

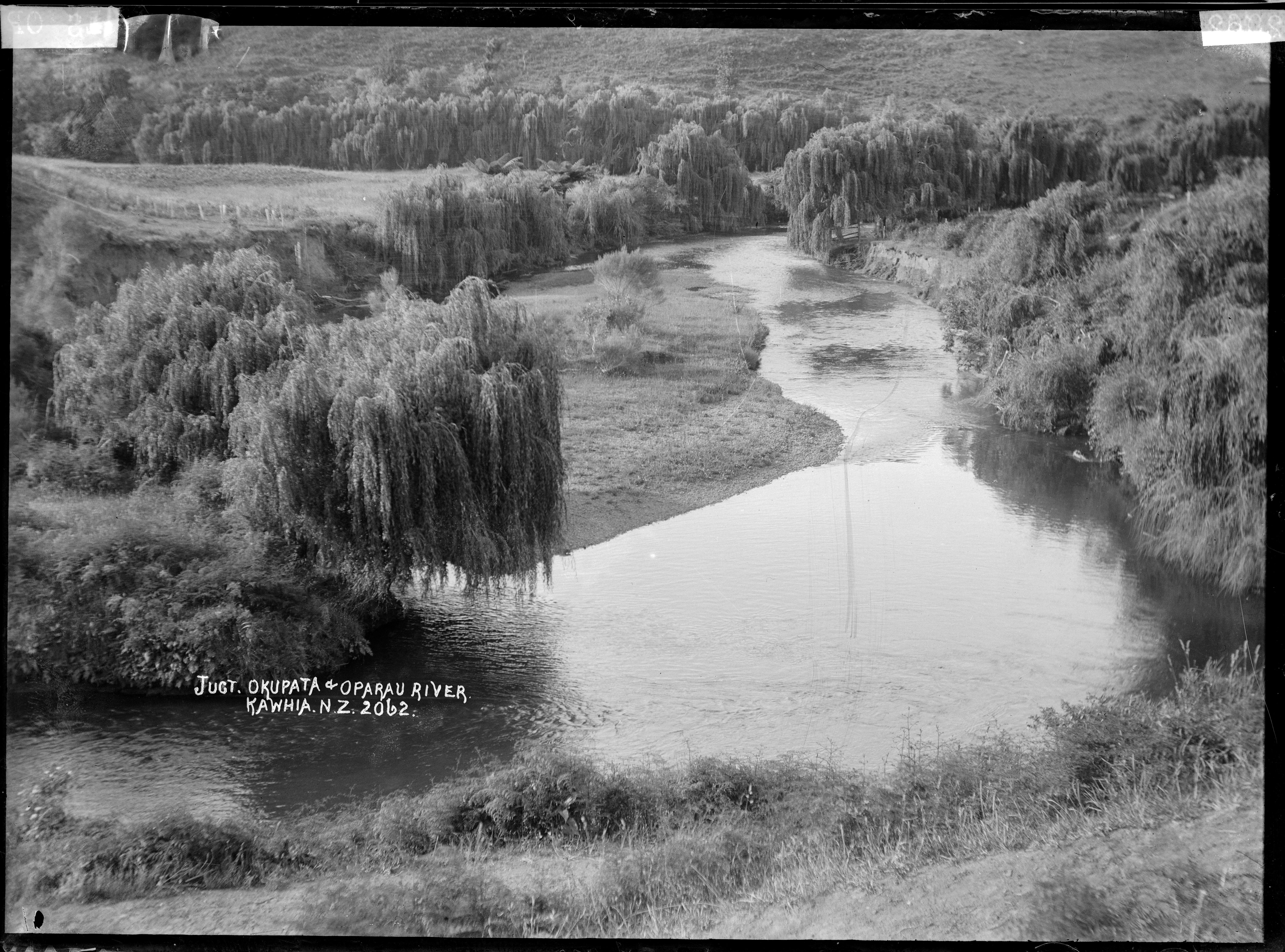
Junction of Ōkupata Stream and Ōpārau River at Ōpārau

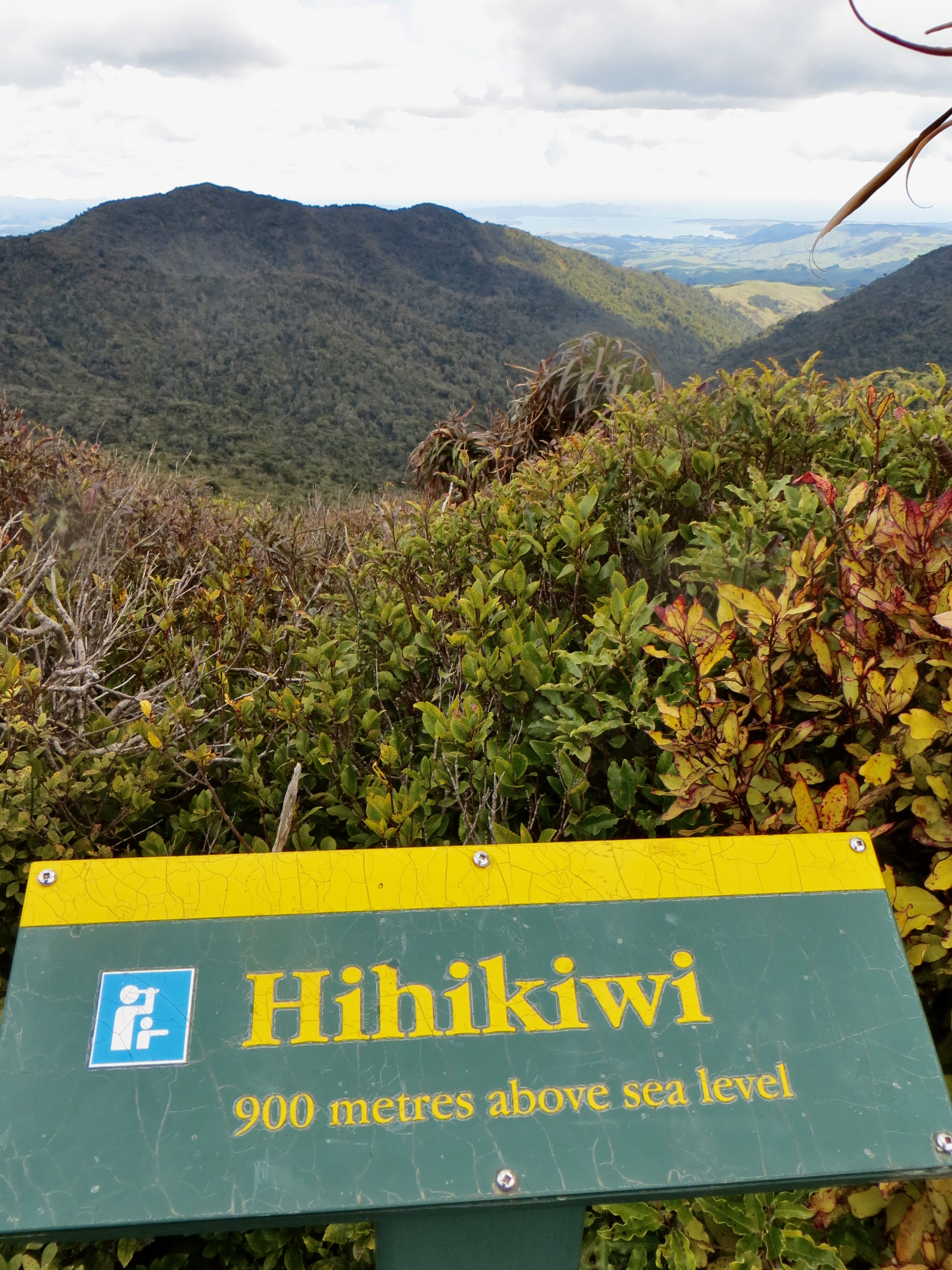
Ōpārau valley and Kawhia Harbour from Hihikiwi summit in 2015

The Ōpārau River is a river of the Waikato Region of New Zealand's North Island in the area occupied by Ngāti Hikairo. It flows southwest from its sources in the Pirongia Forest Park, the highest being The Cone, and flows into the Kawhia Harbour, 5 kilometres (3 mi) east of Kawhia. The river has about 171 km (106 mi) of tributaries.

== Name ==
The New Zealand Ministry for Culture and Heritage gives translations of "place of many fortified villages" or "place of falsehood" for Ōpārau. The official name was confirmed by Gazette as Ōpārau River on 21 June 2019.

== Pollution ==
The river is naturally turbid and had low to moderate levels of phosphorus and nitrogen, though it is among the poorer rivers for ammoniacal nitrogen, black disc and e coli measurements.

== Nature ==
Tiritiri Matangi peninsula, in the river's estuary, is a protected area of international ecological significance, as it is an important stop for migratory seabirds. Redfin bully and kōaro are common fish in the river. Fragrant fern and Pānakenake grow in the valley.

== Walks ==
Walking tracks around the upper catchment of the river are the Ōpārau Route, Bells Track and Hihikiwi Track (part of Te Araroa long distance trail).

== Roads and bridges ==
In 1885 the road crossing the river was only 6 ft (2 m) wide at Ōpārau. From about 1900 a coach ran for passengers between Kawhia and Te Awamutu, with a launch between Kawhia and Ōpārau. Ōpārau Ferry Bridge opened in 1913. In 1924 a 52 ft (16 m) concrete bridge was built over the Ōpārau to carry what is now SH31. Metalling of the road was completed in 1926.

In 1938 the Hamilton mayor, John Fow, and Chamber of Commerce were reviewing plans for a new link to Kawhia. A route through the valley, via Kaniwhaniwha and Karamu was suggested and, by 1945, there was much backing for a 10 mi (16 km) long road on that route, which would have reduced the distance between Hamilton and Kawhia by about 20 mi (32 km).

== Hydroelectric ==
From 1923 Ōpārau was served by hydroelectric power, generated for the dairy by a 33 hp (25 kW) turbine at Mangapapa Falls, about 2 km (1 mi) upstream from the village. A 1922 Order in Council allowed up to 10 cu ft (283 L) per second of water to be taken. The dairy opened in 1904.

== School ==
Ōpārau village had a school from 1902 until it closed in 2006.

== See also ==
- List of rivers of New Zealand
