= Waikato Plains =

Coordinates: 37°40′11.79″S 175°31′5.93″E

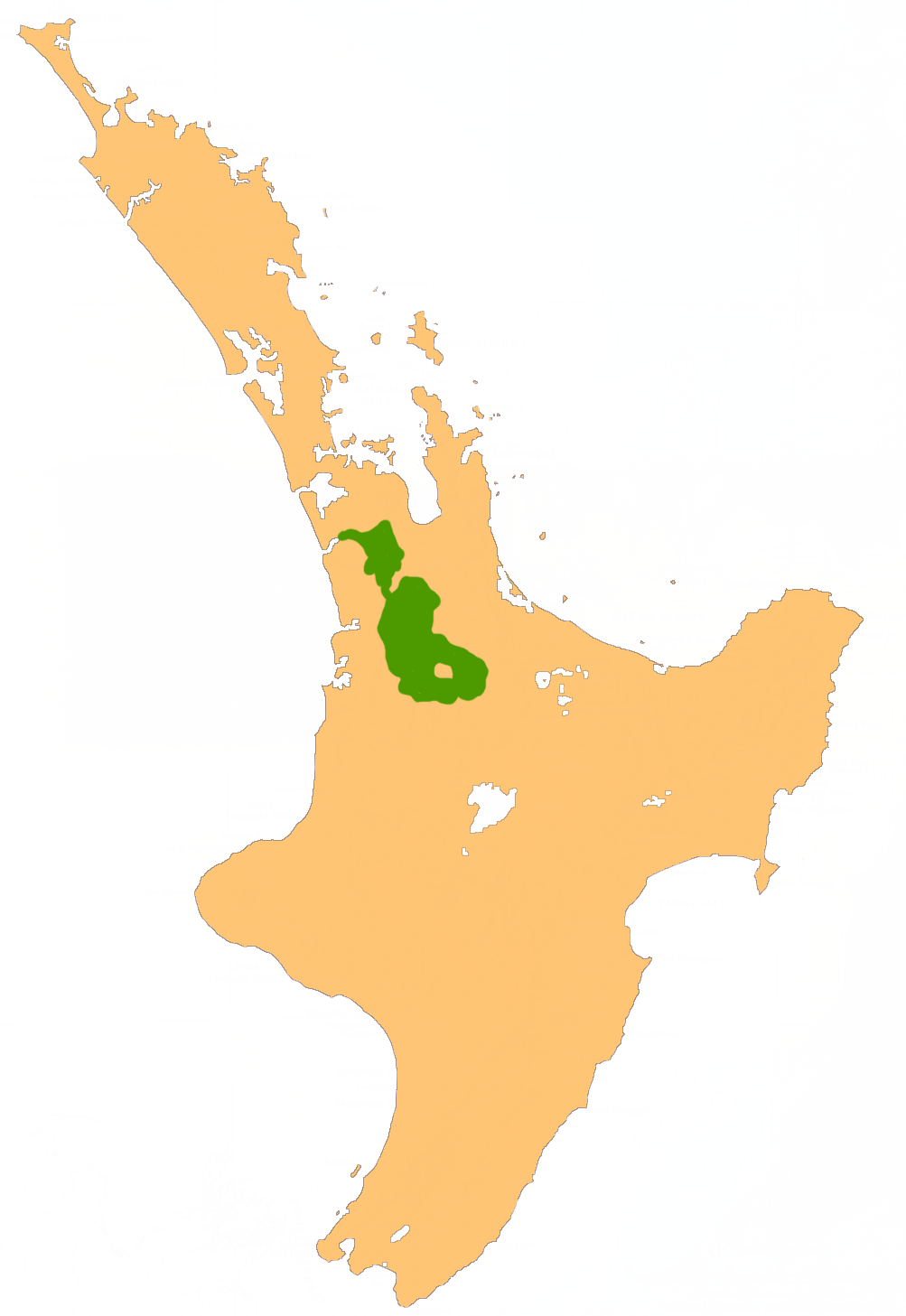
Location of the Waikato Plains

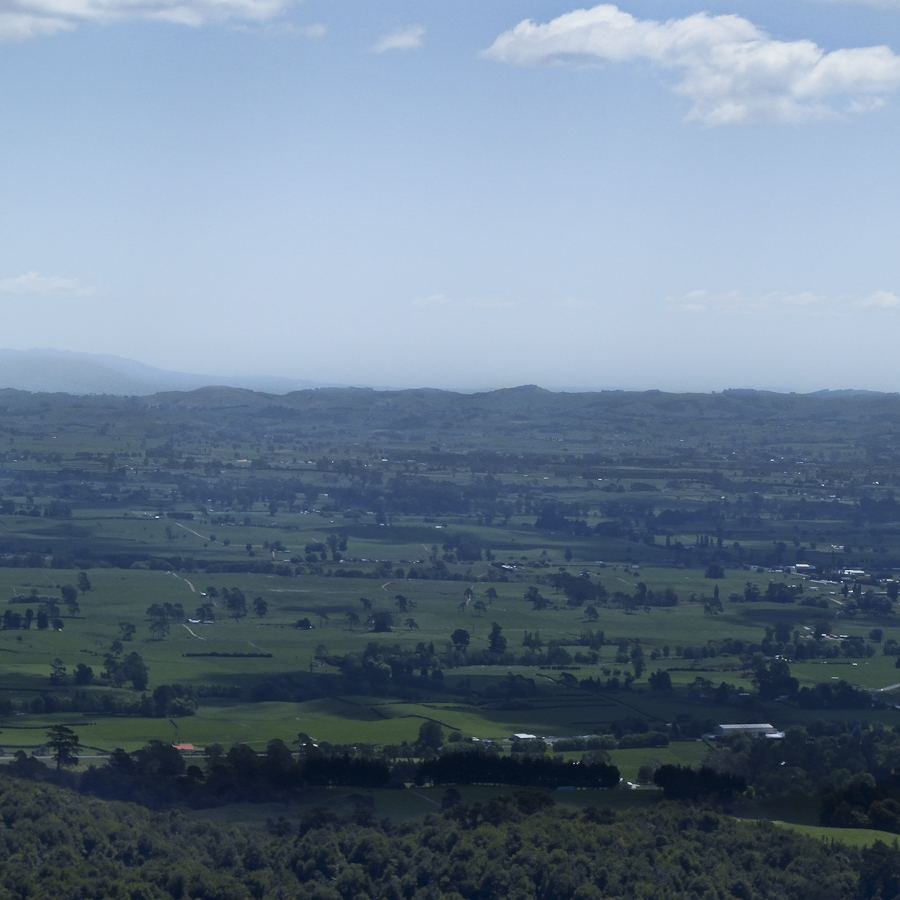
Waikato Plains from northeast towards Pirongia.

The Waikato Plains (the alternative name Waikato Basin is an ambiguous term as it can refer to the entire river catchment) form a large area of low-lying land in the northwest of the North Island of New Zealand. They are the alluvial plains of the Waikato River, the country's longest river with a length of 425 km (264 mi).

== Geography ==
The plains can be divided roughly into the Middle Waikato Plain (also Middle Waikato Basin Hamilton Basin ), extending in all directions around the city of Hamilton, and the Lower Waikato Plain, nearer the river's mouth. The two are broken by the rough, low-lying hills of the Hakarimata Range, between Ngāruawāhia and Huntly, and the Taupiri Range.

The region is heavily populated by New Zealand standards, with many living in Hamilton which is located towards the centre of the plains.

The plains are an area of once swampy land, much of which was drained by the early settlers, such as the Morrin brothers in the late 18th century. They are now intensively farmed with dairy cattle, sheep, grain and maize, with dairy farming being the staple of the local economy. The lower plain is also known for vineyards, and the middle plain has some of the southern hemisphere's top thoroughbred stables, notably around the towns of Cambridge and Matamata.

A considerable amount of the land is peaty, and significant sections, particularly in the north east are still undrained swamp. Dozens of shallow riverine lakes lie at the central and southern end of the lower plain, notably Lake Waikare.

This part of the Wailkato watershed is currently managed as the Middle Waikato Management Zone and the Lower Waikato Management Zone.

=== Geology ===
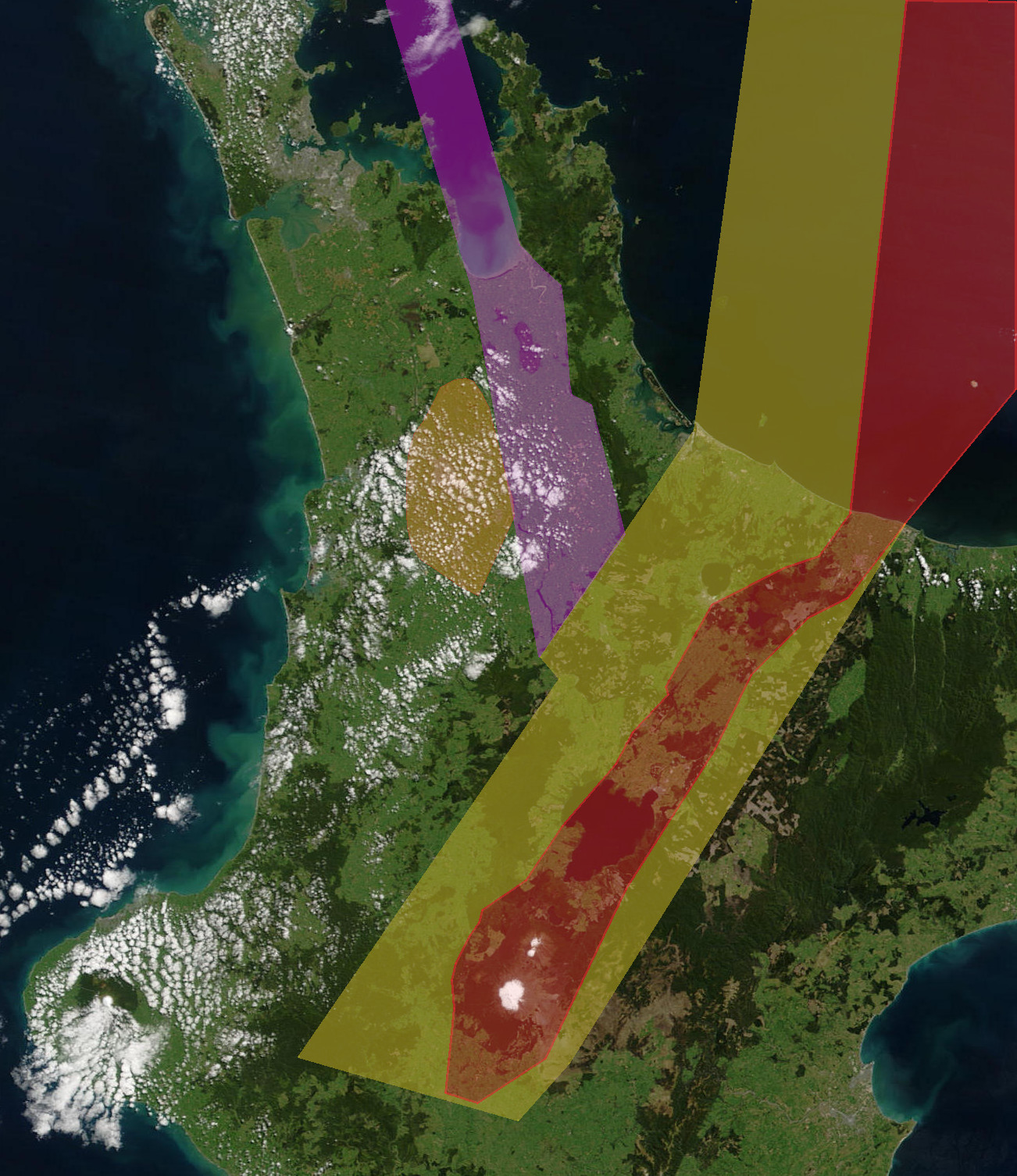
Orange shading shows the approximate area of the inactive Hamilton Basin intra-continental rift related to currently active intra-continental rifts North Island, New Zealand. These being the Hauraki Rift (purple), the modern Taupō Rift (red). The inactive old Taupō Rift (yellow) is also shown.

There is geological evidence that the Hamilton Basin portion was formed as a rift valley. The normal faulting associated with this may have become inactive before 350,000 years ago, although in lake sediments there is evidence of significant local earthquake activity as recently as 7600 years ago, but epicenters may relate to known current active fault systems to the north east of the plains.

The basement is Waipapa Morrinsville Terrane formed of greywacke in the Late Jurassic to Early Cretaceous (160-120 Ma).

The Hamilton Basin originally formed under water so marine Pliocene beds underlie Quaternary deposits that date from about 1.8 million years ago. The oldest deposits are called the Puketoka Formation which contains clays, sands, breccias and ignimbrite sheets from pyroclastic flow reaching the basin. The younger Waerenga Gravels are composed of weathered greywacke debris presumably deposited in fans extending from the surrounding ranges. Even younger, and so closer to the surface usually, is the Karapiro Formation with rhyolitic sands and gravels which can be weathered to clay.

The Waikato River has changed course many times in the basin, as recently as in the last 1800 years. More spectacular course changes occurred on at least four occasions in the last 100,000 years, with it flowing northeast from the region of the current Lake Karapiro, and exiting near Thames in the Hauraki Gulf leaving drainage of the basin to the Waipa River which has not always been a tributary to the Waikato River. Between 65,000 years to at most 25,000 years ago the Waikato River drained the Waikato Plains but it then drained through the Hauraki Plains for 6,000 years returning to drain the Waikato Plains from around 19,000 years ago. So only in recent times, again, has it flowed northwest to empty into the Tasman Sea near Port Waikato. This means the recent sedimentary deposits near the river are mainly altered volcanic eruptives washed down from the North Island Volcanic Plateau and broken down volcanic soils but there are also layers of tephra/breccia from the many significant rhyolitic eruptions to the south where recent river flooding has not been disruptive. Layers of the fifteen layer Kauroa Ash Formation are found within both the Puketoka and Karapiro Formation depending upon where you are in the basin. The ash beds can be many meters thick, although thin out north of Hamilton, and include the eight layer 3 to 5 m (9.8 to 16.4 ft) thick Hamilton Ash Formation deposited between 350,000 and 100,000 years ago. There are also tephras derived from the andesitic stratovolcanoes of the Tongariro and Taranaki regions, as well as from Mayor Island/Tuhua. The airfall tephra layers of the last 50,000 years vary from between 0.5 to 1.5 m (1 ft 8 in to 4 ft 11 in) thick.
