= North Island surface volcanism =

Volcanic deposits of North Island, New Zealand

North Island surface volcanic deposits
- Stratigraphic range: Miocene, ~25–0 Ma
- Type: Igneous
- Overlies: Murihiku Terrane, Caples Terrane and Waipapa Composite Terrane Greywacke, some Haast Schist near Rotoroa

Lithology
- Primary: Basalt, andesite and rhyolite

Location
- Coordinates: 37°S 175°E
- Region: North Island
- Country: New Zealand
- Map of selected surface volcanic features in the northern North Island which includes features from volcanic activity in recorded historic times in New Zealand. Legend: Key for the volcanics that are shown with panning is: basalt (shades of brown/orange); monogenetic basalts; undifferentiated basalts of the Tangihua Complex in Northland Allochthon; arc basalts; arc ring basalts; dacite; andesite (shades of red); basaltic andesite; rhyolite (ignimbrite is lighter shades of violet); plutonic; White shading is selected caldera features.; Clicking on the rectangle icon enables full window and mouse-over with volcano name/wikilink and ages before present.

Much of the volcanic activity in the northern portions of the North Island of New Zealand is recent in geological terms and has taken place over the last 30 million years. This is primarily due to the North Island's position on the boundary between the Indo-Australian and Pacific plates, a part of the Pacific Ring of Fire, and particularly the subduction of the Pacific plate under the Indo-Australian plate. The activity has included some of the world's largest eruptions in geologically recent times and has resulted in much of the surface formations of the North Island being volcanic as shown in the map.

== Current activity ==
The active or dormant volcanoes extend from Northland through the "City of Volcanoes", Auckland to Taranaki on the west coast and Bay of Plenty on the East with the North Island Volcanic Plateau hosting multiple active volcanoes. There has been activity within the last 5000 years in all these areas, with most activity on North Island Volcanic Plateau where the Taupō Rift is widening by as much as 19 mm (0.75 in)/year, much faster than other continental intraarc rifts. The Taupō volcanoes most recent major eruption, the Taupō or Hatepe eruption, took place around 232 CE, and ejected some 120 cubic kilometres (29 cu mi) of material (rating 7 on the VEI scale) This included pyroclastic deposits and ash that impacted much of the North Island which was not settled by man at the time.

== Geology ==
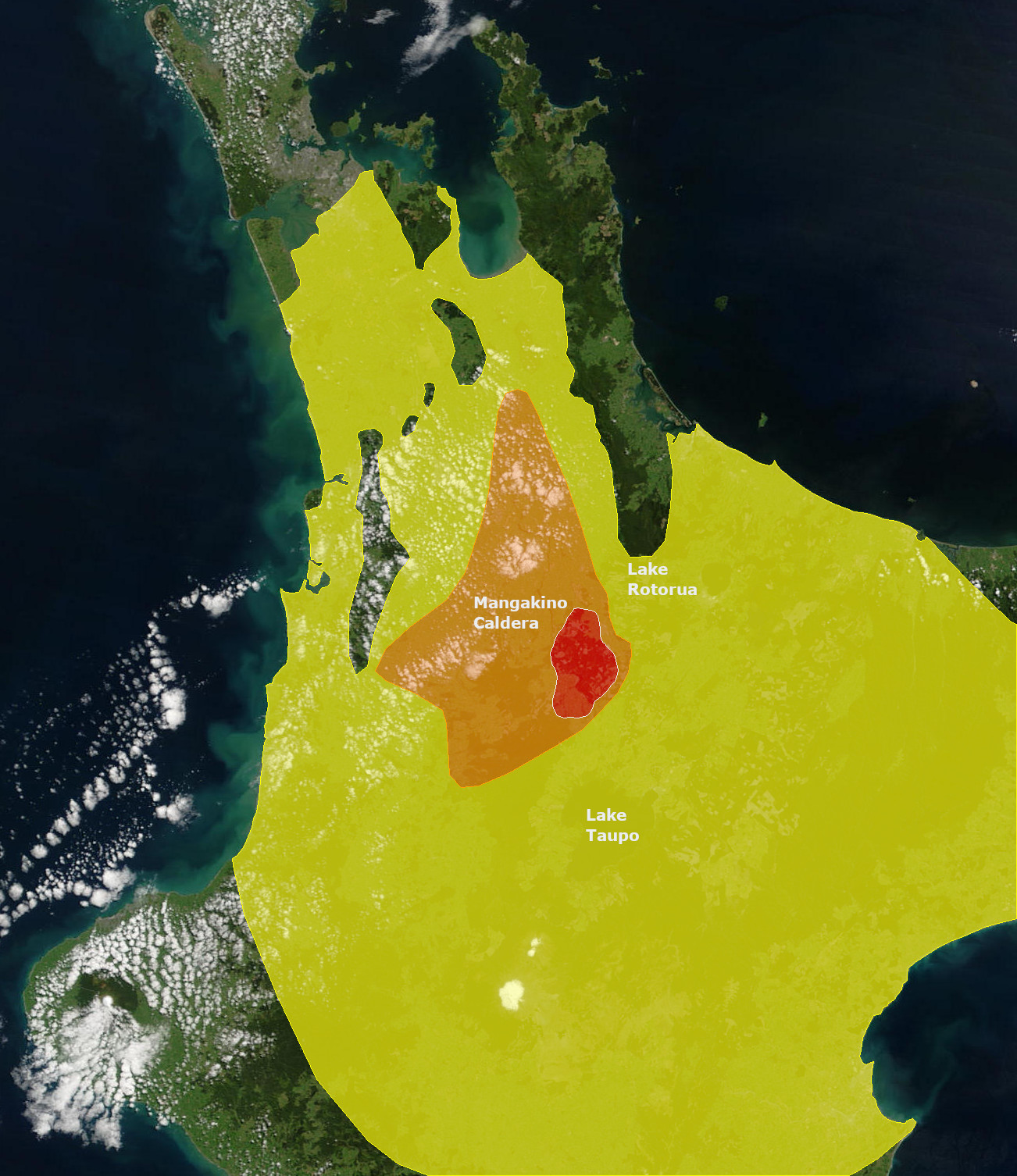
Approximate extent of ignambrite sheets from Kidnappers (yellow) and Rocky Hill eruptions (orange). These still comprise some of the surface deposits mentioned in this article

The large ignimbrite sheets of the North Island Volcanic Plateau extend, under later sedimentary and volcanic deposits, from Hawkes Bay all the way to Auckland. This is as the Kidnappers eruption of a million years ago (1 Ma) produced 1,200 km^{3} (287.9 cu mi) of ignimbrite deposits, the most widespread on Earth, being over 45,000 km^{2} (17,000 sq mi) in area. This eruption had an estimated VEI of 8 and has been assigned a total eruption volume (not just tephra) of 2,760 km^{3} (662.2 cu mi). The basaltic volcanism of the far north is tens of millions of years older than this but towards the south by the Bay of Islands we have basaltic volcanoes that erupted only shortly before human colonisation, being Te Puke at between 1300 and 1800 years ago. Also associated with the 20 million year old Kaikohe-Bay of Islands volcanic field are andesitic and rhyolitic centres. The slightly older 8 million to 250,000 year ago mix of basaltic and dacitic Whangārei volcanic field volcanoes is adjacent to the andestic and dacitic remnants of 22 to 18 million years ago activity of a large stratovolcano off Whangārei Heads Further south is the basaltic Rangitoto Island off Auckland which last erupted about 600 years ago It is part of the a line of monogenetic volcanic fields extending southward as they get older along the west coast from the dormant Auckland volcanic field to the South Auckland volcanic field, then Ngatutura volcanic field and finally the Okete volcanic field. This last is situated on the slopes of the calc-alkalic basaltic stratovolcanoes of the Alexandra Volcanic Group. While considering stratovolcanoes, by Auckland on its west coast is the Waitākere Ranges, which are the andesitic conglomerate remnants of the 23 to 15 million year old Waitākere volcano. Much further south on the west coast is the potentially active andesitic Taranaki group of stratovolcanoes that have a history of collapse events. To the east of Auckland is the dacite stratovolcano of Little Barrier Island that is between 3 and 1.2 million years old and older Great Barrier Island at 18.5 to 12.3 million years. Great Barrier Island leads on to the Coromandel Volcanic Zone which towards its south last erupted about 5 million years ago but has similar timings to Great Barrier to the north. The Coromandel Volcanic Zone contains andesitic and rhyolitic eruptives mainly. Mayor Island just off the Coromandel east coast is a rhyolitic caldera that last erupted only about 6,340 years ago. The Tauranga Volcanic Centre on the east coast was active with andesitic and rhyolitic events between 2.95 and 1.9 million years ago. Inland from the Coromandel and Tauranga are a line of andesitic volcanoes such as Maungatautari that are located on the far side of the Hauraki Rift and have ages of about 1.8 million years. The Hauraki Rift intercepts the Taupō Rift creating the most active area of silicic volcanism on Earth in the Taupō Volcanic Zone. Its northeastern and southeastern portions are active andestic volcanoes while the central calderas erupt rhyolitic ignimbrite with later basaltic eruptions.

== Volcanic areas ==
=== Northland ===
The Northland region contains two recently active volcanic fields, one centred around Whangarei, and the other the Kaikohe-Bay of Islands volcanic field. The latest activity in the Kaikohe-Bay of Islands field, around 1300 to 1800 years ago, created four scoria cones at Te Puke (near Paihia).

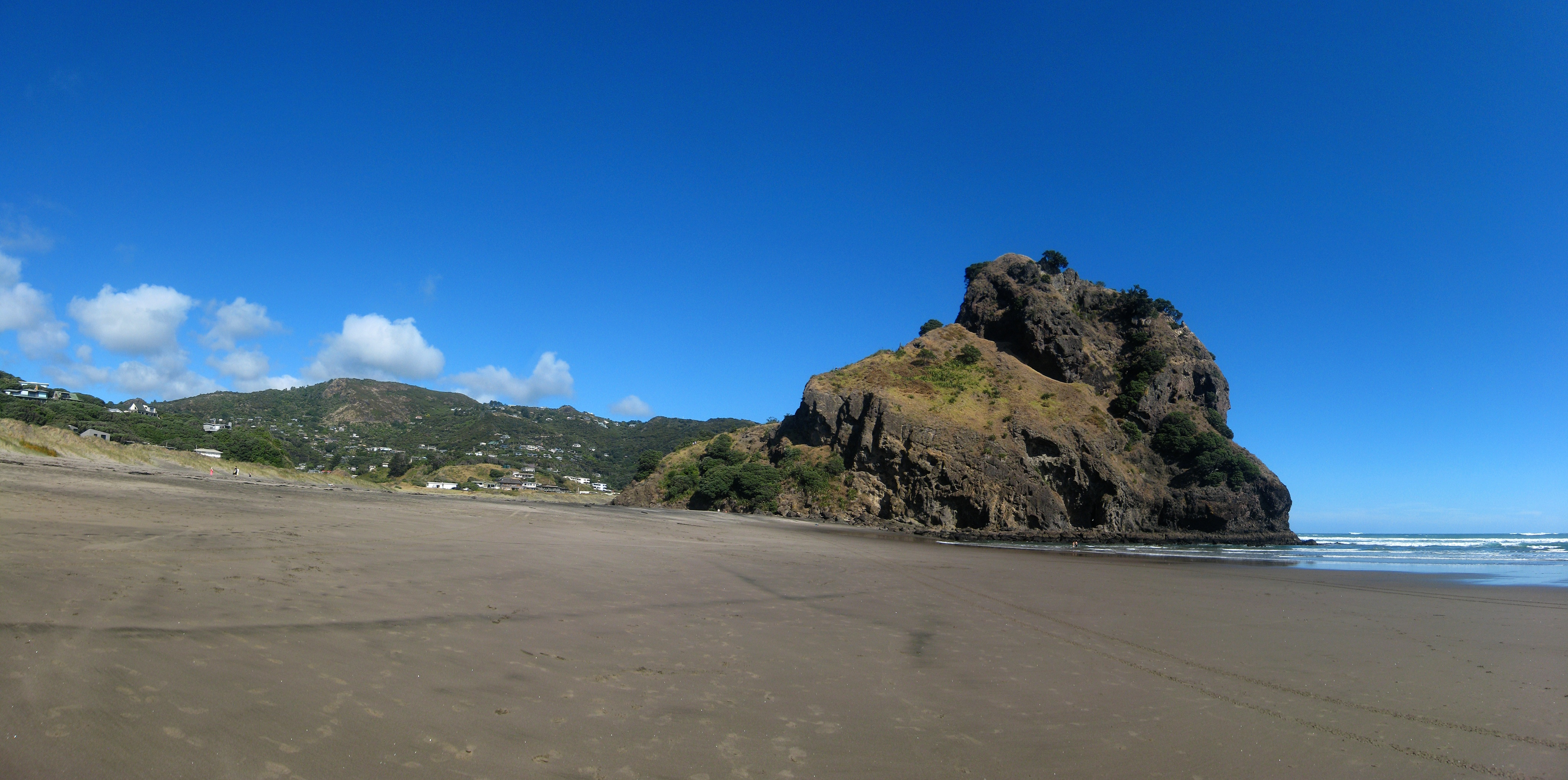
Piha's Lion Rock, an eroded volcanic neck in the western Northland volcanic arc

Earlier, during the Miocene, a mainly andesitic volcanic arc ran through Northland and neighbouring regions (including the Three Kings Ridge and northern Coromandel Peninsula), with western and eastern belts active 25–15 million years ago and 23–11 million years ago respectively. Although this produced substantial volcanic edifices, including New Zealand's largest known stratovolcano, the Waitakere volcano, most of these have been eroded away, buried, or submerged, especially in the west, where a series of volcanoes buried offshore stretches south almost to New Plymouth. This is called the Northland-Mohakatino Volcanic Belt. Remnants of these two ancient volcano belts are still exposed in many places, including Whangarei Heads, the Hen and Chickens Islands, around Whangaroa Harbour, Waipoua forest, and the Waitākere Ranges.

=== Auckland volcanic field ===
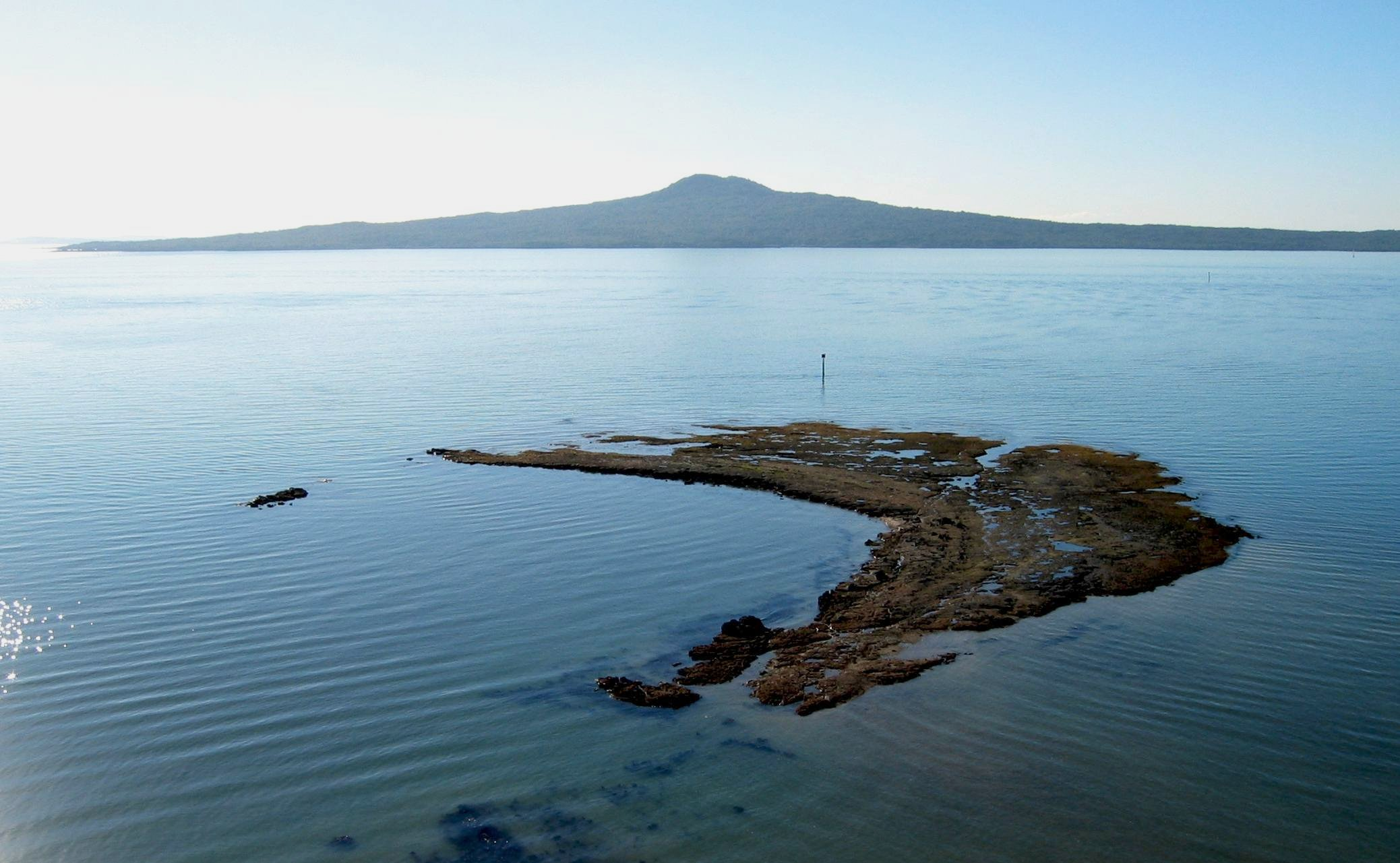
Rangitoto Island, the gently sloping shield volcano on the horizon, is an iconic landmark of Auckland.

The basaltic Auckland volcanic field is a monogenetic volcanic field underlying much of the Auckland metropolitan area. The field's many vents have produced a diverse array of explosion craters, scoria cones, and lava flows. The largest and most recent is Rangitoto in the Hauraki Gulf, which last erupted 600–700 years ago. Currently dormant, the field is likely to erupt again within the next "hundreds to thousands of years" (based on past events), a short timeframe in geologic terms. Auckland's residents, however, face more danger from volcanoes farther south.

Auckland's volcanoes are believed to be the latest product of an unusual magma source related to local tectonics which is not a classic hot spot, as the earlier volcanic fields are to the south, the opposite expected from movement of the Australian Plate over a stationary mantle plume source.

=== Waikato and South Auckland ===
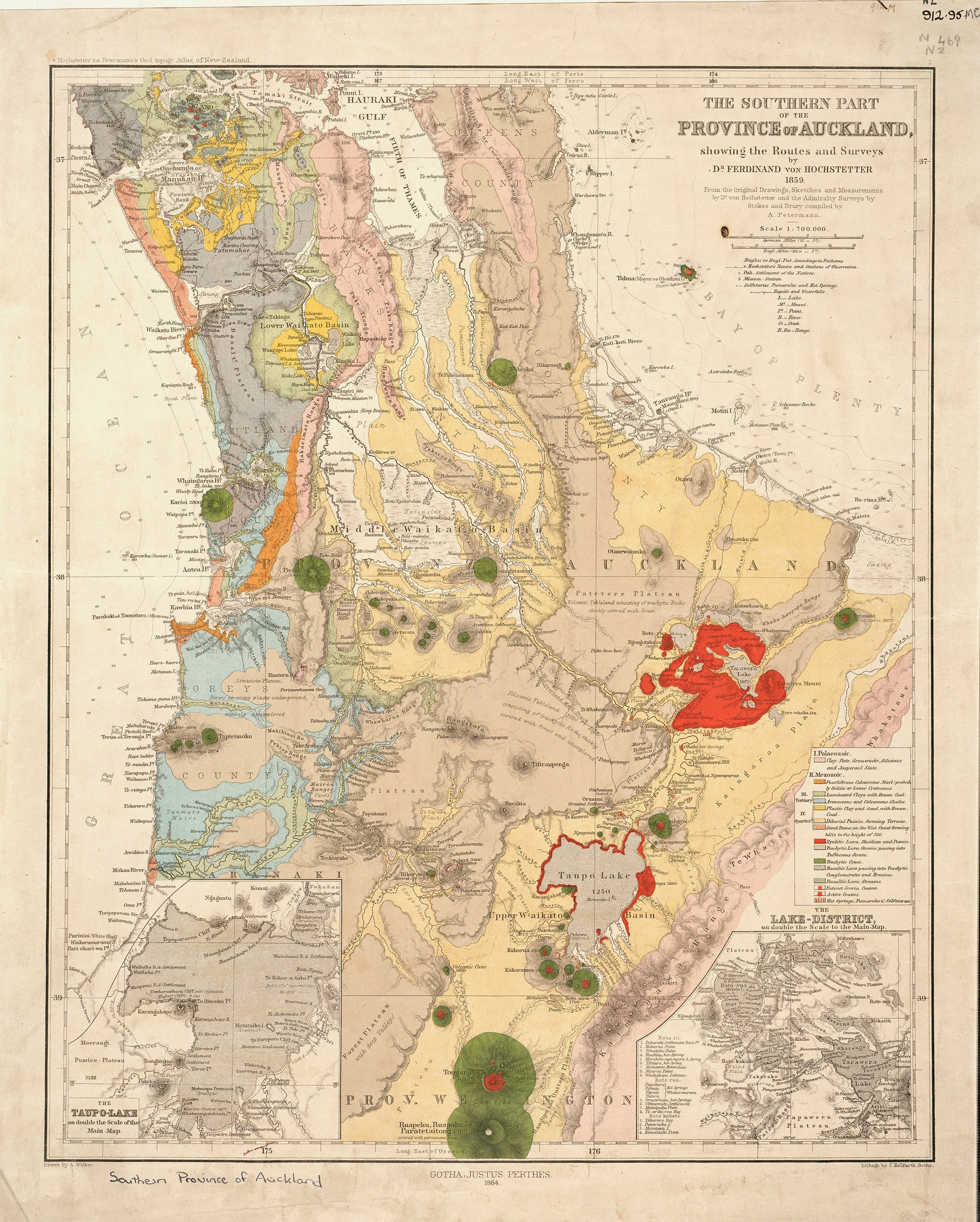
Hochstetter's 1859 geological map of the southern part of the then Auckland Province showing volcanic features of Waikato and South Auckland.

Three volcanic fields erupted between 2.7 and 0.5 million years ago, migrating northwards from Mount Pirongia to the Bombay Hills. The earliest of these fields formed the Alexandra Volcanics which is distinguished by large arc volcano tholeiitic cones but did have associated Okete Volcanics which were traditionally more akaline and oxidised and were in the monogenetic volcanic field pattern seen in the later fields. The distinction between the Alexandra and Okete volcanics is not necessarily clear cut and is still being studied. Alexandra Volcanic Group rocks (mostly basalt) cover about 450 km^{2} amounting to 55 km^{3} from at least 40 vents. Mount Pirongia and Mount Karioi are part of the main lineament in the group. The later fields are the smallest Ngatutura Volcanics which comprises about 16 volcanoes south of Port Waikato on the west coast and the South Auckland volcanic field with over 80 volcanoes. The magma body that created the Auckland volcanic field is considered to have been related to these outpourings also. Unlike typical hot spots such as the one underlying Hawaii, it does not seem to have stayed still, but instead is migrating northward at a faster pace than the surrounding Indo-Australian plate. Its motion has been explained as the tip of a propagating crack produced by the twisting of the North Island's crust.

=== Coromandel Volcanic Zone ===
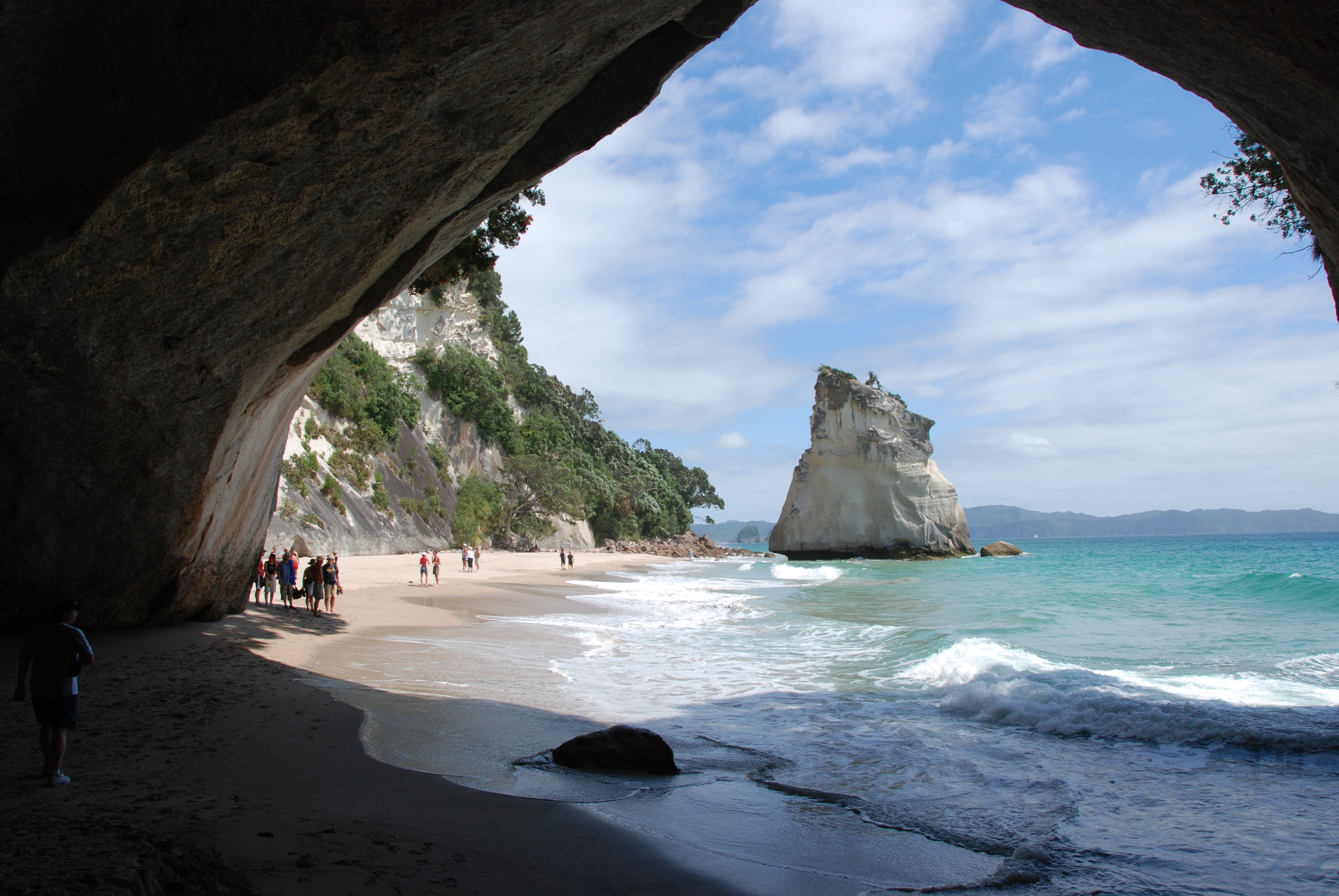
Sea arch at Cathedral Cove, carved in tuff deposited by a pyroclastic flow about 8 million years ago

The extinct Coromandel Volcanic Zone (CVZ) was a volcanic arc stretching from Great Barrier Island in the north, through the Coromandel Peninsula, to Tauranga and the southern Kaimai Ranges in the south. Activity began in the north around 18 million years ago, and was primarily andesitic until around 9–10 million years ago, when it changed to a bimodal basaltic/rhyolitic pattern. Eruptive centres gradually migrated southward, where they transitioned into early activity in the Taupō Volcanic Zone. Later activity in the CVZ and its interface with the Taupō Volcanic Zone is obscured by subsequent events and is not fully understood, but continued in the south until perhaps 1.5 million years ago in the Tauranga Volcanic Centre. Together with the extinct undersea Colville Ridge, the CVZ formed a precursor to the modern Taupō Volcanic Zone and Kermadec Ridge.

=== Mayor Island / Tūhua ===
Mayor Island / Tūhua is a peralkaline shield volcano with a caldera partly formed in a large eruption some 7000 years ago. It has exhibited many eruptive styles, and its last eruption may have occurred only 500–1000 years ago. The island's Maori name, Tūhua, refers to the black obsidian, a volcanic glass created by the rapid cooling of silica-rich lava they found on the island and prized for its sharp cutting edge. The distinctive purple crystal mineral tuhualite (Na,K)Fe_{2}Si_{6}O_{15} has the island's volcano as its only known source.

=== Taupō Volcanic Zone ===
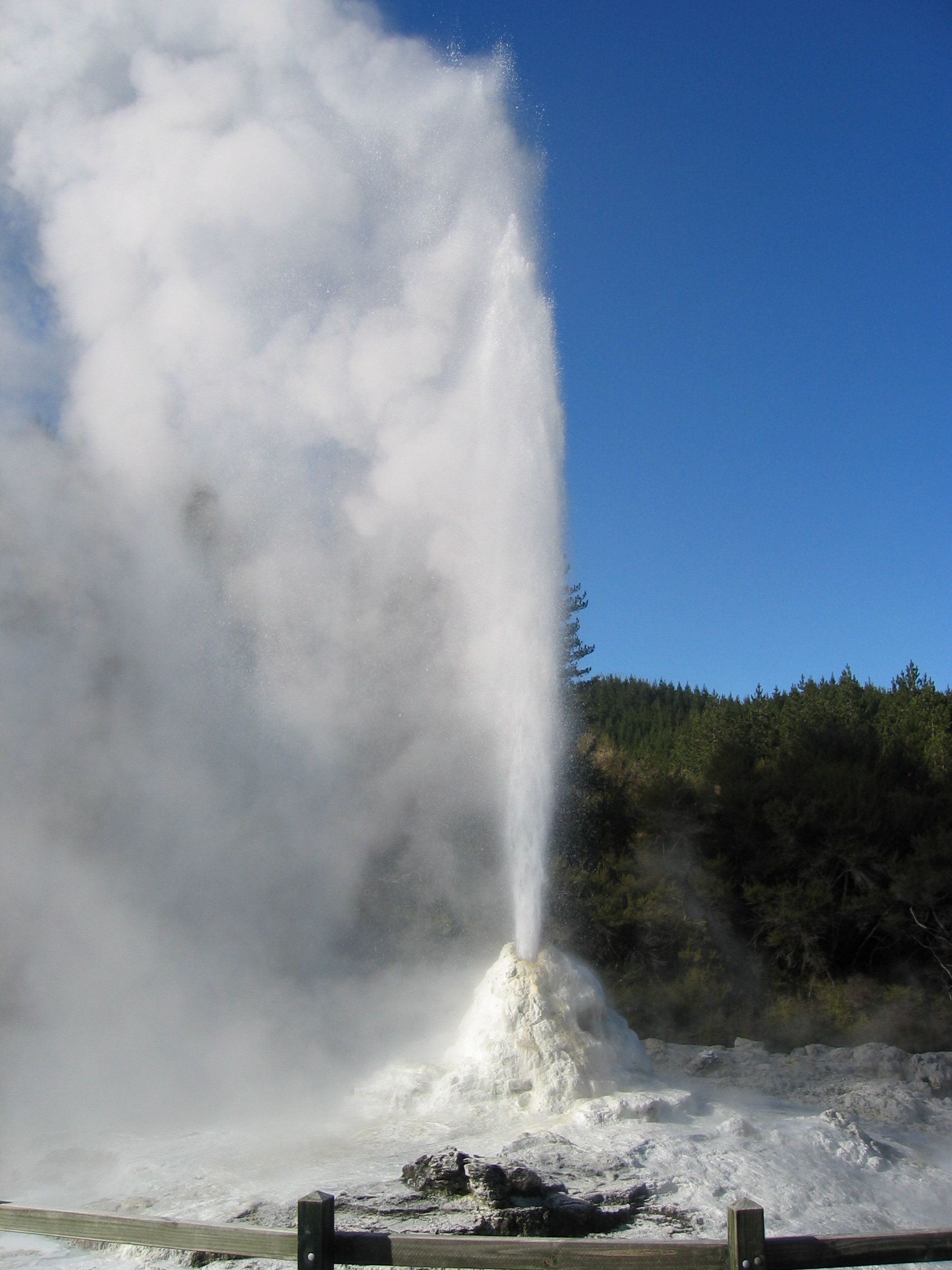
Lady Knox Geyser, in the Waiotapu geothermal area

About 350 kilometres long by 50 kilometres wide, the Taupō Volcanic Zone (TVZ) is the world's most productive area of recent silicic volcanic activity, with the highest concentration of young rhyolitic volcanoes. Mount Ruapehu marks its southwestern end, and it continues up through Ngauruhoe, Tongariro, Lake Taupō, the Whakamaru, Mangakino, Maroa, Reporoa, and Rotorua calderas, the Okataina Volcanic Complex (including Mount Tarawera) and 85 kilometres beyond Whakaari / White Island to the submarine Whakatāne Seamount. The TVZ also contains numerous smaller volcanoes, along with geysers and geothermal areas. Volcanic eruptions began here around two million years ago, with silicic eruptions starting around 1.55 million years ago, as activity shifted southeast from the Coromandel Volcanic Zone.

=== Taranaki ===
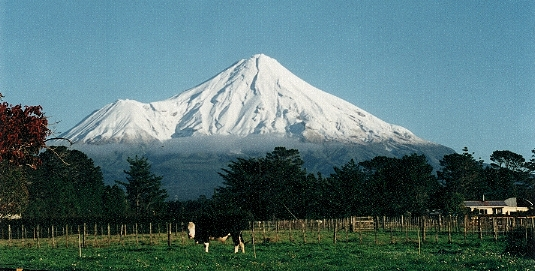
Mount Taranaki, with Fanthams Peak on the left

Volcanism in the Taranaki region has migrated southeastward during the last two million years. Beginning in the Sugar Loaf Islands, near New Plymouth, activity then shifted to Kaitake (580,000 years ago) and Pouākai (230,000 years ago) before creating the large stratovolcano called Mount Taranaki, (former name Mount Egmont), which last erupted in 1854, and its satellite vent, Fanthams Peak. This southeastward migration is the continuation of the 25 million year activity of the Northland-Mohakatino Volcanic Belt that extends mainly under the present Tasman Sea from the west of Northland down to Mount Taranaki.

== Attribution ==
Copied content from Volcanism of New Zealand on pages creation date; see Volcanism of New Zealand: Revision history for attribution.
