= Tokanui, Waikato =

Settlement in Waikato, New Zealand

Tokanui
- Village
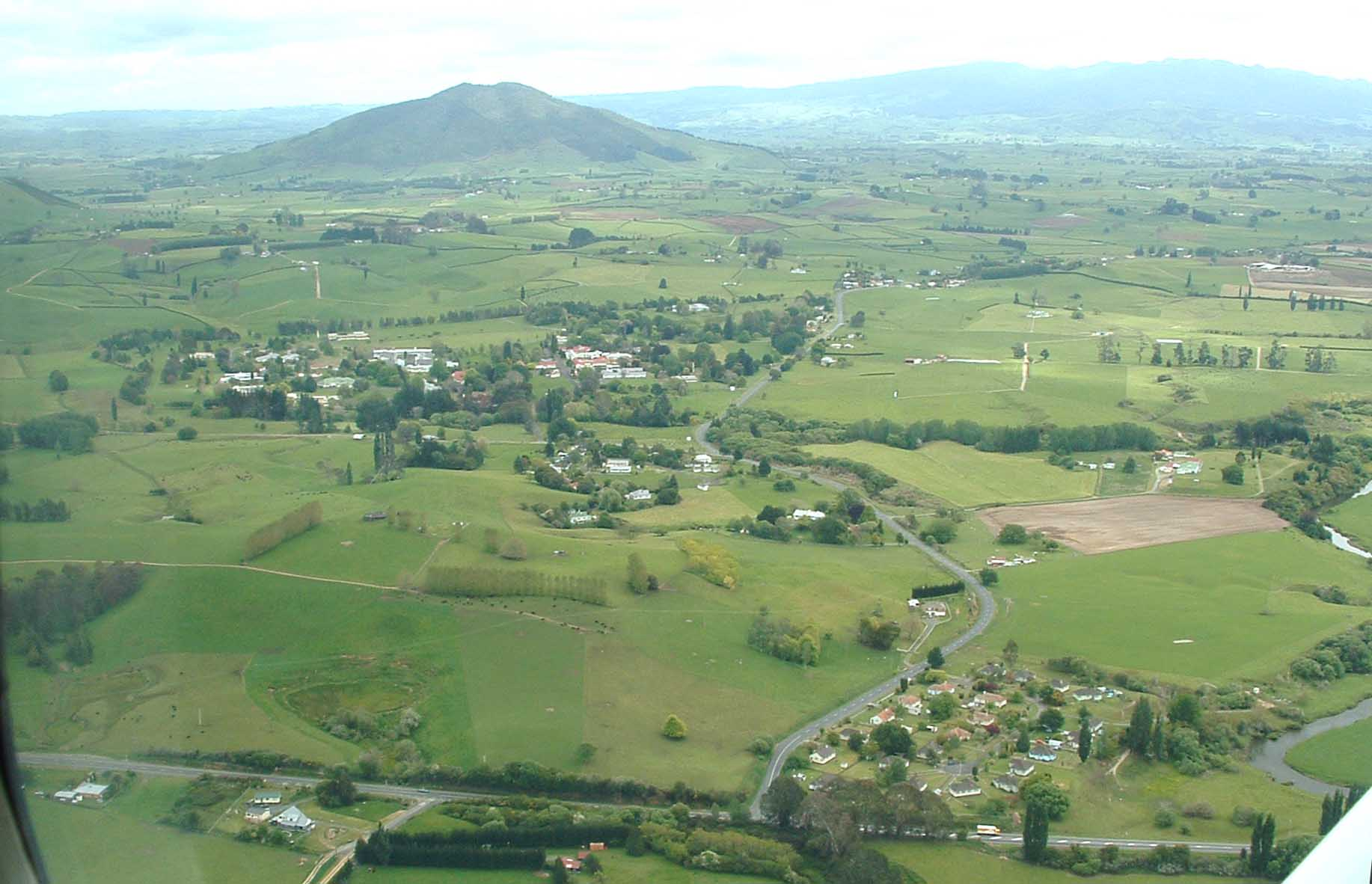
- Tokanui Hospital in the centre left, Tokanui Settlement in the foreground and Mount Kakepuku in the background
- Interactive map of Tokanui
- Coordinates: 38.063°S 175.332°E
- Country: New Zealand
- Region: Waikato
- District: Waipā District
- Ward: Pirongia-Kakepuku General Ward
- Community: Te Awamutu-Kihikihi Community
- Electorates: Taranaki-King Country; Te Tai Hauāuru (Māori)

Government
  - Territorial Authority: Waipā District Council
  - Regional council: Waikato Regional Council
  - Mayor of Waipa: Mike Pettit
  - Taranaki-King Country MP: Barbara Kuriger
  - Te Tai Hauāuru MP: Debbie Ngarewa-Packer

Area
  - Territorial: 7.90 km^{2} (3.05 sq mi)

Population (2023 Census)
  - Territorial: 153
  - Density: 19.4/km^{2} (50.2/sq mi)
- Time zone: UTC+12 (NZST)
  - Summer (DST): UTC+13 (NZDT)

Tokanui is a rural locality in the Waipā District and Waikato region of New Zealand's North Island.

It is located southwest of Te Awamutu. State Highway 3 runs to the east of the locality.

== History ==
Te Mawhai railway station operated from 1887 to 1962, originally as Te Puhi railway station.

Tokanui is the site of the former Tokanui Psychiatric Hospital, which operated from 1912 to 1997. The closure of the hospital resulted in the loss of 600 jobs, and there was little alternative employment available in the area.

=== Tokanui Crossroads Hall ===
The hall, at 4 Te Kawa Road, about 4 km (2.5 mi) south of Tokanui, opened on 18 January 1928. It is a converted casein factory, which had been working since at least 1919.

== Etymology ==
Tokanui is a name used for 6 locations in North Island (Te Ika-a-Māui). It is thought to be a corruption of Tāiko nui, a large petrel. Tokanui is also the name of a village in Southland, where its origin is thought to be the Māori words for rock (toka) and large, or many (nui).

== Demographics ==
Tokanui settlement and its surrounds cover 7.90 km^{2} (3.05 sq mi). The settlement is part of the larger Tokanui statistical area.

Historical population of Tokanui settlement and surrounds
| Year | Pop. | ±% p.a. |
|---|---|---|
| 2006 | 153 | — |
| 2013 | 162 | +0.82% |
| 2018 | 144 | −2.33% |
| 2023 | 153 | +1.22% |

Tokanui had a population of 153 in the 2023 New Zealand census, an increase of 9 people (6.2%) since the 2018 census, and a decrease of 9 people (−5.6%) since the 2013 census. There were 75 males and 75 females in 51 dwellings. 2.0% of people identified as LGBTIQ+. The median age was 39.9 years (compared with 38.1 years nationally). There were 33 people (21.6%) aged under 15 years, 30 (19.6%) aged 15 to 29, 63 (41.2%) aged 30 to 64, and 24 (15.7%) aged 65 or older.

People could identify as more than one ethnicity. The results were 58.8% European (Pākehā), 54.9% Māori, and 2.0% Pasifika. English was spoken by 92.2%, and Māori by 15.7%. No language could be spoken by 5.9% (e.g. too young to talk). The percentage of people born overseas was 2.0, compared with 28.8% nationally.

Religious affiliations were 21.6% Christian, and 3.9% Māori religious beliefs. People who answered that they had no religion were 66.7%, and 7.8% of people did not answer the census question.

Of those at least 15 years old, 12 (10.0%) people had a bachelor's or higher degree, 63 (52.5%) had a post-high school certificate or diploma, and 39 (32.5%) people exclusively held high school qualifications. The median income was $35,700, compared with $41,500 nationally. 6 people (5.0%) earned over $100,000 compared to 12.1% nationally. The employment status of those at least 15 was 54 (45.0%) full-time, 9 (7.5%) part-time, and 3 (2.5%) unemployed.

=== Tokanui statistical area ===
Tokanui statistical area covers 23.68 km^{2} (9.14 sq mi) and had an estimated population of 460 as of June 2025, with a population density of 19 people per km^{2}.

Historical population of the statistical area
| Year | Pop. | ±% p.a. |
|---|---|---|
| 2006 | 426 | — |
| 2013 | 441 | +0.50% |
| 2018 | 435 | −0.27% |
| 2023 | 441 | +0.27% |

Tokanui had a population of 441 in the 2023 New Zealand census, an increase of 6 people (1.4%) since the 2018 census, and unchanged since the 2013 census. There were 222 males and 219 females in 147 dwellings. 2.0% of people identified as LGBTIQ+. The median age was 36.5 years (compared with 38.1 years nationally). There were 93 people (21.1%) aged under 15 years, 99 (22.4%) aged 15 to 29, 189 (42.9%) aged 30 to 64, and 60 (13.6%) aged 65 or older.

People could identify as more than one ethnicity. The results were 61.2% European (Pākehā), 53.1% Māori, 3.4% Pasifika, and 3.4% Asian. English was spoken by 94.6%, Māori by 15.0%, and other languages by 4.1%. No language could be spoken by 3.4% (e.g. too young to talk). New Zealand Sign Language was known by 0.7%. The percentage of people born overseas was 10.2, compared with 28.8% nationally.

Religious affiliations were 29.3% Christian, 0.7% Hindu, 6.1% Māori religious beliefs, and 0.7% other religions. People who answered that they had no religion were 57.8%, and 6.1% of people did not answer the census question.

Of those at least 15 years old, 42 (12.1%) people had a bachelor's or higher degree, 195 (56.0%) had a post-high school certificate or diploma, and 111 (31.9%) people exclusively held high school qualifications. The median income was $37,400, compared with $41,500 nationally. 15 people (4.3%) earned over $100,000 compared to 12.1% nationally. The employment status of those at least 15 was 177 (50.9%) full-time, 39 (11.2%) part-time, and 9 (2.6%) unemployed.

== Tokanui hill ==
Tokanui hill is 165 m (541 ft) high and an extinct arc basalt Alexandra Volcanic Group volcano. It rises about 30 m (98 ft) from the surrounding hills, formed of Puketoka (3.1m year old pumice sandstone, including peat) and Karapiro (younger pumice sandstone of silt, sand and clay) Formations, and about 100 m (330 ft) above the surrounding land and lies about 5 km (3.1 mi) south of the village, just to the west of SH3. The hill has been quarried since 1925, as Osterns, Te Kawa or McFalls Quarry. Argillitic greywacke, one of the Manaia Hill group of rocks, of Late Jurassic to Early Cretaceous age, is used for aggregate. There are three pā sites on the hill, Whiti Te Marama, Tokonui and Pukerimu, which are linked to Ngāti Whakatere and Ngāti Maniapoto.
