= Te Kawa =

Settlement in Waikato, New Zealand

- Village
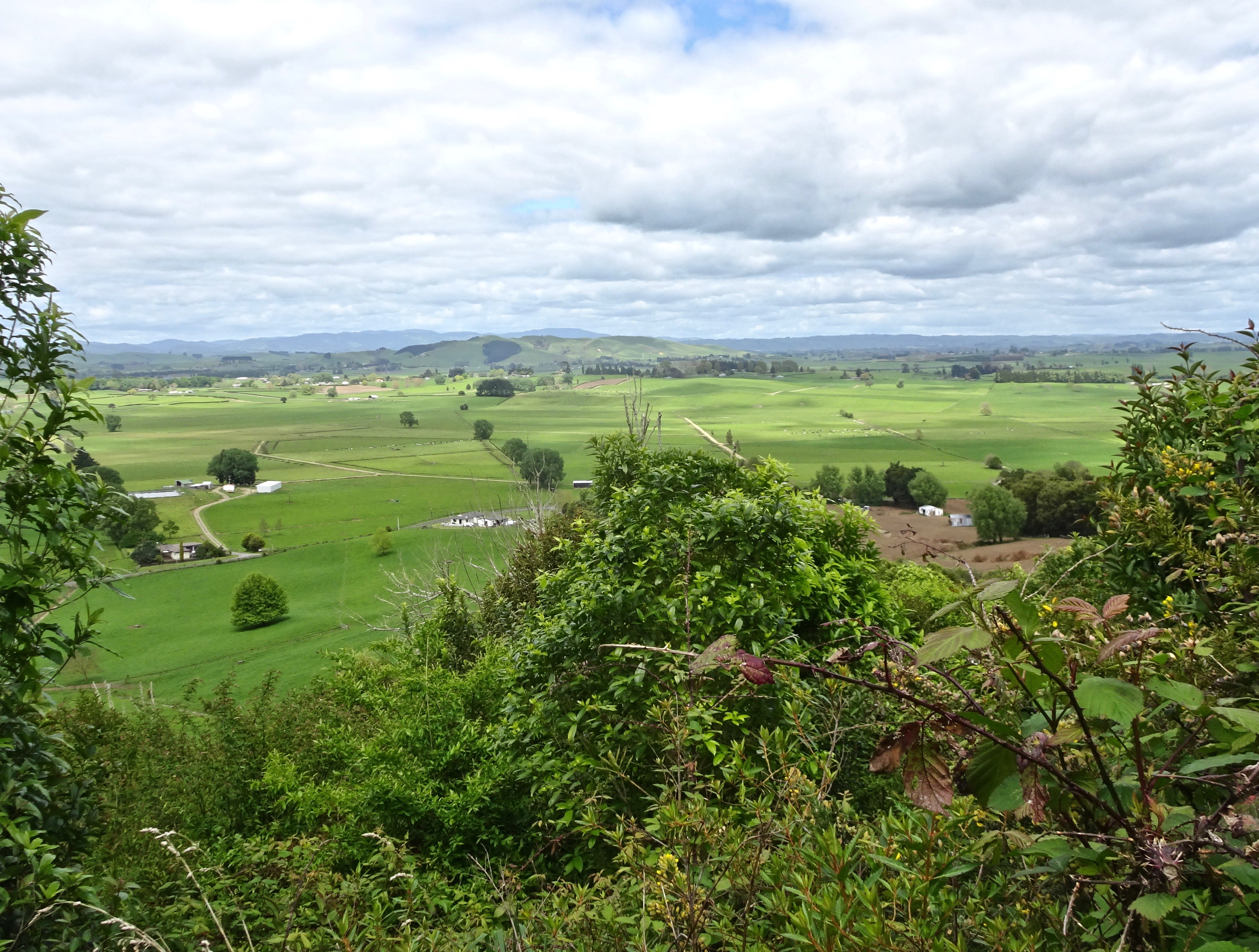
- Te Kawa swamp, village and Puketarata hill from Kakepuku
- Interactive map of Te Kawa
- Country: New Zealand
- Region: Waikato Region
- District: Ōtorohanga District
- Ward: Kāwhia-Tihiroa General Ward; Kiokio-Korakonui General Ward
- Electorates: Taranaki-King Country; Te Tai Hauāuru (Māori)

Government
  - Territorial Authority: Ōtorohanga District Council
  - Regional council: Waikato Regional Council
  - Mayor of Ōtorohanga: Rodney Dow
  - Taranaki-King Country MP: Barbara Kuriger
  - Te Tai Hauāuru MP: Debbie Ngarewa-Packer

Area
  - Territorial: 40.30 km^{2} (15.56 sq mi)

Population (2023 Census)
  - Territorial: 453
  - Density: 11.2/km^{2} (29.1/sq mi)
- Time zone: UTC+12 (NZST)
  - Summer (DST): UTC+13 (NZDT)

Te Kawa is a rural community in the Ōtorohanga District and Waikato region of New Zealand's North Island. It lies just to the south of the volcanic hills of Kakepuku and Te Kawa. Until the swamp was drained in the 1900s, Te Kawa was well known for its eels.

Te Kawa railway station, a station on the North Island Main Trunk, was located in the area. It operated from 9 March 1887 and closed 17 October 1971.

A post office was open by 1909 and a dairy factory and a school existed in 1913. Te Kawa Bridge over the Waipā opened in 1915. A town hall opened in 1928.

Te Whakaaro Kotahi Marae in Te Kawa is a meeting ground of the Ngāti Maniapoto hapū of Te Kanawa. It includes a small building.

== Demographics ==
Te Kawa locality covers 40.30 km^{2} (15.56 sq mi). The locality is part of the larger Te Kawa statistical area.

Historical population for the locality
Year	Pop.	±% p.a.
2006	450	—
2013	420	−0.98%
2018	504	+3.71%
2023	453	−2.11%

Te Kawa locality had a population of 453 in the 2023 New Zealand census, a decrease of 51 people (−10.1%) since the 2018 census, and an increase of 33 people (7.9%) since the 2013 census. There were 243 males and 216 females in 153 dwellings. 1.3% of people identified as LGBTIQ+. There were 117 people (25.8%) aged under 15 years, 69 (15.2%) aged 15 to 29, 216 (47.7%) aged 30 to 64, and 54 (11.9%) aged 65 or older.

People could identify as more than one ethnicity. The results were 90.7% European (Pākehā); 15.2% Māori; 1.3% Pasifika; 4.0% Asian; 0.7% Middle Eastern, Latin American and African New Zealanders (MELAA); and 5.3% other, which includes people giving their ethnicity as "New Zealander". English was spoken by 98.7%, Māori by 3.3%, and other languages by 3.3%. No language could be spoken by 2.6% (e.g. too young to talk). New Zealand Sign Language was known by 0.7%. The percentage of people born overseas was 9.9, compared with 28.8% nationally.

Religious affiliations were 28.5% Christian, 0.7% Māori religious beliefs, and 2.6% other religions. People who answered that they had no religion were 60.9%, and 8.6% of people did not answer the census question.

Of those at least 15 years old, 45 (13.4%) people had a bachelor's or higher degree, 213 (63.4%) had a post-high school certificate or diploma, and 84 (25.0%) people exclusively held high school qualifications. 33 people (9.8%) earned over $100,000 compared to 12.1% nationally. The employment status of those at least 15 was 204 (60.7%) full-time, 48 (14.3%) part-time, and 3 (0.9%) unemployed.

=== Te Kawa statistical area ===
Te Kawa statistical area, which also includes Kio Kio, covers 114.62 km^{2} (44.26 sq mi). It had an estimated population of 1,250 as of June 2025, with a population density of 10.9 people per km^{2}.

Historical population of the statistical area
Year	Pop.	±% p.a.
2006	1,068	—
2013	1,074	+0.08%
2018	1,209	+2.40%
2023	1,182	−0.45%

Te Kawa statistical area had a population of 1,182 in the 2023 New Zealand census, a decrease of 27 people (−2.2%) since the 2018 census, and an increase of 108 people (10.1%) since the 2013 census. There were 606 males, 576 females, and 3 people of other genders in 411 dwellings. 1.5% of people identified as LGBTIQ+. The median age was 35.6 years (compared with 38.1 years nationally). There were 285 people (24.1%) aged under 15 years, 201 (17.0%) aged 15 to 29, 546 (46.2%) aged 30 to 64, and 150 (12.7%) aged 65 or older.

People could identify as more than one ethnicity. The results were 87.6% European (Pākehā); 16.5% Māori; 2.3% Pasifika; 4.3% Asian; 0.5% Middle Eastern, Latin American and African New Zealanders (MELAA); and 4.3% other, which includes people giving their ethnicity as "New Zealander". English was spoken by 97.5%, Māori by 3.3%, and other languages by 4.8%. No language could be spoken by 2.3% (e.g. too young to talk). New Zealand Sign Language was known by 0.3%. The percentage of people born overseas was 11.9, compared with 28.8% nationally.

Religious affiliations were 27.2% Christian, 0.3% Hindu, 0.3% Islam, 0.5% Māori religious beliefs, 1.0% Buddhist, 0.3% New Age, and 2.0% other religions. People who answered that they had no religion were 59.9%, and 8.9% of people did not answer the census question.

Of those at least 15 years old, 135 (15.1%) people had a bachelor's or higher degree, 549 (61.2%) had a post-high school certificate or diploma, and 204 (22.7%) people exclusively held high school qualifications. The median income was $48,600, compared with $41,500 nationally. 90 people (10.0%) earned over $100,000 compared to 12.1% nationally. The employment status of those at least 15 was 540 (60.2%) full-time, 138 (15.4%) part-time, and 9 (1.0%) unemployed.

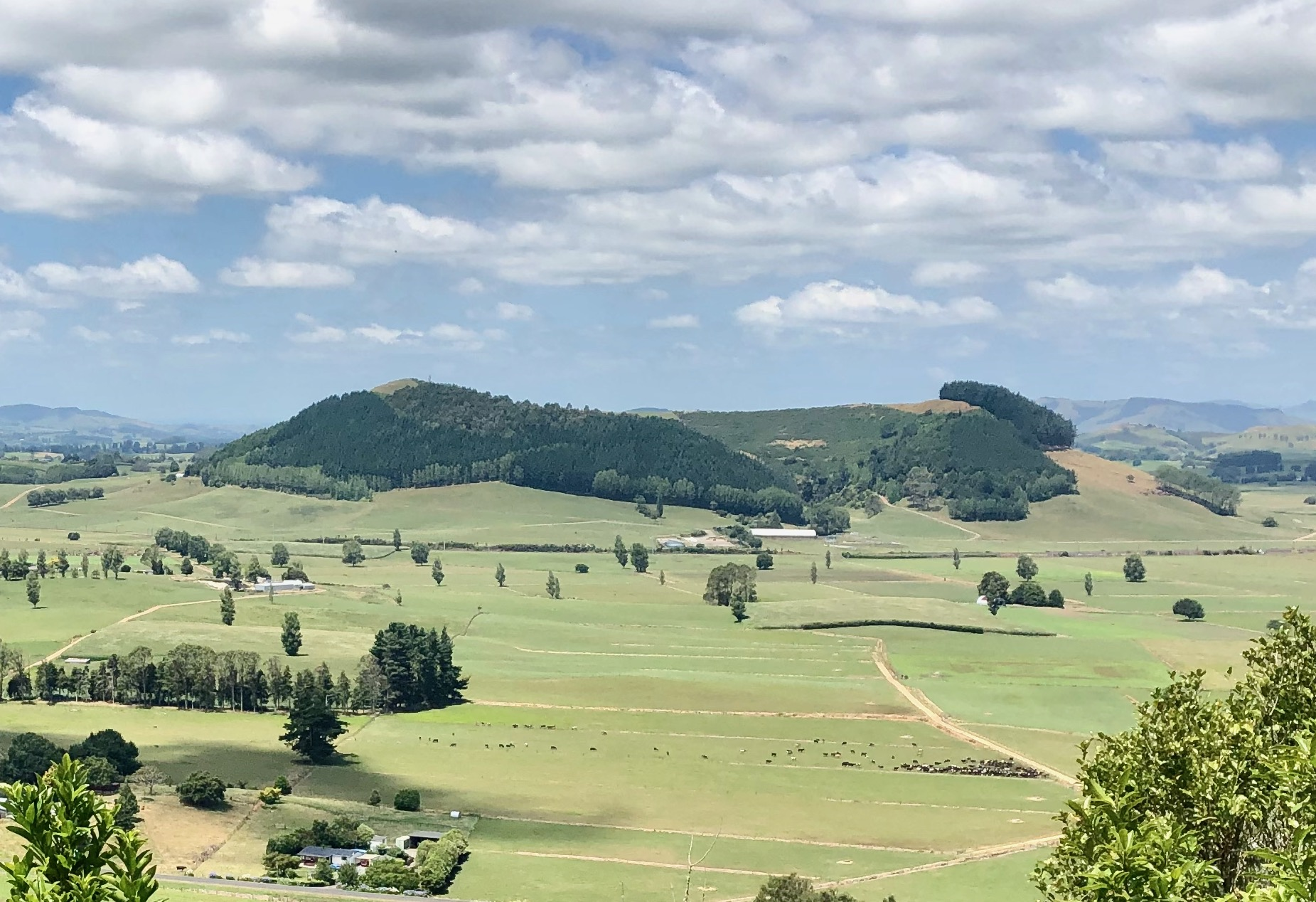
Te Kawa hill from Kakepuku.

== Te Kawa hill ==
Te Kawa hill is 214 m (702 ft) high and just to the north of the village. The 'Geology of the Waikato Area' says, "The Alexandra Volcanic Group consists of several low-angle composite cones, including Karioi, Pirongia, Kakepuku, Te Kawa and Tokanui volcanoes, aligned southeast from Mount Karioi on the coast to Tokanui." It was formed in the Late Pliocene to earliest Pleistocene of subduction-related basaltic magmas. Te Kawa is the only Alexandra Volcanic with a crater remaining. Outcrops of coarse tuff and lapilli tuff are on the north and northeast sides of the crater and basalt boulders with augite megacrysts in the crater.

There is a pā site on the south side of the crater, with ramparts up to 6 ft (1.8 m) high and ditches up to 16 ft (4.9 m) deep. There are also several pits and terraces.
