= Geology of the Auckland Region =

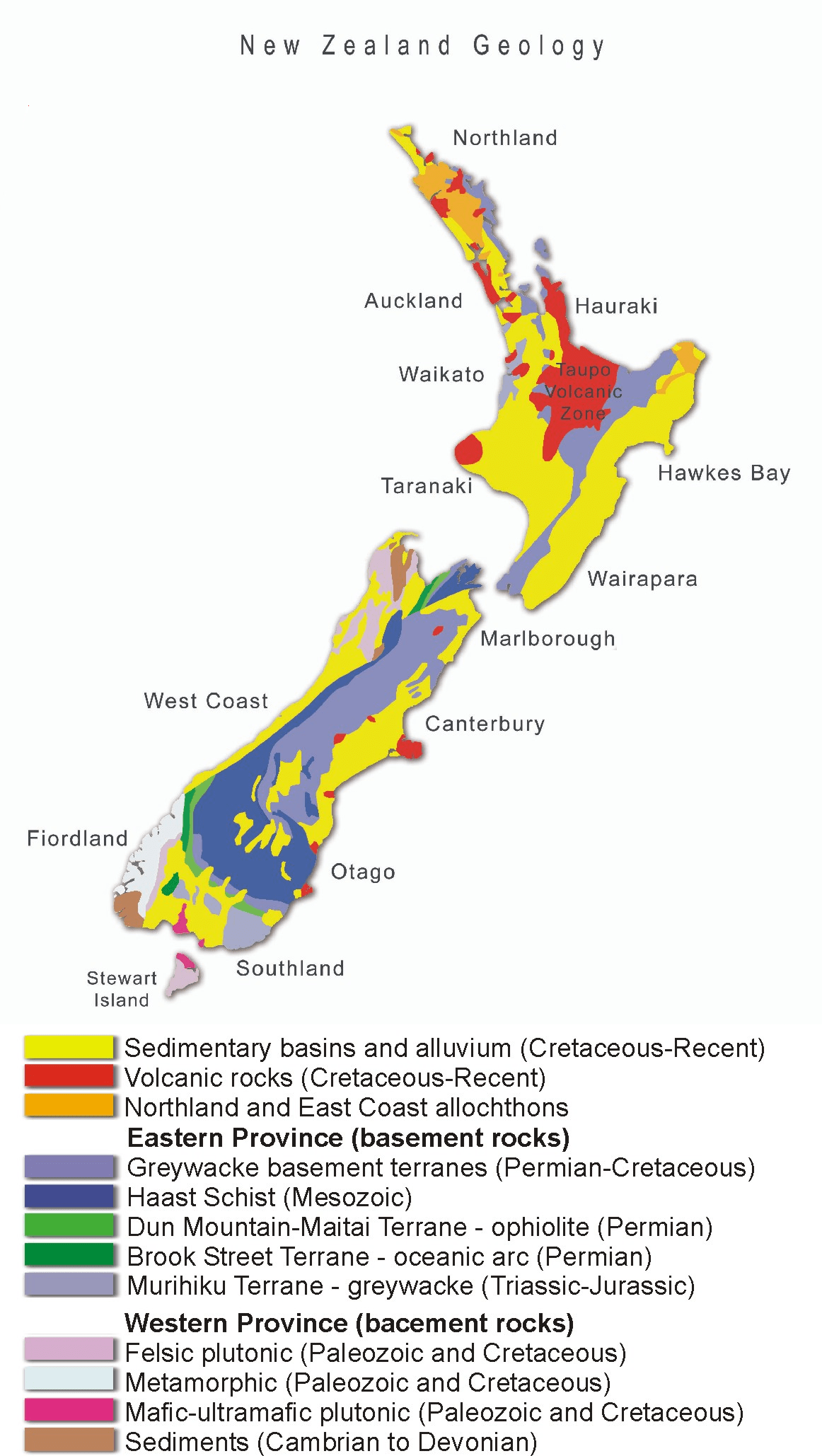
New Zealand geology map to provide context

The Auckland region of New Zealand is built on a basement of greywacke rocks that form many of the islands in the Hauraki Gulf, the Hunua Ranges, and land south of Port Waikato. The Waitākere Ranges in the west are the remains of a large andesitic volcano, and Great Barrier Island was formed by the northern end of the Coromandel Volcanic Zone. The Auckland isthmus and North Shore are composed of Waitemata sandstone and mudstone, and portions of the Northland Allochthon extend as far south as Albany. Little Barrier Island was formed by a relatively isolated andesitic volcano, active around 1 to 3 million years ago.

The Manukau and South Kaipara Harbours are protected by the recent sand dune deposits of the Āwhitu and South Kaipara Peninsulas. Recent basaltic volcanic activity has produced many volcanic cones throughout the Auckland region, including the iconic and youngest volcano Rangitoto Island.

== Basement rocks ==
As with most of New Zealand, the basement rocks of the Auckland region are composed of greywacke (indurated sandstone, siltstone and mudstone).

Murihiku terrane greywacke lies beneath the Auckland region on the western side, and outcrops south of the Waikato River. The Murihiku terrane is considered to be an accretionary wedge of mainly volcanogenic forearc sediments. It was formed in Late Triassic to Late Jurassic times (220-145 Ma).

A line of Dun Mountain–Maitai terrane rocks are assumed to pass north–south through the centre of the Auckland region, separating the Murihiku terrane and Waipapa composite terrane. The existence of this terrane at depth is inferred from its distinctive magnetic anomaly (Junction Magnetic Anomaly or JMA) and xenoliths in the Auckland Volcanic Field. Some Murihiku rocks occur to the east of the JMA, forming the Taupiri and Hakarimata Ranges, but it is assumed that these rocks have been shifted to their present position.

Hunua terrane greywacke lies beneath the Auckland region on the eastern side, as far south as the Hunua Ranges, and outcrops in the Hunua Ranges, many islands in the Hauraki Gulf (Waiheke, Motutapu, Motuihe, Tiritiri Matangi, Kawau, etc.), and Tawharanui Peninsula. It sometimes includes Chert and Argillite. The rocks are generally fine grained and highly deformed. It was formed in Late Triassic to Late Jurassic times (220-145 Ma).

The Morrinsville terrane greywacke lies beneath the Auckland region on the eastern side, south of the Hunua Ranges, and further east to the Coromandel Peninsula. The rocks are generally coarser grained, with massive sandstones and conglomerate. It was formed in late Jurassic to early Cretaceous times (160–120 Ma).

== Te Kuiti Group coal and limestone ==
The Te Kuiti Group rocks overlie the basement rocks, and are present in Northland, Auckland, the Waikato, and King Country, although they have often been eroded or covered. Rocks containing coal were formed from swampland in Late Eocene times (37-34 Ma). The land sank and the sea transgressed, and calcareous sandstone, mudstone, and limestone was deposited in Oligocene times (34-24 Ma).

The coal deposits outcrop near Huntly and Maramarua, where they are mined.

Flaggy limestone bluffs are located in the area south and west of the Waikato River.

== Northland Allochthon ==
In early Miocene times (24–21 Ma), a series of thrust sheets were emplaced over Northland, extending as far south as the Kaipara Harbour and Albany areas. The rocks came from the northeast, and were emplaced in reverse order, but the right way up. The original rocks are of Cretaceous to Oligocene age (90–25 Ma), and include mudstones, limestone and basalt lava. These rocks outcrop around Silverdale, Warkworth, and Wellsford, reaching as far south as Albany.

== West Coast volcanism ==
A volcanic arc became active to the west of the current land in Northland in Miocene times (23 Ma), and gradually moved south down to Taranaki. It produced mainly andesitic strato-volcanoes. Volcanoes were produced in what is now sea to the west of the Auckland region, near the Kaipara Harbour and Waitākere Ranges (22-16 Ma), and Waikato Heads (14-8 Ma).

The Waitākere volcano has mainly been eroded, but conglomerate from the volcano formed the Waitākere Ranges. The Waitākere Ranges also contain many dikes, volcanic plugs, etc., that formed part of this volcano.

== Waitemata sandstone ==
While the volcanic activity occurred to the west, a rapidly deepening basin developed further to the east, in the Auckland area.

These Early Miocene volcanoes, along with the Northland Allochthon, eroded and deposited most of the material that makes up the Waitemata sandstones and mudstones in the Waitemata Basin. The Waitemata sandstones and mudstones form the cliffs around the Waitematā Harbour and East Coast Bays, and land further north up to Cape Rodney, with outcrops further south down to Mercer and Miranda. Lahars produced the coarser Parnell Grit, found in many headlands around the East Coast Bays. Greywacke pebble beaches can be seen forming a layer in Waitemata sandstone cliffs on Motutapu Island.

== Coromandel volcanism ==
Map of selected surface volcanic features in the Auckland region which includes features from volcanic activity in recorded historic times in New Zealand. Legend: Key for the volcanics that are shown with panning is: basalt (shades of brown/orange); monogenetic basalts; undifferentiated basalts of the Tangihua Complex in Northland Allochthon; arc basalts; arc ring basalts; dacite; andesite (shades of red); basaltic andesite; rhyolite (ignimbrite is lighter shades of violet); plutonic; White shading is selected caldera features.; Clicking on the rectangle icon enables full window and mouse-over with volcano name/wikilink and ages before present.

Shortly after (18 Ma), a volcanic arc developed further east to create the Coromandel Ranges and undersea Colville Ridge. The initial activity was andesitic, but later became rhyolytic (12 Ma). In the Kauaeranga Valley, volcanic plugs remain, as does a lava lake that now forms the top of Table Mountain. Active geothermal systems, similar to those that now exist near Rotorua, were present around 6 Ma, and produced the gold and silver deposits that were later mined in the Coromandel gold rush. Later (5-2 Ma), volcanic activity moved further south to form the Kaimai Ranges.

The Hauraki Plains and Hauraki Gulf represent a rift valley. The Coromandel Ranges used to be much closer to Auckland, and the rift valley is assumed to have developed about 2 Ma ago, due to the clockwise rotation of the eastern North Island, that stretched the land between Auckland and East Cape. The Waikato River used to flow from Karapiro, through the Hinuera Gap, and Hauraki Plains, to come out on the east coast in the Hauraki Gulf. The sediment from Oruanui eruption of Lake Taupō caused the river to change direction, and come out to the west. Rivers around Auckland, that now flow to the east, such as the rivers around Clevedon, used to flow to the west, and deposited rocks from the Coromandel Ranges in the Manukau Harbour.

== Recent basaltic volcanism of the Auckland Volcanic Province ==
The Auckland Volcanic Province comprises the Auckland, South Auckland, Ngatutura and Okete volcanic fields. Intra-plate basaltic volcanism in the Auckland region started in the south, at Okete, near Raglan in late Pliocene times (2.7-1.8 Ma), and has moved north through the Ngatutura, South Auckland and Auckland fields since then.

=== Alexandra and Okete volcanics ===
The Alexandra Volcanic Group composed of basaltic stratovolcanoes and its associated Okete Volcanics which erupted over short periods, between 1.8 and 3 Ma ago, from at least 27 tuff rings, or scoria mounds, surrounded by lava flows. The largest volcano of the Alexandra volcanics, Pirongia erupted last about 900,000 years ago. At Maungatawhiri the initial eruption was of fine-grained volcanic tuffs, thought to be comminuted by water interacting with magma, followed by strombolian activity and lava flows. North of Papanui Point violent phreatomagmatic eruptions have formed tuff rings of airfall and pyroclastic surge deposits. The Okete Volcanics include basanites, alkali olivine basalts, hawaiites, and lavas with ultramafic xenoliths. Lava flows from the Okete volcanic field generated the Bridal Veil Falls.

=== Ngatutura volcanic field ===
Activity then moved to the Ngatutura volcanic field, south of Port Waikato in early Pleistocene times (1.8-1.5 Ma). Little remains of this field.

=== South Auckland volcanic field ===
Activity then moved to the South Auckland volcanic field, in the area from Pukekawa north to Waiuku and Papakura, in mid Pleistocene times (1.5-0.5 Ma), producing over 100 eruptions. This field includes the lava flows at Hunua Falls, scoria cones that form the Bombay Hills, Pukekohe and Pukekawa, and tuff rings at Pukekohe and Onewhero. The rich soils used for market gardening in this area are the product of the Hamilton Ash tephra formation, not the weathering of the South Auckland volcanic field.

=== Auckland volcanic field ===
The Auckland volcanic field, is believed to have started around 250,000 years ago, and is still active. It covers the area from Wiri in the south, through the Auckland isthmus, to Lake Pupuke and Rangitoto Island in the north, and contains around 50 vents.

The field contains many maar craters, generated by eruptions where the magma encountered water, and a series of explosive eruptions produced a large crater, surrounded by a tuff ring. Examples include Lake Pupuke, Onepoto, Tuff Crater, Ōrākei Basin, Pukaki Lagoon, etc. Many of the craters have been breached by the sea, and are now filled with mud. The eruption of Lake Pupuke caused the Wairau River, which used to come out around Shoal Bay, to change its course to north of Milford.

Dry fire-fountaining eruptions have produced scoria cones. Examples include North Head, Mount Victoria, Mount Eden, Mount Hobson, Mount St John, One Tree Hill, Mount Roskill, Three Kings, Mount Albert, and Mount Māngere. Some produced substantial lava flows. For example, a lava flow from Mt St John flows through Sandringham, Morningside, Western Springs, and out to the Waitematā Harbour, forming Te Tokaroa Reef, which reaches within 500 m of Kauri Point, Birkenhead. Some lava flows contain caves, for example at Wiri, Three Kings, and One Tree Hill.

Rangitoto Island is the most recent volcano, erupting around 600 years ago. Apart from the summit, it is composed of Pahoehoe (smooth) and 'A'a (broken) lava flows, which are still largely bare of vegetation or soil. It also has lava caves, near the track up to the summit, that are very accessible to visitors.

While the ages of individual volcanoes in the Auckland volcanic field are somewhat uncertain, the following ages have been obtained:

- Onepoto: ~250,000 years ago.
- Pupuke: ~200,000 years ago.
- Ōrākei Basin: ~85,000 years ago.
- Puketutu, Taylors Hill, Mt Richmond, Wiri, Crater Hill: 32,000 years ago.
- Three Kings: 28,500 years ago.
- Mt Eden: 28,000 years ago.
- Māngere Mt: ~20,000 years ago.
- Mount Wellington: 10,000 years ago.
- Rangitoto Island: 600 years ago.

== Pumice deposits ==
Over the last few million years, rhyolitic pumice deposits from the centre of the North Island have been washed down into the Auckland area, and form substantial deposits around the Hauraki Plains and Manukau Harbour, Western Waitematā Harbour, and even up into the Kaipara Harbour.

== Coastal dunes ==
The Āwhitu Peninsula (the west coast from Waikato Heads up to Manukau Heads), and the coastal barriers north and south of the entry to the Kaipara Harbour, are essentially consolidated sand dunes, built up over the last few million years.

The black sand on the west coast beaches is known for its high iron content, and is "mined" north of Waikato Heads, being extracted by electromagnets. The iron comes from the undersea volcanoes, to the west of the coast, and from the Tongariro Volcanic Centre, and Taranaki.

Quartz sand to the north of Auckland, around Tawharanui and Pakiri, appears white, due to its purity.

== Geological sites of interest ==
- Rangitoto Island is a very recent volcano. Apart from the summit, it is composed of Pahoehoe (smooth) and 'A'a (broken) lava flows. Walking access to the scoria summit passes lava caves. The post eruption vegetation is a pohutukawa forest, with astelia growing on the lava, and a kidney fern grove.
- The coast on Motutapu Island from Islington Bay to Administration Bay starts with Waitemata sandstone cliffs, and finishes with greywacke and chert near Administration Bay. Ancient greywacke pebble beaches can be seen embedded in the Waitemata sandstone cliffs. It is possible to walk from Rangitoto Island to Motutapu Island via a causeway.
- Motuihe Island, a bird sanctuary, has a mixture of Waitemata sandstone, with Parnell Grit in the headlands, greywacke at the south, and a coastal section with flaggy limestone on the west coast.
- Tiritiri Matangi Island, a bird sanctuary, is a rugged island composed of greywacke.
- Waiheke Island is mostly composed of greywacke. At Stoney Batter, at the eastern end of the island are the remains of a volcano (7-8 Ma), with the remains of a lava flow in the form of large boulders.
- Lake Pupuke on the North Shore is the crater lake of one of Auckland's earliest volcanoes. Water flows underground through cracks in the lava from the lake to Thorne Bay, where it is discharged by natural springs. At the northern end of Takapuna Beach are the remains of a lava flow, that flowed over a forest, preserving moulds of the tree stumps before incinerating them. Further north along the coast on a coastal path is a mould of a large kauri tree.
- Onepoto and Tuff Crater beside the North Shore motorway are examples of explosion craters, that have been breached and are now open to the sea. Onepoto basin has largely been reclaimed and now forms a park, while Tuff Crater hosts a tidal mangrove swamp.
- Volcanic cones include Mount Eden, One Tree Hill, Mount Albert, Mount Roskill, Mount Hobson, Mount St John, Auckland Domain, Mount Māngere, North Head and Mount Wellington. Most have a large scoria cone and crater(s). The cones are often modified by the remains of a Māori pā (fortified village) including terraces and ditches built for food cultivation or as part of defence works. Te Tokaroa Reef is a lava flow that flows 10 kilometres (6.2 mi) from Mount St John to the Waitematā Harbour, and almost managed to cross the harbour.
- Many of the East Coast Bays beaches, such as Long Bay and Campbells Bay are good places to see the Waitemata sandstone and mudstone cliffs, with embedded Parnell Grit. Shakespear Park, at the end of Whangaparaoa Peninsula also illustrates these deposits well. Large blocks of basalt rock have been deposited from the Waitākere Ranges to the coast just beyond Army Bay. Further north is Waiwera, there are more Waitemata sandstone cliffs and Parnell Grit, and also hot spring geothermal activity which was commercialised.
- The Waitākere Ranges have streams which often flow down narrow gorges surrounded by conglomerate rocks formed from debris from the Waitākere volcano. The Piha Gorge, Pararaha Gorge and Karamatura Valley are examples.
- Maori Bay, just south of Muriwai, has good examples of pillow lava, colonised now by gannets.
- Te Henga Beach has large sand dunes behind it, and two lakes behind the same dunes. Further inland is native bush, including large kauri trees so the geological and biological adjacencies have resulted in this area has been used to make several TV series, including "Xena: Warrior Princess".
- Piha Beach is one of Auckland's west coast black sand (iron sand) surf beaches. The area to the south has blowholes. Whites Beach, is to the north of Piha, and to the south is Te Unuhanga-a-Rangitoto / Mercer Bay, which has a headland, with an enormous hole that has eroded up a jointed lava dike. Still further south are Karekare Beach and Whatipu Beach, backed by steep cliffs. Here sand dunes have accumulating along the shore at an amazing rate, resulting in the beach having grown almost two kilometres wider in the last 100 years. Lakes are developing behind the dunes. All the beaches have black iron sand, with the iron ore component being able to be extracted by using a magnet.
- Āwhitu Peninsula, south of the Manukau Harbour, is essentially composed of consolidated sand, more than 100 m high. The cliffs are rapidly eroding, and preserved tree stumps and blocks of peat in the cliffs fall down to the beach.
- The Hunua Ranges are an example of greywacke rock.
- The route out to Waikato Heads gives examples of the volcanoes of the South Auckland volcanic field. Closer to the river mouth, the geology changes to Murihiku terrane greywacke and this can be accessed by walking to the south from the beach. Unsealed roads south from Waikato Heads can run beside cliffs composed of Te Kuiti sandstone and limestone, and then open out to the Waikato Plains at Te Kauwhata and State Highway 1.

== See also ==
- Geology of New Zealand
