= Kiokio railway station =

Defunct railway station in New Zealand

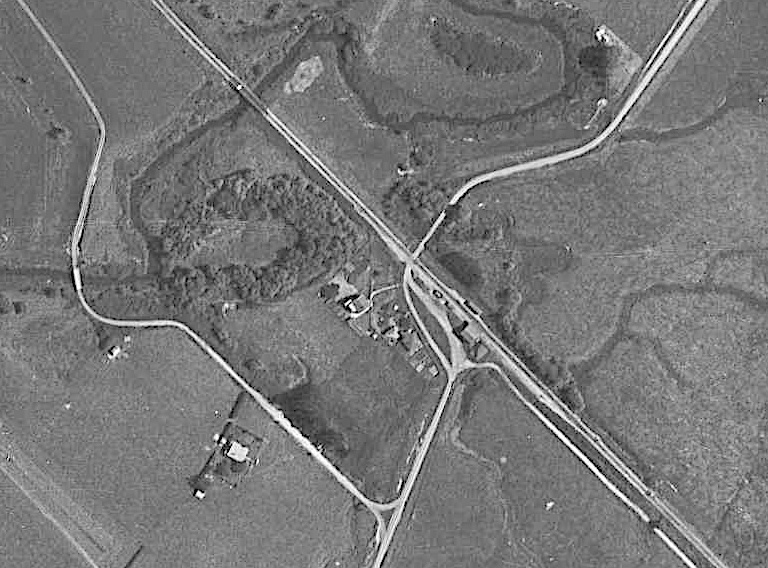
- Kiokio in 1944

General information
- Location: New Zealand
- Coordinates: 38.153255°S 175.239658°E
- Elevation: 36 m (118 ft)
- Line: North Island Main Trunk
- Distance: Wellington 498.86 km (309.98 mi)

History
- Opened: 9 March 1887
- Closed: 28 November 1971 goods, 9 June 1969 passenger
- Electrified: June 1988

Services
Preceding station	Historical railways	Following station
Te Kawa; Line open, station closed 8.02 km (4.98 mi)	North Island Main Trunk; KiwiRail	Ōtorohanga; Line open, station open 4.45 km (2.77 mi)
Location

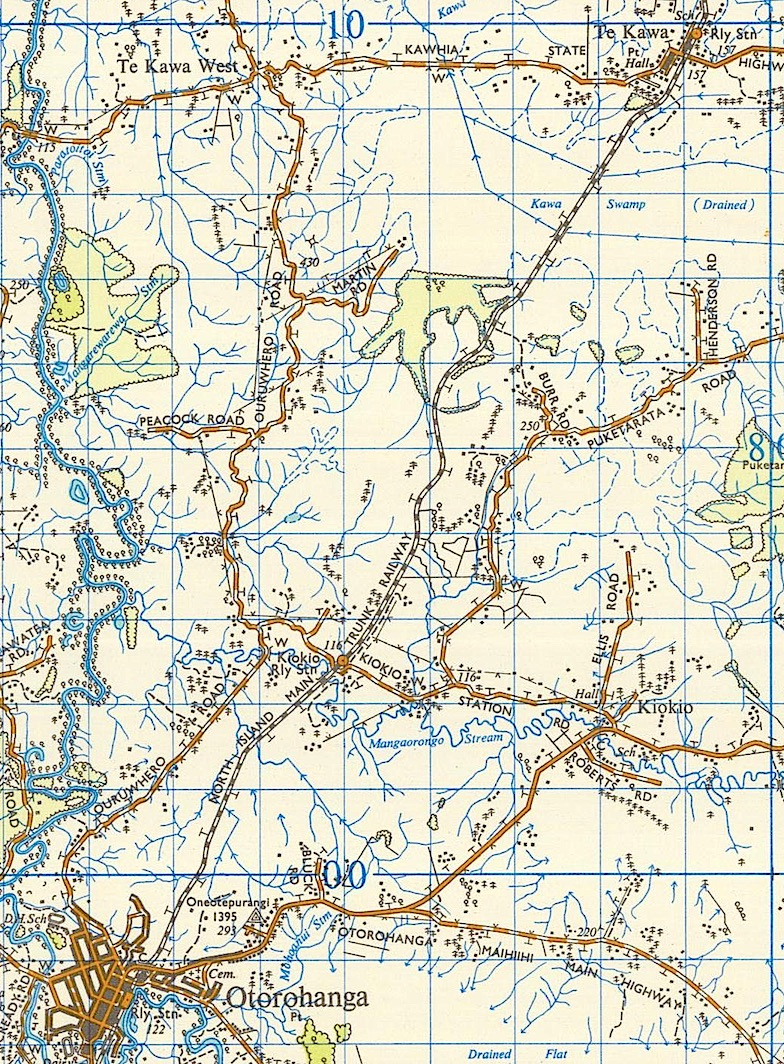
1955 one inch to one mile map

Kiokio railway station was a flag station on the North Island Main Trunk in New Zealand.

By December 1896 there was a shelter shed, platform, cart approach and a crossing loop for 4 wagons. By December 1911 a loading bank had been added and the loop extended for 7 wagons. In 1913 traffic at the station was described as, "rapidly increasing" and the Minister for Railways approved a goods shed 30 ft (9.1 m) by 20 ft (6.1 m) with a verandah over a new siding. A 1963 report said the station building was built in 1887 and last painted in 1960. It closed to passengers on Monday, 9 June 1969 and to all traffic on Sunday, 28 November 1971. There is now just a single track through the station site and, apart from the name of the road, little sign that there was ever a station.
