= Te Kawa railway station =

Defunct railway station in New Zealand

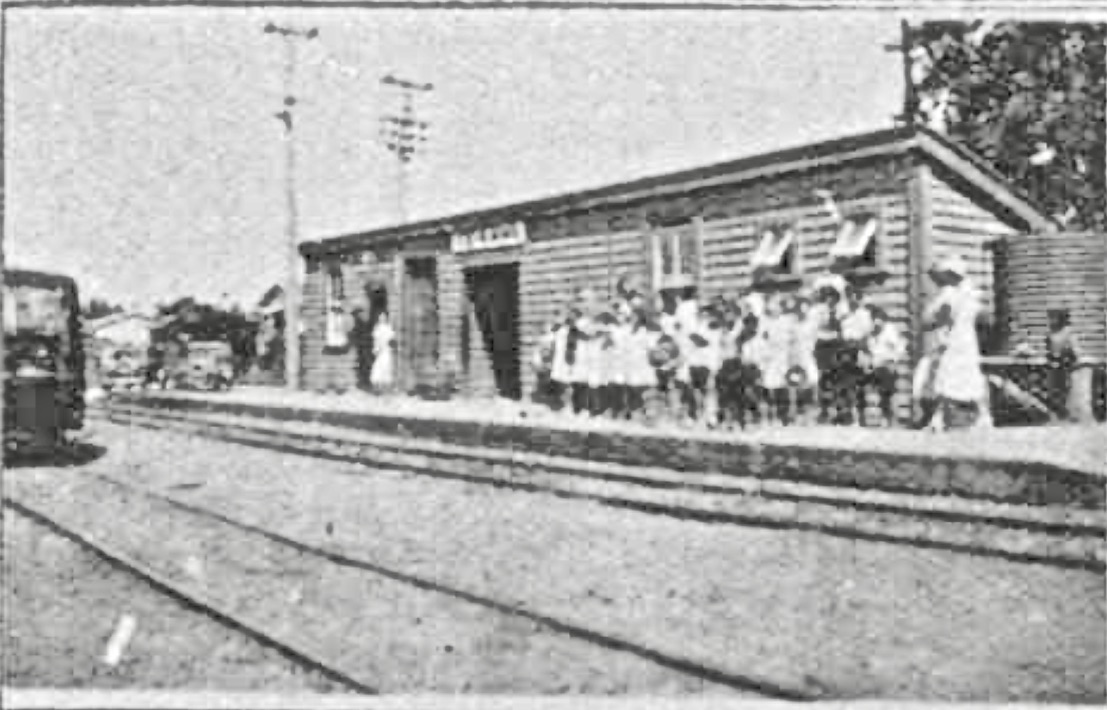
- Te Kawa railway station in 1934

General information
- Location: New Zealand
- Coordinates: 38.093093°S 175.283518°E
- Elevation: 48 m (157 ft)
- Line: North Island Main Trunk
- Distance: Wellington 506.88 km (314.96 mi)

History
- Opened: 9 March 1887
- Closed: 17 October 1971
- Electrified: June 1988
- Former names: Kawa until 13 September 1913

Services
Preceding station	Historical railways	Following station
Te Mawhai; Line open, station closed 5.98 km (3.72 mi)	North Island Main Trunk; KiwiRail	Kiokio; Line open, station closed 8.02 km (4.98 mi)
Location

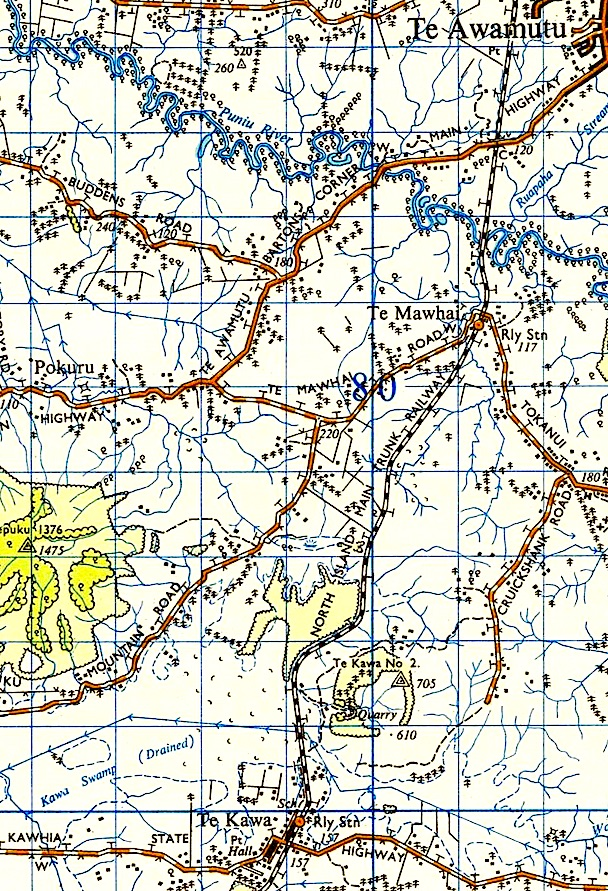
1955 one inch to one mile map (Source- Land Information New Zealand (LINZ) and licensed by LINZ for re-use under the Creative Commons Attribution 3.0 New Zealand licence)

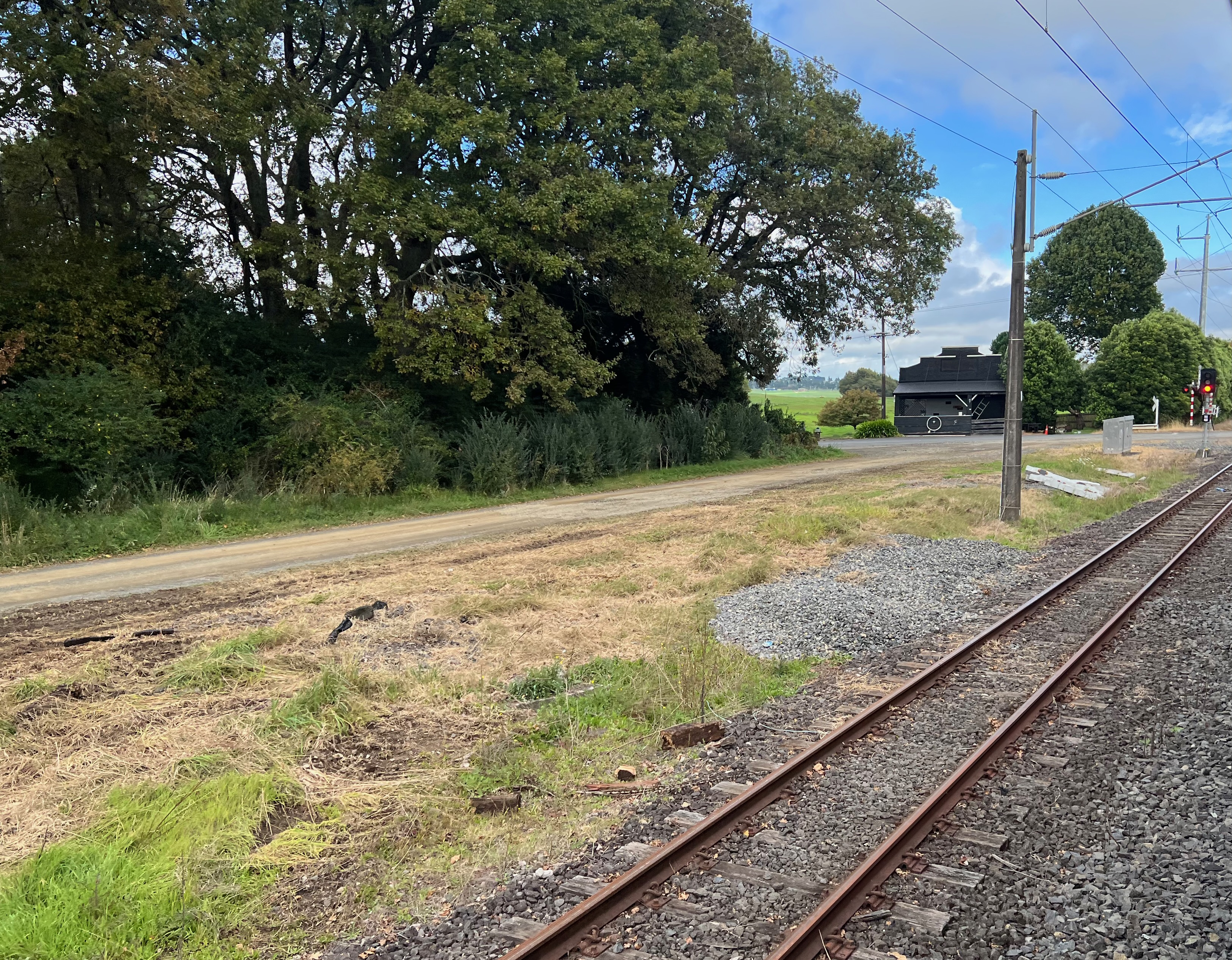
Te Kawa station site in 2023

Te Kawa railway station was a station on the North Island Main Trunk in New Zealand, located at Te Kawa.

The railway crossed 5,000 acres (2,000 ha) (or 8,000) Te Kawa Swamp to the north of the station on a 60 chains (4,000 ft; 1,200 m) embankment. Culverts were included to maintain the effectiveness of eel weirs in the swamp and provide for the flow of water. A post office was open by 1909 and a drainage board set up, which was extended in 1915, by which time the station was handling traffic for Waikeria Prison.

In 1908 the station was being considered as a junction for a line to Kawhia and Raglan and by 1920 as a junction on a railway from Kawhia to Rotorua. On 14 September 1913 the name of the station was changed from Kawa to Te Kawa. In 1917 a telephone was reported as connected, though another report put the date as 1929. By 1980 there was a passing loop for 123 wagons.

The line to the south of Te Kawa falls on a 1 in 183 gradient. There was a private siding for grain at the station in the 1970s and 80s.

The station site was sold in 2000.
