= Alexandra Volcanic Group =

Extinct volcanoes in the Waikato Region, New Zealand

Alexandra Volcanic Group (including Okete volcanic field)
- Map of selected volcanic features of the Alexandra Volcanic Group and Okete volcanic field. Legend: Clicking on the rectangle symbol on the map enlarges it, and enables mouseover of volcano feature/wikilink and ages if available in brackets. The type of basaltic volcanic eruption (some are composite over their eruptive history) is indicated by: arc basalt; ring basalt of stratovolcanoes; brown intra-arc basalt typical of those produced by monogenetic volcanic fields.; Approximate location of characterised vents are black rectangles with red centres. For wider context see map at North Island Surface Volcanism.

Highest point
- Coordinates: 37°59′35″S 174°59′0″E

Geography
- Location within North Island

Geology
- Rock age: Miocene to Pliocene(2.74–0.9 Ma)
- Mountain type: Volcanic field
- Rock type: Basalt
- Last eruption: 0.9 Ma

The Alexandra Volcanic Group (also known as Alexandra volcanic lineament or Alexandra Volcanics) is a chain of extinct calc-alkalic basaltic stratovolcanoes that were most active between 2.74 and 1.60 million years ago, with more recent activity between 1.6 and 0.9 million years ago. They extend inland from Mount Karioi near Raglan with Mount Pirongia being the largest, with Pukehoua on the eastern slopes of Pirongia, Kakepuku, Te Kawa, and Tokanui completing the definitive lineament. The associated, but usually separated geologically basaltic monogenetic Okete volcanic field (also known as the Okete Volcanic Formation or Okete Volcanics), lies mainly between Karioi and Pirongia but extends to the east and is quite scattered.

== Geology ==
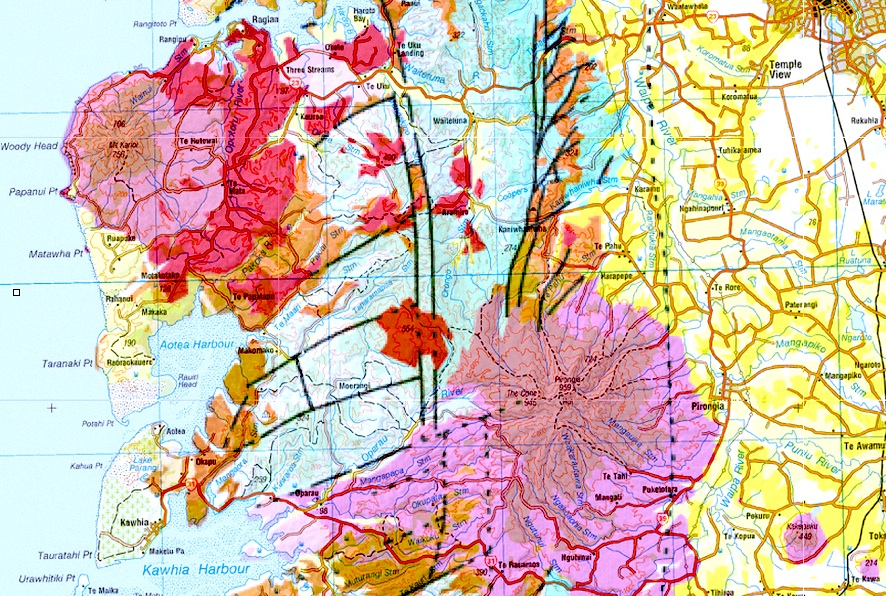
This geological map, shows some features of the eastern part of the Alexandra Volcanic Group (pink) and Okete volcanic field (red). The pink areas from the left (west) are Karioi, Pirongia (this map does not distinguish separately Pukehoua and the reference map in the article is more accurate), Kakepuku and Te Kawa

The chain extends in the Alexandra volcanic lineament, an alignment striking north-west to south-east over 60 km (37 mi) in length and is an example of backarc, intraplate basaltic volcanism that is very rare on land. This is because the arc basalts are in a very close relationship to a basaltic intraplate monogenetic volcanic field, the Okete which also erupted in late Pliocene times (2.7-1.8 million years ago). The separation of the two fields because of the different basalt composition was first proposed in 1983. The arc-type lavas of the Alexandra Volcanic Group are mainly ankaramite, a type of basalt found typically in some South Pacific Ocean islands and not within continental crust. There are at least 27 vents in the Okete volcanic field, with most being in the northwest near the eastern flanks of Karioi. Only a few sites globally have island arc basalt and intraplate ocean island basalt so associated. The first stage of activity that finished about 1.9 million years ago produced all the volcanoes of both the Alexandra volcanic lineament and the monogenetic Okete volcanic field. Karioi is the oldest at 2.48 to 2.28 ± 0.07 million years ago on unmodified chronology. Pirongia has at least six edifice-forming vents separated by features including those resulting from large volume collapse events. The second stage eruptions were confined to Pirongia. They consisted of basaltic eruptions between 1.6 and 0.9 million years ago during the period that the South Auckland volcanic field and Mangakino caldera complex were active. The arc basalt volcano remnants at Tokanui are a small mound that rises about 30 m (98 ft) within higher rolling hills of the Puketoka and Karapiro Formations. There has been much progress over the last decade in characterising Karioi, Pirongia and a separate arc basaltic centre at Pukehoua incorporated into the eastern slopes of Pirongia. The small basaltic centre at Kairangi is likely the furthest east point of the Okete volcanic field, but there is the possibility from drill sampling in the Hamilton Basin that other basaltic volcanoes exist that are subsurface now.

=== Tectonics ===
To its west, under the Tasman Sea are the even older volcanoes associated with the Northland-Mohakatino volcanic belt (Mohakatino Volcanic Arc) which are of a subduction-related origin. These include the still active Mount Taranaki at the southern end of this belt. The Taranaki Fault is between the two sets of volcanoes. To the south east are more back arc volcanoes including presently the volcanoes of the Taupō Volcanic Zone which have now been continuously active for over 2 million years. Between Karioi and Pirongia the highland terrain of the Karioi horst block is interrupted by the monogenic volcanoes of Okete volcanic field. The lineament then extends into the Hamilton Basin, a major rift-related depression bound by the Waipa Fault Zone with the arc basaltic volcanoes of Pukehoua, Kakepuku, Te Kawa, Tokanui. Kairangi is the furtherest to the east and has been dated at 2.62 ± 0.17 million years ago.

=== Relations to other volcanic activity ===
Other basaltic volcanic fields that are also now thought to represent Auckland Volcanic Province intraplate volcanism active in the Pleistocene are adjacent in a more recent to the north trend from the Alexandra Volcanic Group through to the Ngatutura volcanic field which was active between 1,830,000 and 1,540,000 years ago, the South Auckland volcanic field which erupted between 550,000 and 1,600,000 years ago, and the very recently active but presently dormant younger Auckland volcanic field. These locations fit with the trend being related to the opening of the Hauraki Rift in the Miocene and/or fracturing of the lithosphere. At the same approximate time the Alexandra Volcanic Group was initially active to its east in Zealandia the Tauranga Volcanic Centre was active.

== Details of some volcanoes ==
More age data is accessible for individual basalts/vents by enabling mouseover in the interactive map of the field in the infobox.

Volcanoes	Age (million years)	Height	Location (Coordinates)	Refs	Images
Karioi	2.92 - 2.16 Ma	756 metres (2,480 ft)	37°52′S 174°49′E		Karioi behind Raglan and Whaingaroa Harbour.
Pirongia	2.74 - 0.9 Ma	959 metres (3,146 ft)	37°59′35.19″S 175°5′52.27″E		View from the west of Mount Pirongia which is the largest volcano in the Alexandra Volcanic Group. To the left of this view are some of the vents of the Okete volcanic field. The foreground hills over the water of Aotea Harbour are non-volcanic in the Karioi horst block.
Kakepuku	2.35 - 2.70 Ma	449 metres (1,473 ft)	38°3′57.51″S 175°14′59.6358″E		Kakepuku with Te Kawa behind.
Te Kawa	2.21 Ma	214 metres (702 ft)	38°04′52″S 175°17′39″E		View towards west of Te Kawa tuff ring, Kakepuku (middle distance) and Pirongia at horizon

== See also ==
- Geology of the Auckland Region
- Geology of the Waikato Region
- List of volcanoes in New Zealand
- Volcanism in New Zealand
- Stratigraphy of New Zealand
- Auckland volcanic field
- South Auckland volcanic field
