= Te Mawhai railway station =

Defunct railway station in New Zealand

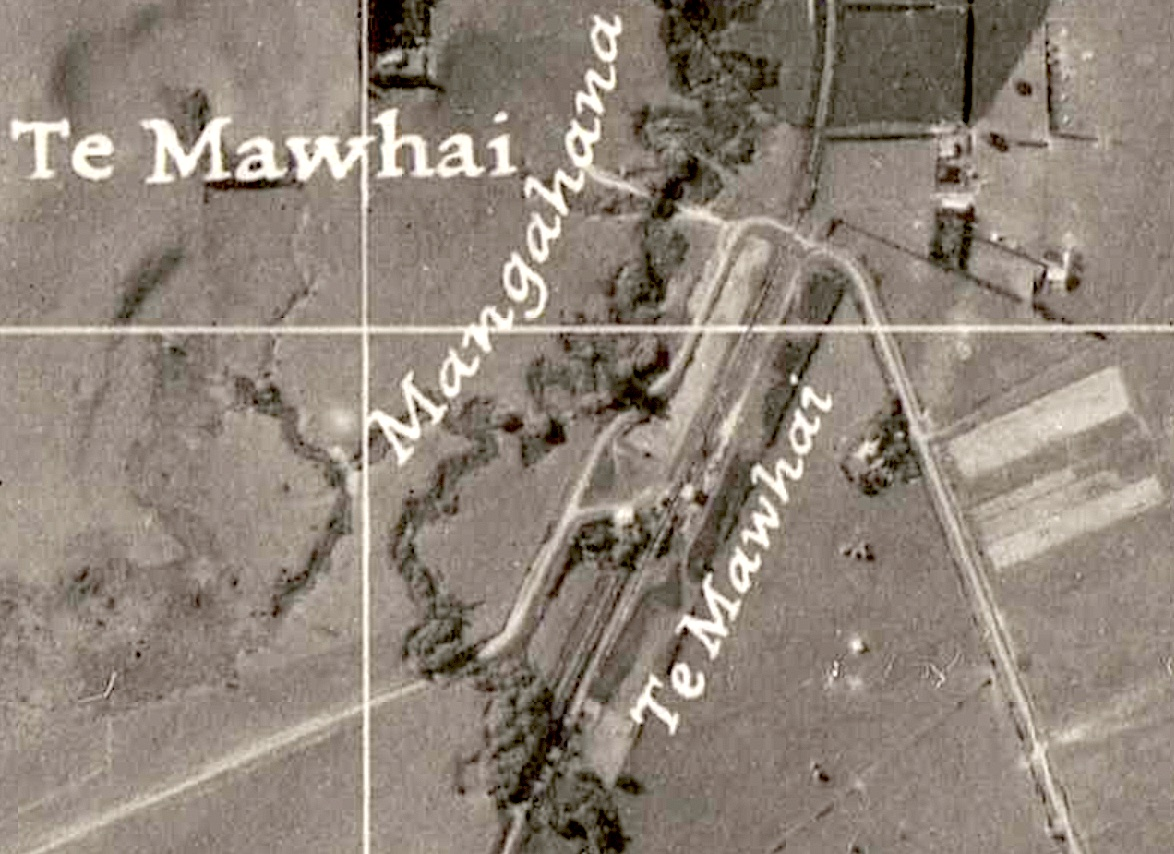
- Te Mawhai in 1949

General information
- Location: New Zealand
- Coordinates: 38.044847°S 175.305405°E
- Elevation: 36 m (118 ft)
- Line: North Island Main Trunk
- Distance: Wellington 512.86 km (318.68 mi)

History
- Opened: 9 March 1887
- Closed: 12 May 1962
- Electrified: June 1988
- Former names: Te Puhi to 10 December 1912

Services
Preceding station	Historical railways	Following station
Te Awamutu; Line open, station closed 4.16 km (2.58 mi)	North Island Main Trunk; KiwiRail	Te Kawa; Line open, station closed 5.98 km (3.72 mi)
Location

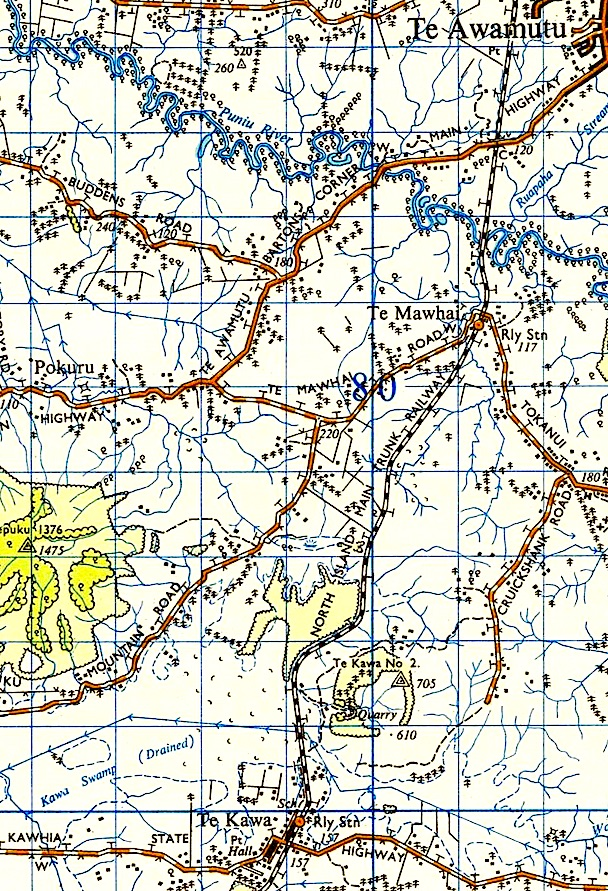
1955 one inch to one mile map (Source- Land Information New Zealand (LINZ) and licensed by LINZ for re-use under the Creative Commons Attribution 3.0 New Zealand licence)

Te Mawhai railway station was a flag station on the North Island Main Trunk in New Zealand. Its primary traffic was supplies to the nearby Tokanui Psychiatric Hospital. The hospital was situated to be convenient for freight and passengers by rail and a light railway connection to the hospital was considered.

Surveying to extend the railway from Te Awamutu to Ōtorohanga was started in 1883 by Charles Wilson Hursthouse. The first sod ceremony was performed at the Puniu River on 15 April 1885. Trains were working through to Ōtorohanga by January 1887, but the line wasn't handed over from the Public Works Department to the Railways Department until March 1887. Initially trains only ran on Tuesdays and Thursdays.

By 1896 there was a shelter shed, platform, cart approach and a passing loop for 27 wagons, extended to 38 by 1911.

In 1912 a meeting asked for a loading bank, cattle yards, caretaker and goods shed and to change the name from Te Puhi to the same as the post office, Te Mawhai. The name was changed, a goods shed was added in 1915 and improved in 1916, telephone came in 1921, urinals were added in 1922, £895 was spent on improving stock loading in 1929 and electric light came in 1933.
