= Kakepuku =

Mountain in New Zealand

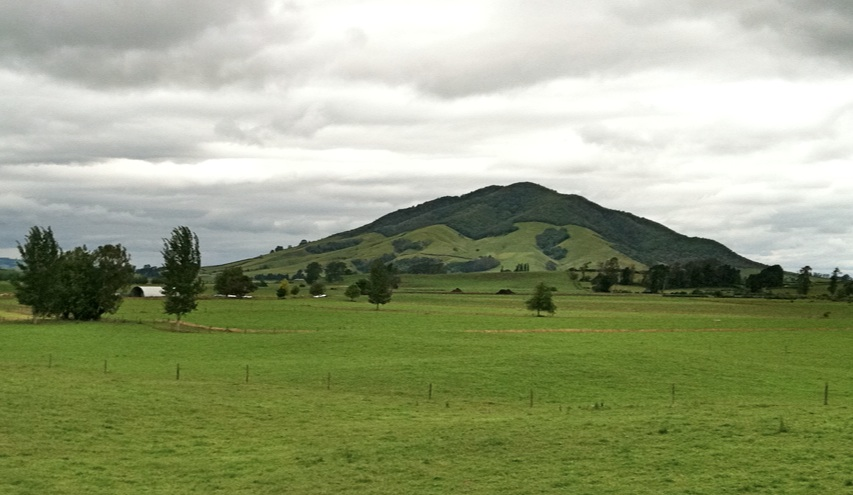
- Kakepuku from the south as seen from the North Island Main Trunk railway (Dec 2011)

Highest point
- Elevation: 449 m (1,473 ft)
- Coordinates: 38°3′57.51″S 175°14′59.6358″E

Naming
- English translation: Ascending belly of Kahurere (flying cloak or hawk)

Geography
- Kakepuku (green marker) on map of selected nearby surface volcanic features. Legend: Key for the volcanics that are shown with panning is: '"`UNIQ--templatestyles-00000003-QINU`"' basalt (shades of brown/orange); '"`UNIQ--templatestyles-00000004-QINU`"' monogenetic basalts; '"`UNIQ--templatestyles-00000005-QINU`"' undifferentiated basalts of the Tangihua Complex in Northland Allochthon; '"`UNIQ--templatestyles-00000006-QINU`"' arc basalts; '"`UNIQ--templatestyles-00000007-QINU`"' arc ring basalts; '"`UNIQ--templatestyles-00000008-QINU`"' dacite; '"`UNIQ--templatestyles-00000009-QINU`"' andesite (shades of red); '"`UNIQ--templatestyles-0000000A-QINU`"' basaltic andesite; '"`UNIQ--templatestyles-0000000B-QINU`"' rhyolite (ignimbrite is lighter shades of violet); '"`UNIQ--templatestyles-0000000C-QINU`"' plutonic; White shading is selected caldera features.; Clicking on the rectangle icon enables full window and mouse-over with volcano name/wikilink and ages before present.
- Location: North Island, New Zealand
- Topo map: BE33 Pirongia http://www.topomap.co.nz/NZTopoMap/nz53324

Geology
- Rock age: Pliocene
- Mountain type: Volcano (extinct)
- Last eruption: 2.5 million years ago

Climbing
- Easiest route: from Kakepuku Rd

Kakepuku (Te Kakepuku ō Kahu) is a volcanic cone that rises from the plain between the Waipā and Puniu rivers, about 3 km (2 mi) NW of Te Kawa and 8 km (5 mi) SW of Te Awamutu in the Waikato region of New Zealand's North Island.

== History ==
Kakepuku was named Te Kakepuku ō Kahu ('the hill over which Kahu climbed') by Kahupeka, the bereaved widow of Uenga (descendant of Hoturoa, ariki of the Tainui waka). Following Uenga's death, Kahupeka left Kāwhia and set forth with her son Rākamaomao, naming many peaks across the Waikato region. Kakepuku translates as to climb the swollen belly. In Māori pūrākau (legend), Kakepuku travelled north in search of his father, until he reached the Waipa plain and fell in love with Te Kawa, daughter of Pirongia and Taupiri Mountains. However, he had a rival in Karewa, who also stood nearby. The mountains fought, Karewa lost and, pursued by Kakepuku's rocks, fled into the Tasman Sea, now also known as Kārewa / Gannet Island. So Kakepuku remains guarding Te Kawa.

DOC says, "Tainui settlement in the Kakepuku area began about 1550AD, although there were probably earlier people's present – notably Ngati Kahupungapunga (see history of Tokoroa)." It is in the Ngāti Maniapoto area (see also http://www.teara.govt.nz/en/ngati-maniapoto/1). Four pā sites are hidden under forest or regenerating bush. The District Plan lists 40 sites of pits, terraces and pās on Kakepuku, predominantly on the north side. Ferdinand Hochstetter, who visited in 1859, said the top of the mountain was known as Hikurangi, arch of heaven.

Waipa County Council built the lookout tower in 1977.

== Geology ==
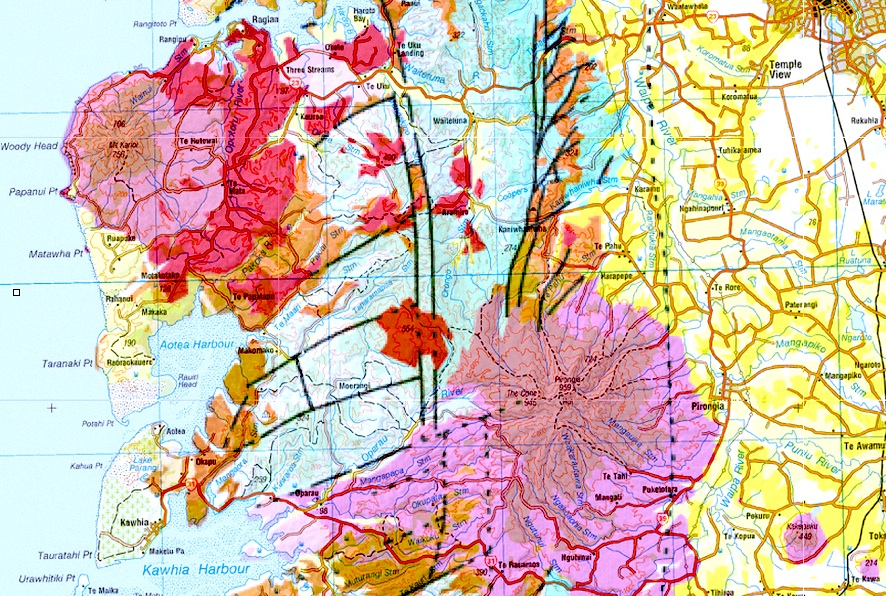
Kakepuku (2nd pink area from bottom right) is one of a line of volcanoes in the Alexandra Volcanics. This map is geologically out of date.

Kakepuku (449 m asl) is a basaltic dome volcano located at the eastern edge of the Alexandra Volcanic Group, a Plio-Pleistocene volcanic field stretching from Waikeria to the Whāingaroa-Karioi area. Alongside Te Kawa, the Kakepuku dome was constructed during two distinct stages of eruptions at 2.7 and 2.3 million years ago, with most of the dome apparently constructed during the initial eruptive phase. Most of the volcano is composed of ankaramite basalt, a rare type of lava with megacrysts of clinopyroxene that is also found on Karioi, Mount Pirongia and Te Kawa. The steep dome structure of Kakepuku is the result of the high viscosity of its ankaramite lava. The chemical composition of Kakepuku's lavas indicate an origin from the subducted Pacific slab. Aeromagnetic survey data indicates that numerous other small volcanoes lie buried beneath river sediment to the west and southwest of Kakepuku.

== Walking track ==
DOC says, "From the car park there is a new walking track to the summit. This incorporates the mountain biking track for part of the way. This track is an old farm road and is of an even gradient. The bottom 3/4 of this track is also able to be used by mountain bikers. Once at the top continue along a ridge through a fine remnant of original forest in the ancient crater and finally onto the summit itself (449 m, marked with a trig)."

== Conservation ==
Kakepuku Mountain Conservation Project covers 198 ha including Kakepuku Mountain Historic Reserve (administered by DOC), adjacent Waipa District Council reserve and private land. The project was established in 1995 out of concern for the health of native bush on Kakepuku Maunga. The aim has been to reduce possum, rat and goat populations to levels where minimal impact on forest and native birds would occur. 30 North Island robins were reintroduced in 1999 and later the New Zealand falcon, weedy portions on the fringe of the mountain were replanted with native plants and tūī and kererū are also present. Plants in the reserve include tawa, rewarewa, kohekohe, mangeao and pukatea. Kakepuku also has filmy fern and king fern. Gold-striped gecko and Auckland green gecko are also on the mountain.

== Gallery ==
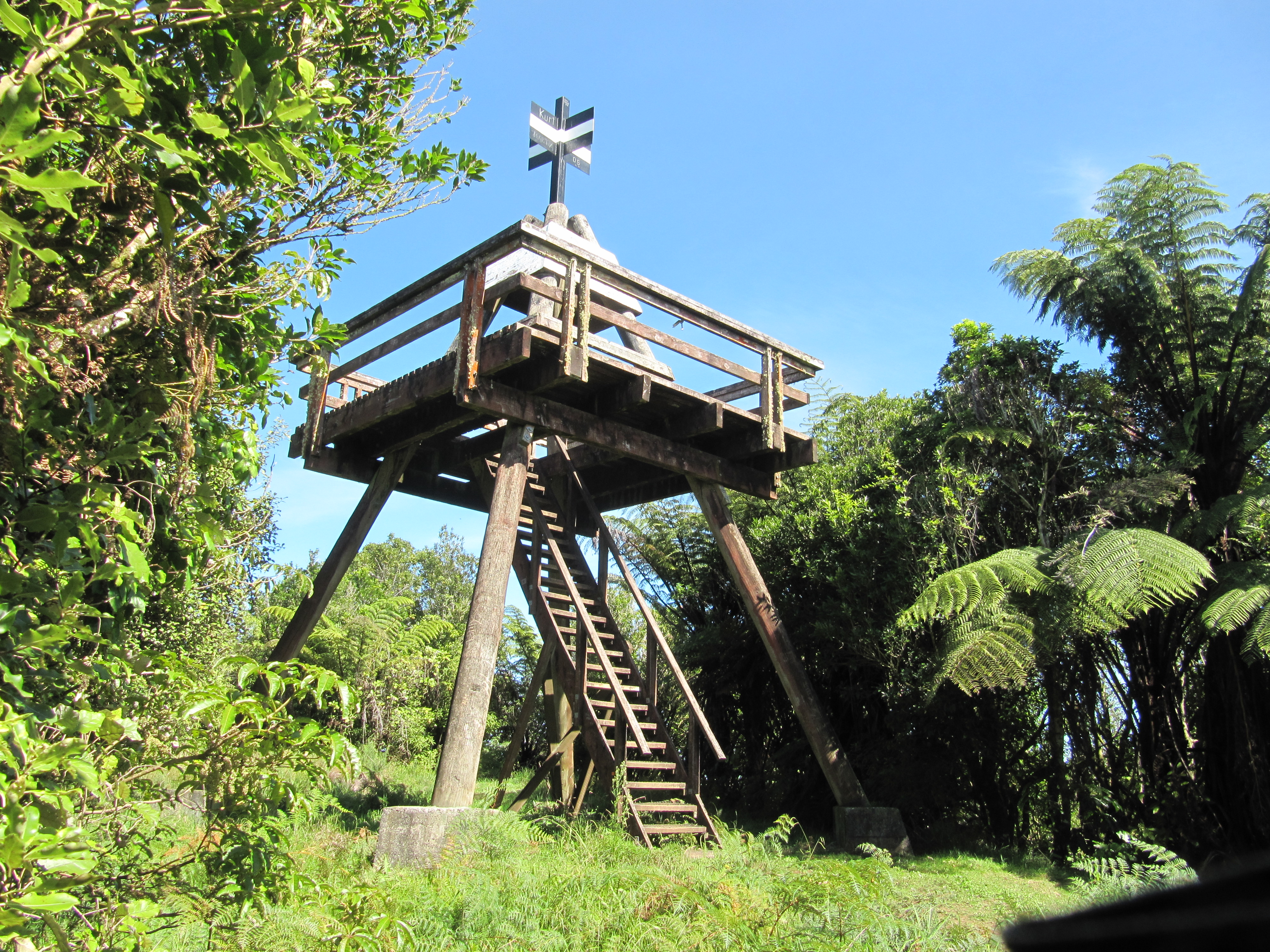
Kakepuku summit lookout tower – Pirongia, Maungatautari, Lake Ngaroto and Mount Tarawera are among the places visible from the top

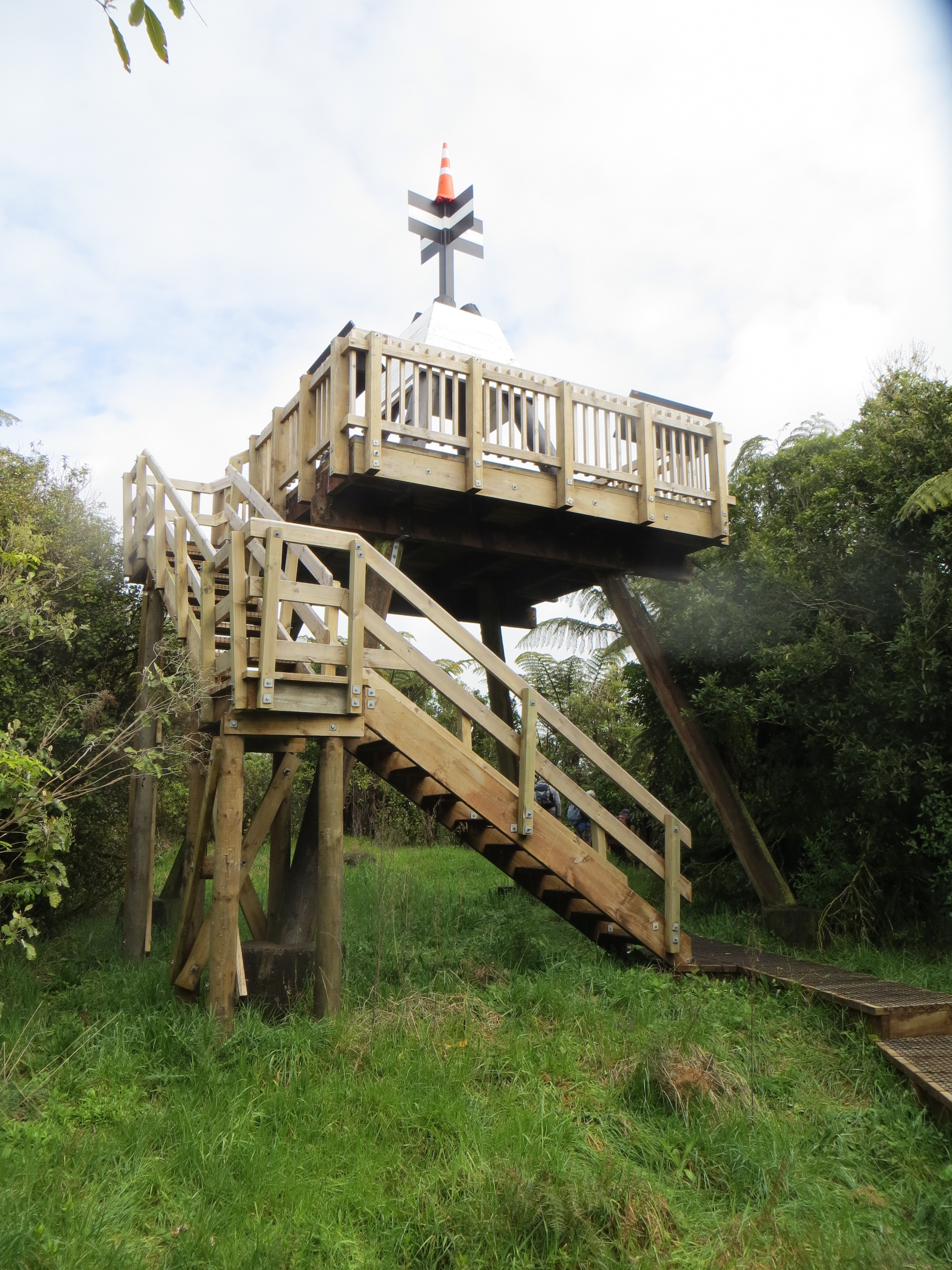
The lookout was rebuilt in 2014. It had been closed for a while due to rot.

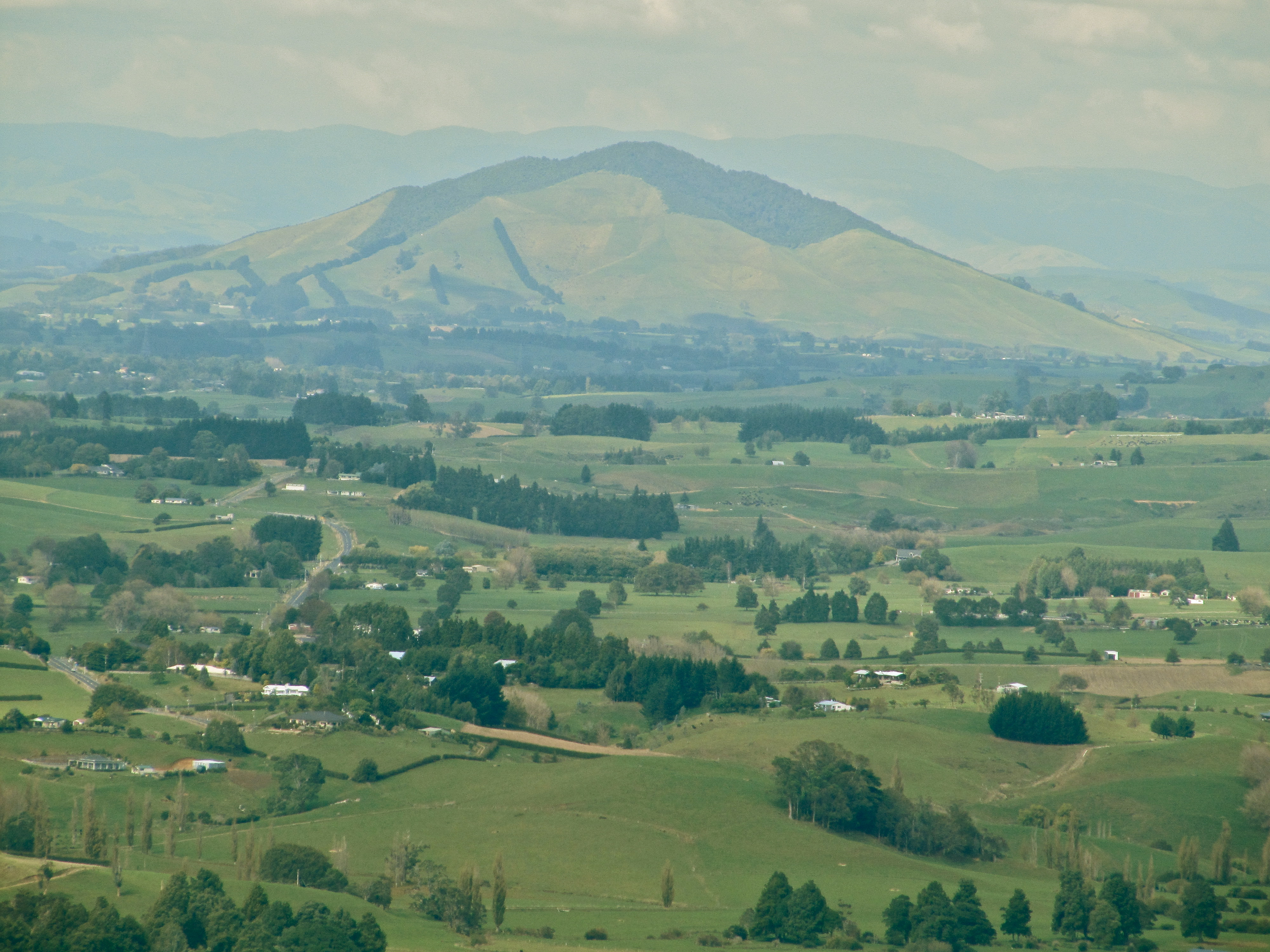
Kakepuku from the north as seen from the Karamu Walkway

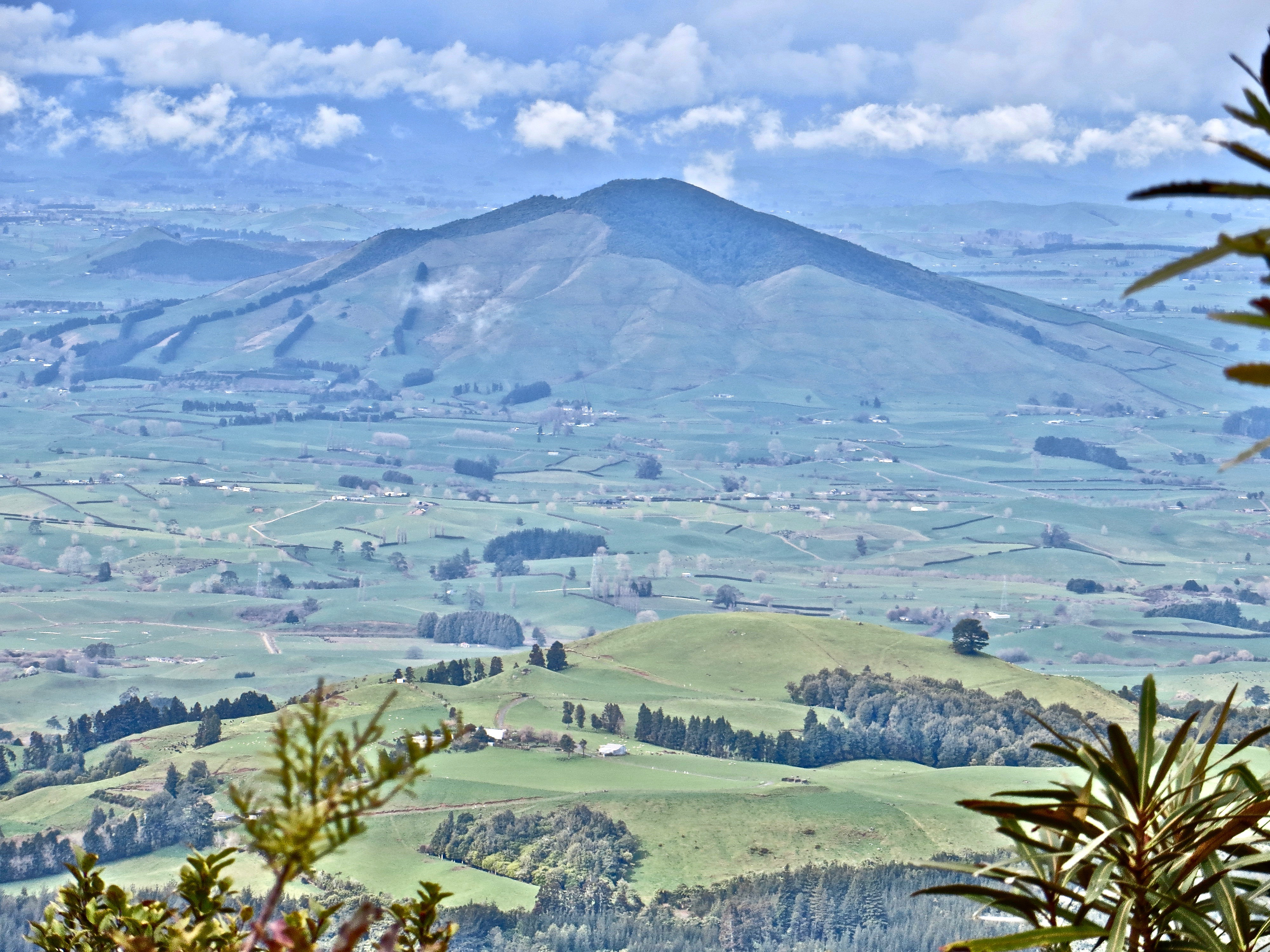
Kakepuku (449m) from the west, as seen from Wharauroa (850m), Mount Pirongia

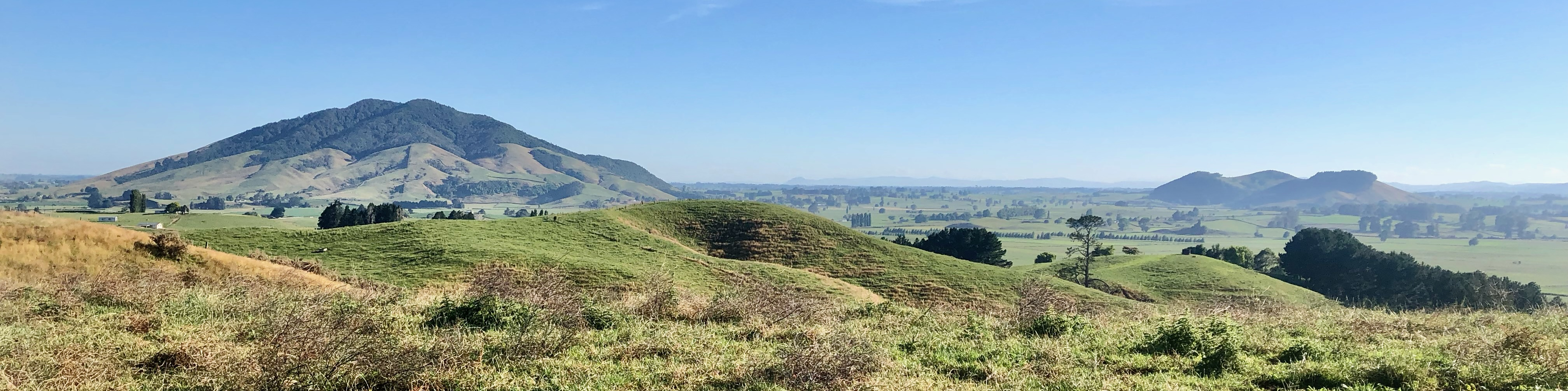
Kakepuku and Te Kawa from Ouruwhero Rd (south)

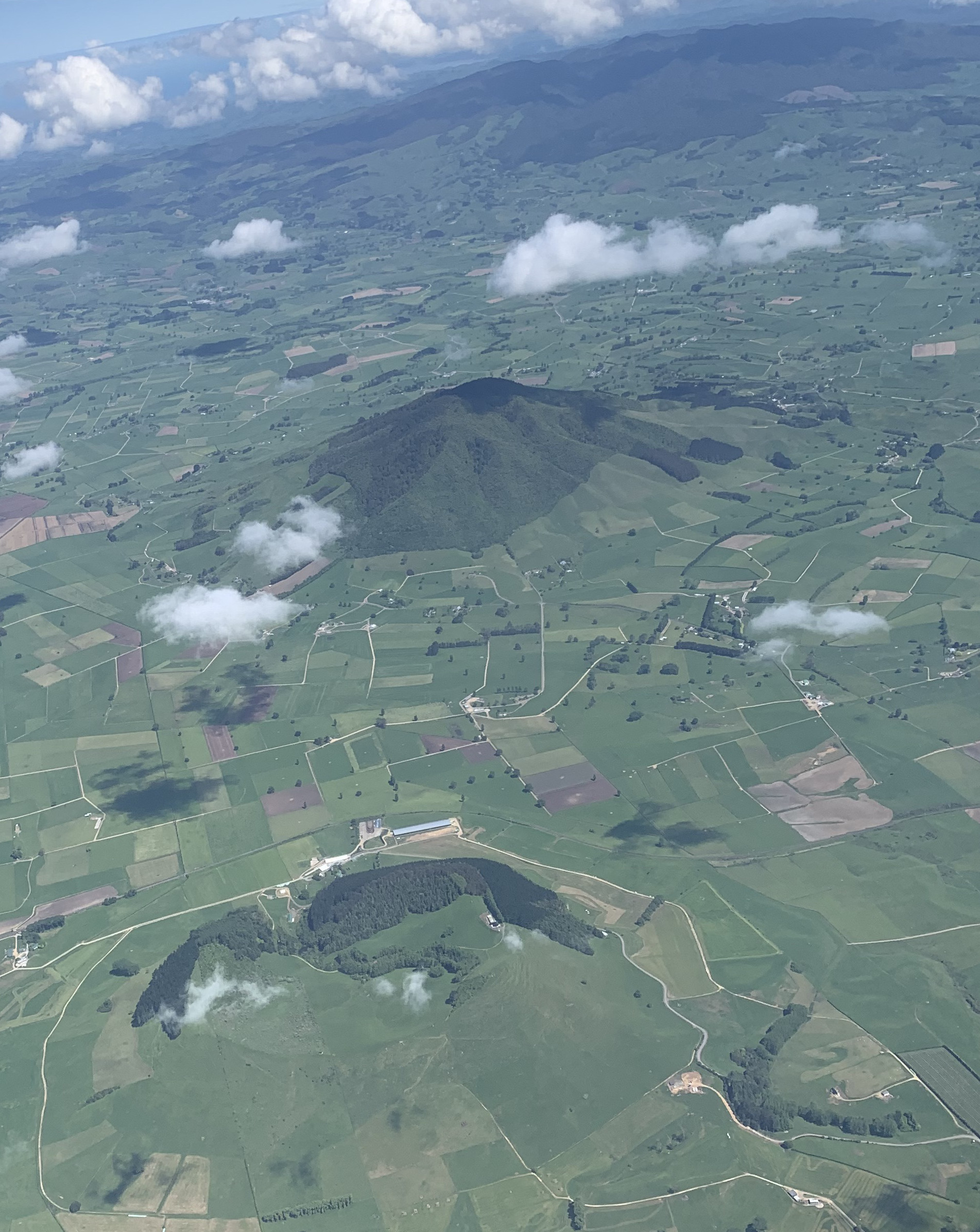
View to west of Te Kawa tuff ring (foreground), Kakepuku (middle distance) and Pirongia in distance
