= Ngatutura volcanic field =

Extinct volcanic field in Waikato district, New Zealand

Ngatutura Volcanic Field
- Approximate limits of identified basaltic surface deposits associated with Ngatutura volcanic field. For more accurate maps see the literature.

Highest point
- Coordinates: 37.54°S 174.80°E

Geography
- Map showing Ngatutura Volcanic Field, but allowing wider volcanic context. Legend: Key for the volcanics that are shown with panning is: basalt (shades of brown/orange); monogenetic basalts; undifferentiated basalts of the Tangihua Complex in Northland Allochthon; arc basalts; arc ring basalts; dacite; andesite (shades of red); basaltic andesite; rhyolite (ignimbrite is lighter shades of violet); plutonic; White shading is selected caldera features.; Clicking on the rectangle icon enables full window and mouse-over with volcano name/wikilink and ages before present.

Geology
- Rock age: Miocene (1.83–1.54 Ma)
- Mountain type: Volcanic field
- Rock type: Basalt
- Last eruption: 1.6 Ma

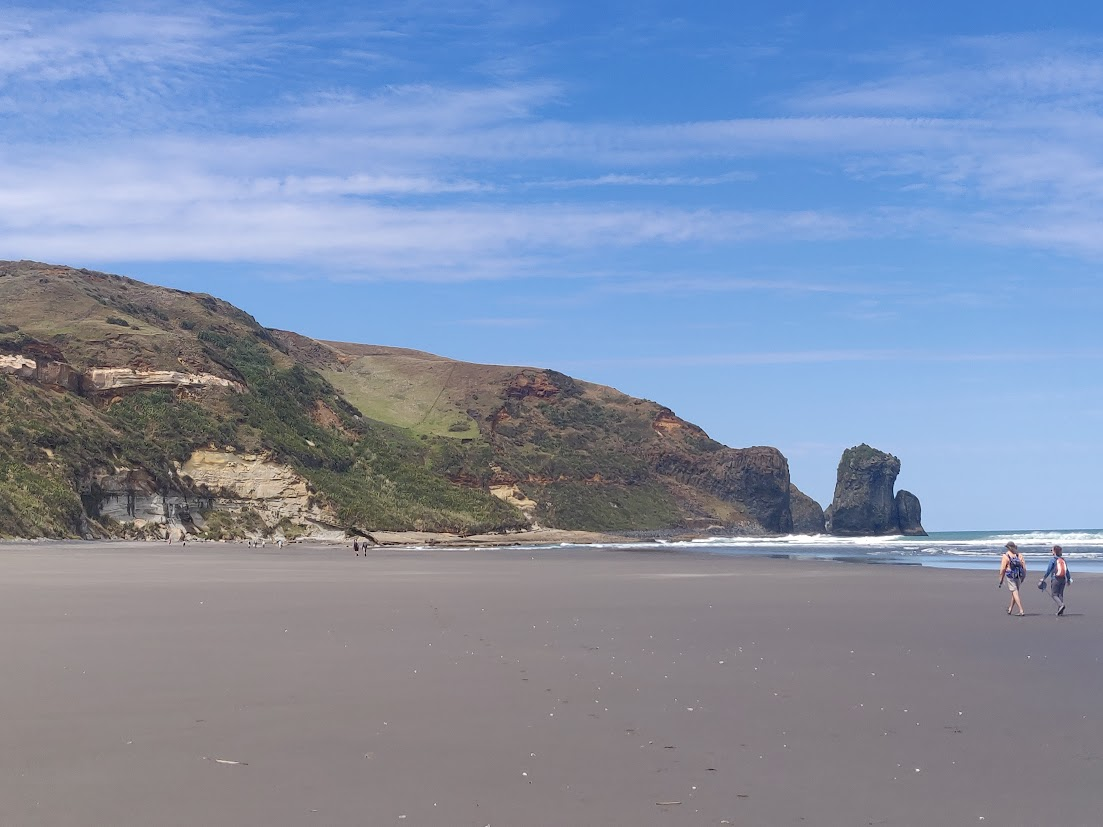
Ngatutura Point

The extinct Ngatutura volcanic field that was active between 1.54 and 1.83 million years ago is one of four volcanic fields in an intraplate back arc relationship with the still active Hauraki Rift and the presently dormant Auckland volcanic field. The other volcanic fields, which are part of the Auckland Volcanic Province, are the oldest, Okete to the south near Raglan in late Pliocene times (2.7-1.8 Ma). and to the north the younger South Auckland volcanic field.

== Geology ==
This field is smaller than the other three and has far fewer basaltic volcanic centres. However at least 16 volcanic centres, mostly scoria cones associated with lava flows of limited hawaiite to nepheline hawaiite composition are known. Some of the basalt deposits in this region of the coast are now known to be related to the West Ngatutura volcanic field with a stratigraphic age of c. 3.5 Ma around 60 km offshore. The earlier work on the field had suggested fewer centres being:

1. Initial vent
  - This was under the present sea but basaltic lava flowed to the east so is identifiable in present coastal stratigraphy.
2. Ohuka Centre
  - Likely was a low angle scoria cone associated with an extensive basaltic lava flow of about 700 ha (1,700 acres).
3. Quarry Centre
  - Two vents with limited basaltic extrusions, perhaps erupted along the Ohuka fault plane.
4. Ngatutura Complex
  - Associated with at least five major phases of activity with evidence in nearby bays along the coast. Included some violent magmatophreatic eruptions

== See also ==
- Geology of the Auckland Region
- Geology of the Waikato Region
- List of volcanoes in New Zealand
- Volcanism in New Zealand
- Stratigraphy of New Zealand
- Auckland volcanic field
- South Auckland volcanic field
- List of volcanic fields
