= Te Puke (volcano) =

Volcano in New Zealand

- Te Puke monogenetic basaltic scoria cones (red marker) and lava field. Legend: Key for the volcanics that are shown with panning is: basalt (shades of brown/orange); monogenetic basalts; undifferentiated basalts of the Tangihua Complex in Northland Allochthon; arc basalts; arc ring basalts; dacite; andesite (shades of red); basaltic andesite; rhyolite (ignimbrite is lighter shades of violet); plutonic; White shading is selected caldera features.; Clicking on the rectangle icon enables full window and mouse-over with volcano name/wikilink and ages before present.

Highest point
- Elevation: 136 m (446 ft)
- Coordinates: 35.252033°S 174.029961°E

Geology
- Rock age: Pleistocene
- Mountain type: Basaltic scoria cones
- Rock type: Basalt
- Last eruption: c. 1,300 years ago

Te Puke is a 136 metres (446 ft) high group of basaltic scoria cones, in the Kaikohe-Bay of Islands volcanic field in Northland, New Zealand. It is the easternmost volcano of the field, being located near Waitangi. The three or four small, cratered cones are in a southwest–northeast alignment. The last eruption was 1300 to 1800 years ago.
