= Karioi =

Mountain in New Zealand

Mount Karioi
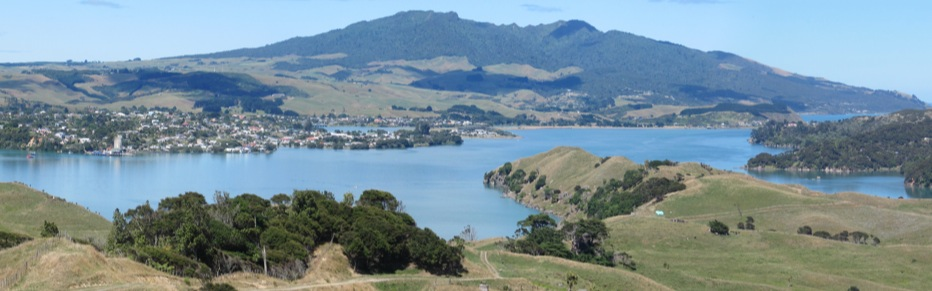
- Mt. Karioi, Raglan and Whaingaroa Harbour (February 2012)

Highest point
- Elevation: 756 m (2,480 ft)
- Coordinates: 37°52′S 174°49′E

Naming
- English translation: to loiter or idle
- Language of name: Māori

Geography
- Location within New Zealand
- Map of selected volcanic features near Karioi (green marker). Clicking on the map enlarges it, and enables mouseover of volcano feature/wikilink and ages if available in brackets. The type of basaltic volcanic eruption (some are composite over their eruptive history) is indicated by red being arc basalts, pink being ring basalts of stratovolcanoes and brown being intra-arc basalts typical of those produced by monogenetic volcanic fields. Approximate location of characterised vents are black rectangles with red centres. For wider context see map at North Island Surface Volcanism.
- Location: North Island, New Zealand
- Topo map: BD32 Raglan

Geology
- Rock age: Pliocene
- Mountain type: Stratovolcano (extinct)

Climbing
- Easiest route: from Ruapuke Rd

Karioi or Mount Karioi is a 2.4 million year old extinct stratovolcano 8 km (5.0 mi) SW of Raglan in the Waikato region of New Zealand's North Island. It was the earliest of the line of 6 calcalkalic volcanoes, the largest of which is Mount Pirongia (the others are at Kakepuku, Te Kawa, Tokanui, Waikeria and probably Puketotara). Karioi forms a background to many parts of Raglan.

Karioi was also a Highway Board area around the maunga from 1870 to 1889, when it was absorbed (with Whaingaroa Board area and formed into Karioi Riding) into Raglan County Council. In 1876, it had a population of 112 in 27 houses and in 1889 119 ratepayers, 80 of them absentees.

19th century maps, documents and reports sometimes used the spelling Karehoe.

Karioi is also a location on the Central Plateau (see article on Karioi railway station).

== History and culture ==
=== Pre-European history ===
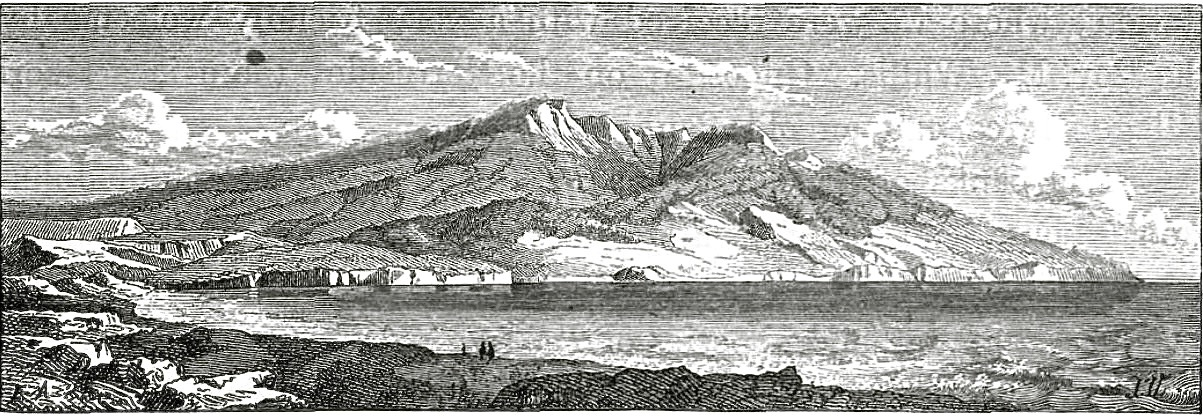
"Viewed from the Northhead, the Karioi mountain presents itself in its full beauty as a mighty corner-buttress jutting far into the sea on the Southside of the harbour. It is a trachyte-stock like Pirongia, 2372 feet high, wood-grown from foot to top, its declivities furrowed by ravines, and with a broad, serrated top." Ferdinand von Hochstetter 1867.

Many iwi whakapapa back to Karioi, which features in several Māori legends. One says that, a long time ago, Karewa was the husband of Karioi, but he flirted with her sister, Pirongia, and was cast into the sea as the offshore rock named by Captain James Cook as Gannet Island. The profile of Karioi from Raglan is likened to a 'Sleeping Lady' (Wahine Moe).

The final destination of the Tainui migratory canoe was at the Kawhia harbour. Some members of Tainui settled at the foothills at the base of Karioi. Among these was the tohunga Rakatāura / Hape, who ascended Karioi and established a tūāhupapa (sacred altar) near the peak, and gave the mountain its name.

=== European settlement ===
Raglan County Hills and Sea 1876–1976 (page 17) describes the start of European history -

“The sails of Abel Tasman's two ships were seen not long before noon on 28 December 1642. . .Tasman's own account of the incident. . . "on the 28th in the morning, at daybreak, set sail again, shaped our course east in order to ascertain whether the aforementioned land which we had seen in 40 degrees, extends still further northward or whether it falls away to eastward. At noon saw a high mountain east by north of us." This was Karioi. "First took it to be an island," . . . but afterwards saw that it was an extended coast. We were about 4 miles from shore"

. . . The date was 11 January 1770. Cook . . . wrote in his journal, "found ourselves between 2 and 3 leagues from the land which was of moderate height and cloathed with wood and verdure. At 7 o'clock steered south-by-east and afterwards saw the land lying in that direction." He did not see the harbour of Whaingaroa but could not miss Karioi Mountain. "At 9 was abreast of a point of land which rises sloaping from the sea to a considerable height. It lies in the latitude 37 degrees 43 minutes south. I named it Woody Head. South-west-a-half-west 11 miles from the head is a very small island which we named Gannet Island on account of the great number of these birds we saw upon it. At noon a high craggy point bore east-north east one and a half leagues: this point I have named Albatross Point.“

- page 61 -

“Representative Government . . . did not become effective until early in 1854. One of its first tasks was to find land for the steadily growing number of prospective settlers reaching these shores . . . The astute Donald McLean, whom Governor Grey had appointed Chief Land Purchase Commissioner in 1853, began negotiations with the west coast tribes almost immediately. In the 8 months from January to August, 1854, he arranged the purchase of more than 40,000 acres of native land in the present County area. . . On 11 April McLean paid 50 golden sovereigns as a deposit on . . . the Wharauroa Block . . . On the day following the first payment on Wharauroa, McLean handed over a similar sum in gold to "the chiefs and people of Whaingaroa" as a deposit on the Karioi Block. This area of about 12,000 acres embraced the whole of Karioi Mountain. It extended down the coast from the mouth of the Wainui Stream (just inside South Head) to the Ruapuke Stream. Here the boundary ran NE in a straight line toward Te Mata where it met the Opotoru Stream and followed it northward for about 3 miles. Thence it ran west and north to the starting point near the mouth of the harbour. A reserve of 600 acres was set apart for the former Maori owners. 18 months later, on 5 November 1855 (the day on which the last of the £575 purchase money was paid over) 65 of them, including about a dozen boys, signed the deed or affixed their marks in the presence of John Rogan and James Wallis. "These lands," read the document in part, "we have now entirely given up to Victoria the Queen of England [sic] in the broad light of this day and for ever; with its creeks, its rivers, its streams, its timber and stones."

“The price paid for the Karioi Block (which amounted to 11½d an acre) was in keeping with the Government's view of native land values in the middle '50s, particularly in this instance, when the extent of mountainous terrain was taken into account. From the heavily forested summit of Karioi Mountain, steep-sided ridges and ravines descended on both seaward and landward sides. When Rogan took over land negotiations in the Whaingaroa and Aotea districts in 1855, McLean told him: "You cannot do wrong in acquiring land at prices varying from 6d to 1/6 per acre in a part of the country that promises to become such a valuable appendage to the Crown territory."

[However, an alternative view says Karioi was given to the Crown in 1855. A Waitangi Tribunal report said the stream of complaints after the sale indicated that the Crown hadn't done the required consultation].

page 127 -

“The first block in the county, opened in 1878, for settlement under the [Homestead] scheme, was in the Karioi district. It was soon taken up, and the council, quick to see the advantages of bringing in more people, urged the Waste Lands Board to make other blocks available. . . The Waste Lands Board was also asked to provide the means to make roads to the Homestead selections and, by 1883, this work was under way. The system did much to open up the district”.

- page 177 -

“after the war, the two Jackson brothers . . . bulldozed out a road. With Mr J. Forbes of Whale Bay, as overseer, and two Maori men and a staunch Maori woman as labourers, they contracted to do work on the road for the county council. By mid-1953 the [Whaanga] road was almost completed, though metalling was not done for 2 years.”

Although the on-line history of the summit trig mark only dates back to 1995, it was first surveyed by Laurence Cussen, probably not long after 1876.

Many timber mills were set up around Karioi e.g. page 230 “The Raglan Sawmilling Co, a public concern, was formed in 1919 to mill timber on Mt Karioi, said to contain on its eastern slopes some of the finest stands of rimu in the country . . . In 1928, a fire swept through Te Hutewai, the flames destroying vegetation — and a sawmill — along the entire strip of land between Ruapuke and Raglan. The aftermath of charred stumps and blackened earth may well have symbolised the death of the timber industry in Raglan. The last mills — at Karioi . . . closed in the late 1930s”.

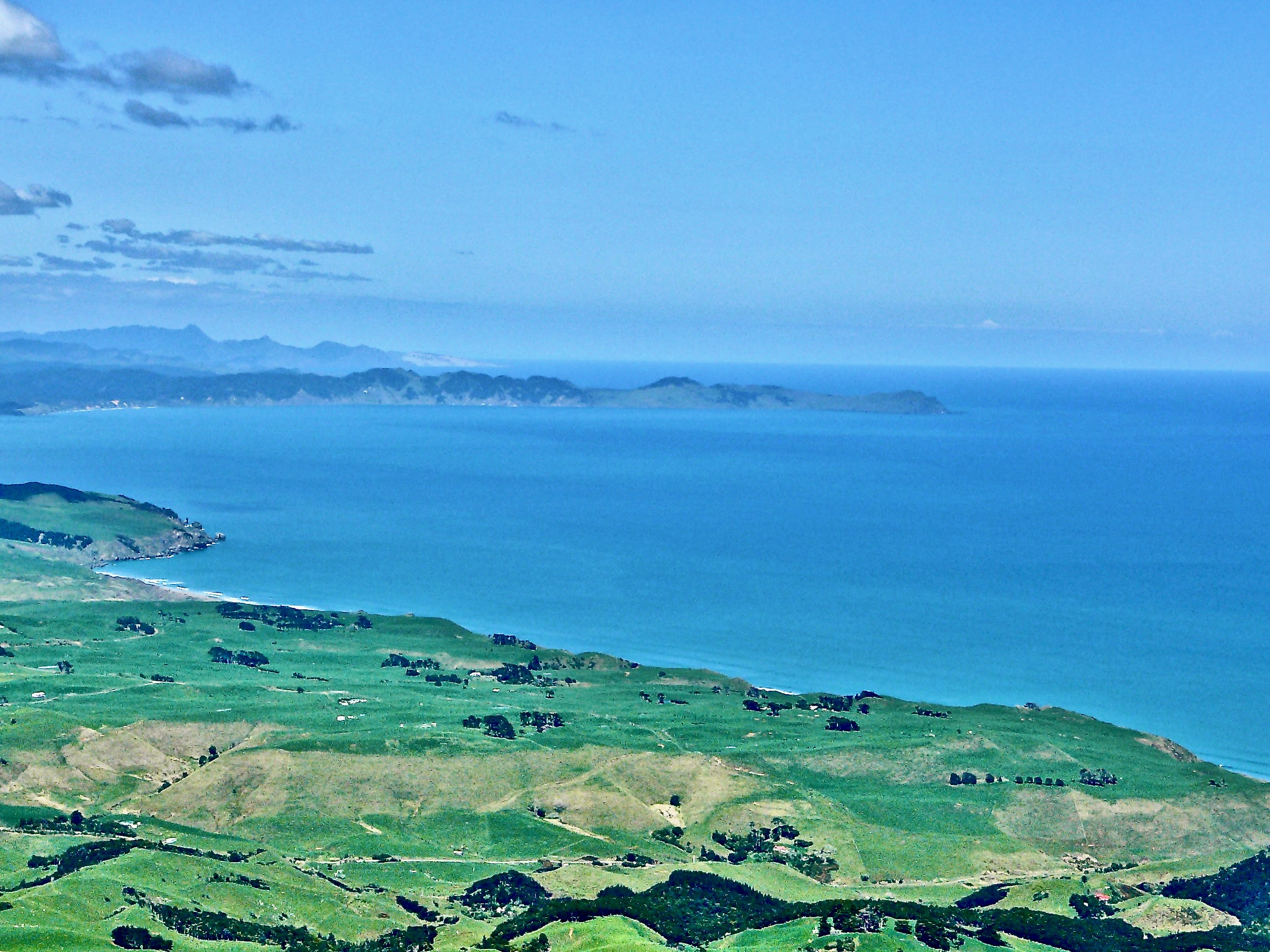
The view south from Karioi summit, to Ruapuke, Taranaki Point on the left, Albatross Point (Honipaka), the Herangi Range and Mount Taranaki

The route of Whaanga Rd, around the coast side of Karioi, was first considered for a road in 1886. It was bulldozed through in 1953.

=== Modern history ===
Karioi has been administered by the Department of Conservation (DOC) as part of Pirongia Forest Park since it took over from the Forest Service in 1987.

=== Marae ===
The nearest marae to Mt. Karioi is Poihākena, of Tainui a Whiro, on the edge of Raglan. About the same distance to the south is Mōtakotako marae of Ngāti Whakamarurangi.

Tirohia Marae on the central plateau is a traditional meeting ground of the Ngāti Rangi hapū of Ngāti Hīoi. Their marae is situated in Karioi near Ohakune, not Raglan.

== Geology ==
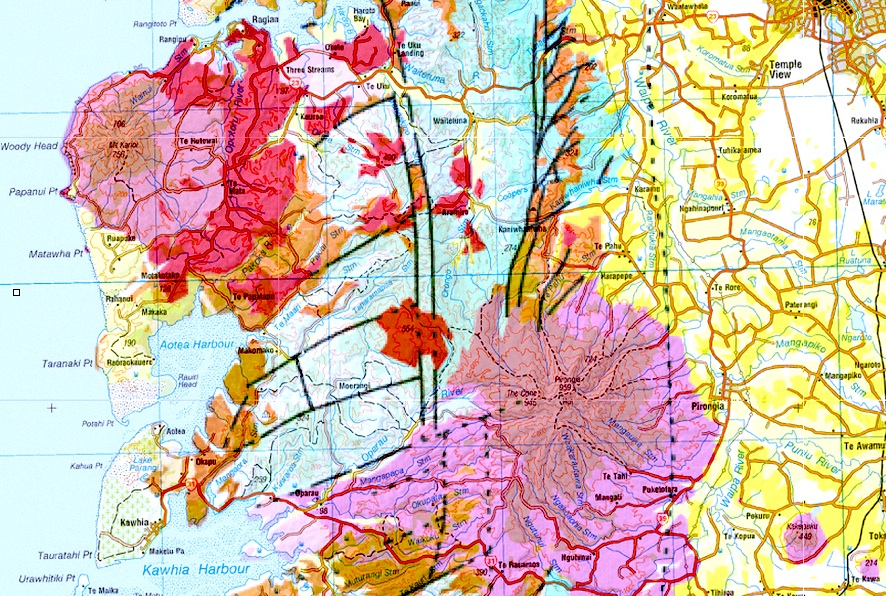
Geology map of Karioi, Pirongia, Kakepuku and Te Kawa. The surface volcanics are more accurate on the other map on this page.

Karioi is an extinct late Pliocene, low angle cone or shield volcano of the Alexandra Volcanic Group but complicated as its flanks are host to some of the volcanoes of a co-located monogenic basaltic volcanic field, the Okete volcanic field. It is the oldest and westernmost of the Alexandra lineament of volcanoes. Two million years ago Karioi was probably an ash cone, maybe double and at least 100 m (330 ft) higher than the present 756 m (2,480 ft). The eruptions occurred 2.6 to 2.3 million years ago. It consists largely of basalt with andesite dikes, which mainly form the ridges. They pushed their way through the older limestones, mudstones, etc.. The main chemicals are silica (47-60%) and alumina (12-20%)

== Te Toto Gorge ==
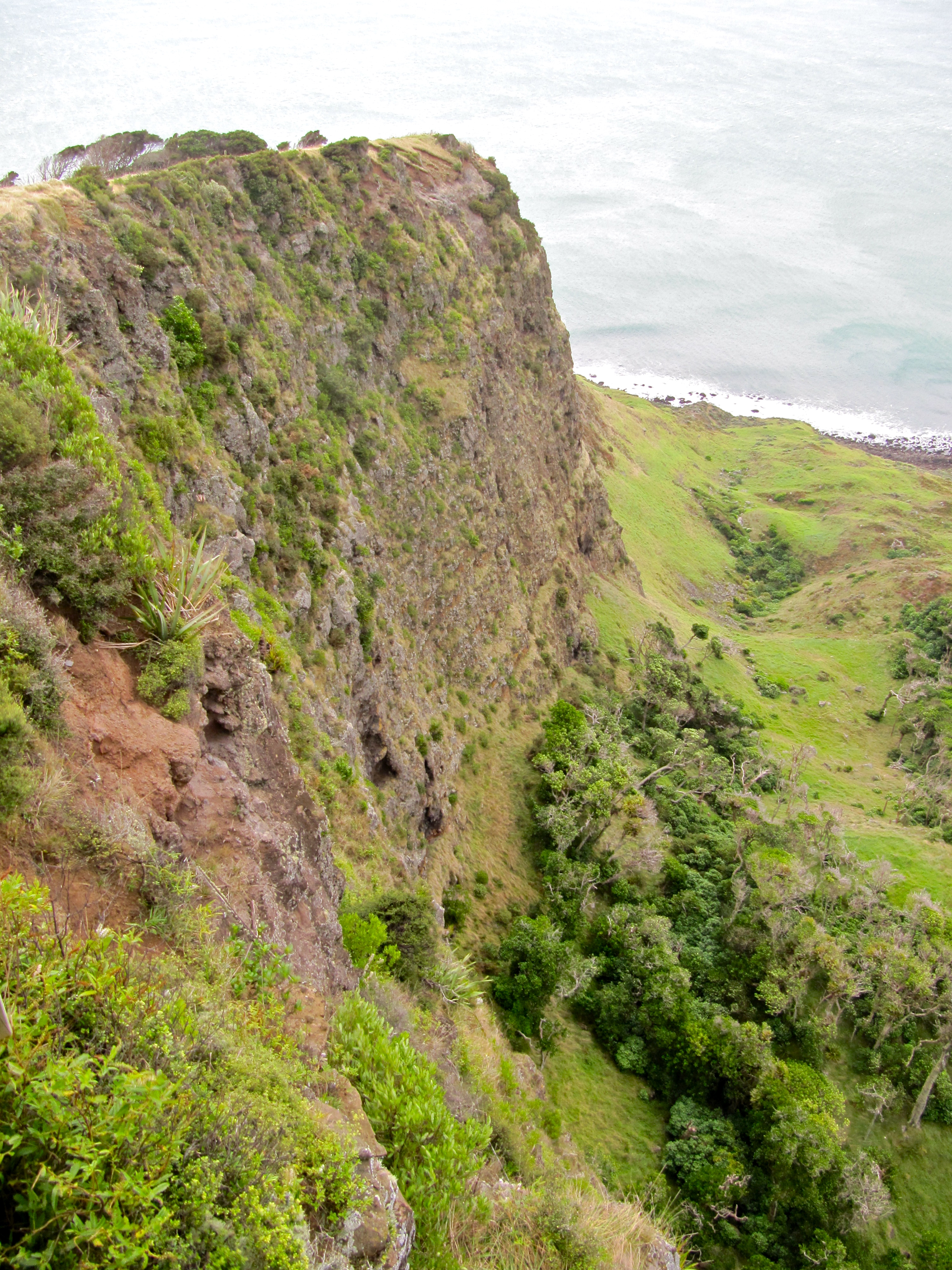
Te Toto Gorge from lookout platform

Fifteen lava flows make up the 150 m (490 ft) cliffs of the Gorge showing many large augite crystals (phenocrysts) up to 15 mm (0.59 in). Columnar basalt rests on lapilli tuffs. The coastal terrace, above the boulder beach, has remnants of the contact between the early volcanic cones of Karioi and a shallow sea margin, with shells and carbonised logs exposed. Mainly on the north side of the gorge are remnants of Māori stone gardens. There is a steep unmarked track into the Gorge off the road to Raglan a few metres from the car park. A route also exists around the foot of the cliff south from the Gorge, though it is not publicised due to a rock fall risk.

The threatened plants Veronica speciosa (syn. Hebe speciosa) and Cook's scurvy grass have been reintroduced to Te Toto Gorge.

== Vegetation ==
Captain Cook named Karioi as Woody Head. The mountain is the only area on the west coast between Mt Pirongia and Te Raupua of sufficient altitude to support a montane flora. It is sustained by annual rainfall of over 1.5 m (4 ft 11 in).

Whaingaroa's native vegetation used to consist of podocarp rainforest dominated by tōtara, mataī, rimu, kahikatea, rātā, black maire and tree ferns. In most of Whaingaroa it was largely cleared by felling and burning in the early 20th century, but remains on Karioi. Since the 1960s possums have killed many of the larger trees which had survived logging until the 1970s, their stark trunks remaining above the secondary growth.

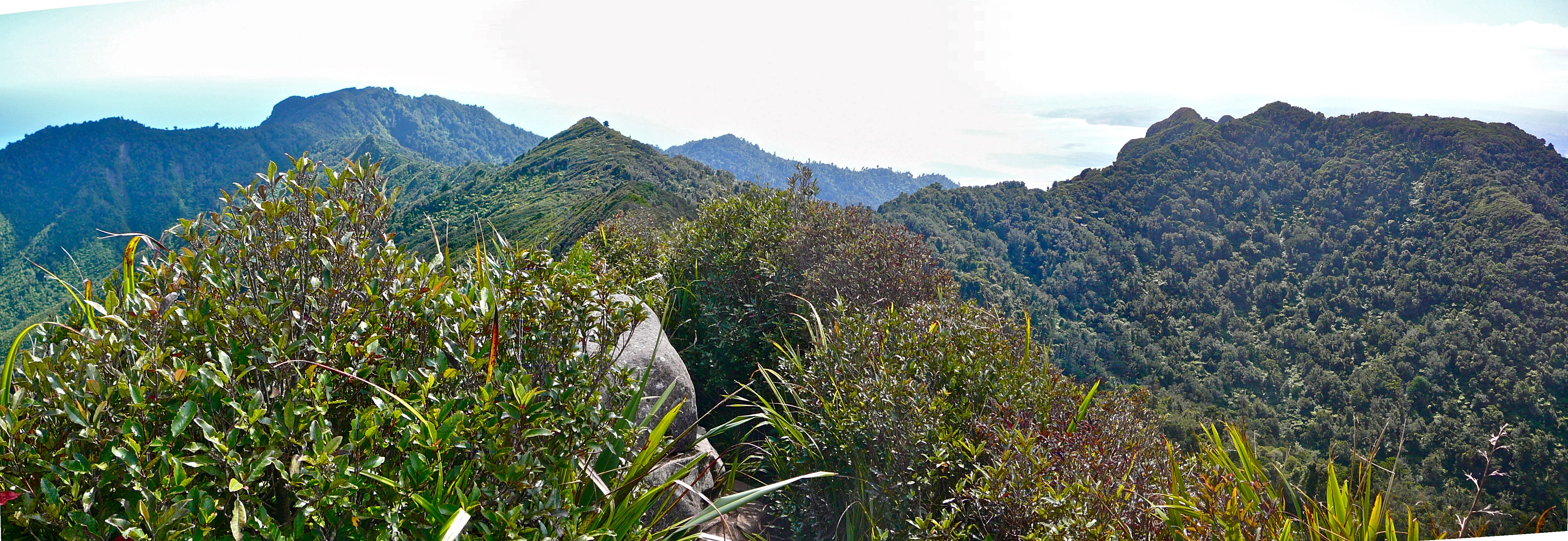
Karioi ridges from the summit

Altitude and wind are the main influences on Karioi's plants. Along the main track the forest changes from kohekohe near Te Toto Gorge to tawa forest, to kāmahi and tāwheowheo towards the top, with a sequence of māhoe and rewarewa between the kohekohe and kamahi on the Ruapuke Road side. Other species of note include miro, toro, horopito and neinei.

Despite damage, distinct plant communities (tree fern, ridge, lowland, valley floor, boulder slope, coastal and montane exposed and sheltered) remain. The Botanical Society identified 127 indigenous species from forest above 300 m (980 ft) and 264 below that level, including chain fern, spring clubmoss (puakarimu), star fern, hen & chickens fern, hanging spleenwort, crown fern, thread fern, miniature tree fern (Blechnum fraseri), silver fern, mamaku, soft tree fern, golden tree fern, rough tree fern, strap fern, water fern, filmy fern, mangemange, ring fern, fragrant fern, shield fern, bracken, titipo, climbing shield fern, kidney fern, titoki, karapapa, makomako, rangiora, bindweed, putaputawētā, clematis, twiggy coprosma, karaka, prickly mingimingi, grass tree, hīnau, parataniwha, hangehange, kapuka, puka vine, hebe, pigeonwood, poroporo, kowhai, aka, perching lily, Easter orchid, blueberry, tree daisy, jasmine vine, kiekie, lemonwood, rice grasses, pepper tree, supplejack, gloxinia and hook grass. 201 species of plants have been recorded along the Karioi track and 130 by the Wairake track and there are also mosses and fungi.

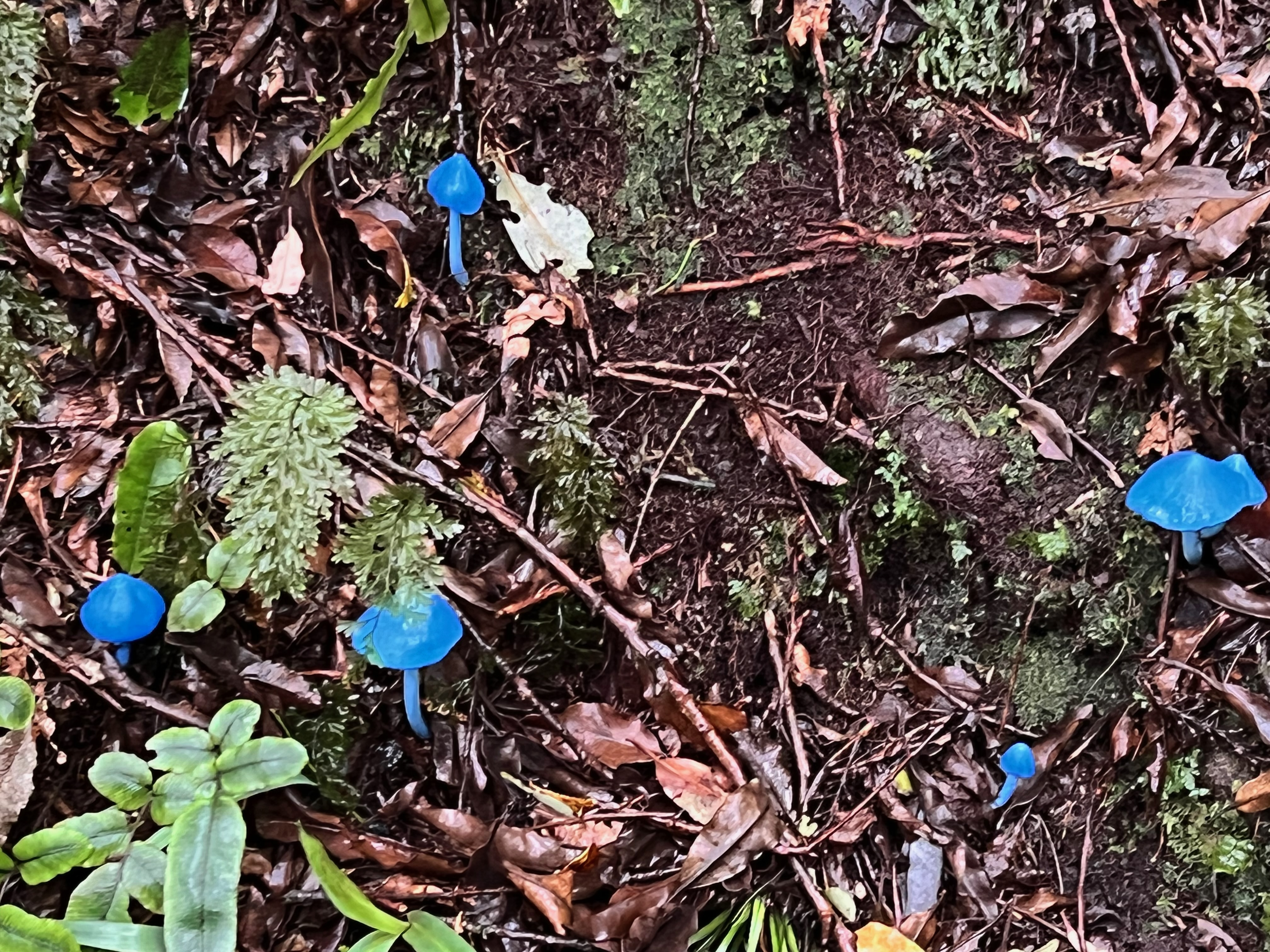
Werewere-kōkako (Entoloma hochstetteri) beside the Wairake Track

In autumn parts of Karioi are rich in fungi, including blue mushroom, red wax gill, Jews ear and many bracket fungi.

Altitude affects many of Karioi's plants. Between 550–650 m (1,800–2,130 ft), the regular mist line, many species have either their upper or lower limit. The change occurs within 20 to 30 m (66 to 98 ft) and higher on ridges than in valleys. Mosses increase where growth is affected by cloud, leaf temperature, and transpiration. Nutrient uptake is hampered and the trees are stunted and gnarled. Kāmahi is typical; its monopodial (single trunk) form changes to sympodial (low, gnarled with root-stocks supporting up to a dozen trunks) at higher altitudes. Cold air drainage on valley floors creates some of the conditions occurring in montane areas e.g., high relative humidity, low evaporative demand, and less sun.

Wind, in the form of prevailing salt-laden sou’westers off the sea, significantly affects what grows where. Species uncommon near the coast include tawa, northern rātā, and rimu. Kiekie thrives in dense tangles in exposed positions and pūriri and nīkau palm are more common on the sea side. Tawa and rewarewa are more common on ridges. Although rātā vines use a wide variety of hosts, pukatea is the most common. Pukatea grow mainly in valley floors, as do rātā.

== Birds ==
Since 2000 ground cover on Karioi has improved and tūī, bellbird and pigeon are more prolific. Kākā are sometimes seen. The regeneration of bush on Māori land around Karioi may account, in part, for the increase in birdlife. Shining cuckoos, grey warblers, tomtits and fantails can also often be heard and pest trapping near the cliffs aims to protect grey faced petrel burrows.

== Bats (pekapeka-tou-rao) ==
The high pitched squeaks of long tailed bats have been detected around Karioi.

== Lizards (moko) ==
Three species of native geckos have been seen on Karioi. Auckland green geckos (see also nautilus) were common on Karioi before possums arrived. Although brightly coloured and active during the day, they are very well camouflaged and hard to spot in the manuka and kanuka where they mainly live. forest geckos and Pacific geckos are usually on the ground and active at night.

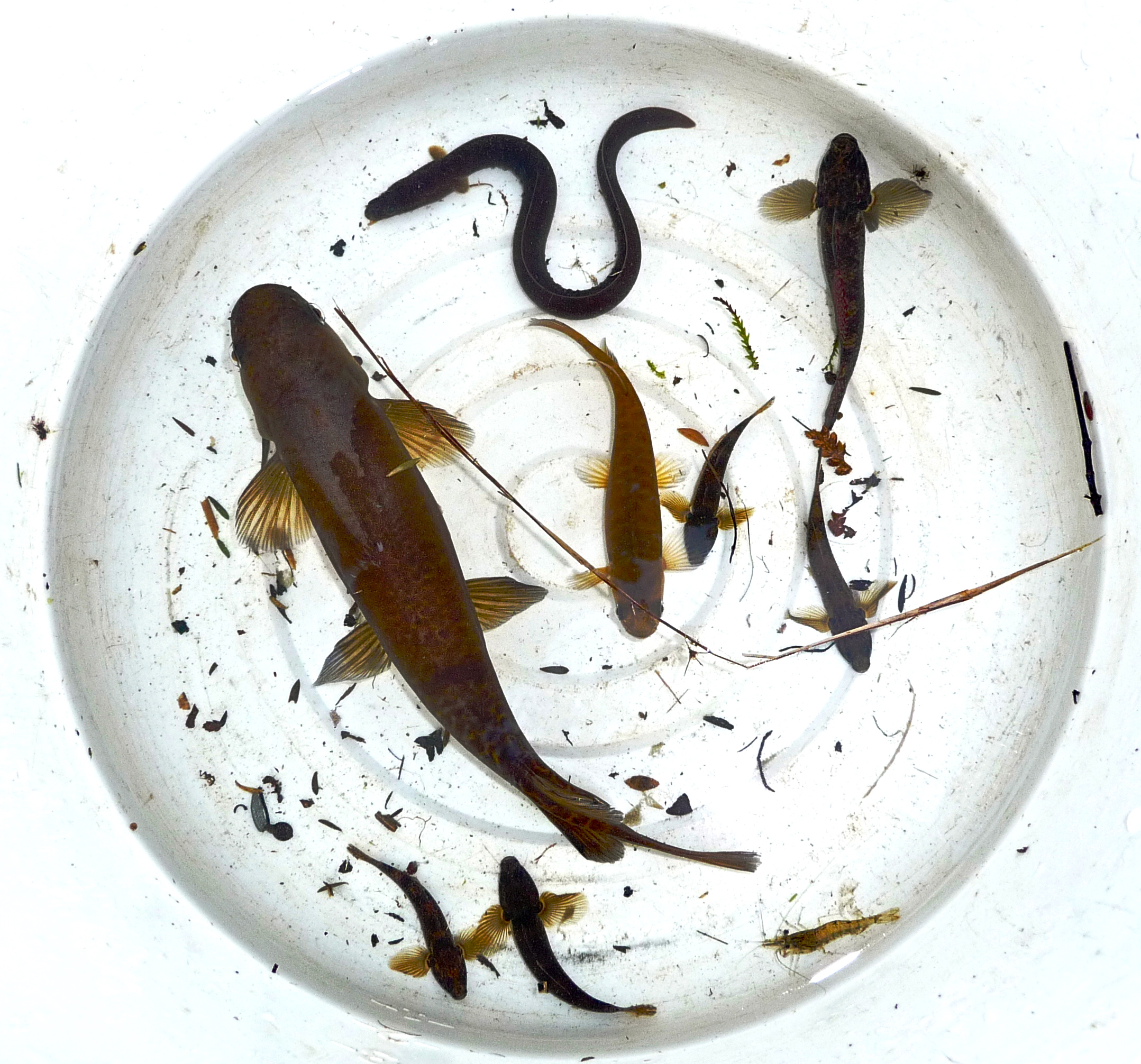
Karioi streams are clean enough to support fish such as these kokopu from Wainui Stream

== Pest control ==
Even by the 1950s damage was obvious enough for a tourist guidebook to say, "Wild goats are doing considerable damage to the native flora." Since a low point in the 1970s, DoC has done a lot to restore Karioi by periodically reducing numbers of introduced animals through eradication programmes. The aim is to assist native flora and fauna populations. Many tree species were threatened by a high goat population, such that saplings could only survive by growing on other trees as epiphytes above goat browsing level. Many New Zealand trees are well suited to this form of regeneration, as they drop aerial roots to the ground. Radio tagged 'Judas goats' have failed to locate any others.

However, just as the trees threatened by goats were saved, other species came under threat from possums. Northern rātā, tree daisy, kohekohe and kāmahi trees are favourite foods of possums and many were killed by browsing. Most areas of bush have possum bait stations (linked by pink-waymarked tracks). They didn't achieve residual trap catch rates (RTC) below 5%, so most of Karioi now has aerial drops of 1080 poison at about 5 yearly intervals. The 2010 drop achieved a 1.06% RTC. By 2016 the level had risen to 10%, prompting another 1080 application in 2017.

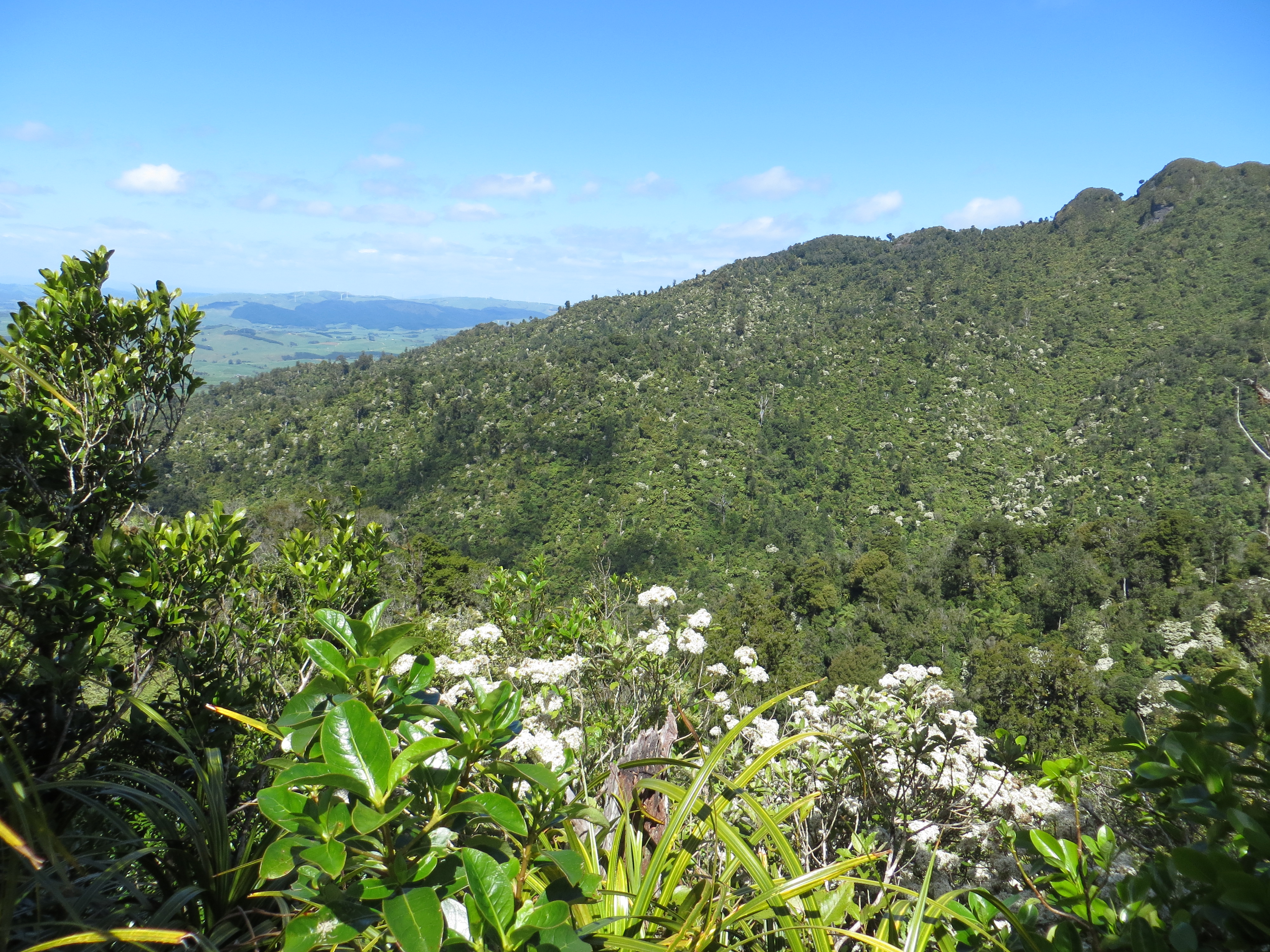
This November 2012 photo shows how well tree daisies have recovered and provoked much local interest in this 'new' phenomenon

The interval was determined by monitoring of 96 kohekohe, 43 kamahi and 8 Hall's totara, which had been tagged and were assessed annually for change in foliage cover, possum browse and trunk use.

The Karioi Biodiversity Restoration project is a community led project, run in partnership with A Rocha Aotearoa NZ, Te Whakaoranga O Karioi (translated as restoring Karioi to a healthy sustainable environment), DoC, and the Whaingaroa community. Trapping started in 2009 in the Upper Bryant Reserve with up to 60 volunteers maintaining around 150 rat, possum and stoat traps in 28 hectares (69 acres) of bush. By 2020 there were over 2,000 traps and 350 volunteers covering some 2,300 ha (5,700 acres). In the first 3 years 592 rats, 183 mice, 6 stoats, 26 possums and 13 hedgehogs were caught. 50 stoat traps were placed along the 5 km Te Toto Gorge to Ruapuke ridge track which caught 54 stoats and 73 rats in 2012.

Myrtle rust was found on some ramarama and rātā in 2018, but has been controlled and is being monitored.

== Walks ==
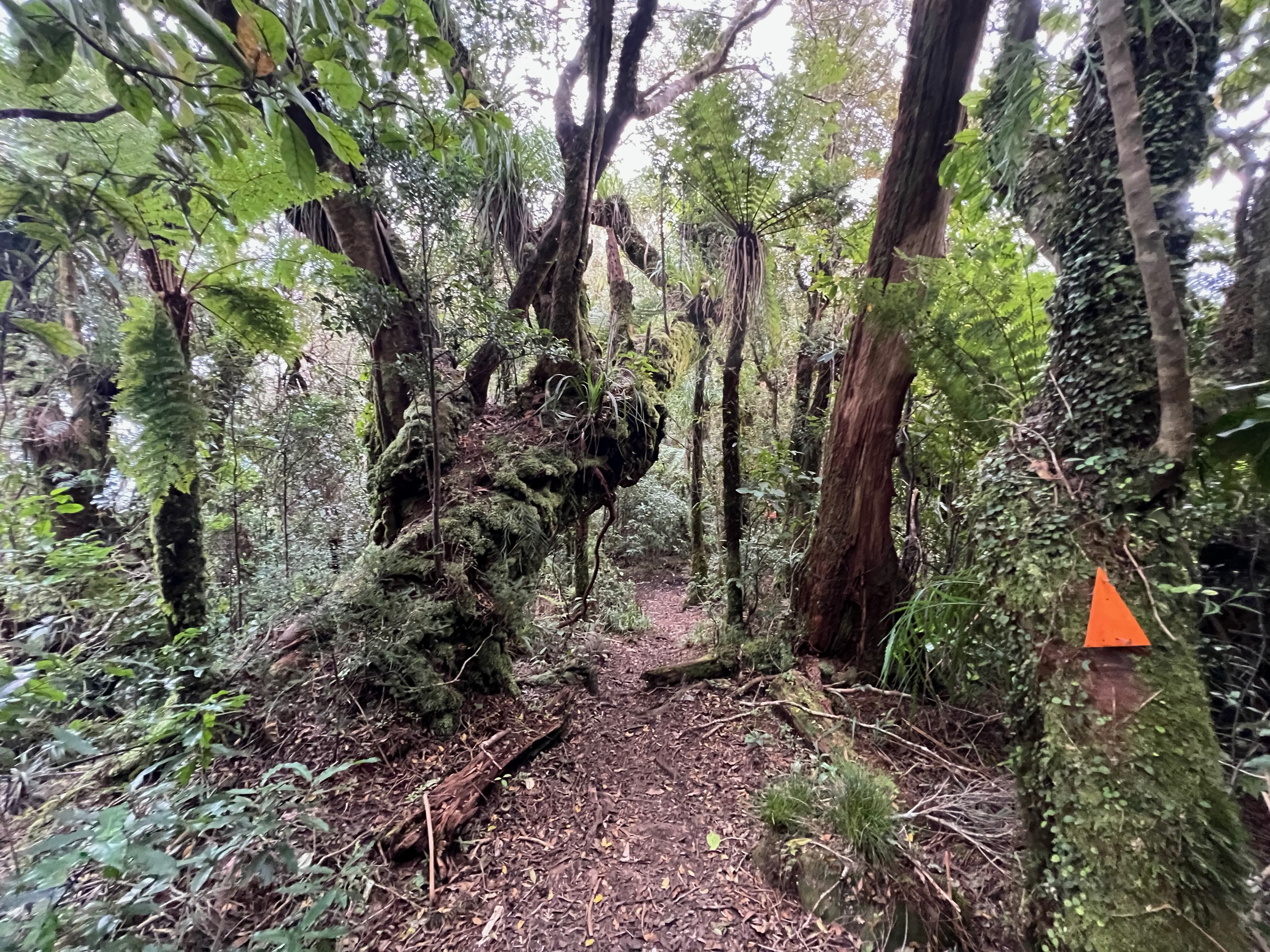
Wairake Track, the easier way up Karioi

Beyond Whale Bay the road is unsealed and, after crossing Te Toto Gorge, there is a car park (bikes are better sheltered in the bush above the car park). A short walk down from the car park is a view of the 150-metre (490 ft) high cliffs (see Geology above).

Climbing up from the car park is a DOC track to the 756 m (2,480 ft) top of Karioi. The signposted times of 2 hours to the 706 m (2,316 ft) lookout and 3 hours to the summit allow fit walkers time for admiring the views. The track is clearly marked and clear on the ground, but gets progressively harder, including a ladder and 2 chains. About halfway up, just before the first chain and ladder, is a viewpoint. The climb does not feature steps or chains, but there are plenty of tree roots to grasp hold of on other shorter, near-vertical sections. In most weather, ordinary stout shoes suffice with some care around the few boggy sections on the summit ridge.

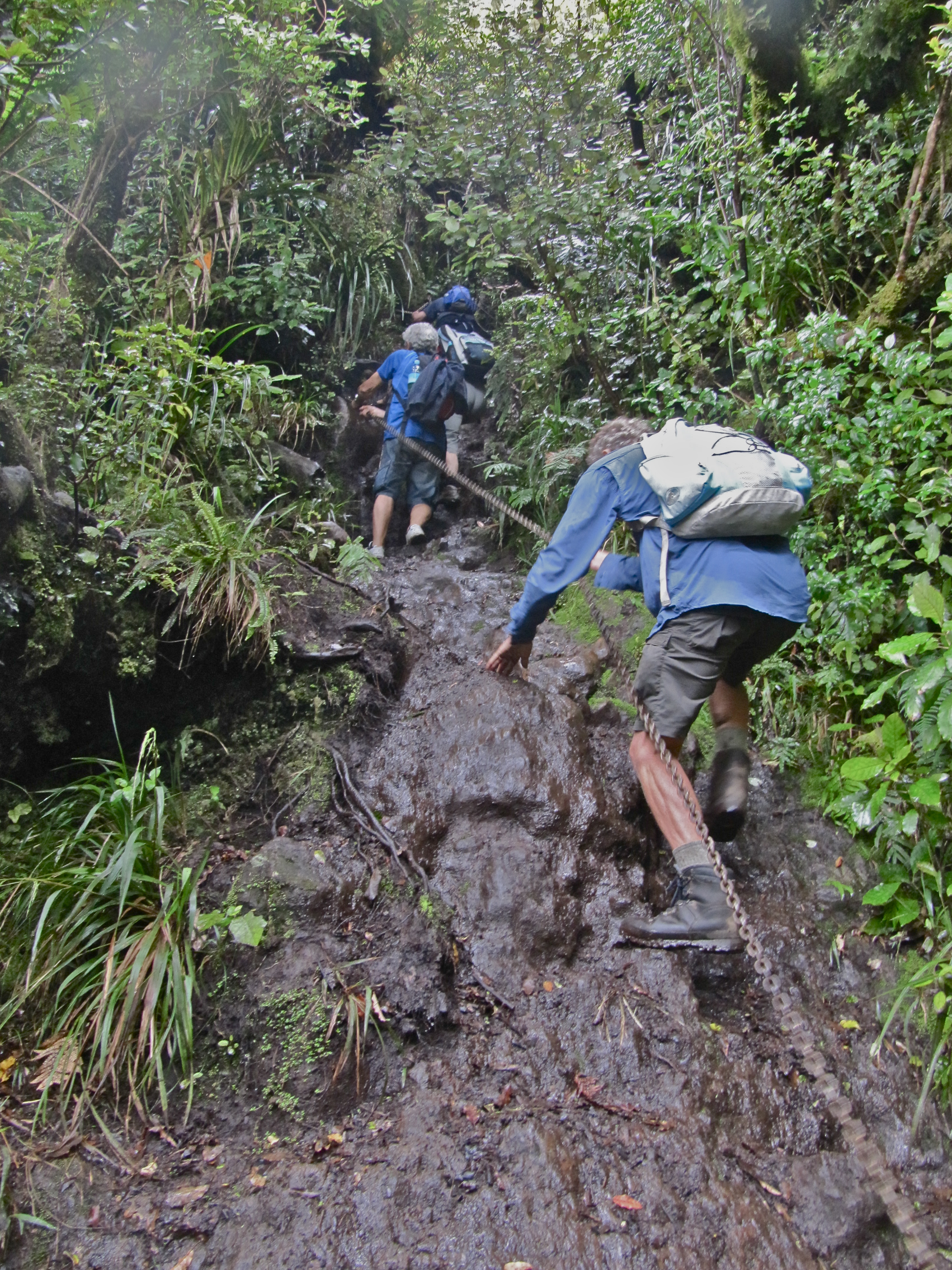
Climbing the chain from Te Toto to Karioi Lookout

From the lookout there is a good view of Raglan, the harbour and the coast north to the Waitakeres west of Auckland. If going on to the summit, there are similar, if not slightly better, views without the detour to the lookout. The final few metres to the summit involve an awkward drop back into the trees, a difficult traverse clambering over tree roots and a ladder to climb back up. The summit is topped with a small radio relay station powered by solar panels, a helicopter pad and a wind generator. From the summit Ruapuke Beach can be seen, as well as Aotea and Kāwhia Harbours and Albatross Point beyond. Twenty kilometres (12 mi) out to sea it is possible to see 13 m (43 ft) high Kārewa / Gannet Island and east to Mount Pirongia, north east to Hamilton and Coromandel and north to Whaingaroa Harbour with Lake Waikare and the Bombay Hills beyond. On clear days Mount Taranaki is visible, about 160 km (100 miles) to the SSW. Raglan West and the harbour entrance are hidden by the spur and better seen from the west end of the ridge.

The alternative easier route to Karioi is from Ruapuke Rd. It has little exposure to heights and no chains. The car park is indicated by a signpost from Ruapuke Rd. The track uses a farm road for the first kilometre until the track is signposted up the hill alongside a fence on the right and a stile leads into the bush. The track is then clear on the ground and marked. Possum bait station tracks are marked with pink plastic waymarks.

There is also a poorly marked track into Te Toto Gorge (see above).

== Tourism ==
The Raglan and Kawhia Districts 1915 guide said, “The summit of this mountain (which rises to a height of 2,420 feet (740 m) above sea level) may be reached by a beautiful drive from Raglan through unrivalled scenery. On a clear day a magnificent view may be obtained”. A 1911 Gilmour Brothers postcard showed a picnic party at Te Toto Gorge. In 2007 DoC replaced its 1981 viewing platform at Te Toto Gorge with one giving better views.
