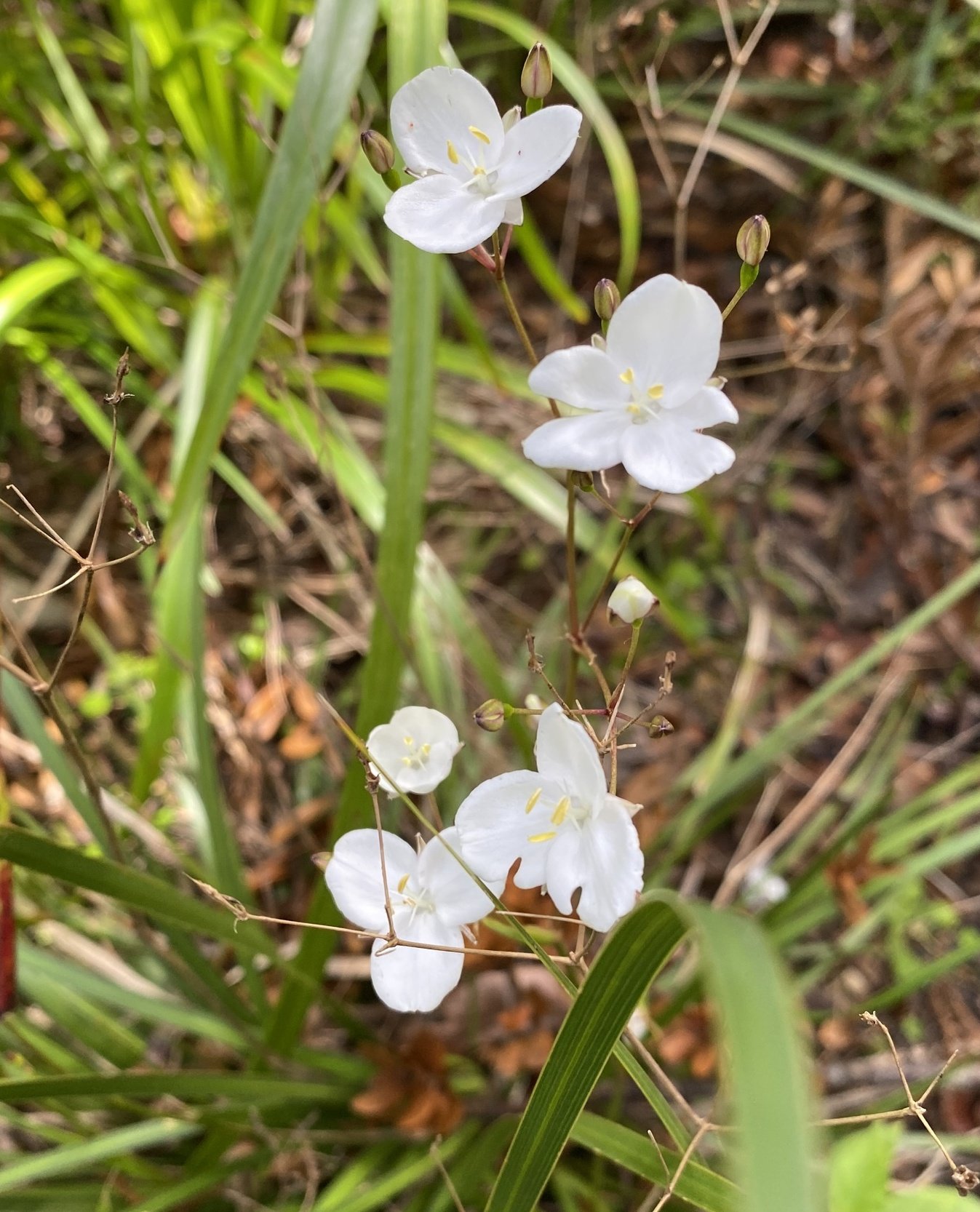
- Flowers of Libertia ixioides

Conservation status
- Not Threatened (NZ TCS)

Scientific classification
- Kingdom: Plantae
- Clade: Tracheophytes
- Clade: Angiosperms
- Clade: Monocots
- Order: Asparagales
- Family: Iridaceae
- Genus: Libertia
- Species: L. ixioides

Binomial name
- Libertia ixioides (G.Forst.) Spreng.

= Libertia ixioides =

Species of flowering plant

Libertia ixioides, commonly known as mikoikoi and the New Zealand iris, is a species of flowering plant in the family Iridaceae. It is endemic to New Zealand; its range covers the North, South, and Stewart Islands. L. ixioides is commonly found in coastal to montane areas; it inhabits cliffs, gullies, ridgelines, rocky places, and the banks of rivers. A perennial herb, it reaches 900 mm in height with leaves reaching 1160 mm in length. It was first described by Kurt Polycarp Joachim Sprengel in 1824. It gets its specific epithet, ixioides, after its similar resemblance to Ixia species.

== Description ==
Libertia ixioides is a species of perennial herb in the family Iridaceae and the subfamily Iridoideae. It reaches 0.6 metres (2 feet 0 inches) in height. Its leaves reach 550–1160 mm × 3–12 mm long, they also can turn to a yellow colour when exposed to sunlight. Its margins are often finely rough (scabrid) in texture. The inflorescences (flower clusters) are tall and rise above the foliage, with long peduncles. Its panicles are broad and openly branched. Each panicle has 1 to 6 flowers with slender pedicels, which are about 10– mm long. Its bracts are 50–410 mm long.

Flowers are 8–15 mm in diameter, with white-coloured tepals. Its stamens are found at the base, with yellow anthers which are about 2 mm long. Fruits are found in yellow-coloured, pear-shaped seed capsules, which are 15–25 × 5–14 mm long, initially green maturing to black, splitting open at maturity with often widely recurved valves. Its seeds are a bright tangerine-orange colour, 1–2 mm long, and rounded or angular in character.

== Taxonomy ==
The Libertia genus was first established in 1824 by the German botanist Kurt Polycarp Joachim Sprengel. L. ixioides was first described by Sprengel in 1824. The species has had several scientific synonyms since being first described in 1824. However, taxonomic revisions of the genus Libertia, such as Blanchon et al. (2002) and Moore (1967) categorise the species binomial name as Libertia ixioides. The inactive taxon, Libertia tricolor, has since been moved into L. ixioides. In 1952, Lucy Cranwell studied the pollination of various New Zealand plant species; in her study, she mentioned Libertia pollen provides no strong similarity with any other species.

=== Evolution ===
Goldblatt et al. (2008) hypothesised, based on DNA sequencing analysis data, that Orthrosanthus appears to be the most closely related genus to Libertia. The lineage, consisting of Libertia and Orthrosanthus, appears to have split from other groups around twenty-seven million years ago, with Libertia and Orthrosanthus (or their respective ancestors) diverging from each other in the Early Miocene, likely around twenty-two million years ago. A 1980 analysis by D. C. Mildenhall of Libertia pollen from the Mid Miocene in New Zealand also supports the estimated divergence time for the genus.

=== Etymology ===
The etymology (word origin) of L. ixioides's genus name, Libertia, is named in honour of the Belgian botanist and writer Marie-Anne Libert. The specific epithet (second part of the scientific name), ixioides, refers to the species resemblance to Ixia species. The species is commonly known as mikoikoi and New Zealand iris. L. ixioides has several other Māori names, recorded by Herbert Williams, including: mānga-a-huripapa, tūrutu, and tūkāuki.

== Distribution ==
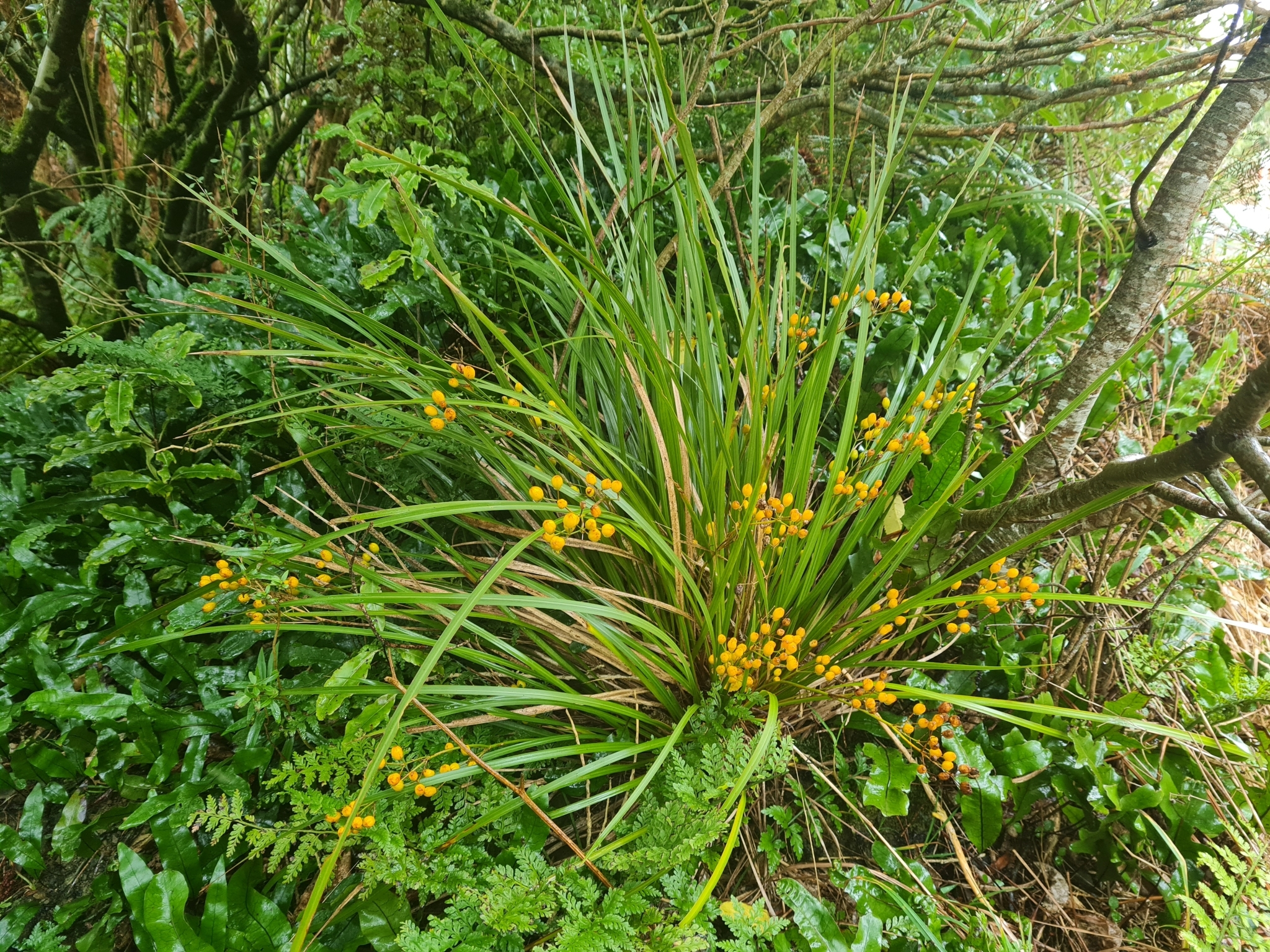
L. ixioides in its natural habitat

Libertia ixioides is endemic to New Zealand. Its range covers the North, South, and Stewart Islands. Cheeseman (1906) claimed that the species is also present on the Chatham Islands, but recent assessments of Libertia dispute this, and argue that the species does not naturally occur on the Chatham Islands. In the North Island, L. ixioides is widespread from North Cape to Wellington, except it is naturally not common in the East Cape (in the Gisborne District). L. ixioides is common throughout the South Island. L. ixioides is also present on Stewart Island. L. ixioides's 2023 assessment in the New Zealand Threat Classification System was "Not Threatened".

=== Habitat ===
Libertia grandiflora inhabits coastal to montane areas. The species typically occurs in upland forests, cliffs, gullies, ridgelines, and the banks of rivers. L. ixioides is often found in rocky environments, especially in the South Island. It has been recorded growing epiphytically (on other plants) in certain locations in the North Island. It occurs from sea level to 610 m (2,000 ft) above sea level. It prefers areas with sun or partial shade. It commonly coincides with various endemic New Zealand plants, such as Coprosma robusta and Phormium tenax.

== Ecology ==
Libertia species are pollinated by insects, and its seeds are likely dispersed by the wind. A 1993 study of the diet of introduced goats in New Zealand reported that they consumed L. ixioides in moderate quantities compared with other species studied. L. ixioides is known to play host to 'leafminer weevils' of the genus Microcryptorhynchus, which chew the leaves.

== Works cited ==
Books

- Cheeseman, T. F. (1906). Manual of the New Zealand flora (1 ed.). Wellington, New Zealand: New Zealand Board of Science and Art.
- Cranwell, Lucy May (1952). New Zealand pollen studies: the monocotyledons: a comparative account. Auckland, New Zealand: Harvard University Press.
- Crowe, Andrew (2009). Which Native Forest Plant?. Auckland, New Zealand: Penguin Books. ISBN 978-0-14-300901-6.
- Clausen, Ruth Rogers; Christopher, Thomas (2015). Essential Perennials: The Complete Reference to 2700 Perennials for the Home Garden. Timber Press. ISBN 1-60469-316-9.
- Gledhill, David (2008). The Names of Plants. Cambridge, United Kingdom: Cambridge University Press. ISBN 978-0-521-68553-5.
- Laing, R. M.; Blackwell, E. W. (1906). Plants of New Zealand. Christchurch, New Zealand: Whitcombe and Tombs.
- Williams, Herbert William (1917). A Dictionary of the Maori Language (in Māori). Wellington, New Zealand: Polynesian Society.

Journals

- Andersen, Johannes C. (1946). "Maori Words Incorporated into the English Language". The Journal of the Polynesian Society. 55 (2). Polynesian Society: 141–162. ISSN 0032-4000. JSTOR 20703046.
- Bernardello, Gabriel; Anderson, Gregory J.; Stuessy, Tod F.; Crawford, Daniel J. (2001). "A survey of floral traits, breeding systems, floral visitors, and pollination systems of the angiosperms of the Juan Fernández Islands (Chile)". The Botanical Review. 67 (3): 255–308. doi:10.1007/BF02858097. ISSN 0006-8101.
- Blanchon, D. J.; Murray, B. G.; Braggins, J. E. (2002). "A taxonomic revision of Libertia (Iridaceae) in New Zealand". New Zealand Journal of Botany. 40 (3): 437–456. doi:10.1080/0028825X.2002.9512805. ISSN 0028-825X.
- Goldblatt, Peter; Celis, Marcela (2005). "Notes on Libertia (Iridaceae: Sisyrinchieae) in South America". Contributions to Botany. 21 (4). The Botanical Research Institute of Texas, Inc.: 2105–2112. ISSN 0036-1488. JSTOR 41968506.
- Goldblatt, Peter; Rodriguez, Aaron; Powell, M. P.; Davies, Jonathan T.; Manning, John C.; Van der Bank, M.; Savolainen, Vincent (2008). "Iridaceae 'Out of Australasia'? Phylogeny, Biogeography, and Divergence Time Based on Plastid DNA Sequences". Systematic Botany. 33 (3): 495–508. doi:10.1600/036364408785679806. ISSN 0363-6445.
- Parkes, J.P. (1993). "Feral goats: Designing solutions for a designer pest". New Zealand Journal of Ecology. 17 (2). New Zealand Ecological Society: 71–83. ISSN 0110-6465. JSTOR 44945333.
- Moore, L. B. (1967). "The New Zealand species of Libertia (Iridaceae)". New Zealand Journal of Botany. 5 (2): 255–275. doi:10.1080/0028825X.1967.10428745. ISSN 0028-825X.
- Thorsen, Michael J.; Dickinson, Katharine J.M.; Seddon, Philip J. (2009). "Seed Dispersal Systems in the New Zealand Flora". Perspectives in Plant Ecology. 11 (4). Elsevier BV: 285–309. doi:10.1016/j.ppees.2009.06.001. ISSN 1433-8319.

Miscellaneous

- De Lange, Peter J.; Gosden, Jane; Courtney, Shannel; Fergus, Alexander Jon; Barkla, John W.; Beadel, S. M.; Champion, Paul D.; Hindmarsh-Walls, Rowan; Makan, Troy; Michel, Pascale (29 October 2024). "Conservation status of vascular plants in Aotearoa New Zealand, 2023" (PDF). Department of Conservation. ISSN 2324-1713. Archived (PDF) from the original on 10 February 2025.
- Daly, Gerry (5 June 2024). "Gardening with Gerry: Lovely Libertia Leads the Way". Irish Farmers Journal. Archived from the original on 15 July 2025.
- De Lange, Peter (2025). "Libertia ixioides". New Zealand Plant Conservation Network. Archived from the original on 20 April 2025.
