= Kārewa / Gannet Island =

Island in New Zealand

Māori: Kārewa
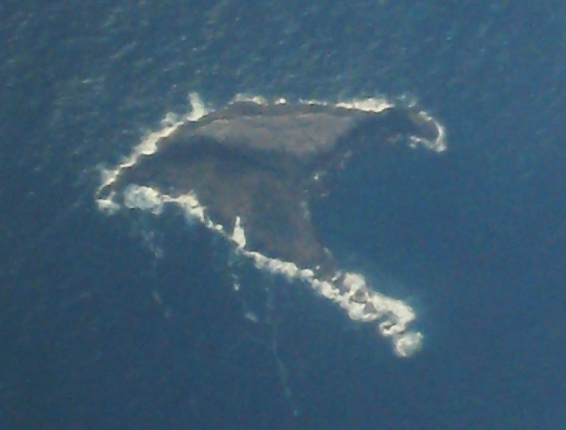
- Aerial view of Gannet Island

- Location within New Zealand

Geography
- Location: Waikato region
- Coordinates: 37°58′19″S 174°33′58″E
- Highest elevation: 15 m (49 ft)

Administration
- New Zealand

Demographics
- Population: 0

Kārewa / Gannet Island (Māori: Kārewa) is a small island some 19 kilometres (12 miles) offshore from Kawhia on the west coast of New Zealand's North Island.

== Description ==
The island consists of the eroded remnant of a tuff ring, erupted about half a million years ago. It is considerably younger than, and compositionally distinct from, the nearby onshore Alexandra Volcanics (Mount Karioi and Mount Pirongia) and Okete Volcanics. It is located on the eastern edge of the North Taranaki Graben, rising 15 metres (49 ft) above sea level from a base about 65 metres (213 ft) deep. In heavy swells the island can be washed over, so that only about 3 square metres (32 sq ft) has vegetation and that limited to Prasiola (algae), Tortula (moss) and Xanthoria, and Xanthoparmelia lichens.

== Gannets ==
Protected as a wildlife sanctuary, it was found to be the country's largest single breeding colony of Australasian gannets in a 1980 census. Holding about 8000 breeding pairs, the island has been identified as an Important Bird Area, by BirdLife International.

== See also ==
- List of islands
- List of islands of New Zealand
- List of volcanoes in New Zealand
- Desert island
