= Laurence Cussen =

- Laurence Cussen
- Born: 1 October 1843; County Limerick, Ireland
- Died: 9 November 1903 (aged 60)
- Occupation: Surveyor
- Spouse: Annie Wallnutt
- Children: 10
- Parent(s): John Sandes Cussen and Catherine Carroll

Laurence Cussen (1 October 1843 – 9 November 1903) was a pioneering surveyor and geologist. He was born in Rockhill, two kilometres southwest of Bruree County Limerick, Ireland on 1 October 1843, to John Sandes Cussen and Catherine Carroll. He was educated at St Stanislaus College Jesuit school at Tullabeg, County Offaly. He worked for a time with the East India Company before moving to New Zealand. William Cussen his brother, also worked as a surveyor, and both of them played some rugby while in Auckland. From 1876 he spent 15 years triangulating a large part of the former Auckland Province. He published many research papers including early documentation of Māori people and was a member of the Royal Geographical Society of Australasia.

He died at home in Hamilton in November 1903 after a short illness, and was buried in Hamilton West Cemetery. He was survived by 8 of his 10 children and his widow. One of his sons, Jack, lived at Ruapuke and, from 1927 till his death in 1950, at nearby Te Mata.

== Early life ==
He arrived in Auckland, New Zealand, on the Louisa on 28 March 1865, accompanied by his parents and six other family members. The Cussens settled in Auckland but little is known of Laurence Cussen's life there until January 1869 when he was licensed 'to survey lands under "The Native Lands Act, 1865".' He first worked as a surveyor on the Thames goldfield. Later he helped with surveys for the railways between Auckland and Riverhead, and Hamilton and Ngāruawāhia. In the 1870s Laurence and his younger brother, William, also a surveyor, played in several Auckland representative rugby teams. In July 1874 Laurence Cussen became assistant engineer to the Public Works Department and worked in Otago on the Kaihiku section of the South Island main trunk railway. He returned to Auckland in October 1875 and by the end of the year was surveying near Wairoa. In March 1877 Cussen was appointed district surveyor for the Auckland land district in the department of the surveyor general. On 17 October of the same year, at St Francis' Catholic Church, Shortland, Thames, he married Annie Wallnutt, who was also of Irish birth. The couple settled in Hamilton, on a section in Victoria Street overlooking the Waikato River. The first of their 11 children – eight girls and three boys – was born the following year.

== Pioneering surveys ==
As district surveyor Cussen had responsibility for the whole of the Waikato region. When the King Country was opened to European settlement in 1883, Cussen and his staff carried out the triangulation survey of this huge area stretching from Kihikihi to Mt Ruapehu. Work commenced in December 1883 and by the following August 43 trigonometrical stations had been erected covering over two million acres. It was heavy work in difficult country, and the surveyors often encountered localised opposition from Maori. Nevertheless, the survey went ahead steadily and in his reports Cussen gave detailed accounts of the country and its potential for development. In the course of this work Cussen climbed Mts Ngauruhoe, Tongariro and Ruapehu, giving graphic descriptions of them and making observations on their geology. His 1886 report included a hydrographic survey of Lake Taupo and in 1891 he presented the first topographical survey of the mountains, accompanied by detailed maps. Rock specimens that he collected were sent to A. P. W. Thomas, professor of natural science at Auckland University College, who described them in a paper read to a meeting of the Auckland Institute in November 1887. Cussen, himself a member of the institute, presented papers on the geology of Mt Ruapehu, Waikato and the King Country. He was the first observer to report on thermal activity in Ruapehu's crater lake, and he reached some astute conclusions on the potential dangers from lahar events on the Whangaehu River and other rivers flowing from the mountain. He was a fellow of the Royal Geographical Society, a corresponding member of the Royal Geographical Society of Australasia and an early member of the New Zealand Institute of Surveyors.

== Maori ==
Cussen was also interested in the Maori people of the King Country. He noted evidence of a greatly reduced population in that area, thus correcting the view held by most Pakeha. He described Maori living conditions and methods of obtaining food and took numerous photographs, which provide a valuable record of contemporary Maori life. In spite of his strenuous life in the field, Cussen found time to become involved in community life in Hamilton. In 1882 he read an address of welcome to the Catholic bishop, Dr Edmund Luck, and at various times he organised or assisted with functions in aid of the Catholic church and schools, sometimes taking part in musical and dramatic entertainments. Other interests were horticulture, poultry breeding and horse-racing – he often acted as judge at the races. He also belonged to the Hamilton Legislative Association.

== Death ==
In August 1903 Laurence Cussen, who by this time was also inspecting surveyor for the Auckland district, wrote to the surveyor general enquiring about his eligibility for a pension. He died at his home, after some weeks of illness, on 9 November 1903. His wife, Annie Cussen, lived until 1943. Both were buried in the Hamilton West cemetery.

Laurence Cussen was intelligent, resourceful and determined; a man of many interests and sociable by nature. He was 'uniformly courteous and high spirited, with a keen sense of honour, which guided him in his relations with his fellow men and commanded their respect and affection.' In appearance he was slightly built, of medium height, with a reddish, freckled face. Cussen's pioneering survey of the King Country was the essential preliminary to the development of roads, the main trunk railway and farm settlement. His name is commemorated in Cussen Street, Hamilton, and Cussen Road near Morrinsville.
