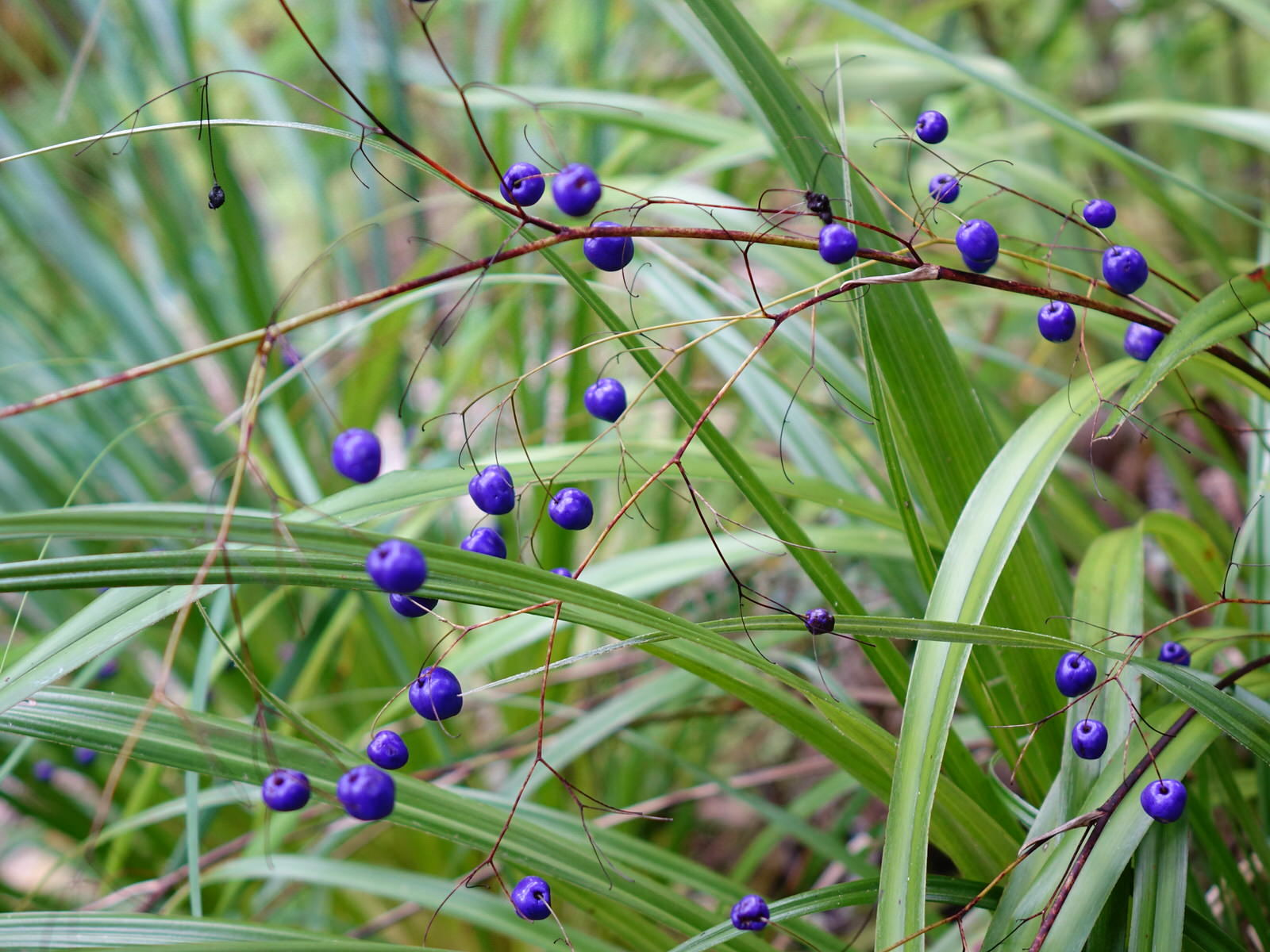
- Hanging violet-blue berries

Conservation status
- Not Threatened (NZ TCS)

Scientific classification
- Kingdom: Plantae
- Clade: Tracheophytes
- Clade: Angiosperms
- Clade: Monocots
- Order: Asparagales
- Family: Asphodelaceae
- Subfamily: Hemerocallidoideae
- Genus: Dianella
- Species: D. nigra

Binomial name
- Dianella nigra Colenso

Synonyms
- Dianella intermedia F.Br.; Dianella reflexa Colenso

= Dianella nigra =

Species of flowering plant

Dianella nigra, commonly known as turutu, inkberry, and the New Zealand blueberry, is a species of flowering plant in the family Asphodelaceae. It is endemic to New Zealand. Its range mainly covers the North and South Islands. It is typically found in coastal to montane environments, and the species can colonise various different habitats. A perennial herb, the species is known for its vibrant violet-blue berries and long green leaves.

Dianella nigra was first described in 1884 by the New Zealand botanist William Colenso. D. nigra's pollination strategy is not well-studied. Berries are recorded to be eaten by the silvereye, a small native bird. Despite this, there is a historical record from the late 1800s of an infant death linked to ingestion of the berries, as such, they may be poisonous to humans. Its 2023 conservation status in the New Zealand Threat Classification System is "Not Threatened".

== Description ==
Dianella nigra is a species of perennial herb in the family Asphodelaceae and the subfamily Hemerocallidoideae. It is evergreen, dense, tussock-like with horizontal rhizomes which are up to 150 mm long or more. Leaves are 250 mm–800 mm × 12 mm–18 mm (9.84 in–31.50 in × 0.47 in–0.71 in) long. They are green to dark green in colour, curved and hanging. The laminae (leaf blades) are smooth. Leaf bases are light green to dark green in colour. The sheaths have a narrow red-coloured margins.

The inflorescences can rise up to 1 m (3 ft 3 in) above the foliage. The panicles are 300–500 mm (12–20 in) long. Flowers are 9–11 mm in diameter. Flowering typically occurs in November and December. The sepals are 4.4–4.5 × 1.6–1.7 mm. The petals are 3.5–4.0 × 2.3–3.4 mm and white to olive-green in colour. The glossy berries are 8–20 × 7–10 mm, and grey-white to violet-blue in colour. D. nigra's black seeds are 1.8–2.1 × 2.3–3.0 mm long.

=== Phytochemistry ===
The typically violet-blue colour of the berries of the Dianella genus is attributed to the anthocyanins and pigments in them.

== Gallery ==
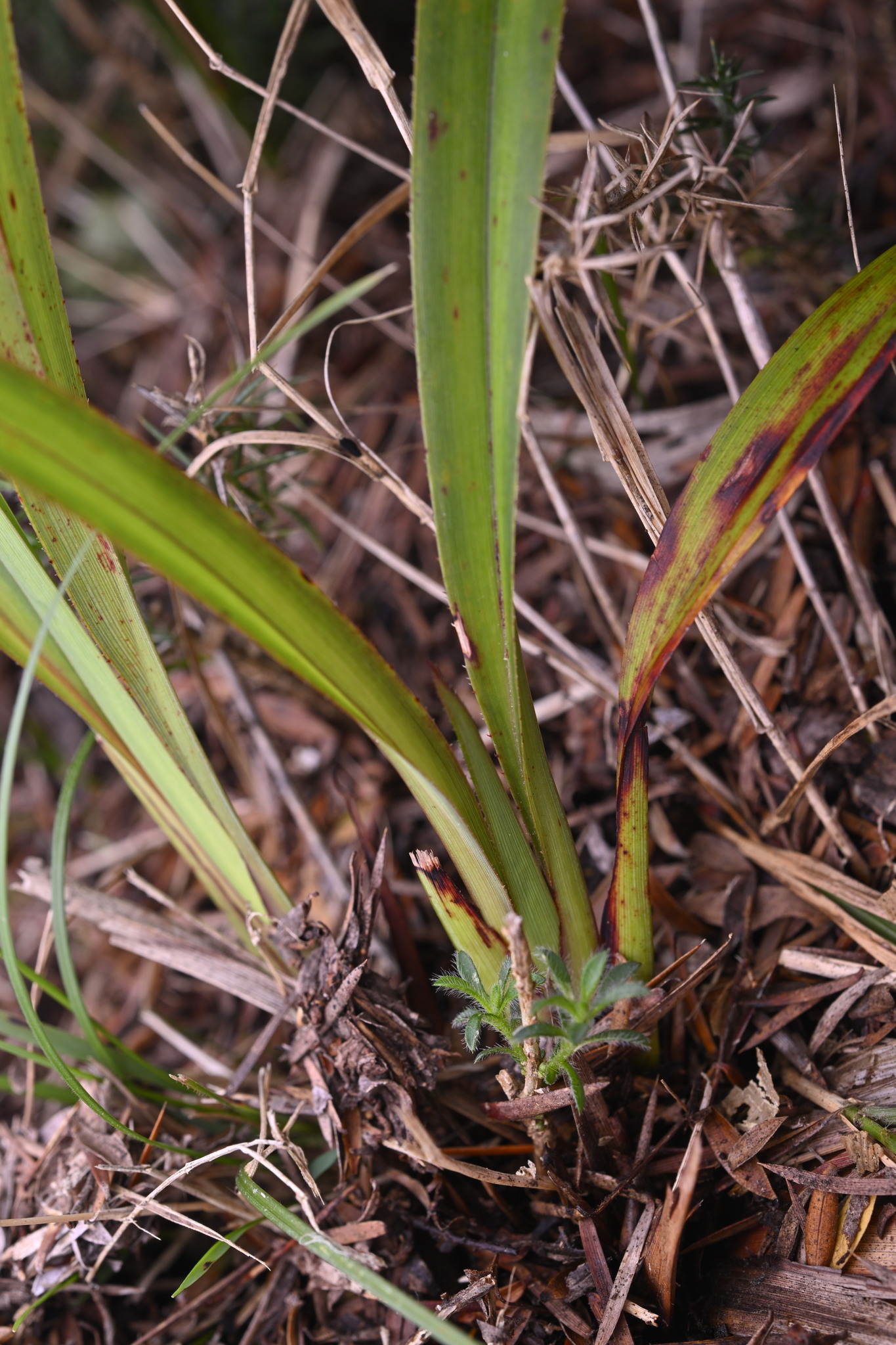
Leaf bases

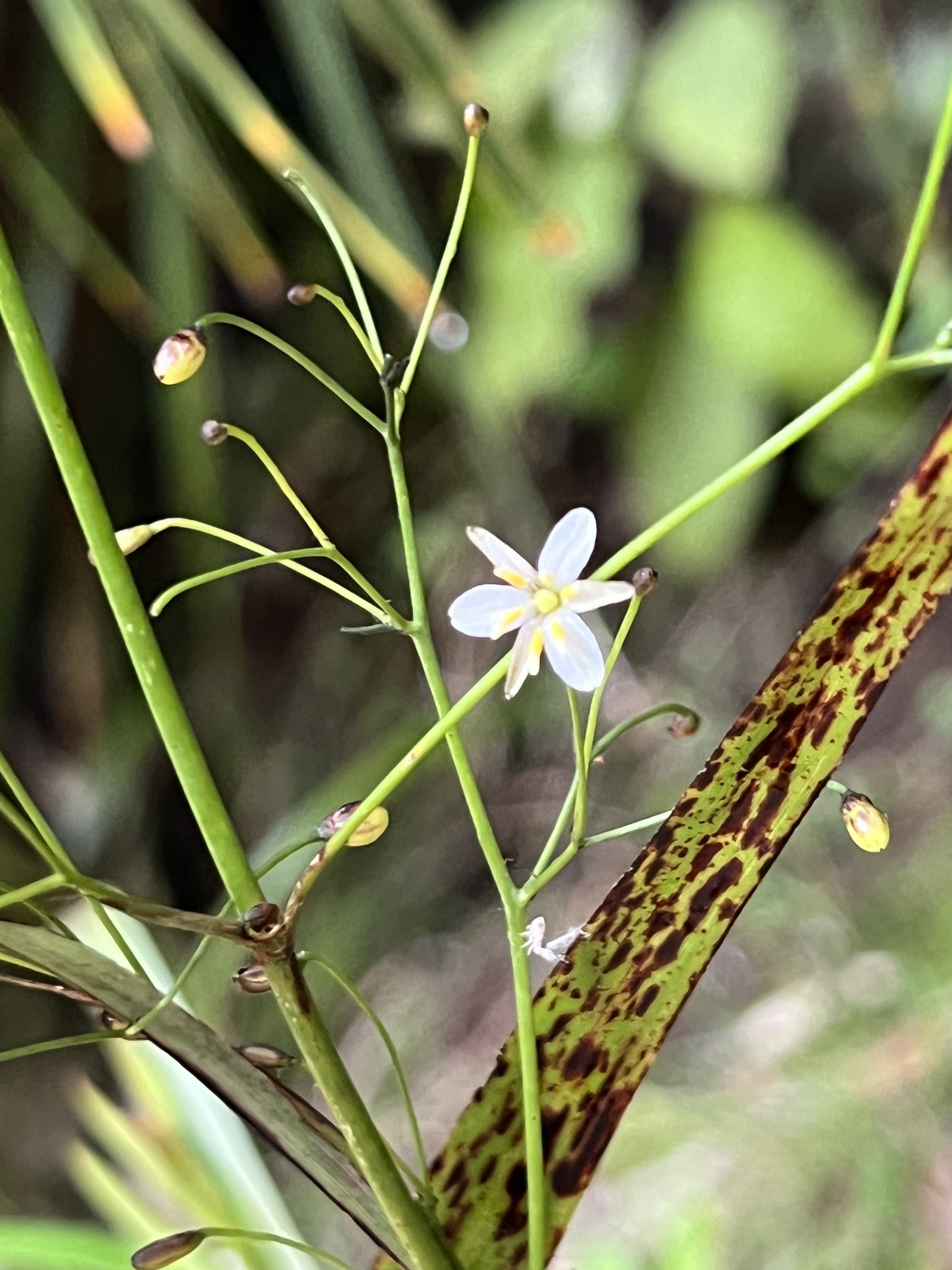
White flower and buds

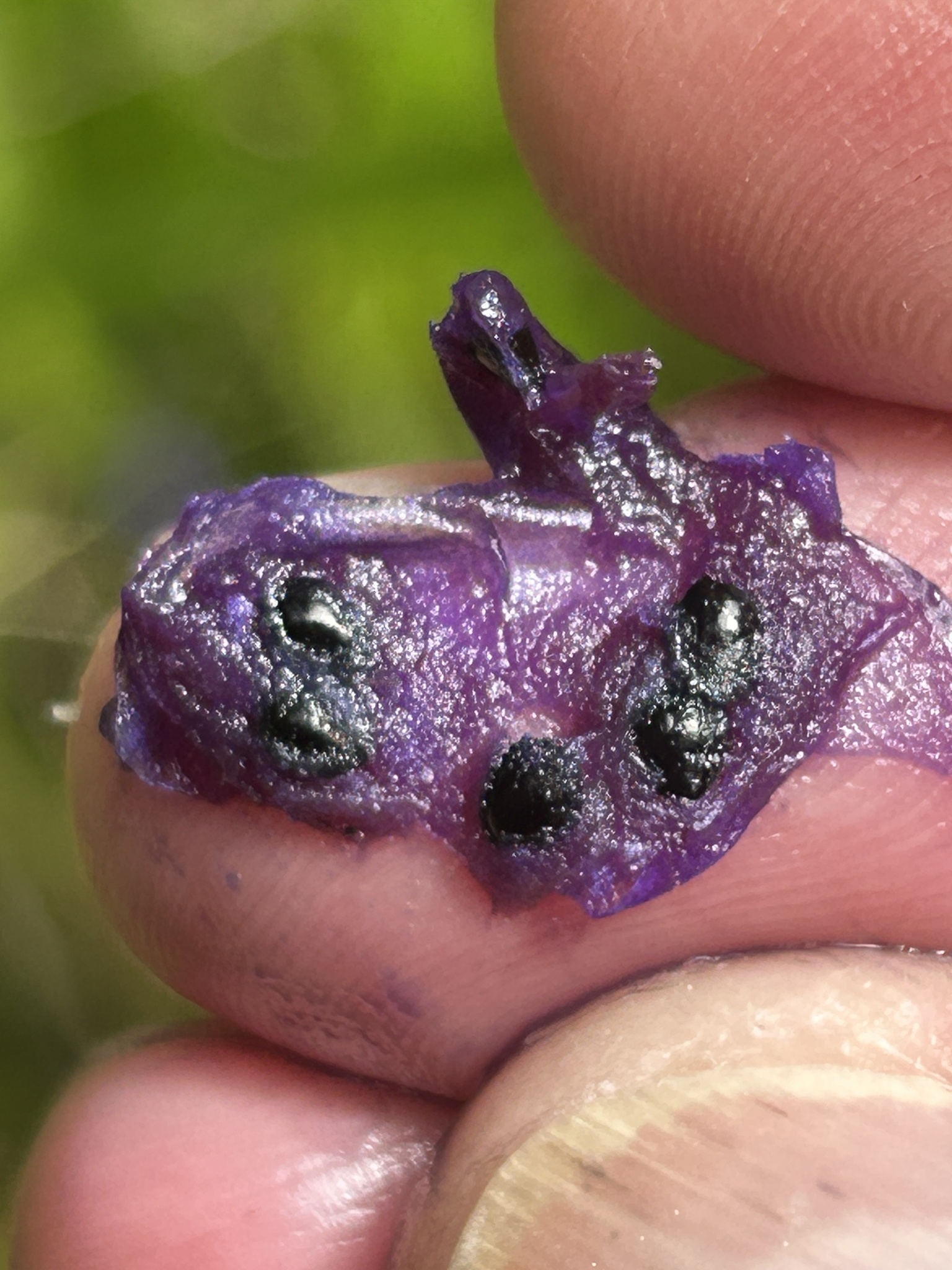
Inky juice of the purple berries and black seeds

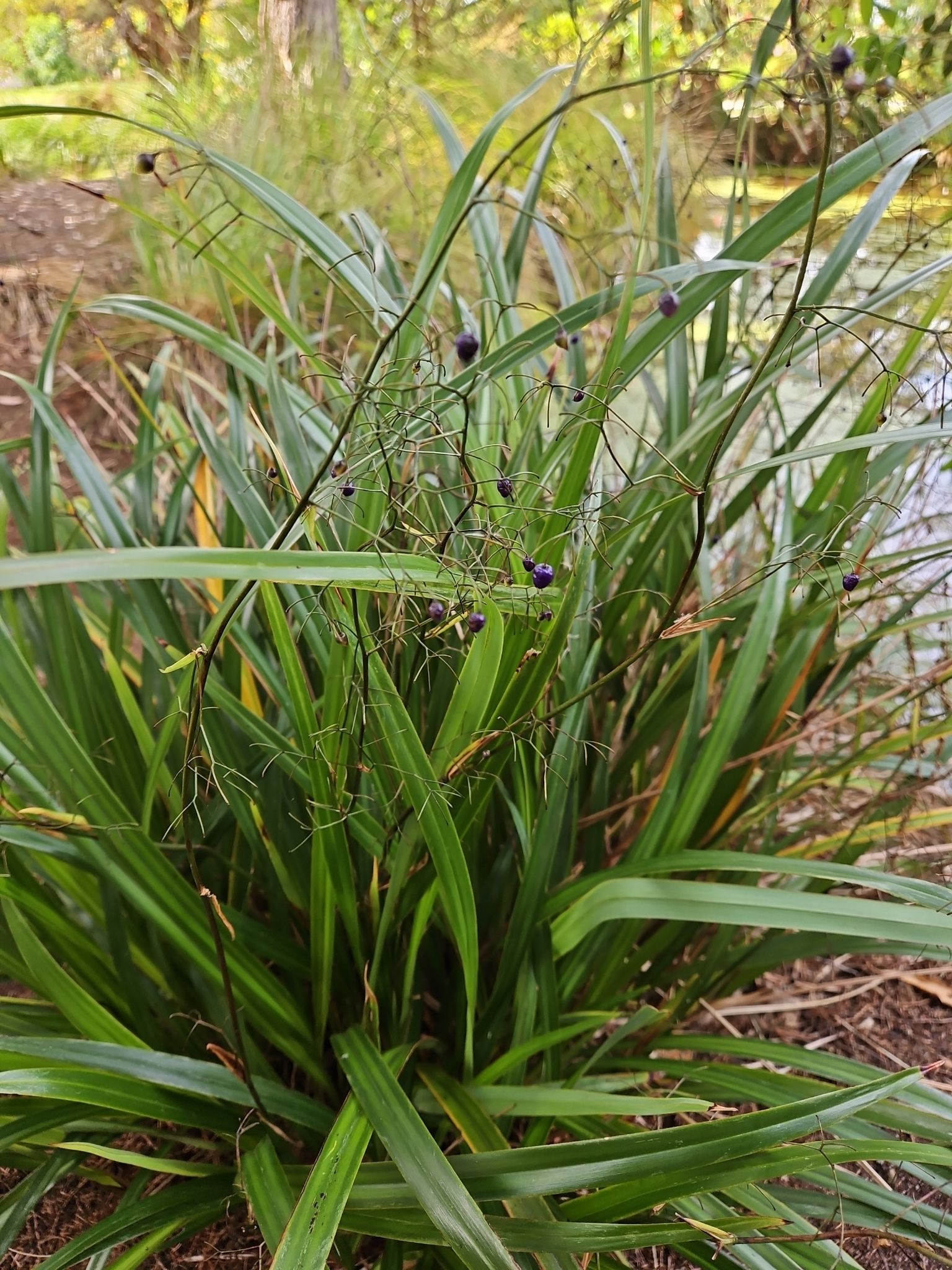
A mature specimen

== Taxonomy ==
The Dianella genus was first established in 1789 by the French naturalist Jean-Baptiste Lamarck. D. nigra was first described in 1884 by the New Zealand botanist William Colenso. In older publications, the plant might be referred to as Dianella intermedia and Dianella reflexa. There are forty species of the Dianella genus currently accepted by the Plants of the World Online taxonomic database. This genus is widespread and is found in several countries in Africa, Asia, and Oceania. The genus Dianella is closely related to Thelionema and Herpolirion. D. nigra is likely able to hybridise with D. haematica. D. intermedia of Norfolk Island is a sister species to the New Zealand members.

=== Etymology ===
The etymology (word origin) of the genus name, Dianella, refers to the Roman goddess of the chase Diana. The specific epithet (second part of the scientific name), nigra, means 'dark' or 'black'. The species is commonly known as turutu, inkberry, and New Zealand blueberry. The name inkberry comes from the inky juice produced by the berries. The other common name, turutu, means 'to drip', which refers to the berries falling freely.

== Distribution ==
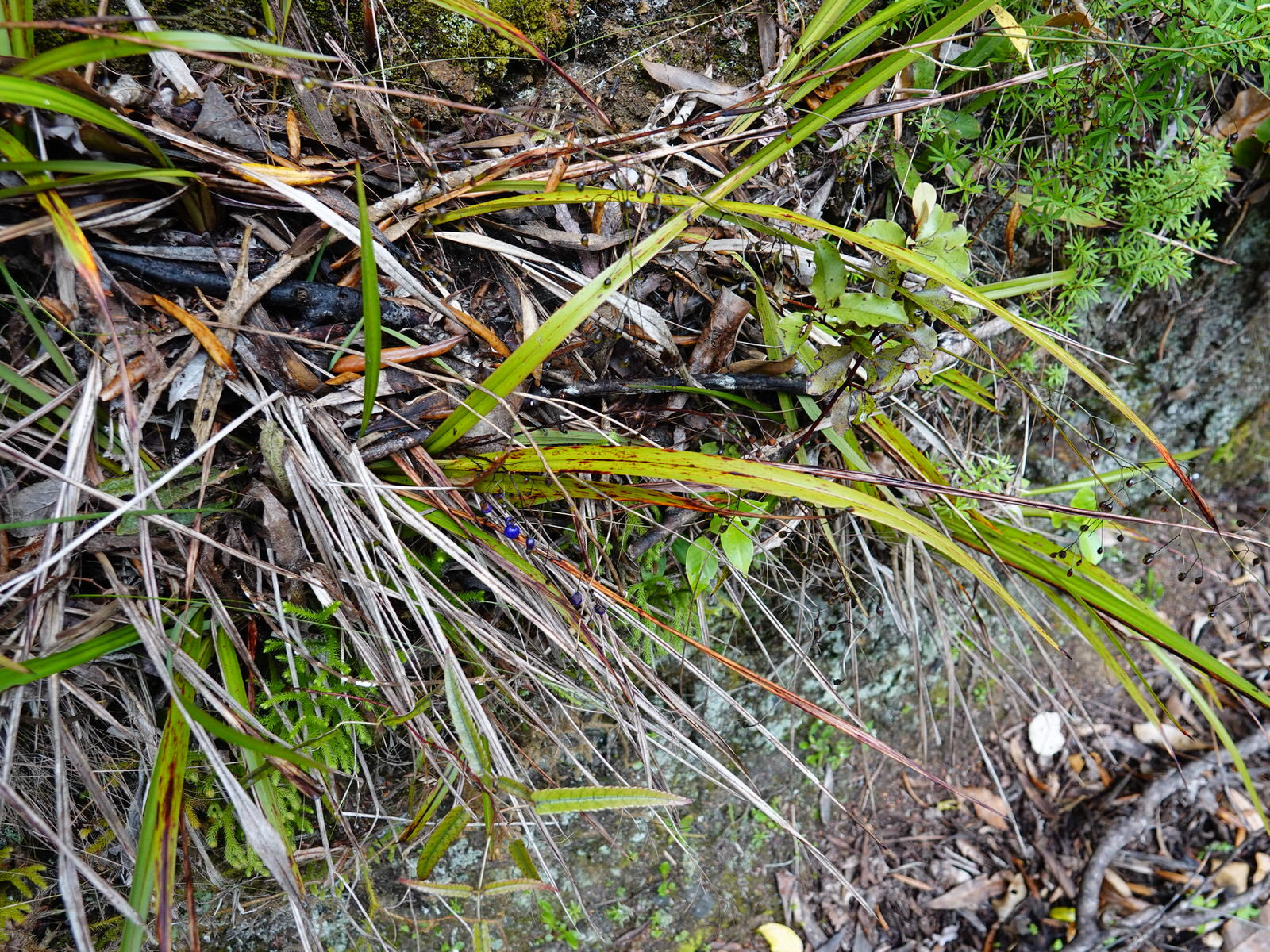
Habitat of Dianella nigra

Dianella nigra is endemic to New Zealand. Its range mainly covers the North and South Island. It also occurs on the Three Kings Islands. The plant generally occurs throughout the North Island. In the South Island, D. nigra is present in the Canterbury, Nelson, Marlborough, West Coast, and Otago regions. A population has been recorded near Lake Wānaka. There are no herbarium records collected from the Southland Region, but the botanist Thomas Cheeseman noted that the species is found south to Foveaux Strait. Its 2023 conservation status in the New Zealand Threat Classification System is "Not Threatened".

=== Habitat ===
Dianella nigra typically inhabits coastal to montane environments, reaching 1,100 m (3,600 ft) above sea level in maximum altitude. D. nigra prefers growing in partial shade on well-drained soils, typically growing beneath trees. D. nigra is capable of colonising various different habitats, ranging from coastal headlands and gumland scrub, clay banks, occasionally peat boglands to dense forest and rarely subalpine scrub. It is also present in geothermal fields in the Taupō Volcanic Zone.

== Ecology ==
The berries of D. haematica are dispersed by fruit-eating animals (frugivores). Berries are eaten by silvereyes (Zosterops lateralis). D. nigra's pollination strategy is not well-studied. Bees have been recorded visiting D. nigra to collect nectar. D. nigra plays host to 'leafminer weevils' from the genus Microcryptorhynchus, which chew the leaves.

== Uses ==
Dianella nigra has several recorded Māori names, including, piopio, pēpepe, rēua, and tūrutu. The only recorded use of the plant, according the ethnographer Elsdon Best, was the leaves being used to call birds. There is a historical record from the late 1800s of an infant death linked to ingestion of the berries, which could suggest the berries from this species are poisonous. D. nigra is also suspected to have caused deaths in pigs after they had consumed the roots of the plant. Despite D. nigra's potential toxicity, Indigenous Australians from the Sydney region traditionally ate the fruits raw from the Australian Dianella species. Dianella species have historically been used as rat poison in places such as China and Vietnam.

== Works cited ==
Books

- Cheeseman, T. F. (1906). Manual of the New Zealand flora (1 ed.). Wellington, New Zealand: Government of New Zealand.
- Clare, Rachel; Cracknell, Tryphena (2026). Aotearoa in Bloom. HarperCollins. ISBN 978-1-77554-268-1.
- Crowe, Andrew (2009). Which Native Forest Plant?. Auckland, New Zealand: Penguin Books. ISBN 978-0-14-300901-6.
- Garnock-Jones, Philip (2025). He Puāwai. Auckland, New Zealand: Auckland University Press. ISBN 978-1-77671-168-0.
- Gledhill, David (2008). The Names of Plants. Cambridge, United Kingdom: Cambridge University Press. ISBN 978-0-521-68553-5.
- Metcalf, Lawrie (2009). Know Your New Zealand Native Plants. Auckland, New Zealand: White Cloud Books. ISBN 978-1-77694-036-3.
- Moore, Lucy B. (1978). The Oxford Book of New Zealand Plants. Oxford University Press. ISBN 978-0-19-558035-8.

Journals

- Aston, B.C. (1923). "The Poisonous, Suspected, and Medicinal Plants of New Zealand". New Zealand Journal of Agriculture. 26 (3) – via PapersPast.
- Bloor, Stephen J (2001). "Deep Blue Anthocyanins from Blue Dianella Berries". Phytochemistry. 58 (6): 923–927. doi:10.1016/S0031-9422(01)00343-0.
- Butz Huryn, Vivian M. (1995). "Use of native New Zealand plants by honey bees (Apis mellifera L.): A review". New Zealand Journal of Botany. 33 (4): 497–512. doi:10.1080/0028825X.1995.10410621. ISSN 0028-825X.
- Colenso, William (1884). "Transactions and Proceedings of the New Zealand Institute". Royal Society of New Zealand. 16.
- Colenso, William (1894). "Transactions and Proceedings of the New Zealand Institute". Royal Society of New Zealand. 27.
- Devey, Dion; Leitch, Ilia; Pires, Chris; Pillon, Yohan; Chase, Mark (2006). "Systematics of Xanthorrhoeaceae Sensu Lato, with an Emphasis on Bulbine". Aliso. 22 (1): 345–351. doi:10.5642/aliso.20062201.28.
- Heenan, P. B.; De Lange, P. J. (2007). "Two new species of Dianella (Hemerocallidaceae) from New Zealand". New Zealand Journal of Botany. 45 (1): 269–285. doi:10.1080/00288250709509714. ISSN 0028-825X.
- May, Brenda M. (1987). "Immature Stages of Curculionoidea (Coleoptera): Rearing Records 1964-1986". New Zealand Entomologist. 9 (1): 44–56. doi:10.1080/00779962.1987.9722492. ISSN 0077-9962.
- Muscat, Karen M.; Ladiges, Pauline Y.; Bayly, Michael J. (2019). "Molecular phylogenetic relationships reveal taxonomic and biogeographic clades in Dianella (flax lilies; Asphodelaceae, Hemerocallidoideae)". Systematics and Biodiversity. 17 (3): 308–329. doi:10.1080/14772000.2019.1607617. ISSN 1477-2000.
- Smale, Mark C.; Wiser, Susan K.; Bergin, Michael J.; Fitzgerald, Neil B. (2017). "A Classification of the Geothermal Vegetation of the Taupō Volcanic Zone, New Zealand". Journal of the Royal Society of New Zealand. 48 (1). Wiley: 21–38. doi:10.1080/03036758.2017.1322619. ISSN 0303-6758.

Websites

- De Lange, Peter (2026). "Dianella nigra". New Zealand Plant Conservation Network. Archived from the original on 19 March 2025.
- "Dianella Lam. ex Juss". Plants of the World Online. Archived from the original on 17 December 2024 – via Royal Botanic Gardens, Kew.
- "Dianella nigra Colenso, Trans. & Proc. New Zealand Inst. xvi. (1884)". The Royal Botanic Gardens, Kew, Harvard University Herbaria & Libraries and Australian National Herbarium. International Plant Names Index. 2026. Archived from the original on 10 May 2025.
- "Ngā Rauropi Whakaoranga — Dianella nigra. Rēua. Piopio". Manaaki Whenua – Landcare Research. 2020. Archived from the original on 10 August 2024.
