= Te Raupua =

Mountain in the Northland Region of New Zealand

Highest point
- Elevation: 787 m (2,582 ft)
- Prominence: 772 m (2,533 ft)
- Coordinates: 35°31′31″S 173°30′39″E

Naming
- English translation: The Petal
- Language of name: Maori

Geography
- Country: New Zealand
- Region: Northland

Te Raupua (meaning "The Petal" in Māori) in the Waimā Range is the highest mountain in the Northland Region, New Zealand.

It is situated about 90 kilometres (56 mi) northwest of Dargaville near the Hokianga Harbour. The peak is about 40 kilometres (25 mi) north of Tutamoe, Northland's second-highest summit at 770 metres (2,530 ft).
