= Ruapuke =

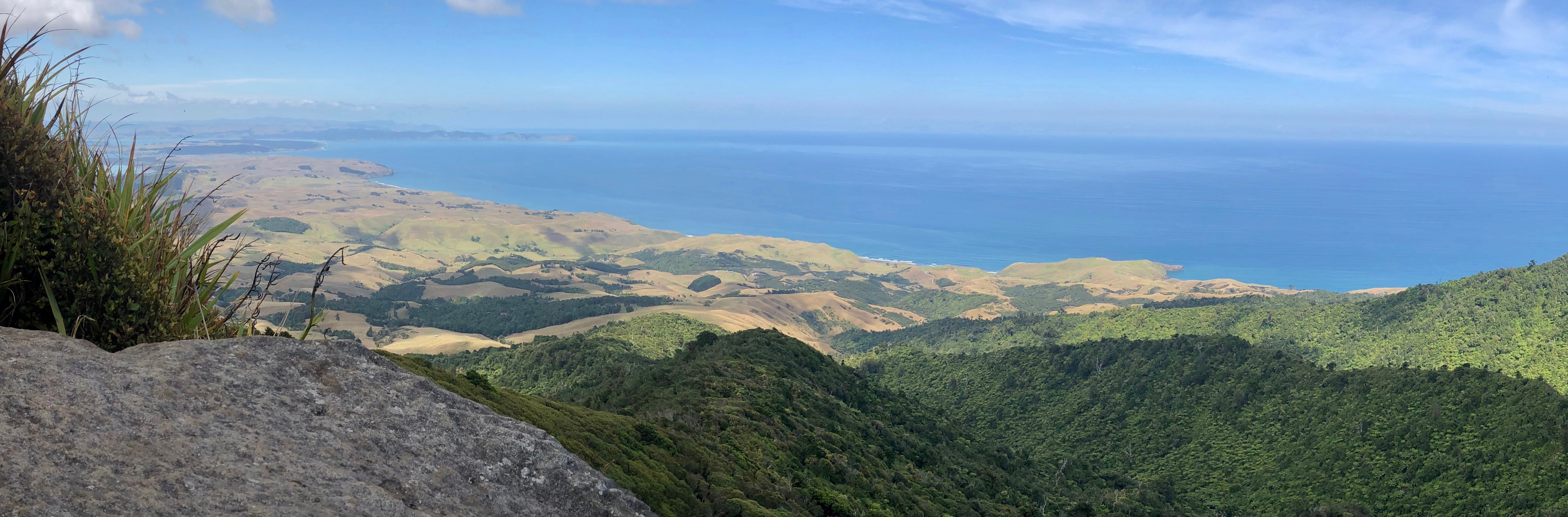
- Ruapuke from Karioi summit, with Aotea Harbour and Albatross Point beyond

- Location within New Zealand
- Coordinates: 37.91351°S 174.78702°E
- Country: New Zealand
- Region: Waikato
- Territorial authority: Waikato District
- Wards: Whaingaroa General Ward; Tai Runga Takiwaa Maaori Ward
- Community Board: Raglan Community Board
- Electorates: Taranaki-King Country; Hauraki-Waikato (Māori)

Government
  - Territorial Authority: Waikato District Council
  - Regional council: Waikato Regional Council
  - Mayor of Waikato: Aksel Bech
  - Taranaki-King Country MP: Barbara Kuriger
  - Hauraki-Waikato MP: Hana-Rawhiti Maipi-Clarke

Population (2023)
  - Total: 138
- Time zone: UTC+12 (NZST)
  - Summer (DST): UTC+13 (NZDT)
- Postal code: 3296

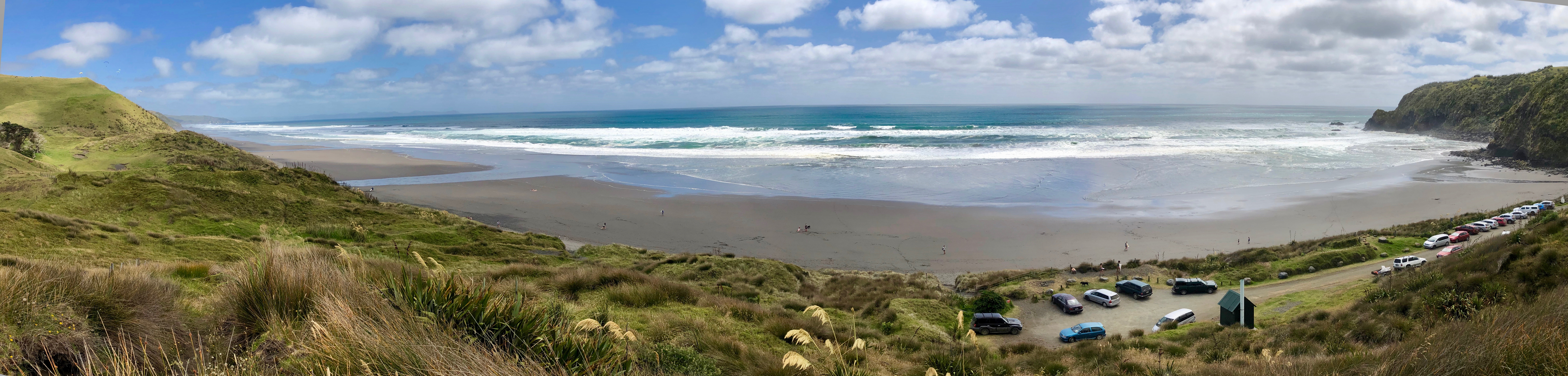
Ruapuke Papanui Pt and Swann Access Rd carpark

Ruapuke is a small farming community (predominantly sheep and cattle farmers) in the Waikato region on the slopes of Karioi, between Raglan and Kawhia in New Zealand.

== History ==
The introduction to 'Ruapuke' says, "The greater part of the Ruapuke District is of a sandy loam, and at one time carried a large population of Maoris, as is evidenced by old pas, great heaps of shells, warehouse sites and numerous kumara storage pits. When the first Europeans arrived the sandy country was covered with patches of light bush, with a big proportion of Karaka, Pūriri, and Cabbage trees. The balance was covered with Tauhinu, Teatree, Flax and Fern. The clay portion of the district, (inland and on the slopes of Mt Karioi) was in heavy bush." The archaeological map shows over 40 sites in the area. The European settlers, George Charlton and his sons-in-law, Captains Swann and Liddell, arrived in the 1850s. [1]

The 4,413 acres (1,786 ha) Ruapuke block was bought by the government from Ngāti Whakamarurangi between 1854 and 1856 for £300. A Waitangi Tribunal report says, "McLean appears to have applied pressure on Māori sellers to induce them to accept a price they had previously rejected . . . We find that, in this way, the Crown failed to act honourably and in good faith".

Ruapuke had a school from 1877 till 1954. The school was rebuilt in 1937. It has been replaced by a school bus.

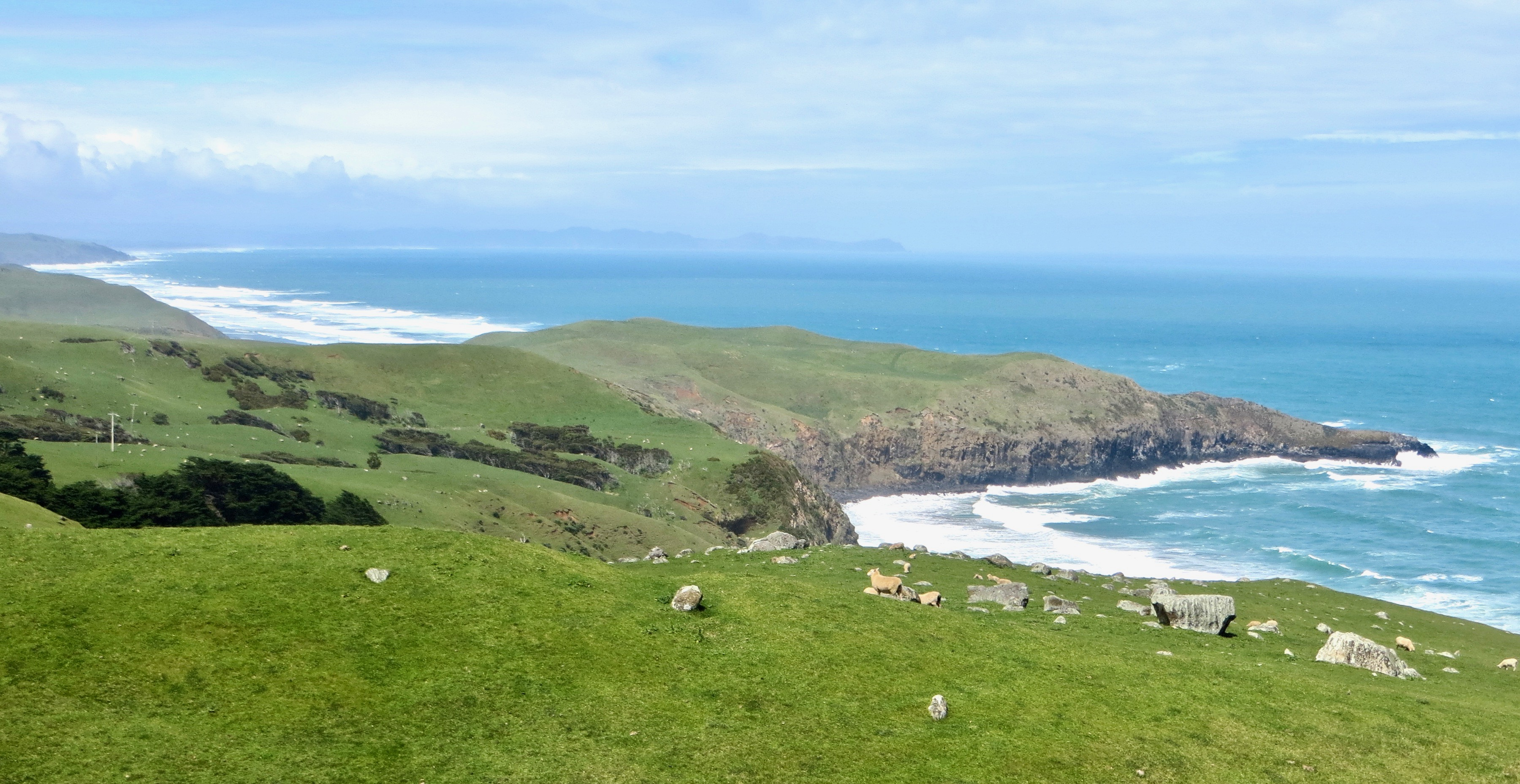
Papanui Point, with Ruapuke beach to the south

There was a store at Motakotako from the 1860s. From about 1875 to 1883 it was run by John William Ellis, who later founded Ellis & Burnand. Another store opened briefly in the 1890s.

From 1873 until the 1900s there were up to three flaxmills running.

== Demographics ==
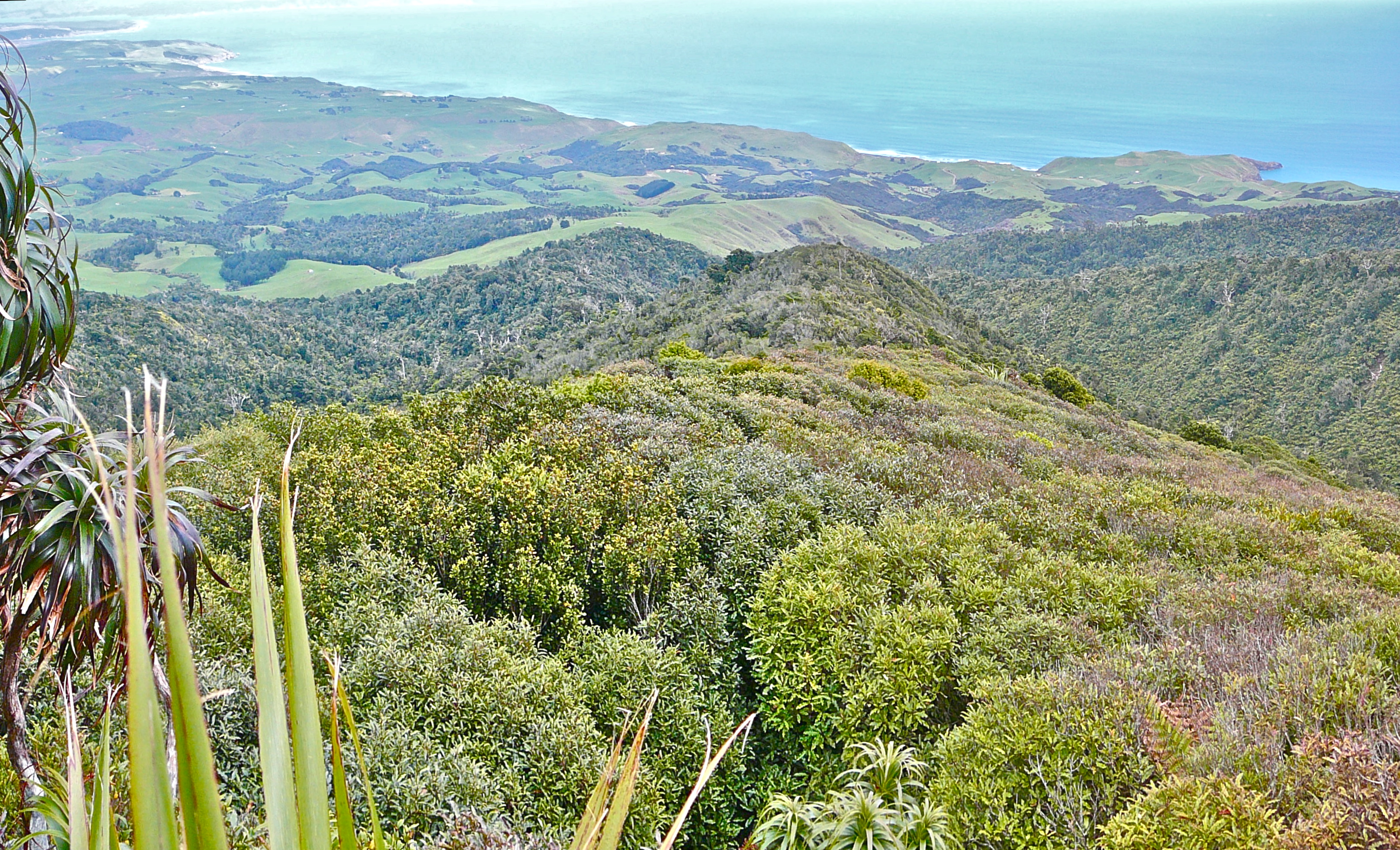
Ruapuke from Karioi summit.

The area north of Ruapuke Beach Rd is in meshblock 0861502 (N) and south of it in 0861800 (S). They had these census figures -

	Population			Households			Median age		Average income		National average
Year	N	S	total	N	S	total	N	S	N	S	
2001	60	57	117	24	15	39	39.5	37.5	$22,500	$12,500	$18,500
2006	39	69	108	18	21	49	40	34	$28,300	$15,400	$24,100
2013	54	60	114	27	24	51	43.8	41.5	$32,500	$20,800	$27,900
2018	66	69	135								
2023	63	75	138								

== Roads ==
Ruapuke is about 12 km (7.5 mi) from Te Mata. 840 m (0.52 mi) of Ruapuke Road was sealed and some bends removed in 2011. It is often used for rally car competitions.

The north end of Ruapuke Beach is about 23 km (14 mi) from Raglan via Whaanga Road and Te Toto Gorge, which is gravel, winding, mountainous and described as 'iconic' in descriptions of Rally New Zealand.

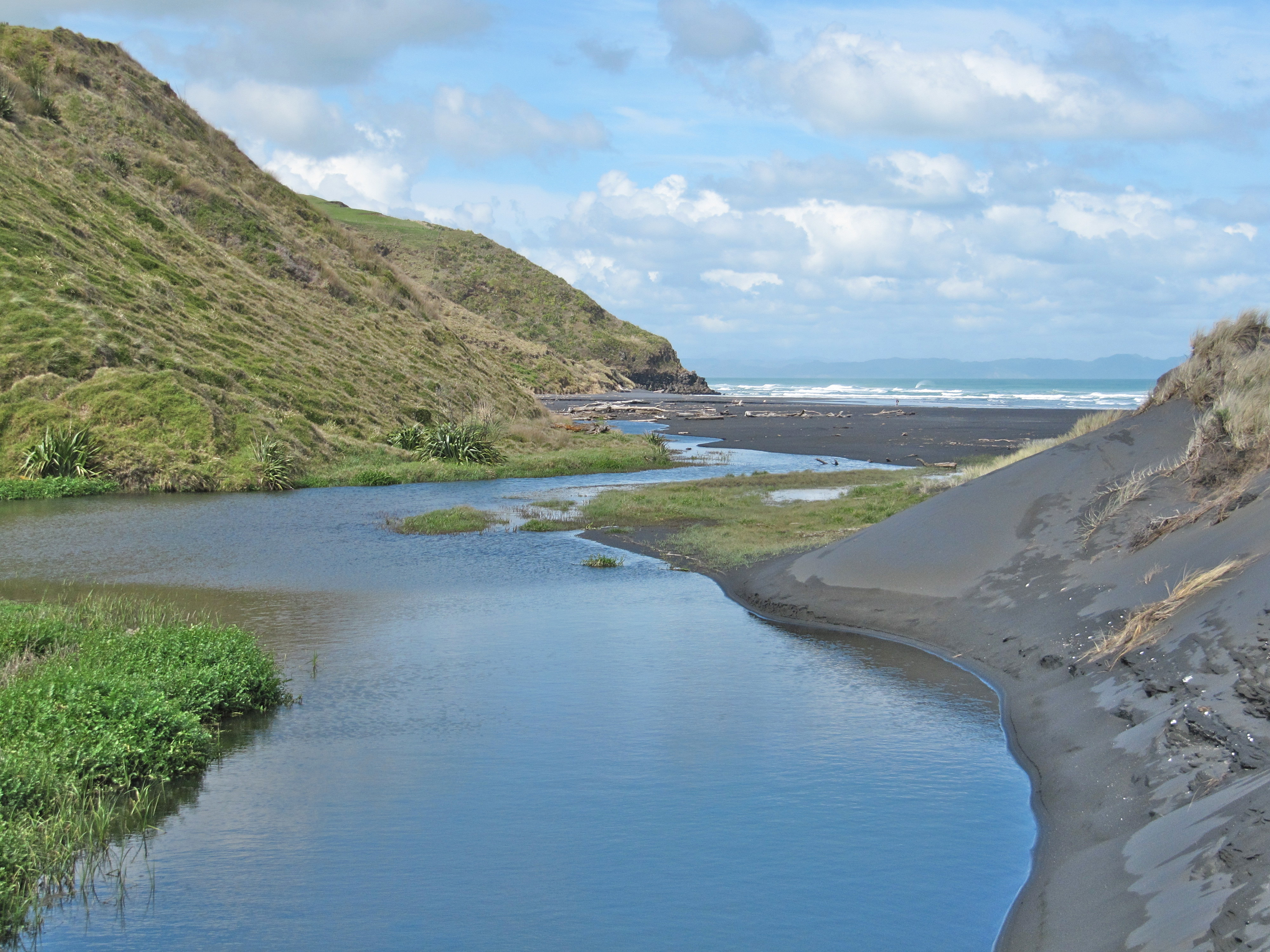
Ruapuke Stream enters the Tasman Sea through the sand dunes

=== Roading History ===
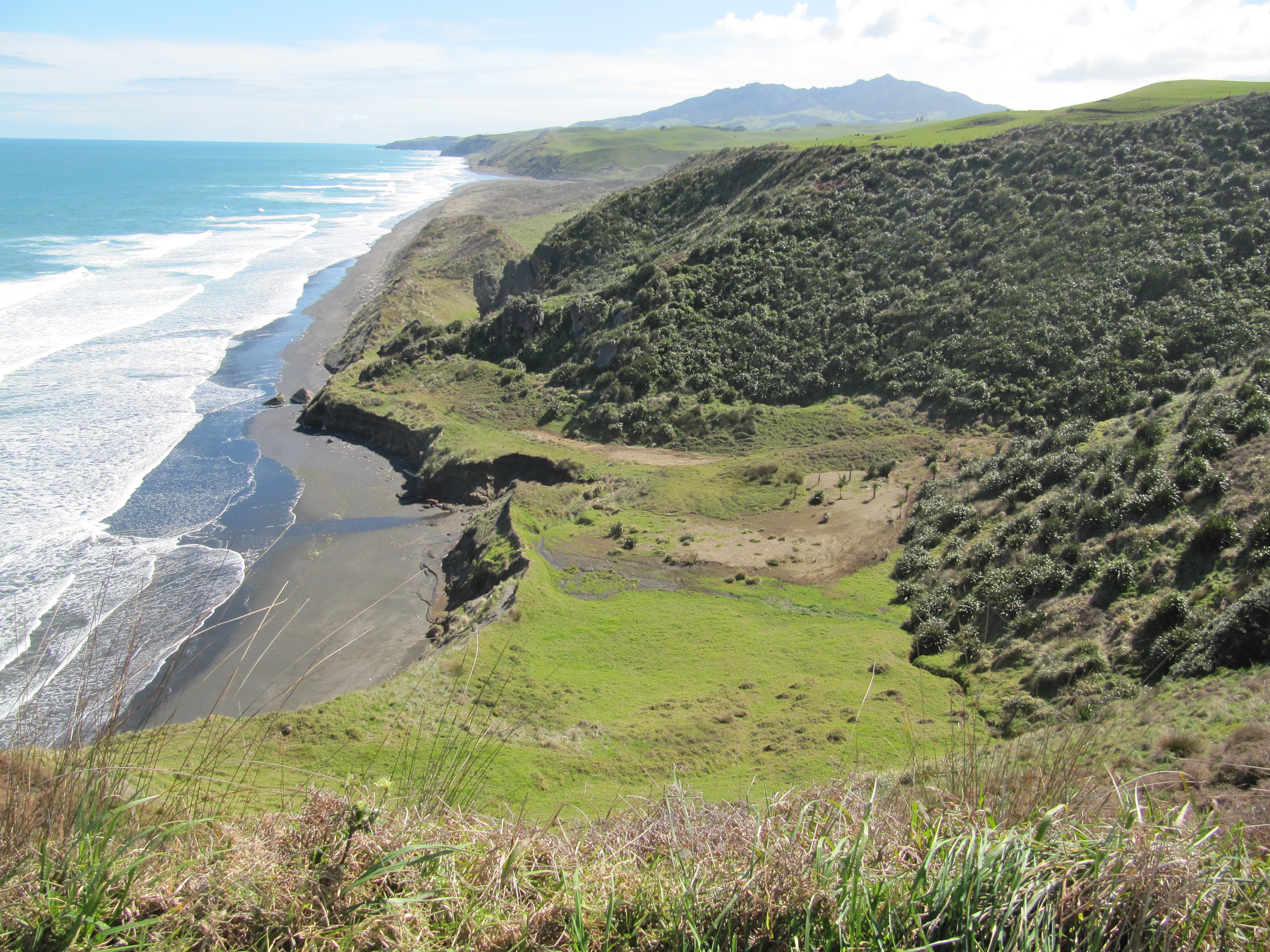
Ruapuke Beach from above Waiau Beach

Until 1864 settlement was along the coast and relied on access by boat. Then a track was cut along what is now Waimaori Rd.

Ruapuke Rd (originally known as Ruapuke Mountain Rd) was built as a shorter route from 1902 and was metalled in 1935.

== Surfing ==
Until the 1990s the beach largely remained unknown, used by local residents and a few surfing and surfcasting fishing enthusiasts. Ruapuke beach is sometimes used as a backup beach for events such as the Billabong Pro Junior Series (2007), and the Backdoor Oceanbridge Manu Bay Pro (2019), due to conditions.
