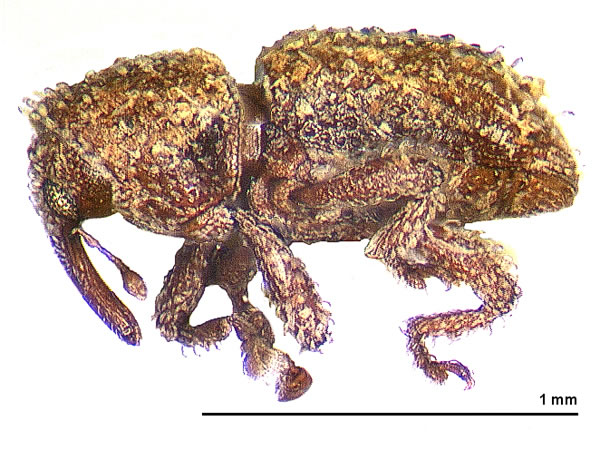
- Lateral view of Microcryptorhynchus kronei

Scientific classification
- Kingdom: Animalia
- Phylum: Arthropoda
- Class: Insecta
- Order: Coleoptera
- Suborder: Polyphaga
- Infraorder: Cucujiformia
- Family: Curculionidae
- Genus: Microcryptorhynchus; A.M. Lea, 1908

= Microcryptorhynchus =

Genus of insects

Microcryptorhynchus is a genus of weevils in the family Curculionidae.

== Species ==
- Microcryptorhynchus abditiceps
- Microcryptorhynchus abnormis
- Microcryptorhynchus albistrigalis
- Microcryptorhynchus ambiguus
- Microcryptorhynchus andersoni
- Microcryptorhynchus angustatus
- Microcryptorhynchus angustior
- Microcryptorhynchus ater
- Microcryptorhynchus basipennis
- Microcryptorhynchus bicolor
- Microcryptorhynchus brevis
- Microcryptorhynchus caledonicus
- Microcryptorhynchus carinatus
- Microcryptorhynchus caudatus
- Microcryptorhynchus chaetectetoroides
- Microcryptorhynchus cheesmanae
- Microcryptorhynchus confinis
- Microcryptorhynchus convexus
- Microcryptorhynchus cookei
- Microcryptorhynchus crinitus
- Microcryptorhynchus curtus
- Microcryptorhynchus curvus
- Microcryptorhynchus cylindricollis
- Microcryptorhynchus discretus
- Microcryptorhynchus echinatus
- Microcryptorhynchus evanescens
- Microcryptorhynchus exilis
- Microcryptorhynchus fasciatus
- Microcryptorhynchus fasciculatus
- Microcryptorhynchus fitchiae
- Microcryptorhynchus fosbergi
- Microcryptorhynchus foveaventris
- Microcryptorhynchus fraudator
- Microcryptorhynchus freycinetiae
- Microcryptorhynchus fulgidus
- Microcryptorhynchus glaber
- Microcryptorhynchus gracilis
- Microcryptorhynchus guamae
- Microcryptorhynchus hirtus
- Microcryptorhynchus howensis
- Microcryptorhynchus humeralis
- Microcryptorhynchus impressicollis
- Microcryptorhynchus impressus
- Microcryptorhynchus interruptus
- Microcryptorhynchus irregularis
- Microcryptorhynchus irroratus
- Microcryptorhynchus kondoi
- Microcryptorhynchus linagri
- Microcryptorhynchus lucens
- Microcryptorhynchus mangaoae
- Microcryptorhynchus mangareva
- Microcryptorhynchus mayae
- Microcryptorhynchus minutus
- Microcryptorhynchus modicus
- Microcryptorhynchus montevagus
- Microcryptorhynchus morongotae
- Microcryptorhynchus niger
- Microcryptorhynchus nitidus
- Microcryptorhynchus norfolcensis
- Microcryptorhynchus obesus
- Microcryptorhynchus oreas
- Microcryptorhynchus orientissimus
- Microcryptorhynchus orofenae
- Microcryptorhynchus paenulatus
- Microcryptorhynchus pallidus
- Microcryptorhynchus parvus
- Microcryptorhynchus perpusillus
- Microcryptorhynchus pervisus
- Microcryptorhynchus planatus
- Microcryptorhynchus praesetosus
- Microcryptorhynchus premnae
- Microcryptorhynchus proximus
- Microcryptorhynchus punctipennis
- Microcryptorhynchus pusillus
- Microcryptorhynchus pygmaeus
- Microcryptorhynchus quietus
- Microcryptorhynchus reticulatus
- Microcryptorhynchus rotundipennis
- Microcryptorhynchus rubellus
- Microcryptorhynchus rufimanus
- Microcryptorhynchus rufirostris
- Microcryptorhynchus ruivavaensis
- Microcryptorhynchus rurutuensis
- Microcryptorhynchus sanctijohni
- Microcryptorhynchus setifer

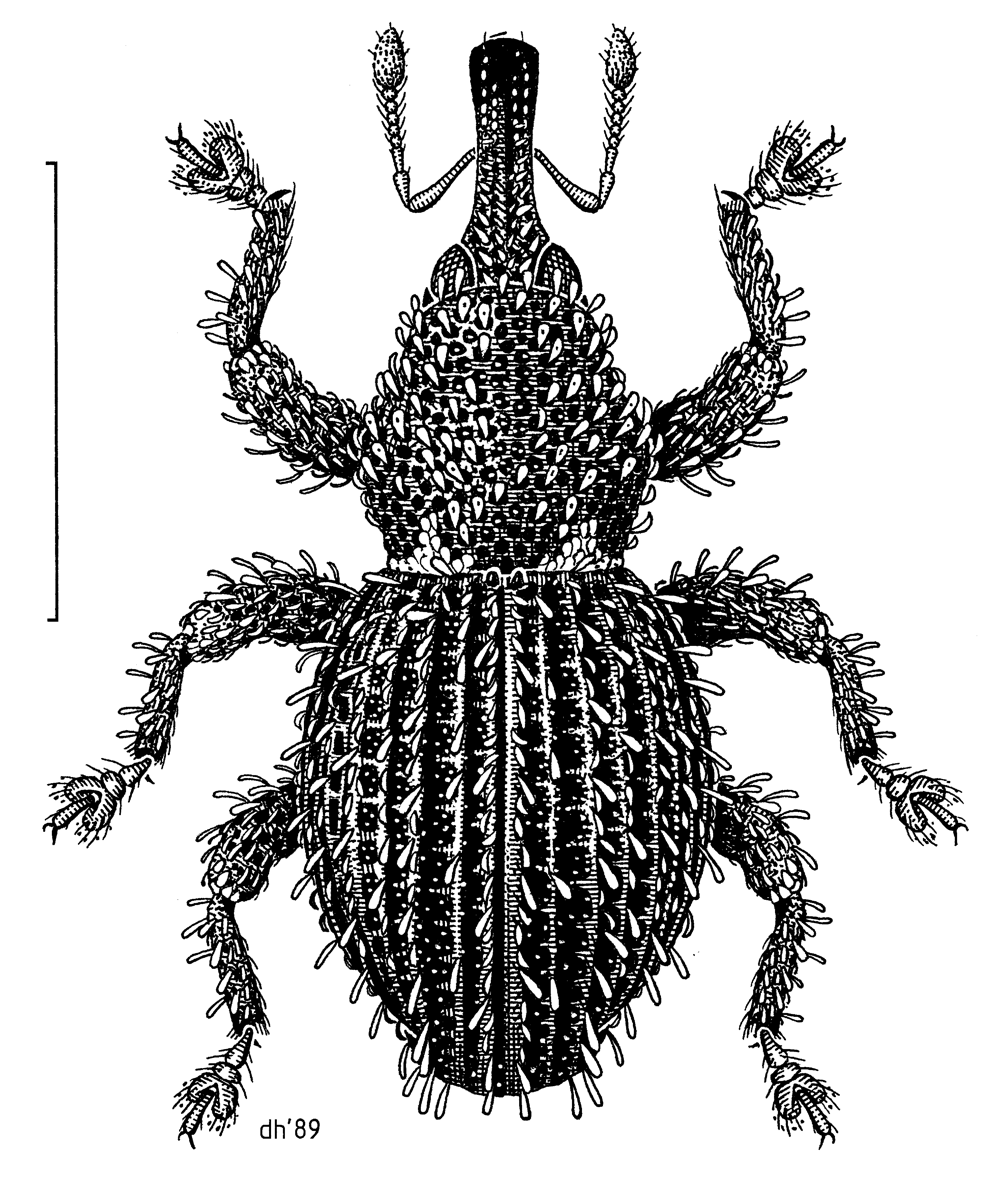
Microcryptorhynchus setifer

- Microcryptorhynchus setosus
- Microcryptorhynchus setulosus
- Microcryptorhynchus silvestris
- Microcryptorhynchus similis
- Microcryptorhynchus spathifer
- Microcryptorhynchus spinifer
- Microcryptorhynchus squamicollis
- Microcryptorhynchus squamosus
- Microcryptorhynchus sternalis
- Microcryptorhynchus superstes
- Microcryptorhynchus tahae
- Microcryptorhynchus tenuis
- Microcryptorhynchus testaceus
- Microcryptorhynchus thoracicus
- Microcryptorhynchus trukae
- Microcryptorhynchus tubuaiensis
- Microcryptorhynchus tumidus
- Microcryptorhynchus vagus
- Microcryptorhynchus varians
- Microcryptorhynchus ventralis
- Microcryptorhynchus vitiensis
- Microcryptorhynchus wilkesii
