= Auckland regional faults =

Known faults close to Auckland, New Zealand

- Map of faults in Auckland region. Definite active faults as defined in the GNS database are shown in red. Not all the other faults shown in (grey) are well characterised and Kenny et al. have tried to evaluate this. Well characterised fault segments are in dark grey. A number of faults characterised by sea floor studies off the west coast of North Island are not shown as reasonably accurate data does not appear to be in public domain. If you click on Map to enlarge it this enables mouse over of the fault names.
- Etymology: Auckland region
- Coordinates: 36°50′26″S 174°44′24″E
- Country: New Zealand
- Region: Waikato and South Auckland regions

Tectonics
- Plate: Indo-Australian
- Status: Quaternary fault
- Age: Miocene
- New Zealand geology database (includes faults)

The Auckland regional geologic faults have low seismic activity, compared to much of New Zealand, but do result in an earthquake risk to the Auckland metropolitan area, New Zealand's largest city. There is also evidence of past tectonic, volcanic associations in a city located within what is, at best, a very recently dormant Auckland volcanic field.

The only definite active fault in the Auckland Region, as defined geopolitically, is the Wairoa North Fault. However, there could be other possibly active faults within the Auckland region. These include the Drury Fault and the Firth of Thames Fault. Further, the adjacency of the Hauraki Rift to Auckland means that the active Kerepehi Fault with its risk of magnitude 7 or above events is relevant to seismic risk.

== General context ==
As much of Auckland is located upon two volcanic fields which have been active relatively recently in the geological timescale context, evidence of active faulting could be buried under volcanic deposits. A similar situation existed with recent sedimentary deposits in the Canterbury region of New Zealand, and meant the 2010 Canterbury earthquake and its significant 2011 Christchurch aftershock were unexpected. Accordingly, there have been recent attempts to better understand the multiple inactive faults which are associated with the landforms of the Auckland region.

== Geology ==
The basement rock structures in the Auckland region were deposited in the late Palaeozoic and early Mesozoic periods over a subduction zone adjacent to the Zealandia continental plate that was active in the late Jurassic to mid-Cretaceous. These now buried basements are characterised by the South Island where they remain as surface formations. To the west is a greywacke and argillite-dominated Murihiku Terrane found south of Waikato heads but buried by, for example, the volcanic rocks of the Waitākere Ranges in the Auckland region. To the east is the greywacke and argillite Waipapa (composite) Terrane found in the Hunua Ranges. In the center are the basement rocks associated with the Auckland section of the NNW trending Stokes Magnetic Anomaly known as the Dun Mountain–Maitai terrane made up largely of variably serpentinised ultramafic ophiolite but buried typically 300 m (980 ft) deep by miocene sediments or the volcanic rocks of the Auckland and South Auckland volcanic fields.

== North Auckland ==
The predominant inactive North-South faults in the west are the Muriwai–Helensville Fault, which leads into the faults that underlie the extinct volcanic remnants of the Waitākere Ranges. The vents of the volcanoes of the coastal aspects of the ranges are inferred to align with one such fault with low confidence. The broadly East-West fault structures of the Auckland region are initially defined by the southern faults of the Northland Allochthon, such as to the west the Rewhiti-Haupai Fault and to the east the Okura Thrust Fault. To the east, these continue until they reach the North-South aligned East Coast Bays Fault. The terminus of the southern portion of this fault is very close to the Tank Farm volcano. There are East-West sea floor faults south of the Whangaparāoa Peninsula, but the named faults here are North-South, such as the Weiti and Tindalls faults. Just off the end of the Whangaparāoa Peninsula and located on the sea floor between it and Tiritiri Matangi Island is the northern mapped end of the North-South trending Wanagaparoa Waikoopua North Fault. This fault may be important as it is now mapped to continue into the characterised Islington Bay Fault on the eastern flank of the Rangitoto volcano and onto the active Wairoa North Fault.

== Central Auckland ==
=== Waitākere Ranges ===
The Waitākere Ranges have a large number of known inactive faults. From their west, there are the North-South faults of the postulated Westcoast linement matching volcanoes as already noted, extending with a postulated fault line through the North Manakau Heads. The proven Hiui fault extends North – South up the valley of the dam and the ridge line as seen from the city, is related to the East Scenic Drive Fault, which has been characterised for over 23 miles. This last fault may continue to the south as the inferred Awaiti Fault.

=== Inferred Central Auckland Faults ===
The Cornwallis fault is largely inferred as the southern limit of the Waitākere Ranges being in the middle of the outlet of Manukau Harbour to the sea. Under the city proper, there is a large number of inferred faults with at least moderate confidence from the sampling data. Essentially, the volcanic rock overlay of the Auckland volcanic field hides surface confirmation, and few of the volcanic vents are directly over such postulated faults, although many are within 500 m (1,600 ft) of these. The first proven faults to the east are on Motutapu Island and the short Bucklands Fault which extend then into the proven faults of the Hunua Ranges as you go south.

== Hunua Ranges ==
The Hunua Ranges have significant North-South and East-West faults and extend from the Drury Fault to the Firth of Thames Fault which defines the eastern border of the Hauraki Rift. Much of the recent seismic activity in the Auckland region has been under the Hunua Ranges.

== Hauraki Plains ==
The largest amount of recent seismic activity in the Auckland region is associated with the western borders of the Hauraki Rift extending into the Hauraki Gulf where presumably faults exist. In the middle of the land portion of the rift, but outside the Auckland region, is the Kerepehi Fault in the Hauraki Plains. Because it has the potential to have earthquakes greater than magnitude 7 its presence dictates current building codes in the Auckland region.

== South Auckland ==
The predominant fault is the Drury Fault which trends NNW along the base of the Hunua Range foothills. It is associated with a range of old volcanoes to the west of Drury. Assessment in 2005 identified that the last rupture was about 45,000 years ago, with current slip rates in the range of 0.01 mm (0.00039 in) to 0.03 mm (0.0012 in) per year. Some of the recent seismic activity in Auckland has been close to the line of the Drury Fault and to its east. Accordingly there may be some seismic hazard. Moving towards the west from the Drury Fault in the north there are a fair number of mainly East – West orientated inferred subsurface faults. To the south in the area of the Bombay Hills and the Waikato River are a number of defined faults which do appear to have relationships with southern South Auckland volcanic field volcanoes. These include the Waikato Fault which is the most southern fault in the region, and to its north the Pukekoke, Aka Aka, St Stephens and Pokeno faults. There have been faults identified by seismic surveys off the west coast as part of oil exploration work.

== Tectonic volcanism ==
Map of faults and Quaternary volcanoes in Auckland region. To show well the volcanoes in relation to fault lines, you have to click on the map to enlarge and then zoom and pan. This also enables mouse over of the volcano and fault names. Definite active faults are shown in red. Well-characterised inactive fault segments are in dark grey, and other faults are shown in grey. A number of faults characterised by sea floor studies off the west coast of North Island are not shown. The type of volcanic eruption (some are composite) is indicated by basalt shield type eruption (black), scoria cone (red), or phreatomagmatic eruptions tuff ring (red-brown) and maar (purple). Volcanoes from both the Auckland volcanic field and South Auckland volcanic field are displayed. Miocene volcanoes are not shown although some of these have been used to predict fault alignments buried under volcanics, in particular the Westcoast linement fault.

A line of extinct Miocene volcanic vents is found on the west coast of the North Island as the western border of the Waitākere Ranges. A fault line called the Westcoast linement has been assigned with relatively low confidence to explain this alignment which is buried under the volcanic rocks associated with the former massive shield Waitākere volcano where the basement is almost 1 km (0.62 mi) or deeper. Some of the volcanoes of the more recent but also extinct Pleistocene South Auckland volcanic field and the currently dormant late Pleistocene and Holocene Auckland volcanic field are within 500 m (1,600 ft) of known fault lines. In the South Auckland volcanic field, the Drury Fault is in close alignment with the vents at Peach Hill, Bombay, Razor Back Road, and Belle Fleur, and other vents are within 500m. The Waikato Fault is just to the south and appears to have a relationship with at least 13 vents distributed on either side of it. The well-defined Pukekoke Fault has at least 5 vents nearby and perhaps 3 more in an apparent linear relationship to the characterised fault. The Hunua Falls vent is collocated with the still active Wairoa North Fault, which defines the eastern margin of the South Auckland volcanic field, but notably, its northern extensions – the Waikopua North Fault and Islington Bay Fault – define the eastern margin of the more recent Auckland volcanic field. It has been speculated that the Auckland volcanic field does not show as clear a fault-to-vent alignment as seen in many volcanic fields (this has been much studied) because the basement with the faults is overlaid by Waitamata sediments, with volcanic rocks often over this so that the initial exploitation of fault weakness by magma bodies is often diverted as the magma nears the surface to other nearby weakness. Certainly basement seems to be deeper than 350 m (1,150 ft) throughout the field.
