= South Auckland volcanic field =

Extinct volcanic field in New Zealand

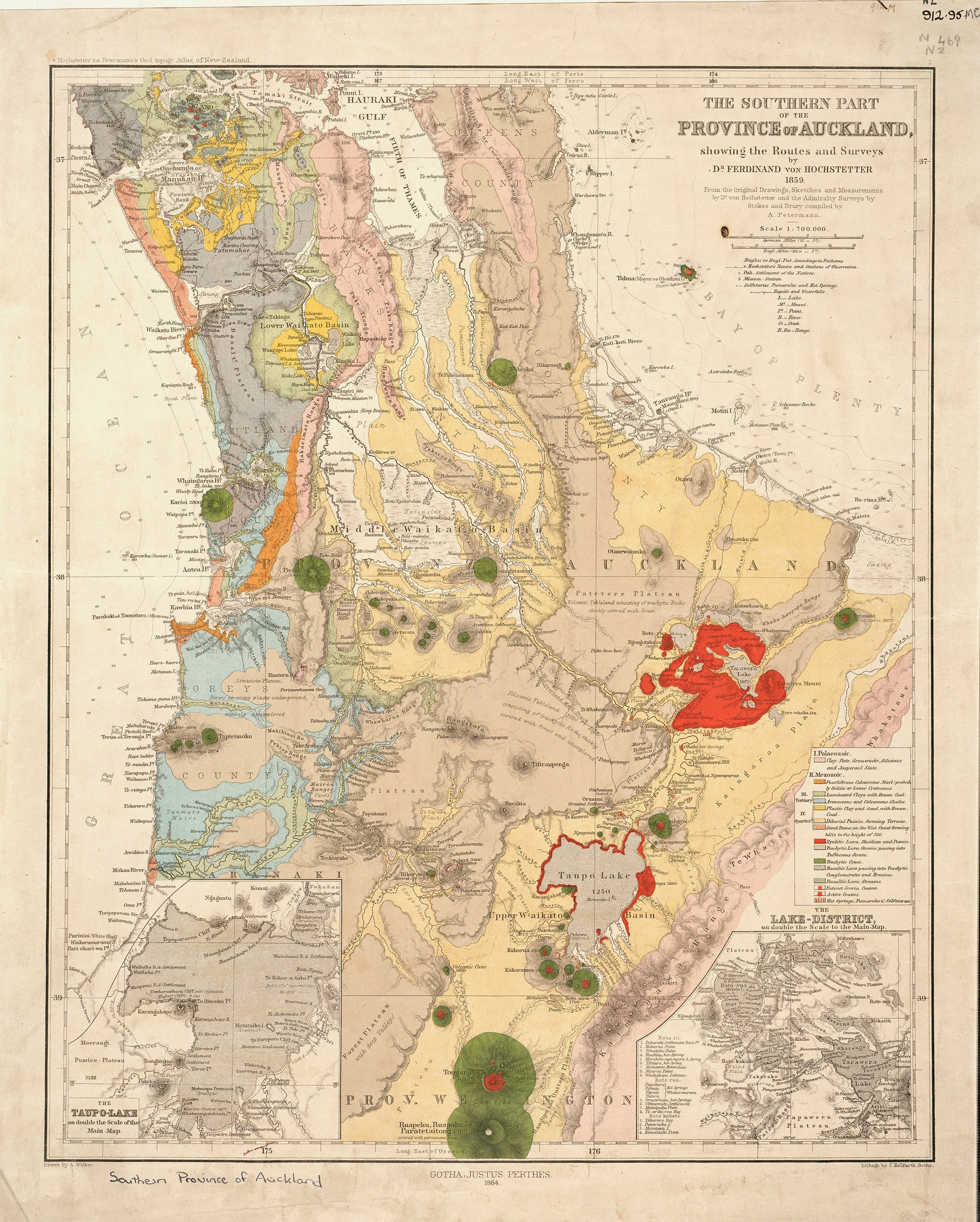
- Hochstetter 1859 geological map of the southern part of the then Auckland Province that recognised the basalt (gray-purple) of the South Auckland volcanic field but few of its volcanic features. The map also shows what is now the Waikato, and identifies other volcanic features of this part of the North Island.

Highest point
- Elevation: 379 m (1,243 ft)
- Coordinates: 37.195506°S 175.018135°E

Geography
- Location and extent of extinct South Auckland volcanic field

Geology
- Rock age: Pleistocene (1.48–0.55 Ma)
- Mountain type: Volcanic field
- Rock type: Basalt
- Last eruption: c. 550,000 years ago

The South Auckland volcanic field, also known as the Franklin Volcanic Field, is an area of extinct monogenetic volcanoes around Pukekohe, the Franklin area and north-western Waikato, south of the Auckland volcanic field. The field contains at least 82 volcanoes, which erupted between 550,000 and 1,600,000 years ago.

== Features ==
The field extends from Pukekiwiriki east of Papakura in the north and Pukekawa in the south. The field contains at least 82 volcanoes, and is older than the Auckland volcanic field to the north. The youngest volcanoes are likely the Bombay Hills shield volcano, which erupted an estimated 600,000 years ago, and Pukekohe Hill, the largest shield volcano of the field, which erupted an estimated 550,000 years ago. The largest tuff ring in the field is Onewhero maar which is 2.7 km (1.7 mi) in diameter and was formed 880,000 years ago. The field can be divided into three broad geographic areas: the north-eastern section, which consists of eroded remnants of lava flows and scoria cones, some of which are found in the south-western Hunua Ranges, the southern section to the south of the Waikato River, which features many of the more recent and better preserved scoria cones, and the central section, which forms much of the low-lying land of the Pukekohe area, between the Manukau Harbour and Waikato River.

== Context ==
=== Relations to other volcanic activity ===
Other basaltic volcanic fields that are also now thought to represent intraplate volcanism active in the Pleistocene are adjacent from the south in a more recent to the north trend. As already mentioned the younger Auckland volcanic field is to its immediate north. To the south west is the older Ngatutura volcanic field which was active between 1,830,000 and 1,540,000 years ago and these locations fit with the south north trend being related to the opening of the Hauraki Rift in the Miocene or fracturing of the lithosphere. Further south is the Alexandra Volcanic Group. To its west, are the even older volcanoes associated with the Northland-Mohakatino volcanic belt (Mohakatino Volcanic Arc) which are of a subduction-related origin but which include the still active Mount Taranaki at the southern end of this belt. To the south and east, visible on the horizon from the Bombay Hills are back arc volcanoes. These include the volcanoes of the Taupō Volcanic Zone to the south which have now been continuously active for over 2 million years. This was also the time that activity ceased in the extinct volcanoes of the Coromandel Peninsula in the Coromandel Volcanic Zone to the east.

=== Tectonics ===
Many of the volcanoes are related to known fault structures as shown on a map on this page. The Auckland region lies within the Australian Plate, about 400 kilometres (250 mi) west of its plate boundary with the Pacific Plate. The volcanoes are located south of the Auckland volcanic field which is also part of what has been termed the Auckland Volcanic Province. The structure of the Auckland regional faults and the resulting fault blocks is complex but like the volcanic field their locations can be postulated to be related to gravitational variations and where the Stokes Magnetic Anomaly passes through this section of the North Island.

A north south line of central volcanoes is orientated along the Drury Fault. These extend from Papakura through and beyound the Bombay Hills. While the western margin of the belt is defined by the north-south Wairoa North Fault the eastern margins have at least three east-west fault lines. The unnamed most northern of these was presumably followed by the basaltic extrusion that extended all the way to the Morley Road tuff rings. The volcanoes along the lines of the Waiuku Fault and to the south the Waikato Fault that is also followed by the mouth of the Waikato River suggest that there has been strong volcano-tectonic relationships during the fields historic eruption activity.

== Identification ==
The volcanic nature of the Tuakau and Pukekohe areas was first identified by Ferdinand von Hochstetter in 1859, however the first volcanic cones only began to be identified in the mid-20th century.

== List of volcanoes ==
Volcanoes	Age (thousand years)	Height	Location (Coordinates)	Refs	Images
Aka Aka Tuff Ring (Kawaka)		38 metres (125 ft)	37.300063°S 174.791018°E		
Ararimu		234 metres (768 ft)	37.127977°S 175.039323°E		
Bald Hill Tuff Rings		147 metres (482 ft)	37.232076°S 174.802456°E		
Ballards Road		215 metres (705 ft)	37.224438°S 174.803753°E		
Barriball Road Cone	1,000 ka	109 metres (358 ft)	37.224691°S 174.804062°E		
Beaver Road Vent		172 metres (564 ft)	37.212489°S 174.993759°E		
Bellemys		235 metres (771 ft)	37.127475°S 175.019926°E		
Belle Fleur		172 metres (564 ft)	37.210712°S 175.003093°E		
Bluff Road Vent		140 metres (460 ft)	37.259477°S 175.012179°E		Background landscape near Bluff Road Vent, south of the Synlait factory, Pōkeno
Bombay Cones	600 ka	331 metres (1,086 ft)	37.187134°S 175.003491°E		The Bombay Cones are in the center of this view from Mount Puketutu towards the northwest.
Buckland Vent		59 metres (194 ft)	37.229689°S 174.951236°E		
Dominion Road Tuff Ring		109 metres (358 ft)	37.255434°S 174.983169°E		
Douglas Road Vent (Pollock Rd shield volcano)		100 metres (330 ft)	37.218403°S 174.867973°E		
Drury Hills		246 metres (807 ft)	37.114020°S 174.992493°E		
Elbow Tuff Rings		27 metres (89 ft)	37.284566°S 174.830979°E		
Fitzgerald Road Vent		40 metres (130 ft)	37.113094°S 174.966521°E		
Glass Cone and Kellyville Tuff Ring	1,480 ka	111 metres (364 ft)	37.275108°S 175.055291°E		
Helenslee Road Tuff Ring		116 metres (381 ft)	37.238645°S 175.002524°E		
Helvetia Tuff Ring			37.193°S 174.873°E		
Hill Road Tuff Ring		3 metres (9.8 ft)	37.259763°S 174.824803°E		
Hunua Falls			37.068465°S 175.089933°E		Hunua Falls volcano is to the west (left) of the waterfall in this picture
Ingram Road Tuff Rings		80 metres (260 ft)	37.167623°S 174.963546°E		
Jerico Road Vent		148 metres (486 ft)	37.200509°S 174.956651°E		
Kauri Road Vent		251 metres (823 ft)	37.346941°S 174.903813°E		
Klondike Cone		251 metres (823 ft)	37.338347°S 174.908968°E		
Mangatawhiri Cone		42 metres (138 ft)	37.196538°S 175.098003°E		
Mangatawhiri Tuff Ring		42 metres (138 ft)	37.209678°S 175.089867°E		
Mauku Vent		97 metres (318 ft)	37.200256°S 174.836130°E		
Maxted Road Cone		80 metres (260 ft)	37.160775°S 174.9995420°E		
Mile Bush Hill		226 metres (741 ft)	37.318996°S 174.993556°E		
Morely Road Tuff Rings		147 metres (482 ft)	37.221467°S 174.776110°E		
Mount Calm		236 metres (774 ft)	37.085180°S 175.007218°E		
Onepoto (not to be confused with volcano of same name in Auckland volcanic field)		129 metres (423 ft)	37.288833°S 174.884917°E		
Onewhero Maar and Tuff Ring	880 ka	194 metres (636 ft)	37.319393°S 174.901320°E		
Otau		212 metres (696 ft)	37.122826°S 175.098353°E		
Paerata Tuff Ring North			37.158°S 174.908°E		
Paerata Tuff Ring South			37.167°S 174.920°E		
Pakau Stream Vent		16 metres (52 ft)	37.339775°S 174.784045°E		
Paparata Cone		319 metres (1,047 ft)	37.180618°S 175.062109°E		
Parker Lane Tuff Ring		10 metres (33 ft)	37.255202°S 174.896489°E		
Peach Hill		144 metres (472 ft)	37.137893°S 174.988631°E		
Pinnacle Hill		252 metres (827 ft)	37.198°S 175.049°E		
Pinnacle Hill Road Cone 2		230 metres (750 ft)	37.190920°S 175.051774°E		
Pinnacle Hill Road Cone 3		290 metres (950 ft)	37.183158°S 175.048511°E		
Pōkeno Cone		230 metres (750 ft)	37.21895°S 175.018420°E		
Pōkeno West Tuff Ring		111 metres (364 ft)	37.252038°S 175.031749°E		
Ponga Road		292 metres (958 ft)	37.099463°S 174.997315°E		
Pukekawa		277 metres (909 ft)	37.335067°S 174.982017°E		
Pukekawa Tuff Ring		114 metres (374 ft)	37.305464°S 174.979248°E		
Pukekiwiriki (Red Hill) - not to be confused with Pukewairiki		210 metres (690 ft)	37.064002°S 175.000366°E		
Pukekohe North Tuff Ring			37.176°S 174.902°E		
Pukekohe East Explosion Crater	680 ka		37.192°S 174.942°E		
Pukekohe East		147 metres (482 ft)	37.192402°S 174.9426098°E		
Pukekohe Hill	550 ka	222 metres (728 ft)	37.228917°S 174.893246°E		Pukekohe Hill in about 1912
Puketutu		379 metres (1,243 ft)	37.195386°S 175.022268°E		
Pukeotahinga		301 metres (988 ft)	37.335701°S 174.858921°E		
Puni Domain Shield Volcano			37.230°S 174.872°E		
Rangipokia Tuff Ring		10 metres (33 ft)	37.255031°S 174.878358°E		
Raventhorne Maar		80 metres (260 ft)	37.167953°S 174.978282°E		
Razor Back Road Cone		172 metres (564 ft)	37.197782°S 174.999437°E		
Red Crater		59 metres (194 ft)	37.217003°S 174.946902°E		
Ridge Road Tuff Ring		116 metres (381 ft)	37.225879°S 174.989692°E		
River View Road Vent		130 metres (430 ft)	37.252486°S 174.850079°E		
Roberts Road Vent		110 metres (360 ft)	37.288912°S 174.954860°E		
Rooseville Tuff Ring North			37.192°S 174.917°E		
Rooseville Tuff Ring South			37.199°S 174.926°E		
Rasumussen Road Tuff Ring		60 metres (200 ft)	37.245683°S 174.795200°E		
Rutherford Road Cone		172 metres (564 ft)	37.189554°S 174.959220°E		
Serpell Road Cone		230 metres (750 ft)	37.228208°S 175.054377°E		
Smeeds		186 metres (610 ft)	37.304488°S 174.988195°E		
Smeeds Quarry Road (Tuff Ring)		10 metres (33 ft)	37.285771°S 174.986278°E		
Sommerville Road Cone		100 metres (330 ft)	37.213628°S 174.791774°E		
Station Road Tuff Ring		54 metres (177 ft)	37.212282°S 174.799945°E		
Tauranganu		228 metres (748 ft)	37.342163°S 174.809535°E		
Te Kohanga Tuff Ring			37.309673°S 174.834508°E		
Tikorangi		122 metres (400 ft)	37.30785°S 174.849652°E		
Totara		335 metres (1,099 ft)	37.161564°S 175.022577°E		
Tuakau Vent		122 metres (400 ft)	37.265248°S 174.934825°E		
Waiuku Vent		111 metres (364 ft)	37.252192°S 174.769786°E		
Waiuku Parastic Vent		45 metres (148 ft)	37.269380°S 174.758521°E		
Whangarata Vent		160 metres (520 ft)	37.276726°S 174.972493°E		

Map of faults and Quaternary volcanoes in Auckland region. To show well the volcanoes in relation to fault lines you have to click on the map to enlarge and then zoom and pan. This also enables mouse over of the volcano and fault names. Definite active faults are shown in red. Well characterised inactive fault segments are in dark grey and other faults are shown in grey. A number of faults characterised by sea floor studies off the west coast of North Island are not shown. The type of volcanic eruption (some are composite) is indicated by basalt shield type eruption (black), scoria cone (red), or phreatomagmatic eruptions tuff ring (red-brown) and maar (purple). Volcanoes from both the Auckland volcanic field and South Auckland volcanic field are displayed. Miocene volcanoes are not shown.

Map of selected volcanic features of the South Auckland volcanic field, allowing wider context. Clicking on the map enlarges it, and enables panning and mouseover of volcano name/wikilink and ages before present. The type of volcanic eruption (some are composite) is indicated by basalt shield type eruption (black), scoria cone (red), or phreatomagmatic eruptions tuff ring (red-brown) and maar (purple). Dark brown shows basalt lava and deposit fields. The key to the other volcanics that are shown with panning is basalt - brown, monogenetic basalts - dark brown, undifferentiated basalts of the Tangihua Complex in Northland Allochthon - light brown, arc basalts - deep orange brown, arc ring basalts -orange brown, dacite - purple, andesite - red, basaltic andesite`- light red), rhyolite - violet, ignimbrite (lighter shades of violet), and plutonic - gray.

== See also ==
- List of volcanic fields
