= 1835 Auckland earthquake =

1835 Earthquake in Auckland, New Zealand

- Location within Auckland Location within New Zealand
- Local date: 1 January 1835
- Local time: 11:39
- Duration: 10 to 30 seconds
- Magnitude: 6.5 M_{w}
- Depth: 25 km (16 mi)
- Epicentre: 37°S 175°E
- Type: Normal
- Areas affected: Auckland, Waikato
- Total damage: Possibly Severe
- Max. intensity: MMI VIII (Severe)
- Tsunami: No
- Aftershocks: Many (Possibly between magnitudes 2 and 5)
- Casualties: Unknown

The 1835 Auckland earthquake was a magnitude 6.5 earthquake that occurred on 1 January 1835 in the Auckland region of New Zealand. The earthquake was caused by movement along the Wairoa North Fault, which runs through the area. At the time, the settlement of Auckland was still quite small, and there are limited records of the specific damage caused by the earthquake. However, historical accounts suggest that the earthquake caused significant shaking and rumbling in the area, and it is possible that some buildings or structures may have been damaged or collapsed. Despite this, there are no records of major damage or casualties resulting from the earthquake. The 1835 Auckland earthquake remains an important event in the region's history, particularly as it highlights the seismic activity that can occur in the area due to the presence of faults such as the Wairoa North Fault.

== Earthquake ==
The earthquake shock was felt as far away as Kaitaia and New Plymouth. However, due to the lack of research and studies of this historical earthquake, the full impacts outside of the Auckland region are unknown.

=== Geology ===
The earthquake occurred on the Wairoa North Fault, a normal fault that runs on the western side of the Hunua Ranges. The epicentre of the earthquake was located on the Waikopua segment of the Wairoa North Fault. The northern part of the Wairoa North Fault is considered to be its own distinct fault line, with a high level of certainty. The Wairoa North Fault is additionally part of the Hauraki Rift, a rift that extends from the Taupō Rift all the way up towards the Hauraki Gulf.

=== Seismic intensity ===
It was rated as VI–VII on the Modified Mercalli intensity scale in the central regions of Auckland. However, in the area around the earthquake's epicentre, it was described as "severe," which would classify its intensity at VIII.

== See also ==
- Auckland volcanic field
- Hauraki Rift
- Kerepehi Fault
- List of earthquakes in New Zealand
- Wairoa North Fault
