= Pukekohe =

- Town
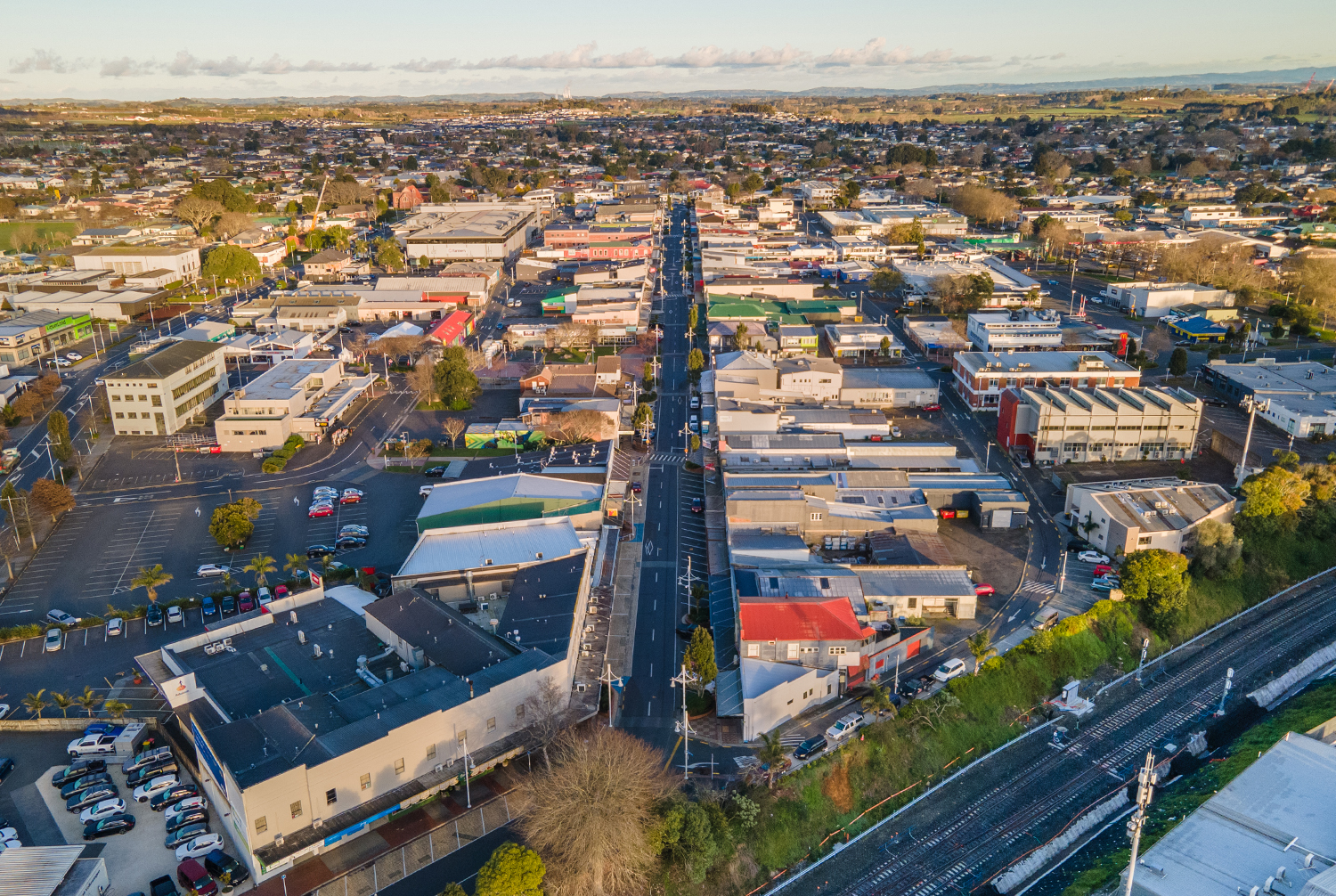
- Pukekohe CBD, as seen from above
- Interactive map of Pukekohe
- Coordinates: 37°12′S 174°54′E
- Country: New Zealand
- Region: Auckland Region
- Ward: Franklin ward
- Board: Franklin Local Board
- Electorates: Port Waikato; Hauraki-Waikato (Māori)

Government
  - Territorial authority: Auckland Council
  - Mayor of Auckland: Wayne Brown
  - Port Waikato MP: Matthew Paul
  - Hauraki-Waikato MP: Hana-Rawhiti Maipi-Clarke

Area
  - Town: 31.03 km^{2} (11.98 sq mi)

Population (June 2025)
  - Urban: 28,800
- Postcode: 2120
- Area code: 09

Pukekohe is a town in the Auckland Region of the North Island of New Zealand. The town is located at the southern edge of the Auckland Region, between the southern shore of the Manukau Harbour and the mouth of the Waikato River. The hills of Pukekohe and nearby Bombay Hills form the natural southern limit of the Auckland region. Pukekohe is located within the political boundaries of the Auckland Council, following the abolition of the Franklin District Council on 1 November 2010.

With a population of 28,800 (June 2025), Pukekohe is the 24th largest urban area in New Zealand, and the third largest in the Auckland Region behind Auckland itself and Hibiscus Coast.

== Geology ==
Pukekohe and the surrounding areas are a section of the South Auckland volcanic field, which erupted between 550,000 and 1,600,000 years ago.

== History ==
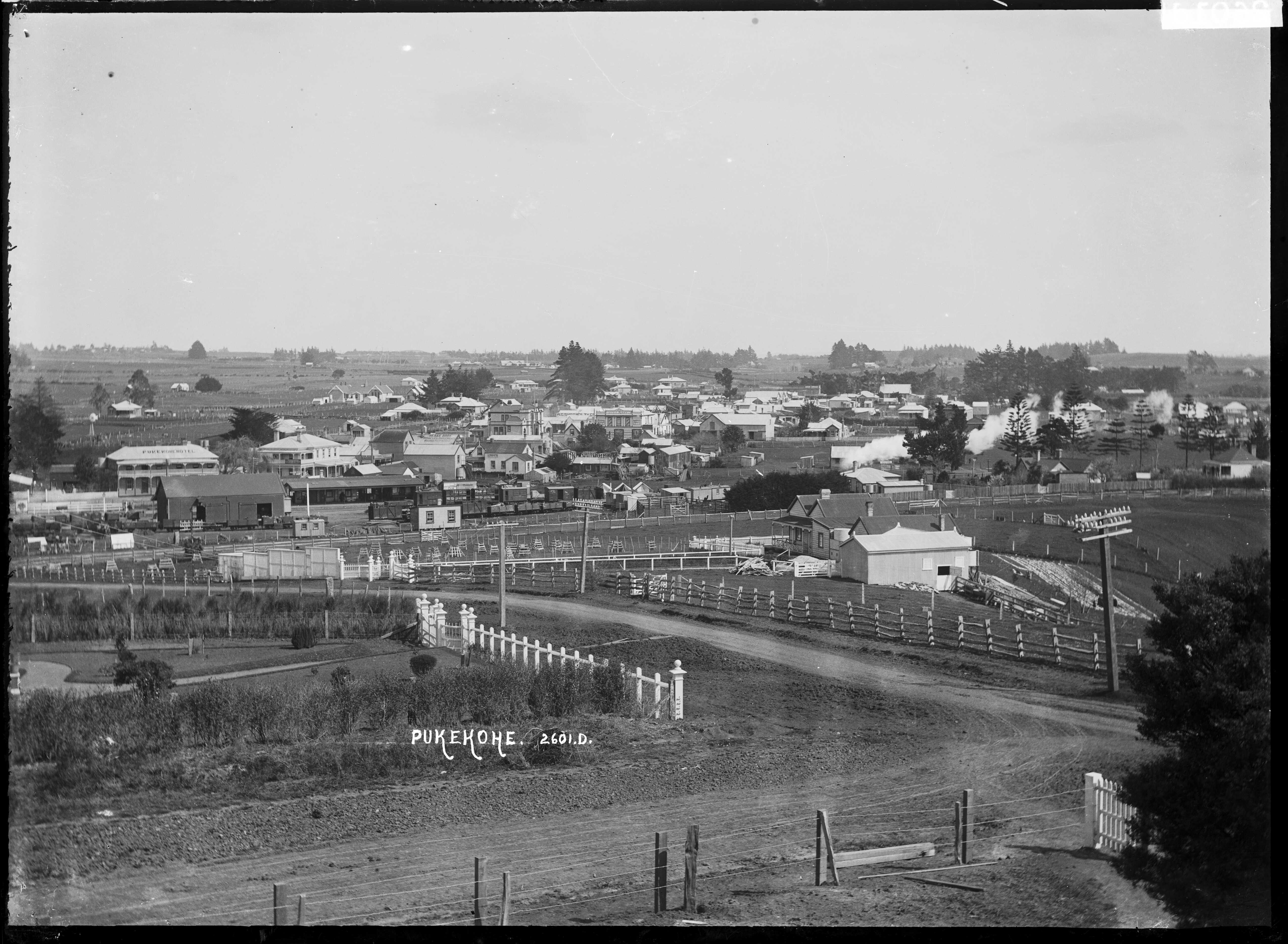
Pukekohe, c.1910

=== Māori history ===
Tāmaki Māori peoples settled the wider area in the 13th or 14th centuries. The traditional Māori name for Pukekohe Hill, Pukekohekohe ("Hill of Kohekohe") refers to Dysoxylum spectabile, also known as the New Zealand mahogany tree, which used to be a prominent part of the native bush on in the area. The area was important to Waiohua tribes including Ngāti Tamaoho, Ngāti Te Ata and Te Ākitai, due to the strategic views from the hill and the high quality soil. The northern slopes of the hill were home to some of the largest croplands (māra kai) for the Tāmaki Māori people who settled here.

Much of the population around Pukekohe migrated south during the Musket Wars in the 1820s due to the threat from Ngāpuhi and other northern tribes, gradually returning from the mid-1830s.

In modern times, the two main iwi of the area are Ngāti Tamaoho and Ngāti Te Ata. Waikato Tainui has a strong presence.

=== European settlement and the New Zealand Wars ===
The Crown purchased the Pukekohe block on 7 December 1843, for £150 in cash and £170 worth of goods (Note: 181 blankets, 30 coats, 3 tents, 18 saws, 16 blocks, 4 frying pans, a hammer, 11 shingling hammers, 788 lbs of tobacco, 2 bed gowns, an auger, 3 chisels, 5 planes, 9 gimlets, 290 lbs of mails, 6 pit saws, 7 crosscut saws, 7 handles, 7 handles with fasteners, 46 saw files, 13 pit saw files, a rough saw, a box of pipes, 3 iron pots, 2 saucepans, 2 tea kettles, 2 ovens, 13 axes, 20 tomahawks, 4 brushes, a horse brush, 4 pairs of shoes, a water pot, a compass, 8 spades, 6 jackets, 6 combs, 6 pairs of trousers, 6 silk handkerchiefs, 14 white shirts, 6 sou’westers, and 5 cartouche boxes.) The Crown established Te Awa nui o Taikehu, a reserve the Crown created for Te Ākitai Waiohua during land sales around modern-day Pukekohe. Some of this land was accidentally sold to settlers. The Crown would compensate the settlers and return land to local iwi. By 1856, European settlements had been well established in the north and western reaches of Pukekohe. On 9 July 1863, due to fears of the Māori King Movement, Governor George Grey proclaimed that all Māori living to the South of Auckland needed to swear loyalty to the Queen and give up their weapons. Most people refused due to strong links to Tainui, leaving for the south before the Government's Invasion of the Waikato. Small numbers of people remained, in order to tend to their farms and for ahi kā (land rights through continued occupation).

A major battle of the Waikato War was fought at Pukekohe East on 14 September 1863. The battle involved 11 armed settlers, who were converting the Pukekohe East church into a redoubt and approximately 200–300 Māori, mainly from the Waikato area. Although surprised and severely outnumbered, the settlers held off the Māori war party until troops from the 18th Royal Irish Regiment arrived. No settlers were killed or injured while 30 Māori were killed with an unknown number wounded. Six bodies were found near the church and 24 were later found buried in the bush. The church still exists today and the bullet holes are still visible. According to Te Huia Raureti, tribes that took part in the raid came from Ngāti Maniapoto, some other upper Waikato tribes, and Ngāti Pou of lower Waikato. On the eve of the raid on Pukekohe East, a war council had ordered members of the taua (war party) to avoid looting the property of settlers. Despite this order, future Ngāti Maniapoto chief Wahanui Huatare and several other members raided a settler's house. This angered other members of the war party, who regarded it as a bad omen. Nearly the entire Pukekohe area was abandoned apart from military outposts. Isolated attacks occurred as late as November 1863 after the Battle of Rangiriri.

The New Zealand Government confiscated large tracts of land in the aftermath of the invasion in 1865, after which the town of Pukekohe was established, on the northern slopes of its namesake, Pukekohe Hill. In January 1865, the New Zealand Government's Executive Council designated Pukekohe as one of the eight districts in the Waikato region to be confiscated, which amounted to a total of 577,590 acres. On 26 April 1865, the Native Land Court awarded £5,444 in compensation to the Ngatipari tribe, a branch of the Ākitai people, for a block of land known as the "Pukekohe Reserve" or "Pukekohe bloc," which had been confiscated during the Waikato War. The Ngatipari claimants successfully argued that they had not opposed the Crown during the Waikato War and established their claim to the land on the basis of cultivation and ancestral burial grounds.

Following the Waikato War the government wished to populate the area around Pukekohe. To do this they offered migrants from Britain and Cape Colony 10 and 5 acres respectively to settle in the area. Over 3,000 immigrants came from Britain and roughly 1,200 from Cape Colony. In 1864, about 1,000 Irish Protestants arrived in Pukekohe as part of a wave of Irish Protestant migrants settling in the North Island during the mid to late 19th century.

Due to the clearing of dense bush in the Pukekohe area, large areas of fertile, volcanic land became available for growing crops. While onions and potatoes were first grown in Pukekohe as early as the 1850s, large-scale market growing of vegetables did not begin until 1870 in nearby Patumahoe. After horticulturalist John Bilkey planted a successful crop of onions on Pukekohe Hill in 1892, local farmers began cultivating onion patches. The expansion of roads and railway infrastructure during the late 19th century led to the development of market gardens in Pukekohe and the nearby Bombay Hills. By 1875, Pukekohe was connected to Auckland by rail with the extension of railway lines to Mercer. This is when Pukekohe's population saw the largest growth. People who had lived in Te Awa nui o Taikehu returned to the area in the 1870s, often working as labourers in the market gardens on the former lands of the reserve. By 1885 Pukekohe had 145 farmers, all the expected professionals of a small town, and several businesses.

=== 20th century ===
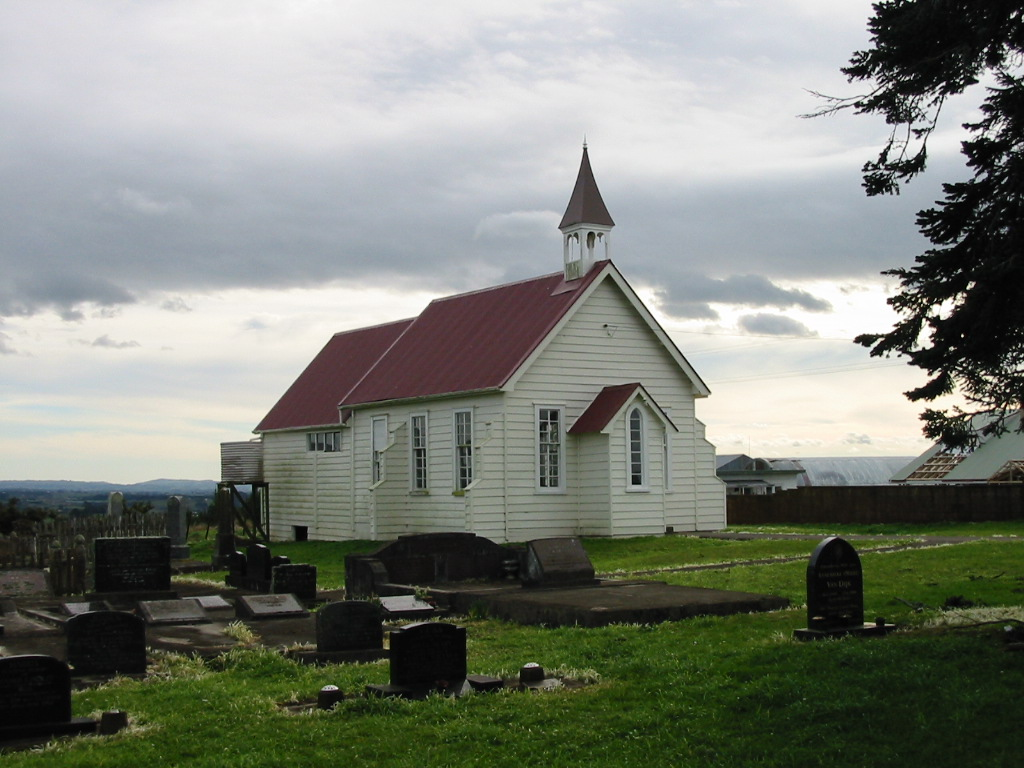
Pukekohe East Church

During the early 20th century, several landless Māori from the Waikato migrated to Pukekohe to work in the township's market gardens as itinerant agricultural workers. These Māori came from the Ngatipari, Ākitai, and Ngāpuhi iwi (tribes). Since the Māori in Pukekohe had no ancestral ties to the land, they took the symbolic title of rootless Māori and became known as Nga Hau E Wha (People of the Four Winds).

On 10 June 1905, Pukekohe became a town district. By 1907, Pukekohe's town centre consisted of one main street with numerous stores and workshops. Following the completion of the North Island Main Trunk railway line in 1907, Pukekohe's market gardens became a major supplier of agricultural produce for several North Island major population centres including Auckland and Wellington. Due to Auckland's growing population, Pukekohe became an important market gardening area for the Auckland Region. On 1 April 1912, Pukekohe became a borough with its own elected local council. Due to Auckland's growing population during the 19th and 20th centuries, Pukekohe became an important market gardening area for the Auckland Region. Mitha Unka, the first Indian settler, arrived in Pukekohe in 1918, and an Indian community developed in the town during the 1930s and 1940s. By July 1921, a beautifying society had been established in Pukekohe.

The growing presence of Chinese and Indian market growers in Pukekohe led to the creation of the White New Zealand League in December 1925. In 1932, 1,400 Pukekohe locals petitioned the New Zealand Parliament to repatriate local Chinese and Indians, who they claimed were taking jobs from Europeans and Māori. Parliament dismissed the petition in 1934 on the grounds that the petition's allegations had not been proved. Local Indians also formed the Pukekohe Indian Association.

During the 1930s, another wave of Māori rural-to-urban migration occurred in the Auckland Region including Pukekohe. Many Māori migrating to Pukekohe and Auckland found it difficult to secure housing due to discrimination from landlords, with many experiencing substandard housing. On 15 July 1935, the Franklin Times reported that the poor living conditions of Maori in Pukekohe contributed to a high Maori child mortality rate, with the newspaper estimating an upward of 20 dying. The Pukekohe council later petitioned the New Zealand government to address the substandard living conditions of Māori market garden workers and their families. During the early 1940s, the Department of Māori Affairs launched a scheme to build houses for Māori workers and their families. However, the project was aborted when the Pukekohe council object to Māori living within the town's boundaries.

Between 1942 and 1944, Pukekohe hosted US Marines, US Army and US Navy personnel serving in the Pacific theatre of World War Two. During World War Two, the public mobilisation for the war effort led to the emergence of girls' marching clubs and a Boy's Brigade company. Pukekohe also hosted the annual Franklin Caledonian Society's sports day in February 1945.

In 1952, the Māori Women's Welfare League undertook a house-to-house survey of living conditions in Pukekohe, where Māori worked as agricultural works on the market gardens and lived in substandard shacks provided by their employers. The League submitted its report to the Auckland City Council, the Department of Māori Affairs, and the State Advances Corporation. Despite the League's lobbying, many Māori continued to face substandard living conditions and long waits for state rental housing. Until the 1950s, many Māori children in Pukekohe died from poverty-related illnesses such as typhoid.

In 1952, the Department of Education established a segregated special Māori school in Pukekohe in response to strong local pressure from European residents who did not want their children to mix with Māori. This contradicted the department's policy of racially integrated schools. The visiting American psychologist David Ausubel regarded Pukekohe's segregated school as emblematic of an alleged "colour bar" in New Zealand where Māori faced negative stereotyping and discrimination in accessing housing, hotel accommodation, employment, and credit services.

In 1963, ethnic Chinese onion grower Rai Wai Ching contested a seat in the New Zealand Parliament to highlight racism in Pukekohe. At candidates' meetings, he complained that members of his community were not served in bars and were allocated inferior seats at the town's cinemas. Ching faced death threats and was given police protection. Though Ching's parliamentary bid was unsuccessful, the publicity led the town to end discrimination against non-Whites in hotels and cinemas.

== Culture ==
=== Marae ===
Ngā Hau e Whā Marae is located in the Pukekohe area. It is the tribal meeting grounds of Ngāti Tamaoho and the Waikato Tainui hapū of Ngāi Tai and Ngāti Tamaoho.

=== Indian community centres ===
In 1953, the Nehru Hall was constructed in Pukekohe for the Indian committee, and was the first Indian community hall to be built in New Zealand. The hall was too small to host large-scale events such as Indian weddings, which instead were held at the Pukekohe War Memorial Town Hall. In response to the community needing a larger space, the PIA Events Centre was opened by the Pukekohe Indian Association in 1999.

== Demographics ==
Between 1916 and 1936 Pukekohe saw a 65% growth compared to 42% for the rest of Franklin County. By 1936 it had 2536 residents with roughly 40% identifying as Anglican. The population went from 3,309 in 1945 to 6,547 in 1966 following the baby boom in the post war years. 31% of Pukekohe identified as Anglican by then but attendance was at an average of eight times per annum based on this number. In 1991 Pukekohe had a population of 10,410. In 2001 Pukekohe's population was 13,110.

Stats NZ describes Pukekohe as a medium urban area, which covers 31.03 km^{2} (11.98 sq mi). It had an estimated population of 28,800 as of June 2025, with a population density of 928 people per km^{2}.

Historical population
Year	Pop.	±% p.a.
2006	17,268	—
2013	20,460	+2.45%
2018	23,841	+3.11%
2023	27,042	+2.55%
The 2006 population is for a larger area of 32.50 km^{2}. Source:

Pukekohe had a population of 27,042 in the 2023 New Zealand census, an increase of 3,201 people (13.4%) since the 2018 census, and an increase of 6,582 people (32.2%) since the 2013 census. There were 13,107 males, 13,866 females and 72 people of other genders in 9,231 dwellings. 2.5% of people identified as LGBTIQ+. The median age was 36.2 years (compared with 38.1 years nationally). There were 5,868 people (21.7%) aged under 15 years, 4,998 (18.5%) aged 15 to 29, 11,748 (43.4%) aged 30 to 64, and 4,428 (16.4%) aged 65 or older.

People could identify as more than one ethnicity. The results were 65.3% European (Pākehā); 20.9% Māori; 11.0% Pasifika; 17.2% Asian; 1.4% Middle Eastern, Latin American and African New Zealanders (MELAA); and 2.0% other, which includes people giving their ethnicity as "New Zealander". English was spoken by 94.9%, Māori language by 4.0%, Samoan by 1.3%, and other languages by 17.8%. No language could be spoken by 2.4% (e.g. too young to talk). New Zealand Sign Language was known by 0.5%. The percentage of people born overseas was 28.3, compared with 28.8% nationally.

Religious affiliations were 34.7% Christian, 3.9% Hindu, 1.1% Islam, 1.8% Māori religious beliefs, 0.6% Buddhist, 0.3% New Age, 0.1% Jewish, and 3.8% other religions. People who answered that they had no religion were 46.8%, and 7.1% of people did not answer the census question.

Of those at least 15 years old, 4,023 (19.0%) people had a bachelor's or higher degree, 10,950 (51.7%) had a post-high school certificate or diploma, and 6,198 (29.3%) people exclusively held high school qualifications. The median income was $42,300, compared with $41,500 nationally. 2,502 people (11.8%) earned over $100,000 compared to 12.1% nationally. The employment status of those at least 15 was that 11,109 (52.5%) people were employed full-time, 2,433 (11.5%) were part-time, and 618 (2.9%) were unemployed.

Individual statistical areas
Name	Area (km^{2})	Population	Density (per km^{2})	Dwellings	Median age	Median income
Pukekohe North	3.90	1,977	507	690	36.2 years	$42,700
Pukekohe North West	0.88	2,943	3,344	939	30.2 years	$33,900
Anselmi Ridge	7.54	2,916	387	1,035	46.1 years	$39,400
Pukekohe West	1.25	4,407	3,526	1,392	31.7 years	$39,000
Pukekohe South West	1.01	2,907	2,878	876	31.8 years	$53,300
Cape Hill	0.72	1,536	2,133	504	36.4 years	$55,000
Rosa Birch Park	0.79	2,043	2,586	804	45.5 years	$37,300
Rooseville Park	1.35	2,517	1,874	882	37.2 years	$46,200
Cloverlea (Auckland)	1.31	2,586	1,974	951	43.3 years	$43,400
Pukekohe Central	3.10	318	103	132	39.9 years	$36,800
Pukekohe Hospital	0.73	1,656	2,268	612	42.8 years	$40,100
Buckland	8.46	1,233	146	414	39.4 years	$45,800
New Zealand					38.1 years	$41,500

== Local government ==
The Pukekohe Highway District was formed 20 June 1862. It split in 1872 into Pukekohe West and Pukekohe East. Pukekohe Town District was formed from Pukekohe West Road District in 1905 and in 1915 both Pukekohe East and Pukekohe West road districts were dissolved.

Pukekohe Town Board ran the Pukekohe Town District from 1905 to 1912, when Pukekohe became a borough. Pukekohe Borough Council continued until it was merged into Franklin District Council in 1989, eventually being amalgamated into Auckland Council in November 2010.

During its 77-year existence, Pukekohe Borough had eight mayors. The following is a complete list:

	Mayor	Portrait	Term of office	Notes
1	William Dunn		1912	
2	Charlie Lawrie		1912–1915	
3	Rex Mason		1915–1919	CMG in 1967
(2)	Charlie Lawrie		1919–1921	
4	John Routly		1921–1935	
(2)	Charlie Lawrie		1935–1938	
(4)	John Routly		1938–1941	
5	Max Grierson		1941–1950	OBE in 1978
6	Stan Childs		1950–1963	MBE in 1971
7	Colin Lawrie		1963–1974	QSM in 1976; son of Charlie Lawrie
8	Max Short		1974–1989	MBE in 1993

Since 2010, the Franklin Local Board represents local government in the area. The local board is one of 21 local boards across Auckland. The current Councillor is Andy Baker. Pukekohe lies in the Port Waikato general electorate, currently represented by Andrew Bayly of the National Party. It is part of the Hauraki-Waikato Māori electorate, currently represented by Hana-Rawhiti Maipi-Clarke of Te Pāti Māori.

== Education ==
Pukekohe High School is a secondary school (years 9–13) with a roll of 1,938. The school opened in 1921 as Pukekohe Technical High School, and was renamed to Pukekohe High School in 1948.

Pukekohe Intermediate School is an intermediate school (years 7–8) with a roll of 689. The school opened in 1966

Pukekohe East School, Pukekohe Hill School and Valley School are contributing primary schools (years 1–6) with rolls of 154, 542 and 463 students, respectively. Pukekohe East School opened in 1880. Pukekohe Maori School opened in 1952 and was renamed to Pukekohe Hill School in 1966. Valley School opened in 1966.

Pukekohe North School is a full primary school (years 1–8) with a roll of 347. 79 percent of the roll are of Māori heritage, and some classes are taught in the Māori language. The school opened in 1957, although the official opening was in 1958.

KingsGate School and St Joseph's School are state integrated schools with rolls of 286 and 340 students, respectively. KingsGate is an interdenominational Christian composite school (years 1–13). It opened in 1996. St Joseph's is a Catholic contributing primary school (years 1–6) which opened in 1923.

Parkside School is a special school with a roll of 176. It provides education for students with special needs up to the age of 21.

Tamaoho School is a contributing primary school which opened in 2021.

All these schools are coeducational. Rolls are as of July 2026.

== Sports ==
Pukekohe Park Raceway is a motorsports and horse-racing facility. Opened in 1963, this circuit is famous for having hosted the New Zealand Grand Prix 29 times between 1963 and 2000, as well as the V8 International (a round of the V8 Supercars championship) between 2001 and 2007. They returned in 2013–2019 after the series had a short-lived moved to a street race circuit in Hamilton for five years. The last and final race was held in 2022, Due to the track being closed by the Auckland Racing Club.

Pukekohe RFC represent the town in rugby union, their number 1 field is dubbed the 'Onion Patch'. The Counties Manukau Rugby Football Union are based in Pukekohe and play home matches at Navigation Homes Stadium. They have a men and women's premier team in each national championship. The "Steelers" in the men's competition and the "Heat" in the women's competition. The Men's team won the second division competition in 1979 and have won this division competition twice.

Pukekohe is home to Pukekohe AFC who are members of the Northern Region Football. Bledisloe Park Sports Centre (overlooking Bledisloe Park grounds) is home to both Pukekohe AFC and Pukekohe Metro Cricket Club. The sports centre is managed by the Bledisloe Park Society Committee.

Auckland Metropolitan Clay Target Club, is a clay target shooting club located just outside Pukekohe, offering recreational and competitive target shooting.

Puni Mountain Bike Track, located at Puni Memorial Park, has roughly 6–7 km of single-track. Sunset Coast BMX and Puni Rugby Club are also located at Puni Memorial Park.

From 2021 The New Zealand National Basketball League Franklin Bulls took to the court in Pukekohe. They play their home games at the Franklin Pool and Leisure Centre, also known as 'The Stockyard'.

The town has a golf club, tennis club, squash club and a hot rod club.

== Media ==
Based on King St, Pukekohe, Rural Living is a monthly, lifestyle magazine distributed throughout the Franklin region and accessible online. The magazine's publisher, Times Media, also produces annual magazines, Design & Build Franklin and Settling In, produced by locals for locals.

Franklin County News is the local newspaper distributed weekly to homes in Pukekohe and surrounding towns, including Waiuku and Tuakau.

The Post Newspaper issues almost 22,000 copies weekly on a Tuesday within Franklin and Tuakau and is based in Waiuku.

In 2015, the online events calendar and photo news Franklin Life NZ was launched.

In 2013, the film Mt. Zion was released in New Zealand, portraying Māori life in 1970s Pukekohe.

== Transport ==
Pukekohe railway station is on the North Island Main Trunk Railway and is the southernmost station of the Auckland rail network, at the end of the South City Line. In July 2017, it was announced that the purchase of battery-powered electric trains had been "agreed in principle" by Auckland Council and that an all-electric service would be operational in 2019 (provisionally, subject to conditions), four years after completion of the rest of the region's electrified rail network. However, the purchase of battery-powered trains did not proceed. In 2020, the government announced funding to extend electrification from Papakura to Pukekohe. Electric trains started operating from Pukekohe in February 2025.

== Notable people ==
- Bill Birch, MP
- Joeli Vidiri, former All Black, Counties Steelers and Auckland Blues representative
- Possum Bourne, former World Rally Championship driver with the Subaru World Rally Team
- Eric Murray, double Olympic Gold Medalist (London 2012, Rio 2016), 8 time World Champion in Rowing, attended Pukekohe high school
- Leslie Comrie, astronomer and pioneer in mechanical computation
- Simon Doull, New Zealand Blackcaps cricket representative and radio personality
- Peter Fa'afiu, diplomat, global director of Amnesty International
- A. J. Hackett, ONZM and entrepreneur who popularised bungee jumping
- Liam Lawson, F1 racing driver raised in Pukekohe
- Jonah Lomu, All Black, born in Pukekohe, educated at Wesley College
- Rex Mason, mayor and MP
- Carl Ruiterman, racing driver
- Malietoa Tanumafili II, Samoan Head of State—educated at Wesley College
- Allan Wilson, molecular biologist—grew up in the area

== Climate ==
Climate data for Pukekohe (1991–2020)
Month	Jan	Feb	Mar	Apr	May	Jun	Jul	Aug	Sep	Oct	Nov	Dec	Year
Mean daily maximum °C (°F)	23.5 (74.3)	24.1 (75.4)	22.6 (72.7)	20.1 (68.2)	17.4 (63.3)	15.1 (59.2)	14.3 (57.7)	14.8 (58.6)	16.2 (61.2)	17.6 (63.7)	19.3 (66.7)	21.6 (70.9)	18.9 (66.0)
Daily mean °C (°F)	18.8 (65.8)	19.4 (66.9)	17.9 (64.2)	15.8 (60.4)	13.5 (56.3)	11.4 (52.5)	10.5 (50.9)	11.0 (51.8)	12.3 (54.1)	13.6 (56.5)	15.1 (59.2)	17.3 (63.1)	14.7 (58.5)
Mean daily minimum °C (°F)	14.1 (57.4)	14.7 (58.5)	13.3 (55.9)	11.4 (52.5)	9.6 (49.3)	7.7 (45.9)	6.7 (44.1)	7.1 (44.8)	8.4 (47.1)	9.7 (49.5)	10.9 (51.6)	13.1 (55.6)	10.6 (51.0)
Average rainfall mm (inches)	71.2 (2.80)	64.3 (2.53)	80.3 (3.16)	98.5 (3.88)	124.5 (4.90)	137.2 (5.40)	146.5 (5.77)	130.7 (5.15)	108.4 (4.27)	100.3 (3.95)	88.0 (3.46)	93.1 (3.67)	1,243 (48.94)
Source: NIWA

== Bibliography ==
- Bartholomew, Robert (2020). No Maori Allowed – New Zealand's Forgotten History of Racial Segregation. Self published. ISBN 9780473488864.
- Belgrave, Michael (2024). Becoming Aotearoa: A New History of New Zealand. Auckland: Massey University Press. ISBN 9780995131866.
- Carlyon, Jenny; Morrow, Diana (2016). Changing Times: New Zealand Since 1945. Auckland University Press. ISBN 9781869407827.
- Chhiba, Uka (2007). Indians in Pukekohe: 1918–2006. Pukekohe East Primary School Reunion Committee.
- Hayward, Bruce W. (2017). Out of the Ocean, Into the Fire. Geoscience Society of New Zealand. pp. 207–211. ISBN 9780473395964.
- Morgan, William (1963). Morris, N. (ed.). The Journal of William Morgan. Libraries Department of the Auckland City Council.
- Mackintosh, Lucy (2021). Shifting Grounds: Deep Histories of Tāmaki Makaurau Auckland. Bridget Williams Books. p. 98. doi:10.7810/9781988587332. ISBN 978-1-988587-33-2.
- Moon, Paul (2023). Auckland: The Twentieth Century Story. Oratia Books. ISBN 9781990042355.
- O'Malley, Vincent (2016). The Great War for New Zealand: Waikato 1800–2000. Bridget William Books. ISBN 9781927277577.
- Templeton, Malcolm (2016). The Broken Decade: Prosperity, depression and recovery in New Zealand, 1928-39. Otago University Press. ISBN 9781927322260.
