= Pukekohe East Explosion Crater =

Volcano in Auckland, New Zealand

- Pukekohe East Crater
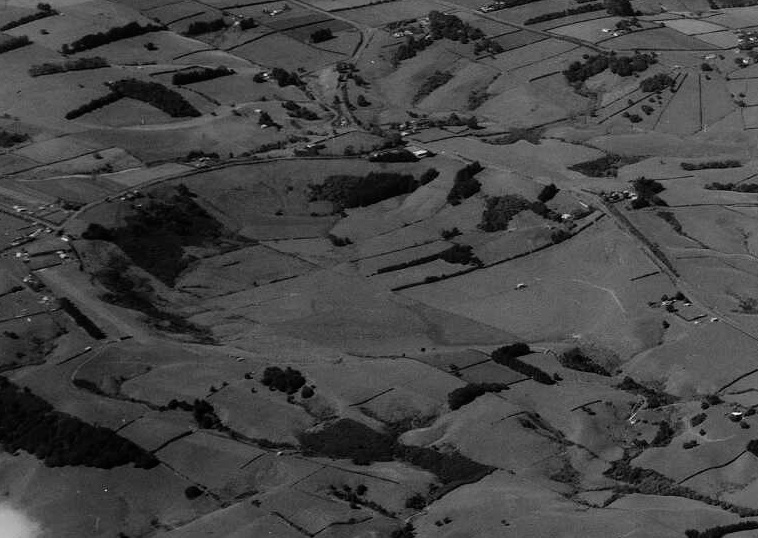
- An aerial view of the Pukekohe East Explosion Crater from 1961.

Highest point
- Coordinates: 37.192°S 174.942°E

Geography
- Location: Auckland, North Island, New Zealand

Geology
- Volcanic field: South Auckland volcanic field

The Pukekohe East Explosion Crater, also known as the Pukekohe East Crater, is one of the best preserved and most prominent volcanoes of the South Auckland volcanic field in New Zealand. The basalt maar erupted approximately 680,000 years ago.

== Geology ==
The Pukekohe East Explosion Crater erupted an estimated 680,000 years ago. It is one of the best preserved volcanoes in the South Auckland volcanic field, and one of the few well-preserved basalt craters in New Zealand.

The crater is approximately one kilometre in diameter, and is found on privately owned land. Pukekohe East Road and Runciman Road run along the crest of the crater.

== History ==
During the early colonial era of New Zealand, it was known as Papach's Crater. In 1863, the Pukekohe East Presbyterian Church was built on the rim of the crater. The church was used as a military stockade during the Invasion of the Waikato, most notably during the Defence of Pukekohe East, when a Māori taua (war party) of approximately 200 men from Ngāti Maniapoto and Ngāti Pou iwi attacked the church in September 1863.

The Geoscience Society of New Zealand scheduled the crater as a nationally important feature.
