= Wairoa North Fault =

Active fault in New Zealand

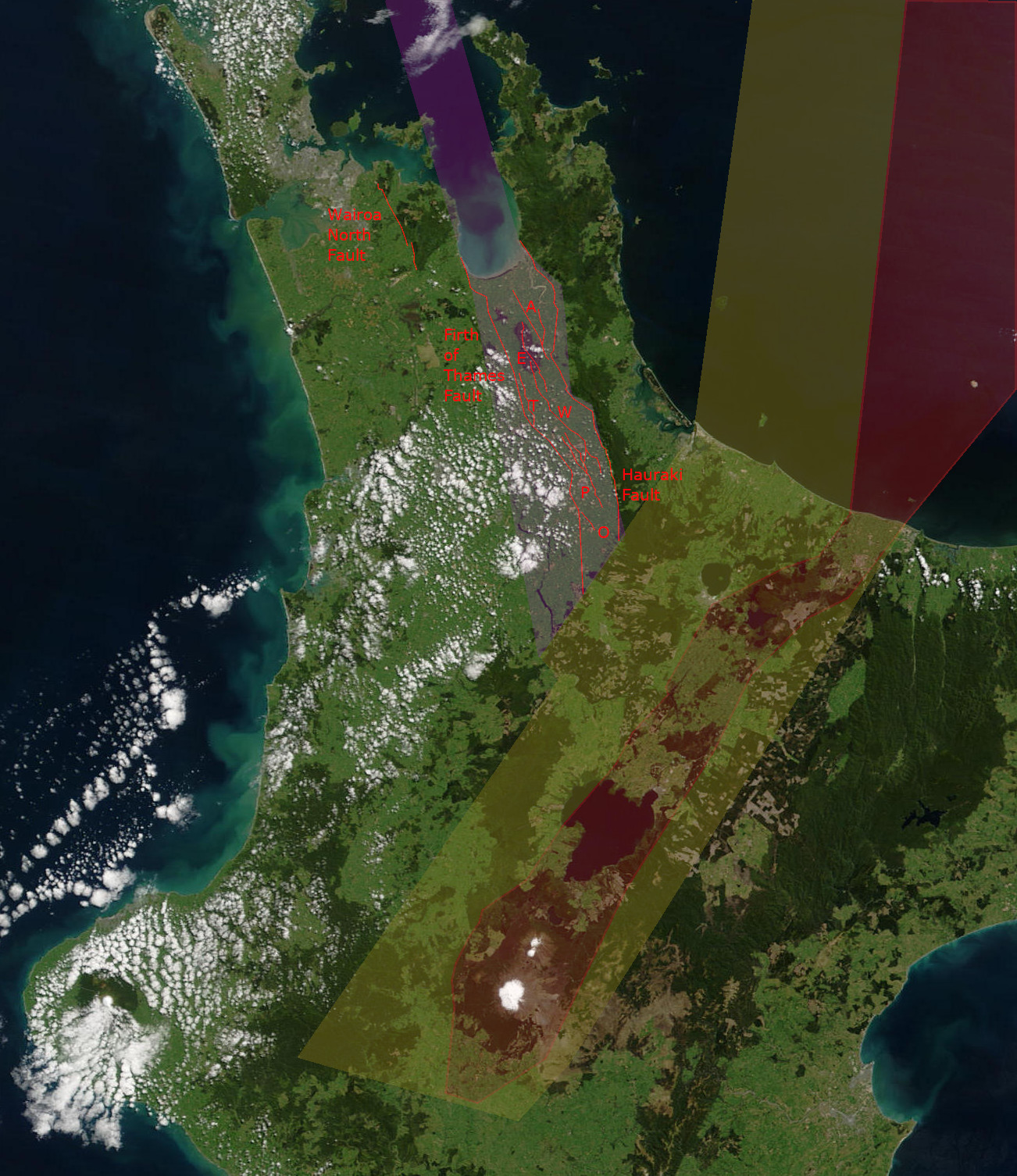
- The Wairoa North Fault is shown with its parallel alignment with the faults of the Hauraki Rift to its east. These include the presumed inactive Hauraki Fault and Firth of Thames Fault. The active Kerepehi Fault intra-rift fault segments are labelled A (Awaiti), E (Elstow), W (Waitoa), P (Te Poi) and O (Okoroire), as is the active Te Puninga Fault (T). The Hauraki Rift is shown in light purple shading, the old Taupō Rift in light yellow and modern Taupō Rift in light red shading.
- Map of faults in Auckland region. The Wairoa North Fault is in red (ie an active fault) towards top centre of map. The map also shows well characterised fault segments (dark grey) and some poorly faults (grey). A number of faults characterised by sea floor studies off the west coast of North Island are not shown as reasonably accurate data does not appear to be in public domain. If you click on Map to enlarge it this enables mouse over of the fault names.
- Etymology: Wairoa
- Country: New Zealand
- Region: South Auckland Regions

Characteristics
- Segments: Clevedon, Hunua and Paparimu
- Length: 24 km (15 mi)
- Dip angle: 50-70
- Displacement: Likely greater than 120 m (390 ft) in last 2.6 million years (0.05mm/year)

Tectonics
- Plate: Indo-Australian
- Status: Quaternary fault
- Type: Normal fault
- Movement: M_{w} 6.7
- Age: Miocene
- New Zealand geology database (includes faults)

The Wairoa North Fault has a maximum M_{w} 6.7 potential for normal fault rupture and is the closest known active fault to the city of Auckland being 40 km (25 mi) to the south east.

== Geology ==
The Wairoa North Fault is along the western aspect of the Hunua Ranges which is a horst with a mesozoic greywacke basement between it and the inferred inactive Firth of Thames Fault. There are multiple inferred inactive faults in the ranges but the area of the Wairoa North Fault was discovered to be seismologically active with low magnitude earthquakes after recordings began in the 1950s. The fault has 3 segments with potential for full rupture events every 12,600 years. To the north the faults now inactive extensions created the Clevedon Valley, and to the south these extensions separates the highest part of the Hunua Ranges from the Happy Valley basin. The fault appears to be along the eastern border of the Stokes Magnetic Anomaly System (New Zealand Junction Magnetic Anomaly) that essentially goes down almost the entire west coast of New Zealand. To the north the Wairoa North Fault continues as the inactive Waikopua Fault which is now projected with high confidence to become the North Waikopua Fault off shore, then the Islington Bay/Mototapu Fault between Rangitoto and Mototapu, before probably continuing as the Whangaparaoa Passage Fault. To the south the Wairoa North Fault is continued by the inactive Wairoa South and Maunganua faults.

== Earthquakes ==
The Wairoa North Fault has had some notable seismic events in the past:

- 1835 Auckland earthquake: A magnitude 6.5 earthquake struck Clevedon, with its epicentre located on the Waikopua segment of the Wairoa North Fault, and with a depth of 25 km. The shaking of the quake was felt strongly throughout the Auckland region, potentially causing damage to buildings and infrastructure. So far, it is unknown if this earthquake caused a segment rupture or a full rupture of the Wairoa North Fault, and shows that research and additional studies regarding the fault is vital in order to understand its full potential and behaviour.
