= Hauraki Fault =

Postulated currently inactive fault in New Zealand

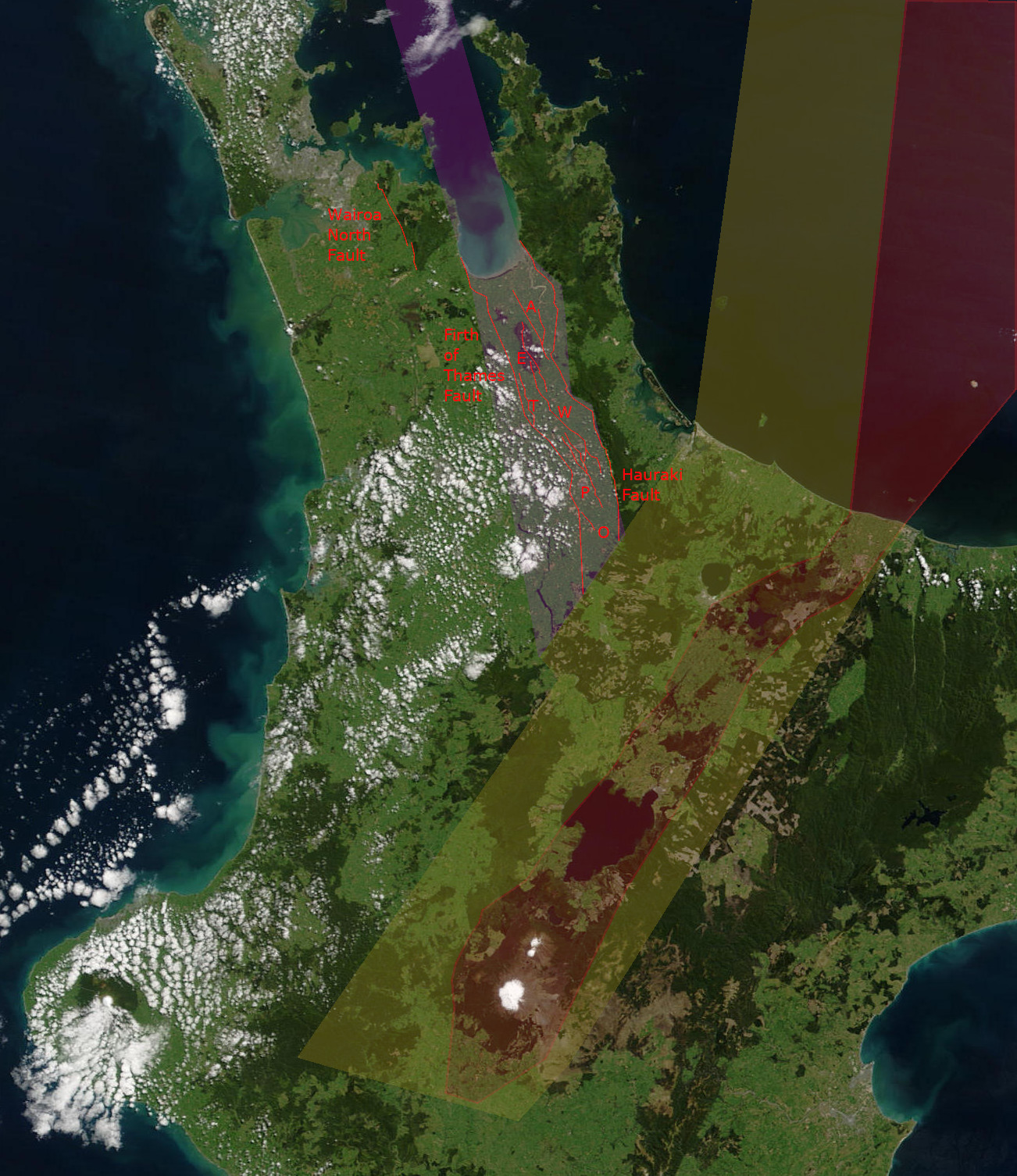
- The presumed inactive Hauraki Fault of the Hauraki Rift's eastern edge is labelled as is the Firth of Thames Fault at the rifts western edge. The active Kerepehi Fault intra-rift fault segments are labelled A (Awaiti), E (Elstow), W (Waitoa), P (Te Poi) and O (Okoroire), as is the active Te Puninga Fault (T). The indirectly associated with the Hauraki Rift, Wairoa North Fault is also shown. The Hauraki Rift is shown in light purple shading, the old Taupō Rift in light yellow and modern Taupō Rift in light red shading.
- Etymology: Hauraki Plains
- Country: New Zealand
- Region: South Auckland Regions

Characteristics
- Length: 220 km (140 mi)
- Displacement: 0.46 mm (0.018 in)/yr

Tectonics
- Plate: Indo-Australian
- Status: Quaternary fault
- Type: Normal fault
- Age: Miocene
- New Zealand geology database (includes faults)

The Hauraki Fault is a normal fault at the North Island of New Zealand. It is along the eastern side of the still tectonically active Hauraki Rift which could have a length up to 220 km (140 mi) and fairly likely 150 km (93 mi). The recently identified but yet to be fully characterised 25 km long Te Puninga fault is presumably an intra-rift fault which augments the active displacement of the rift accommodated by the active intra-rift Kerepehi Fault. However shallow small earthquakes have been mapped to the presumed location of the Hauraki Fault.

== Geology ==
The fault is inferred from the sharp transition to the east from the Firth of Thames and Hauraki Plains to the Coromandel and Kaimai Ranges with hot spring activity along this line.
