= Pukekohe Hill =

Volcano in Auckland, New Zealand

- Pukekohekohe
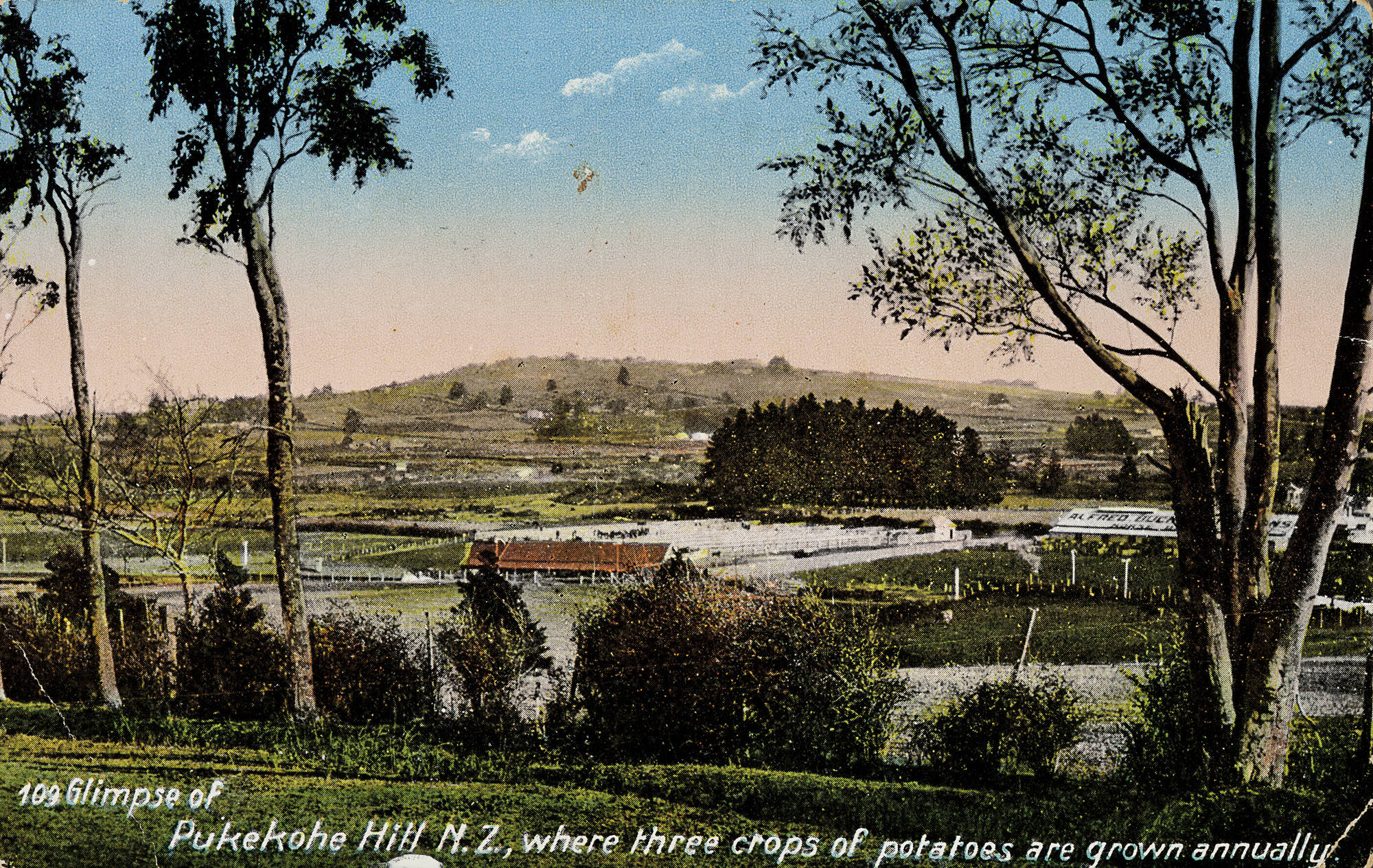
- Pukekohe Hill seen in a 1912 postcard

Highest point
- Elevation: 222 m (728 ft)
- Coordinates: 37.228917°S 174.893246°E

Geography
- Location: Auckland, North Island, New Zealand

Geology
- Volcanic field: South Auckland volcanic field

Pukekohe Hill (known traditionally as Pukekohekohe) is one of the most prominent volcanoes of the South Auckland volcanic field in New Zealand. The shield volcano erupted approximately 550,000 years ago, making it one of the youngest known volcanoes of the field.

== Geology ==
Pukekohe Hill is one of the youngest known volcanoes in the South Auckland volcanic field, erupting an estimated 550,000 years ago. It is a gently-sloping shield volcano, which lies near the centre of the volcanic field. The hill is composed almost entirely of basalt lava flows.

== History ==
The traditional Māori name Pukekohekohe ("Hill of Kohekohe") refers to Dysoxylum spectabile, also known as the New Zealand mahogany tree, which used to be a prominent part of the native bush on in the area. Prior to European settlement, the hill was important to Waiohua tribes including Ngāti Tamaoho, Ngāti Te Ata and Te Ākitai, due to the strategic views and quality soil. The northern slopes of the hill were home to some of the largest croplands (māra kai) for the Tāmaki Māori people who settled here.

In 1853, the hill became a part of Te Awa nui o Taikehu, a reserve the Crown created for Te Ākitai Waiohua during land sales. After the Invasion of the Waikato, the land was confiscated in 1865, after which the European town of Pukekohe was built to the north of the hill. The hill is the namesake of the town. People who had lived in Te Awa nui o Taikehu returned to the area in the 1870s, often working as labourers in the market gardens on the former lands of the reserve.

In the early 1900s, the northern slopes of Pukekohe Hill became the main source of potatoes and onion crops in New Zealand. The soil was renowned for being fertile, as three annual crops of potatoes and onions could be harvested annually. The hill is one of the most prominent landforms in Pukekohe, and the peak was kept as a nature reserve, in order to preserve the scenic view at the peak. The peak is topped with a grove of mature tōtara trees.
