= White New Zealand League =

New Zealand pressure group against Asian immigration

The White New Zealand League was a reactionary pressure group founded in 1926 to campaign against Chinese and Indian immigration to New Zealand.

== History ==
The White New Zealand League was founded in 1926 in South Auckland by a group of European New Zealanders. The League’s chief ideologue and secretary was Pukekohe potato farmer George Parvin. He was influenced by the eugenics movement and anti-immigrant rhetoric coming out of white-dominated parts of the Commonwealth.

In the founding year, the League published the Citizens of the Future are the Children of Today pamphlet in Auckland, which argued that a "white New Zealand" was the nation's inheritance and it should be maintained for "your children's children and the Empire." The League's slogan was "keep New Zealand a white man's country." While Māori people were not considered cultural equals to white New Zealanders by the League, they were in effect classed as "honorary whites," as the League focused on pressuring the government to pass and extend legislation to decrease Chinese and Indian immigration to New Zealand.

The League was supported by civil society and early nationalist groups, such as the New Zealand Natives Association, and wrote to trade unions to ask for support in their campaigns against the "Asiatic influx." Parvin claimed to have the endorsement of 90% of New Zealand's newspapers, trade unions and local bodies. In 1928, the League also canvassed parliamentary candidates for their support.

The League was short lived and was succeeded by the Pukekohe Federated Farmers, who argued for the seizure of all Asian-owned land and their forced repatriation up until 1952.

In response to the League, the New Zealand Indian Central Association was formed in 1926 to advocate on behalf of the Indian community.
