= Defence of Pukekohe East =

1863 event in the New Zealand Wars

- Part of New Zealand Wars
| Date | 13 September 1863 – 14 September 1863 |
| Location | Pukekohe East, New Zealand |
| Result | British victory |

Belligerents
| New Zealand Government; British Army; Māori allies | Ngāti Maniapoto, with Ngāti Pou, Māori King Movement |

Commanders and leaders
| Sergeant Perry; Lieutenant Grierson; Captain Moir | Rapurahi, Wahanui Huatare, Raureti Paiaka and Hopa te Rangianini |

Strength
| Besieged; 8 New Zealand Militia and 9 New Zealand Special Constables, Relieving force 182+ | 200 Maori. |

Casualties and losses
| 3 killed 8 wounded | 40+ killed. |

The Defence of Pukekohe East was an action during the Invasion of the Waikato, part of the New Zealand Wars. On 13 September and 14 September 1863, 11 settlers and 6 militia men inside a half-completed stockade around the Pukekohe East church held off a Māori taua or war party of approximately 200 men from Ngāti Maniapoto and Ngāti Pou iwi, until they were relieved by detachments of the 18th, 65th and 70th Regiments. In a series of actions around the stockade the taua sustained 20% casualties and retreated.

== Background ==
Many Europeans settled in New Zealand between 1830 and 1860, by which time British approximately equaled the Māori. Europeans were generally welcomed by the Māori. However disputes over land, sovereignty and mana lead to skirmishes between Europeans and pro and anti European Māori, known as the New Zealand Wars, notably in the north in the 1840s, in Taranaki from 1860 and in the Waikato in 1863. In the Waikato, south of the British settlement at Auckland, Māori formed the Kingi Movement. Kingitanga involved adopting European culture in order to preserve their own people: Kingites established a newspaper, a bank, and a parliament, as well as electing a king. These last two actions were seen as threatening British sovereignty, leading Governor Sir George Grey to invade the Waikato.

== Pukekohe East ==
Pukekohe East lies on the rim of the Pukekohe East Explosion Crater, south east of Auckland. Although potentially fertile, the land remained in virgin forest, or bush, and was never densely populated. In the 1830s, those Māori who had lived closest were defeated by Hongi Hika's Ngāpuhi iwi, the survivors abandoning their settlements and retreating south. When settler government came to grant titles to the land this history led to dispute over boundaries and ownership. The land was first sold to Europeans in 1843, as part of the general land purchases in the Auckland area. Not until 1853 were disputes between different Māori claimants resolved and the area first settled. Families of farmers built houses and began to clear the land but this process was far from complete when war broke out.

Defence of Pukekohe East

Heritage New Zealand – Category 2
- Official name: Pukekohe East Presbyterian Church
- Designated: 7 April 1983
- Reference no.: 483

== The church ==
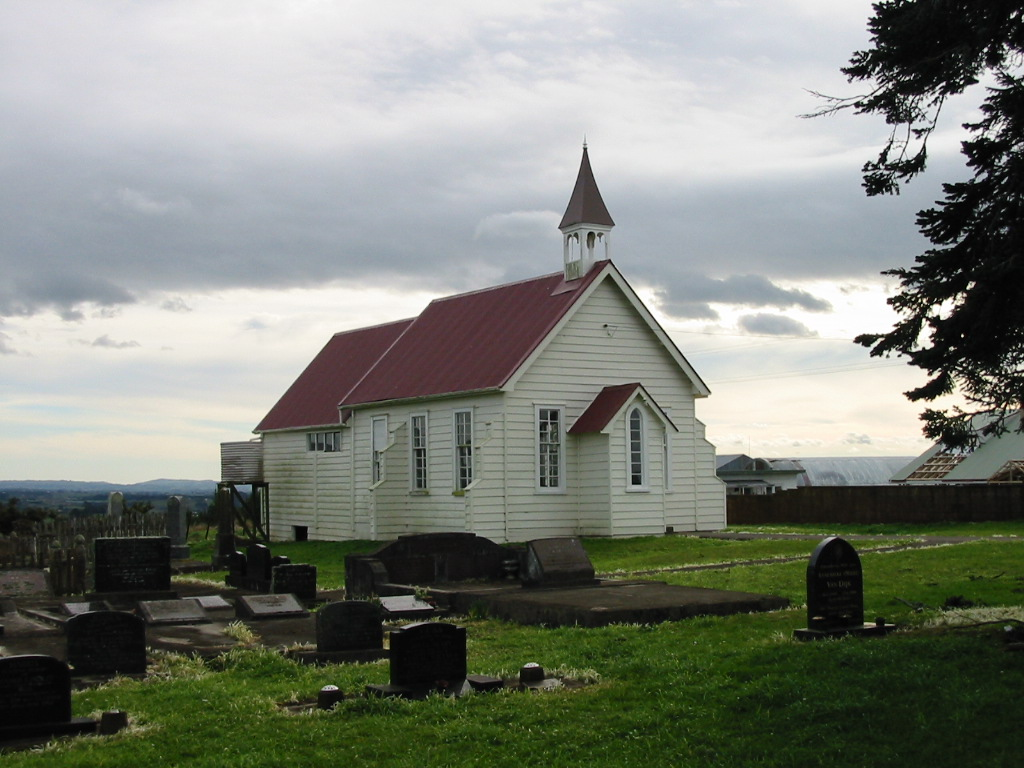
Pukekohe East Church

The young settlement included many Presbyterian Scots. They resolved to build a Presbyterian church in 1861, undertaking the majority of the work themselves and paying for the cost of £126 2s 5d by subscription. Construction was of ¾ inch weatherboards of rimu and tōtara wood. These weren't bulletproof. When the church was opened on 5 April 1863, this was the largest building and centre of the community - although it was just 30 feet (9.1 m) by 15 feet (4.6 m), excluding porch and belfry. The church stands on the high ground of the crater rim, in what would have been a natural defensive position, but for the dense bush which still came uncomfortably close, except to the south, where land had been cleared for a cemetery.

== War in the Waikato ==
On Sunday 12 July 1863 General Cameron's Army advanced into Waikato territory from its frontier base of Pōkeno. The settlers of Pukekohe East, a few miles away, received no official notice; they were informed that afternoon by Reverend Norrie, who had conducted a service for the soldiers. The 65th Regiment advanced through their settlements later that day.

The settlers had little understanding that they would be subject to guerilla warfare from Kiingitanga Māori responding to the Waikato invasion. They did realise the danger to women and children and most were sent to safety in Auckland. Some farms were abandoned, especially those that were isolated or near areas of dense bush. Cattle were left to wander and these became a target for the Kiingitanga attackers. Abandoned farm houses were ransacked by Māori mainly looking for food and thieves stole tools and other useful equipment. The Auckland area north of the self-proclaimed Māori border became a hive of military activity and guerilla warfare for many months.

On 16 July a number of Māori at Papakura (Kirikiri) were taken from that native settlement along with their arms and ammunition. A group of armed Māori in the bush nearby could not be apprehended and escaped. Some Māori at a coal field, east of Papakura, were taken prisoner and brought to Drury. On 17 July a convoy was attacked by Māori a few miles south of Drury and soldiers killed. Settlers as far east as Clevedon and Ardmore had their houses and farms attacked. On Wednesday 14 July, two settlers at nearby Ramarama were killed by Māori raiders, which illustrated the vulnerability of Pukekohe East. Many families, and virtually all women and children were evacuated. Those men who remained behind decided to construct a stockade around the church, as a refuge in the event of attack. On 22 July James Hunt, a sawyer, was shot in the back at his farm between Papakura and Drury. Joseph Hunt was shot and killed by 30-40 Māori while loading a bullock dray in the bush. The son of Captain Calvert was murdered by 30 Māori in his house. A farm hand, Cooper, was killed in the bush nearby while looking for stray cattle. During the next 3 weeks a further 13 settlers were killed on isolated farms in the area south of Auckland. Later, on 4 October, 2 boys were killed by Māori near Clevedon, when they surprised Māori fishing in a stream on their farm. Throughout August distant shots were heard as Māori killed cattle for food but they always escaped before the troops or militia arrived.

== The stockade ==
The stockade was built 10 feet (3.0 m) from the wall of the church, excepting small bastions on the north-western and south-eastern corners, to allow enfilading fire. The entrance was built into the south-eastern corner, visitors being channelled though a chicane exposed to the defenders' fire. The walls were made of small logs – on average 6 inches (150 mm) in diameter – just enough to stop a musket ball. These were laid horizontally, and nailed to posts, instead of vertically as was the Māori custom in their forts, or pā. Gaps between logs were left for firing positions. The stockade was to be 7 feet (2.1 m) high, but was not completed in September, at which time walls were just over five feet, forcing defenders to stoop. Work had been stopped by Lieutenant Daniel Lusk, who conducted an inspection of the amateur settlers work on 31 August. Lt. Lusk ordered a moat dug around the outside, the earth being piled against the wall. A trench 3–4 feet deep and 6 feet (1.8 m) wide had been completed by the attack. Bush close to the south-eastern corner was also ordered to be cleared. The 10 acres (40,000 m^{2}) around the church was cleared in the days before the attack, but large stumps and low growth left, providing cover and concealment.

== The taua ==
Most knowledge of the taua comes from an interview with a survivor, Te Huia Raureti, by historian James Cowan. The defenders estimated the taua contained 300 to 400 warriors, but Te Huia Raureti estimates it was 200 strong. They comprised Ngāti Maniapoto, with Ngāti Pou and a few northern Waikato men. The taua assembled at Meremere on 12 September and paddled up the Waikato River in three war canoes, or waka. The party launched an abortive attack on the Alexandra Redoubt, then marched to the north, keeping inside bush to the west of Pōkeno, where they spent the night. The taua had been active in the area searching for food and killing stray cattle.

According to Te Huia Raureti, Raureti Paiaka and Hopa te Rangianini said 'In the battle to come let us confine ourselves strictly to fighting; let no one touch anything in the settlers' houses, or their stock, or otherwise interfere with their property.' A dispute broke out within the taua after Ngāti Maniapoto under Wahanui disregarded this wish and looted the Scott house.

Six of the attackers bodies were found within a short distance of the church. Several had been dragged a short distance before being abandoned. They had ropes tied around their ankles. A further 30 were later found in shallow graves in the bush. It was claimed that women had dragged the bodies from the battlefield.

A memorial boulder to six Māori "who lost their lives in the engagement. 14th Sept. 1863" was unveiled in the churchyard in 1929.

== Conclusions ==
The church is now a Category 2 listed building. Bullet holes can be seen in the walls and porch, and in the gravestone of Betsy Hodge.

The defence of Pukekohe East is interesting as one of the few occasions in which Māori attacked a European fortification; the more so in that they obtained more than 10 to 1 superiority in numbers, while the fortification was designed and constructed by amateurs, undermanned and incomplete at the time of attack.

== Sources ==
- James Cowan. The New Zealand Wars: A History of the Māori Campaigns and the Pioneering Period. R.E. Owen, Wellington, 1922.
- Tim Ryan, "War comes to Pukekohe", in Susanne Stone, Editor, The Original Pukekohe, W.J. Deed Printing Ltd, Waiuku, 2005
