= Firth of Thames Fault =

Postulated currently inactive fault in New Zealand

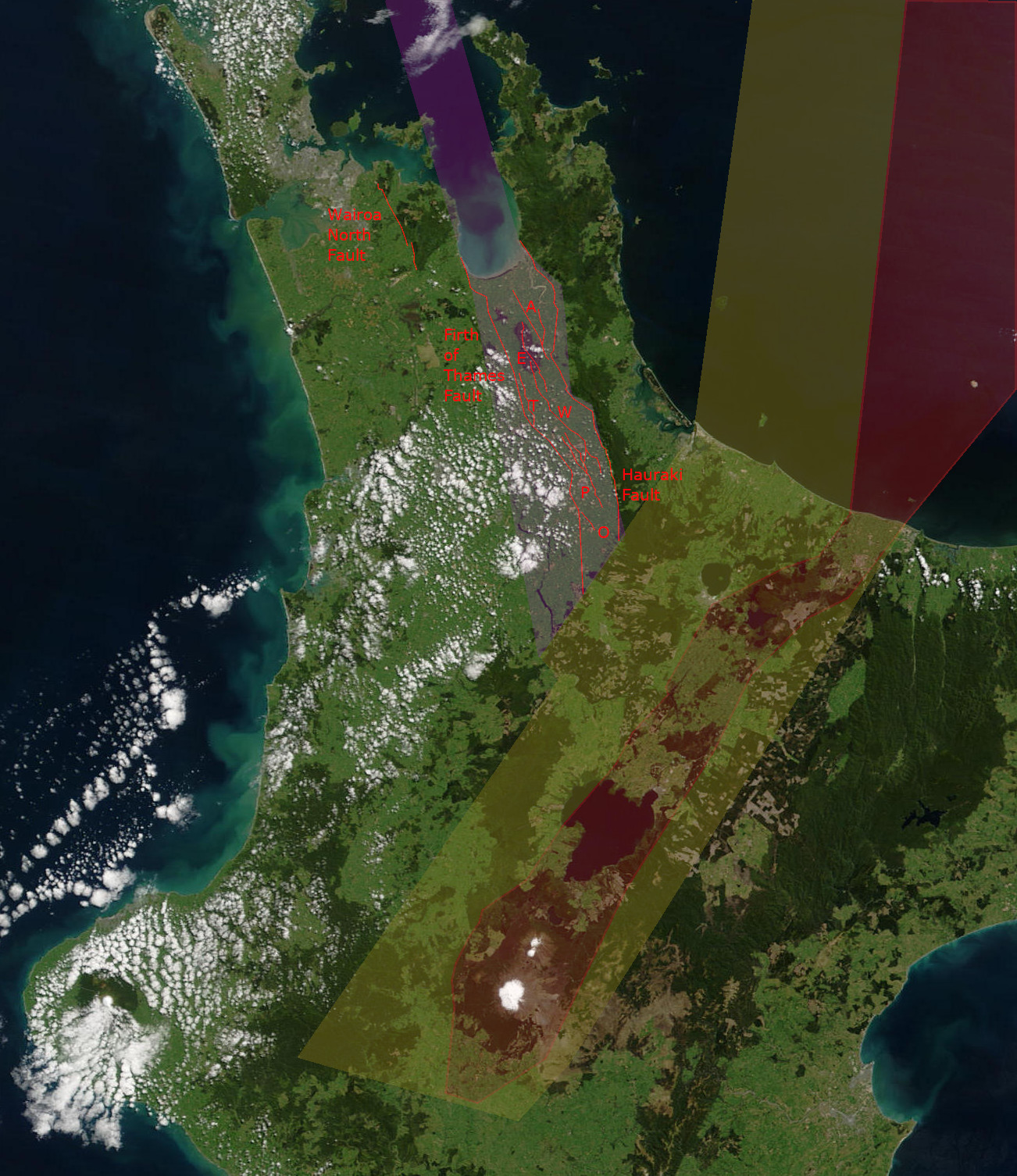
- The presumed inactive Firth of Thames Fault of the Hauraki Rift's western edge is labelled as is the Hauraki at the rifts eastern edge. The active Kerepehi Fault intra-rift fault segments are labelled A (Awaiti), E (Elstow), W (Waitoa), P (Te Poi) and O (Okoroire), as is the active Te Puninga Fault (T). The indirectly associated with the Hauraki Rift, Wairoa North Fault is also shown. The Hauraki Rift is shown in light purple shading, the old Taupō Rift in light yellow and modern Taupō Rift in light red shading.
- Etymology: Firth of Thames region north of Hauraki Plains
- Country: New Zealand
- Region: Waikato and South Auckland Regions

Characteristics
- Length: 220 km (140 mi)
- Displacement: 0.46 mm (0.018 in)/yr

Tectonics
- Plate: Indo-Australian
- Status: Quaternary fault
- Age: Miocene
- New Zealand Active Fault database

The Firth of Thames Fault is a postulated minor hinge fault along the western side of the still tectonically active Hauraki Rift which could have a length up to 220 km (140 mi) and fairly likely 150 km (93 mi). The recently identified but yet to be fully characterised 25 km long Te Puninga fault is presumably an intra-rift fault within a few kilometres of its line. Up to the discovery of the Te Puninga fault the active displacement of the rift was believed to be accommodated by the active intra-rift Kerepehi Fault.

== Geology ==
The fault is necessary to explain that the basement Jurassic metagreywackes that underlay the Hauraki Plains and Firth of Thames also form to the west the Hunua Range and its southern continuation, the Hapuakohe Range, with summit heights of up to 700 m (2,300 ft). Upper Tertiary eruptive rocks, the Kiwitahi Volcanics, are also present on the western side as isolated extrusive bodies which line the western boundary of the Hauraki depression. The possibility that it is a rift edge fault for only part of its length and intra-rift for others arises as it was long ago noted that the Waikato River exits the Taupō Rift in a garben that could align with a wider Hauraki Rift at its southern end than the southern aspects of the fault line predicts.
