= Bombay Hills =

Hills between the Auckland and Waikato Regions, New Zealand

Coordinates: 37.210781°S 175.021992°E

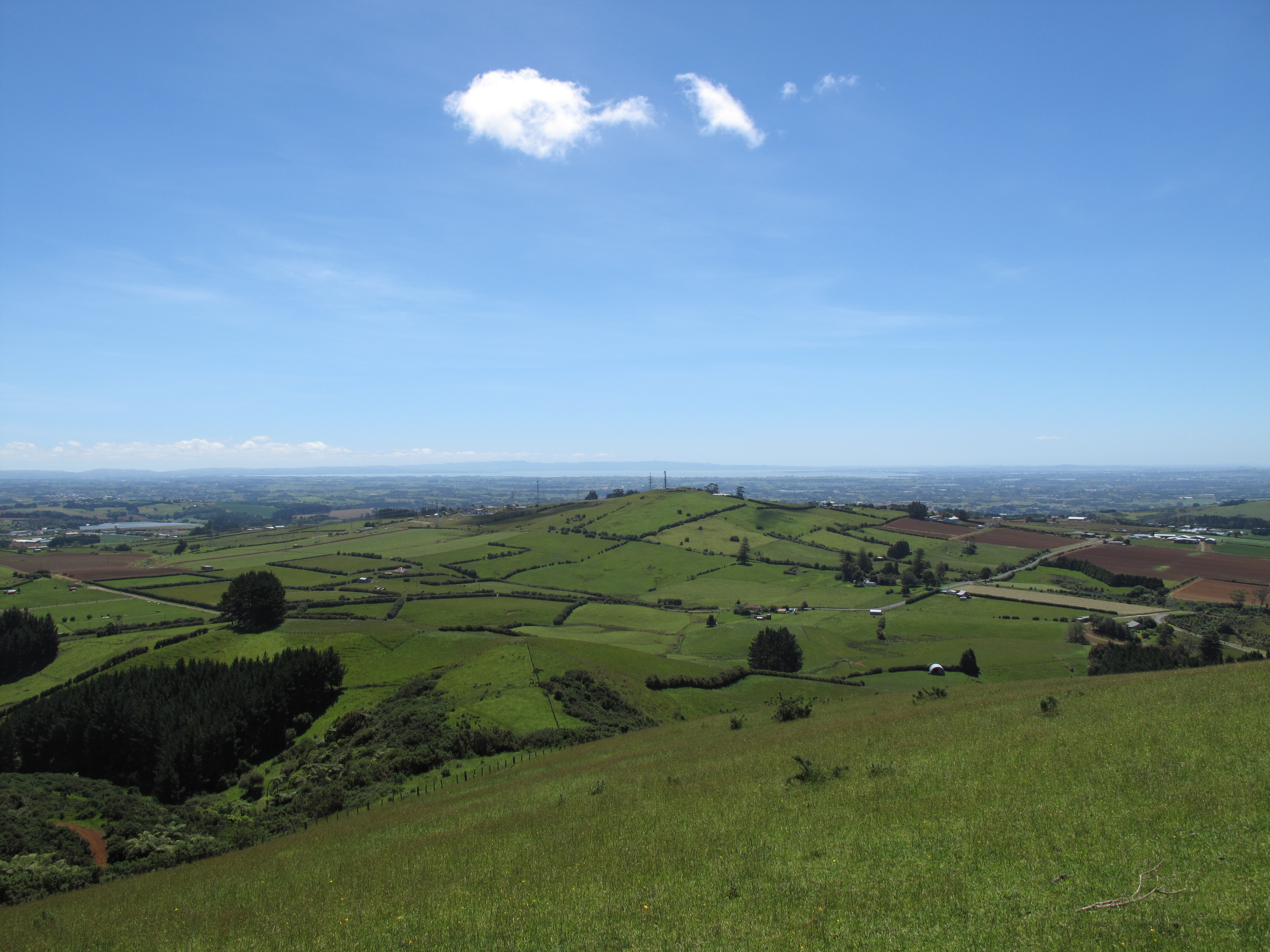
- View looking north-west towards Auckland from top of Mount Puketūtū

Highest point
- Peak: Puketūtū
- Elevation: 379 m (1,243 ft)

Geography
- Country: New Zealand

Geology
- Rock age: Pleistocene

The Bombay Hills are a range of hills to the south of Auckland, New Zealand. Though only a small and seemingly insignificant range of hills, they lie at the southern boundary of the Auckland region, and serve as a divide between Auckland and the Waikato region. There is a 19th-century settlement, Bombay, on the old main road south of Auckland, the Great South Road.

Aucklanders and other New Zealanders have a mostly light-hearted "love-hate" relationship. Stereotypically, Aucklanders view parts of the country "south of the Bombay Hills" as provincial and unsophisticated, while the rest of the country sees Aucklanders as brash and arrogant. For this reason, the boundary between Auckland and its southern neighbours bears great significance. People on both sides of the boundary are as likely to use the phrase "New Zealand stops at the Bombay Hills". The term was adopted by the 1990s New Zealand reggae band Southside of Bombay.

== Location ==
The hills are located 40 kilometres (25 mi) southeast of Auckland, close to the town of Pukekohe. State Highway 1 here reaches its highest point between Auckland and Tīrau in the eastern Waikato Region, 134 kilometres (83 mi) to the southeast. Bombay is the nearest settlement to the southern fringe of the Auckland metropolitan area.

== Name ==
The settlement of Bombay and hence the Bombay Hills are directly named after the ship Bombay, which landed in Auckland and brought settlers to the area, originally called Williamson's Clearing, in 1865. The ship itself was named after the Indian city of Bombay (now Mumbai).

== Geology ==
The Bombay Hills are a remnant of a shield volcano from the South Auckland volcanic field, which erupted an estimated 600,000 years ago. The hills are overlain by Hamilton Ash tephra which has weathered to create some of the best soils for market gardening in New Zealand.

The Bombay Hills are the barrier that halts the northward progression of the Waikato River. The hills cause it to turn west towards the coast where it empties into the Tasman Sea near Port Waikato.

== Demographics ==
Bombay Hills statistical area covers 30.16 km^{2} (11.64 sq mi) and had an estimated population of 2,050 as of June 2025, with a population density of 68 people per km^{2}.

Historical population
Year	Pop.	±% p.a.
2006	1,659	—
2013	1,509	−1.34%
2018	1,866	+4.34%
2023	1,989	+1.28%
The 2006 population is for a larger area of 31.68 km^{2}. Source:

Bombay Hills had a population of 1,989 in the 2023 New Zealand census, an increase of 123 people (6.6%) since the 2018 census, and an increase of 480 people (31.8%) since the 2013 census. There were 987 males, 999 females and 3 people of other genders in 669 dwellings. 2.0% of people identified as LGBTIQ+. The median age was 45.1 years (compared with 38.1 years nationally). There were 357 people (17.9%) aged under 15 years, 303 (15.2%) aged 15 to 29, 960 (48.3%) aged 30 to 64, and 366 (18.4%) aged 65 or older.

People could identify as more than one ethnicity. The results were 81.3% European (Pākehā); 13.3% Māori; 3.5% Pasifika; 13.0% Asian; 2.0% Middle Eastern, Latin American and African New Zealanders (MELAA); and 2.1% other, which includes people giving their ethnicity as "New Zealander". English was spoken by 95.8%, Māori language by 1.4%, Samoan by 0.3%, and other languages by 13.6%. No language could be spoken by 1.8% (e.g. too young to talk). New Zealand Sign Language was known by 0.3%. The percentage of people born overseas was 22.5, compared with 28.8% nationally.

Religious affiliations were 31.5% Christian, 2.7% Hindu, 1.8% Islam, 0.3% Māori religious beliefs, 0.5% Buddhist, 0.6% New Age, 0.2% Jewish, and 2.6% other religions. People who answered that they had no religion were 52.0%, and 8.0% of people did not answer the census question.

Of those at least 15 years old, 354 (21.7%) people had a bachelor's or higher degree, 930 (57.0%) had a post-high school certificate or diploma, and 351 (21.5%) people exclusively held high school qualifications. The median income was $49,800, compared with $41,500 nationally. 318 people (19.5%) earned over $100,000 compared to 12.1% nationally. The employment status of those at least 15 was that 903 (55.3%) people were employed full-time, 243 (14.9%) were part-time, and 24 (1.5%) were unemployed.

== Residents ==
The Bombay Hills has many former athletes as residents including Eric Murray (Olympic rower), Katherine Prumm (World Champion motorcyclist) and Andy Dalton (former All Black captain). Bombay is also the location of a monastery of enclosed Benedictine nuns, Tyburn Monastery.

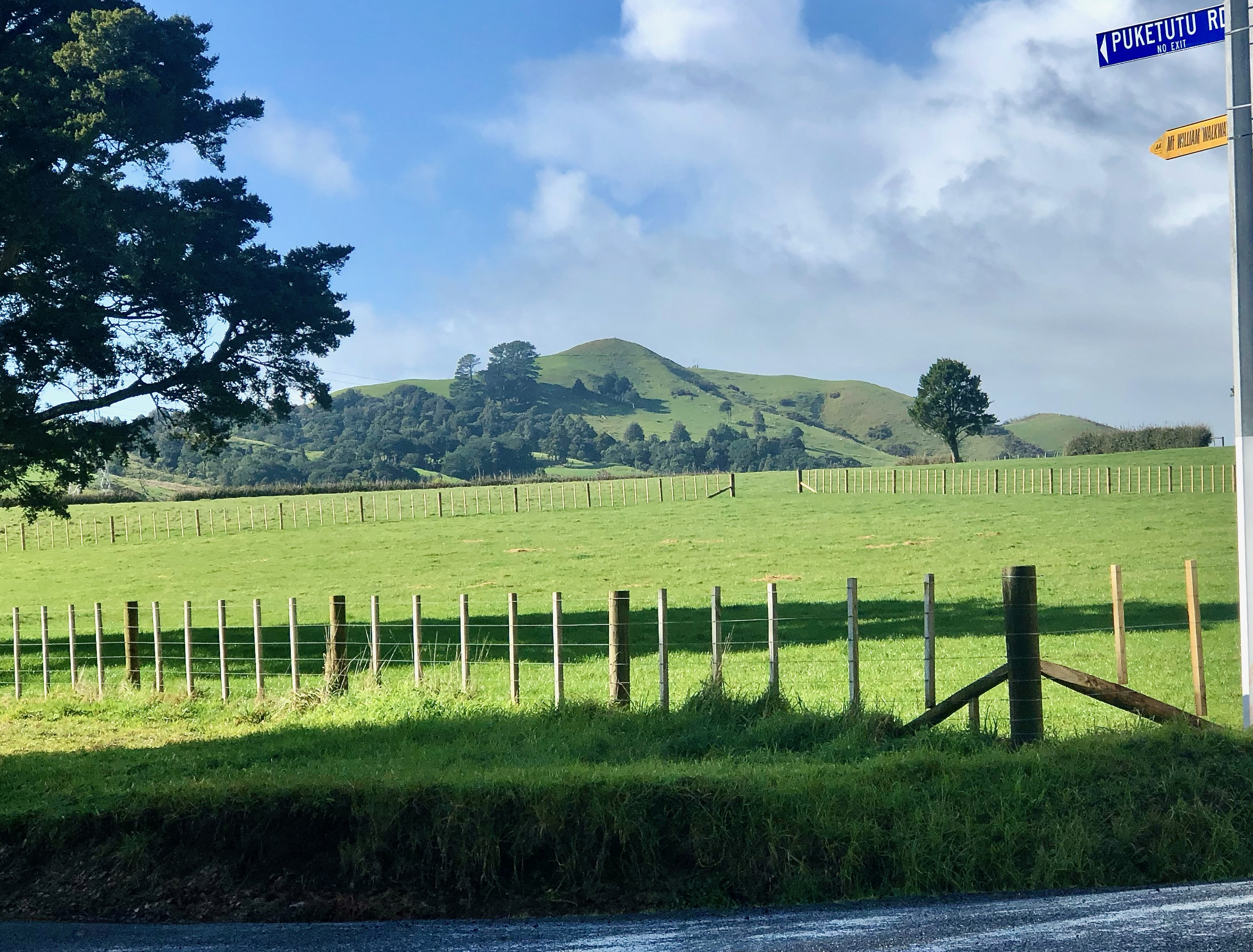
Mount William and Walkway sign

== Walkways ==
Te Araroa long-distance walkway through the Hunua Ranges closed in 2018. It now follows the Mt William Walkway over the Bombay Hills.

The 4.5 km (2.8 mi) Mount William Walkway links 376 m (1,234 ft) Puketutu and 369 m (1,211 ft) Mount William. It goes through bush with kauri, hard beech and king ferns and has views to Waikato, the west coast and Firth of Thames.

== Notable buildings ==
- St Peter in the Forest Church (Anglican)

== See also ==
- Tīpene / St Stephen's School
- Jafa, a sometimes pejorative term for a resident of Auckland
- The Watford Gap, a similar cultural border concept in the United Kingdom
