= Kerepehi Fault =

Fault system in New Zealand

- Kerepēhi Fault
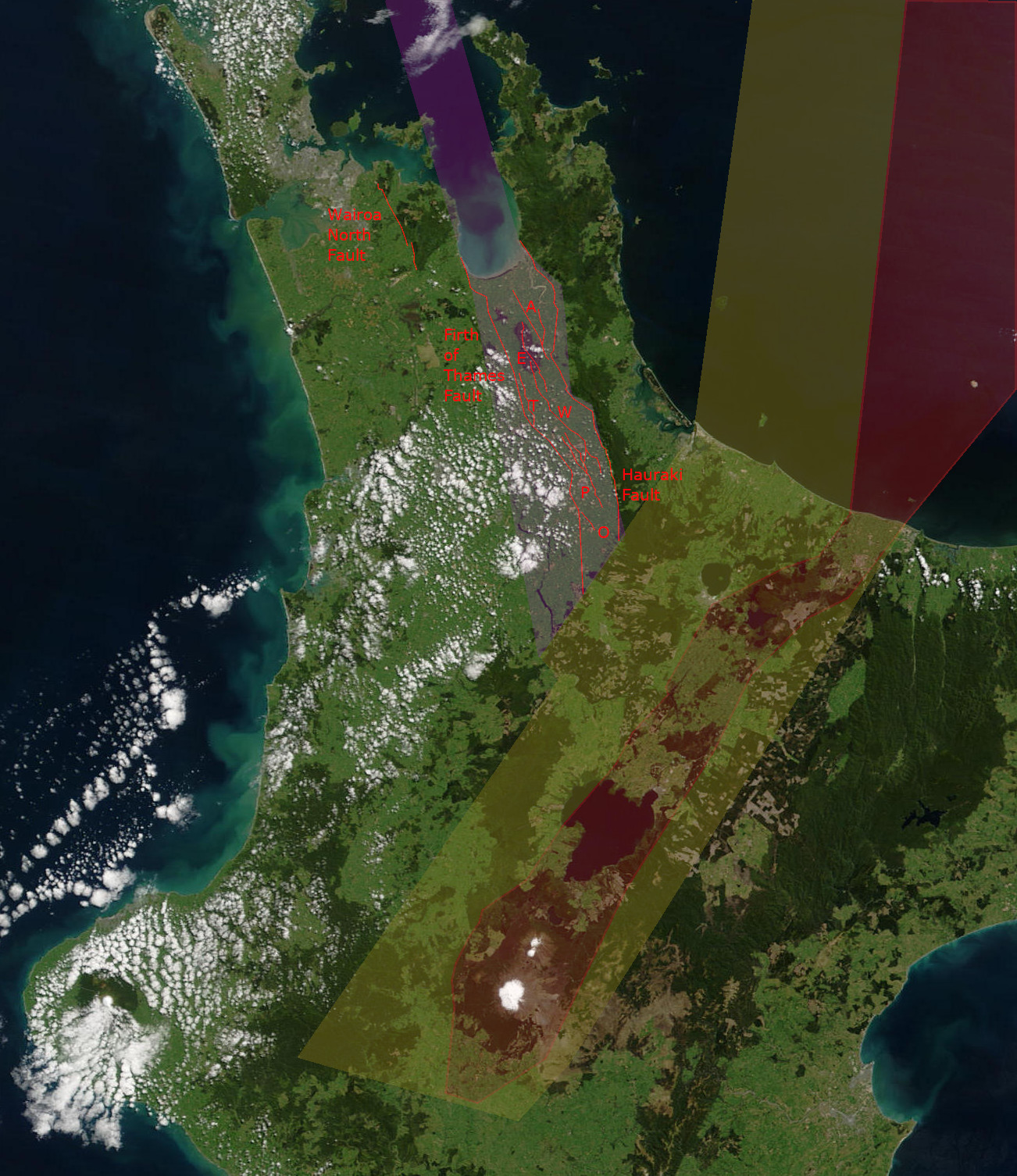
- The active Kerepehi Fault intra-rift fault in context of Hauraki Rift. Segments are labelled A (Awaiti), E (Elstow), W (Waitoa), P (Te Poi) and O (Okoroire). The also known to be active Te Puninga Fault (T) and an active fault only indirectly associated with the Hauraki Rift, the Wairoa North Fault are also shown. The presumed inactive Hauraki and Firth of Thames faults of the Hauraki Rift eastern and western edges respectively are also shown. The Hauraki Rift is shown in light purple shading, the old Taupō Rift in light yellow and modern Taupō Rift in light red shading.
- Active surface Hauraki Rift Fault segments in red. The fault line characterised by sea floor studies in the Firth of Thames and inactive on land is not shown and comparison with the other map on this page may be useful. If you click on map to enlarge it this enables mouse over of the fault names and other details.
- Etymology: Kerepehi region central to Hauraki Plains
- Country: New Zealand
- Region: Waikato and South Auckland Regions

Characteristics
- Length: 80 km (50 mi)
- Displacement: 0.46 mm (0.018 in)/yr

Tectonics
- Plate: Indo-Australian
- Status: Active
- Earthquakes: See 'Historical Earthquakes'
- Type: Normal fault
- Movement: M_{w} 7.2+
- Age: Miocene-Holocene
- New Zealand geology database (includes faults)

The Kerepehi Fault (also known as the Kerepēhi Fault) is a NeS-to NWeSE-striking normal fault system in the North Island of New Zealand aligned with the Hauraki rift valley that produced the Firth of Thames and the Hauraki Plains. The Kerepehi Fault has a maximum potential of generating earthquakes with magnitudes of M_{w} 7.2–7.4 or above.

== Geology ==
The Kerepehi Fault in the southern portion of the Hauraki Rift is much more complex than previously thought and as a result has the potential for large earthquakes, although single fault segment events should be less than 7 in magnitude. Previously it was thought to contain 5 fault segments with events separated by many thousands of years of moderate magnitude but the mean event separation anywhere in the fault zone is now known to be only about 1000 years in what is a belt of many faults and at least 6 complex segments on land. Three segments have been identified under the sea. The fault system extends therefore from Waiheke Island to south of Te Poi and is the intra-rift fault structure for the now geologically fairly inactive by New Zealand standards, Hauraki Rift. Work using geolocation on the Hauraki Rift which is a North - South trending, 250 km (160 mi) long and 25 km (16 mi) wide on-shore/off-shore continental rift reveals a widening rate of 0.9 mm (0.035 in)/year although some of the raw data suggests that at the Te Poi end it might be up to 1.5 mm (0.059 in)/year. The recently identified but yet to be fully characterised 25 km long Te Puninga fault is presumably a parallel intra-rift fault much closer to the western borders of the Hauraki Rift.

== Hazards ==
=== Earthquake hazards ===
Recent historic ruptures have involved up to 2 m (6.6 ft) of vertical displacement, which suggests associated contemporary earthquake risk that could be of seismic intensity VII on the Modified Mercalli intensity scale at the nearby major population centres, being Auckland, Hamilton, Tauranga and Thames. Forty percent of New Zealand's population live, and 40% of GDP generation occurs within 50 km (31 mi) of the fault. A major magnitude 7 event resulting from up to 3 segment rupture would be devastating to Hauraki Plains infrastructure.

=== Tsunami hazards ===
At least a third of the fault structure is likely to be underwater and thus will offer a tsunami hazard to the low-lying areas of the Hauraki Plains and shore areas of the Firth of Thames and Hauraki Gulf. The tsunami hazard was calculated to be low in 1999 but has not been revised as a result of the later on shore work showing that some earthquakes were larger than historically assumed.

== Historical earthquakes ==
In the past, the Kerepehi Fault has experienced significant earthquakes that might have occurred before the advent of written records. However, the following list consists of recently occurred quakes along the fault(s), as far back as the year 1900.

- 1926 Magnitude 4.6
- 1927 Magnitude 5.5
- 1972 Magnitude 4.9
- 2023 Magnitude 5.1
- 2023 Magnitude 4.8
