= Stokes Magnetic Anomaly =

Magnetic Anomaly in South Pacific region

The Stokes Magnetic Anomaly (also known as the Stokes Magnetic Anomaly System, SMAS, New Zealand Junction Magnetic Anomaly, JMA, great Nelson magnetic disturbance, Junction Anomaly, Campbell Magnetic Anomaly System, CMAS) is a magnetic anomaly on the Earth's surface that extends from New Caledonia to the Chatham Rise with complexity consistent with the theory of plate tectonics.

== History ==
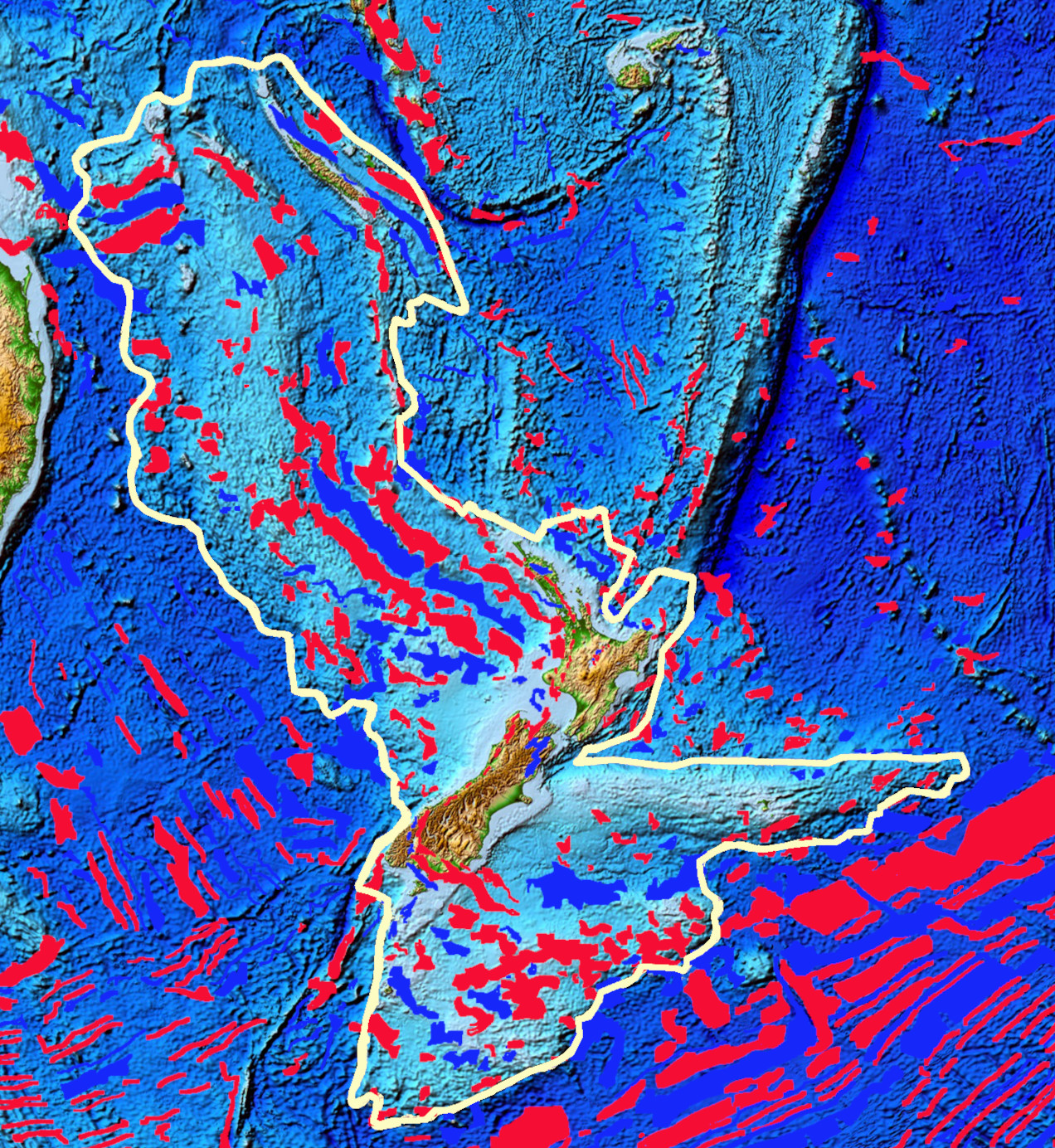
White outline of Zealandia with Stokes Magnetic Anomaly shown as "Z" shape of red (field deviation more than 100nT) and blue (field deviation less than -100nT) magnetic anomaly. The "Z" commences on the Lord Howe Rise and intersects present New Zealand land mass in the Northland Peninsula and bends to extend down the west coast of the country as a 1000km discontinuity until in Fiordland it bends to the east and exits New Zealand's east coast in South Otago. It is defined as far as the Campbell Plateau. Outside the confines of Zealandia on the oceanic plates, the effects of sea flow spreading are seen to the south in terms of parallel magnetic anomaly.

It is named after Captain (later Admiral) John Lort Stokes by G. C. Farr in 1916 as he described it first although such naming has proved controversial, hence many of the alternative names. The magnetic declinations were observed by Captain Stokes when captaining HMS Acheron and Commander (later Admiral) Byron Drury in HMS Pandora between 1851 and 1853.

== Geology ==
The Stokes Magnetic Anomaly has been characterised for over 3,000 km (1,900 mi) and was essential for understanding the geology of Zealandia as a mainly underwater continent. It extends from 700 km (430 mi) south of New Caledonia to almost the eastern edge of the Campbell Plateau. Over much of its length it has peaks about 30 km (19 mi) to 50 km (31 mi) apart, although this is not the case for much of its New Zealand west coast course. Where the anomaly crosses New Zealand it is displaced by approximately right angle changes in direction for a total of 1,000 km (620 mi) running down the western side of New Zealand from the Northland Peninsula in the North Island to Fiordland but then exiting New Zealand's South Island on its Otago east coast.

The Stokes Magnetic Anomaly has been related to magnetic anomaly extending in Australia as the east Lachlan Fold Belt or New England Fold Belt as an extension of where it commences near the western Challenger Plateau and Lord Howe Rise. This gives an age of up to 83 million years before present in its formation but alternatively, it may be extended to represent the earliest ocean crust formed between New Zealand and Marie Byrd Land in Antarctica so could be even older.
