= Hauraki Rift =

Rift system in North Island, New Zealand

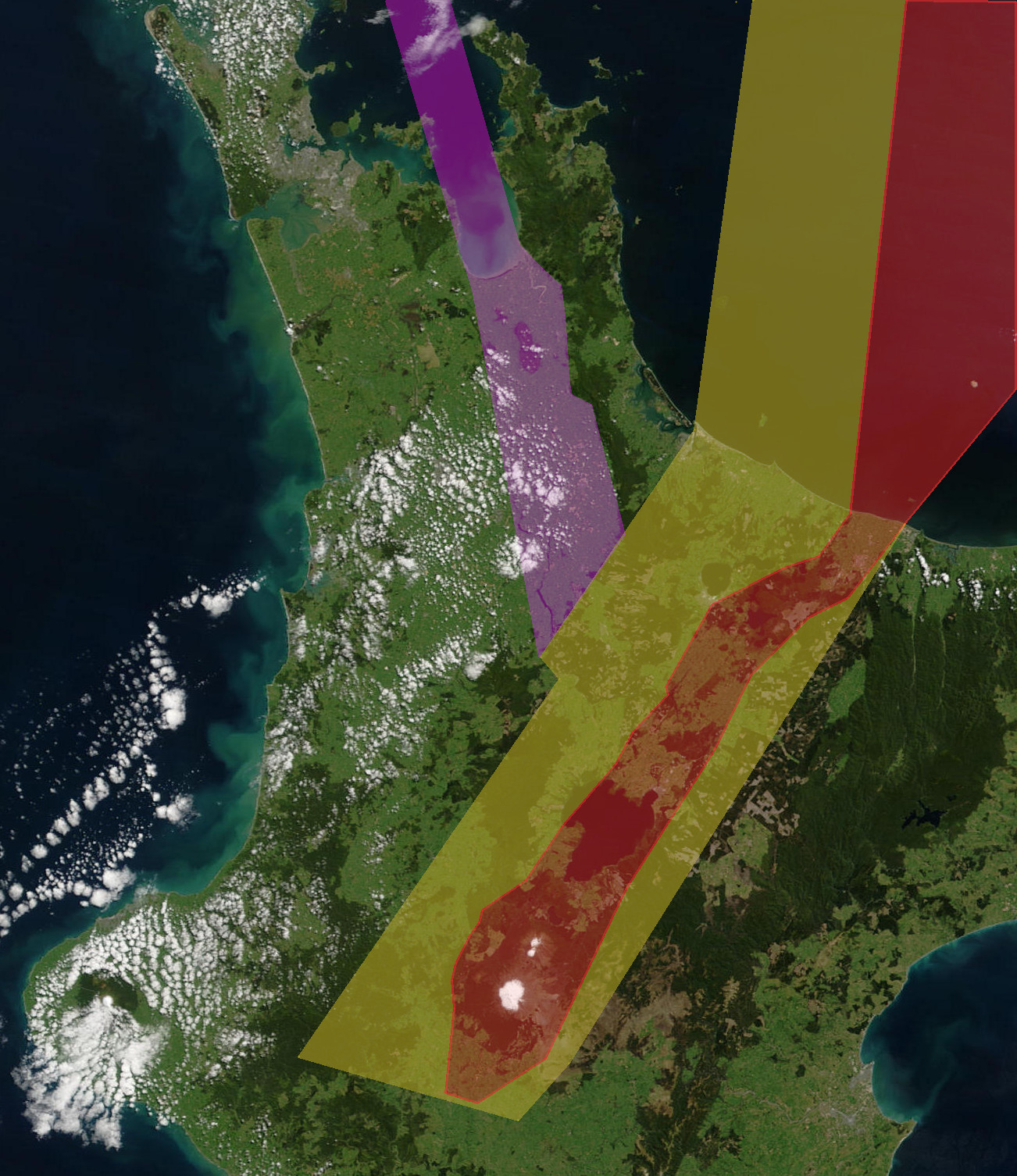
- Intra-arc continental rifts North Island, New Zealand. Purple approximately delineates the active Hauraki Rift, red the active modern Taupō Rift and yellow the inactive old Taupō Rift.
- Etymology: Hauraki Gulf
- Coordinates: 37°15′0″S 175°28′0″E (extends 37°30′S to at least 36°30′S)
- Country: New Zealand
- Region: North Island

Characteristics
- Segments: Multiple
- Length: 250 km (160 mi)
- Width: 25 km (16 mi)
- Displacement: 0.46 mm (0.018 in)/yr

Tectonics
- Plate: Indo-Australian
- Status: Active
- Earthquakes: Mainly tectonic
- Type: Intra-arc continental rift
- Movement: Possibly up to M_{w} 7.2-7.4
- Age: Miocene-Holocene
- Volcanic arc/belt: Coromandel volcanoes
- New Zealand geology database (includes faults)

The Hauraki Rift is an active NeS-to NWeSE-striking rift valley system in the North Island of New Zealand that has produced the Firth of Thames and the Hauraki Plains. It is approximately 25 kilometres (16 mi) wide and 250 kilometres (160 mi) long.

== Geology ==
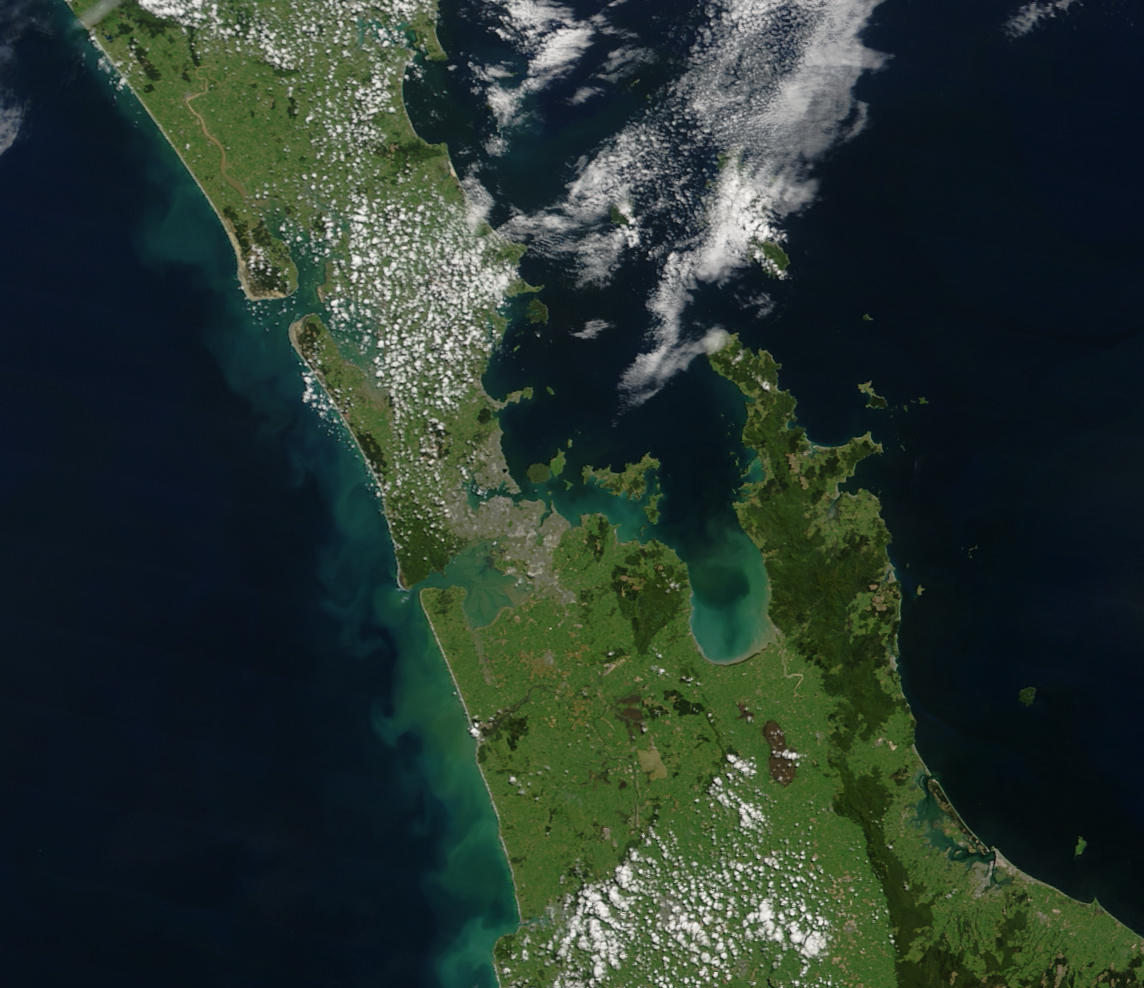
A true-colour image acquired by NASA's Terra satellite, on 23 October 2002. The Hauraki Rift extends north from the Hauraki Plains at the base of the large bay (the Firth of Thames) just to the lower right of centre. The sides of the rift valley containing the intra-rift fault are defined by the dark green forest outlines of the Coromandel and Kaimai Ranges to the east, and the Hunua Ranges to the west.

The rift valley in the north appears to be delimited in the west by the line of the Firth of Thames Fault and to the east by the Hauraki Fault. The mountains of the Coromandel (which include andesitic and basaltic back arc volcanoes) and Kaimai Range to the east and the Hunua Range to the west give it the appearance of a full graben although it has also been described as a simple structure of 2 to 3 half-grabens so the term Hauraki Graben for the low lying portions would be incorrect. However the apparent line in the south of the Firth of Thames Fault no longer follows the apparent horst structure to the west and some believe the line of the Waikato River after it leaves the old Taupō Rift gives a better guide to the western line of the rift as structures have been heavily modified in the last 26,000 years in the south, and the Waikato River historically used the graben in its route to the sea. The active intra-rift Kerepehi Fault in the southern portion of the Hauraki Rift is complex and has the potential for large earthquakes.

=== Structure ===
Initially between 10 and 5 million years ago the rift developed in a back arc region to the now extinct Coromandel volcanoes. It has a basement of mesozoic greywacke and argillite and at least two andesitic volcanoes erupted within it. To the north the rift is filled with 2.5–3 kilometres (1.6–1.9 mi) thick Tertiary and Quaternary terrestrial sediments and beyond Waiheke Island it opens up into an oceanic basin. Early work suggested the northern boundary might come ashore in Northland, near Whangārei and that the southern boundary while modified by events after the formation of the Mangakino caldera complex continued to be active. Work using geolocation on the Hauraki Rift reveals a widening rate of 0.9 mm (0.035 in)/year although some of the raw data suggests that at the Te Poi end it might be up to 1.5 mm (0.059 in)/year which would be consistent with this. However, in this region it is now dominated by the much more recent Taupō Rift (2 million years old at most) associated with the Taupō Volcanic Zone (TVZ) to which it is off-set by 60 degrees. TVZ eruptive output of 240,000 years ago, being Mamaku ignimbrite from the Rotorua caldera has filled in the far southern extremes.

=== Geothermal activity ===
Thermal springs along the rift edges and center are found throughout the region with a heat output of the order of 6.5MW in total.

=== Other Context ===
At the far side of the Coromandel Peninsula there is a parallel structure of Late Miocene/Quaternary origin extending north, that has been called the East Coromandel Rift. To the south east is the Tauranga Volcanic Centre which is likely related to activity in the old Taupō Volcanic Zone and the postulated Omanawa Caldera would have been at the intersection of the two rifts about 2 million years ago.
