= Geology and geomorphology of Kahurangi National Park =

Geology and geomorphology of a national park in New Zealand

Orientation map for faults near Kahurangi National Park
(red) Active faults
(dark grey) Selected inactive faults
(black) Antoki Fault
Click on map to enlarge it, and enable mouse over of fault names, noting that many known inactive faults are not shown and can be fault zones rather than the fault lines shown for diagrammatic simplicity.

Kahurangi National Park is geologically one of the oldest and most complex areas in New Zealand with basement rocks dominating the landscape. The Paleozoic Buller and Tākaka terranes, separated down the middle of the park by the Anatoki Fault, form the geological basement.

The Buller terrane contains Ordovician metasedimentary turbidites, extensively intruded by Late Devonian granitoids and to a lesser extent, Early Cretaceous granitoids. To the east the Tākaka terrane comprises an older sequence of Cambrian volcanic and volcaniclastic arc-related sedimentary rocks, and a prominent mélange unit. The oldest fossils found in New Zealand, trilobites, are present in the sedimentary rocks. Overlying the arc-related sequence is a Late Cambrian to Early Devonian passive margin succession of clastic and carbonate sedimentary rocks. The Tākaka terrane has been intruded by Late Devonian mafic/ultramafic rocks and Early Cretaceous granitoids. The Buller and Takaka terranes were amalgamated in the early Middle Devonian.

A regional unconformity separates Late Cretaceous and younger sedimentary rocks from the basement. Late Cretaceous to Early Eocene sediments were deposited in basins in the north of the park. After a period of erosion the Late Eocene saw deposition of coal measures followed by calcareous sediments and limestone in the Oligocene. Renewed tectonic activity in the Miocene-Pliocene resulted in emerging land and sediments becoming terrigenous. The rapid uplift of the Southern Alps in the Pliocene-Pleistocene led to substantial volumes of gravels being deposited, particularly in the Karamea district.

Ongoing tectonic activity caused by the convergence of the Pacific and Australian plates has resulted in a mountainous topography. Uplifted Early Ordovician limestone, extensively altered to marble, has led to significant examples of karst topography. Some of the longest and deepest cave systems found in the Southern Hemisphere are located in the park. Extensive glaciation during the Pleistocene created many “U” shaped valleys and glacial tarns. In a few places Oligocene limestone has been sculpted by water and ice to form the best examples of uplifted mesas in New Zealand. Landslides are a common feature in the steeper areas of the park and many were triggered by earthquakes. Within the park lies part of New Zealand’s deepest and most intensely deformed Paleogene-Neogene sedimentary basin.

== Overview of stratigraphy ==
In New Zealand basement rocks are divided broadly into Western and Eastern Provinces – the park is located in the Western Province.

The Western Province is subdivided into two tectonostratigraphic terranes: the Late Cambrian to Late Ordovician (c. 490 – c. 448 Ma) Buller terrane and the Middle Cambrian to Early Devonian (c. 510 – c. 410 Ma) Tākaka terrane. Near the middle of the park the terranes are separated by the inactive north-south trending Anatoki Fault which can be traced from the Wakamarama Range in the north of the park to about 30 km (19 mi) from the southern border of the park.

Sedimentary deposits cover about 20% of the park and date from Late Cretaceous (c. 80 Ma) to Holocene in age. Cover rocks are found mainly in fault-controlled depressions and on top of flat-topped basement ridges. Unconsolidated deposits such as gravels, sand and slope debris are mostly restricted to the Karamea district, inland Mōkihinui River catchment and valleys within the mountainous interior of the park.

== Basement rocks ==
=== Buller terrane ===
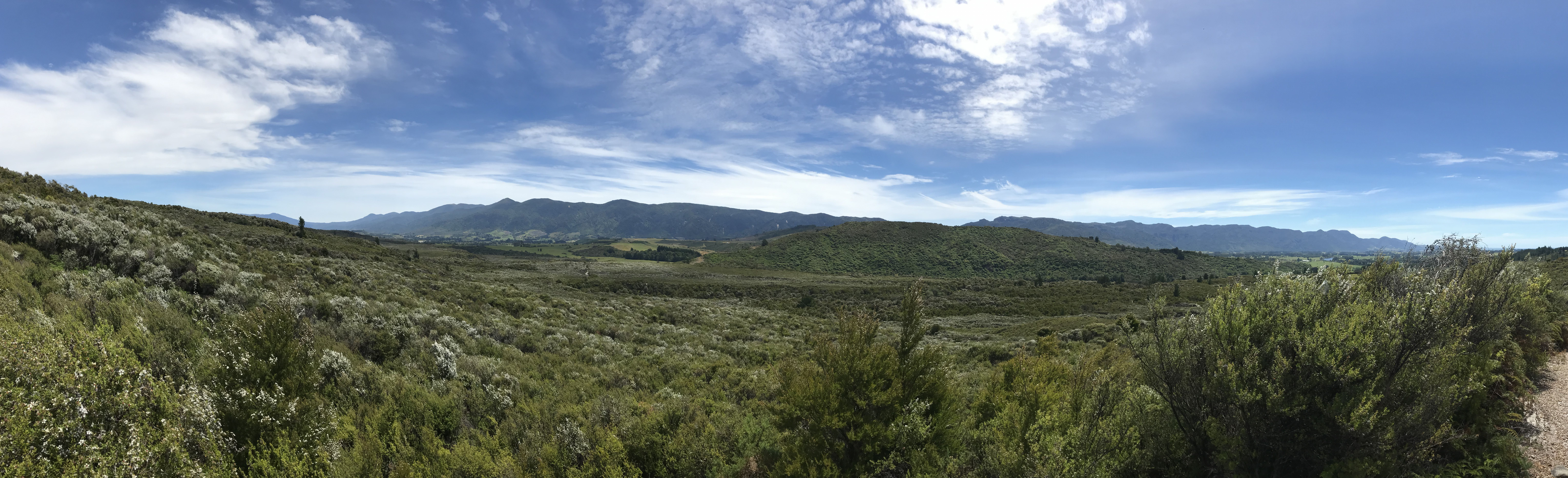
Wakamarama and Burnett Range

The Buller terrane extends from the west coast to alongside the Anatoki Fault. The fault is a narrow zone of breccia, mylonite and cataclasite with fragments of Ordovician limestone commonly present along the fault zone.

The oldest rocks are Late Cambrian to Early Ordovician (c. 490 – c. 485 Ma) continent-derived quartz-rich turbidites, collectively called the Greenland Group. The Greenland Group passes conformably up into the Golden Bay Group which contains black shales as well as similar rock types to the Greenland Group. Graptolite fossils ranging in age from Early Ordovician to Late Ordovician (c. 480 – c. 448 Ma) are present in the black shales. The combined Greenland Group and Golden Bay Group sedimentary sequence is at least 9 km (5.6 mi) thick; has been folded, faulted and undergone low-grade greenschist facies metamorphism.

About 2–3 km west of the Anatoki Fault is the Fenella Fault Zone, a zone of folding and faulting that extends from the southern end of the Wakamarama Range to just north of Mount Patriarch. It has been offset in several places by east-west trending faults. Segments can reach up to 700 m (2,300 ft) wide but generally the zone is 100–200 m wide. It contains steeply plunging folds in strongly sheared quartzite, sandstone and siltstone derived from Golden Bay Group rocks. The zone appears to be the scar left behind by a stratigraphic excision of unknown tectonic origin.

Intruding the metamorphosed sedimentary sequence in the western half of the Buller terrane is the Karamea Batholith comprising late Middle Devonian to Early Carboniferous (c. 385 – c. 354 Ma) granitoids. The bulk of the granitoids mapped in the park are known as the Karamea Suite granite emplaced c. 371 – c. 368 Ma. Karamea Suite granite is predominantly a coarse-grained biotite granite with large pink euhedral crystals of potassium feldspar. The Karamea Suite covers a large area from Kahurangi Point almost continuously to the Mōkihinui River valley in the southwest of the park, and to the southern boundary of the park about 5 km (3.1 mi) northwest of Murchison. Sedimentary rocks overlie much of the Karamea Suite and Greenland Group in the southern third of the park.

Early Cretaceous (c. 126 – c. 105 Ma) Separation Point Suite granite, consisting of biotite granite and granodiorite, also intrudes the Buller terrane. Several plutons intrude the Karamea Batholith, metasedimentary rocks south of the Wakamarama Range and the far southwest of the park. The largest of the plutons is roughly 14 km (8.7 mi) long and 7 km (4.3 mi) wide and is located in the middle of the Tasman Mountains.

=== Tākaka terrane ===
The Tākaka terrane is a complex sequence of Middle Cambrian to Late Cambrian (c. 510 – c. 490 Ma) igneous and volcaniclastic arc-related rocks mixed with sediments from the southeastern margin of Gondwana, and a ā margin sequence from Late Cambrian to Early Devonian (c. 490 – c. 410 Ma) consisting of clastic and calcareous sedimentary rocks. The volcanic arc-related sequence, dominated by the Haupiri Group and Devil River Volcanics Group, is largely confined to the western part of the terrane between the Anatoki Fault and the Devil River Fault some 15 km (9.3 mi) further to the east. The terrane is structurally complex with up to 11 fault-bounded slices in the arc-related sequence and two in the passive margin sequence. The fault slices, with their different stratigraphies, appear to have juxtaposed parts of the arc-related sequence that were originally some distance apart. Three of the fault slices contain broken formation and mélange and together are mapped as the Balloon Melange. All pre-Devonian rocks have undergone low to middle greenschist facies metamorphism.

==== Volcanic arc-related sequence ====
The oldest rocks in the park are represented by the Junction Formation consisting of Middle Cambrian (c. 510 – c. 506 Ma) turbiditic sandstones, siltstones and conglomerate debris. Outcrops occur as narrow north-south slices intersecting the east end of the Cobb Valley and a slice located about 10 km (6.2 mi) northwest of the western end of the Cobb Reservoir. Eroded Junction Formation material is found in rocks of the younger Haupiri Group.

===== Haupiri Group =====
The oldest rocks dated by fossils in the Tākaka terrane, and in New Zealand, are found within the Haupiri Group. Calcareous siltstone and conglomerate beds contain trilobites of possible Middle Cambrian age (c. 506 Ma). These beds are confined to a small area about 3–5 km (1.9–3.1 mi) south of the Cobb Reservoir where they are interbedded with Mataki Volcanics.

The Haupiri Group is best represented by the Tasman Formation in a north to south slice at the west end of the Cobb Valley. This slice is dominated by siliceous siltstone and sandstone, with lenses of limestone and debris-flow conglomerate. The olistolithic limestone lenses contain trilobites, brachiopods and molluscs of late Middle Cambrian age (c. 506 – c. 503 Ma). Overlying the Tasman Formation is the granule to boulder-sized Lockett Conglomerate up to 500 m (1,600 ft) thick containing clasts of volcanic and ultramafic rocks, gabbro, granitoid, quartzite, limestone and sandstone including sandstone derived from Junction Formation. The conglomerate is interpreted to be a fan delta deposit in a shallow marine or possibly terrestrial environment. Other fault slices that contain volcaniclastic conglomerate, sandstone and siltstone generally date from late Middle Cambrian to early Late Cambrian (c. 503 – c. 495 Ma).

Haupiri Group sediments were derived from both continental and volcanic arc sources in a back-arc basin intra-oceanic arc setting. The earliest Haupiri Group sediments are interbedded in their upper part with the back-arc basalts of the Mataki Volcanics while the youngest Haupiri Group sediments overlie and are interbedded with the youngest Benson Volcanics.

===== Devil River Volcanics Group =====
The Devil River Volcanics Group includes all volcanic and plutonic rocks of Middle to Late Cambrian age (c. 510 – c. 490 Ma). The volcanic and plutonic rocks interbed and intertongue with sediments of the Haupiri Group and are grouped into the following (earliest to latest) formations:

1. Mataki Volcanics dominated by basaltic flows, pillows and pillow breccias, volcaniclastic breccia, conglomerate and sandstone and interpreted to represent back-arc basin tholeiitic basalts. Mataki Volcanics are interbedded with early Haupiri Group sediments up to early Benson Volcanics and Tasman Formation.
2. Cobb Igneous Complex contains gabbro and serpentinised ultramafic rocks. Interpreted to be layered shallow-level intrusions of boninitic andesites in a back-arc environment. Numerous late-stage mafic and felsic dikes intrude the gabbro and ultramafic rocks. Cobb Igneous Complex intrudes early Haupiri Group sediments and lower Mataki Volcanics.
3. Benson Volcanics consists of volcaniclastic breccia conglomerate and sandstone, tuffs and flows representing at least 9 volcanic suites that generally changed with time from basaltic to andesitic with some dacite and rhyolite at the top of the stratigraphic succession. They were erupted in a subduction-related setting. Geochemistry of the rocks suggests deposits formed on and adjacent to an island arc. The earliest Benson Volcanics are interbedded with upper Mataki Volcanics while the youngest Benson Volcanics are overlain by and interbedded with the youngest Haupiri Group sediments.

At around the latest Cambrian to early Ordovician (c. 485 Ma) dolerite dikes and sills intruded virtually all of the fault slices. Their geochemistry is similar to modern rift-related volcanic rocks.

===== Balloon Melange =====
Three fault slices are characterised by diamictite, broken formation and melange: Balloon Slice, roughly 20 km (12 mi) long and up to 4 km (2.5 mi) wide intersecting the Cobb Reservoir; Anatoki Slice beside the northern half of the Anatoki Fault; and the Tunnel Slice at the eastern end of the Cobb Reservoir. The bulk of the melange is derived from Junction Formation material with additional material from the Tasman Formation, Lockett Conglomerate and Devil River Volcanics Group. It includes exotic blocks from a few metres up to possibly 3 km (1.9 mi) in length of chert, limestone, conglomerate, siltstone, volcanic sandstone, andesite, basalt and mafic intrusives set in a sparse to abundant matrix of blue-grey sandy to silty mudstone. The matrix is interpreted to be derived from turbiditic layers of sandstone and mudstone from the Junction Formation. Blocks from the latest Cambrian to Devonian passive margin sequence are absent and the melange is therefore inferred to have formed in the Late Cambrian.

Adjacent to and mostly west of the Devil River Fault is a zone of ductile shear 1–1.5 km (0.62–0.93 mi) wide mapped as the Waingaro Schist Zone. It is dominated by volcanic-derived greenschist. Parent rocks include Haupiri Group, Devil River Volcanics Group, Balloon Melange and Middle to Late Ordovician passive margin calcareous and silica-rich sedimentary rocks.

==== Passive margin sequence ====
The Late Cambrian to Early Devonian (c. 490 – c. 410 Ma) passive margin sequence forms a "covering" succession of carbonates and silica-rich sedimentary rocks. It generally lies to the east of the arc sequence. The passive margin sequence extends from the Wakamarama Range down to west of Upper Tākaka; from Tākaka Hill it follows the Arthur Range down to Mount Patriarch and Mount Owen in the Marino Mountains. There is also a narrow north-south strip of this sequence west of the Cobb Reservoir. At the southern end of the Anatoki Fault the passive margin sequence surrounds a pinched-out arc sequence.

The oldest rocks are the Late Cambrian to Early Ordovician (c. 490 – c. 478 Ma) Mount Patriarch Group consisting of quartz-mica siltstone, volcaniclastic sandstone and granule conglomerate. This sequence grades up into calcareous siltstone, muddy limestone and carbonaceous shale. Trilobites and conodonts are found throughout the Mount Patriarch Group.

The onset of carbonate deposition began at the end of the Cambrian to Early Ordovician and led to the Mount Arthur Group succession of carbonaceous and calcareous mudstone, sandstone, and bands of micritic limestone with fossil fragments. Siliceous bands and nodules are present in some areas. The limestone within the group has been extensively altered to marble. Conodonts and trilobites found in the base of the Mount Arthur Group limestone date from the very Late Cambrian to Early Ordovician, while everywhere the top of the limestone appears to be Middle Ordovician (c. 470 – c. 464 Ma).

Overlying the Mount Arthur Group limestone is siliceous siltstone, quartz sandstone, calcareous siltstone and sometimes carbonaceous shale and limestone. Outcrops mostly occur to the east of older passive margin deposits. Graptolites indicate a Late Ordovician age (c. 453 – c. 445 Ma). Late Ordovician corals and crinoids have also been found west of the Tākaka Valley.

Following the Mount Arthur Group is the Ellis Group comprising thin to thick beds of quartz-rich sandstone, quartzite and siliceous siltstone. Outcrops occur mainly west of Tākaka Valley, south of Upper Tākaka; and in the Wangapeka River area south of the Arthur Range. A few brachiopods found in the upper part of the group indicate a Middle to Late Silurian age (c. 433 – c. 425 Ma), and a possible end of the Silurian age (c. 423 – c. 419 Ma) based on brachiopods and corals found just east of Hailes Knob in the Arthur Range. A north to southeast band of schist with bedded quartzite and metavolcanic bands lies about 1 km east of Parapara Peak. It is thought to be the stratigraphic equivalent of the Silurian Ellis Group quartzite and overlies Late Ordovician Mount Arthur marble.

Mudstone and fine-grained sandstone with minor limestone and conglomerate make up the Baton Formation above the Ellis Group. It is confined to the southeast flank of the Arthur Range in the Skeet and Baton River area. Brachiopods, conodonts, bivalves, trilobites and corals in shellbeds at several horizons indicate an Early Devonian age (c. 418 – c. 410 Ma). The contact between the Ellis Group and Baton Formation has been interpreted as an unconformity but it may be conformable and gradational.

Overlying the passive margin sequence is an isolated outcrop of Permian to Triassic metasedimentary rocks, the Parapara Group, located in a narrow fault-bounded north-south exposure ending at Parapara Peak. It is approximately 12 km (7.5 mi) long up to 1.3 km (0.81 mi) wide and the sequence is at least 500 m (1,600 ft) thick and probably lying unconformably on older basement of unknown age. The greenschist-to-amphibolite facies metamorphosed sequence includes basal schist and slate overlain by conglomerate, fossiliferous pebbly sandstone, quartzites, slate and quartz sandstone. It is possible the age range extends from the Carboniferous to Middle Triassic. Dropstones are present, mainly below and above the fossiliferous sandstone, and are interpreted as ice-rafted. The Middle Permian (c. 270 – c. 264 Ma) fossils are predominantly bryozoans, brachiopods and molluscs. These fossils suggest a close correlation with Tasmania and eastern Australia around the Middle Permian when continental-arc derived sediments were deposited in a mid-shelf cool water environment.

Along the eastern margin of the Wharepapa / Arthur Range, between Tākaka Hill and the southern end of the Arthur Range, lies the c. 367 – c. 364 Ma Riwaka Complex. Its elongated exposure is offset in several places by faults. It is composed of ultramafic layered igneous rocks, typically diorite, gabbro and pyroxenite. The complex intrudes Late Ordovician Mount Arthur Group, Ellis Group and Baton Formation. Its age is similar to the age of the Karamea Suite granite and shares geochemical similarities with the diorites of the Karamea Suite.

The Riwaka Complex is itself intruded along its eastern margin by Early Cretaceous Separation Point Suite granite with exposures just within the park boundary east of the Arthur Range. A large area of Separation Point Suite granite, some 250 km^{2} (97 sq mi), is exposed in the Hope and Lookout Ranges south of the Wangapeka River. A few small outcrops of Separation Point Suite granite occur about 10 km (6.2 mi) west-northwest of Collingwood, near the park border about 9 km (5.6 mi) southwest of Collingwood and 4 km (2.5 mi) east of Parapara Peak.

== Tectonic history of basement rocks ==
Buller terrane sedimentary rocks were formed during the Ordovician adjacent to a continental landmass inferred to be the eastern Australia-Antarctica segment of Gondwana. A significant tectonic event, possibly during the Late Ordovician to Early Silurian (c. 450 – c. 440 Ma), led to folding with well developed cleavage and low-grade metamorphism of the Ordovician rocks. The Fenella Fault Zone is of unknown tectonic origin but the deformation which produced the zone pre-dates emplacement of the Early Cretaceous Separation Point Suite granite.

The older Cambrian rocks of the Tākaka terrane formed on and adjacent to a volcanic oceanic-arc and back-arc basin created by the subduction of the paleo-Pacific plate under an oceanic Gondwana plate margin. The continuous evolution of the oceanic-arc back-arc system lasted c. 20–25 million years until the Late Cambrian. Sediments, partly from Gondwana, were interbedded with volcanic and intrusive sequences from the arc and back-arc basin while subduction occurred. Most of the eruptive activity occurred below sea level during this period. Towards the end of the Cambrian, at about the time subduction ended, the whole sequence was tectonically overprinted by the formation of the Balloon Melange. Fragments from all parts of the Cambrian arc assemblage were incorporated into the Balloon Melange during a period of compressional deformation of an accretionary wedge. The widespread Balloon Melange event correlates with the Ross-Delamerian orogeny that occurred in eastern Australia and Antarctica at about the same time. Post-collision of the accretionary wedge with Gondwana saw the intrusion of earliest Ordovician dolerite dikes and sills as the tectonic regime changed from compressional to extensional when that part of the southeast Gondwana margin became passive.

The histories and tectonic settings of the Buller and Tākaka terranes suggests they were originally apart – perhaps hundreds of kilometres apart. An early phase of transcurrent movement along the Anatoki Fault was followed by formation of thrust faults and fault slices in the Tākaka terrane. A modern analogy is the transcurrent movement along the Alpine Fault which has displaced crustal blocks up to 480 km (300 mi) in the last 23 million years. Amalgamation of the two terranes post-dates deposition of the Silurian Ellis Group quartzite and probably the early Devonian Baton Formation but occurred before emplacement of the Middle to Late Devonian Karamea Suite granite and Riwaka Complex. It is possible the Karamea Suite and Riwaka Complex were emplaced within an extensional back-arc setting similar to the current tectonic setting of the Taupo Volcanic Zone of New Zealand.

The youngest basement sedimentary rocks, the Permian Parapara Group, reflect a direct link to Gondwana because they were deposited where we see them now whereas all other rocks of that age in New Zealand are found in terranes that were brought to the southeastern Gondwana margin from locations elsewhere. This group was deposited as cover strata on the Gondwana basement in the East Australia/Tasmania/Zealandia sector of Gondwana.

The final period of subduction along the Zealandia margin of Gondwana occurred in the Early Cretaceous which saw the emplacement of the Separation Point Suite granite. Subduction ended c. 105 – c. 100 Ma possibly as a result of the thick basaltic Hikurangi Plateau moving into the Gondwana-Zealandia subduction zone and effectively blocking or choking the subduction zone. However, the timing of subduction termination is debated. A recent study using plate reconstruction software (GPlates) with marine paleomagnetic anomaly data and recent plate kinematic data, suggests subduction continued until at least 85 Ma along the entire East Gondwana margin. Subduction ended when there was a change in relative plate motion from westerly to northerly between the paleo-Pacific plate and East Gondwana.

== Cover rocks ==
Sedimentary rocks of Late Cretaceous (c. 80 Ma) age and younger cover about 20% of the park. They are found in the northern and southern areas of the park, inland from the western boundary in several places and a discontinuous narrow band running roughly from Upper Tākaka to about 20 km (12 mi) east of Karamea in the Garibaldi Ridge area.

=== Late Cretaceous ===
The Late Cretaceous (c. 80 – c. 70 Ma) Rakopi Formation is located about 9 km (5.6 mi) west of Collingwood and extends the entire width of the narrow park extension up to the most eastern point of Whanganui Inlet. From Pākawau to Pūponga at the northern most tip of the park the younger North Cape Formation (c. 70 – c. 65 Ma) overlies the Rakopi Formation. Together these formations make up the Pākawau Group. The Rakopi Formation is predominantly terrestrial sandstone interbedded with carbonaceous mudstone and thin coal seams. At the very southern edge of the outcrop area a base unit of conglomerate with cobble-sized basement clasts is exposed. The Rakopi Formation represents mainly swampy and flood plain deposits. The North Cape Formation is mainly shallow marine sandstone interbedded with siltstone with minor conglomerate and coal seams near the top at Pūponga. Deposition environment is interpreted as near-shore terrestrial occasionally flooded by the sea.

=== Paleocene ===
There is only one small exposure of Paleocene rocks within the park – the Farewell Formation (c. 65 – c. 55 Ma) at Kahurangi Point. The Farewell Formation consists of quartzofeldspathic sandstone and pebbly conglomerate that formed on a braided floodplain or meandering river system. Deposition of the Farewell Formation occurred throughout the Paleocene into the Pākawau Basin which hosts the Pākawau Group.

=== Eocene ===
A widespread unconformity within the park separates the Farewell Formation from the younger Brunner Coal Measures (c. 40 – c. 34 Ma). The period in the stratigraphic record, effectively from about 55 to 40 Ma, was tectonically quiet and erosional. A subdued topography led to deposition of the Brunner Coal Measures consisting of non-marine quartz sandstone, conglomerate, carbonaceous shale and coal seams. Outcrops occur in synclinal structures, such as inland from the Heaphy River and the northern end of the Murchison basin (northern end of Matiri Range), and on plateaus such as the Garibaldi Ridge about 20–27 km east of Karamea. The largest outcrop by area, roughly 30–35 km^{2} (12–14 sq mi), lies in fault-controlled depressions between the Skeet and Wangapeka Rivers at the southern end of the Arthur Range. Several small outcrops occur to the east and west-southwest of the Permian Parapara Group. In the south of the park is the slightly younger Maruia Formation (c. 38 – c. 34 Ma) containing mudstone and quartzofeldspathic sandstone with minor conglomerate and thin coal seams. Maruia Formation overlies Brunner Coal Measures in the Garibaldi Ridge area and further south mostly lies unconformably on basement rocks.

=== Oligocene ===
Subsidence of the park region during the Oligocene led to deposition of the ā Nile Group (c. 30 – c. 23 Ma). The Nile Group has been split into two major groupings:

1. Platform facies (usually < 100 m (330 ft) thick); bioclastic limestone and muddy limestone formed on a stable continental shelf.
2. Basinal facies (usually > 100 m (330 ft) thick); predominantly muddy limestone interbedded with calcareous sandstone and mudstone, formed in rapidly subsiding basins.

Nile Group outcrops are found in fault-controlled depressions, such as along the Pikikiruna and Karamea faults and bluff-forming areas within the middle of the park. These outcrops are the eroded remnants of the platform facies. The basinal facies, mapped as Matiri Formation, occur in the south of the park in the Matiri Range and Murchison Basin. The present limited distribution of Oligocene sediments is due to later uplift and erosion.

=== Miocene ===
The Early to Middle Miocene (c. 23 – c. 13 Ma) Lower Blue Bottom Group, consisting of blue-grey calcareous mudstone and muddy sandstone, frequently outcrops next to Nile Group limestone. The Lower Blue Bottom Group is mostly preserved in isolated fault-controlled depressions. Outcrops occur along the Ōpārara River, northeast of the Little Wanganui River, along the southern margin of the Wakamarama Range and on the north side of the Karamea Fault. In the south of the park the Lower Blue Bottom Group is mapped as the Mangles Formation overlying Matiri Formation. The Mangles Formation, with alternating sandstone and mudstone, passes upward into more massive shallow-water sandstone in the Murchison Basin. About 10 km (6.2 mi) west of the Matiri Range lies a north-south narrow outcrop of Mangles Formation extending to the southern boundary of the park. Its composition is dominated more by calcareous mudstone than sandstone.

Middle Miocene to Middle Pliocene (c. 13 – c. 3 Ma) marine sediments, mapped as Upper Blue Bottom Group, are found only in the Karamea district. Consisting of blue-grey muddy sandstone with shallow-water fossils with a change to massive fine-grained sandstone at about the Miocene-Pliocene boundary. The massive sandstone is often weathered rusty brown in outcrop.

=== Pliocene to present ===
Overlying the Upper Blue Bottom Group in the Karamea district, a few km south of Karamea and similar distance north of Karamea, are outcrops of Late Pliocene to Early Pleistocene (c. 3 – c. 2 Ma) Old Man Gravel Group conglomerate. The conglomerate contains weathered clasts of quartzofeldspathic sandstone, schist, granite and other igneous and sedimentary rocks as well as some interbedded sandstone. Recent unconsolidated deposits consisting of gravel and sands are mostly restricted to the Karamea district and in rivers and streams dissecting the interior of the southern half of the park. Landslides are common in the steeper areas of the park with many of the landslides triggered by earthquakes, such as the 1929 M_{w} 7.3 Murchison earthquake. A few of the landslides have dammed rivers to form small lakes.

== Tectonic history of cover rocks ==
Continental rifting began throughout much of future Zealandia after subduction along the Pacific eastern margin of Gondwana ended around 105–100 Ma. Uplifting of the crust due to thermal heating led to erosion from the top and the filling of grabens and half-grabens while at the same time the rifting process stretched and thinned the crust from below. With the onset of seafloor spreading between Southern Zealandia and West Antarctica, and in the southern Tasman Sea at c. 83 Ma, Zealandia gradually cooled and subsided as it drifted away from the Tasman spreading ridge and West Antarctica. Northern Zealandia finally separated from Australia at c. 62 Ma, Tasman Sea spreading ceased c. 52 Ma and Zealandia had become fully separated from Australia. Marine transgression continued through the late Cretaceous to Middle Eocene but much of central Zealandia where the park would have been located remained above sea level.

Erosion in the park was the order of the day from Late Cretaceous to Middle Eocene with deposition limited to terrigenous sediments, derived from Tākaka terrane basement rocks, deposited into the Pākawau Basin. Erosion continued until the topography became subdued leading to deposition of Middle to Late Eocene coal measures in a swampy-estuarine environment. Subsidence continued and by the end of the Oligocene to Early Miocene almost the whole park was submerged and sediments became calcareous with widespread limestone deposits. From Early to Middle Miocene saw a change from carbonaceous to terrigenous muddy sediments as the Hikurangi subduction zone at the Australian and Pacific plate boundary propagated northeast of New Zealand. The Alpine Fault began to develop c. 25 – c. 23 Ma in central Zealandia and had linked up to the Hikurangi subduction margin by c. 15 Ma. Oblique compressional deformation in central Zealandia led to reactivation of basement faults, new faults, inversion of old basins (e.g Pākawau) and subsequent uplift and erosion in parts of the park. In the southern half of the park sediments became more clastic reflecting a shallowing water environment but subsidence remained rapid in the Murchison Basin until Late Miocene.

Late Miocene to Pliocene marine sediments were increasingly confined to the west of the park in the Karamea area. In the south the Murchison Basin rapidly filled in and from c. 7 Ma was subjected to compression and uplift associated with the Alpine Fault. Rapid uplift of the Southern Alps in the late Pliocene to Pleistocene led to a flood of gravel deposits in the Karamea district. During the Pleistocene (2.6 – 0.12 Ma) there were many ice ages that resulted in periods of ice-capped areas and significantly glaciated landforms such as in the central Tasman Mountains and Arthur Range.

Currently active faults are to the south of the park. The Glasgow Fault is a reverse fault near the south western boundary of the Park. The White Creek Fault is another reverse fault in the southern portion of the park with a recurrence interval estimated to be between 10,000 and 20,000 years. This fault was responsible for the M_{w} 7.3 1929 Murchison earthquake. The M_{w} 7.1 1968 Inangahua earthquake had a epicentre a few miles south of the park.

== Geomorphology ==
The park is mostly mountainous with the Tasman Mountains dominating the central area of the park west of the Tākaka River. They rise to approximately concordant summits between 1,600 and 1,875 m (5,249 and 6,152 ft) (Mount Owen) with the surface defined by these summits gently dipping to the west. The surface may be the Late Cretaceous to Middle Eocene erosion surface, also known as the Waipounamu Erosion Surface, which saw the levelling of the pre-Cenozoic rocks in the park. Exhumed remnants of the erosion surface occur at Gouland Downs (15 km (9.3 mi) southeast of Kahurangi Point), Gunner Downs (8 km (5.0 mi) southeast of the Heaphy River mouth) and Mount Arthur Tablelands about 5 km to the northwest of Mount Arthur. Late Devonian Karamea Suite Granite exposed in the Gouland Downs is cut by numerous faults and regional joint sets have created a mesh-like topographic pattern. The old erosion surface also occurs under Eocene to Miocene sequences such as in the Matiri Range in the south of the park. In the Hope Range the Cretaceous Separation Point Suite granite plateau has impressive tor features.

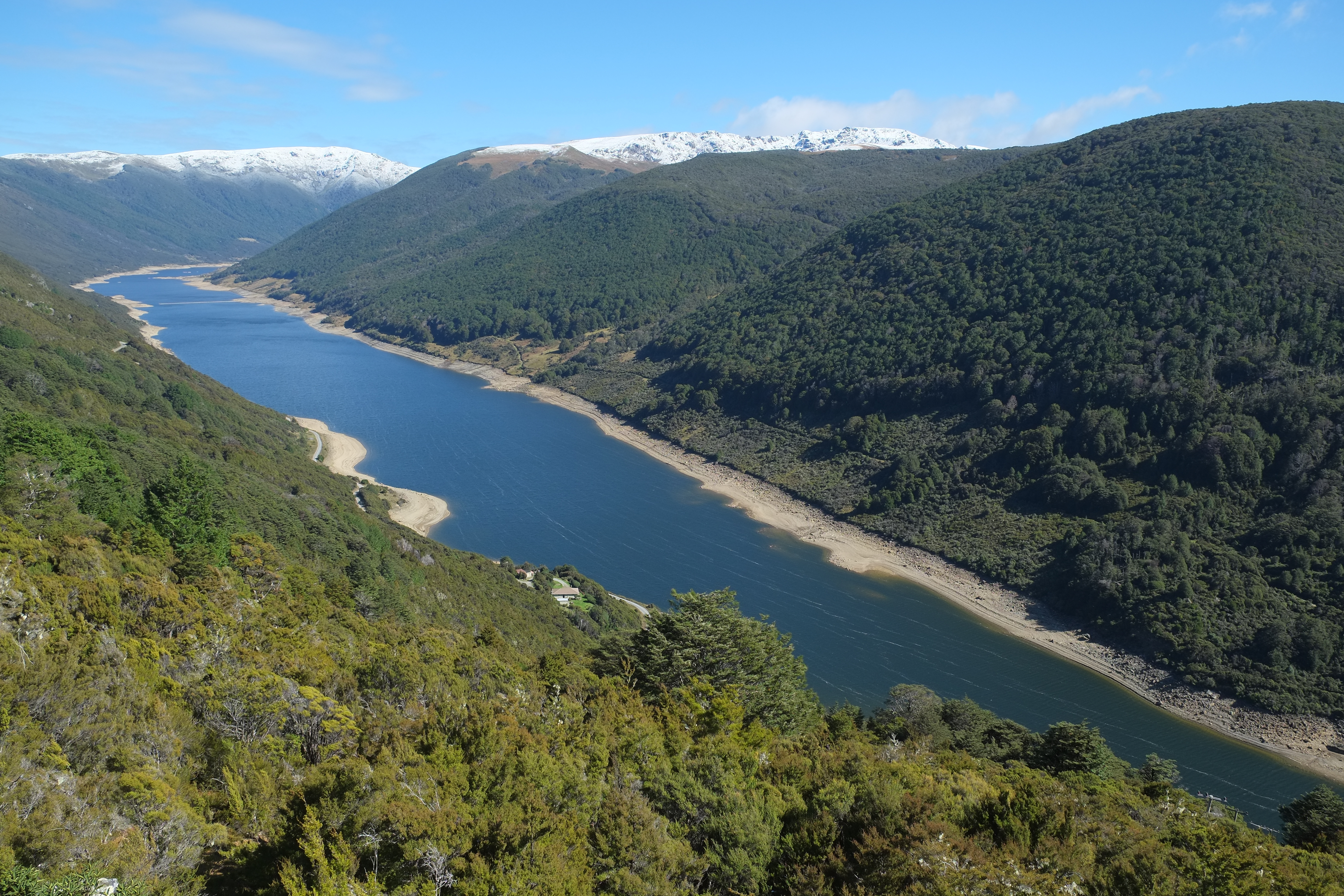
Cobb valley in autumn

Extensive glaciation of the Tasman Mountains during the Pleistocene has left many classic ”U” shaped valleys with hanging valley tributaries and glacial tarns — the Cobb Valley (approximately 17 km (11 mi) long) is a prime example. A number of low-rounded knobs of bedrock protrude from the valley floor near the head of the hydro lake in the Cobb Valley. These are small roche moutonnées and one of them, known as Trilobite Rock, contains some of the oldest fossils found in New Zealand dating to Middle Cambrian (c. 506 – c. 503 Ma) in age.

Downcutting into the Waipounamu Surface by glaciers and rivers has formed a complex, youthful landscape of ridges and valleys and some impressive gorges. Where this landscape meets the west coast formidable cliffs are found between Kahurangi Point and the Heaphy River. Landslides are a common feature of the steeper country in the park with many of them triggered by earthquakes. Some of these landslides have dammed rivers to form lakes. For example Lake Stanley (2.2 km (1.4 mi) long) was formed when a spur of Mount Snowdon collapsed into the Stanley River during the Murchison earthquake. This earthquake, and to a lesser extent the 1968 M_{w} 7.1 Inangahua earthquake, heavily scarred the landscape in the centre and south of the park.

=== Caves and karst ===
The extensive marble outcrops in the Arthur Range and Mount Owen in the Marino Mountains provide some of the best examples in the Southern Hemisphere of glaciated surface and karst topography characterised by fluted rock outcrops, sinkholes (tomos) and caves. Extensive underground karst passageways have formed in the 500–1500 m thick Mount Arthur Group marble. Mount Owen contains the longest cave network in New Zealand – the Bulmer Cavern at 74 km (46 mi). Mount Arthur has the deepest cave system in the Southern Hemisphere – the Stormy Pot-Nettlebed Cave at 1,174 m (3,852 ft) deep. Most of the caves high up in the marble mountains have dry passageways often decorated with stalagmites, stalactites, straws and helectites. Mount Owen's Bohemia Cave is a notable example. As the area rose through tectonic compression during the last 2 million years, groundwaters dissolved out new cave passages along joint planes leading to the immense height difference between the dry upper levels of the cave networks and their resurgence levels hundreds of metres lower. The Riuwaka Resurgence near Takaka Hill is a notable example.

In the Bulmer Cavern system partial remains of a crested moa were found in 1987 and in 2011 were radiocarbon dated at 1396–1442 CE making it the youngest moa yet found from a natural site in New Zealand. This species of moa survived for about 100 years after Polynesian colonisation began in the late 13th to early 14th century.

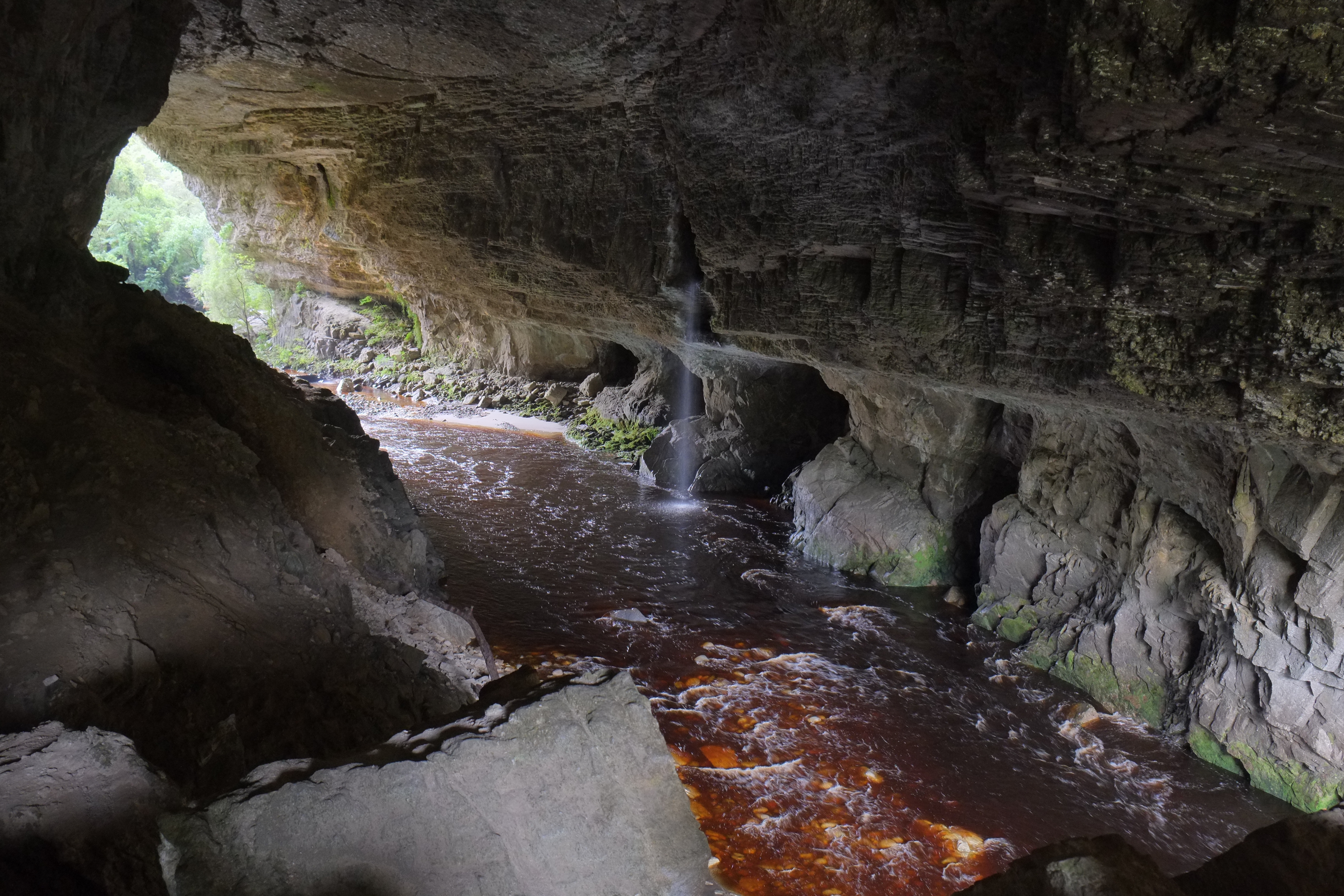
Ōpārara Arch, with Ōpārara River below coloured a reddish brown by natural tannins

The Ōpārara Arch is a notable example of an arch made of limestone although technically it is a natural bridge as it was formed by water erosion. It is located about 23 km (14 mi) northeast of Karamea in the upper Ōpārara River valley. It is the largest natural arch in Australasia at 43 m (141 ft) high, up to 79 m (259 ft) wide and 220 m (720 ft) long. The Ōpārara River flows southward for 20 km (12 mi) along the contact between Oligocene Nile Group limestone sitting on Devonian Karamea Suite granite before heading west to the coast. The limestone accumulated c. 30 Ma as a thick shell bank on top of an eroded surface of granite. Thick mud deposits then buried the shell bank and water percolated through the shell bed recrystallising the shell's calcite to form a relatively hard limestone. This sequence was uplifted and the mudstone eroded away during the last 7 million years. As the Ōpārara River valley was forming rainwater filtered through cracks in the limestone and dissolved out a cave network along the contact between the limestone and underlying granite. Eventually the caves coalesced and captured most of the valley's drainage to become part of the Oparara River. The river both dissolved and eroded the caves wider undercutting the roof supports resulting in progressive roof collapse – leaving behind the arches seen today.

Further up the valley from the Ōpārara Arch is the Honeycomb Hill Cave, best known for its fossil bird bones. Many specimens of New Zealand's extinct flightless birds, including moa, fell into or got washed into the cave and then preserved by burial in sediment or by getting coated in secondary calcite deposition. Many of the bird bones date back some 20,000 years BP. Bones of native frogs and lizards as well as 40 different land snail species add to the significant scientific importance of this cave.

=== Uplifted limestone mesas ===
In two places there are striking examples of large uplifted mesas, Garibaldi Ridge around 25 km (16 mi) east of Karamea, and two mesas located in the Matiri Range: the Devil's Dining Table and the Thousand Acre Plateau 3–4 km (1.9–2.5 mi) to the south of the Devil's Dining Table. The Matiri Range mesas are capped by Oligocene to early Miocene Matiri Formation limestone. During the Miocene the area continued to subside with up to 2 km (6,600 ft) of mud accumulating on top of the limestone. From c. 7 Ma the park region underwent uplift as the Australia and Pacific plates converged obliquely. As the area got lifted above sea level the soft mudstone was eroded away but the harder limestone was more resistant to erosion resulting in the formation of steep bluffs. During the last ice age water and ice eroded cirques into the limestone at the head of valley glaciers. The Garibaldi Ridge is similar except the capping limestone is Oligocene Nile Group limestone.

=== Longford Syncline ===
Just to the north of Longford, 4 km (2.5 mi) east of Murchison, a narrow section of the park about 2 km (1.2 mi) wide extends around 11 km (6.8 mi) north along the Blue Cliffs Ridge. The ridge is the western limb of the Longford Syncline. It is the most prominent part of one of New Zealand's deepest and most intensely deformed Cenozoic basins – the Murchison Basin. The western limb of the syncline dips steeply down to the axis of the syncline along the Buller River at c. 65 – c. 75 degrees and the eastern limb dips down towards the river at up to 85 degrees. Up to a maximum of 12 km (7.5 mi) of sediment was deposited from Late Eocene to about Middle Miocene in the basin with the top 3 km lost to erosion. The formation of the Longford Syncline was driven by compression and reactivation of basement faults caused by the convergence of the Australia and Pacific plates, particularly in the last 7 million years. The deep burial of organic-rich sediments resulted in the generation of hydrocarbons with several oil and gas seeps in the Murchison Basin but exploration drilling found no oil and gas reservoirs.

== See also ==
- Geology of the Tasman District
- Geology of the West Coast Region
