= Ellis River (New Zealand) =

River in the Tasman District, New Zealand

- Route of the Ellis River
- Mouth of the Ellis River Ellis River (New Zealand) (South Island)

Location
- Country: New Zealand

Physical characteristics
- Source: Wharepapa / Arthur Range
  - coordinates: 41.2321°S 172.6958°E
- Mouth
  - location: Baton River
  - coordinates: 41°18′13″S 172°42′13″E
- Length: 6 kilometres (3.7 mi)

Basin features
- Progression: Ellis River → Baton River → Motueka River → Tasman Bay → Tasman Sea
- Tributaries
  - left: Hicky Creek
  - right: Bruce Creek, Murray Stream

The Ellis River is a river of the northwestern South Island of New Zealand. It arises near Mount Arthur in the Wharepapa / Arthur Range and flows south-east within Kahurangi National Park. It is a tributary of the Baton River.

== See also ==
- List of rivers of New Zealand
