= Ellis Basin cave system =

Cave in New Zealand

- Location within New Zealand
- Location: Wharepapa / Arthur Range
- Coordinates: 41.232°S 172.685°E
- Depth: 1,026 metres (3,366 ft)
- Length: 33.4 kilometres (20.8 mi)
- Discovery: 1960s
- Geology: Limestone

The Ellis Basin cave system is a group of interconnecting limestone caves located in the Mount Arthur region of the northwest South Island of New Zealand.

The Ellis Basin cave system was first explored by cavers in the 1960s. In April 2010, the cave system was found to be deeper than the nearby Nettlebed Cave, making it the deepest known cave in the Southern hemisphere. It has been explored to a depth of 1,024 m (3,360 ft), and its 33.4 km (20.8 mi) of cave passages make it New Zealand's second longest.

== See also ==
- List of caves in New Zealand
