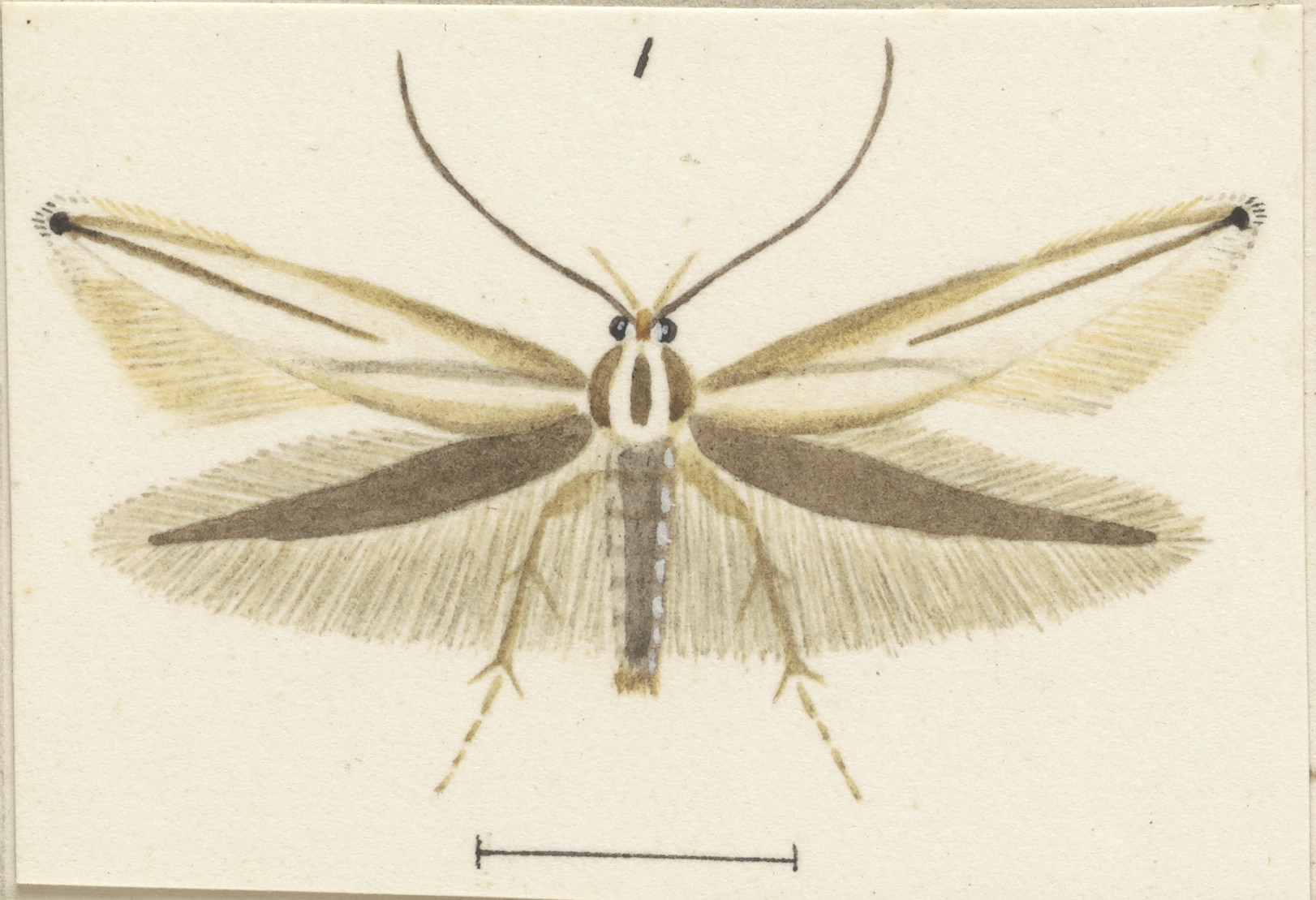
- Illustration by George Hudson

Scientific classification
- Kingdom: Animalia
- Phylum: Arthropoda
- Class: Insecta
- Order: Lepidoptera
- Family: Elachistidae
- Genus: Elachista
- Species: E. sagittifera

Binomial name
- Elachista sagittifera Philpott, 1927

= Elachista sagittifera =

Species of moth endemic to New Zealand

Elachista sagittifera is a species of moth in the family Elachistidae. It was described by Alfred Philpott in 1927. It is endemic to New Zealand and is known from Arthur's Pass. It is similar in appearance to Elachista thallophora. Adults are on the wing in February.

== Taxonomy ==
This species was first described by Alfred Phipott in 1927 using specimens collected by himself and Stewart Lindsay at Arthur's Pass in February. The holotype specimen is held in the Canterbury Museum.

== Description ==
Philpott originally described this species as follows:

♂. 11.5 mm. Head ochreous-whitewith medium brown stripe. Palpi white. Antennae greyish-fuscous. Thorax white, tegulae and medium stripe fuscous. Abdomen white mixed with fuscous. Legs ochreous-white mixed with fuscous. Forewings, costa almost straight, apex acute, termen extremely oblique; white; base of costa to 1/6 narrowly fuscous; a whitish-ochreous stripe along costa, broadest on basal 1/2 ; an ochreous stripe along fold to 2/5 ; an ochreous-fuscous stripe above fold, commencing about 1/3 and running to apex, where it becomes slightly dilated and blackish; a fuscous stripe along dorsum to tornus, thence continuing, but much paler, half way to apex; fringes pale ochreous-fuscous with black basal line round apex. Hindwings dark fuscous; fringes pale ochreous-fuscous.

This species is similar in appearance to Elachista thallophora but differs in how the stripes are arranged on the forewings.

== Distribution ==
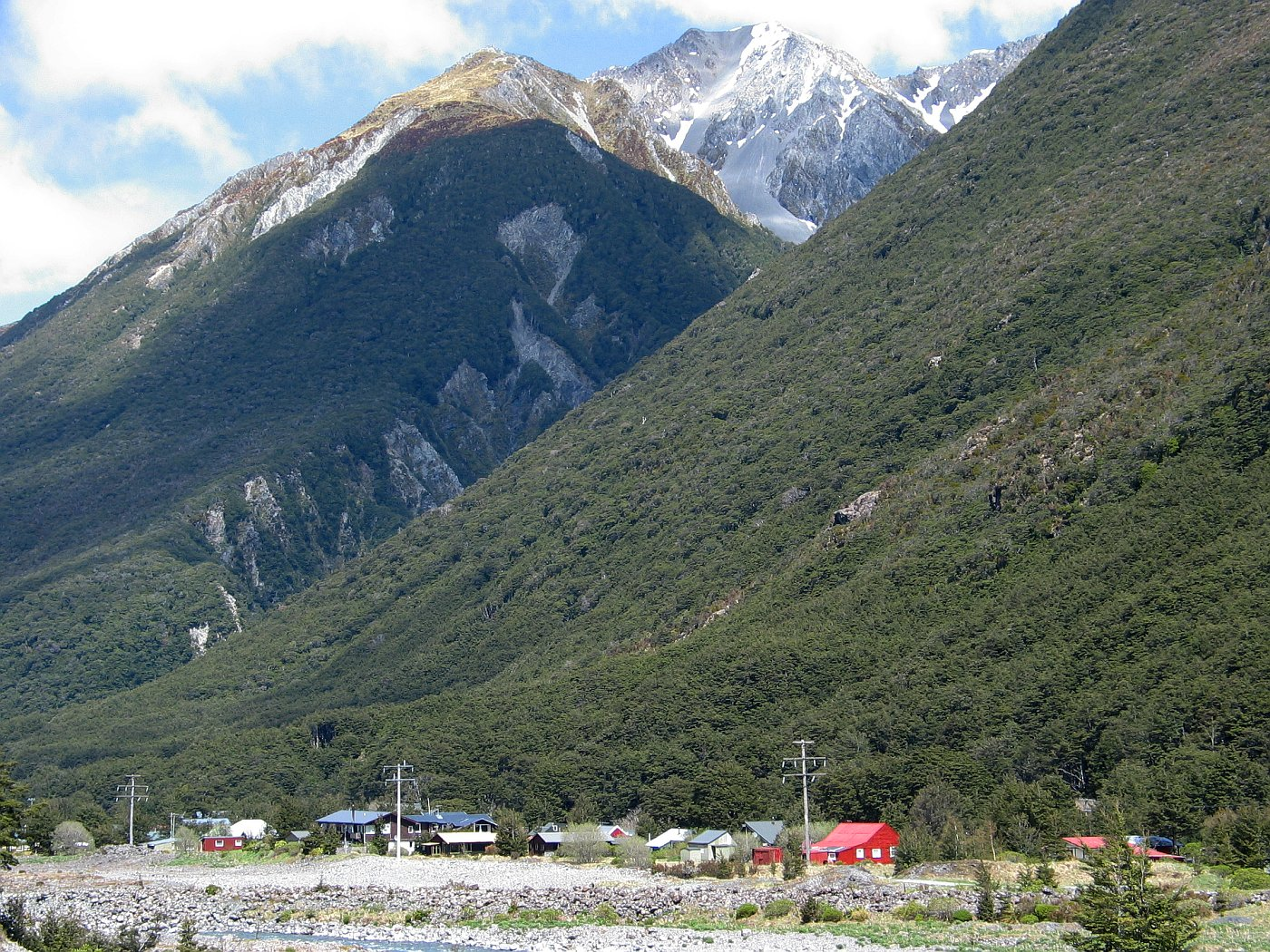
Arthur's Pass, type locality for E. sagittifera

This species is endemic to New Zealand. It is known from Arthur's Pass.

== Behaviour ==
Adults are on the wing in February.
