= Waingaro River =

Waingaro River is the name of two rivers in New Zealand.

- Waingaro River (Tasman)
- Waingaro River (Waikato)
