= Little Devil River =

River in Kahurangi National Park, New Zealand

- Route of the Little Devil River
- Mouth of the Little Devil River Little Devil River (South Island)

Location
- Country: New Zealand

Physical characteristics
- Source
  - location: Devil Range
  - coordinates: 40°58′50″S 172°39′30″E
- Mouth
  - location: Devil River
  - coordinates: 40°58′22″S 172°42′50″E

Basin features
- Progression: Little Devil River → Devil River → Waingaro River → Tākaka River → Golden Bay / Mohua → Tasman Sea

The Little Devil River is a river of the Tasman Region of New Zealand's South Island. It flows southeast to reach the Devil River 15 kilometres southwest of Tākaka.

== See also ==
- List of rivers of New Zealand
