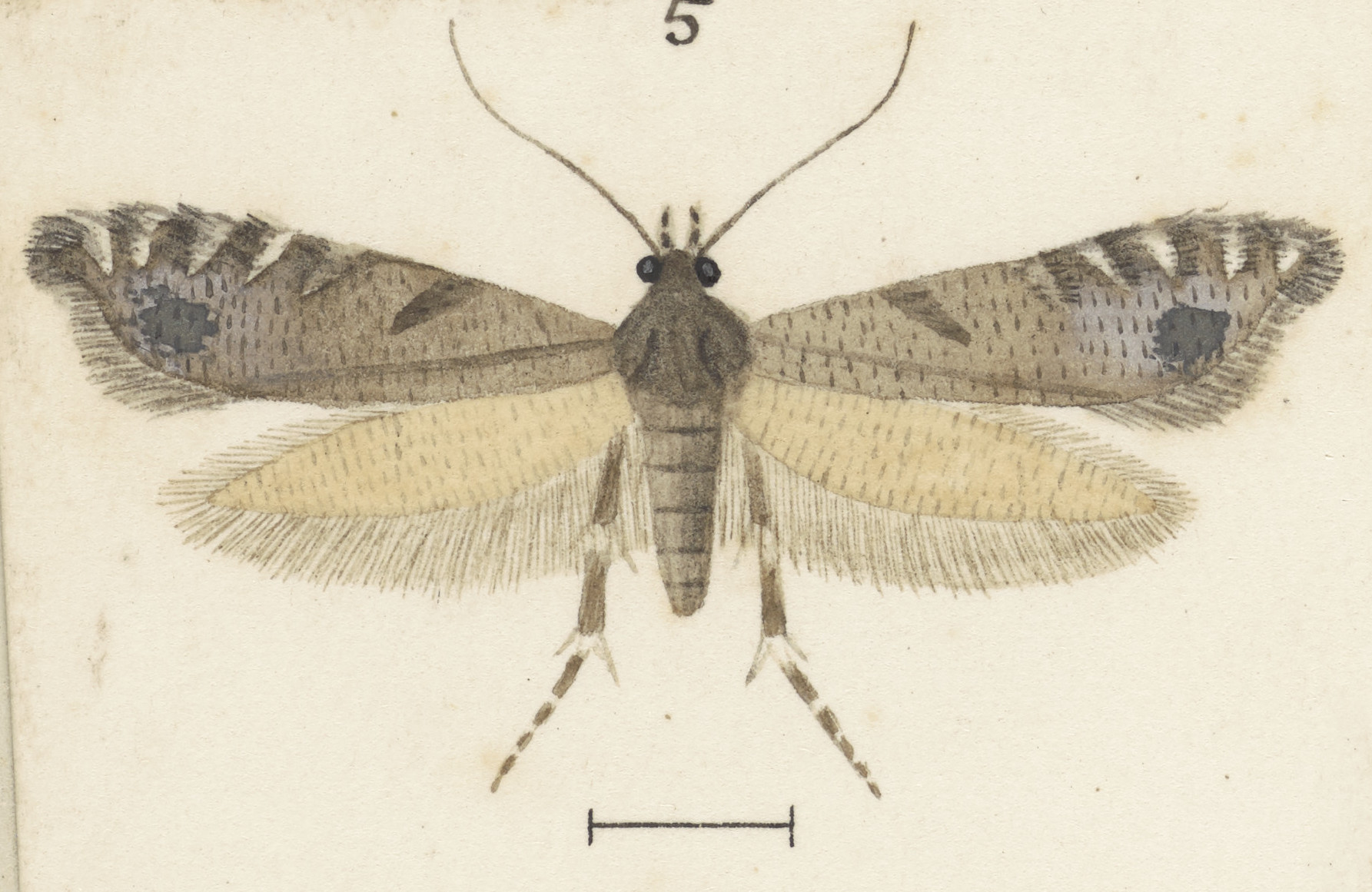
- Illustration of female

Scientific classification
- Kingdom: Animalia
- Phylum: Arthropoda
- Clade: Pancrustacea
- Class: Insecta
- Order: Lepidoptera
- Family: Glyphipterigidae
- Genus: Glyphipterix
- Species: G. acrothecta

Binomial name
- Glyphipterix acrothecta Meyrick, 1880

Synonyms
- Glyphipteryx acrothecta Meyrick, 1880

= Glyphipterix acrothecta =

Species of moth

Glyphipterix acrothecta is a species of sedge moth in the genus Glyphipterix. It was described by Edward Meyrick in 1880. It is found in New Zealand.

== Taxonomy ==
This species was first described by Edward Meyrick in 1880 and named Glyphipteryx acrothecta. In 1928 George Hudson discussed and illustrated this species under that name in his book The butterflies and moths of New Zealand. In 1988 John S. Dugdale confirmed the placement of this species in the genus Glyphipterix. The female lectotype specimen, collected at the Mount Arthur, is held at the Natural History Museum, London.

== Description ==
Meyrick described this species as follows:

♂. 4 1/2"-5". Head and thorax dark bronzy-grey. Palpi white at base, second joint with two short oblique whorls of black white-tipped scales, terminal joint black with two oblique white rings and white above towards apex. Antennae dark fuscous. Abdomen elongate, blackish-grey with white rings, apex white. Legs dark fuscous, posterior and middle tibiae with white central and apical bands, tarsi with obsolete whitish rings at apex of joints, posterior tarsi with a clear white ring at apex of basal joint, and two apical joints wholly white. Fore-wings narrow, elongate, not dilated, hind-margin sinuate beneath apex; dull pale grey, suffused with brownish on disc and inner margin; six rather obscure white, anteriorly blackish-margined, oblique costal streaks; first at 1/4, reaching to middle, partially black-margined posteriorly as well; second in middle, not reaching half across wing; third to sixth short, mostly on costal cilia, each silvery-metallic at apex; a black oblique streak from middle of inner margin, leading to an obscure whitish anteriorly black-margined spot below apex of first costal streak; a faint whitish spot on anal angle, preceded by a short curved black streak; two silvery-metallic spots on disc, beneath extremities of second and third costal streaks, sometimes united with them; a rather large conical silver-metallic black-margined spot on hind-margin below middle; a small silvery-metallic black-margined spot on hind-margin below apex; cilia whitish, with a sharp black apical hook, fuscous-grey towards anal angle, basal half separated by a black line and fuscous-grey, except where a whitish black-margined indentation meets the small silvery-metallic sub-apical spot. Hind-wings and cilia dark fuscous-grey.

== Distribution ==
This species is endemic to New Zealand. As well as its type locality this species has also been observed the Canterbury Region.

== Habitat ==
G. acrothecta inhabits open grassy hill sides.

== Behaviour ==
Adults are on the wing in January.
