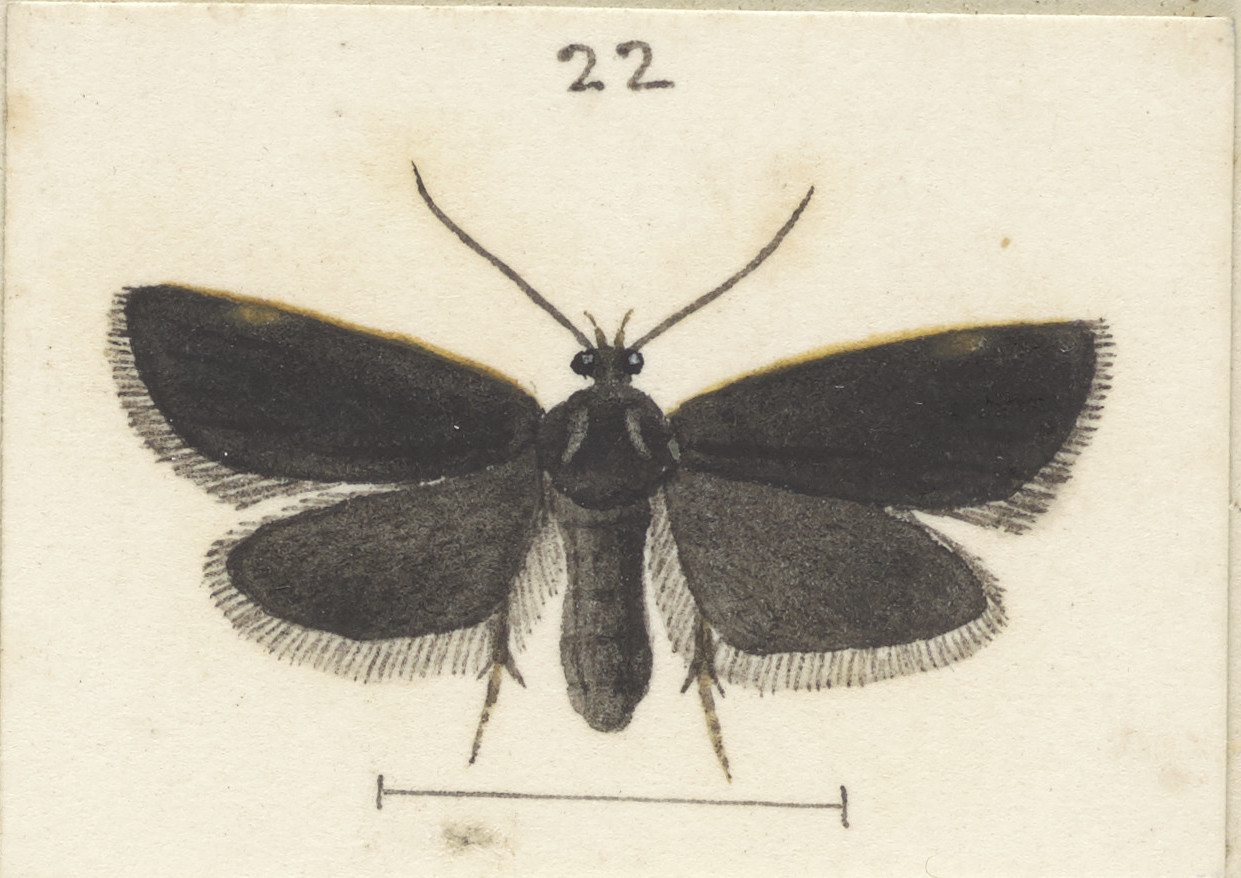
- Illustration by George Hudson

Scientific classification
- Kingdom: Animalia
- Phylum: Arthropoda
- Clade: Pancrustacea
- Class: Insecta
- Order: Lepidoptera
- Family: Depressariidae
- Genus: Cryptolechia
- Species: C. semnodes

Binomial name
- Cryptolechia semnodes Meyrick, 1911

= Cryptolechia semnodes =

Species of moth

Cryptolechia semnodes is a moth in the family Depressariidae. It is endemic to New Zealand. It was first described by Edward Meyrick in 1911 using a specimen collected at Mount Arthur tableland in February. It is dark in appearance and likely belongs to another genus. This species flies in bright sunshine and is likely a very local species. It is likely that this species probably belongs to another genus and as such this species is also known as Cryptolechia (s.l.) semnodes.

== Taxonomy ==
This species was described by Edward Meyrick in 1911 using a specimen collected by George Hudson at Mount Arthur Tableland in February at an altitude of 4200 ft. Hudson discussed and illustrated this species in his 1928 book The butterflies and moths of New Zealand. It is likely that this species probably belongs to another genus and as such this species is also known as Cryptolechia (s.l.) semnodes. The holotype is held at the Natural History Museum, London.

== Description ==
Meyrick described this species as follows:

♂. 16 mm. Head, antennae, and thorax dark fuscous. Palpi dark fuscous, second joint sprinkled with pale ochreous. Abdomen dark purplish-fuscous, beneath with last four segments suffused with brassy-yellow. Fore-wings elongate, somewhat dilated posteriorly, costa gently arched, apex obtuse, termen slightly rounded, somewhat oblique; 7 to termen; dark fuscous, with slight bronzy-purplish tinge; second discal stigma very obscurely darker; two or three whitish-fuscous scales towards costa about middle and 3/4 : cilia dark fuscous. Hindwings blackish; cilia fuscous, basal third blackish.

In 1928 Alfred Philpott examined the male genitalia of specimens of this species and notes that this species differed significantly from other species in this genus. He noted that unlike other New Zealand endemic species in this genus C. semnodes had the gnathos present and the harpes were simple on the male genitalia.

== Distribution ==
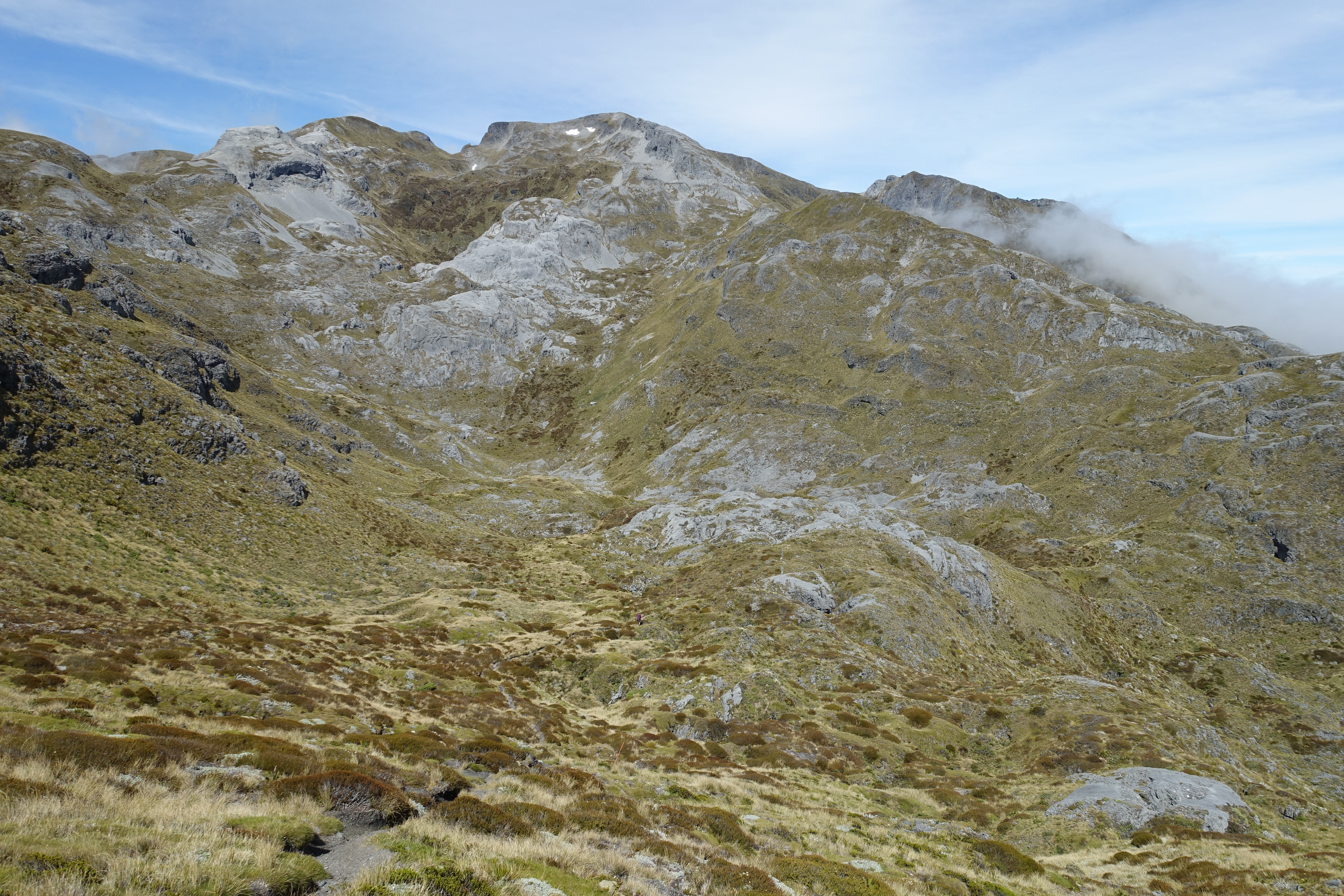
Mount Arthur, habitat of Cryptolechia semnodes

This species is endemic to New Zealand and has been collected at Mount Arthur tableland.

== Behaviour ==
This species flies in the brightest sunshine and was regarded by Hudson as a very local insect.
