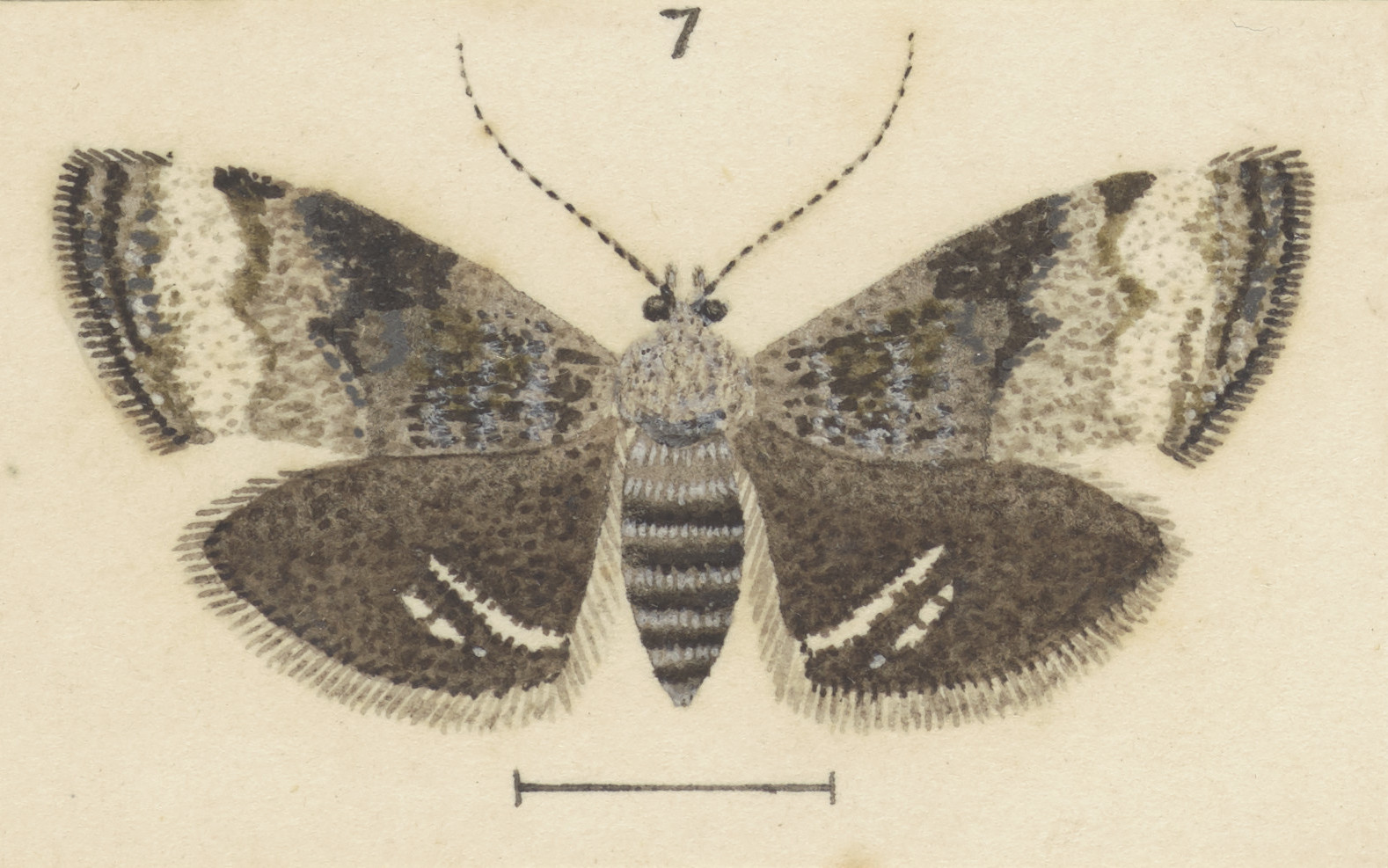
- Illustration of female
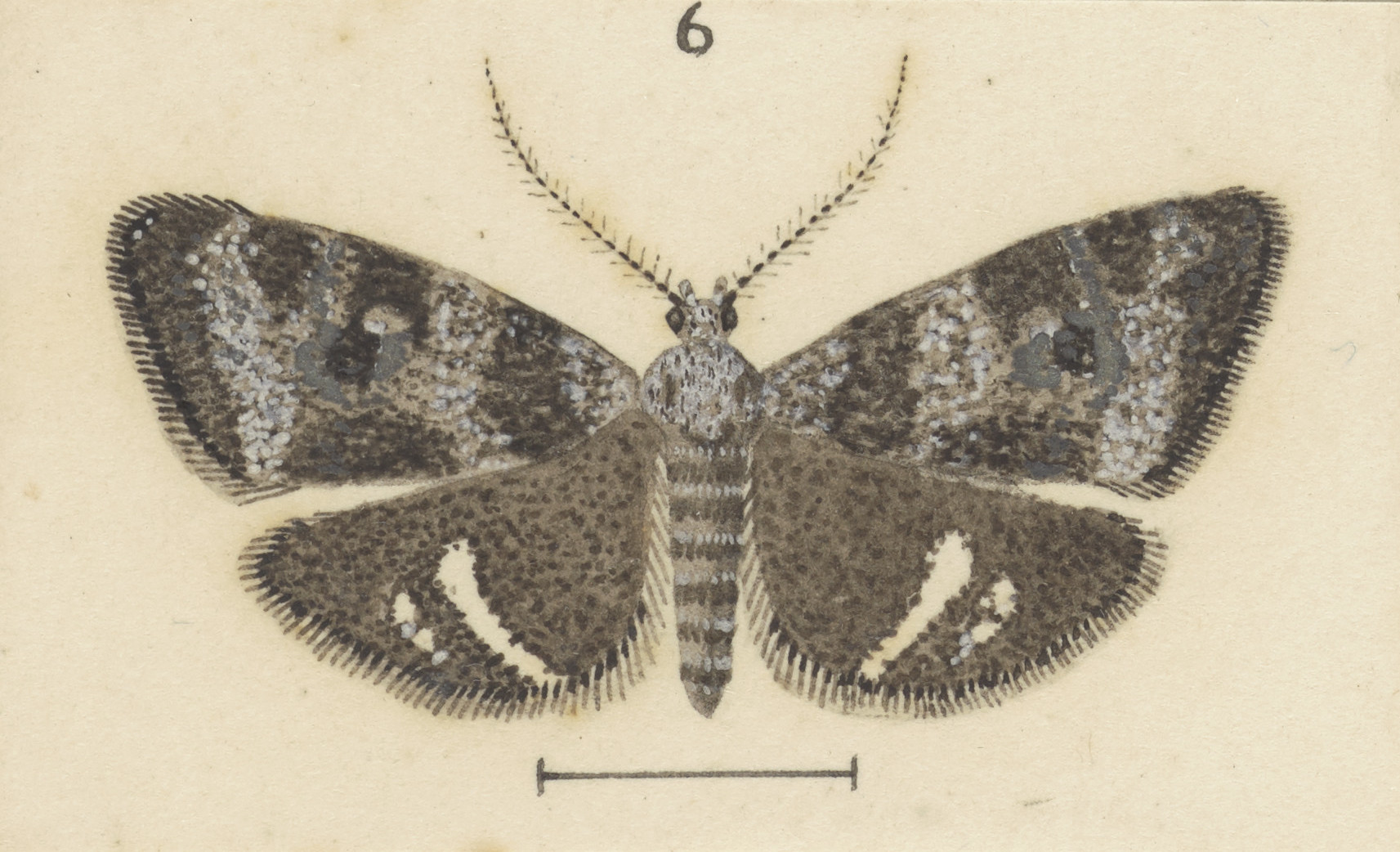
- Illustration of male

Scientific classification
- Kingdom: Animalia
- Phylum: Arthropoda
- Class: Insecta
- Order: Lepidoptera
- Family: Choreutidae
- Genus: Asterivora
- Species: A. albifasciata

Binomial name
- Asterivora albifasciata (Philpott, 1924)

Synonyms
- Simaethis albifasciata Philpott, 1924

= Asterivora albifasciata =

Species of moth

Asterivora albifasciata is a species of moth in the family Choreutidae. It is endemic to New Zealand and has been observed on both the North and South Islands. The adults of this species are on the wing in December and January. Larvae of this species have been raised on Celmisia brevifolia.

== Taxonomy ==
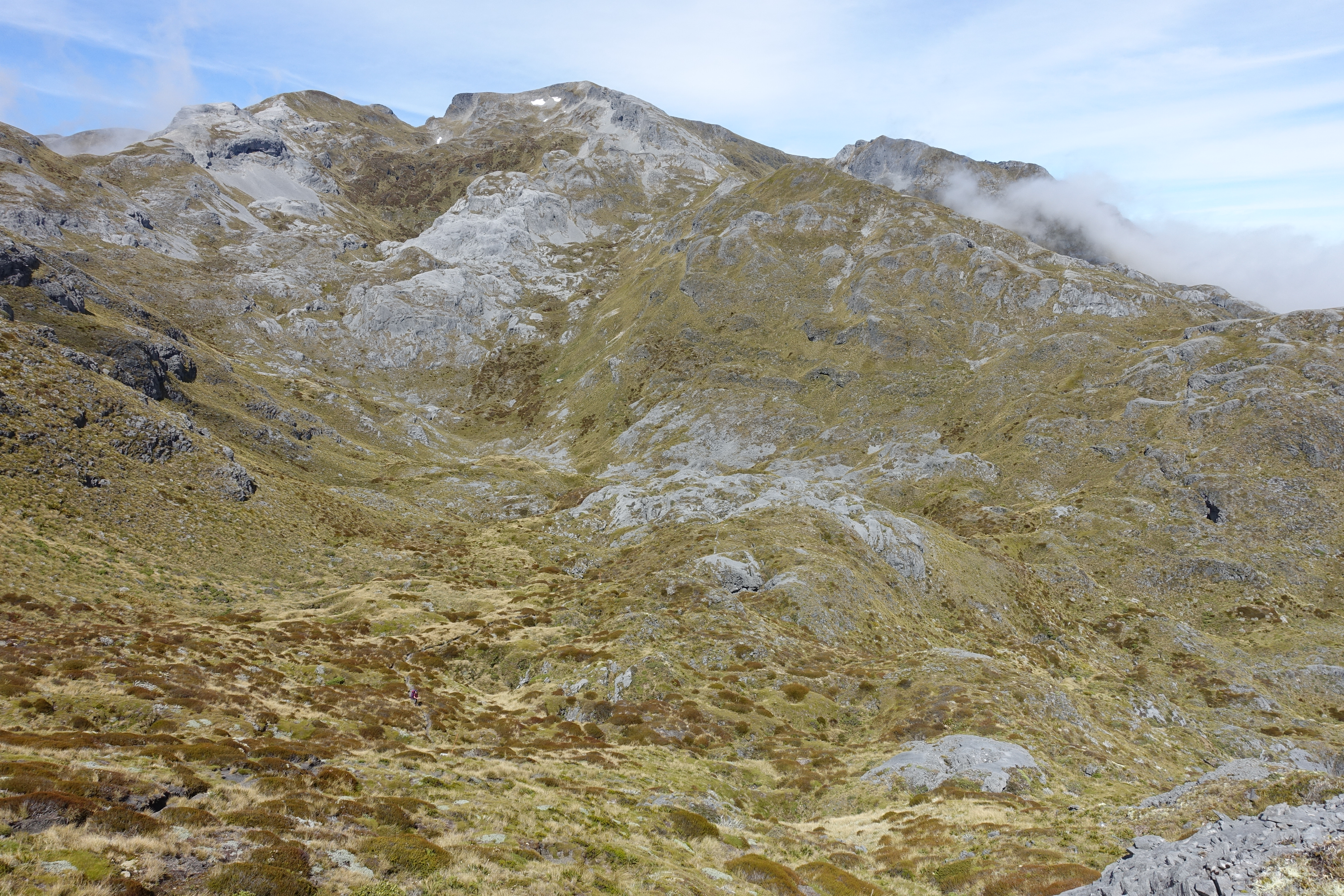
Mount Arthur, type locality of A. albifasciata.

This species was described by Alfred Philpott in 1924, and named Simaethis albifasciata. In 1927 Alfred Philpott studied the male genitalia of this species. George Hudson discussed and illustrated this species in his 1928 publication The butterflies and moths of New Zealand. In 1979 J. S. Dugdale placed this species within the genus Asterivora. In 1988 Dugdale confirmed this placement. The male holotype specimen, collected at Mount Arthur, is held at the New Zealand Arthropod Collection.

== Description ==
Alfred Philpott described this species explaining that the wingspan is 11–12 mm. The head and thorax are bronzy-brown densely sprinkled with white. The antennae are bronzy-brown annulated with white. The abdomen is bronzy-brown, although the segmental divisions are white. The legs are pale brown mixed with white. On the forewings, the costa slightly is arched, the apex rounded, the termen straight. They are oblique and bronzy-brown mixed with blackish. There is a patch of white scales at the base above the middle, a broad irregular band of white scales at about half and a small white spot on the costa beyond the middle giving rise to a very irregular line composed of violet and blue metallic scales mixed with white. This line is strongly excurved at the middle and is there preceded by a similar but short line in the disc. There is also a broad white subterminal band of white scales, followed on the median portion by a line of metallic scales. A terminal line of white scales is more or less interrupted at the middle. The hindwings are pale bronzy-brown. Here, there is a straight white fascia running from the termen before tornus directed towards two-thirds of the costa, and reaching half-way across the wing.

== Distribution ==
This species is endemic to New Zealand. Other than its type locality of Mount Arthur, this species has been collected in locations such as Wellington, Mount Ruapehu, and Tongariro.

== Host species ==
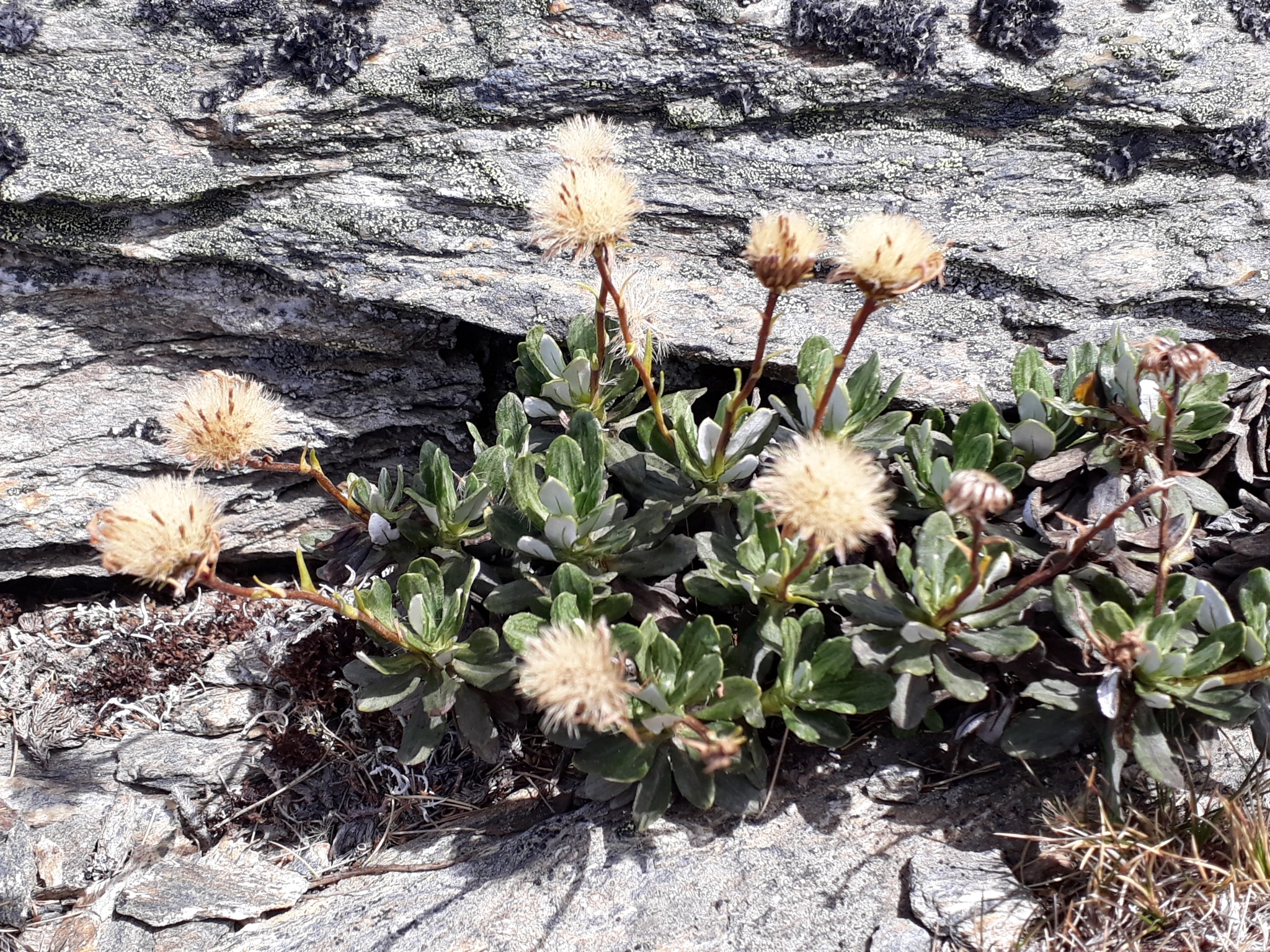
Larval host Celmisia brevifolia.

Larvae of this species have been raised on Celmisia brevifolia.

== Behaviour ==
Adults of this species are on the wing in December and January.
