= Baton River =

River in the Tasman District, New Zealand

- Route of the Baton River
- Mouth of the Baton River Baton River (South Island)

Location
- Country: New Zealand

Physical characteristics
- Source
  - location: Wharepapa / Arthur Range
  - coordinates: 41°15′29″S 172°34′39″E
- Mouth
  - location: Motueka River
  - coordinates: 41°16′39″S 172°48′24″E
  - elevation: 85 m (279 ft)
- Length: 25 km (16 mi)

Basin features
- Progression: Baton River → Motueka River → Tasman Bay → Tasman Sea
- Tributaries
  - left: Taylor Creek, Ironstone Creek, Loveridge Creek, Haines Stream, Ellis River, Long Gully Stream, Stony Creek
  - right: White Creek, Skeet River, McCarthy Creek, Clarke River, Naylor Creek

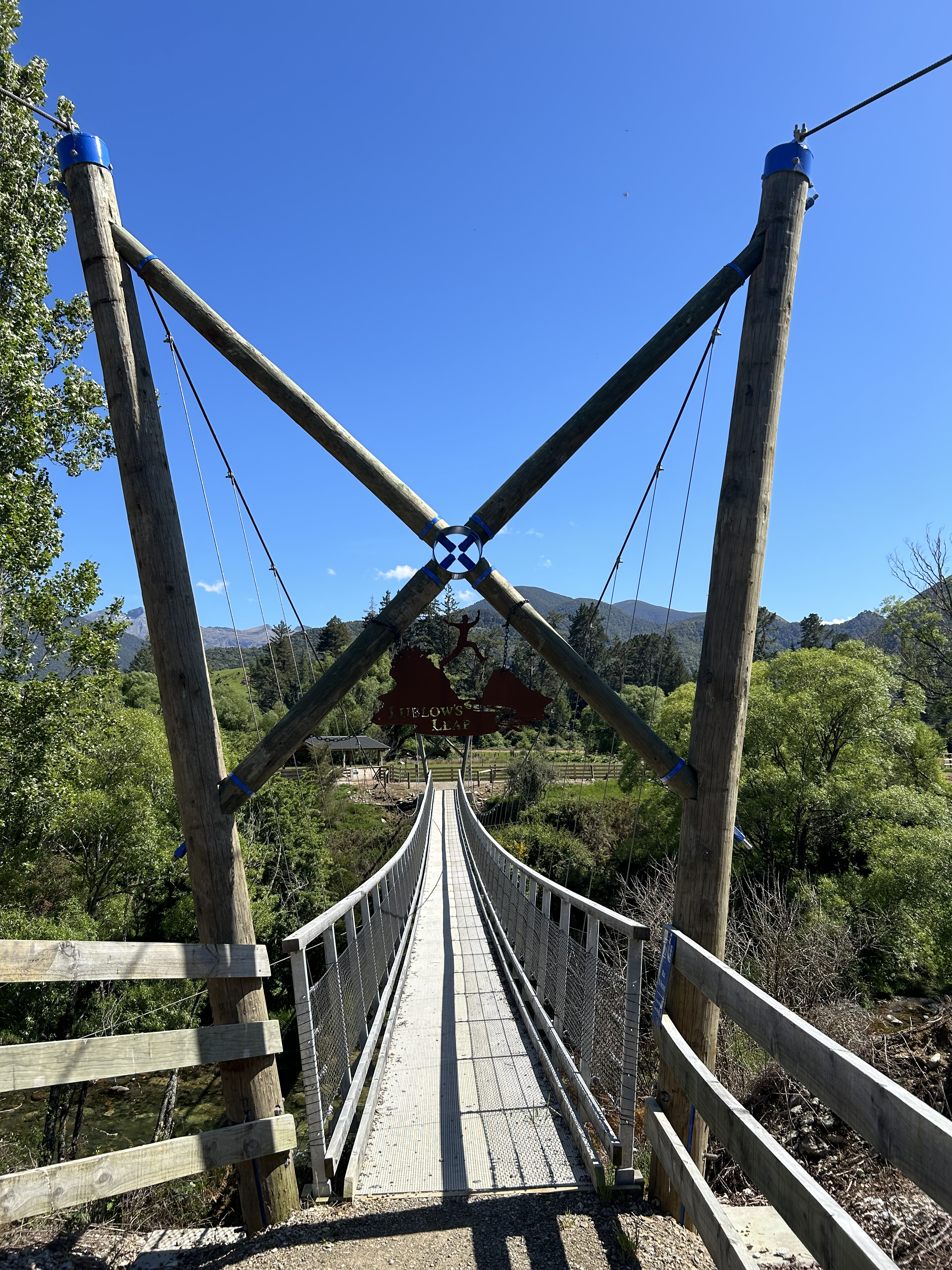
Baton River bridge on Great Taste Nelson trail.

The Baton River is a river in the Tasman District of the South Island of New Zealand. It rises near the Baton Saddle in the Arthur Range and flows ESE then northeast before feeding into the Motueka River 2 kilometres (1.2 mi) south of Woodstock. A tramping track follows the upper part of the river valley, leading to the Karamea-Leslie track and Kahurangi National Park.

== See also ==
- List of rivers of New Zealand
