= Elachista thallophora =

Scientific classification
- Kingdom: Animalia
- Phylum: Arthropoda
- Clade: Pancrustacea
- Class: Insecta
- Order: Lepidoptera
- Family: Elachistidae
- Genus: Elachista
- Species: E. thallophora

Binomial name
- Elachista thallophora Meyrick, 1889

Species of moth endemic to New Zealand

Elachista thallophora is a moth in the family Elachistidae. It was first described by Edward Meyrick in 1889. It is endemic to New Zealand and is found in the North and South Islands but is extremely local. Where found this species can be abundant. The preferred habitat of E. thallophora is grassy areas from sea level up to the subalpine and alpine zones. It is also known to inhabit alpine bogs. Although the larval host is unknown it is likely to be a tussock grass species. The larvae are also likely to be stem or leaf miners. Adults are on the wing from October until April.

== Taxonomy ==
This species was first described by Edward Meyrick in 1889 using specimens collected in sand hills near Christchurch and at Mount Arthur at 4,000 feet (1,200 m) in January and March. George Hudson discussed and illustrated this species in his 1928 book The butterflies and moths of New Zealand. The male lectotype, collected in the sandhills near Kaiapoi, is held at the Natural History Museum, London.

== Description ==
Live moth amongst grass.

Illustration by Hudson.

Meyrick's original description of the adults is as follows:

♂♀. 8-15 mm. Head ochreous-whitish, with a central longitudinal ochreous-brown stripe. Palpi white. Antennae whitish-fuscous. Thorax brown, with an ochreous-white stripe on each side of back. Abdomen grey, anal tuft ochreous-whitish. Legs dark fuscous, posterior pair whitish. Fore-wings lanceolate ; pearly white ; an ochreous-brown longitudinal streak from base of costa, and another from base in middle, converging to a point in disc at 4/5, where they terminate ; an ochreous-brown streak along inner margin from base to anal angle ; in male these markings are thicker, darker, and more suffused, and posterior half of costa is also suffused with brown : cilia in male whitish-fuscous, in female ochreous-whitish, beneath anal angle fuscous-tinged. Hindwings grey ; cilia light grey.

Adults of E. thallophora are very narrow winged, with reduced hindwings, and are a pearl white colour with long brown stripes on their forewings. Meyrick pointed out that the size difference between the sexes is noteworthy with the female sometimes being almost twice as large as the male. This species was regarded by Meyrick as being distinct.

== Distribution ==
E. thallophora is endemic to New Zealand. It is found in both the North and South Islands but is regarded as being extremely local. Meyrick stated that this species is abundant where it is found.

== Habitat and hosts ==
This species is found in grassy places from sea level up to the subalpine and alpine zones (1,600 metres (5,200 ft)). It has also be observed in alpine bog habitat. As at 2019 the larval host of this species is unknown however it is likely to be a tussock grass species based on the preferred habitat of this moth. Larvae are likely to be leaf or stem miners.

== Behaviour ==
Adults are on the wing from October until April.
