= Clarke River (Tasman) =

River in the Tasman District, New Zealand

- Route of the Clarke River
- Mouth of the Clarke River Clarke River (Tasman) (South Island)

Location
- Country: New Zealand

Physical characteristics
- Source
  - location: Mount Gomorrah
  - coordinates: 41°22′36″S 172°35′19″E
  - elevation: 1,592 metres (5,223 ft)
- Mouth
  - location: Baton River
  - coordinates: 41°19′19″S 172°42′56″E
  - elevation: 170 m (560 ft)
- Length: 12 km (7.5 mi)

Basin features
- Progression: Clarke River → Baton River → Motueka River → Tasman Bay → Tasman Sea
- Tributaries
  - left: Fowler Creek
  - right: Bacon Creek

The Tasman Region's Clarke River is one of three rivers by that name in the South Island of New Zealand. It rises in the Kahurangi National Park from the eastern flanks of Mount Gomorrah (1,592 metres (5,223 ft)) flowing southeast then northeast before joining the Baton River 10 kilometres (6 mi) northwest of the township of Tapawera.
