= Skeet River =

River in the Tasman District, New Zealand

- Route of the Skeet River
- Mouth of the Skeet River Skeet River (South Island)

Location
- Country: New Zealand

Physical characteristics
- Source
  - location: Wharepapa / Arthur Range
  - coordinates: 41°21′05″S 172°35′12″E
- Mouth
  - location: Baton River
  - coordinates: 41°18′32″S 172°42′09″E
- Length: 12 km (7.5 mi)

Basin features
- Progression: Skeet River → Baton River → Motueka River → Tasman Bay → Tasman Sea
- Tributaries
  - left: Moran Creek

The Skeet River is a river of the Tasman Region of New Zealand's South Island. It flows northeast from the Wharepapa / Arthur Range, reaching the Baton River 15 kilometres northwest of Tapawera.

== See also ==
- List of rivers of New Zealand
