= Lake Sparrow =

Mountain tarn in New Zealand

- Location within New Zealand
- Location: Kahurangi National Park
- Coordinates: 40°58′37″S 172°37′00″E
- River sources: Stanley River
- Basin countries: New Zealand
- Surface area: 4 ha (9.9 acres)
- Surface elevation: 1,400 m (4,600 ft)

Lake Sparrow is a mountain tarn in New Zealand's Anatoki Range. It is located within Kahurangi National Park in the South Island's Tasman Region. It lies at an elevation of some 1,400 metres (4,600 ft), and covers approximately 4 hectares (9.9 acres).

Lake Sparrow feeds a small tributary of the Stanley River close to its headwaters above Lake Stanley.
