= Pearse River =

River in the Tasman District, New Zealand

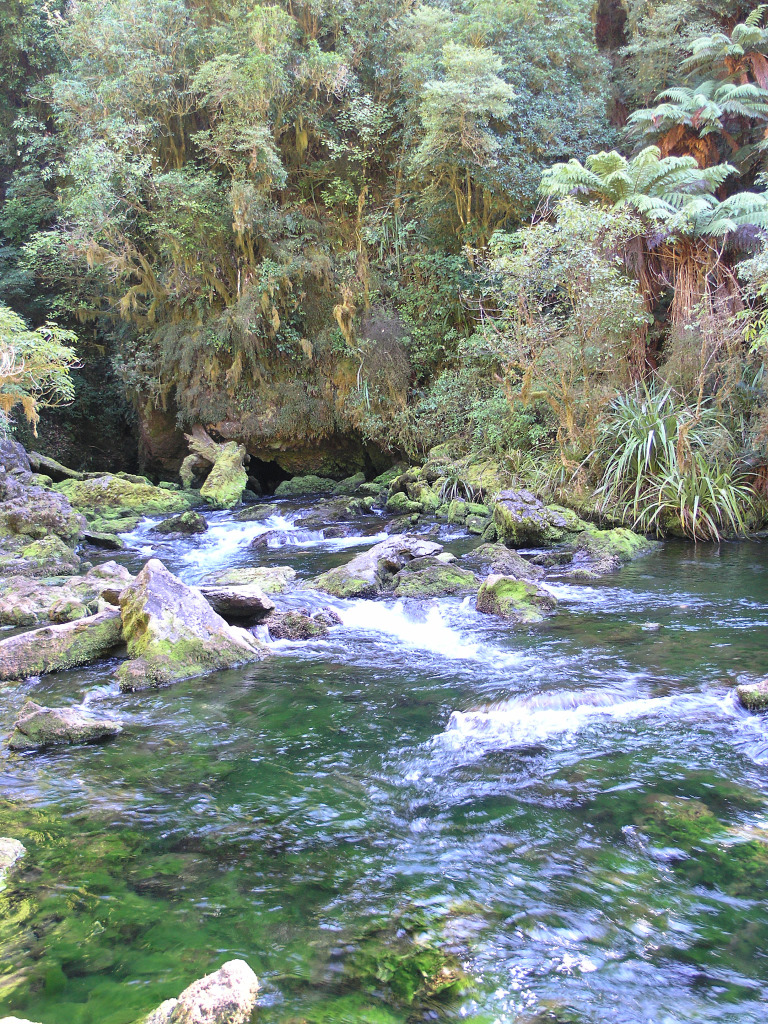
- The Pearse resurgence, where water exits from Nettlebed Cave
- Route of the Pearse River
- Mouth of the Pearse River Pearse River (South Island)

Location
- Country: New Zealand

Physical characteristics
- Source
  - location: Confluence of Eyles Creek and Whisky Creek
  - coordinates: 41°12′40″S 172°44′26″E
- Mouth
  - location: Motueka River
  - coordinates: 41°13′54″S 172°48′48″E
- Length: 13 kilometres (8.1 mi)

Basin features
- Progression: Pearse River → Motueka River → Tasman Bay → Tasman Sea
- Tributaries
  - left: Sugar Loaf Creek
  - right: Field Creek, Goat Creek, Granity Creek

The Pearse River is a river of the Tasman Region of New Zealand's South Island. It flows east from sources in the Wharepapa / Arthur Range, reaching the Motueka River 20 kilometres southwest of Motueka.

The source is a resurgence near the Nettlebed Cave. The resurgence has been dived to a depth of 245 metres and a diver had died in one attempt. At least three undescribed species have been found by divers in the resurgence. The resurgence was the subject of the 2025 Jennifer Peedom documentary Deeper, which followed a team of divers led by Dr Richard Harris.

== See also ==
- List of rivers of New Zealand
