= Devil River =

River in Kahurangi National Park, New Zealand

- Route of the Little Devil River
- Mouth of the Little Devil River Devil River (South Island)

Location
- Country: New Zealand

Physical characteristics
- Source
  - location: Devil River Peak
  - coordinates: 40°58′27″S 172°38′32″E
- Mouth
  - location: Waingaro River
  - coordinates: 40°58′48″S 172°44′18″E
- Length: 22 km (14 mi)

Basin features
- Progression: Devil River → Waingaro River → Tākaka River → Golden Bay / Mohua → Tasman Sea
- Tributaries
  - right: Little Devil River

The Devil River is a river of New Zealand's Tasman Region. It starts between the Devil Range and the Anatoki Range and flows generally east through the Kahurangi National Park, reaching the Waingaro River.

== See also ==
- List of rivers of New Zealand
