= Little Waingaro River =

River in Tasman District, New Zealand

- Route of the Little Waingaro River
- Mouth of the Little Waingaro River Little Waingaro River (South Island)

Location
- Country: New Zealand

Physical characteristics
- Source
  - coordinates: 40°55′33″S 172°43′00″E
- Mouth
  - location: Waingaro River
  - coordinates: 40°54′51″S 172°46′14″E

Basin features
- Progression: Little Waingaro River → Waingaro River → Tākaka River → Golden Bay / Mohua → Tasman Sea

The Little Waingaro River is a river of the Tasman Region of New Zealand. It is a tributary of the Waingaro River, which it meets 10 kilometres south of Tākaka.

== See also ==
- List of rivers of New Zealand
