= Stanley River (Tasman) =

River in Kahurangi National Park, New Zealand

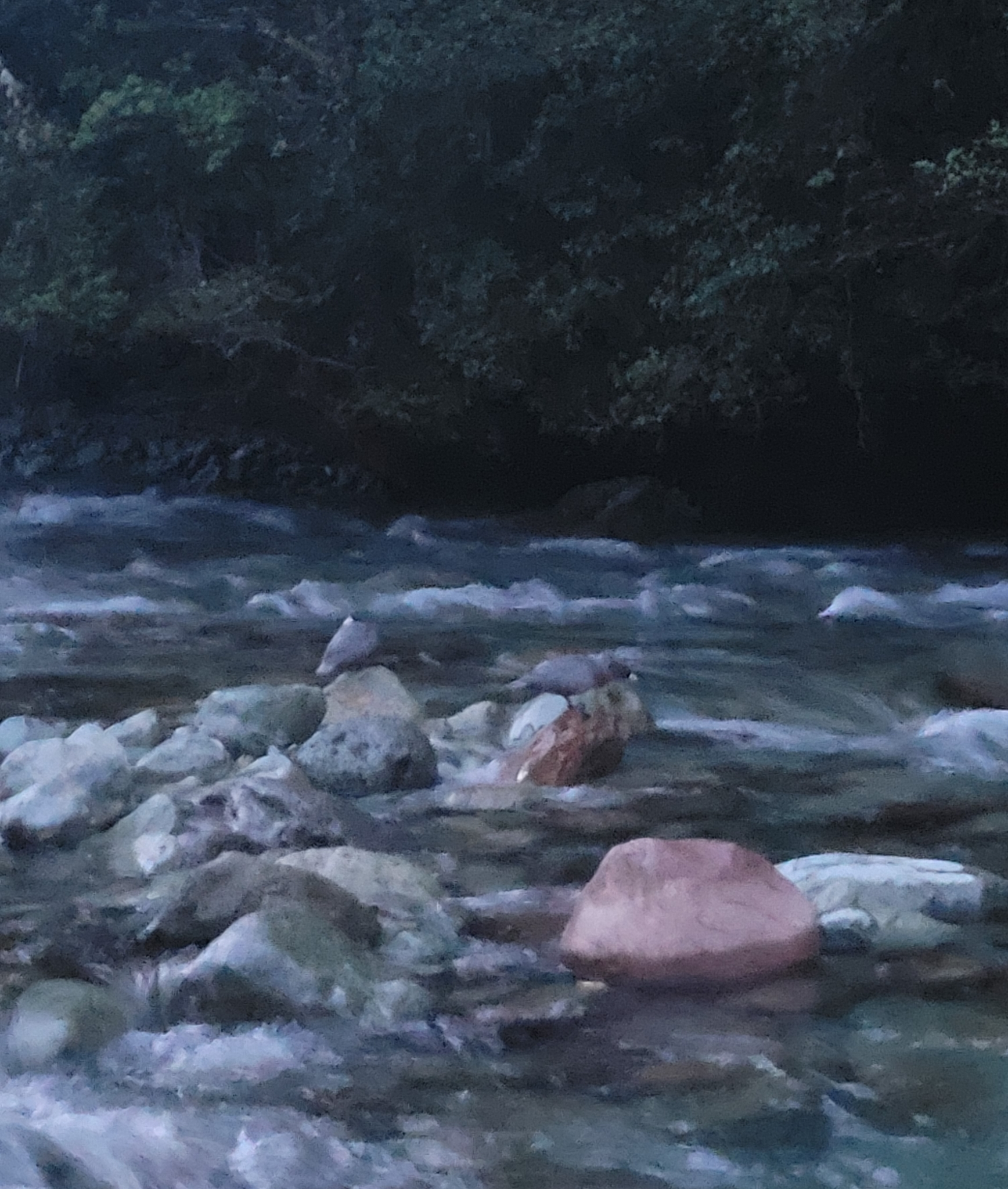
- Blue ducks on the Stanley River just above the confluence with the Waingaro River
- Route of the Stanley River
- Mouth of the Stanley River Stanley River (Tasman) (South Island)

Location
- Country: New Zealand

Physical characteristics
- Source: Douglas Range (north branch)
  - coordinates: 40.9776°S 172.5664°E
- 2nd source: Douglas Range (south branch)
  - coordinates: 40.9873°S 172.5690°E
- Mouth
  - location: Waingaro River
  - coordinates: 41°02′41″S 172°40′39″E
  - elevation: 438 m (1,437 ft)
- Length: 12 km (7.5 mi)

Basin features
- Progression: Stanley River → Waingaro River → Tākaka River → Golden Bay / Mohua → Tasman Sea

The Stanley River is a river of the Tasman Region of New Zealand's South Island. It flows southeast from its sources in the Douglas and Anatoki Ranges, reaching the Waingaro River 12 kilometres west of Upper Tākaka.

The 2.19 km (1.36 mi) long Lake Stanley has the Stanley River as both its inflow and outflow. Above the lake the river has two branches, both called Stanley River. The lake is 770 m (2,530 ft) above sea level, up to 360 m (1,180 ft) wide and 20 m (66 ft) deep. The landslide lake was dammed when a spur of Mt Snowdon collapsed down a slope about 780 m (2,560 ft) high, during the 1929 Murchison Earthquake. The earthquake also formed Lower Lake Lindsay by a similar landslide, in the next valley to the north. In 2016 the Soper Shelter was built near the lake, replacing an earlier backcountry hut in the landslip area. Lake Sparrow is a tarn in the upper catchment of the valley.

The entire length of the Stanley river is within Kahurangi National Park. The valley is used by the Anatoki Forks Hut to Waingaro Forks Hut section of the Historic Kill Devil Pack Track, which crosses the landslip.
