= Waingaro River (Tasman) =

River in Tasman District, New Zealand

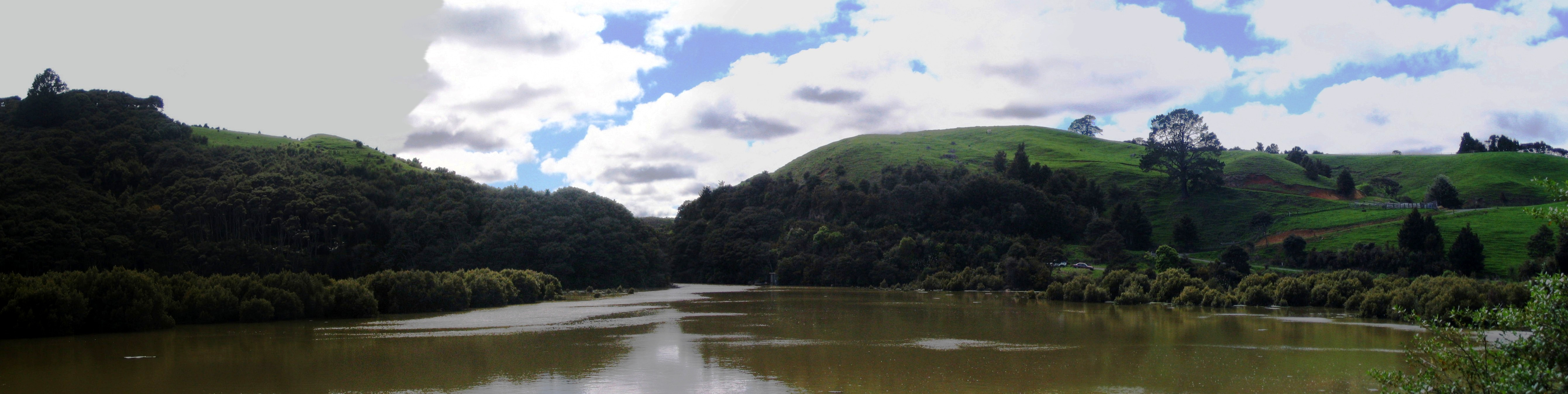
- Route of the Waingaro River
- Mouth of the Waingaro River Waingaro River (Tasman) (South Island)

Location
- Country: New Zealand

Physical characteristics
- Source
  - coordinates: 41°01′23″S 172°33′12″E
- Mouth
  - location: Tākaka River
  - coordinates: 40°52′56″S 172°48′37″E
- Length: 37 km (23 mi)

Basin features
- Progression: Waingaro River → Tākaka River → Golden Bay / Mohua → Tasman Sea
- Tributaries
  - left: Stanley River, Lindsay Creek, Fuller Creek, Devil River, Little Waingaro River
  - right: Ruby Creek, Skeet Creek

The Waingaro River is a river of the Tasman Region of New Zealand's South Island.

== Geography ==
Waingaro River initially flows east down a straight valley formed by the southern flanks of Snowdon Range and the northern flanks of Lockett Range within Kahurangi National Park. The headwater is near the 1,604 metres (5,262 ft) Waingaro Peak within the Lockett Range, accessible via a tramping track from Fenella Hut. Shortly upstream of the confluence with the Stanley River, the only bridge over the Waingaro River is located. This simple suspension bridge gives access for trampers to Waingaro Forks Hut.

Downstream from here, the Waingaro River turns to flow generally north close to the eastern edge of Kahurangi National Park. Once it reaches the Takaka Plains it flows northeast to reach the Tākaka River eight kilometres south of Tākaka, just downstream where State Highway 60 crosses the Tākaka River.

== History ==
There are three rivers on the Takaka Plains and during times of early colonial settlement, drownings were common as no bridges had been built yet. During that time, a common greeting was "how is the river?" This is the title chosen for a book on Tākaka history published in 2017.

The Waingaro River caused flooding on the Takaka Plains in Easter 2016 and in January 2017.

Legal action was taken in 2016 over Waingaro River irrigation consents amid concerns that this may adversely affect the nearby Te Waikoropupū Springs. Whilst the springs themselves are protected, the aquifer feeding the system is not. In 2023 the Environment Court awarded the springs and their aquifer a Water Conservation Order, the highest legal protection.

== See also ==
- List of rivers of New Zealand
