= Wharepapa / Arthur Range =

Mountain range in New Zealand

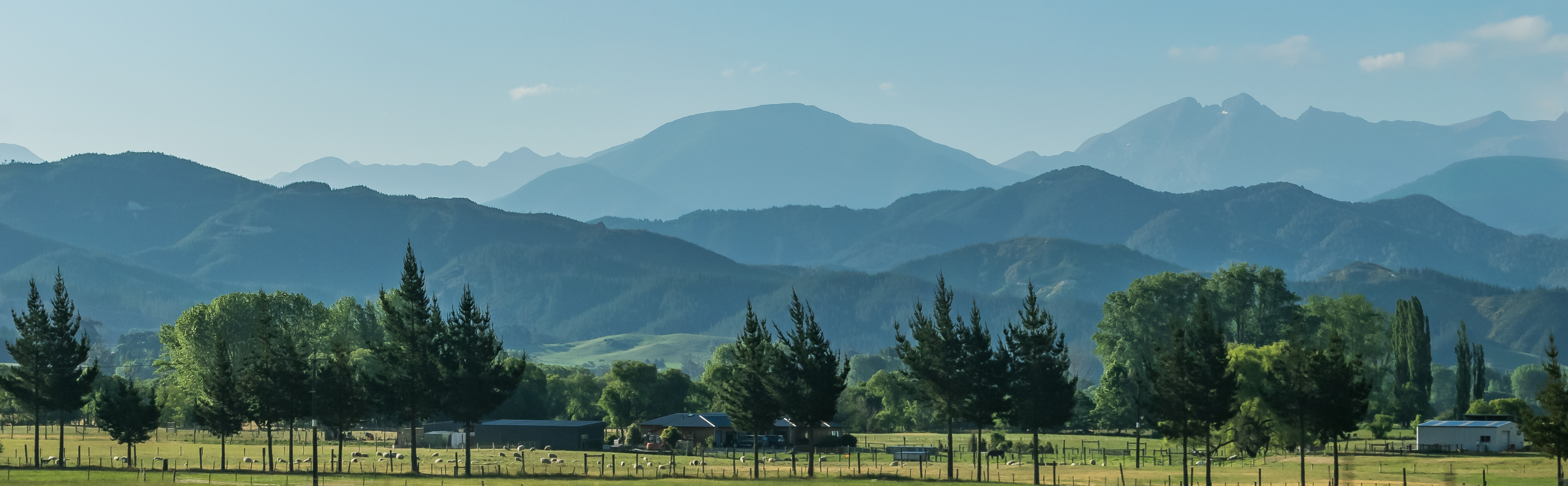
- Wharepapa / Arthur Range as viewed from the Waimea Plains.

Highest point
- Peak: North Twin
- Elevation: 1,809 m (5,935 ft)
- Coordinates: 41°13′05″S 172°40′55″E

Dimensions
- Length: 55 km (34 mi) Northeast-Southwest
- Width: 16 km (9.9 mi) Northwest-Southeast

Naming
- Etymology: After Tuao Wharepapa and Arthur Wakefield.
- Native name: Wharepapa (Māori)

Geography
- Location within New Zealand
- Country: New Zealand
- Region(s): Tasman, West Coast
- Range coordinates: 41°14′02″S 172°39′36″E

Geology
- Formed by: Tectonic uplift / glaciation

The Wharepapa / Arthur Range is a mountain range partially marking the boundary between the Tasman District and West Coast Region of New Zealand's South Island. The range is at the eastern extent of the Tasman Mountains which make up much of the island's northwest, making it easily visible from across the low-lying Waimea Plains further to the east. The range's location and its many uses make it a significant site for local Māori, including the iwi of Te Ātiawa and Ngāti Rārua. This includes the prominent peaks of Mount Arthur and Pukeone / Mount Campbell, which both hold mana in their own right and have become part of the identity of the aforementioned iwi.

The mountains of Wharepapa / Arthur Range have a complex geological history, with most of their rocks dating to the Ordovician and having been transformed several times before being uplifted to their current position. The range is also notable for the vast networks of caves beneath its surface, including several of the deepest caves in New Zealand. These caves have developed as an excellent record of climatic and ecological conditions, with fossils or sub-fossils of dozens of native birds having been found, some of which are either extinct or no longer found in the region.

Despite early economic use, the conservation value of the range continues to be high, and during the late 1980s and early 1990s the area was a core part of efforts to establish a national park in the island's northwest. This culminated in the establishment of Kahurangi National Park in 1996, which continues to protect the Wharepapa / Arthur Range to this day.

== Geography ==
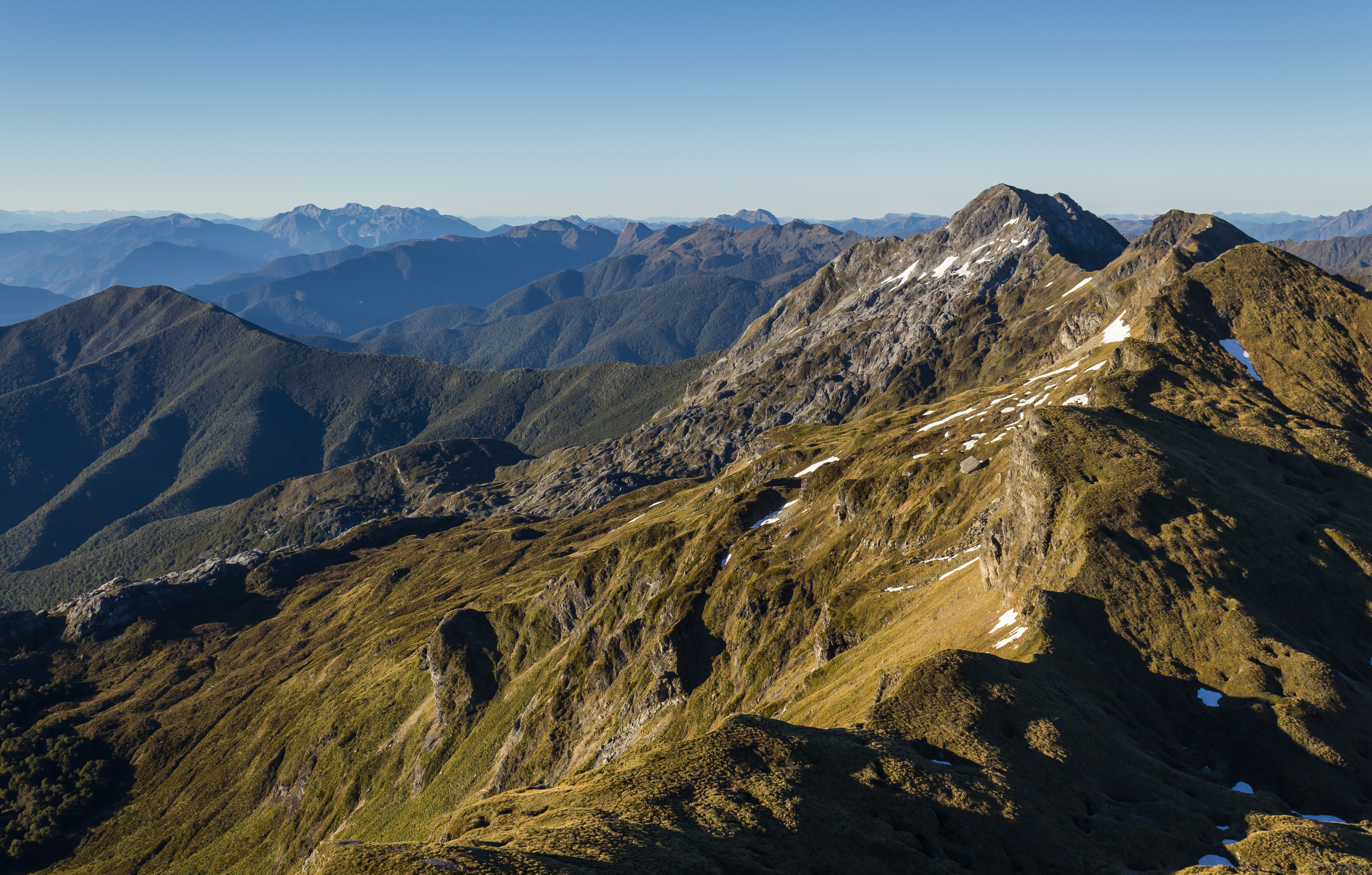
Wharepapa / Arthur Range, as viewed from near the summit of Mount Arthur

As with many of New Zealand's mountain ranges, the Wharepapa / Arthur Range has been formed by millions of years of tectonic uplift. This has taken place through at least two major periods of tectonic activity; one prior to the Cenozoic and another in the late Cenozoic. The history of uplift and other transformation has given the range a wide variety of intermingled rock, with the oldest dating to between the Cambrian and Devonian periods – some of the oldest rocks found anywhere in New Zealand. The majority of the range, however, is made up of crystalline marble from the Ordovician, interbedded with occasional intrusive volcanic material from past activity in the region. Portions of the range and its surrounding area, such as the Tablelands, were formed by the eroded remnants of limestone deposits on a sea-level plain during the Eocene.

The mixed composition of the range has resulted in the formation of extensive cave systems, including the Nettlebed Cave and Ellis Basin cave system, which are the deepest known cave systems in New Zealand at explored depths of 889 metres (2,917 ft) and 1,024 metres (3,360 ft) respectively. The Pearse Resurgence, where the Pearse River emerges from caves underneath the Wharepapa / Arthur Range, is an exit point for many of these systems and has been the site of several cave dives – one of which became the deepest cave dive ever completed in New Zealand in 2016, before being beaten by another dive in the Pearse Resurgence in 2020. Speleothems in the caves of the range have been used to identify the impact which vegetation density has on flowstone growth, which found that there is faster growth during warmer periods with denser vegetation on the mountains.

During the Last Glacial Maximum, the Wharepapa / Arthur Range was home to multiple glaciers, though not to the extent of nearby ranges. Unlike the extensive glacier system of the Cobb valley to the west of the range and the glacially-formed landforms present in the Peel Range, the extent of glaciation in the Wharepapa / Arthur Range was limited to small glaciers around the peaks of Mount Arthur and the Twins. On Mount Arthur, these glaciers formed cirques which polished the marble surfaces of the range. These cirques now feature several sinkholes, as a result of the extensive cave systems within the range.

== History ==
Wharepapa / Arthur Range has had a long history of human interaction, both before and after Pākehā settlement of New Zealand. The range is known to local Māori as Wharepapa, a name it shares with Mount Arthur (Tu Ao Wharepapa in Māori). This is said to have originated with a local rangatira, who named the range and peak after a woman whom he fell in love with. Oral traditions of Ngāti Tama hold Wharepapa as an ancestor, with the mountain itself providing a link to the spirits. Similarly, both Tu Ao Wharepapa and Pukeone within the range are sacred to Ngāti Rārua, as are several of the caves within the range. Due to its visibility across the area, Pukeone was used as a location to light signal fires to convey news or signal important events, such as when Arthur Wakefield accepted the location of Nelson to found a settlement.

During the mid-19th century, the Nelson Provincial Council commissioned Arthur Dudley Dobson to explore the mountains on their behalf. Dobson named the range and its most prominent peak after Captain Arthur Wakefield, who had been heavily involved in the establishment of Nelson on behalf of the New Zealand Company. As the settlement of Nelson expanded, the colonists began exploring for more grazing land and resources to help develop Nelson's economy. Rumours of a vast expanse of tussockland beyond the Arthur Range led to the discovery of the Tablelands by Thomas Salisbury, a settler in search of pastureland. After early use for raising livestock by Salisbury and his brothers, gold was discovered on the Tablelands of the range. This spurred a small gold rush, although conditions in the tablelands and their relative remoteness for the quantity of gold hindered major development. Sporadic exploration for further mineral deposits across the range continued late into the 20th century, however none developed into industrial operations. A proposal by an Australian mining company to construct a road into the region and open it for mining in 1981 was met with swift opposition, becoming a catalyst for the designation of the region as a national park 15 years later.

In contrast to the relative lack of success from mineral prospectors, the mountain range proved far more valuable to tourism operators. As early as the 1880s, groups of tourists were venturing into the region, using the few huts in the area as bases from which to explore on day trips. As tourism operators gradually became established, there was talk of further development – a ski field was proposed on the slopes of Mount Arthur in 1937, though access issues saw this fall through in favour of mountains in the Nelson Lakes area which could be more easily reached.

By the 1940s, calls were being made to protect the Arthur Range and other mountainous terrain in the region as conservation land, such as through an expansion to Abel Tasman National Park. The land was eventually protected as part of North West Nelson Forest Park, however frequent proposals for development highlighted the inadequacy of this protection. Throughout the 1980s and 1990s, conservation groups lobbied for the northwest of the South Island to be designated as a national park. This was eventually successful, with much of the former forest park – including the Arthur Range – forming the new Kahurangi National Park in 1996. The range remains protected as part of the national park to this day, and is a popular tramping destination.

In 2014, to recognise the significance of the range to local Māori, the range became one of hundreds of geographic features in New Zealand to be given an official dual name. The name was established through a Treaty of Waitangi settlement between Ngāti Kōata and the Crown, along with several other dual names in the same area.

== Ecology ==
Fossils and sub-fossils of at least 20 species of birds dating to the Pleistocene and Holocene have been found in the Hodges Creek cave system, providing a window into the pre-human ecosystem of the region. Bones found include extinct species such as the Haast's eagle, Finsch's duck, and various types of moa, as well as extant species no longer found in the area, such as takahē, and kākāpō. The frequency at which takahē and Finsch's ducks remains are found within the cave's fossil record suggests that these species were among the most common ground birds in the area during the late Pleistocene, around 12,000 years ago. The caves are also home to troglobites, such as spiders and amphipods, which continue to be discovered as the caves are progressively explored.

Above the surface, the Wharepapa / Arthur Range is home to a wide range of plant and animal species, with 86 different species either threatened or at risk found on the range. Plant species found across the range include a variety of herbs, shrubs and grasses associated with the alpine tussock grasslands of the Tablelands, through to podocarp forests, southern rātā, kāmahi and occasional patches of mānuka scrub. Several nationally critical or endangered plants can also be found on the range, including species from Ourisia, Pittosporum, Botrychium and Melicytus among others.

As with much of New Zealand's forests, birds are the most prominent wildlife across the mountain range. The species found on the range are largely typical of that in the rest of the island, with alpine birds such as the kea and New Zealand rock wren recorded in the area, as well as more common lowland species such as the kākā, New Zealand falcon and fernbird. Although the roroa (great spotted kiwi) disappeared from the Wharepapa / Arthur Range 30 years ago, a breeding population was reintroduced to the region in 2010. The critically endangered New Zealand long-tailed bat is also believed to inhabit the range, but sightings have been infrequent since the 1970s.

Several species of geckos and skinks are also found across the mountains. In 1998, Mount Arthur was found to be home to a population of black-eyed geckos, an alpine species previously thought to only inhabit the Kaikōura Ranges 120 kilometres (75 mi) to the east. The discovery of a second population of the geckos at such a distance from the first improved the conservation prospects of the species, as did the apparent lack of any threats at Mount Arthur to the lizard. A separate species of gecko from the genus Woodworthia is restricted to the Wharepapa / Arthur Range and other nearby mountain ranges, one of several formerly grouped as regional populations of the common gecko.
