= Nettlebed Cave =

Cave in New Zealand

Coordinates: 41.2550°S 172.6928°E

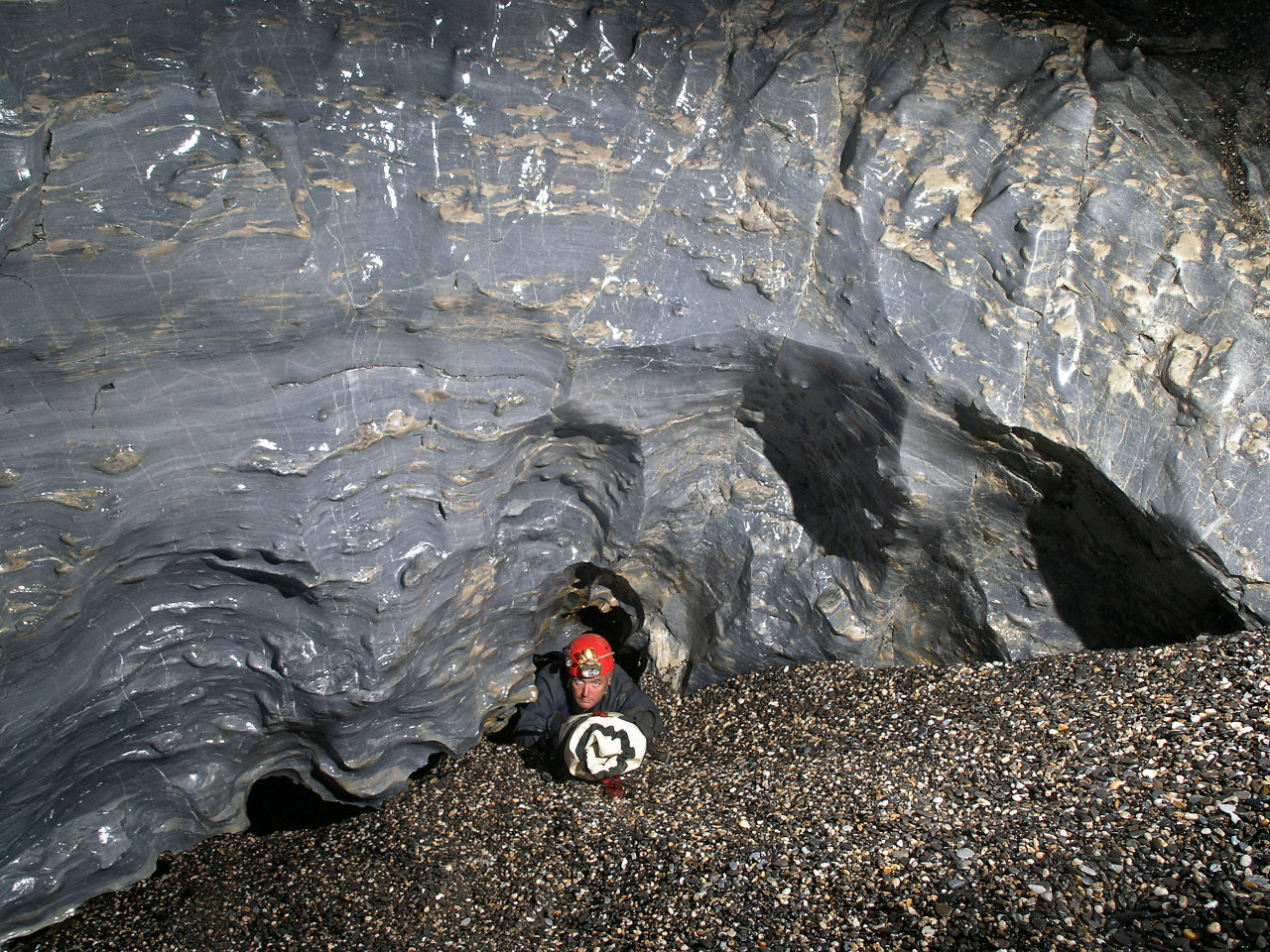
Nettlebed Cave, lower levels, New Zealand

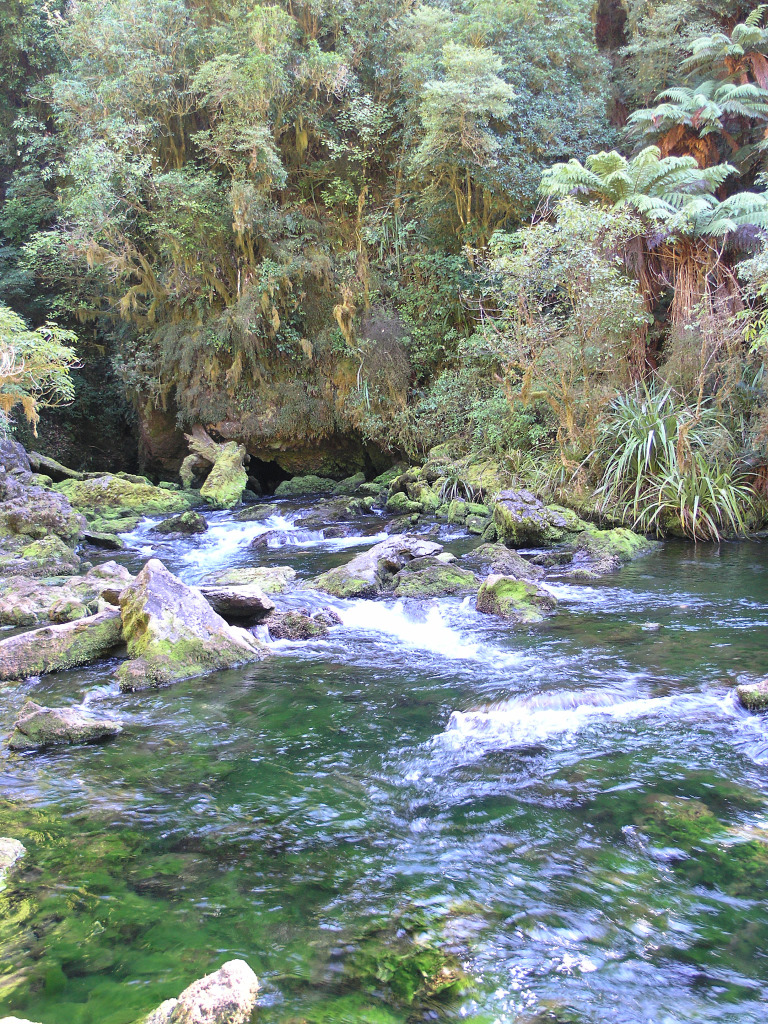
Pearse Resurgence, where water exits from Nettlebed Cave, New Zealand

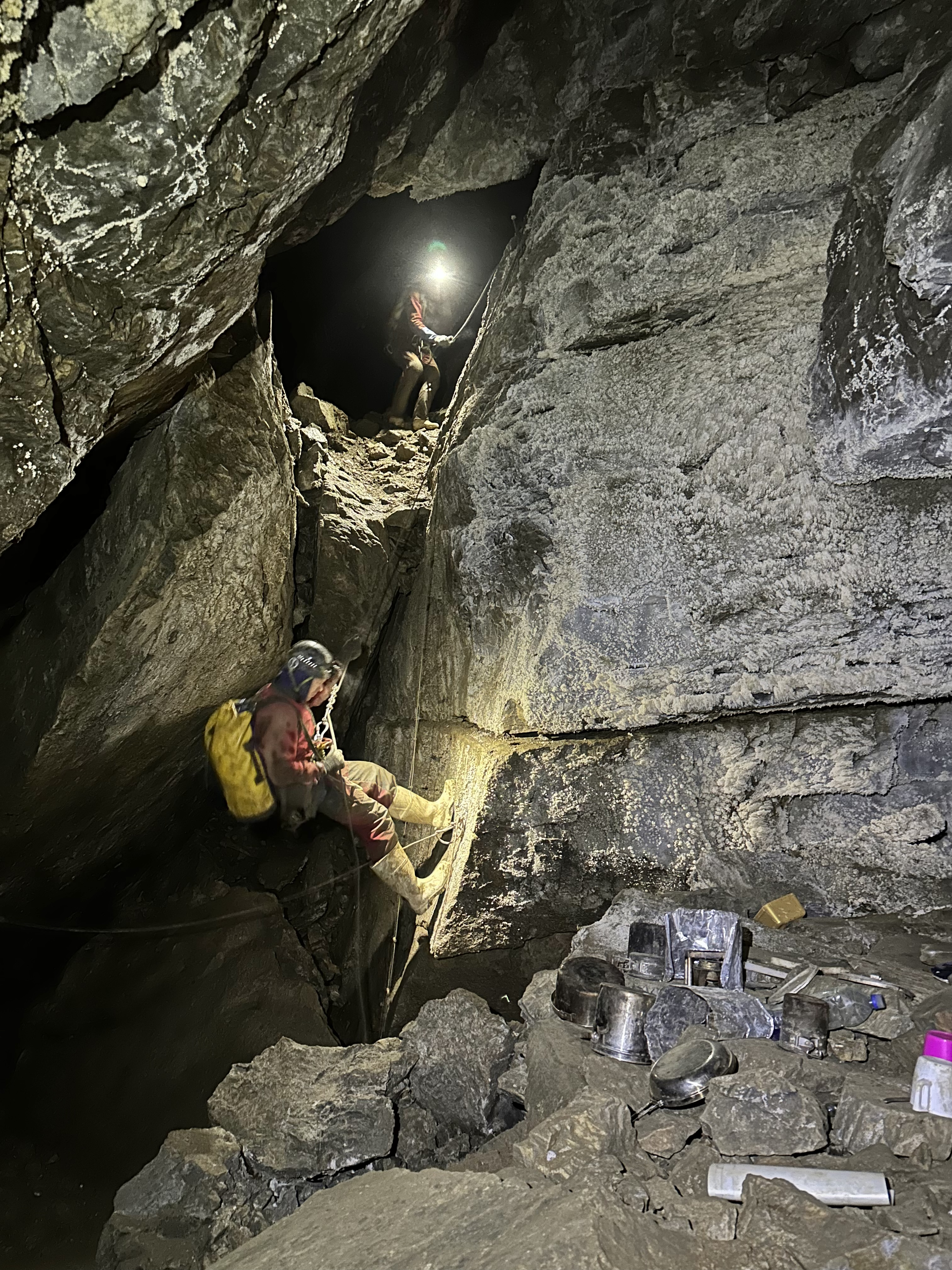
Caver descends into Soft Rock Cafe campsite, Nettlebed Cave, New Zealand

Nettlebed Cave is a limestone cave located in the Mount Arthur region of the northwest South Island of New Zealand. The presence of ongaonga (Urtica ferox), an endemic tree nettle, near the bottom entrance gives the cave its name.

Nettlebed Cave was connected to Stormy Pot in January 2014, making the system the deepest known cave in the Southern Hemisphere. Nettlebed Cave drops 1,180 metres (3,870 ft) below its upper entrance (Big Friendly Giant, Stormy Pot) to its lower exit (the Pearse River resurgence) and is 48 kilometres (30 mi) long.

== Exploration ==
Nettlebed Cave was first explored by cavers in 1969 through the dry overflow passage of a large spring pouring into the Pearse River. By 1973 1.3 kilometres (0.81 mi) of passages had been mapped. It was not until 1979 that a flowstone squeeze known as the Hinkle-horn-honking-holes was passed, making further explorations possible. Five successive Christmas expeditions (1979–80 through 1983–84) utilising underground camps at Salvation Hall and Soft Rock Cafe led to the exploration and mapping of a further 20 kilometres (12 mi).

In 1986 another cave (Blizzard Pot) was connected with Nettlebed Cave, providing an upper entrance to the system, and made the overall depth 889 metres (2,917 ft) from the highest point in Blizzard Pot to the deepest point in Nettlebed Cave.

The long-sought-after connection between Nettlebed and Stormy Pot was made from the Nettlebed side on 29 February 2014, at the end of a week-long camp at Soft Rock Cafe. After a kerosene smoke test had previously indicated a likely point of connection, a team of four (Kieran McKay, Bruce Mutton, Gavin Holden and Jonathan Ravens) dug out the rubble from a choked, drafting, rift to reach the bottom of a small muddy shaft. A tight squeeze at the top of this climb was enlarged slightly with a rock hammer to emerge at the bottom of the urinal pitch for the Rover's Return bivvi (a low sandy passage used as a temporary campsite at one of Stormy Pot's further reaches). The team were extremely grateful for the NZSS policy of carrying out all solid human waste. The overall depth of the combined system (from the top entrance, Big Friendly Giant, to the deepest surveyed point in Nettlebed's Midas Chambers) was later confirmed as 1,180 metres (3,870 ft) when an accurate GPS survey of the entrance locations was undertaken in December 2015. As of December 2019, the total surveyed length of Nettlebed/Stormy Pot is 47,969.7 metres (157,381 ft).

== Pearse Resurgence ==
The Pearse Resurgence is the source of the Pearse Stream, and is the resurgence point for all caves on Mt Arthur, including all water flowing in Nettlebed Cave (under normal water levels). This has been confirmed by positive dye tests from caves in the Ellis Basin to the south, from Windrift to the west, and from Nettlebed Cave itself.

On 21 March 2007, a team of international cave divers set a New Zealand cave diving record by reaching a depth of 177m (581 feet below ground level) in the Pearse Resurgence.

In 2011, divers reached 194 metres (636 ft) depth by placing four decompression habitats along the cave main tunnel but were still unable to trace the source.

During the 2014 Wet Mules diving expedition, the Pearse was dived to a record depth of −217 metres (−712 ft).

In 2016, Richard Harris and Dave Hurst pushed the limits of the main spring with a 13-hour dive to explore the "Second Breakfast" passage to a depth of 229 metres (751 ft) before lights began to implode causing them to turn back.

In 2020, Richard Harris and Craig Challen reached a depth of 245 metres (804 ft) in the resurgence.

== See also ==
- List of caves in New Zealand
- List of caves
