= Mount Arthur (New Zealand) =

Mountain in New Zealand

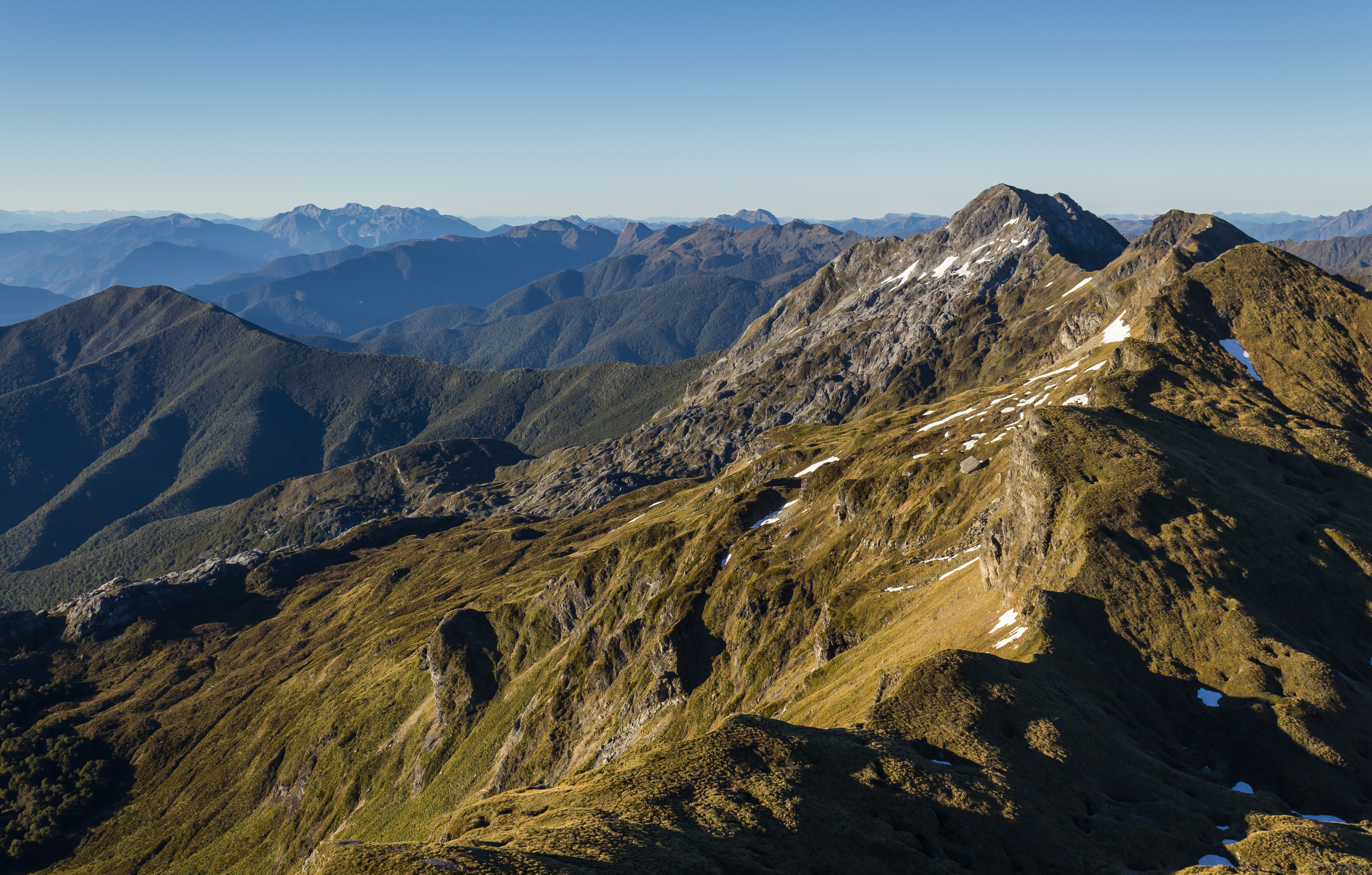
- Wharepapa / Arthur Range, taken from the track leading to the summit

Highest point
- Elevation: 1,795 m (5,889 ft)
- Listing: Mountains of New Zealand
- Coordinates: 41°13′04″S 172°40′53″E

Naming
- Native name: Tuao Wharepapa (Māori)

Geography
- Location within New Zealand
- Country: New Zealand
- District: Buller
- Protected area: Kahurangi National Park
- Parent range: Wharepapa / Arthur Range

Mount Arthur (Tuao Wharepapa in Māori) is in the Wharepapa / Arthur Range in the north western area of the South Island of New Zealand. Mount Arthur, named after Captain Arthur Wakefield, lies within Kahurangi National Park and has a peak elevation of 1,795 metres (5,889 ft).

== Geology ==
Mount Arthur is made of hard, crystalline marble, transformed (hardened) from limestone, originally laid down under the sea some 450 million years ago in the Ordovician. The "Arthur Marble" is part of the Tākaka terrane which was part of Gondwana and is similar to rocks in modern-day south-east Australia. Below ground are some of the deepest shafts and most intricate cave systems in the country, and exploration of these is far from finished. Mount Arthur is home to the Ellis Basin cave system, the deepest cave in the Southern Hemisphere, and Nettlebed Cave which was thought to be the deepest cave system the Southern Hemisphere prior to discovery of the Ellis Basin cave system in 2010.

During the ice ages small glaciers carved smooth basins called 'cirques' high on Mt Arthur, polishing and scraping the tough marble. The floors of the cirques are studded with sinkholes where surface water is taken underground into extensive cave systems.

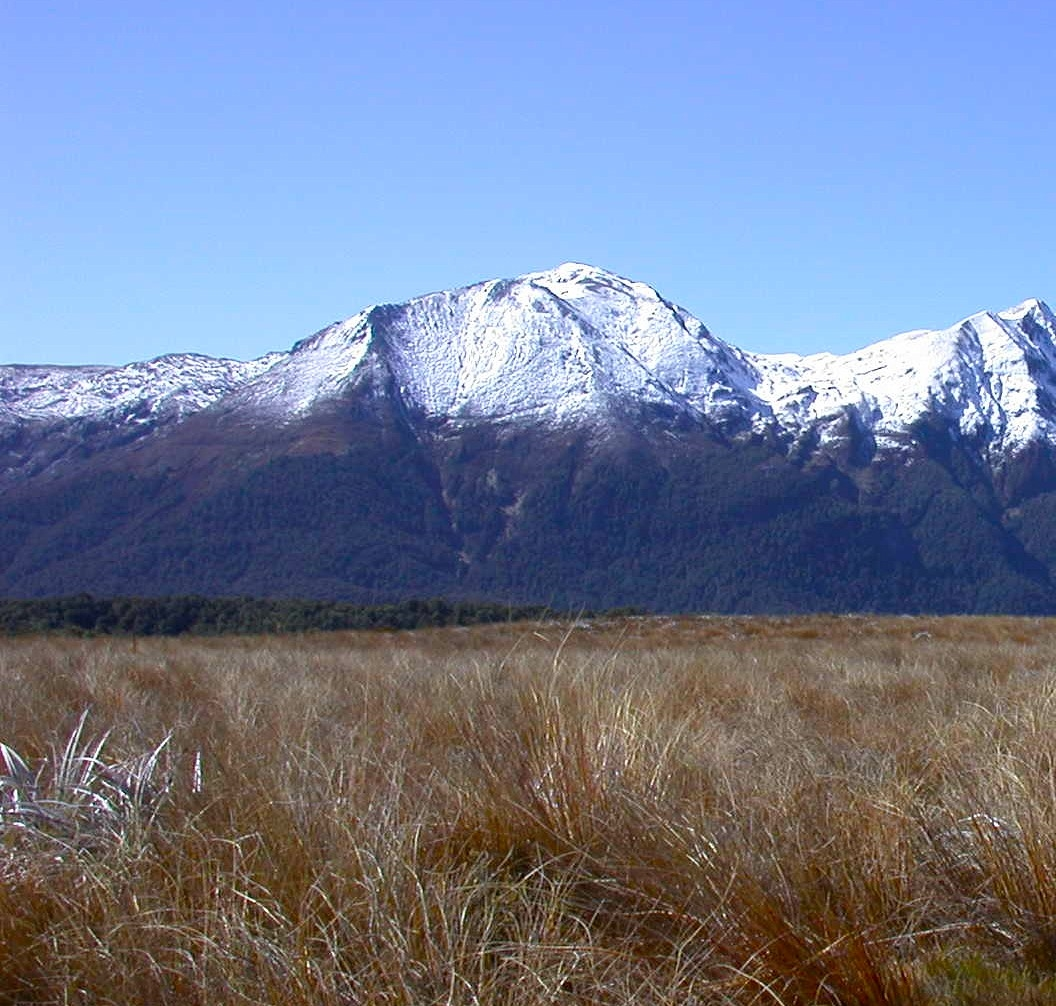
Northwest aspect of Mount Arthur

== See also ==
- Geology of New Zealand
- List of caves in New Zealand
