= Wharepapa Arthur Marble Aquifer =

Aquifer in New Zealand

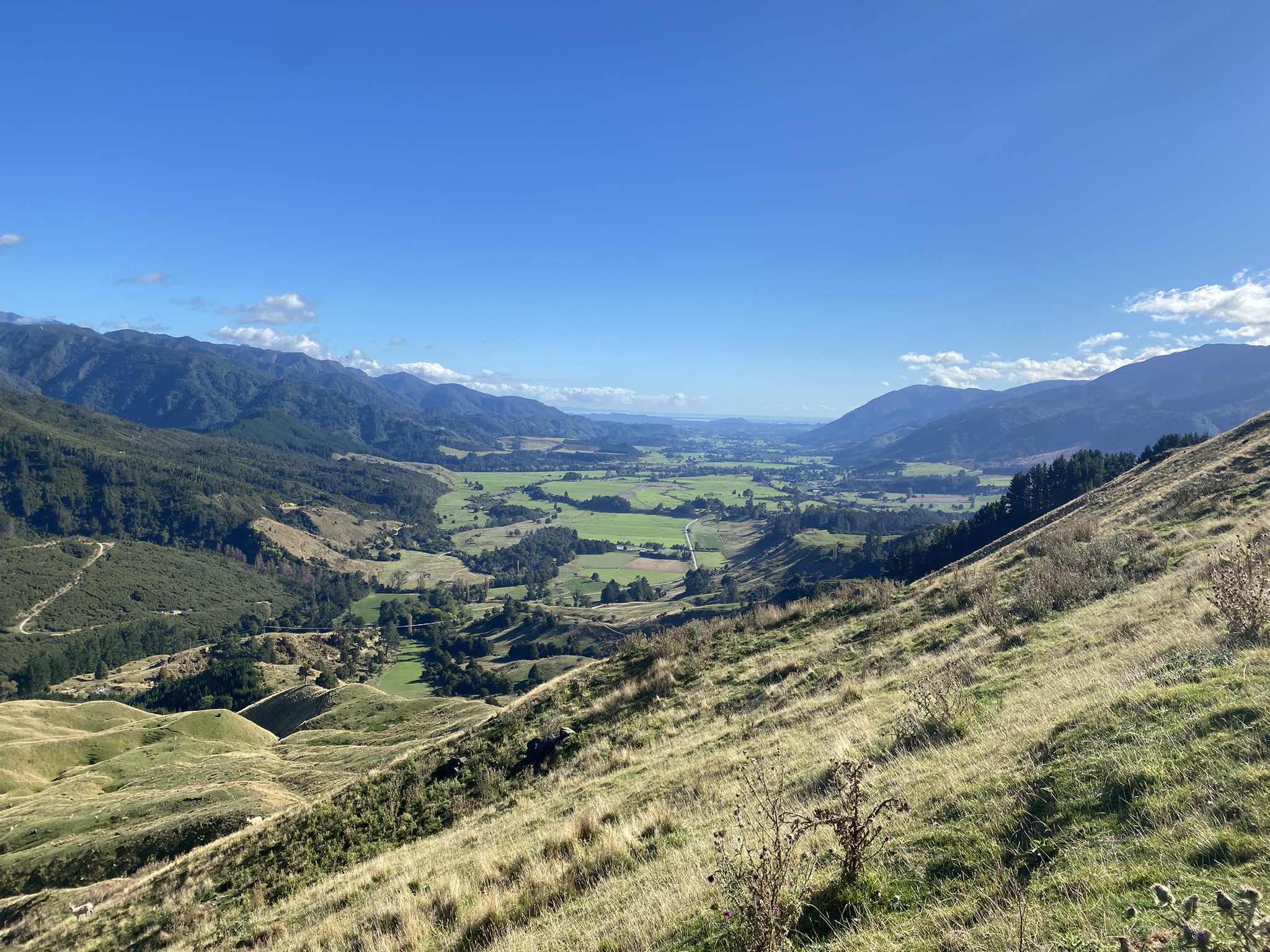
- View north along the Tākaka Valley
- Interactive map of Wharepapa Arthur Marble Aquifer
- Location: Golden Bay / Mohua
- Coordinates: 40°51′57″S 172°46′39″E
- Type: Aquifer
- Primary inflows: Tākaka River, Waingaro River and karst uplands
- Catchment area: 940 km^{2} (360 sq mi)

The Wharepapa Arthur Marble Aquifer is a complex karst aquifer system beneath the Tākaka Valley in Golden Bay / Mohua in the South Island of New Zealand. The aquifer is the source of the water that flows from the Te Waikoropupū Springs near Tākaka. Recharge of the aquifer occurs from a mix of sources, including water infiltrating from the channels of the Tākaka and Waingaro rivers. Discharge from the aquifer occurs at Te Waikoropupū Springs and submarine springs offshore.

In October 2023, the Wharepapa Arthur Marble Aquifer system and Te Waikoropupū Springs received protection through a water conservation order, the highest level of protection that a body of water can receive in New Zealand. However, the Fast-track Approvals Act passed in 2024 overrides the Resource Management Act and can thus nullify the water conservation order.

== Geology ==
There are large areas of marble in the catchment area, including 141 km^{2} (54 sq mi) in the basin of the Tākaka River, with a further area of 18 km^{2} (6.9 sq mi) extending beyond the springs towards the sea. Tākaka Limestone of Oligocene age outcrops over an area of 80 km^{2} (31 sq mi). Around 50 km^{2} (19 sq mi) overlies marble in the valley. The two carbonate rock formations together cover a total area of 210 km^{2} (81 sq mi), and subterranean drainage through channels and caves in these carbonate rocks carries half of all the water flows in the Tākaka valley. The marble beneath the valley floor extends from Upper Tākaka to the coast – a distance of around 25 km (16 mi). The thickness of the marble layer is over 500 m (1,600 ft) in places.

== Aquifer system ==
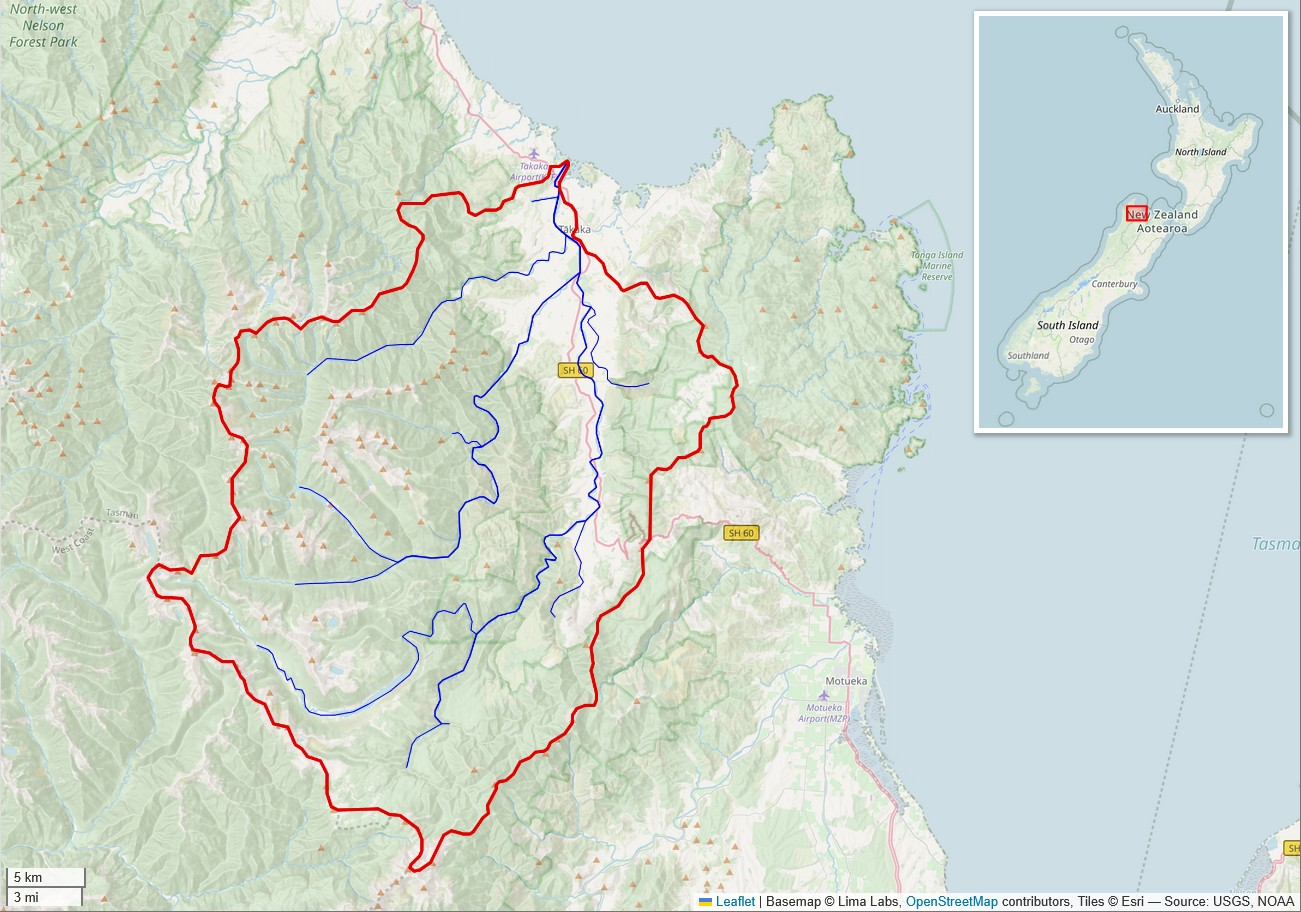
Tākaka River basin (Interactive map)

The aquifer system is located in the Tākaka River basin which covers an area of 940 km^{2} (360 sq mi) and rises to an elevation of 1,650 m (5,410 ft) above sea level. The groundwater is contained within karstified Arthur Marble of Ordovician age.

The Tākaka Valley has three main aquifers that are associated with differences in geology and lithology in the area. The three aquifers are the Tākaka Unconfined Gravel Aquifer, Tākaka Limestone Aquifer and the Wharepapa Arthur Marble Aquifer. These three aquifers exhibit both unconfined and confined characteristics, and there are complex interactions/connections between them and the surface water in rivers and streams in the area. The aquifer has an unconfined region in the upper and middle parts of the catchment, but is confined in the lower regions.

The catchment area that drains to Te Waikoropupu Springs is around 714 km^{2} (276 sq mi). Recharge of the portion of the aquifer that supplies the Te Waikoropupū Springs occurs in four zones:

- a section of about 4.5 km (2.8 mi) of the Tākaka River
- a section of about 4 km (2.5 mi) of the lower Waingaro River
- an area of around 100 km^{2} (39 sq mi) of karst uplands on the east and west sides of the Tākaka Valley
- around 49 km^{2} (19 sq mi) of terraces and flood plains in the middle of the Tākaka Valley

The karst aquifer cannot be considered as a single well-mixed reservoir. Samples of water taken from different parts of the aquifer show different isotopic signatures and different ages. This complexity arises from diverse physical structures. The karst has many hydraulically connected fissures where the water flow may be slow. However, there are also conduits and caves where relatively fast flow occurs.

The aquifer is very large, with a thickness of up to 500 m (1,600 ft), and a total volume of 3.4 km^{3} (0.82 cu mi). The average transit time of water moving through the aquifer is eight years.

Discharge from the Wharepapa Arthur Marble Aquifer occurs at Te Waikoropupū Springs and submarine springs offshore.

== Te Waikoropupū Springs ==
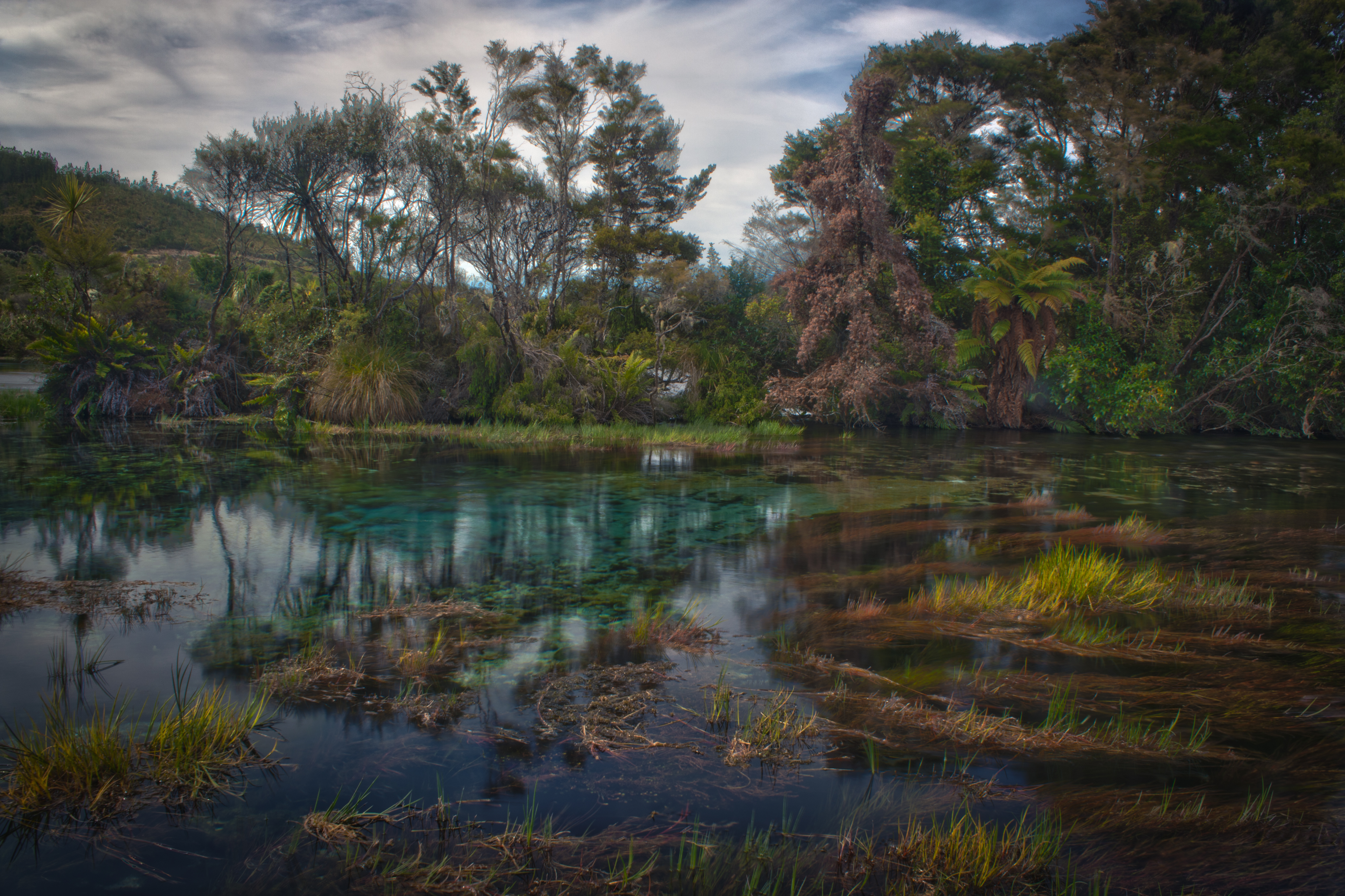
Te Waikoropupū Springs

The Wharepapa Arthur Marble Aquifer supplies Te Waikoropupū Springs, the largest springs in New Zealand. The springs are included on the World Karst Aquifer Map. Te Waikoropupū Springs have the clearest water ever recorded outside of Antarctica with a median visibility of 62 m (203 ft). The springs have a mean outflow of 13.4 m^{3}/s and are the largest springs in New Zealand and amongst the largest in the Southern Hemisphere. The exceptional clarity of the water in the springs is attributed to a combination of long residence time, slow movement of water underground, and the filtration of organic matter by stygofauna in the aquifer. The water discharged from the springs has a high concentration of calcium, derived from the calcium carbonate in the marble aquifer. The calcium flowing from the springs implies the annual loss of 47,000 tonnes of marble dissolving in the aquifer.

Measurements of nitrate-nitrogen (nitrate-N) in the waters of the springs have increased over a period of 50 years. The increasing level of these nutrients in the water was one of the factors leading to an application for a Water Conservation Order to protect the springs.

== Water Conservation Order ==
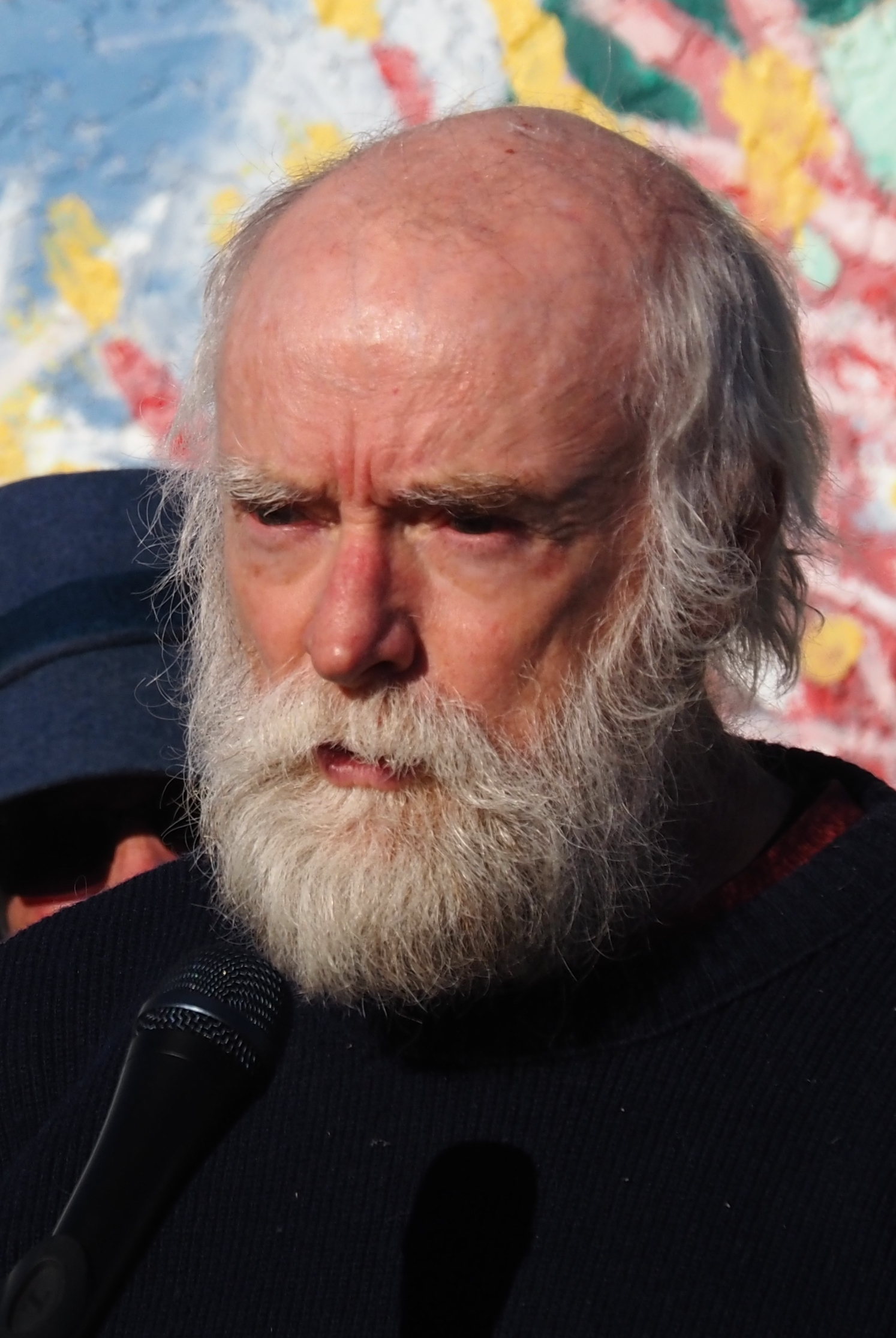
Yuill in 2024

Over a period of 10 years, a Golden Bay resident Andrew Yuill in association with Ngāti Tama Ki Te Waipounamu Trust prepared an application for a Water Conservation Order (WCO) to protect the Te Waikoropupū Springs, the aquifer and associated bodies of water. In 2017, the Minister for the Environment accepted the application and referred it to a special tribunal for consideration. The application was publicly notified on 31 January 2018. In March 2020, the Special Tribunal recommended that a Water Conservation Order should be granted. In October 2023, the Wharepapa Arthur Marble Aquifer system and Te Waikoropupū Springs received protection through the granting of a water conservation order, the highest level of protection that a body of water can receive in New Zealand. A WCO receives its statutory standing through the Resource Management Act 1991 (RMA). However, the Fast-track Approvals Act passed in 2024 overrides the RMA and can thus nullify the WCO.

== See also ==
- Geology and geomorphology of Kahurangi National Park
- Geology of the Tasman District
