= Te Waikoropupū Springs =

Spring in New Zealand

Coordinates: 40°50′52″S 172°46′10″E

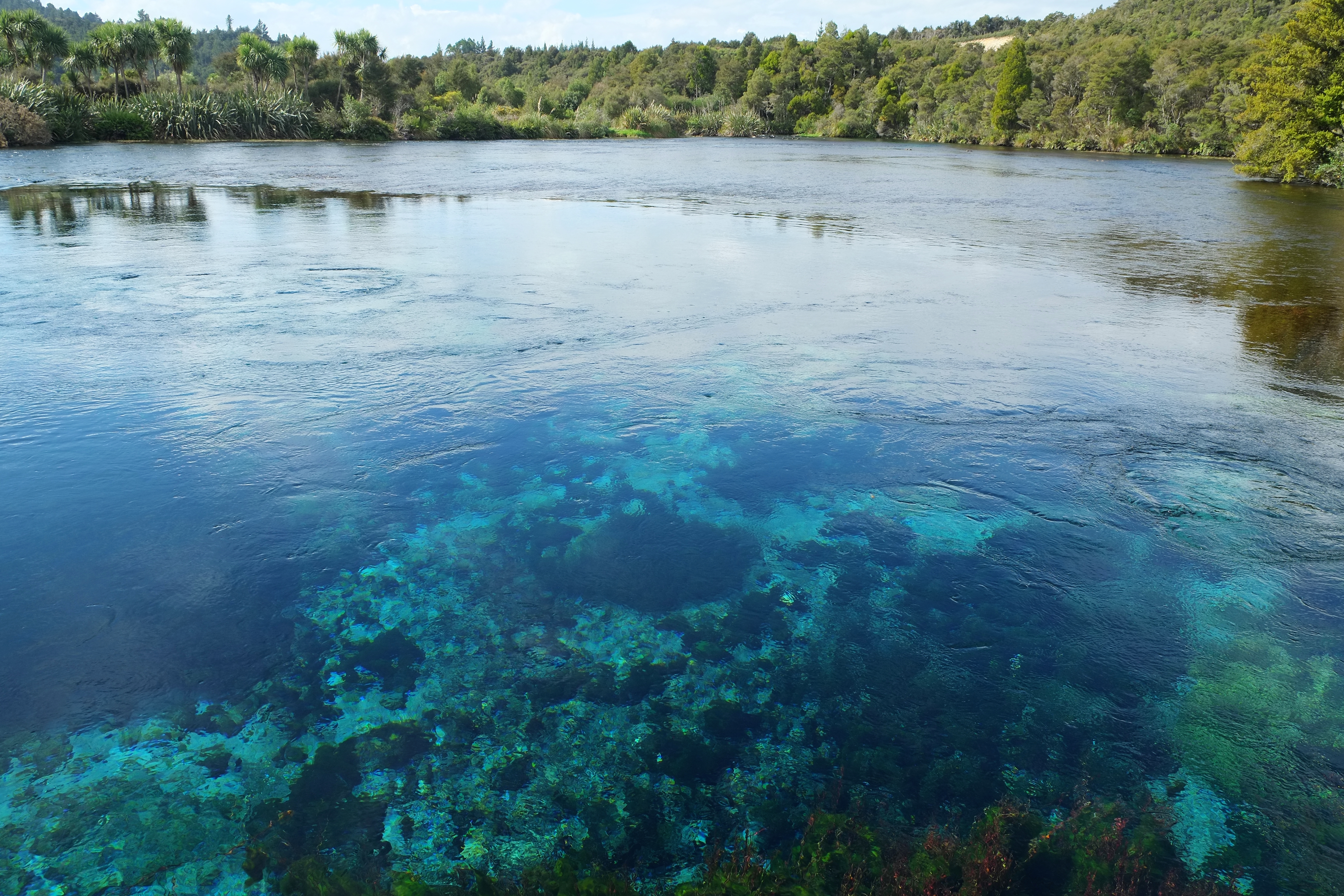
- Interactive map of Te Waikoropupū Springs
- Location: Tākaka, Tasman District, New Zealand
- Spring source: Wharepapa Arthur Marble; Aquifer
- Elevation: 20 m (66 ft)
- Type: Karst spring
- Discharge: 13.4 m^{3}/s

Te Waikoropupū Springs, also known as Pupu Springs and Waikaremumu Springs, are located near Tākaka in Golden Bay, in the Tasman District of the South Island of New Zealand. The springs are known for the exceptional clarity of the water, and the volume of water discharged. They are the largest cold–water springs in the Southern Hemisphere. The springs are spiritually significant to Māori people. The springs feed Te Waikoropupū River, a short tributary of the Tākaka River.

A water conservation order for Te Waikoropupū Springs and the Wharepapa Arthur Marble Aquifer was made in October 2023, giving them the highest level of legal protection for a body of water.

== Spiritual significance ==
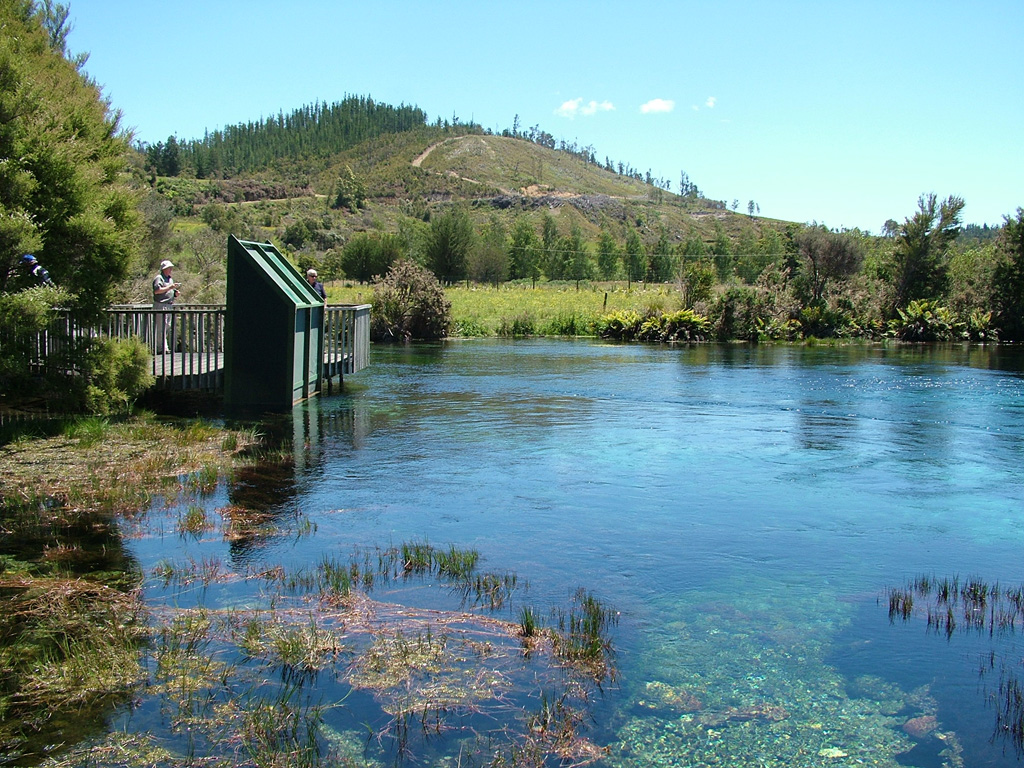

The springs are considered as sacred by the local iwi, and have been registered as wāhi tapu with the Māori Heritage Council of Heritage New Zealand. Waikoropupū is the legendary home of the female taniwha Huriawa, one of the three main taniwha of Aotearoa. She is a diver of land and sea, travelling deep beneath the earth to clear blocked waterways. She is brave and wise and believed to still rest in the waters of Waikoropupū, when she is not away attending to business.

On signboards at the entrance to the springs, and in submissions seeking protection of the springs, iwi have stated:

The waters of Te Waikoropupū represent the lifeblood of Papatūānuku [earth] and the tears of Ranginui [sky], symbolising the link between past and present.

At the entrance to the walkway to the springs, the Department of Conservation has placed a sign:

"Te Waikoropupū Springs are a taonga (treasure) and wāhi tapu (a sacred place) for Māori, both locally and nationally. The legends of Te Waikoropupū are told in the stories of Huriawa, its taniwha (guardian spirit). In Māori tradition the Springs are waiora, the purest form of water which is the wairua (spiritual) and the physical source of life. The Springs provide water for healing, and in the past were a place of ceremonial blessings at times of birth and death and the leaving and returning of travellers."

== Aquifer ==
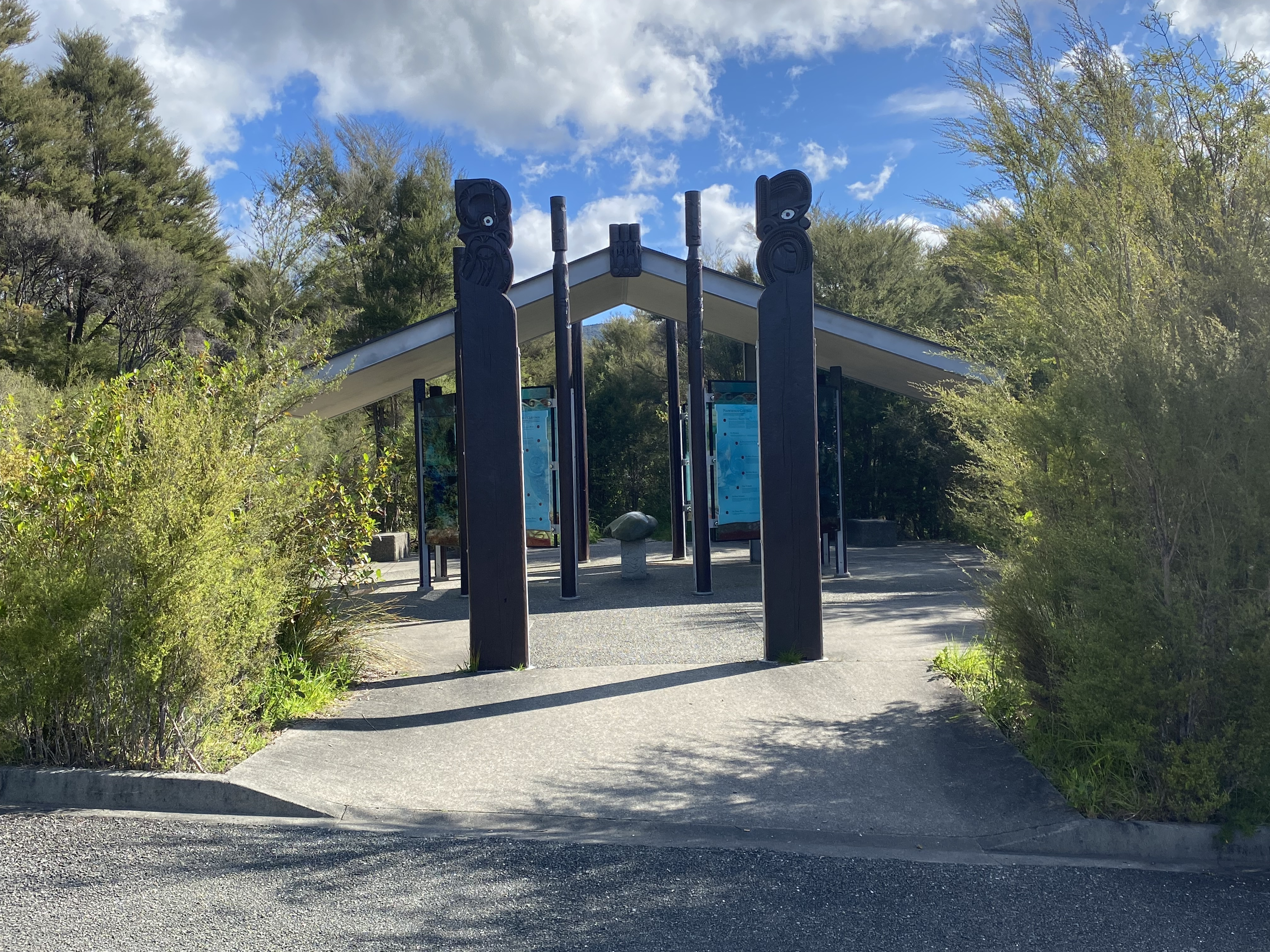
Te Waikoropupū Springs entrance

The source of the springs is an aquifer beneath the Tākaka Valley. The catchment that supplies the aquifer covers an area of 940 km^{2} (360 sq mi), and rises to an elevation of 1,650 m (5,410 ft). The aquifer beneath the valley has three different types; the Tākaka Unconfined Gravel Aquifer, Takaka Limestone Aquifer and the Wharepapa Arthur Marble Aquifer. There are complex interactions between surface water and these aquifers, but the Wharepapa Arthur Marble Aquifer is the main source for Te Waikoropupū Springs.

== Volume of water ==
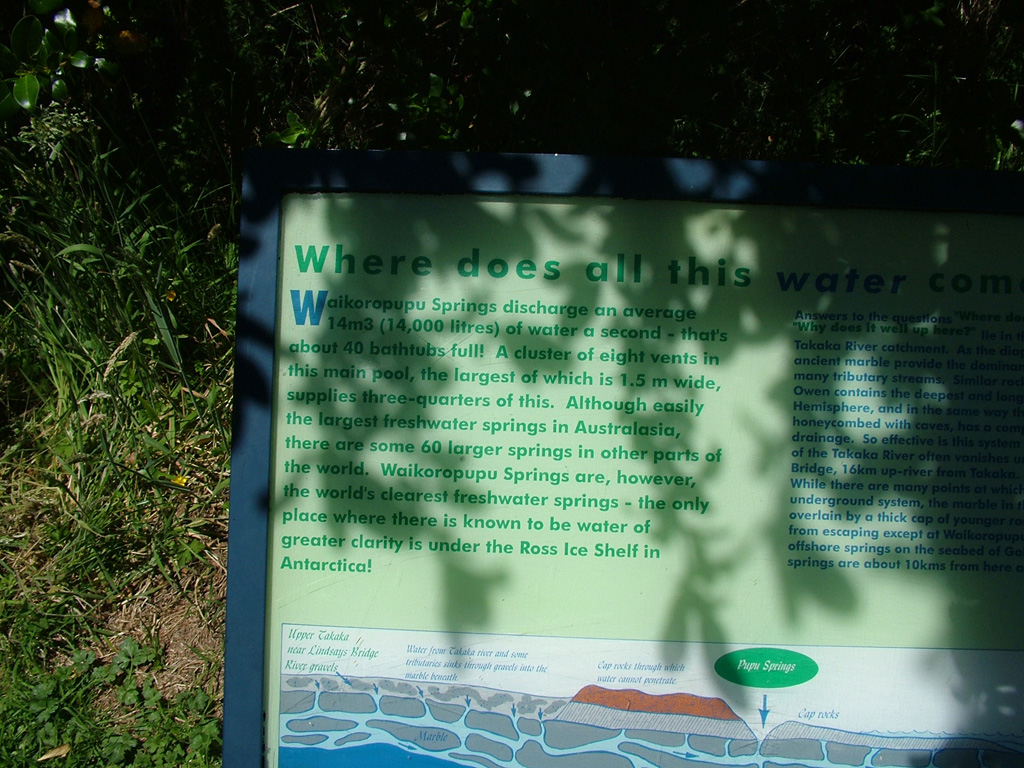
Information regarding the spring

The Te Waikoropupū Springs are notable for the volume of water discharged from the eight main vents. They are the largest cold–water springs in the Southern Hemisphere, with a mean outflow of 13.4 m^{3}/s. The floor of the springs lake is covered with white sand. Waters expelled from some of the smaller vents carry the sand upward. These vents are known as the 'dancing sands', which for the few scuba divers who have secured permission to dive in the springs, is one of the highlights of underwater sightseeing.

== Water clarity ==
The water discharged from the springs is the clearest that has ever been recorded from a karst spring. The horizontal visibility of the constantly 11.7 °C cool water in the springs has been measured at an average of 63 metres, and until 2011 was considered second only to sub-glacial water in the Antarctic. Since that year, however, the record holder for fresh water clarity is Blue Lake, also in Tasman District.

The exceptional clarity of the water in the springs is attributed to a combination of long residence time, slow movement of water underground, and the filtration of organic matter by stygofauna in the aquifer.

Measurements of nitrate-nitrogen (nitrate-N) in the waters of the springs have increased over a period of 50 years. The increasing level of these nutrients in the water was one of the factors leading to an application for a Water Conservation Order to protect the springs.

== Environmental protection ==
In July 2023 the Environment Court recommended that the Minister for the Environment make a Water Conservation Order (WCO) for Te Waikoropupū Springs and the Wharepapa Arthur Marble Aquifer, the highest legal protection available for a body of water. The WCO came into effect in October 2023. However, the Sixth National Government of New Zealand passed the Fast-track Approvals Act in December 2024. This legislation overrides the RMA and can thus nullify the WCO.
