= Lake Killarney (New Zealand) =

Lake in Tākaka, New Zealand

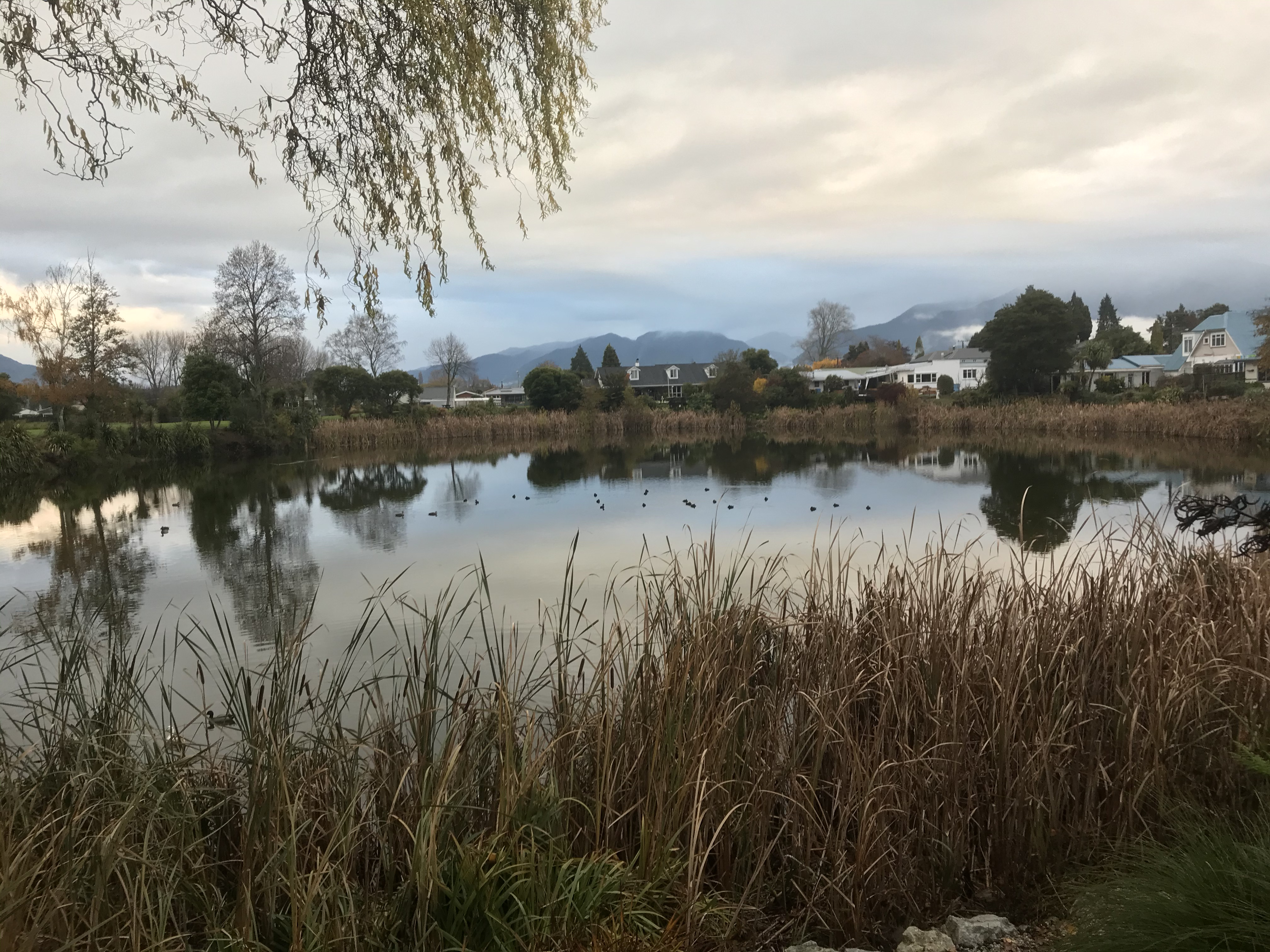
- Lake Killarney

- Location within South Island
- Location: Tākaka, Tasman District, South Island
- Coordinates: 40°51′7.2″S 172°48′28.8″E
- Primary inflows: Two stormwater drains
- Primary outflows: None
- Basin countries: New Zealand
- Surface elevation: 11 m (36 ft)
- Settlements: Tākaka

Lake Killarney is a small lake in New Zealand's South Island. It is in Tākaka just off State Highway 60. Previously used for swimming, it is now polluted due to nutrient runoff. Efforts are underway to improve water quality.

Lake Killarney is a natural sinkhole filled with groundwater. It is located on the boundary between residential housing (along Commercial Street, which is State Highway 60) and farmland. Up until the 1950s, the water was clear, and locals used the lake for swimming.

Lake Killarney has no natural inflows but received overland flow during storm events. It also has no outflow. In the 1970s, two stormwater pipes—draining Commercial Street (State Highway 60) and Meihana Street—were connected to the lake. In 2004, the nearby Fonterra dairy factory installed a sump in its farmland that was connected to the Meihana Street drain. By 2015, this sump had been removed again. Nutrients flowing into the lake has caused a degradation of the water quality. Tākaka has no reticulated drinking water network and those bores down gradient of the lake may have compromised water quality.

The first algal bloom occurred in 2014. In subsequent summers, the size of the algal blooms covered more of the lake's surface and they lasted for longer. Investigations found that the layer of sludge that had washed into the lake was 0.7 m (2 ft 4 in) thick and would cost NZ$160,000 to remove. The sludge contained "extremely high phosphorus levels" at levels not seen before by scientists from the National Institute of Water and Atmospheric Research (NIWA). In 2019, a swale was built between the lake and the farmland that stopped further nutrients from washing into the lake.

The dominant aquatic plant in the lake is Lagarosiphon, which on average is 4 m (13 ft) tall. The New Zealand grebe lives on the lake.

A nearby sinkhole (40.84560°S 172.81912°E)—known as Blue Lake or Lake Rototai—has no stormwater drains running into it. That lake has retained its clear water.
