= Te Waikoropupū River =

River in Tasman District, New Zealand

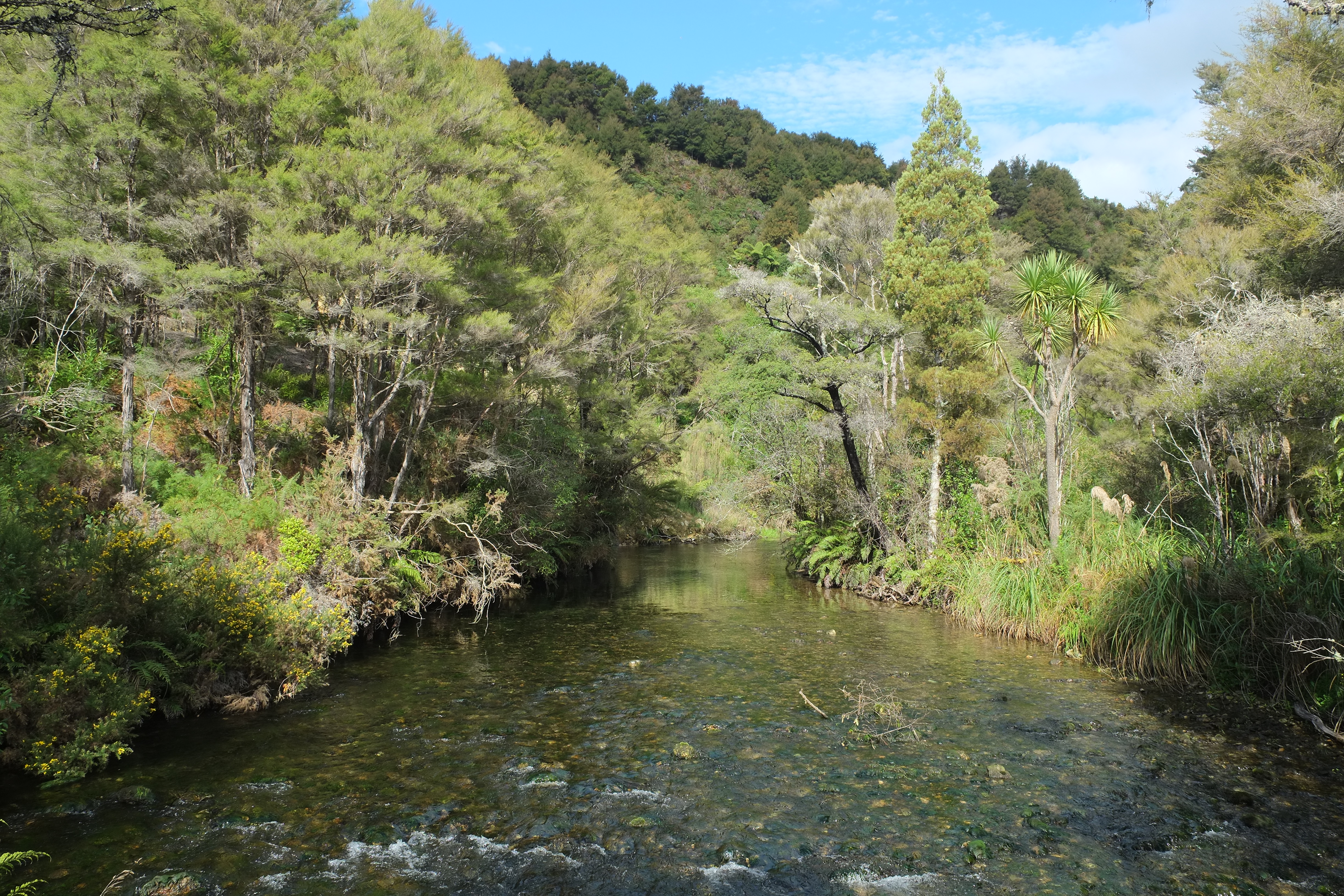
- Te Waikoropupū River near Te Waikoropupū Springs
- Route of Te Waikoropupū River
- Mouth of Te Waikoropupū River Te Waikoropupū River (South Island)

Location
- Country: New Zealand

Physical characteristics
- Source
  - location: Haupiri Range
  - coordinates: 40°50′47″S 172°40′30″E
- Mouth
  - location: Tākaka River
  - coordinates: 40°50′22″S 172°47′36″E
- Length: 15 km (9.3 mi)

Basin features
- Progression: Little Ōnahau River → Tākaka River → Golden Bay / Mohua → Tasman Sea
- Tributaries
  - left: Campbell Creek
  - right: Page Creek

Te Waikoropupū River, previously known as the Waikoropupū River, is a river of the Tasman Region of New Zealand's South Island. It originates in the Kahurangi National Park and flows generally northeast to reach the Tākaka River close to the town of Tākaka. On its way it passes close to the Te Waikoropupū Springs, which drain into the river and add significantly to its water volume.

== See also ==
- List of rivers of New Zealand
