= Anatoki River =

River in Tasman District, New Zealand

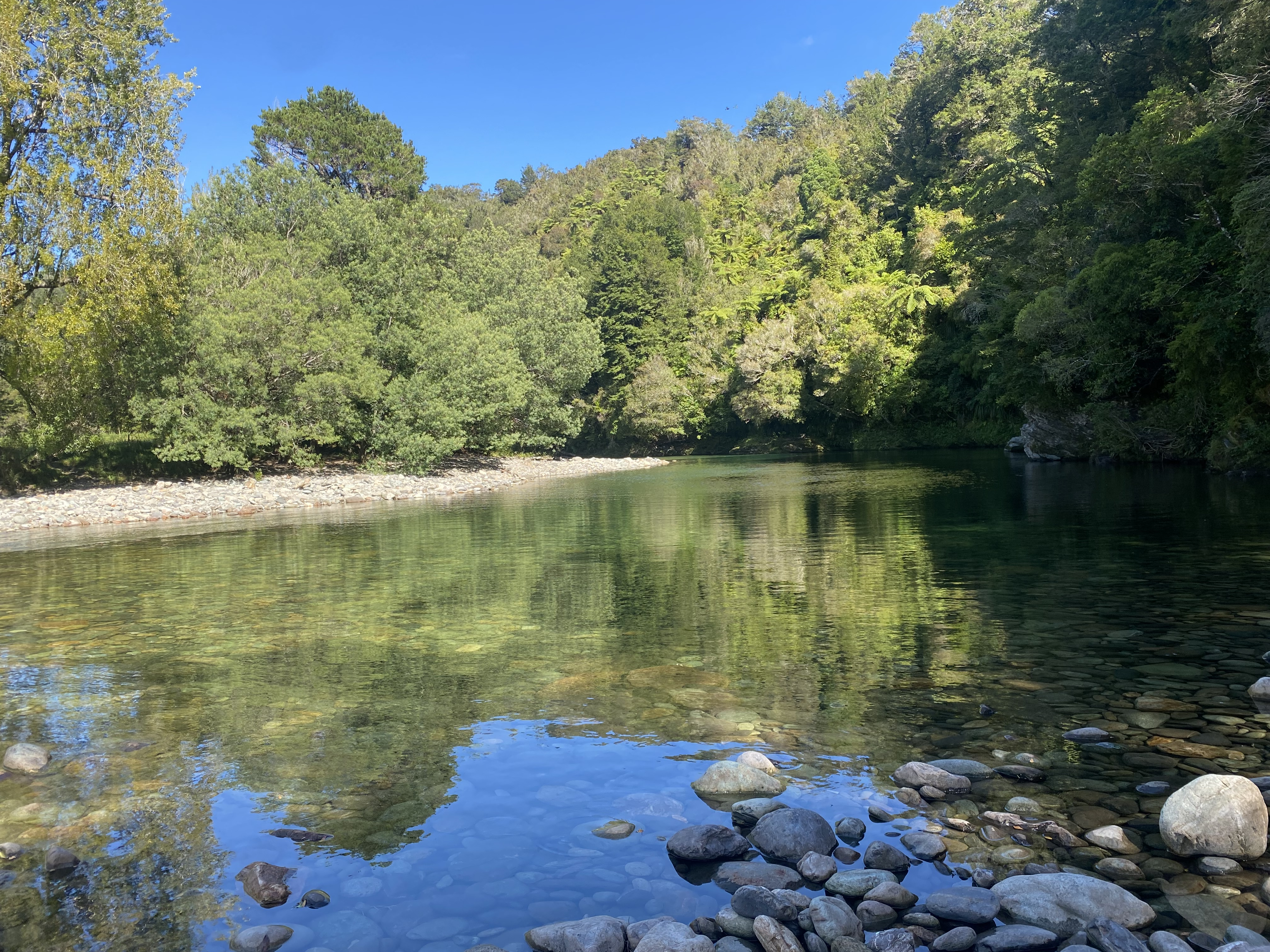
- Route of the Anatoki River
- Mouth of the Anatoki River Anatoki River (South Island)

Location
- Country: New Zealand

Physical characteristics
- Source
  - location: Haupiri Range
  - coordinates: 40°57′23″S 172°32′17″E
- Mouth
  - location: Tākaka River
  - coordinates: 40°51′40″S 172°47′59″E
- Basin size: 101 km²

Basin features
- Progression: Anatoki River → Tākaka River → Golden Bay / Mohua → Tasman Sea
- Tributaries
  - left: Paradise Creek, Handcock Creek, Sheepy Creek
  - right: Go Ahead Creek

The Anatoki River is a river of New Zealand. It is located in the Tasman Region, and is a tributary of the Tākaka River and is one of the country's steepest rivers. The river's name means cave of stone adzes. The river drains a catchment area of 101 km^{2} (39 sq mi) that is surrounded by the Haupiri, Douglas, Snowdon, Devil and Anatoki Ranges. Rainfall records in the catchment taken at an elevation of 1,300 m (4,300 ft) show that the 10 year return period storm brings 291 mm (11.5 in) of precipitation in 24 hours.

Anatoki Salmon, a salmon farm and restaurant business, is located adjacent to the Anatoki River.

== See also ==
- List of rivers of New Zealand
