= Water conservation order =

Legal instrument in New Zealand

A water conservation order (WCO) is a legal ruling to protect aspects of water bodies. It may be to protect the quantity of the water itself or for any issues relating to the water body as a whole. Since 1984, sixteen WCOs have been passed, with a gap of 15 years between the last two: the 2008 Oreti River WCO and the 2023 Te Waikoropupū Springs WCO.

== New Zealand ==
In New Zealand, a Water Conservation Order is used to protect the natural, cultural and recreational values of any water body. Water Conservation Orders came about as a result of lobbying by a group of stakeholders in the late seventies. At that time rivers were managed through the Water & Soil Conservation Act, which was administered by an appointed statutory body (NWASCA) serviced by the Ministry of Works. The engineers of the Ministry of Works argued that there was no need to legislate further as the Act contained provision for setting Minimum Flows.

Seven WCOs were passed prior to the Resource Management Act 1991 (RMA) coming into place. Since the passing of the RMA, a further nine WCOs have been created. Hence, there are currently 16 separate Water Conservation Orders:

WCO	Year	Legislation
Mōtū River	1984	pre-RMA
Rakaia River	1988	pre-RMA
Lake Wairarapa	1989	pre-RMA
Manganuioteao River	1989	pre-RMA
Ahuriri River	1990	pre-RMA
Lake Ellesmere / Te Waihora	1990	pre-RMA
Grey River / Māwheranui	1991	pre-RMA
Rangitīkei River	1993	RMA
Kawarau River	1997	RMA
Mataura River	1997	RMA
Buller River	2001	RMA
Mohaka River	2004	RMA
Motueka River	2004	RMA
Rangitata River	2006	RMA
Ōreti River	2008	RMA
Te Waikoropupū Springs and Wharepapa Arthur Marble Aquifer	2023	RMA

A water conservation order has been proposed for the Hurunui River in the South Island.

Irrigation New Zealand, the national body representing agricultural irrigators and the irrigation industry, opposes water conservation orders. Irrigation NZ considers they no longer have relevance, they lock up the water resource and they may bankrupt the nation.
