= Tākaka =

Town in Golden Bay, New Zealand

- Town
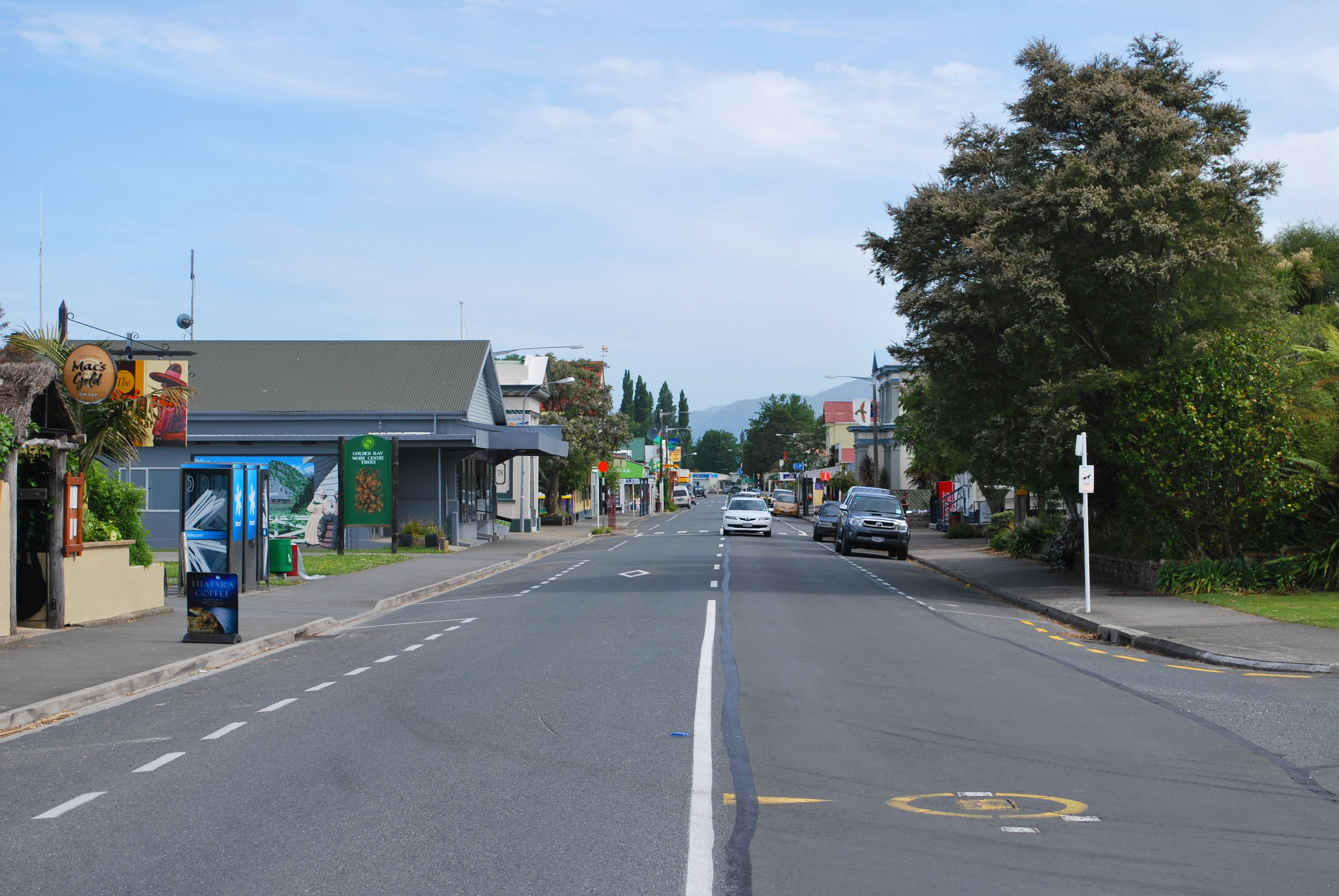
- Commercial Street (State Highway 60), the main street of Tākaka
- Interactive map of Tākaka
- Coordinates: 40°51′15″S 172°48′25″E
- Country: New Zealand
- Territorial authority: Tasman
- Ward: Golden Bay Ward
- Community: Golden Bay Community
- Electorates: West Coast-Tasman; Te Tai Tonga (Māori)

Government
  - Territorial authority: Tasman District Council
  - Mayor of Tasman: Tim King
  - West Coast-Tasman MP: Katie Milne
  - Te Tai Tonga MP: Mananui Ramsden

Area
  - Total: 12.52 km^{2} (4.83 sq mi)

Population (June 2025)
  - Total: 1,440
  - Density: 115/km^{2} (298/sq mi)
- Time zone: UTC+12 (New Zealand Standard Time)
  - Summer (DST): UTC+13 (New Zealand Daylight Time)
- Postcode: 7110

Tākaka is a small town situated at the southeastern end of Golden Bay, at the northern end of New Zealand's South Island, located on the lower reaches of the Tākaka River. State Highway 60 runs through Takaka and follows the river valley before climbing over Tākaka Hill, to Motueka (57 km away) linking Golden Bay with the more populated coast of Tasman Bay to the southeast. The town is served by Tākaka Aerodrome.

== History ==
The area has long had Māori settlement. An early nation is Ngāti Tumatakōkiri, then Ngāti Apa and today the iwi are known as Manawhenua ki Mohua Ngāti Tama, Ngāti Rarua and Te Āti Awa, these nations (iwi) migrating from the North Island in the 1820s.

The name of the town may derive from Taha'a island in the Society Islands in French Polynesia. A local myth about a taniwha in the nearby Parapara River is similar to one told about the Parapara strait, which separates Taha'a from Motue'a island.

From 1853 to 1876, Tākaka was administered as part of the Nelson Province. Sawmilling was an important business for Tākaka in the 1870s. The Takaka tramway was built in 1880. Prior to that time timber was transported to the port by teams of bullocks which would often leave the main street of Tākaka looking like a rutted bog. After flooding in 1904 did significant damage to the tramway, it was sold in 1905 and the locomotive, rolling stock and rails were shipped to Onehunga by sea.

Tākaka contributed soldiers to the Boer War, the First World War and the Second World War with 1, 44 and 25 respectively dying in each conflict.

Onetahua Kokiri Marae (Manawhenua ki Mohua) in Pohara Valley was established in 1986, used a re-purposed school in 1992 and in 2001 a meeting house named Te Ao Marama was opened. The name comes from the name for Farewell Spit. Te Ātiawa te Waka a Māui state that "Onetahua connects ancestrally to the waka Tokomaru, the maunga Parapara and the awa Waikoropupu".

In June 2005, much of the town was temporarily evacuated after fire swept through Tākaka's biggest industrial complex, a dairy factory. There were fears that volatile chemicals stored at the plant might explode, leading to the release of poisonous gases, which later proved to be unfounded. The factory was restored later that year.

In July 2020, the name of the town was officially gazetted as Tākaka by the New Zealand Geographic Board.

== Geography ==
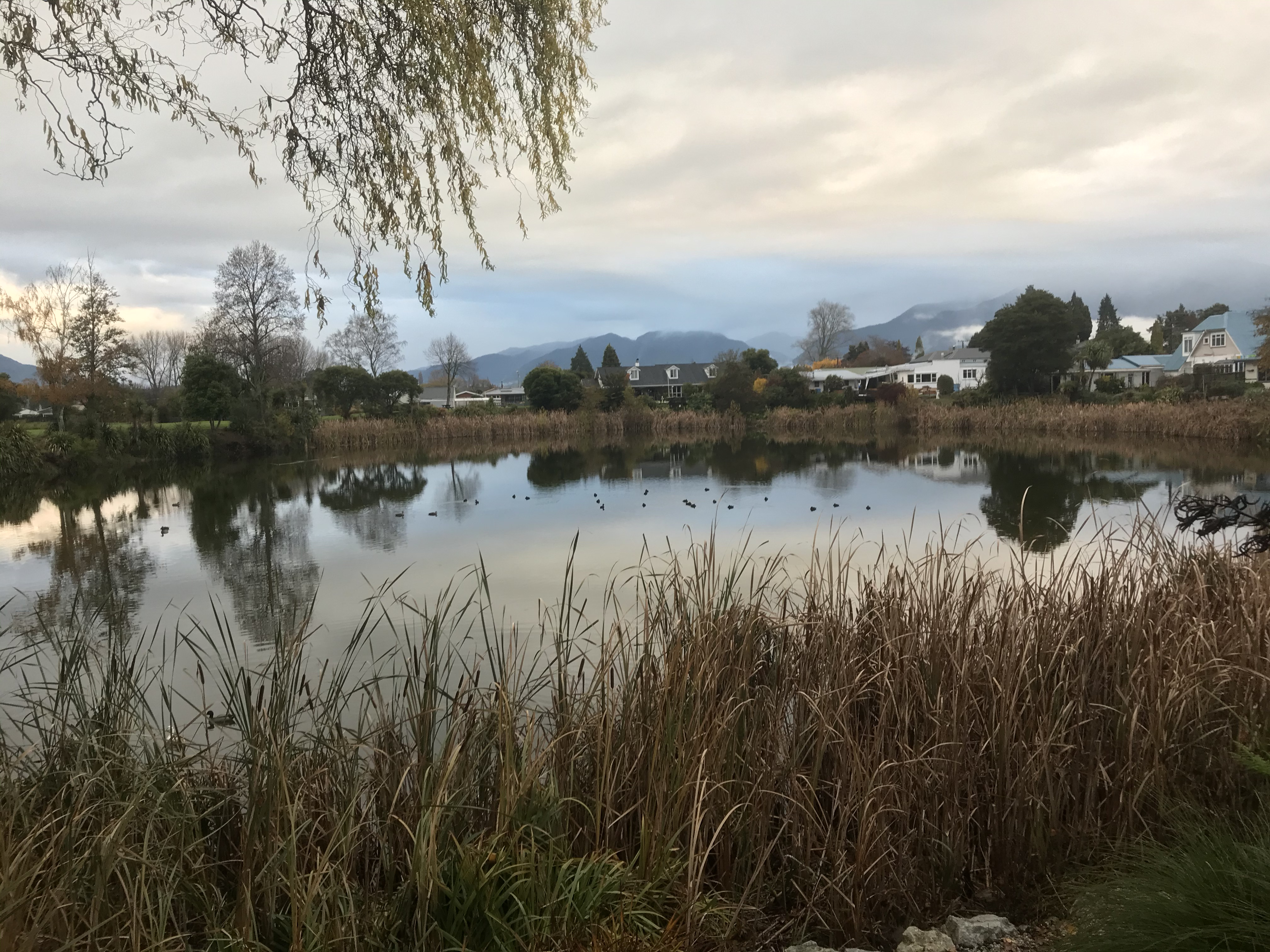
Lake Killarney

The area around Tākaka Hill is dominated by its karst geology. This creates sinkholes and cave systems, including New Zealand's deepest vertical shaft, Harwoods Hole. Lake Killarney in Tākaka is a sinkhole filled with groundwater.

Tākaka and Golden Bay are known for rock climbing, particularly around the area of Paines Ford.

The town is also known for Te Waikoropupū Springs (colloquially known as Pupu Springs).

The antipode of Tākaka is the town of Coriscada, Portugal.

== Climate ==
Tākaka is one of the warmest locations in the South Island, due to its northerly position and maritime influences from the Golden Bay. Because of the hills in the Kahurangi National Park to the south-west of Tākaka, the town receives substantially less rainfall than the West Coast. Tākaka's location on the leeward side of these hills allow the wind to become warmer and drier as it flows down towards the town, allowing an average of 22 days a year to exceed 26.7 °C (80 °F). On the contrary, being a few kilometres inland, cold air can settle over Tākaka on winter mornings, resulting in an average of 17.2 frosty days per year.

Climate data for Takaka (1991–2020)
Month	Jan	Feb	Mar	Apr	May	Jun	Jul	Aug	Sep	Oct	Nov	Dec	Year
Mean daily maximum °C (°F)	23.4 (74.1)	23.3 (73.9)	21.4 (70.5)	18.8 (65.8)	16.5 (61.7)	14.2 (57.6)	13.4 (56.1)	14.0 (57.2)	15.7 (60.3)	17.8 (64.0)	19.4 (66.9)	21.5 (70.7)	18.3 (64.9)
Daily mean °C (°F)	17.4 (63.3)	17.4 (63.3)	15.7 (60.3)	13.3 (55.9)	10.9 (51.6)	8.6 (47.5)	7.9 (46.2)	8.6 (47.5)	10.2 (50.4)	12.1 (53.8)	13.8 (56.8)	16.1 (61.0)	12.7 (54.8)
Mean daily minimum °C (°F)	11.4 (52.5)	11.6 (52.9)	10.0 (50.0)	7.8 (46.0)	5.4 (41.7)	3.1 (37.6)	2.4 (36.3)	3.3 (37.9)	4.7 (40.5)	6.5 (43.7)	8.2 (46.8)	10.7 (51.3)	7.1 (44.8)
Average rainfall mm (inches)	141.8 (5.58)	106.0 (4.17)	133.8 (5.27)	164.3 (6.47)	178.5 (7.03)	201.2 (7.92)	178.2 (7.02)	185.8 (7.31)	180.7 (7.11)	209.6 (8.25)	144.2 (5.68)	191.0 (7.52)	2,015.1 (79.33)
Mean monthly sunshine hours	251.6	223.4	213.6	174.4	163.6	143.3	156.9	171.7	183.9	221.5	237.5	225.7	2,367.1
Mean daily daylight hours	14.7	13.7	12.3	11.0	9.9	9.3	9.6	10.6	11.8	13.2	14.4	15.1	12.1
Percentage possible sunshine	55	58	56	53	53	51	53	52	52	54	55	48	53
Source 1: NIWA
Source 2: Weather Spark

== Economy ==
Farming, sawmilling, limestone quarrying and tourism are major local industries. The area around Tākaka is mineral-rich, with gold, iron ore, copper, silver and asbestos all found locally, although not all in commercially viable amounts.

=== Dairy factory ===
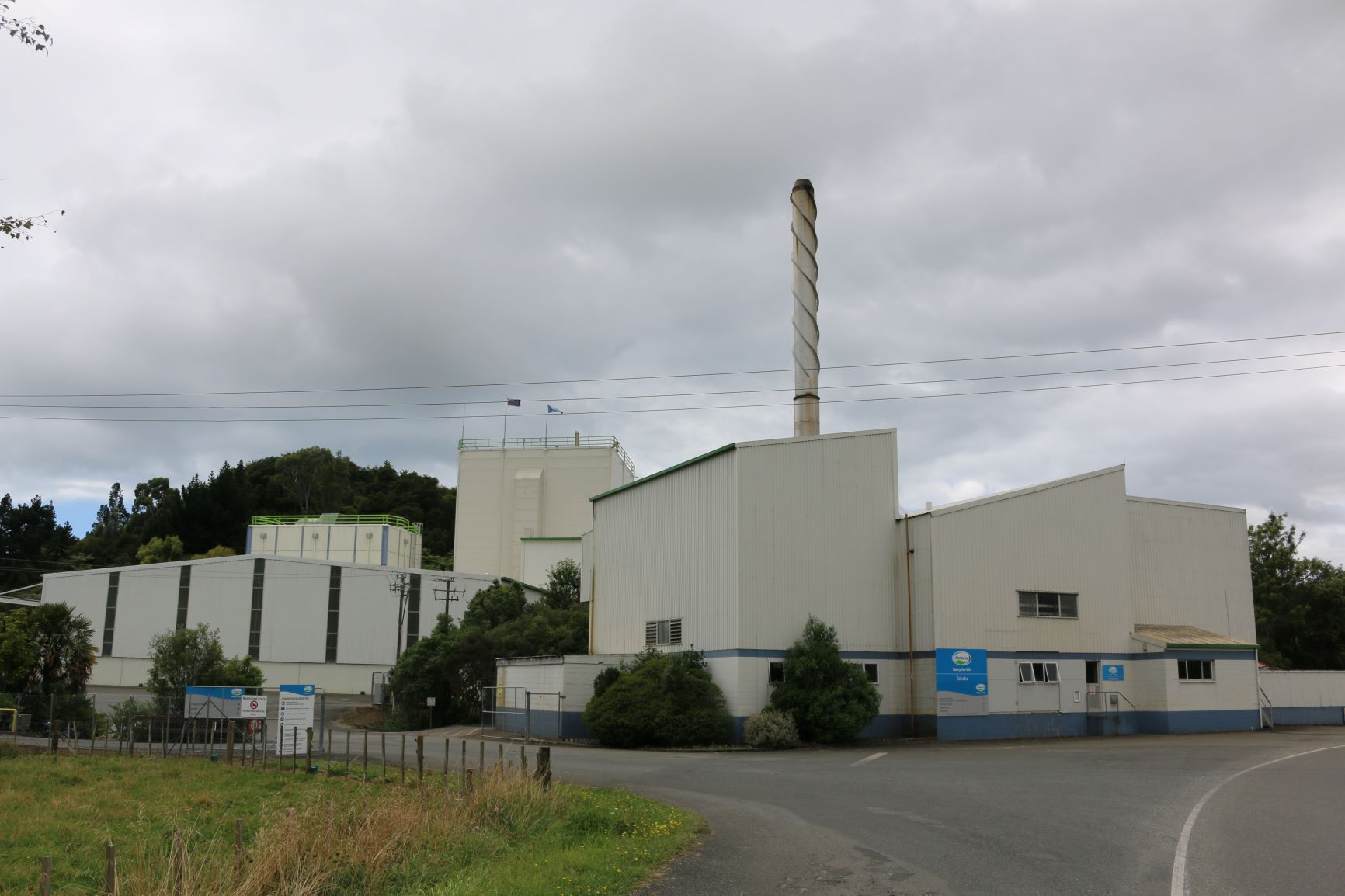
Fonterra dairy factory in Tākaka (2021)

There is also a small Fonterra factory located in the township of Tākaka that produces skim milk powder. There are 83 dairy farms supplying the factory, which can process about 525,000 litres (139,000 US gal) a day into skim milk powder. Cream is produced as a by-product, and is shipped to the Clandeboye factory for further processing. The $80 million Takaka dairy factory was damaged by a fire in 2005. More than 60 firefighters battled the fire, which was caused by contractors completing welding work. It has subsequently been rebuilt. In 2009, it was reported that it employed nearly 50 staff and contributed $3 million in wages to the local economy.

== Demographics ==
Stats NZ describes Tākaka as a small urban area, which covers 12.52 km^{2} (4.83 sq mi). It had an estimated population of 1,440 as of June 2025, with a population density of 115 people per km^{2}.

Historical population
Year	Pop.	±% p.a.
2006	1,152	—
2013	1,236	+1.01%
2018	1,335	+1.55%
2023	1,392	+0.84%

Tākaka had a population of 1,392 in the 2023 New Zealand census, an increase of 57 people (4.3%) since the 2018 census, and an increase of 156 people (12.6%) since the 2013 census. There were 675 males, 711 females, and 3 people of other genders in 576 dwellings. 3.7% of people identified as LGBTIQ+. The median age was 47.1 years (compared with 38.1 years nationally). There were 237 people (17.0%) aged under 15 years, 168 (12.1%) aged 15 to 29, 630 (45.3%) aged 30 to 64, and 354 (25.4%) aged 65 or older.

People could identify as more than one ethnicity. The results were 93.3% European (Pākehā); 10.3% Māori; 1.5% Pasifika; 3.4% Asian; 0.9% Middle Eastern, Latin American and African New Zealanders (MELAA); and 3.2% other, which includes people giving their ethnicity as "New Zealander". English was spoken by 97.6%, Māori by 2.8%, Samoan by 0.4%, and other languages by 9.1%. No language could be spoken by 1.7% (e.g. too young to talk). New Zealand Sign Language was known by 0.6%. The percentage of people born overseas was 19.4, compared with 28.8% nationally.

Religious affiliations were 20.0% Christian, 0.2% Hindu, 0.2% Māori religious beliefs, 0.9% Buddhist, 0.9% New Age, and 1.1% other religions. People who answered that they had no religion were 70.9%, and 5.6% of people did not answer the census question.

Of those at least 15 years old, 207 (17.9%) people had a bachelor's or higher degree, 651 (56.4%) had a post-high school certificate or diploma, and 297 (25.7%) people exclusively held high school qualifications. The median income was $30,400, compared with $41,500 nationally. 45 people (3.9%) earned over $100,000 compared to 12.1% nationally. The employment status of those at least 15 was 471 (40.8%) full-time, 231 (20.0%) part-time, and 21 (1.8%) unemployed.

== Water supply and fire fighting ==
As of 2025 there is no reticulated drinking water supply to the town. The properties in the town rely on private domestic bores that are typically between 5–8 m (16–26 ft) deep and draw water from the Tākaka Unconfined Gravel Aquifer using surface pumps. Early in 2011, the Tasman District Council consulted with the local community about a proposal to construct a reticulated water supply for the town. The water for the proposed system would be drawn from a deep bore into the aquifer, and given ultraviolet treatment. The indicative cost to the community for the reticulated water supply was stated as $525 per annum for each rateable residential property, over a period of 20 years. This proposal followed earlier similar proposals that were not supported by the community, and it did not proceed.

However, this left unresolved an existing problem with inadequate water supplies for fire-fighting in the town. Water for fire fighting had previously been drawn from numerous wells around the town but many problems had been experienced including inoperability, inadequate flow, damage to bores from vandalism, and the risks to fire appliances from gravel entrained in some of the wells. A new fire fighting water supply was built and commissioned in July 2011. The scheme includes a new 300 mm (12 in) diameter bore to supplement the existing 250 mm (9.8 in) diameter bore at the Tākaka Fire Station, along with a new 150 mm (5.9 in) bore as a monitoring well. The new 300 mm diameter bore was designed to be suitable for supply of potable water as a future-proofing measure. This required that the screen for the bore was below 30 m (98 ft) depth, to meet requirements for classification as a "secure" supply for drinking water. A 1.74 km (1.08 mi) long fire main was installed through the centre of Tākaka, supplying 16 fire hydrants.

In January 2024, testing of water samples from three bores in the town indicated contamination that was believed to be linked to run–off from fire fighting at a building supplies store that was destroyed by fire earlier in the month.

== Education ==
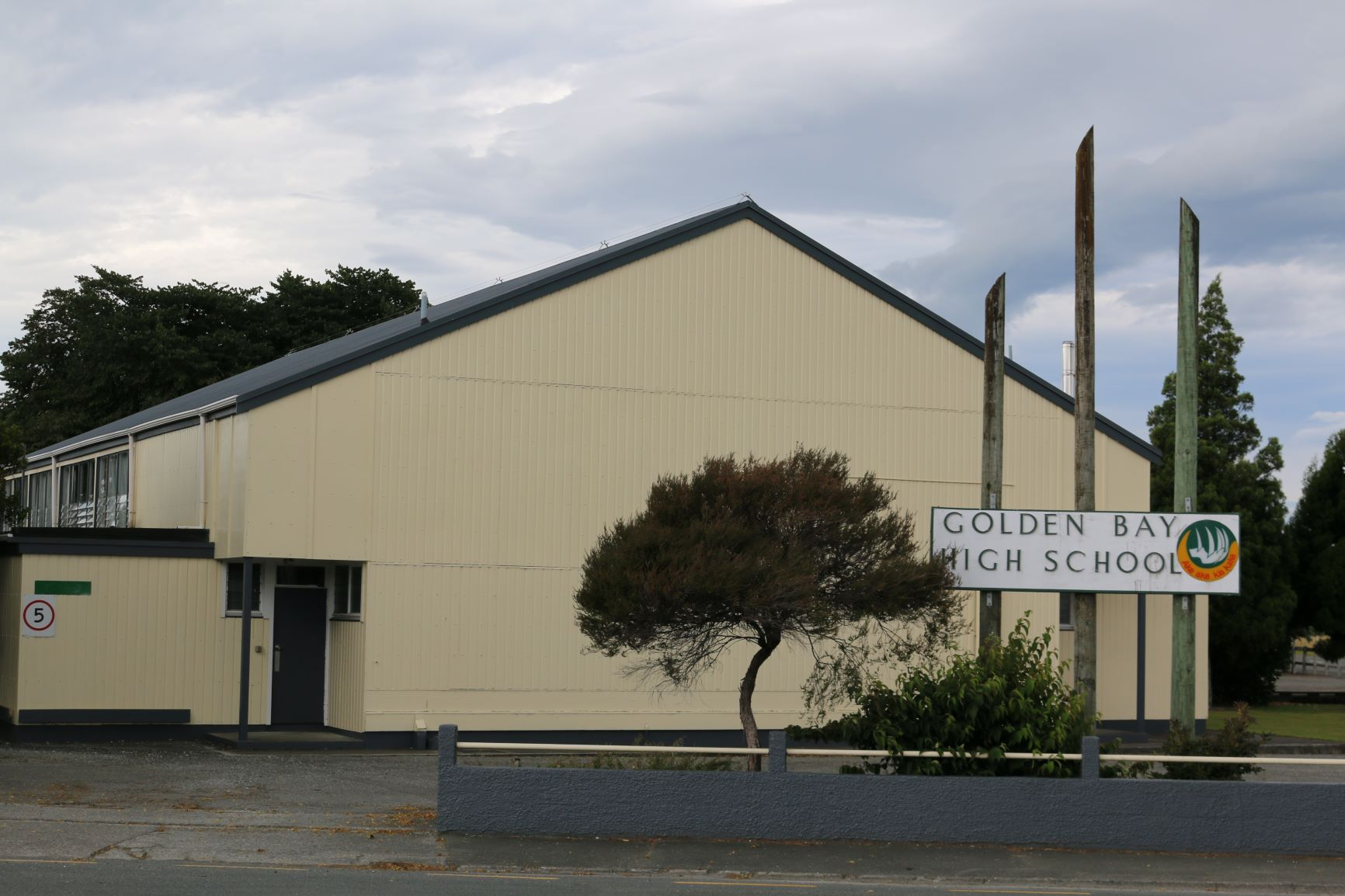
Golden Bay High School (2021)

Te Kura Tuarua o Mohua Golden Bay High School is a co-educational state intermediate and high school for Year 7 to 13 students, with a roll of 300 as of July 2026. It opened in 1862 as Takaka District High School. Much of the school was rebuilt between 2018 and 2023.

There are two primary schools for Year 1 to 6 students:

- Tākaka Primary School, with a roll of 127. A Takaka School advertised for a teacher in 1864.
- Central Tākaka School with a roll of 39. It opened in 1896.

Other schools in the area were Lower Takaka School (1860–1949), East Takaka School (1874–1968), Upper Takaka School (1883–1990), West Takaka School (1887–?), Uruwhenua School (1906–1932) and Takaka Hill School (1930–?).

There is also a primary school in nearby Motupipi.

== Features ==
=== Golden Bay Museum – Te Waka Huia o Mohua ===
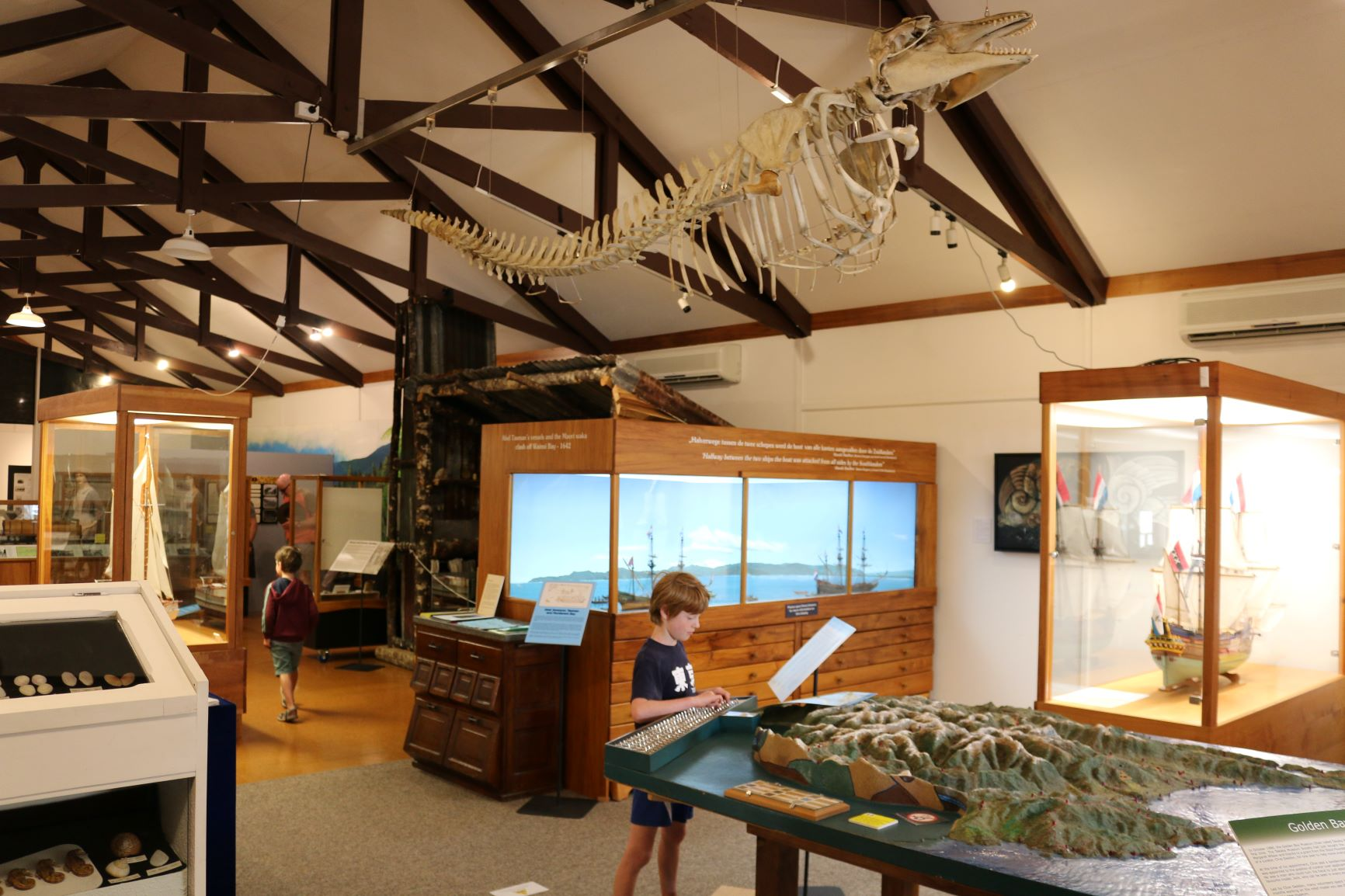
Interior photo of the Golden Bay Museum (2021)

The Golden Bay Museum – Te Waka Huia o Mohua has displays on Abel Tasman's 1642 encounter with Ngāti Tūmatakōkiri (the local Māori tribe), Golden Bay's industrial past, a pilot whale skeleton, and twice yearly changing temporary exhibitions. It opened in 1990 after a fundraising effort by the community purchased the collections of the privately owned Takaka Museum. The current museum is operated by the Golden Bay Museum Society Incorporated, and receives some funding from Tasman District Council.

=== Labyrinth Rocks Park ===
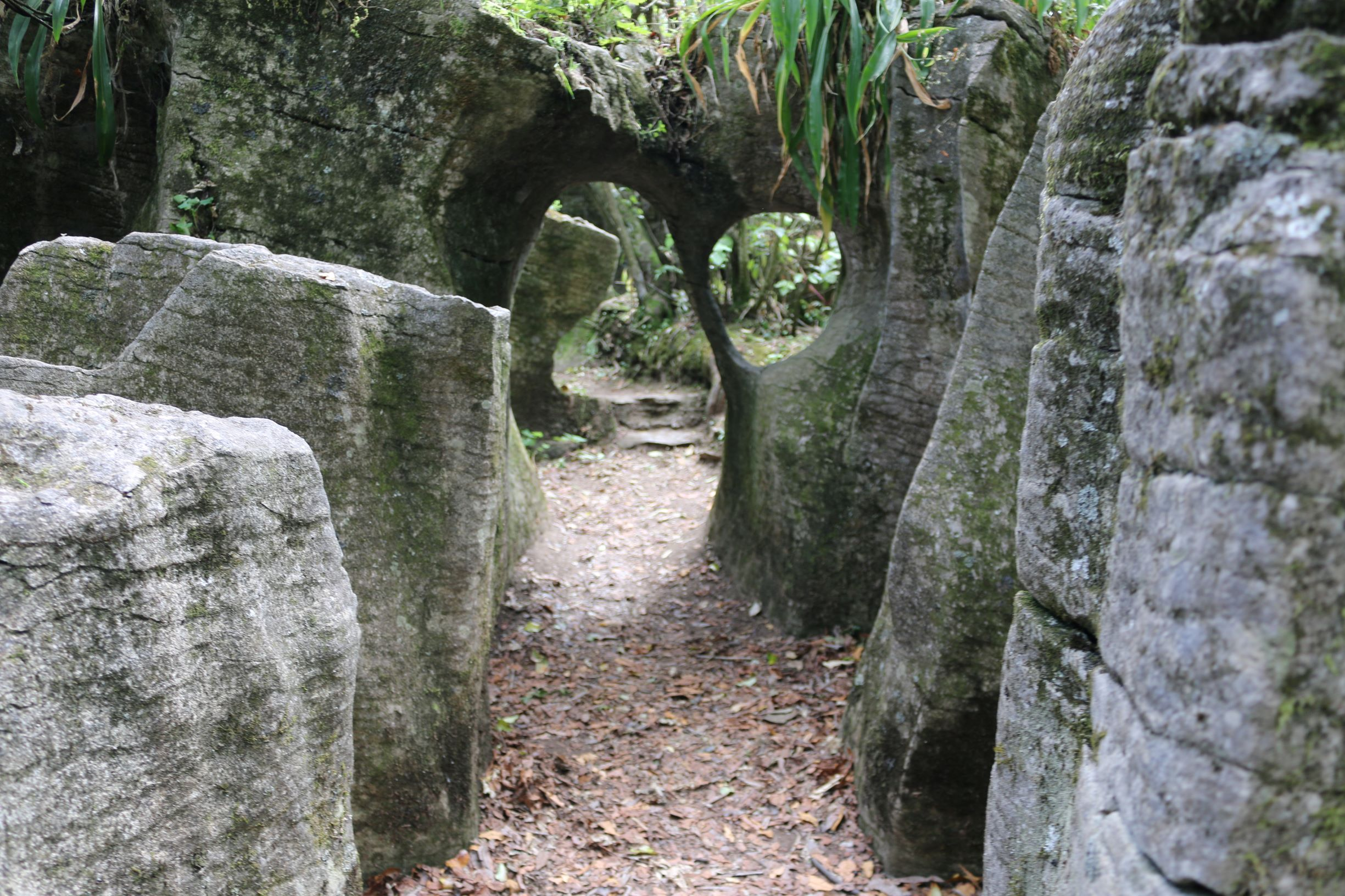
Limestone archway in the Labyrinth Rocks Park, Tākaka (2021)

The Labyrinth Rocks Park is located on Scott Road. It is a two-hectare (4.9-acre) natural rock maze. Shaped by the chemistry of rainfall and rock, it is a part of the Takaka Hill karst landscape of sculptured rocks, corrugated walls and vertical clefts. Narrow passages lead to small groves of native bush or to another passage or to a dead end, but the maze is too small to get lost in. Doll figurines and toy dinosaurs poked into crevices add to the labyrinth's fairytale Jurassic Park experience. Founded by an English geologist, Dave Whittaker, it is now a public reserve. Entrance is free.

=== Paines Ford swimming hole and rock climbing ===
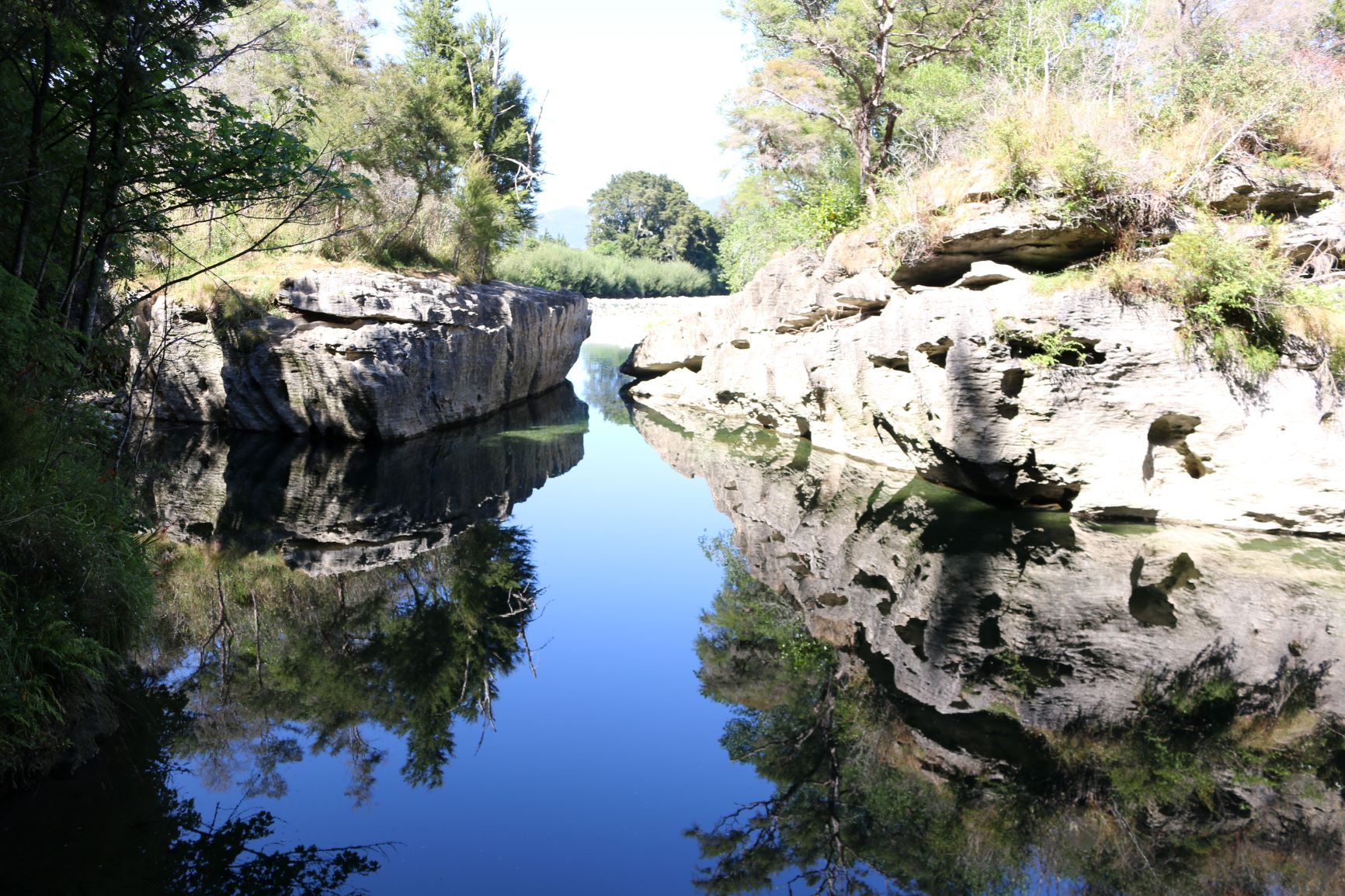
The still water of one of the swimming holes at Paines Ford

Paines Ford (also known as Paynes Ford) is a swimming hole and rock climbing spot on the confluence of the Waingara and Takaka rivers. An easy trail from the carpark follows the route of a tramline, that existed to haul timber out of the surrounding forest in the early 1880s, to a number of swimming holes surrounded by limestone rock formations. The entrance and carpark is located at 1886 Takaka Valley, Highway SH60, which is 3 kilometres (1.9 mi) south of central Takaka. Alternatively, it is about a 20 minutes walk from Tākaka. Paines Ford has over 200 bolted climbs. The most famous climb is 1080 and the letter G because of its unique "no-hands-rest" at the top and its views of Golden Bay.

== Notable buildings ==
=== Masonic lodge ===
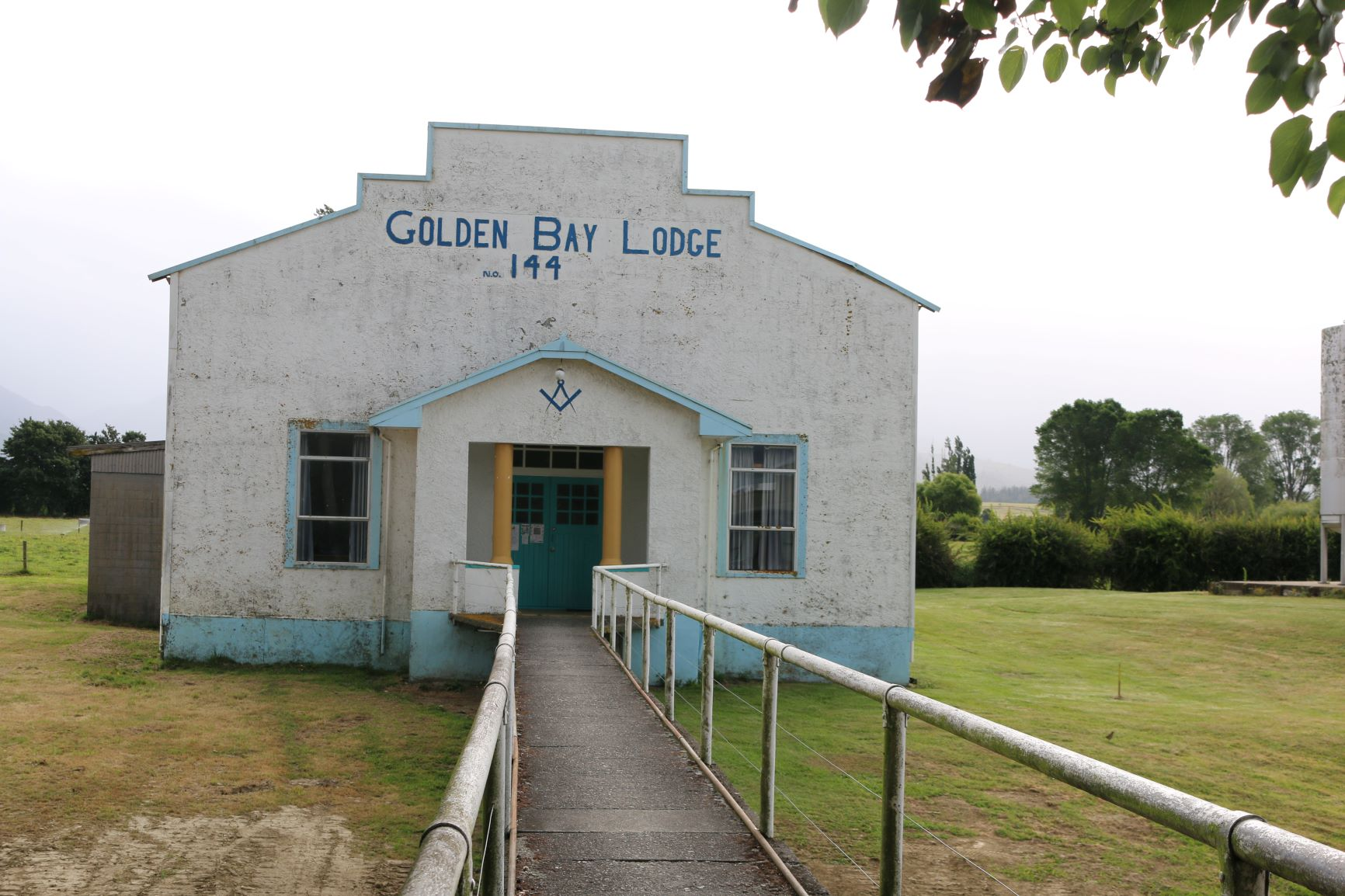
Golden Bay Masonic Lodge 144 (2021)

The Masonic lodge was originally built as a cinema in 1926 outside the town boundary, as for reasons unknown, a cinema was not permitted in the town. It was a popular addition to the town before being sold in 1937 and became the Masonic lodge. The Collingwood Lodge and the Takaka Lodge merged in 1972 became the Golden Bay Lodge No 144.

=== Golden Bay theatre ===
The Golden Bay theatre was opened in May 1927. Electricity became available in 1929 with a petrol engine used prior to this to provide power. When television arrived, theatre numbers declined and it was used for other public functions. In 1978 it was converted into a cafe and art gallery.

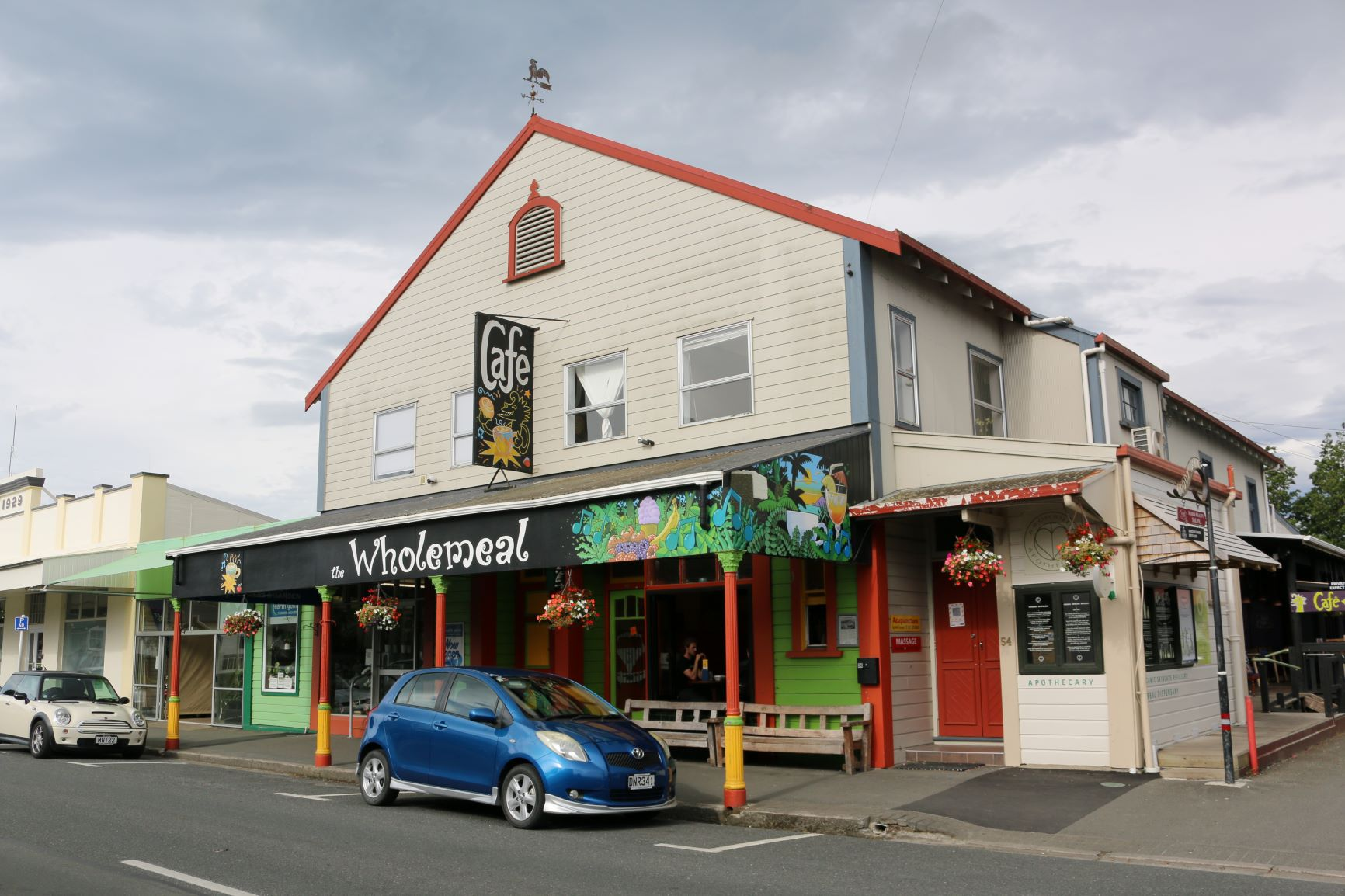
The Golden Bay theatre, now a cafe (2021)

=== Bank of New Zealand ===
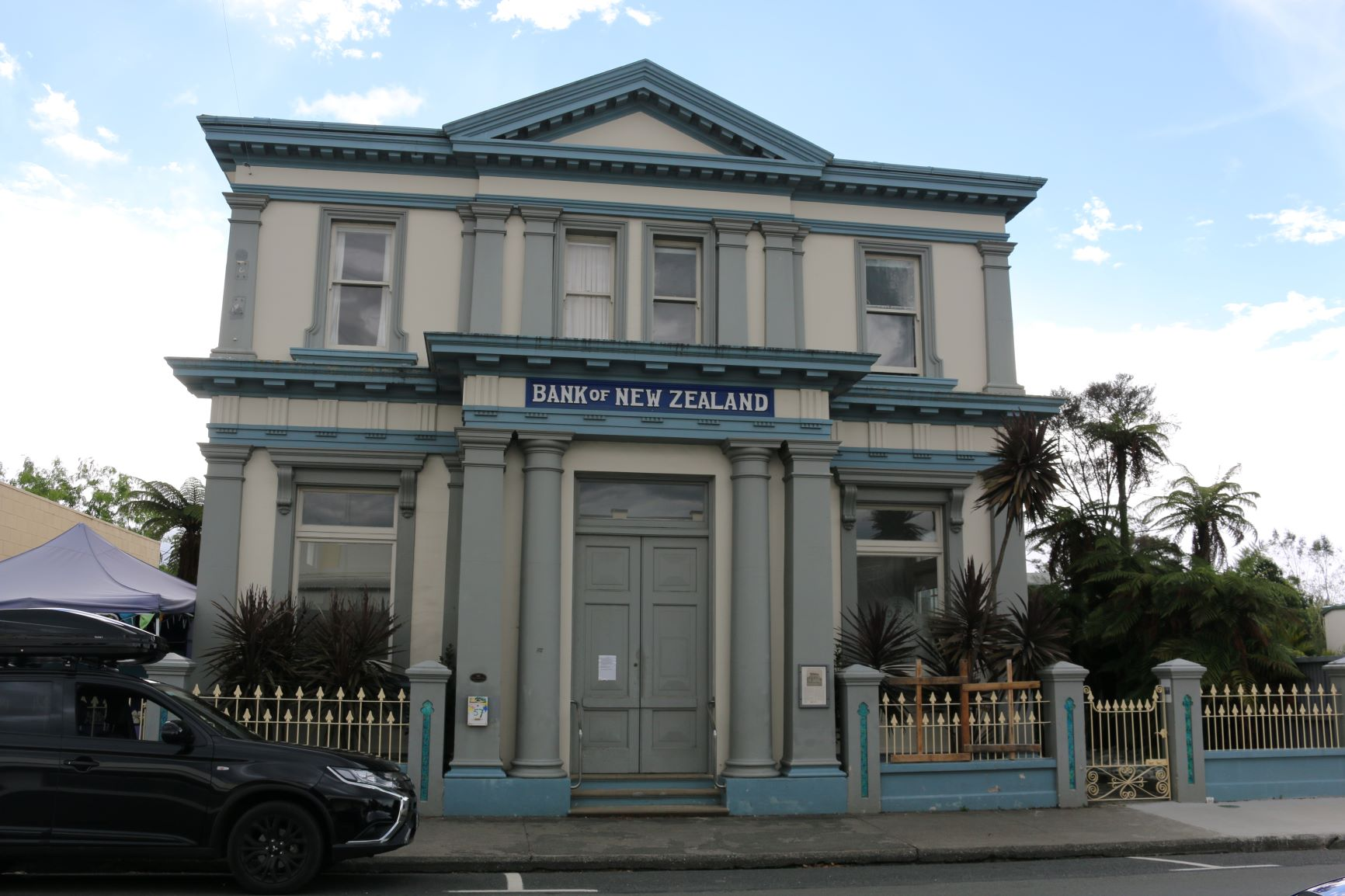
Bank of New Zealand building, Tākaka (2021)

The Bank of New Zealand first engaged in business in Tākaka in 1884 based in a local hotel. The bank moved into the premises pictured in 1915. The building was built out of reinforced concrete supplied by the Golden Bay Cement Company. Gas lighting was initially used and this was replaced with electric lighting in 1930. The bank survived the Murchison earthquake of 1929 without any structural damage. In 1983 floods entered the bank but did little damage. The building is currently used as an art gallery.

=== Golden Bay Electricity Board building ===
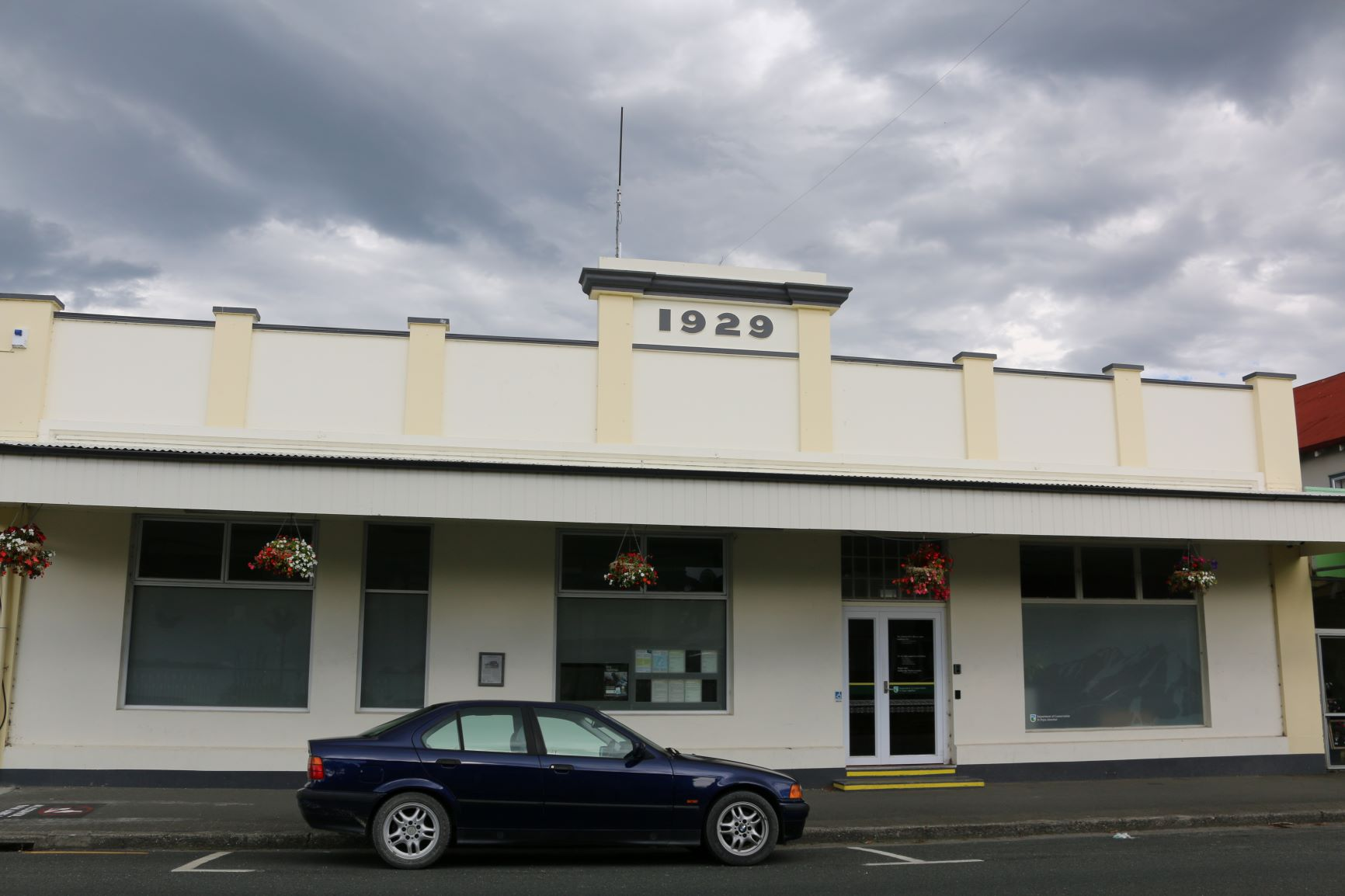
Golden Bay Electricity Board building (2021)

On this site in Commercial Street was originally a blacksmith. In 1929, the Golden Bay Electricity Board opened the building and occupied it until 2000. It is now occupied by the Department of Conservation.

=== Telegraph Hotel ===
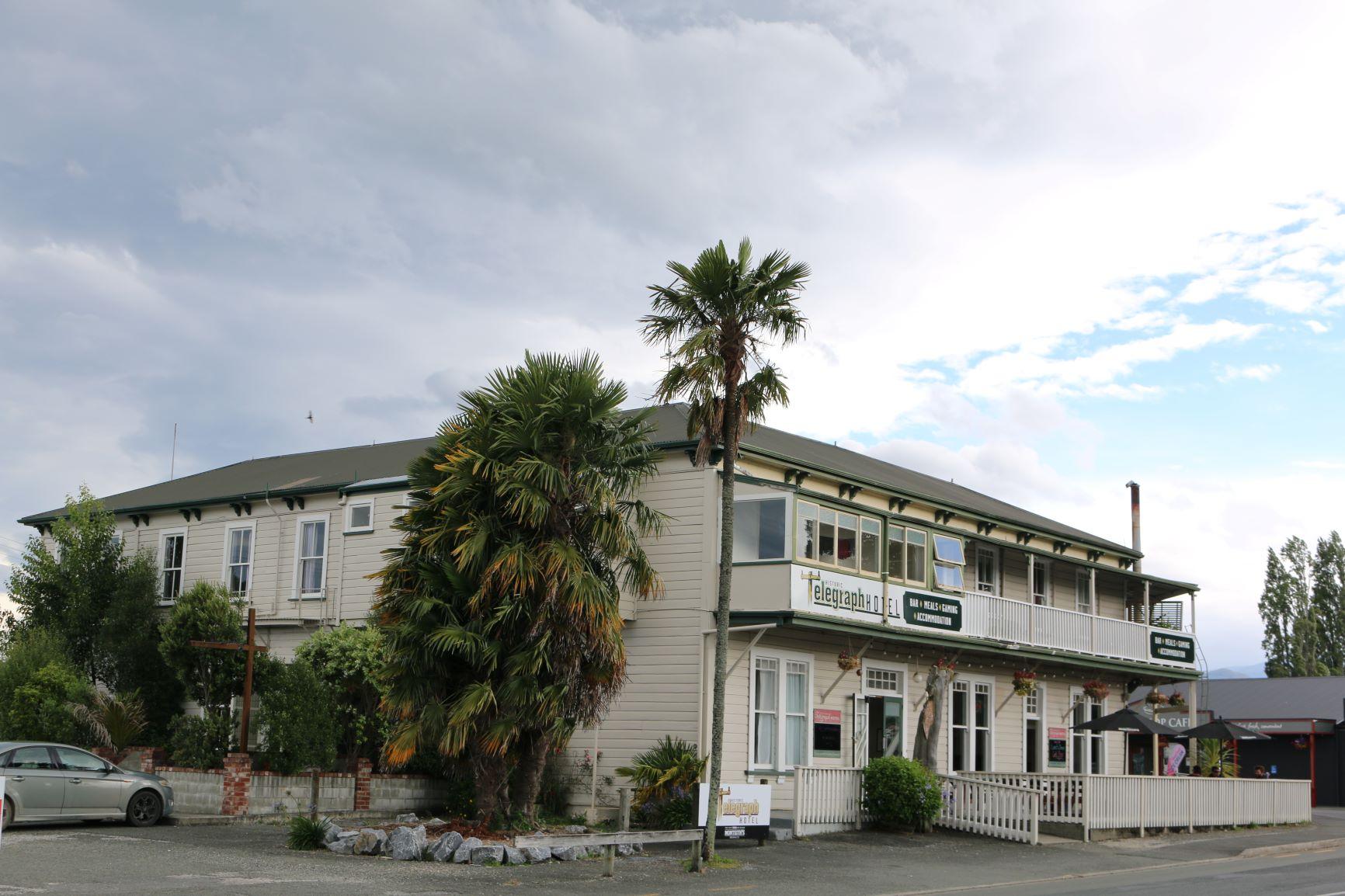
Telegraph Hotel, Tākaka (2021)

The Telegraph Hotel was built over 100 years ago.

=== Church of the Epiphany ===
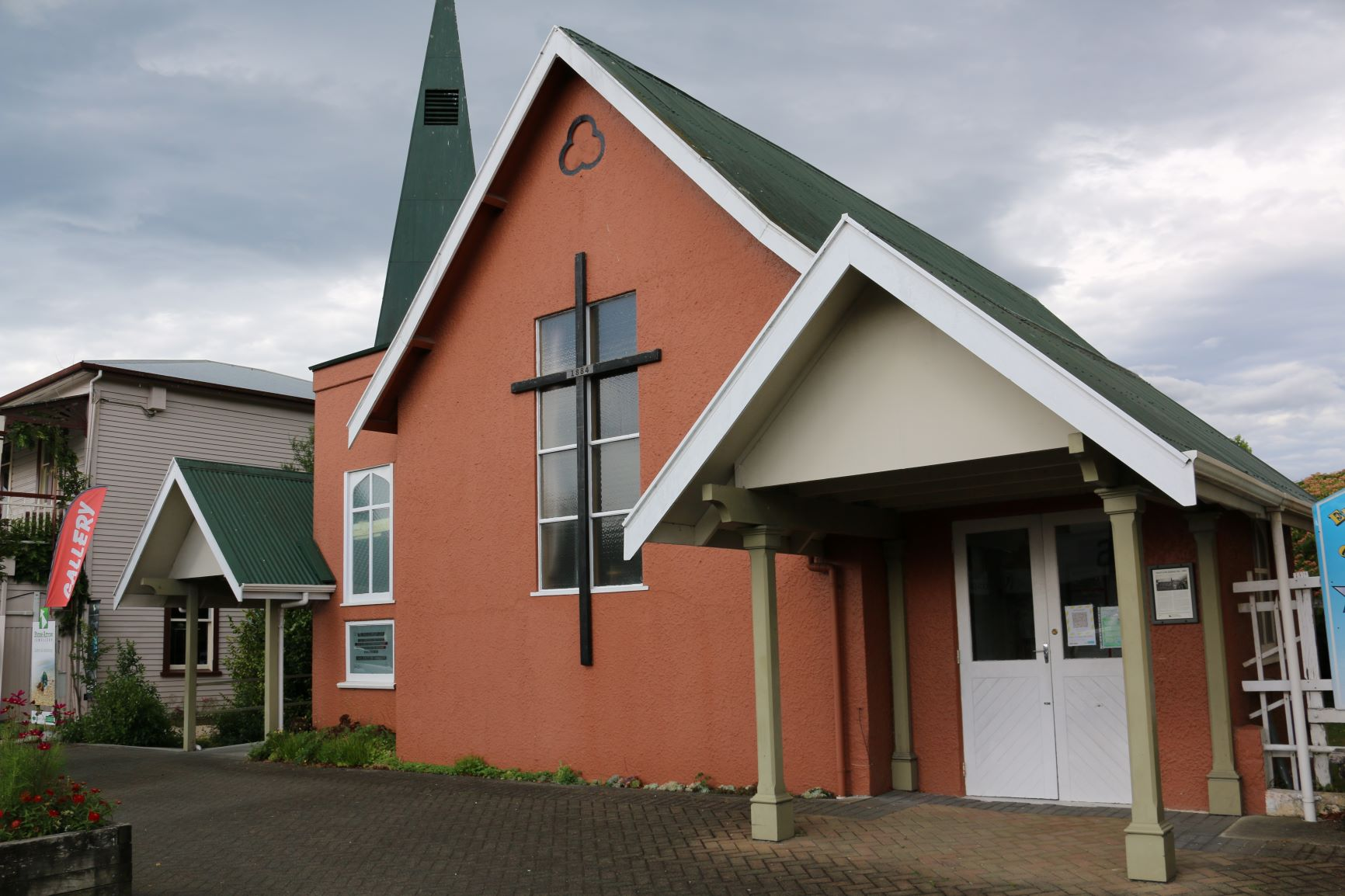
Church of the Epiphany, Tākaka (2021)

The Anglican church of the Epiphany is situated on Commercial Street. It was consecrated by the Bishop of Nelson in 1884. It was built from locally sawn mataī and tōtara timber. A bell tower was added in 1900 and by 1960 the timber was covered in stucco. The bell tower was replaced in 1966 and the church was extended in 2002.

=== Sacred Heart Catholic Church ===
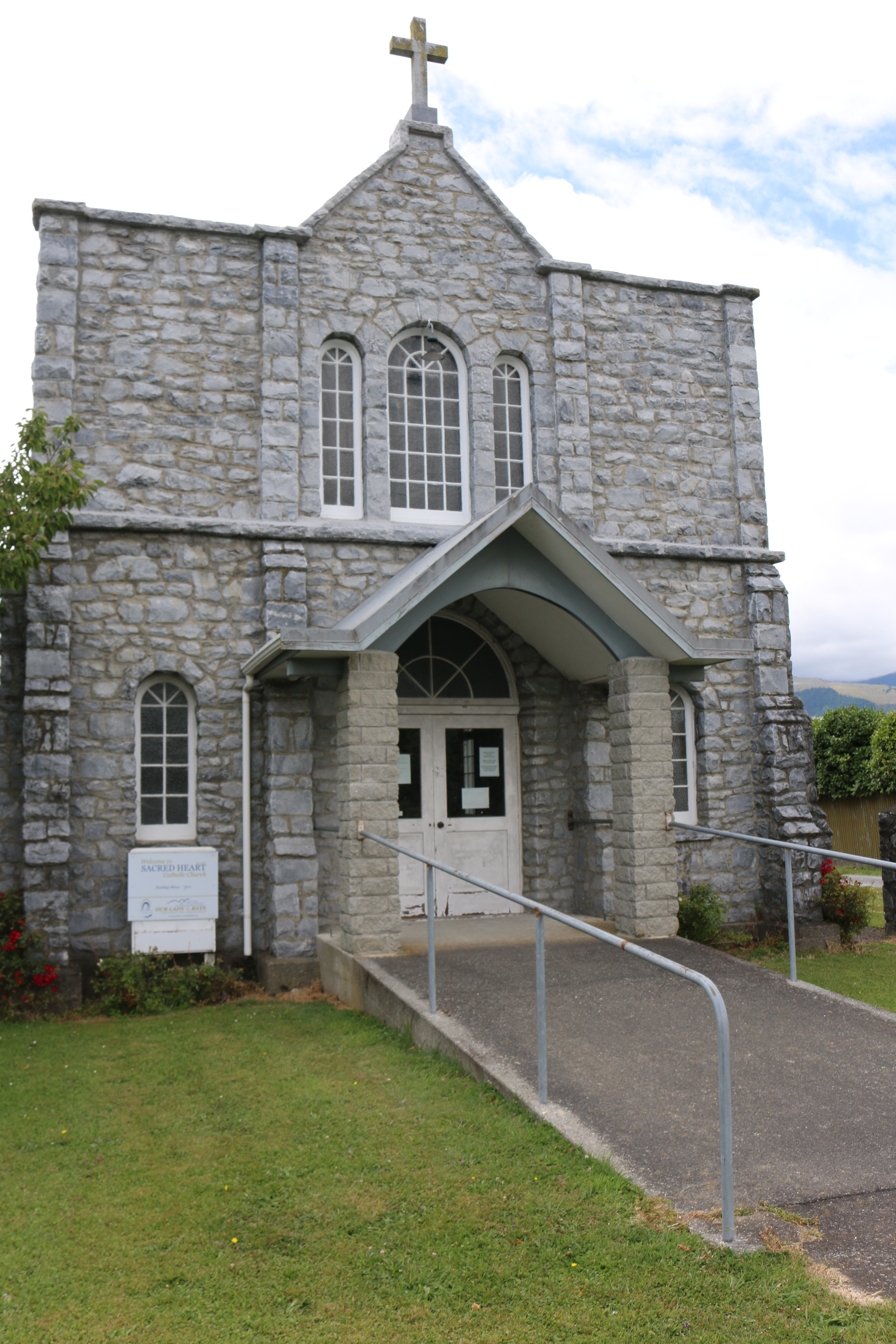
The Church of the Sacred Heart, Tākaka (2021)

The Church of the Sacred Heart was designed by Nelson architect Arthur Griffin, and built at a cost of £1250 using locally sourced marble. It was formally opened on 15 September 1918. The church requires structural strengthening to bring it up to the building code requirements and has not been used since 2011.

=== St Andrew's Presbyterian Church ===
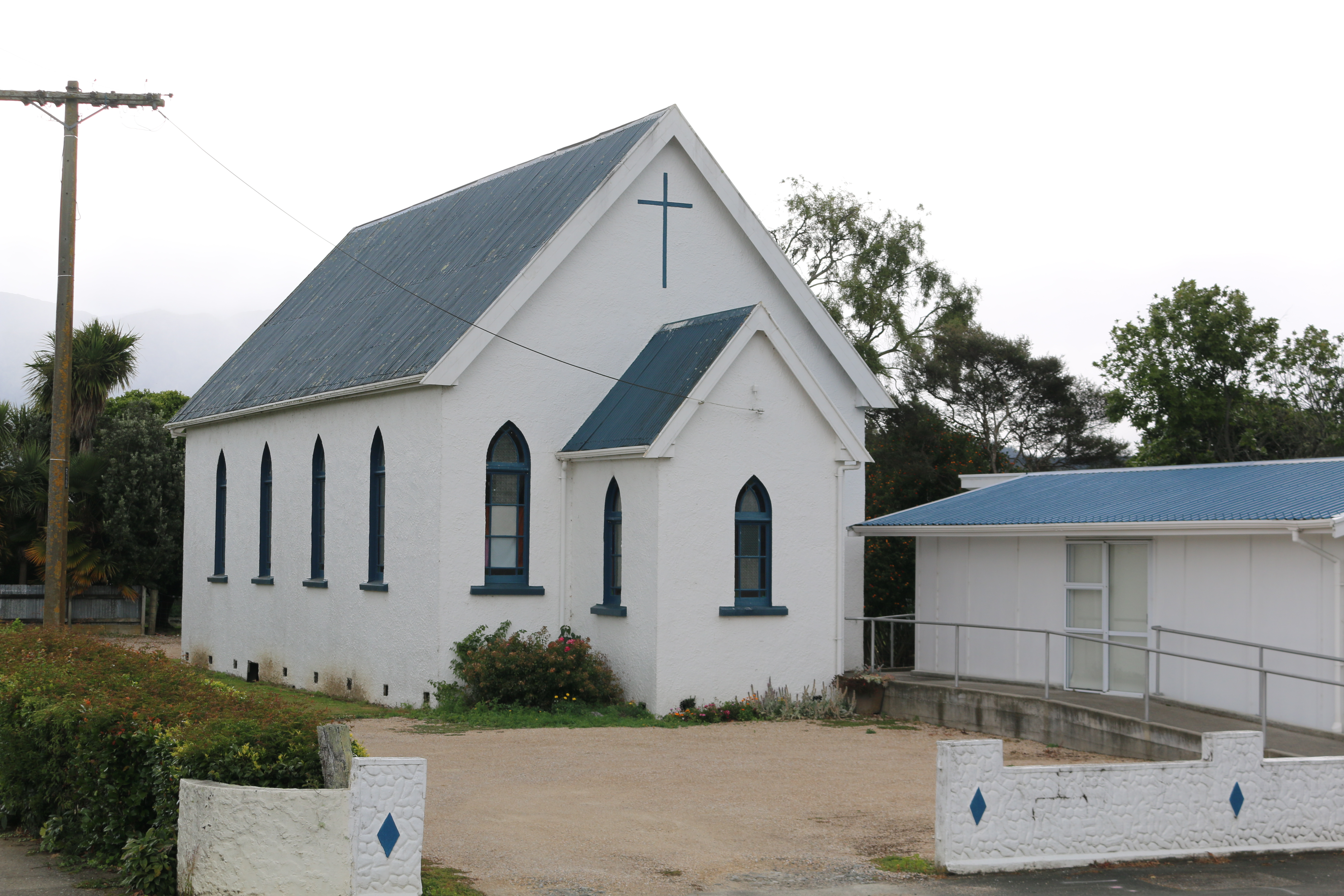
St Andrews Presbyterian Church, Tākaka (2021)

St Andrew's is located on Commercial Street, Tākaka.

=== Eureka boarding house ===
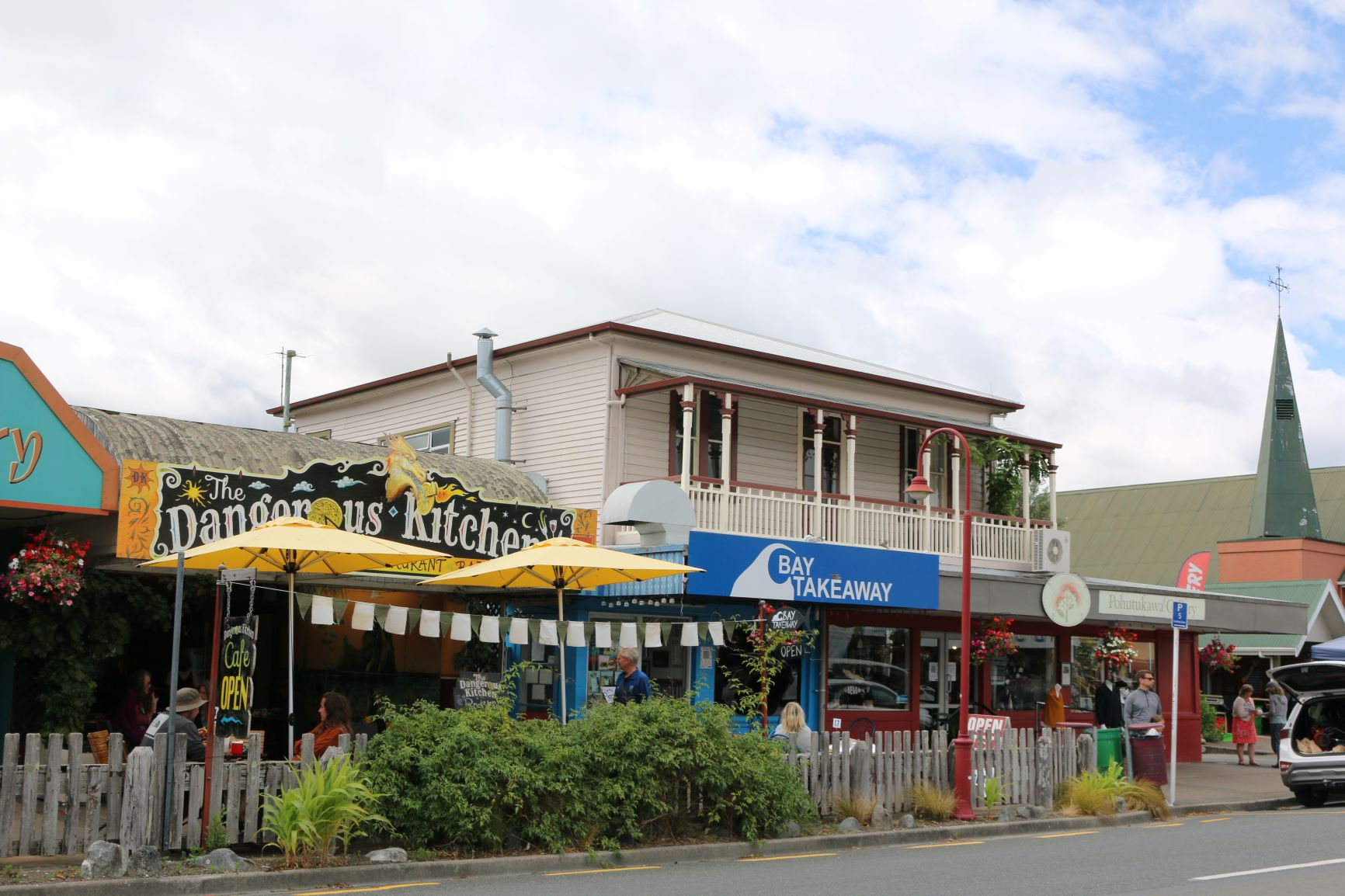
Eureka Boarding House, Takaka (2021)

The Eureka boarding house was built in 1906. A milk bar was added to the front of the building in the 1950s. It has since been modified further to provide more shop frontage.

== Golf course ==
The Takaka Golf Club had a number of homes on local farms before shifting to Crown land at Clifton that was able to be rented for a token amount in perpetuity in 1959.
