= Tākaka River =

River in New Zealand

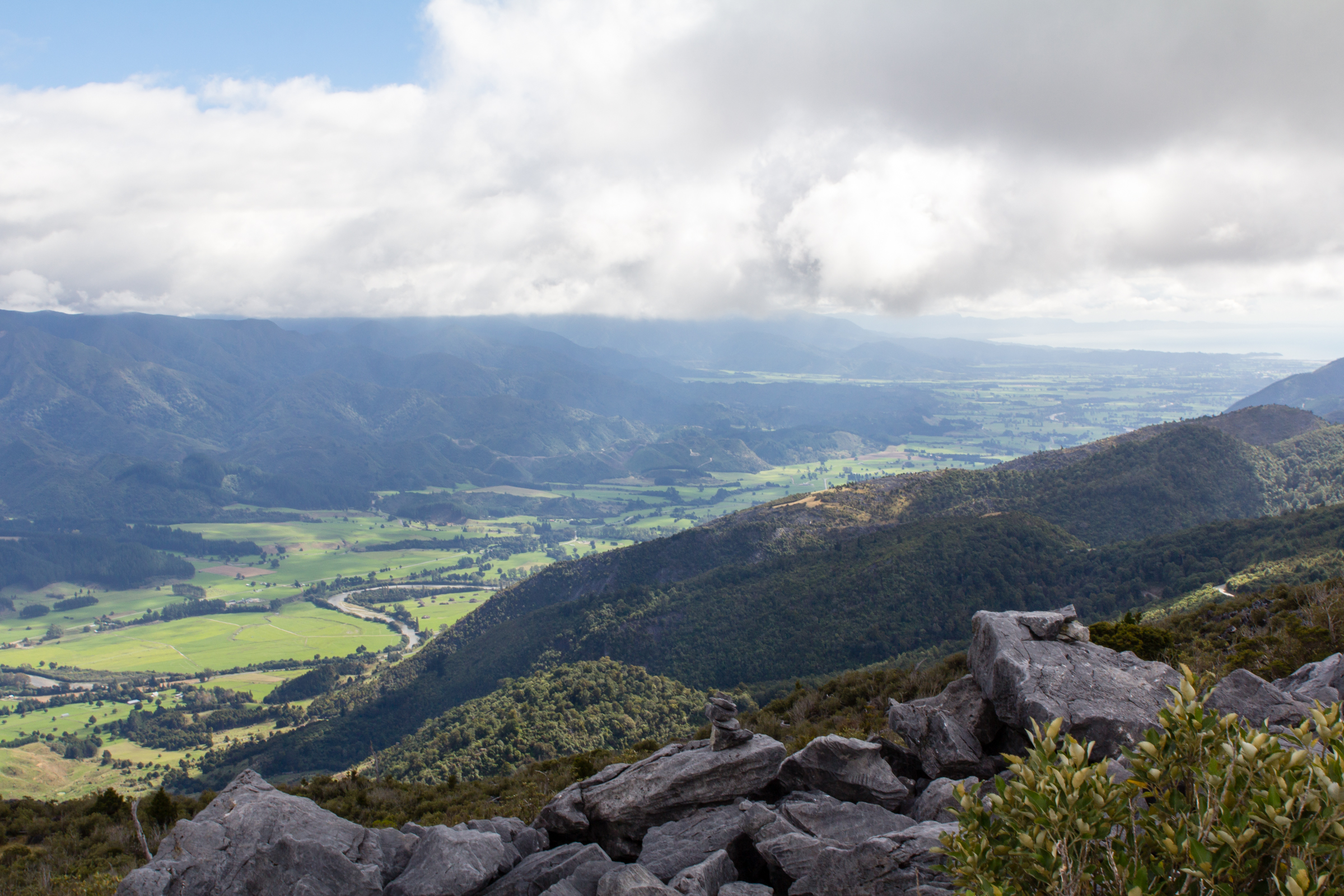
- View of the Tākaka River valley from Tākaka Hill

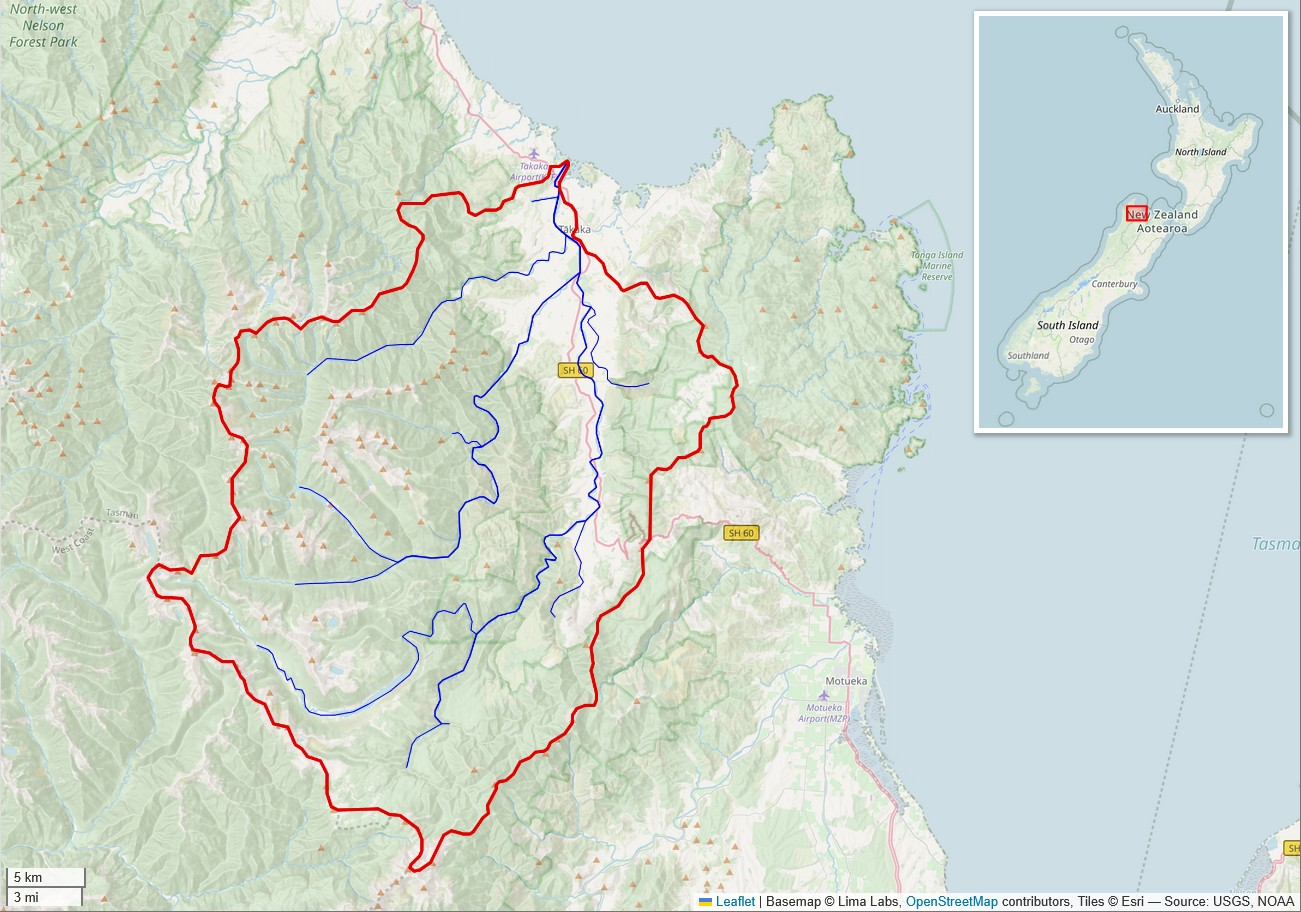
- Tākaka River basin (Interactive map)

Location
- Country: New Zealand

Physical characteristics
- Source
  - location: Junction of Balloon Creek and Flora Stream
  - coordinates: 41°09′45″S 172°40′52″E
- Mouth
  - location: Golden Bay / Mohua
  - coordinates: 40°52′56″S 172°48′37″E

Basin features
- Progression: Tākaka River → Golden Bay / Mohua → Tasman Sea
- Tributaries
  - left: Deep Creek, Peat Creek, Bullock Creek, Camp Creek, Asbestos Creek, Gabbro Creek, Cobb River, Sams Creek, Rheumatic Creek, Kill Devil Creek, Sam Creek, Cotton Creek, Craigieburn Creek, Washaway Creek, Stony Creek, Spring Brook, Waingaro River, Anatoki River, One Spec Creek, Te Waikoropupū River
  - right: Grecian Creek, Barron Stream, Waitui Stream, Aaron Creek, Ironstone Creek, Scott Creek, The Gorge Creek, Rāmeka Creek
- Bridges: Lindsays Bridge

The Tākaka River lies in the northwest of New Zealand's South Island. It runs north for 70 kilometres, entering Golden Bay near the town of Tākaka.

== Naming ==
Manawhenua Ki Mohua, an iwi-mandated organisation representing Ngāti Tama, Ngāti Rārua, and Te Āti Awa within Golden Bay / Mohua, and staff from the Tākaka Memorial Library, completed a research project in 2023 confirming the origin of many local Māori place names. They reported that Tākaka was a place name brought out from Tahiti in the 13th century, with an original spelling of Tā'a'a.

The previous explanation of the name was given in the 2010 edition of Place Names of New Zealand as such:

Literally bracken (Pteris esculentum). Either transferred from the Polynesian place name of Tahaʻa, the island next to Raʻiātea, or short for Te Toka-o-Tākaka, 'the stone of Tākaka'. Tākaka was a slave aboard the Kurahaupō canoe who was turned to stone when he searched for greenstone because such work was tapu.

== Geography ==
The Tākaka River originates in Kahurangi National Park on the northern side of the Wharepapa / Arthur Range. It is formed by the confluence of Balloon Creek, which flows from the west, and Flora Stream, which joins it from the east-southeast. Flowing northward, the river flows for approximately 57 km (35 mi). About 4.3 km (2.7 mi) north of Tākaka, the river discharges into the bay (Golden Bay / Mohua) that has the same name as the land area, at the northwestern end of the South Island.

== History ==
It was reported on 17 January 2007 that the Tākaka River is one of a growing number of South Island rivers to have a confirmed case of the invasive river weed didymo.

In July 2020, the name of the river was officially gazetted as Tākaka River by the New Zealand Geographic Board.

== Gallery ==
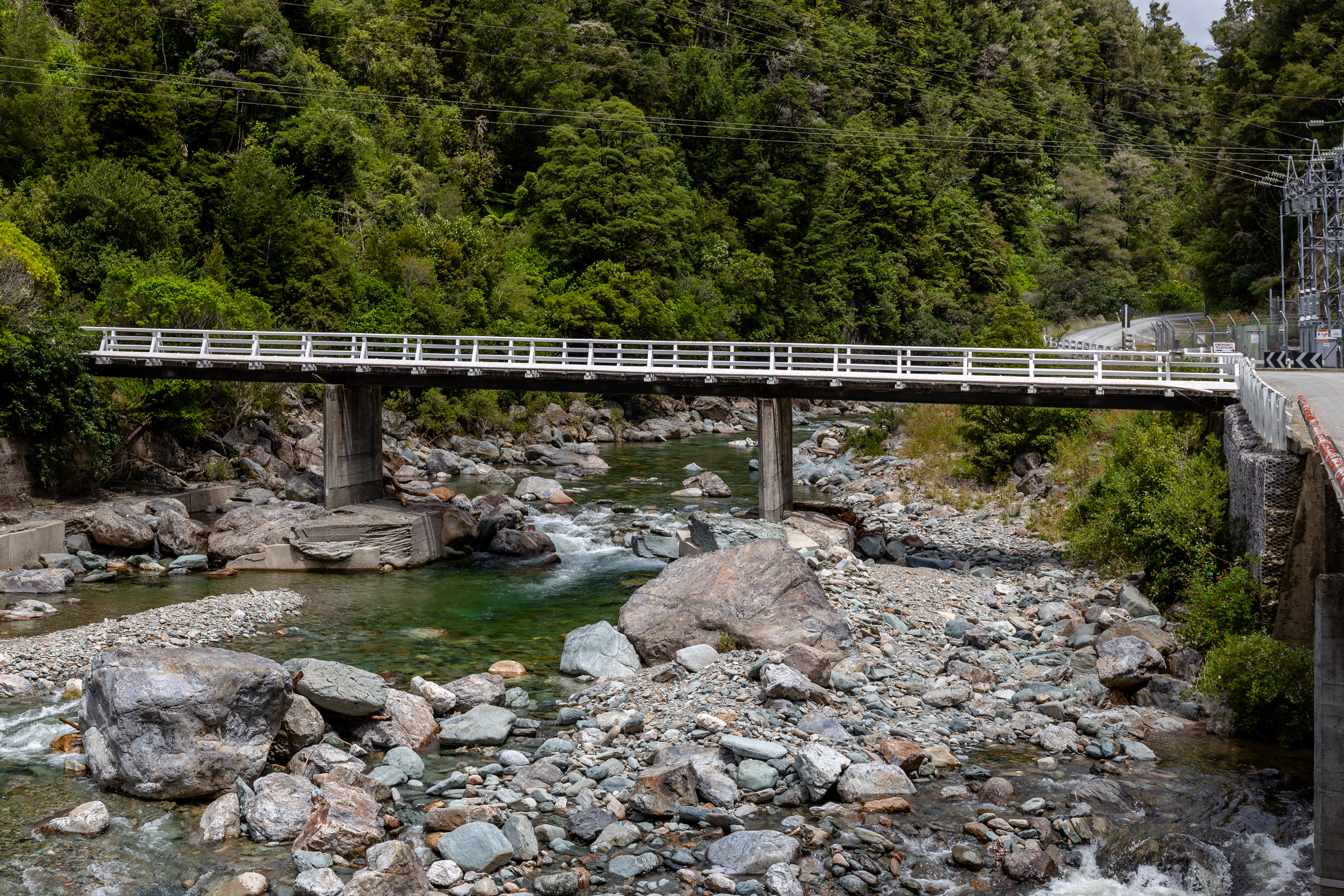
Bridge over Takaka River by Cobb Power Station, Kahurangi National Park, New Zealand

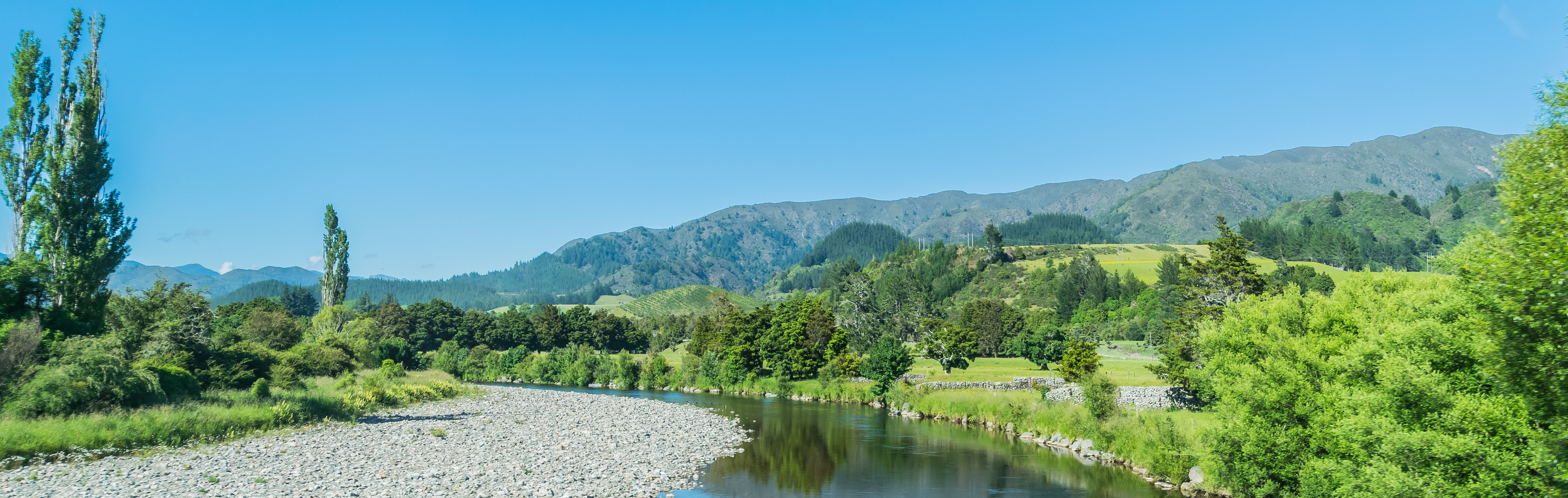
The Tākaka River seen from Lindsays Bridge

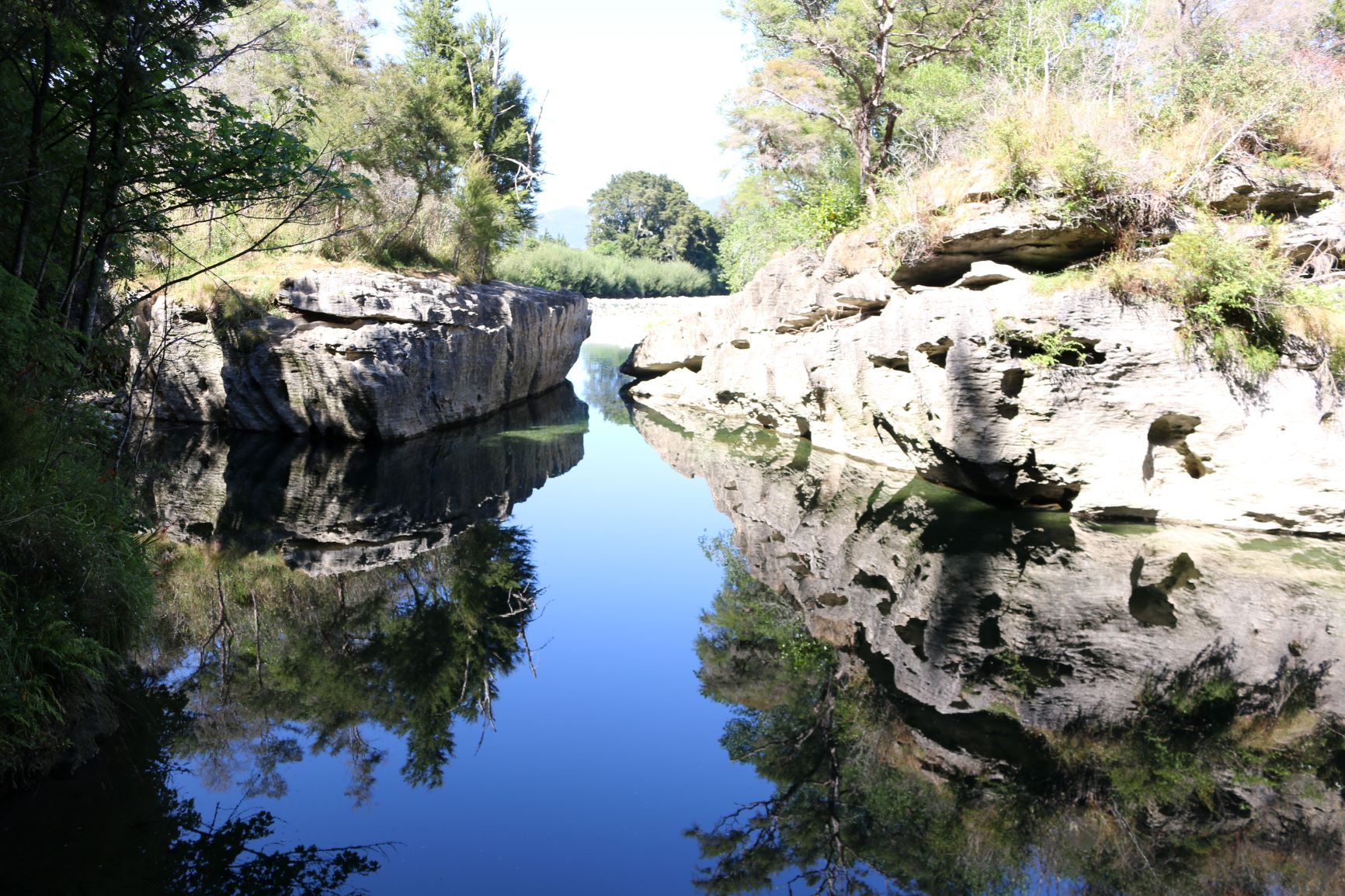
Tākaka River at Paines Ford, Tākaka
