= Kahurangi National Park =

National park in New Zealand

- IUCN category II (national park)
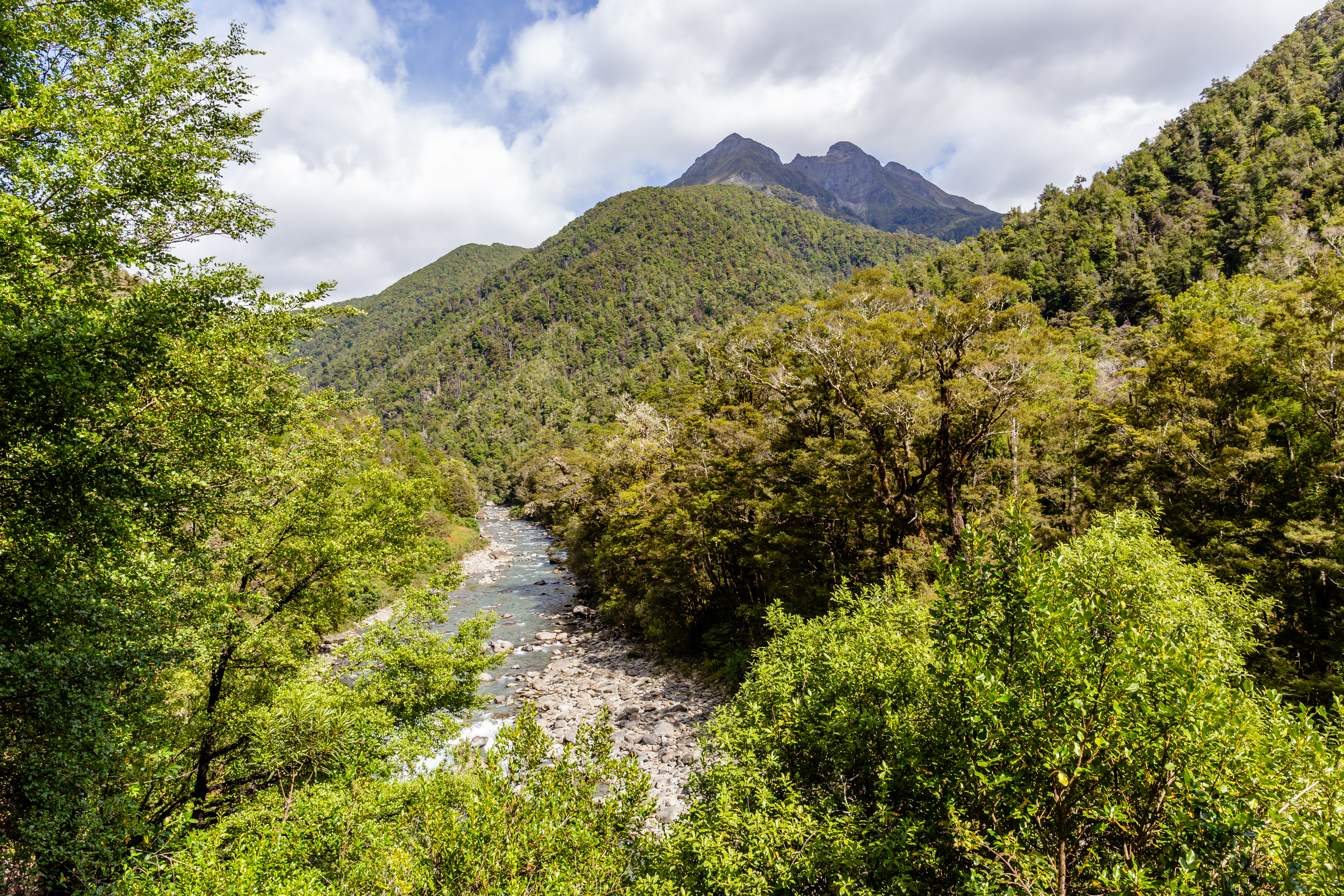
- View towards Mt Patriarch, Wangapeka Track
- Interactive map of Kahurangi National Park
- Nearest town: Tākaka
- Coordinates: 41.13°S 172.61°E
- Area: 5,193 km^{2} (2,005 sq mi)
- Established: 1996
- Governing body: Department of Conservation
- Website: www.doc.govt.nz/parks-and-recreation/places-to-go/nelson-tasman/places/kahurangi-national-park

Kahurangi National Park is a national park in the northwest of the South Island of New Zealand. It is the second largest of the thirteen national parks of New Zealand. It was gazetted in 1996 and covers 5,193 km^{2} (2,005 mi^{2}), ranging from the Buller River near Murchison in the south, to the base of Farewell Spit in Golden Bay in the north.

Its geology is complex, and is the most diverse of any of New Zealand's protected areas. It includes the best sequence of palaezoic rocks in the country. The park has no single dominant landform, but includes an unusually wide variety of landscapes, including mountain ranges, rivers, gorges, raised peneplains and karst features such as caves and arches. Many of the landforms within the park are considered to be nationally or internationally significant.

Kahurangi National Park also contains 80% of all New Zealand's alpine species. It also contains around 18 endemic bird species.

The park includes the Heaphy Track, a popular tramping and mountain biking track that is classified as one of New Zealand's Great Walks. Another multi-day tramping track in the park is the Wangapeka Track. In addition to tramping, rafting and caving are popular activities. Several locations in the national park were used during the making of The Lord of the Rings film series.

The park is managed by the Department of Conservation. Much of what was the North-west Nelson Forest Park formed the basis of the new park. Kahurangi Point, regarded as the boundary between the West Coast and Tasman Regions, is located in the park, as is Mount Owen.

== History ==
=== Use by Māori ===
There is archaeological evidence that Māori had settled the Kahurangi coastline from around 1380 CE, with pā sites on coastal ridges and evidence of more substantial habitation found around several of the river mouths and estuaries in the area.

The Anaweka waka found near the park's western boundary was built as early as 1226 CE, and was sailed as late as 1400 CE. It is one of only two-long distance voyaging canoes known to have survived to modern times, and was probably used for return journeys from New Zealand back to the Pacific. The mouth of the Anaweka River, where the waka was discovered, supported many settlements.

The area had an abundance of food resources, with middens from a site near the mouth of the Whakapoāi (Heaphy River) showing evidence of local Māori hunting bush moa, kekeno, and kurī. Excavation of the same site also demonstrated connections to trade routes running throughout New Zealand, with pounamu from the Arahura region and obsidian from Mayor Island / Tūhua in the Bay of Plenty both being used in the area. Māori interaction with the inland areas of the region was generally less common. Outside of frequently used trade routes connecting the top of the South Island to the West Coast, this was typically limited to seasonal hunting expeditions rather than the more permanent habitation along the coast.

For much of the region's history, Ngāti Tūmatakōkiri were mana whenua (held authority in) the region, having arrived in the early 1600s from the western North Island by way of the Marlborough Sounds and successfully displaced local Māori. This dominance of the region lasted for roughly 200 years, until other iwi began to encroach on the area in the early 1800s. Ngāti Tūmatakōkiri eventually succumbed to invasions by Ngāti Apa from the Kāpiti Coast to the northeast, Ngāti Kuia from the east, and Ngāi Tahu from the south, losing a decisive battle to the latter near Whanganui Inlet. Mana whenua status in the area was contested for much of the early 19th century, eventually settling with Te Atiawa o Te Waka-a-Māui, Ngāti Rārua and Ngāti Tama having authority in the Tasman region and Ngāi Tahu controlling from Kahurangi Point south.

=== Early Pākehā history ===
Early Europeans to visit the area were sealers. The seal colonies along the Kahurangi coast were almost exterminated within two decades. The establishment of the New Zealand Company's settlement at Nelson in 1841 led to exploitation of timber, flax and coal resources in the region.

One of the early European settlers to discover the Tableland in the Mount Arthur area was Thomas Salisbury. He wrote to The Colonist in 1863, claiming to have discovered gold in stream beds on the Tableland, and this led to a gold rush to the area. His brother John grazed sheep in the area from 1875.

The special character of flora and fauna in the region was recognised prior to 1920. One particular example is the Gouland Downs, an area with unusual geology and vegetation, situated at around 600 m (2,000 ft) elevation to the west of Mt Perry. The Gouland Downs was one of eleven sanctuaries designated by the Department of Internal Affairs in the year ending 31 March 1916. In 1918, the Department of Lands and Survey reported that 16,000 acres (6,500 ha) of Crown land, including the Gouland Downs, had been reserved under the Scenery Preservation Act 1903. The protected area was reported to be rare and valuable, and included the habitat of kākāpō, kiwi, weka, and other native birds.

In 1970, approximately 360,000 ha (890,000 acres) of land were gazetted as the North-west Nelson Forest Park as part of the amalgamation of eight forest parks in the region, under the management of the New Zealand Forest Service. At the time, many of the tracks in the park were overgrown. The Forest Service started on a programme of work to promote recreation in the park, including cutting new tracks and building huts.

=== Park establishment ===
An environmental lobby group, the Maruia Society, advocated for the establishment of a new national park in the area from the 1980s. In 1987, the management of the North West Nelson Forest Park was transferred to the newly formed Department of Conservation. The following year, an area of 86,946 ha (214,850 acres) within the Forest Park was designated as the Tasman Wilderness Area under the National Parks Act 1980 section 14, as an important step towards the formation of a new national park.

Although the area does not have the iconic geographic features of previously established New Zealand national parks, at the time of its creation there was increasing interest in protecting biodiversity and geodiversity. Creation of a new national park was recommended by the Conservation Authority in 1993, but the Kahurangi National Park was not established until 1996. The new park was based largely on the area that had previously been the North West Nelson Forest Park, along with the Tasman Wilderness Area.

After initial consultation, about 60 areas were excluded from the national park for a variety of reasons. The idea of a national park locking up land was controversial with West Coast constituents, and 120,000 ha (300,000 acres) were taken out in the south-west corner; this included the Buller Coalfields. Mining interests successfully lobbied to have the areas around Sams Creek (gold) and Mount Burnett (dolomite) excluded. The Aorere Goldfields Reserve inland from Parapara and Collingwood, covering the area where a gold rush happened starting in 1857, was excluded for its mineral potential. The Electricity Corporation had hydro operations excluded from the park, for example the Cobb Reservoir, the Cobb Power Station, and the associated penstock. Similarly, the Onekaka Dam was also carved out of the park, with the power station resurrected after the national park came into existence. Many grazing leases and sphagnum moss gathering sites were also excluded. Farewell Spit was excluded because it was felt that it was already well protected, and the area was not contiguous with the rest of the national park. An area known as Taitapu, south of Whanganui Inlet, was excluded over an unresolved Treaty of Waitangi claim.

At the time of approval, the new national park was the 13th national park to be established in New Zealand, and protected 452,000 ha (1,120,000 acres) of land. In his announcement about the establishment of the park, the Minister of Conservation, Denis Marshall said: "It consists of extensive areas of native forest and limestone and marble landscape which has international significance".

For the official opening, a ministerial party led by the prime minister, Jim Bolger, Denis Marshall, and Nick Smith (MP for the Tasman electorate) tramped along the Mt Arthur Tableland to stay in Balloon Hut, south of the Cobb Reservoir. From there, they walked out to the Cobb Dam for the official opening.

Five small parcels consisting of unmodified coastal areas and forest with high conservation values totalling 900 ha (2,200 acres) were added to the park in 2016.

=== Proposed World Heritage Site ===
In 2007, Kahurangi National Park was added to the tentative list of UNESCO World Heritage Sites, along with Farewell Spit and the Canaan karst system.

=== Addition of Mōkihinui River catchment ===
The Mōkihinui River is a river on the West Coast about 40 kilometres north of Westport. The river catchment area is a largely unmodified landscape of open tussock, podocarp-beech forests, and the pristine river itself. The area was highly rated for its biodiversity values, but prior to 2019, it was classified as stewardship land − the lowest level of protection for publicly-owned conservation land. In 2007, Meridian Energy had proposed to build the Mokihinui Hydro project on the river. The project was controversial and in May 2012 it was cancelled.

In 2019, 64,400 ha (159,000 acres) of land in the Mōkihinui River catchment, including 15 km (9.3 mi) of river bed, were added to Kahurangi National Park. The addition increased the size of the park by 14%. The area added to the park includes part of the route of the Old Ghost Road, a 85-kilometre (53 mi) mountain biking and hiking trail that follows a historic gold miners' route.

The significance of the Mokihinui region to the Ngāi Tahu iwi and Ngāti Waewae, the rūnanga for the area, was marked with the placement of a pouwhenua in July 2019.

== Geology ==
The park is geologically one of the oldest and most complex areas in New Zealand with basement rocks dominating the landscape. The Paleozoic Buller and Tākaka terranes, separated down the middle of the park by the Anatoki Fault, form the geological basement.

The Buller Terrane contains Ordovician metasedimentary turbidites, extensively intruded by Late Devonian granitoids and to a lesser extent, Early Cretaceous granitoids. To the east the Tākaka Terrane comprises an older sequence of Cambrian volcanic and volcaniclastic arc-related sedimentary rocks, and a prominent mélange unit. The oldest fossils found in New Zealand, trilobites, are present in the sedimentary rocks. Overlying the arc-related sequence is a Late Cambrian to Early Devonian passive margin succession of clastic and carbonate sedimentary rocks. The Tākaka Terrane has been intruded by Late Devonian mafic/ultramafic rocks and Early Cretaceous granitoids. The Buller and Takaka terranes were amalgamated in the early Middle Devonian.

A regional unconformity separates Late Cretaceous and younger sedimentary rocks from the basement. Late Cretaceous to Early Eocene sediments were deposited in basins in the north of the park. After a period of erosion the Late Eocene saw deposition of coal measures followed by calcareous sediments and limestone in the Oligocene. Renewed tectonic activity in the Miocene-Pliocene resulted in emerging land and sediments becoming terrigenous. The rapid uplift of the Southern Alps in the Pliocene-Pleistocene led to substantial volumes of gravels being deposited, particularly in the Karamea district. Ongoing tectonic activity caused by the convergence of the Pacific and Australian plates has resulted in a mountainous topography.

Extensive glaciation during the Pleistocene created many “U” shaped valleys and glacial tarns. In a few places Oligocene limestone has been sculpted by water and ice to form the best examples of uplifted mesas in New Zealand. Landslides are a common feature in the steeper areas of the park and many were triggered by earthquakes. Within the park lies part of New Zealand’s deepest and most intensely deformed Paleogene-Neogene sedimentary basin.

=== Karst landforms ===
Uplifted Early Ordovician limestone, extensively altered to marble, has led to significant examples of karst topography. The park has extensive limestone and marble formations, natural arches, sinkholes and bluffs. Some of the longest and deepest cave systems found in the Southern Hemisphere are located in the park, including three of New Zealand's largest cave systems. Nettlebed Cave was connected to Stormy Pot in January 2014, making the system the deepest known cave in the Southern Hemisphere. Nettlebed Cave drops 1,180 metres (3,870 ft) below its upper entrance to its lower exit at the Pearse River resurgence and is 48 kilometres (30 mi) long.

=== Fossil records ===
The oldest fossils ever found in New Zealand were identified during an expedition in 1948 in the Cobb Valley at a site that is now within Kahurangi National Park. The fossils were identified as trilobites from the Cambrian (542–490 Ma), the first period of the paleozoic era. A tramping hut near to the location of the find is known as Trilobite Hut.

Fossils of takahē have been found at Mt Arthur and in the Euphrates Cave on the Garibaldi Plateau. The Euphrates Cave skull supports "the hypothesis that takahē were widespread across the South Island's subalpine habitats and lowland areas at the time of human arrival in New Zealand".

== Geography ==
Kahurangi is New Zealand's second-largest national park, with an area of 5,193 km^{2} (2,005 sq mi). It covers most of the north-west corner of the South Island, and extends from the Buller River near Murchison in the south, to the base of Farewell Spit in Golden Bay in the north.

The park has no single dominant landform, but includes an unusually wide variety of landscapes, including mountain ranges, rivers, gorges, raised peneplains and karst features such as caves and arches. Many of the landforms within the park are considered to be nationally or internationally significant.

=== Coastline ===
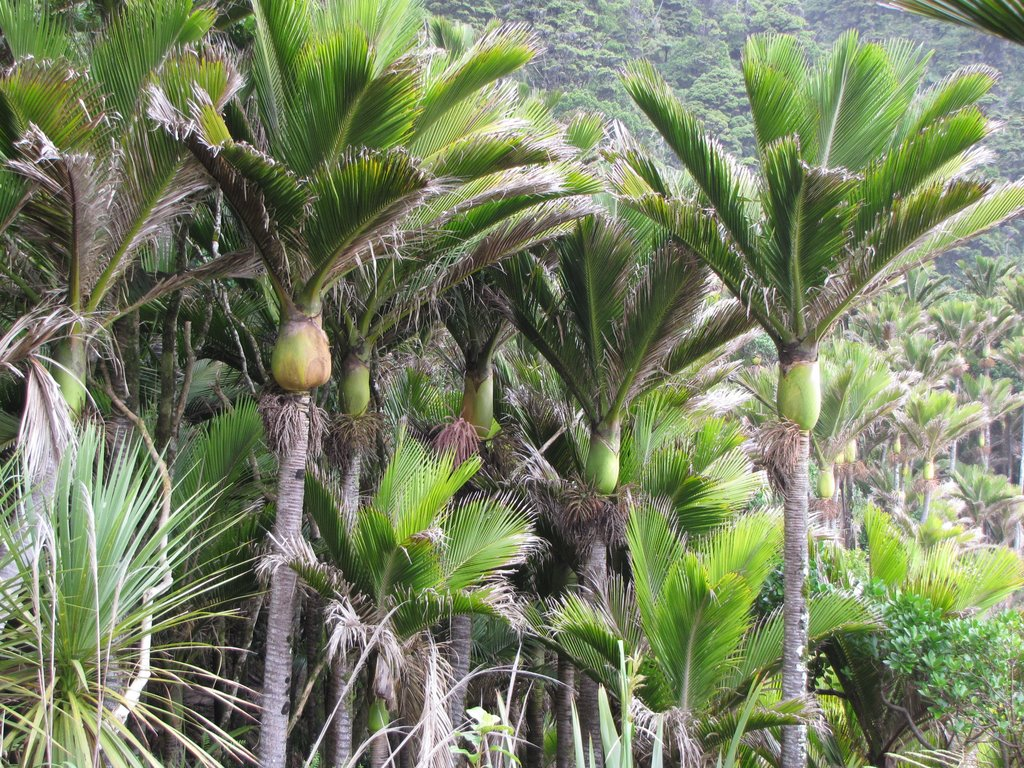
Dense grove of nīkau palms – Heaphy Track

The western boundary of the park follows the route of the Heaphy Track along the coast from just south of the Kōhaihai River past Scotts Beach and north to the mouth of the Heaphy River. The route of the Heaphy Track then moves inland, but the park boundary carries on along the coastline to just past Kahurangi Point. This northern section of coastline is known for its steep cliffs.

The boundary of the park extends to mean high water springs, so does not include beaches below the high tide mark. The entire coastline from Kōhaihai to Kahurangi Point is considered nationally significant because it is almost totally unmodified, and includes a narrow strip of highly diverse coastal forest, including nīkau palms. The nīkau palms are New Zealand's only native species in the palm family, and the section of coastline north of Kōhaihai is one of the easiest places to see large groves. The grove close to the Kohaihai end of the Heaphy Track is claimed to be the largest in the South Island.

The Kahurangi Marine Reserve is not part of the national park but is immediately adjacent to its western coastline. It extends along 16 km (9.9 mi) between Wekakura Point and Crayfish Point, and 5 km (3.1 mi) out to sea. It is one of the largest marine reserves around the North or South Islands. The northern end of the coast is a habitat for fur seals (Kekeno) and Hector's dolphins, and driftwood along the coast is a habitat for animals like earwigs, sandhoppers and spiders. Rocky reefs and seastacks provide a habitat for encrusting animals, invertebrates and inshore fish that thrive in murky waters.

=== Gouland Downs ===
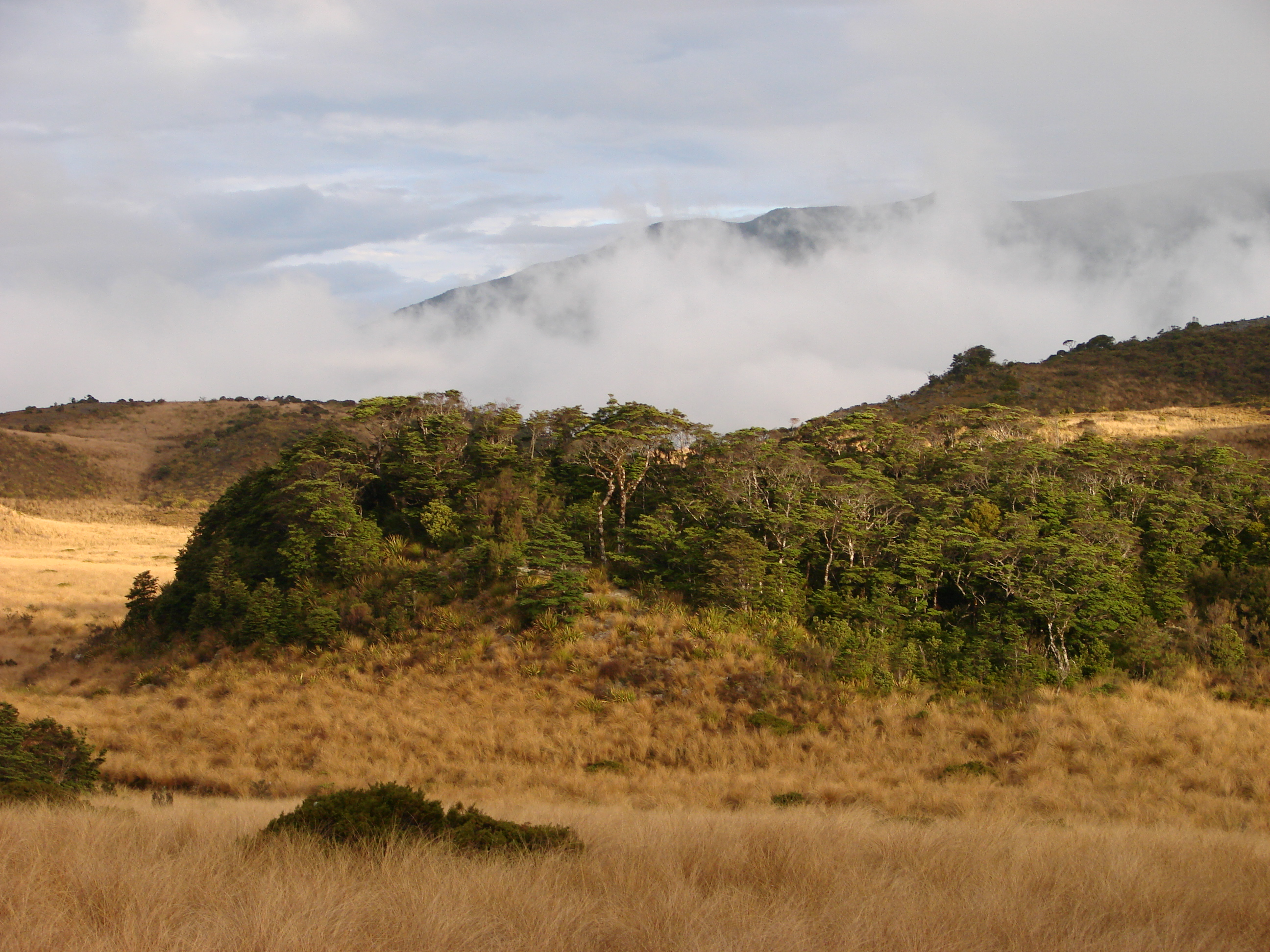
Forest covered outcrop in Gouland Downs

The Gouland Downs is a tussock-covered basin at around 600 m (2,000 ft) elevation, surrounded by forest. It occupies an area of around 6,500 ha (16,000 acres). The area has unusual flora and fauna and was first declared as a sanctuary in 1915.

This area is a peneplain, a low-relief plain formed from prolonged erosion. Beneath the tussock in the Gouland Downs are sandstone and mudstone sedimentary rocks that were formed in the Lower Palaeozoic era around 400 to 500 million years ago. They are some of the oldest rocks in New Zealand. These rocks were worn down by erosion to form the peneplain around 100 million years ago. They were then submerged beneath a shallow sea, and limestone was deposited on top of the older sedimentary rocks. The land was subsequently uplifted, and erosion removed most of the limestone, leaving isolated outcrops that now appear like tree-covered islands in the tussock landscape. The remaining areas of the Gouland Downs have shallow and infertile soil where the only plants that thrive are tussocks and rushes.

=== Cobb Valley ===
The Cobb region is a montane catchment on argillite, ancient volcanics, and ultramafics. It supports beech and conifer-beech forests, valley floor scrub and tussock-grasslands, and sub-alpine grasslands. The region includes several alpine lakes and the Cobb Reservoir – a hydro-electric storage lake that is entirely surrounded by the national park.

=== Mount Arthur Tablelands ===
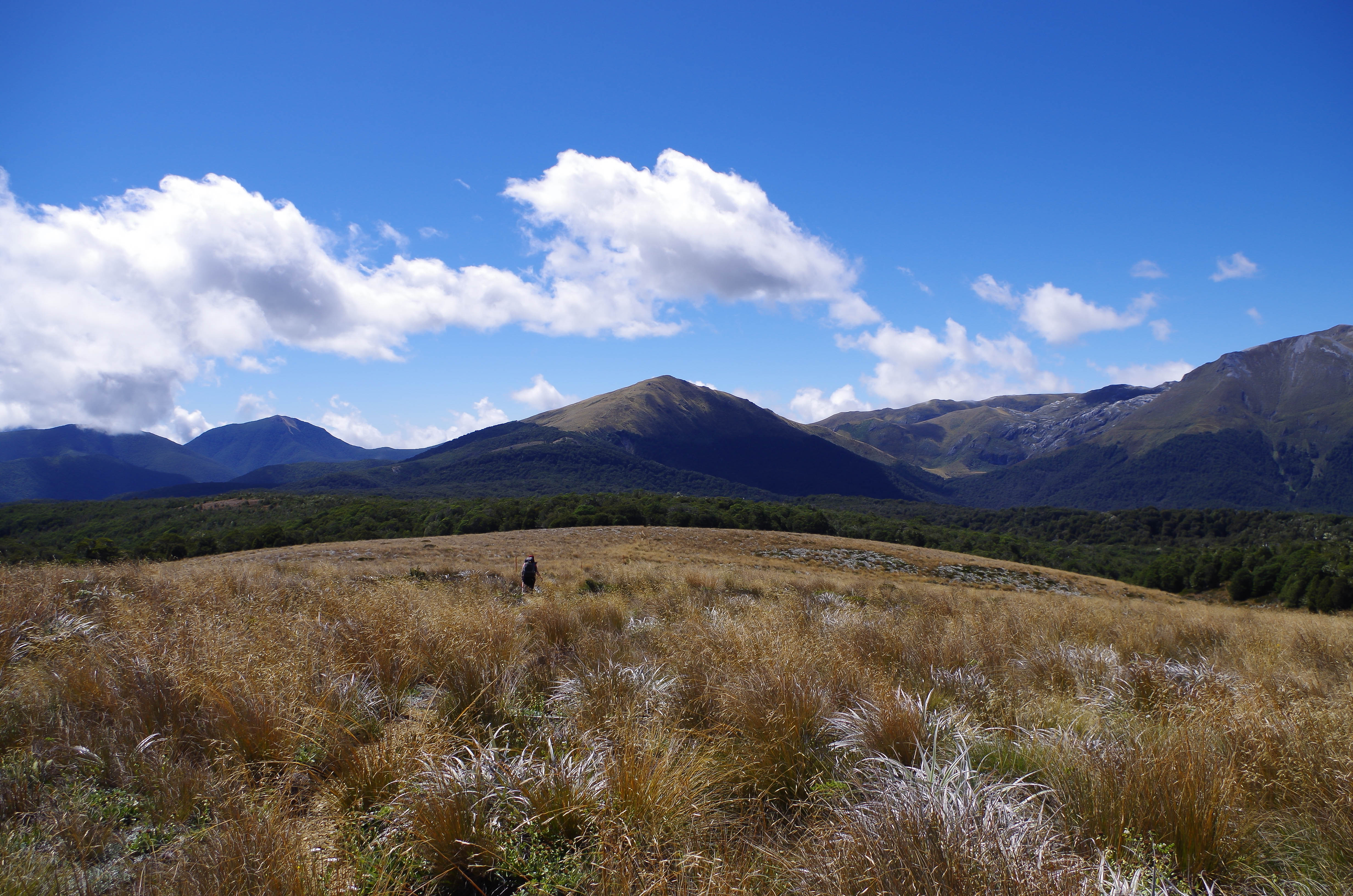
The park hosts a large variety of animals and plants unique to this geographical location, including the Grass Tablelands seen here.

The Tablelands to the west of Mount Arthur are a rolling landscape of tussock and karst features at an elevation of around 1,200 m (3,900 ft). The area is surrounded by the peaks of Mount Lodestone (1,462 m), Mount Arthur (1,795 m) and Mount Peel (1,654 m).

=== Ōpārara Basin ===
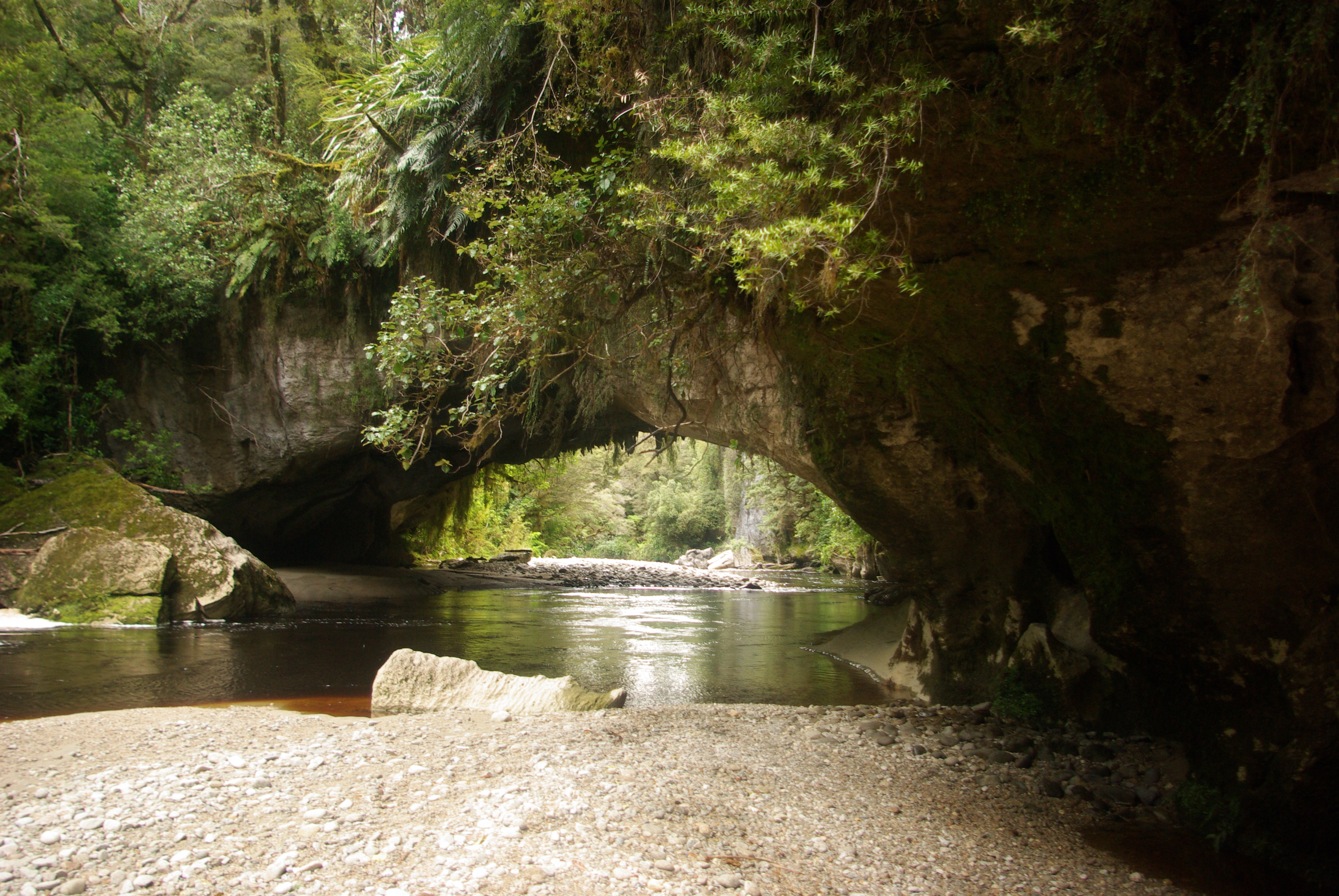
Moria Gate arch in Ōpārara Basin, Kahurangi National Park

The Ōpārara Basin is a basin at around 200 m (660 ft) elevation that is covered in dense forest and drained by the Ōpārara River. It is located 20 kilometres (12 mi) north of Karamea. The basin is notable for a network of caves rich in fossils, and its large natural rock arches. Ōpārara Arch is New Zealand’s largest natural arch, at 200 m (660 ft) in length and 37 m (121 ft) in height. The area is considered as one of the most outstanding examples of limestone karst landscapes in New Zealand. There are multiple short walks in the area that are popular with visitors.

The Honeycomb Hill Cave area in the basin was discovered in 1976, and in 1982 was given the status of a site of global significance in paleozoology due to discoveries of bones of several species that had become extinct. In 1984, the first systematic discovery campaign led to finds of the bones of fifty birds, most of which were extinct species. In 2008, an area of 38 ha (94 acres) was designated as the Honeycomb Hill Caves Specially Protected Area. Access to this area is restricted and by permit only.

=== Tasman Wilderness Area ===
The Tasman Wilderness Area is protected as a wilderness area under the National Parks Act 1980 section 14. The Tasman Wilderness covers 86,946 ha (214,850 acres) within Kahurangi National Park. It is located in the central and western areas of the park, inland of the Ōpārara Basin and to the south of the route of the Heaphy Track. The centre of the wilderness area is Lake Aorere adjacent to Mount Domett (elevation 1,645 m (5,397 ft). The wilderness area includes the catchments of the Roaring Lion, Spey, Burgoo, Beautiful, and Ugly rivers, among others. It takes around a week to traverse the wilderness area in any direction. Tracks, facilities and the use of vehicles are prohibited, in accordance with its status as a wilderness.

=== Rivers ===
The park receives high annual rainfall, with the average annual rainfall in many areas exceeding 4,800 mm (190 in). Rainfall intensity can exceed 240 mm (9.4 in) in 24 hours, over much of the park. The high annual rainfall and high intensity, combined with the complex landforms and mountainous terrain creates a large number of steep rivers with the potential to cause significant flooding of low-lying land in the flood plains surrounding the park.

The Karamea River drains to the Tasman Sea through the Ōtūmahana Estuary at Karamea, and is the largest river in the park. It has a catchment area of 1,210 km^{2} (470 mi^{2}) including its tributaries that represents around 23% of the entire area of Kahurangi National Park. Another major river draining the western areas of the park is the Mōkihinui, with a total catchment area of approximately 750 km^{2} (290 sq mi) of which 685 km^{2} (264 sq mi) is in the park, upstream of Seddonville.

The Aorere River and its tributaries have a catchment area of 573 km^{2} (221 sq mi) draining the Haupiri and Wakamarama ranges in the north of the park. The river flows northwards for 40 km (25 mi) into Golden Bay at the town of Collingwood. The Wangapeka River drains eastern regions of the park, and has a catchment area of 479 km^{2} (185 sq mi).

== Climate ==
The weather in Kahurangi National Park is very changeable, especially at high altitudes. After heavy rainfall many rivers and streams become impassable. In winter, heavy snowfalls may occur at higher altitudes. For the Heaphy Track, in January and February, the average daily high temperature is between 21 °C (70 °F) and 23 °C (73 °F) with lows between 10 °C (50 °F) and 11 °C (52 °F). July is the coldest month, with average daily high of 13 °C (55 °F) and lows of 1 °C (34 °F).

The average annual rainfall at Karamea, at the western boundary of the park is around 2,400 mm (94 in) but at sites with western exposure and at higher elevations, the annual rainfall can reach 6,000 mm (240 in). However, on the eastern side of the park, the climate is typically drier. In prevailing westerly conditions, moisture-laden air from the Tasman Sea is forced to rise over the high elevations of the western ranges. As the air rises, it cools and the stored water vapour condenses to form rain. This is known as orographic precipitation. As the airstream continues to the east beyond the mountains, it holds much less moisture, leading to reduced annual rainfall in the east. The effect can be seen in the west to east progression of average annual rainfall in towns to the north of the park boundary, with Collingwood having 3,371 mm (132.7 in), Tākaka having 2,012 mm (79.2 in), and Motueka 1,341 mm (52.8 in).

== Ecology ==
Kahurangi National Park is known for its biodiversity. A metaphor used in describing the park is that it is a "tectonic ark" that separated from Gondwana around 80 million years ago. There is a particularly high rate of endemism for both flora and fauna, with many notable species that are not found elsewhere. The high level of endemism has arisen as a result of complex biogeographic processes, and indicates that during the Pleistocene ice ages, the area was an important refuge.

=== Flora ===
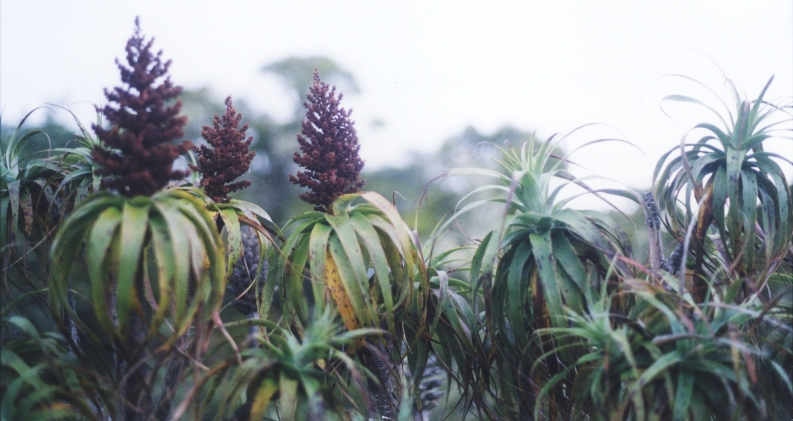
Dracophyllum traversii in the park

The complex geology and landforms have allowed unique plant communities to develop in localised environments, leading to a high rate of endemism. The park has exceptional botanical diversity. New Zealand has around 2,400 species of native plants, and over half of these are found in the park, including 67 that are endemic – found nowhere else. The range of species present in the park far exceeds the diversity of native plants in any other New Zealand National Park. Further, Kahurangi National Park has 80% of all New Zealand's alpine species.

Notable plants that are endemic to Kahurangi National Park or the immediately adjacent region include:

- Aciphylla anomala
- Aciphylla trifoliolata
- Brachyglottis hectorii
- Bulbinella talbotii
- Carex calcis
- Carex cremnicola
- Carex dolomitica
- Carex impexa
- Celmisia dallii
- Celmisia dubia
- Celmisia gibbsii
- Celmisia parva
- Celmisia rupestris
- Celmisia similis
- Clematis marmoraria
- Colobanthus squarrosus
- Coprosma talbrockiei
- Dracophyllum marmoricola
- Dracophyllum ophioliticum
- Epilobium margaretiae
- Forstera cristis
- Gentianella angustifolia
- Gentianella vernicosa
- Gentianella decumbens
- Gentianella filipes
- Leptinella calcarea
- Montia drucei
- Myosotis angustata
- Myosotis brockiei subsp. brockiei
- Myosotis chaffeyorum (Chaffey’s Forget-me-not)
- Myosotis concinna
- Myosotis mooreana
- Pittosporum dallii (or Kahurangi pittosporum).
- Poranthera alpina
- Pseudowintera traversii
- Ranunculus mirus
- Senecio glaucophyllus
- Veronica albicans
- Veronica calcicola
- Veronica ochracea
- Veronica masoniae
- Veronica townsonii

=== Fauna ===
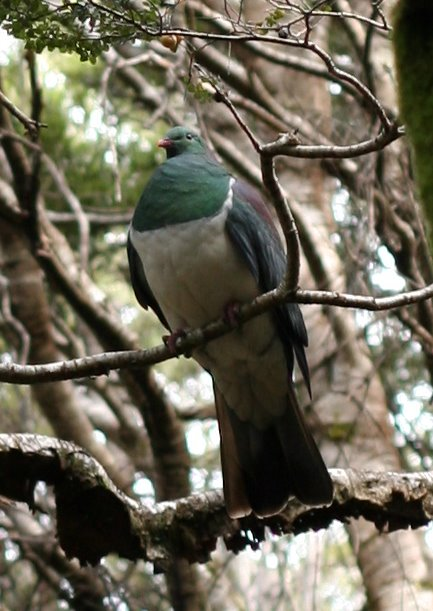
A kererū in Flora Valley (2006)

The fauna of the park includes around 18 endemic bird species including some classified as endangered such as the rock wren, kea, blue duck (whio), and species such as the great spotted kiwi and kākā (both classified as vulnerable). Other native birds that can be found in the park include pipit, kererū, the New Zealand falcon, weka, robin, fantail, bellbird, grey warbler, tūī, tomtit, rifleman, fernbird and brown creeper. In addition to the whio, freshwater birds that are found in wetlands and waterways in the park include the Australasian bittern (classified as vulnerable), and the New Zealand scaup.

The park is also a key habitat for Powelliphanta, a group of carnivorous native land snails. Of the 64 known species of Powelliphanta, 29 are endemic — found only in Kahurangi National Park.

Both of New Zealand's only native land mammals, the short-tailed bat (pekapeka) and the long-tailed bat (pekapeka tou-roa) have been identified in the park. A new species of skink, Oligosoma kahurangi was identified in 2021. It was found in slate scree in montane tussock grassland. It has been classified as Threatened − Nationally Critical.

There is a wide diversity of terrestrial and aquatic invertebrates in the park, and many of these are endemic, such as the Mount Arthur giant wētā. The extensive areas of karst and multiple cave systems within the park provided habitat for cave dwelling species. One notable example is the Nelson cave spider Spelungula, a monotypic genus of large-clawed spiders that has only been found in caves in the northwestern part of the South Island.

A new species of flightless cricket was discovered in the park in 2023. The snail Cytora kahurangi was named after the park.

Opacuincola gretathunbergae, a species of freshwater snail that was discovered in the park in 2016 was named after the activist Greta Thunberg.

== Conservation and human interaction ==
=== Conservation programmes ===
==== Ecosystem Management Units ====
The Department of Conservation has defined a large number of Ecosystem Management Units (EMU) across New Zealand. These are areas that have been selected for priority attention, based on the ecosystems and species they contain. The EMU areas within Kahurangi National Park are:

- Aorere River
- Big River − MacKay − Gouland Downs
- Break Creek pakihi
- Cobb
- Devil − Anatoki Ranges
- Grange − Morgan − Grindley tops
- Heaphy
- Hope Range
- Leslie
- Matiri Plateau
- Mokihinui
- Mokihinui Gorge
- Mount Owen
- Ōpārara
- Wharepapa / Arthur Range

==== Pest control ====
As part of the Department of Conservation's national pest control programme, aerial drops of 1080 poison are used to control rats in the park as a means of protecting native species. The use of 1080 has been controversial.

==== Flora Stream catchment recovery ====
The Friends of Flora is a conservation volunteer group established in 2001 to help "bring about the protection and/or return of endangered and threatened flora and fauna to the Flora Stream catchment area". As of 2024, the society has approximately 68 km (42 mi) of trap lines to control stoats, protecting around 5,000 ha (12,000 acres) of beech forest and tussockland habitat. The society is focussed on the recovery of whio (blue duck) in the Flora Stream catchment, and the re-introduction of Great spotted kiwi. A wasp eradication programme is in place, and bird monitoring is also part of the society's programme.

==== Ōpārara catchment recovery ====
The Ōpārara Source to Sea project was created in 2014 by a group of Karamea locals. In 2023, the project received funding from Lottery Environment and Heritage fund and the Department of Conservation’s Community Conservation Fund to support their work in weed control, predator monitoring, and planting throughout the Ōpārara estuary and catchment over the next three years.

==== Takahē recovery ====
Endangered takahē were reintroduced to the park in 2018, with the release of 18 birds into the Gouland Downs. This was 100 years after takahē became extinct there. The following year, the population had grown to 31, and further releases were planned. There was a set-back in 2020 when 11 birds died. Some may have been poisoned during an aerial drop of 1080 to control predators. In 2021, another 15 young takahē were translocated into the Gouland Downs area.

==== Whio (Blue duck) recovery ====
Conservation initiatives for whio (blue duck) in the park have resulted in a large increase in their numbers since 1998–2000 when surveys of the population were first conducted. As of 2023, there are 846 adult birds, including 335 breeding pairs. This is a 340% increase on numbers found in 2000. Areas of focus for whio conservation within the park include "recovery sites" at the Gouland Downs, Pearse River and Flora Stream, and high priority "security" sites at Ōpārara River and the Wangapeka and Fyffe rivers.

=== Access ===
The main gateway towns for access to Kahurangi National Park are Tākaka, Motueka, Karamea, Tapawera and Murchison. The main Department of Conservation visitor centre for the region is located in Nelson, but the towns adjacent to Kahurangi National Park also have local information centres.

The access road to the Cobb Reservoir is the only road into the interior of the national park.

=== Activities ===
Popular activities in Kahurangi National Park include tramping, mountain biking, rafting and caving.

==== Heaphy Track ====
The Heaphy Track is a popular tramping and mountain biking track in Kahurangi National Park, classified as one of New Zealand's ten Great Walks. Named after Charles Heaphy, the track is 78.4 kilometres (48.7 mi) long and is usually walked in four or five days. The track is open for shared use with mountain bikers in the winter season from 1 May to 30 September each year. The southern end of the track is at Kōhaihai, north of Karamea on the northern West Coast, and the northern end is in the upper valley of the Aorere River southwest of Collingwood.

==== Wangapeka Track ====
The Wangapeka Track is another of the main tramping tracks in the Kahurangi National Park. The route traverses the southern end of the park, from the historic Wangapeka goldfields area west of Tapawera, to the coastal plains of the West Coast at Little Wanganui. The route is 59 km (37 mi) long, and crosses the Wangapeka and Little Wanganui saddles, each over 1,000 m (3,300 ft) in elevation. The track passes through the valleys of the Wangapeka River, Karamea River, Taipō River and Little Wanganui River. The majority of the track is in river valleys and under forest cover, with small sections in tussock land at Stag Flat and the Little Wanganui Saddle. It typically takes walkers 4–6 days to complete the route.

==== Old Ghost Road ====
The Old Ghost Road is an 85 km (53 mi) long mountain bike and tramping trail that was part-funded as one of the projects of the New Zealand Cycle Trail initiative. The trailheads are the Lyell Historic Reserve on State Highway 6 in the Upper Buller Gorge, and the Rough and Tumble Bush Lodge, located 4 km (2.5 mi) from Seddonville, northwest of Westport on the West Coast. In 2019, 64,400 ha (159,000 acres) of conservation stewardship land in the Mōkihinui River catchment was added to Kahurangi National Park, including much of the route of the Old Ghost Road trail.

==== Caving ====
Kahurangi National Park is one of the top three locations for caving in New Zealand, and as of 2024, it has the longest and deepest known cave systems in the country. Bulmer Cavern is New Zealand's longest cave system, running for 74.3 km (46.2 mi) in the Mount Owen region. In 2014, a link was found between the Nettlebed and Stormy Pot caves in the Mount Arthur region of the park, creating a system that was around 10 km (6.2 mi) long and 1,200 m (3,900 ft) deep, and the deepest in New Zealand. At the time of discovery, it was claimed to be the deepest cave in the Southern Hemisphere.

==== River rafting ====
The Karamea River is a highly rated wilderness river for rafting expeditions. A 30 km (19 mi) rafting journey is possible over three days, passing through Grade 3 rapids in the upper reaches to Grade 5 rapids in the Karamea Gorge.

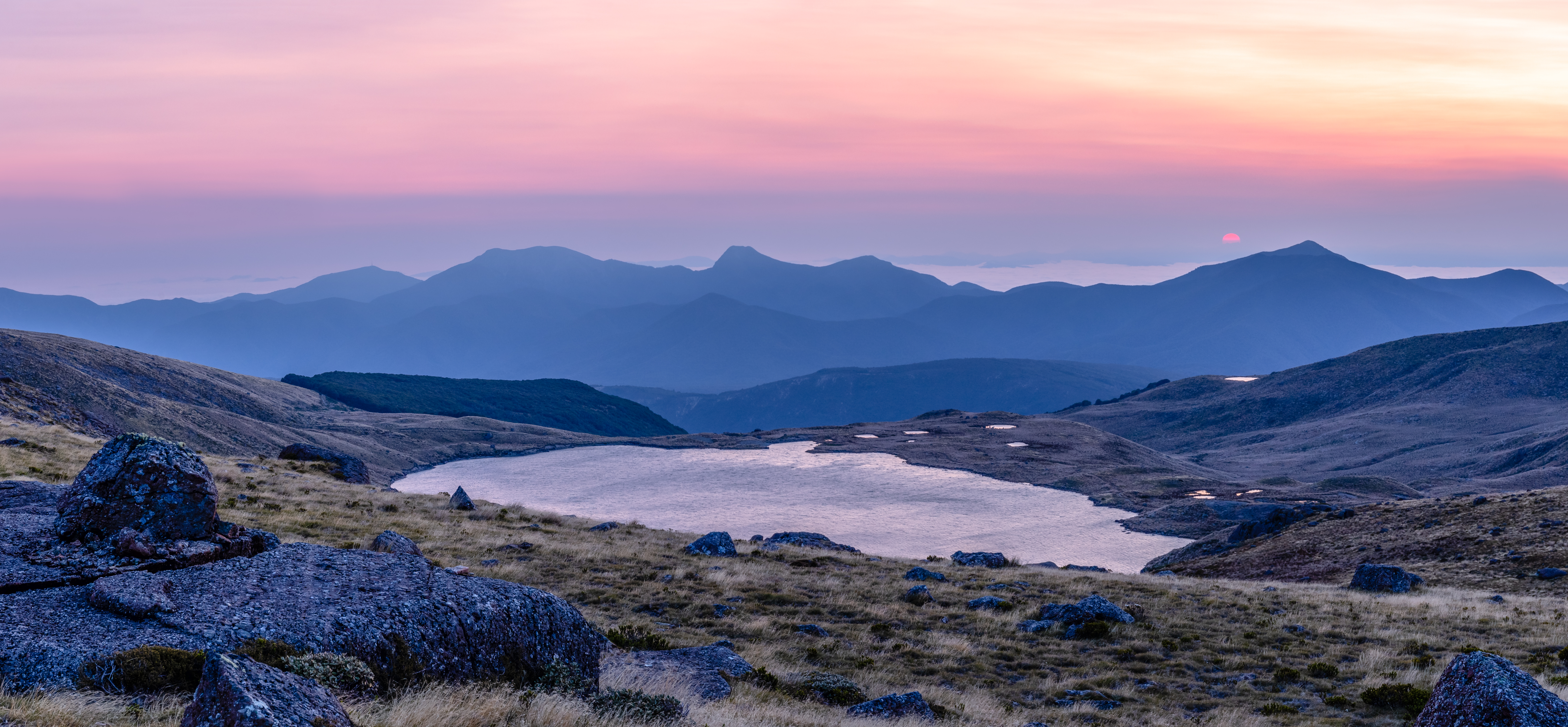
Lake Sylvester during the sunrise in Kahurangi

== In popular culture ==
Several locations in Kahurangi National Park were used during the making of the Lord of the Rings film series, including Mount Owen and Mount Olympus. Tolkien tourism has created a demand for helicopter access for visiting these locations. Restrictions on helicopter access are in place to help preserve natural and recreation values.

Kahurangi National Park is the setting for a young adult novel Night Tribe, written by Peter Butler, a Nelson-based entrepreneur and author.

== See also ==
- Conservation parks of New Zealand
- Forest parks of New Zealand
- Regional parks of New Zealand
- Protected areas of New Zealand
- Conservation in New Zealand
- Biodiversity of New Zealand
- Tramping in New Zealand
