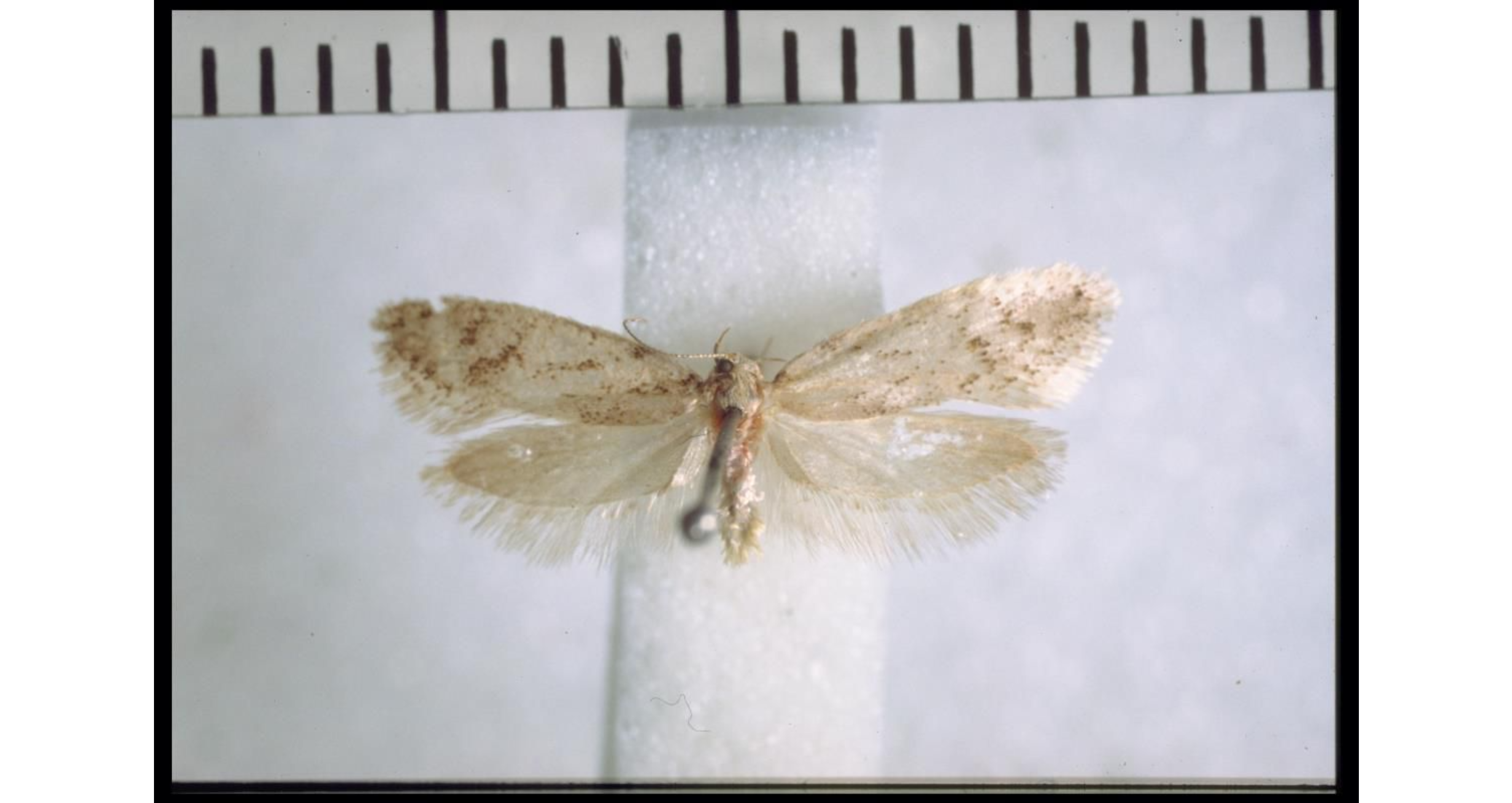
- Male holotype

Scientific classification
- Kingdom: Animalia
- Phylum: Arthropoda
- Class: Insecta
- Order: Lepidoptera
- Family: Oecophoridae
- Genus: Tingena
- Species: T. pallidula

Binomial name
- Tingena pallidula (Philpott, 1924)

Synonyms
- Borkhausenia pallidula Philpott, 1924

= Tingena pallidula =

Species of moth, endemic to New Zealand

Tingena pallidula is a species of moth in the family Oecophoridae. It is endemic to New Zealand and has been collected in the Nelson and Tasman regions. Adults of this species are on the wing in February and have been collected by beating undergrowth.

== Taxonomy ==
This species was described by Alfred Philpott in 1924 and named Borkhausenia pallidula using specimens collected at Gouland Downs on the Kahurangi National Park in February. George Hudson discussed this species in his 1928 book The butterflies and moths of New Zealand under that name. In 1988 J. S. Dugdale placed this species in the genus Tingena. The male holotype specimen is held in the New Zealand Arthropod Collection.

== Description ==
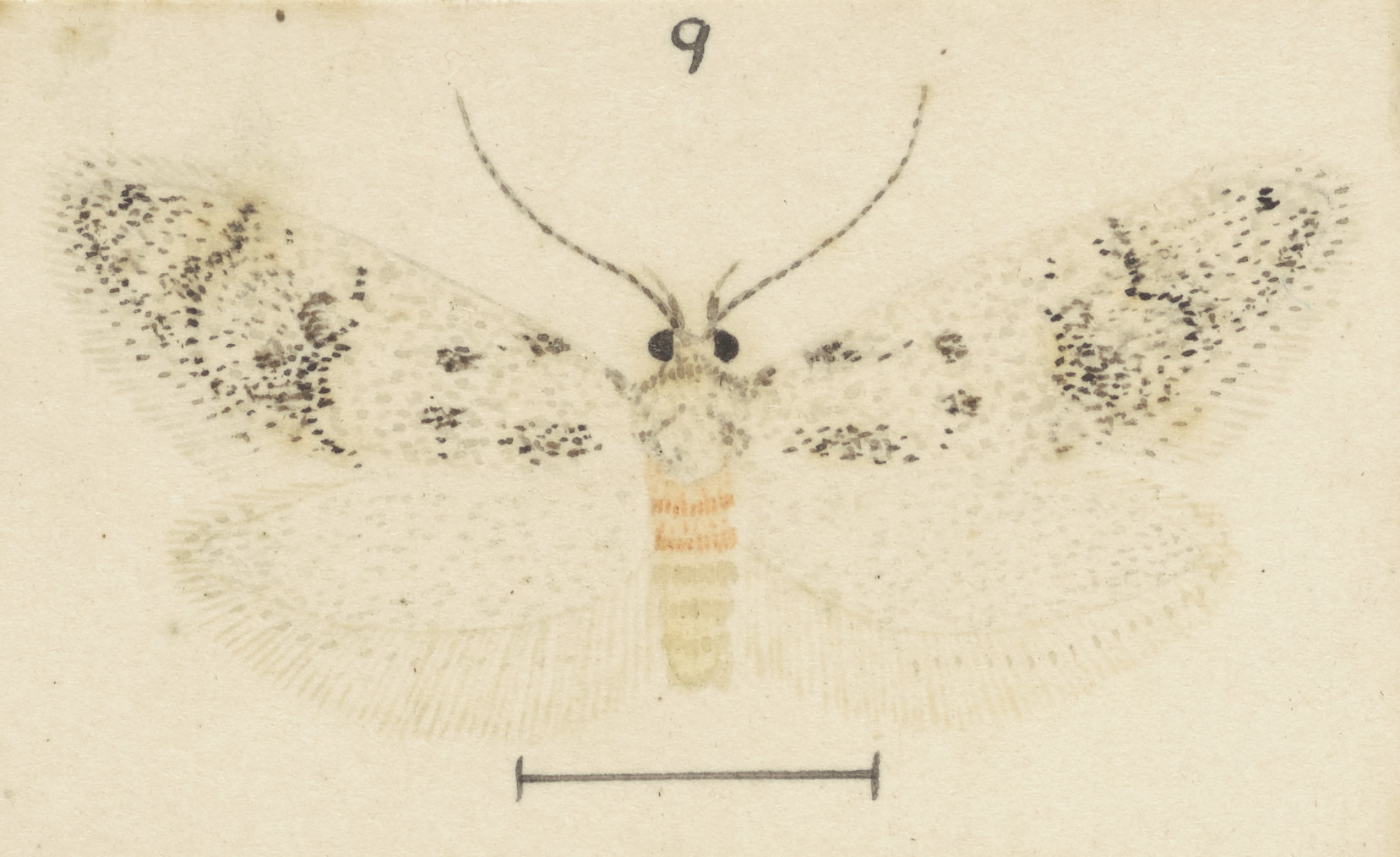
Illustration by George Hudson.

Philpott described this species as follows:

♂. 13–14 mm. Head pale whitish-ochreous. Palpi whitish-ochreous, outwardly infuscated. Antennae whitish-ochreous, annulated with fuscous, ciliation in ♂ 1. Thorax white mixed with pale fuscous. Abdomen ochreous-whitish, basal segments white, anal tuft brighter ochreous. Legs whitish-ochreous, more or less infuscated. Forewings rather elongated, costa evenly arched, apex blunt-pointed, termen rounded, very oblique; white, irrorated with pale fuscous; many blackish-fuscous scales, tending to form an irregular spot in disc at ¾ and a series of terminal dots: cilia grey-whitish, fuscous-tinged apically, with a fuscous basal line. Hindwings grey-whitish, fuscous-tinged apically: cilia grey-whitish with an indistinct dark basal line.

== Distribution ==
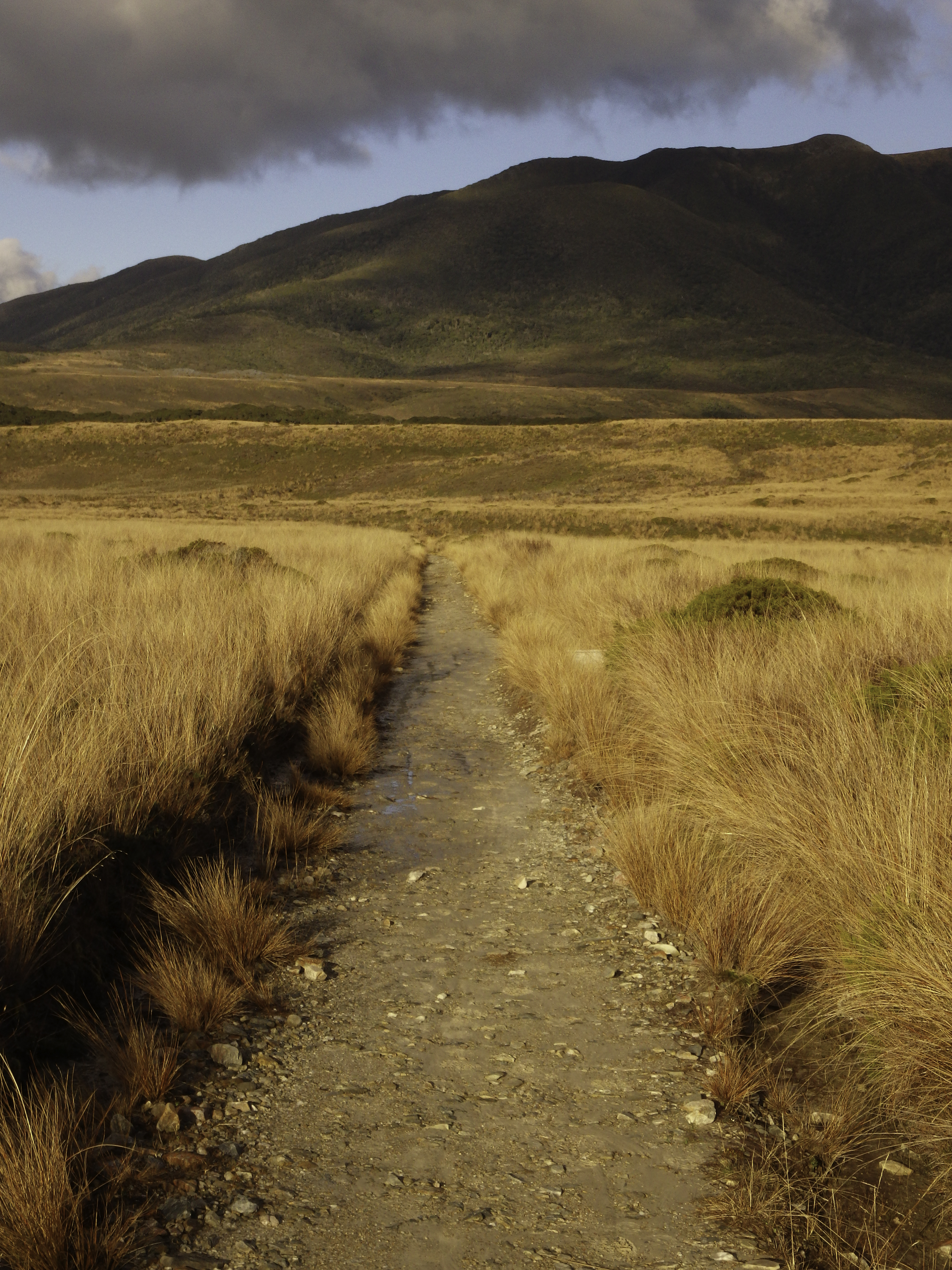
Type locality of this species - Gouland Downs.

This species is endemic to New Zealand and has been observed in the Nelson and Taman districts.

== Behaviour ==
Adults of this species are on the wing in February and have been collected by beating undergrowth.
