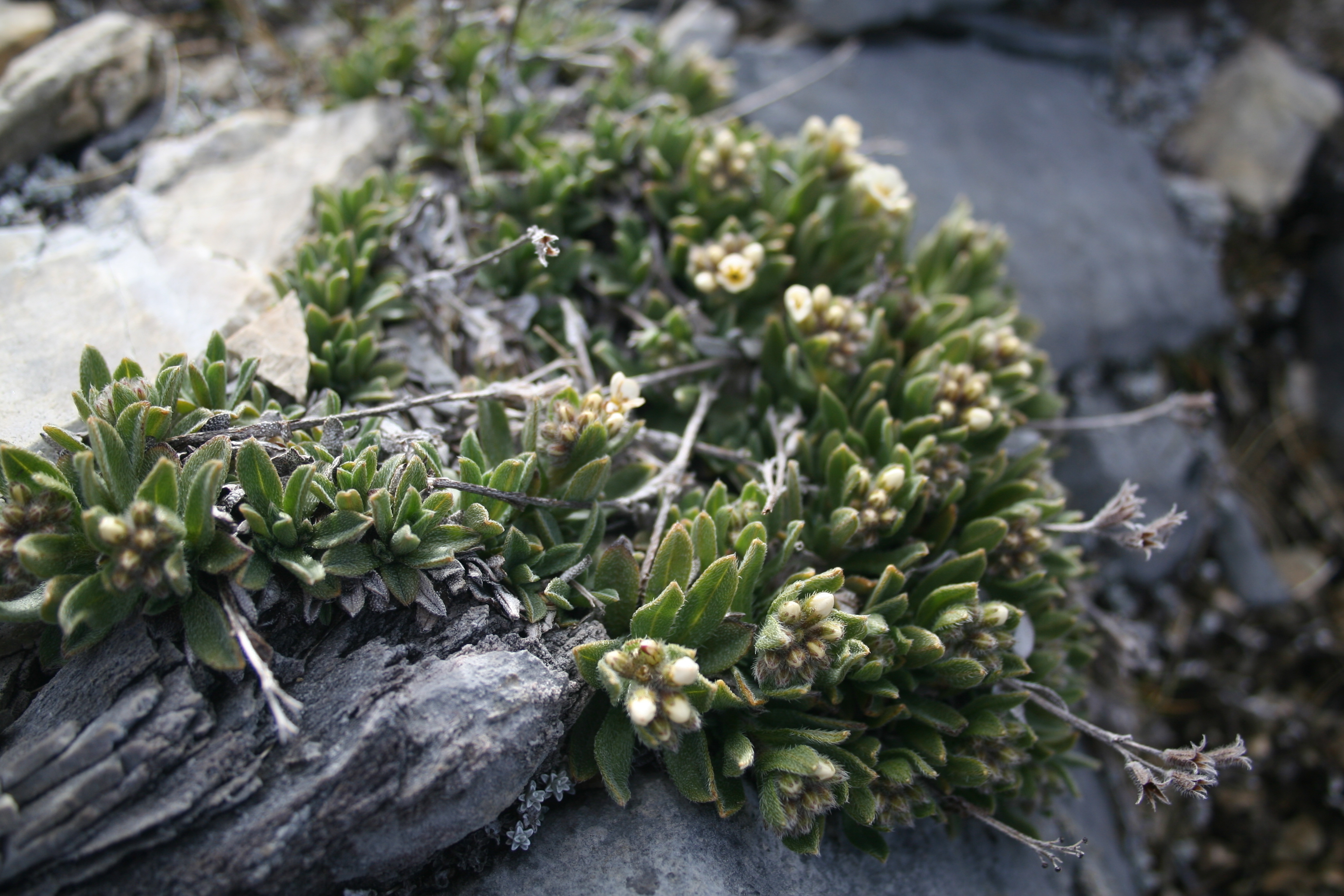

Conservation status
- Nationally Critical (NZ TCS)

Scientific classification
- Kingdom: Plantae
- Clade: Tracheophytes
- Clade: Angiosperms
- Clade: Eudicots
- Clade: Asterids
- Order: Boraginales
- Family: Boraginaceae
- Genus: Myosotis
- Species: M. angustata

Binomial name
- Myosotis angustata Cheeseman

= Myosotis angustata =

Species of flowering plant

Myosotis angustata is a species of flowering plant in the family Boraginaceae, endemic to the South Island of New Zealand. Thomas Cheeseman described the species in 1906. Plants of this species of forget-me-not are perennial rosettes with ebracteate inflorescences and white corollas with stamens that are wholly exserted.

== Description ==
M. angustata plants are rosettes. The rosette leaves have broad petioles that difficult to distinguish from the leaf blades. The rosette leaves are about 20 mm long by 4 mm wide (length: width ratio 5: 1), usually linear-spathulate and widest at or above the middle, with an subacute apex. Both surfaces of the leaf are uniformly and densely covered in appressed hairs, with lower density on the lower surface. Each rosette has several ascending to erect, ebracteate inflorescences that are up to 150 mm long. The cauline leaves are similar to the rosette leaves, but become smaller, are linear or narrow-oblong and subacute, and have hairs similar to the rosette leaves. The flowers are many per inflorescence, and each is borne on a short pedicel, each with a bract.

The calyx is 5–8 mm long at flowering and fruiting, lobed to one-half of its length, and densely covered in straight hairs, as well as some hooked hairs, all of which are antrorse. The corolla is white and about 7 mm in diameter, with a cylindrical tube, and small scales alternating with the petals. The anthers are exserted with the anthers surpassing the faucal scales. The nutlets are 2.2 mm long by 1 mm wide. Flowering and fruiting occur in January.

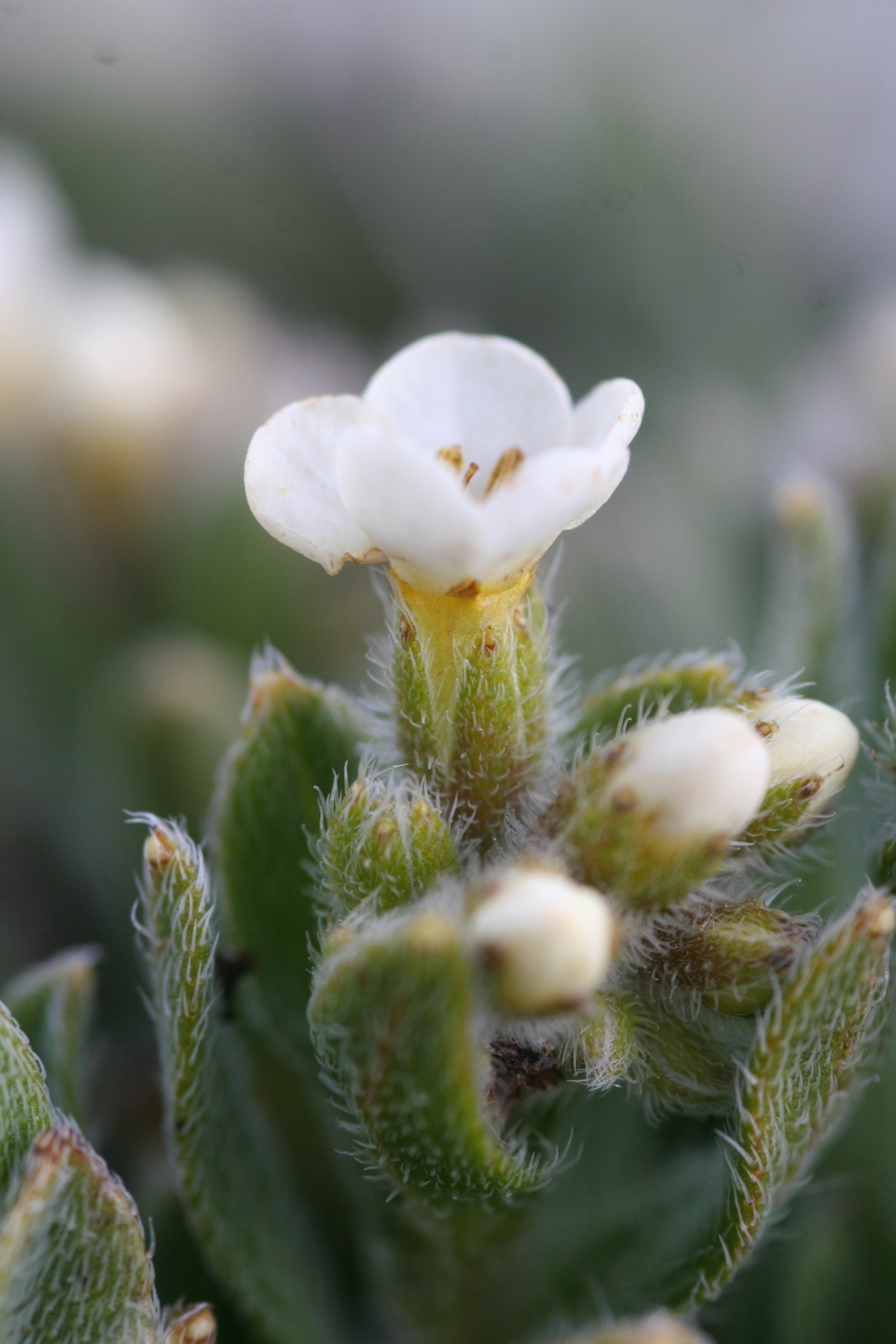
Floral detail

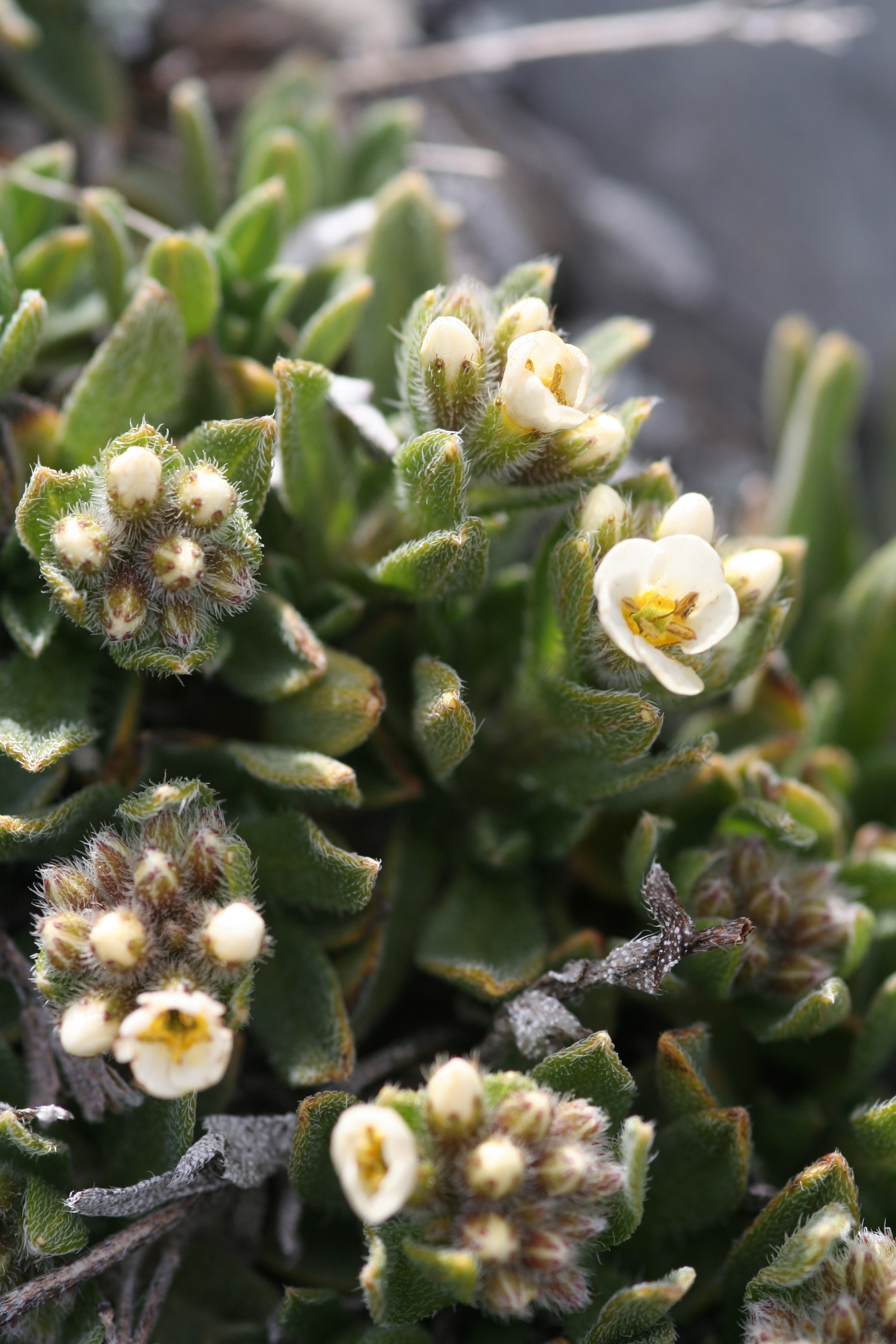
Partially in bud

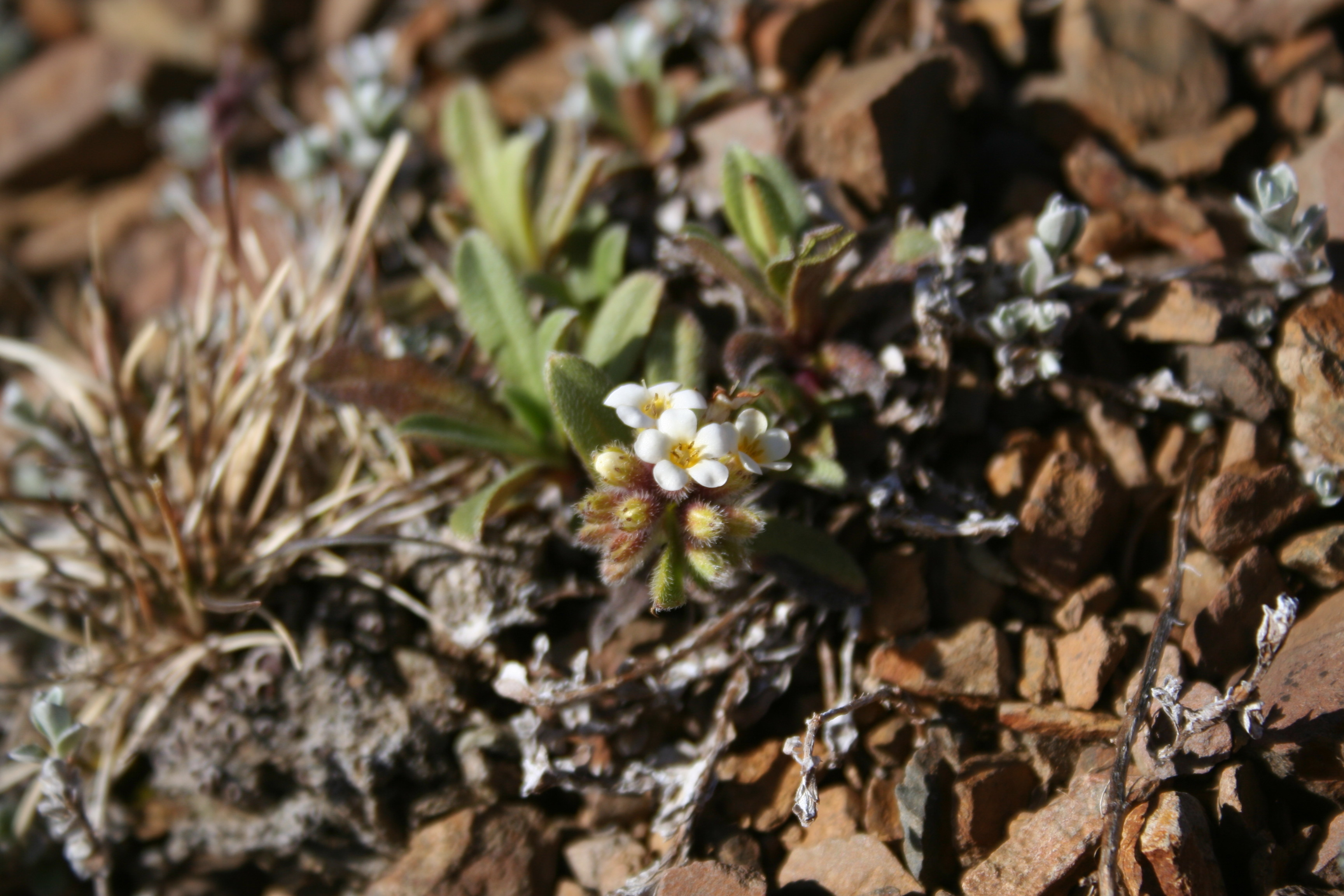
Growth habit

== Taxonomy and etymology ==
M. angustata Cheeseman is in the plant family Boraginaceae. It was originally described by New Zealand botanist Thomas Cheeseman in his Manual of the New Zealand Flora in 1906. The most recent treatment of this species was done by Lucy B. Moore in the Flora of New Zealand.

The original specimens (syntypes) of this species were collected by Cheeseman in "Mt Arthur Plateau and Raglan Mountains", South Island, New Zealand. The specimens collected by Cheeseman are housed at the herbarium of the Auckland War Memorial Museum (AK).

Cheeseman noted that M. angustata is morphologically very similar to M. traversii, distinguishing them by M. angustata's narrower leaves and relatively longer anthers, among other differences.

=== Phylogeny ===
Two individuals of M. angustata have been included in phylogenetic analyses of standard DNA sequencing markers (nuclear ribosomal DNA and chloroplast DNA regions) of New Zealand Myosotis. Within the southern hemisphere lineage, species relationships, including those of the two individual sequenced of M. angustata, were not well resolved.

== Distribution and habitat ==
M. angustata is a forget-me-not originally collected from Mt Arthur and Raglan Range, in the northern part of the South Island, New Zealand. It is currently considered to be extant only in Kahurangi National Park.

== Conservation status ==
M. angustata is listed as Threatened – Nationally Critical with the qualifiers Data Poor (DP) and Range Restricted (RR) on the most recent assessment (2017-2018) under the New Zealand Threatened Classification system for plants.
