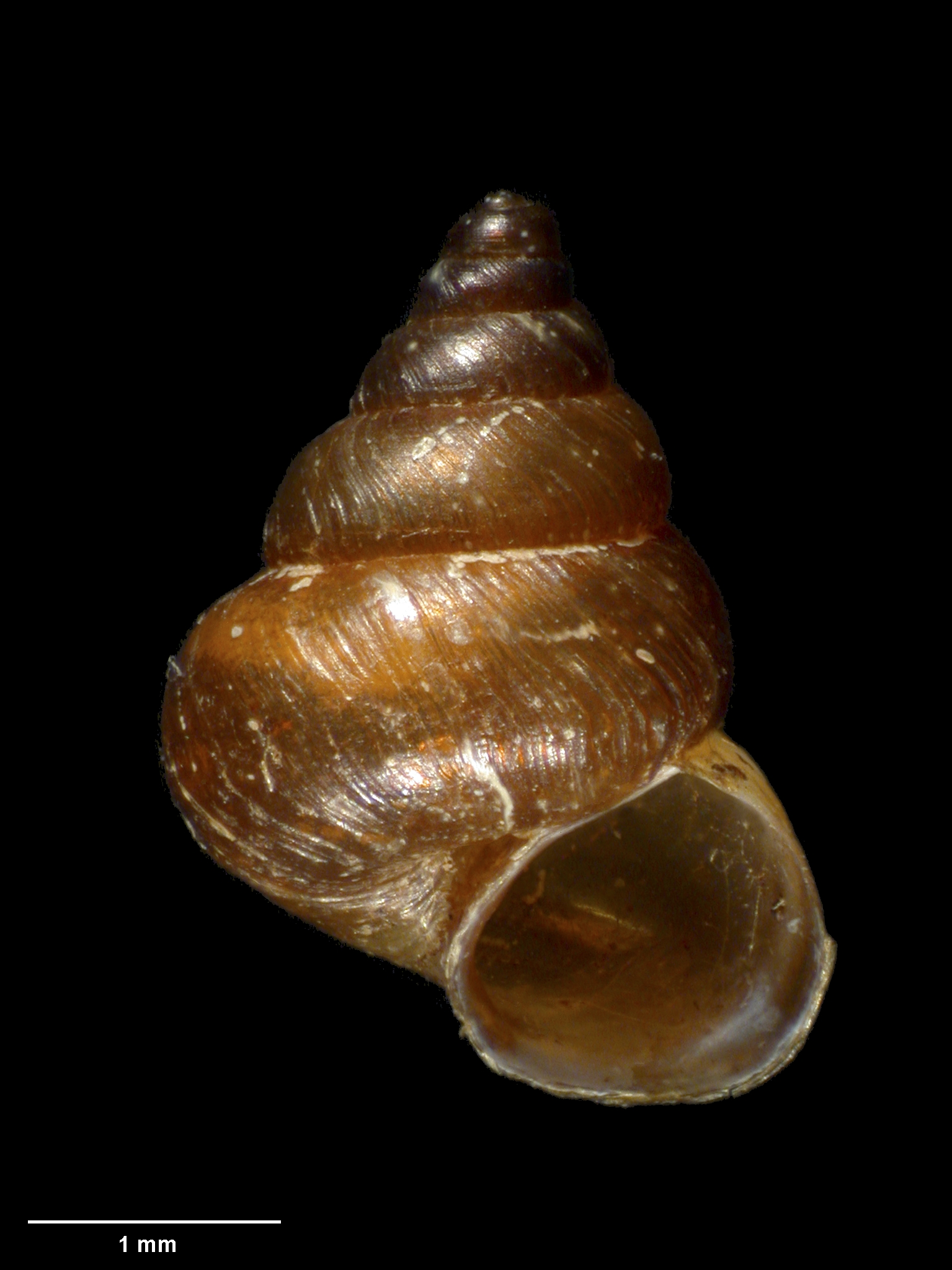

Scientific classification
- Kingdom: Animalia
- Phylum: Mollusca
- Class: Gastropoda
- Subclass: Caenogastropoda
- Order: Architaenioglossa
- Family: Pupinidae
- Genus: Cytora
- Species: C. kahurangi

Binomial name
- Cytora kahurangi Marshall & Barker, 2007

= Cytora kahurangi =

Species of gastropod

Cytora kahurangi is a species of land snail that is endemic to New Zealand.

== Description ==
The height of the shell grows up to 3.30–4.10 millimetres (0.130–0.161 in) and has a larger height than width, with a height/width ratio of 1.35–1.47.

== Range ==
Cytora kahurangi is found in the northwestern South Island, including in Kahurangi National Park.

== Etymology ==
The species was named after Kahurangi National Park.

== Taxonomy ==
The holotype is stored at the Te Papa Museum under registration number M.179671.

== See also ==
- List of non-marine molluscs of New Zealand
