= Carex impexa =

Scientific classification
- Kingdom: Plantae
- Clade: Embryophytes
- Clade: Tracheophytes
- Clade: Spermatophytes
- Clade: Angiosperms
- Clade: Monocots
- Clade: Commelinids
- Order: Poales
- Family: Cyperaceae
- Genus: Carex
- Species: C. impexa

Binomial name
- Carex impexa K.A.Ford

Species of grass-like plant

Carex impexa is a perennial sedge of the Cyperaceae family that is native to the South Island of New Zealand.

== Description ==
The species has a tufted habit with short rhizomes that are up to 35 mm (1.4 in) in length and typically have a diameter of 1 to 1.5 mm (0.039 to 0.059 in). The ascending to spreading culms have a green to bronze to red coloration and are 14 to 900 mm (0.55 to 35.43 in) long and 1 to 1.6 mm (0.039 to 0.063 in) in diameter. It has dull brown loose fitting leaf sheaths that are shed as the plants ages. The stiff and recurved leaves are in triangular cross-section and taper to a point, the leaves are 45 to 260 mm (1.8 to 10.2 in) in length and 1.5 to 3.6 mm (0.059 to 0.142 in) wide. The sedge will produce three to five erect brown coloured inflorescences around November and then fruit between January and March.

== Distribution ==
C. impexa is endemic to a small area on the South Island of New Zealand. It is situated in an area around north west of Nelson in the Kahurangi National Park from the Pikikiruna Range south to the Matiri Range. It is typically found growing on weathered limestone on marble or calcereous mudstone or siltstone as a part of grassland or forested communities.

== Conservation Status ==
In 2009 and 2012, according to the New Zealand Threat Classification System, the plant was listed as at risk and as naturally uncommon.

== See also ==
- List of Carex species
