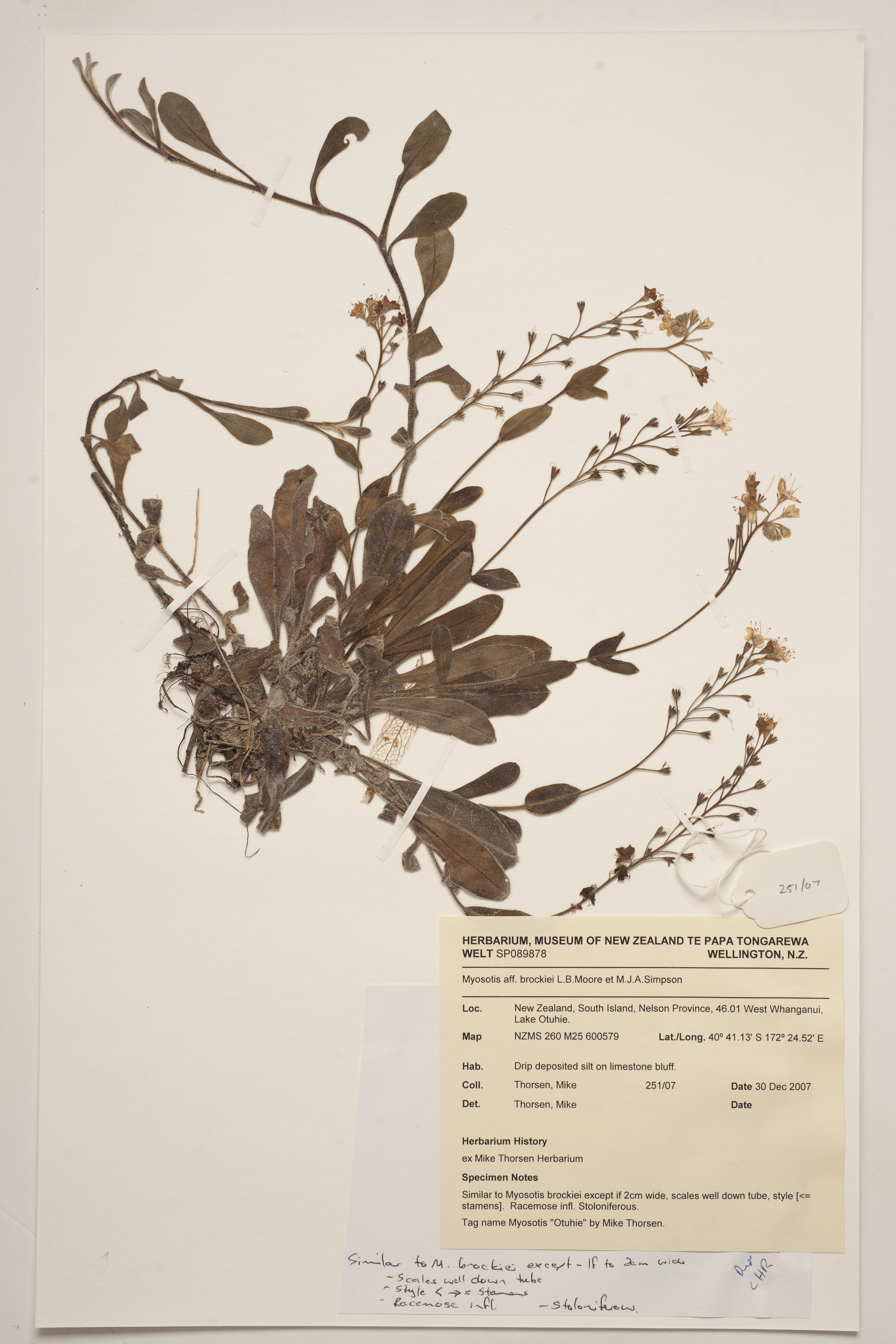
- Holotype specimen from Te Papa

Conservation status
- Nationally Vulnerable (NZ TCS)

Scientific classification
- Kingdom: Plantae
- Clade: Tracheophytes
- Clade: Angiosperms
- Clade: Eudicots
- Clade: Asterids
- Order: Boraginales
- Family: Boraginaceae
- Genus: Myosotis
- Species: M. brockiei
- Subspecies: M. b. subsp. dysis

Trinomial name
- Myosotis brockiei subsp. dysis Courtney & Meudt

= Myosotis brockiei subsp. dysis =

Species of flowering plant

Myosotis brockiei subsp. dysis is a subspecies of flowering plant in the family Boraginaceae, endemic to southern South Island of New Zealand. Shannel Courtney and Heidi Meudt described this subspecies in 2021. Plants of this subspecies of forget-me-not are perennial rosettes which form stoloniferous mats, with long, ebracteate, erect inflorescences, and white corollas with exserted stamens.

== Taxonomy and etymology ==
Myosotis brockiei subsp. dysis Courtney & Meudt is in the plant family Boraginaceae. The species M. brockiei was described by Lucy Moore and Margaret Simpson in 1973, whereas the subspecies dysis was described in 2021.

The holotype specimen of Myosotis brockiei subsp. dysis was collected from Lake Otuhie, Western Nelson, by Michael Thorsen and is housed at the herbarium of the Museum of New Zealand Te Papa Tongarewa (WELT SP089878). There are also isotypes at Manaaki Whenua - Landcare Research Allan Herbarium (CHR 596689/A and CHR 596689/B).

The subspecies name dysis is one of the Greek Horae (hours) or daughters of Chronos (time), and is in reference to the west, where the sun sets, reflecting the western distribution of this subspecies relative to the other subspecies.

This is one of two subspecies recognized in M. brockiei; the other is M. brockiei subsp. brockiei. The subspecies are allopatric, as M. brockiei subsp. dysis is found in lower elevations near the coast on limestone or other calcicolous substrates, whereas M. brockiei subsp. brockiei is found at higher elevations in montane and subalpine in habitats with limestone or other calcicolous or ultramafic substrates. Myosotis brockiei subsp. dysis differs from M. brockiei subsp. brockiei by three minor characters, i.e. its habit (stoloniferous mats instead of single rosettes or tufts instead), obtuse apices of the lower cauline leaves, and lack of retrorse (backward facing) hairs on the scape below the flowering portion of the inflorescence.

== Phylogeny ==
Myosotis brockiei subsp. dysis has not yet been included in any phylogenetic analyses.

== Description ==
Habitat

Myosotis brockiei subsp. brockiei plants are single rosettes that often grow together to form stoloniferous mats. The rosette leaves have petioles 16–41 mm long. The rosette leaf blades are usually 15–50mm long by 4–20 mm wide (length: width ratio 2.5–3.6: 1), oblanceolate or rarely narrowly obovate, widest at or above the middle, with an obtuse apex. The upper surface of the leaf is densely covered in mostly flexuous, some curved, patent to erect, antrorse (forward-facing) hairs that are oriented oblique to the mid vein. The hairs on the edges are similar but mostly erect, and the hairs on the underside of the leaf are also similar but mostly retrorse (backward-facing) and can be oriented parallel or oblique to the mid vein. Each rosette has 1–6 erect, usually once-branched (sometimes unbranched), ebracteate inflorescences that are up to 385 mm long and are bifurcating in an open, forked 'V' shape near the tips. The cauline leaves are similar to the rosette leaves but smaller with shorter petioles, and decrease in size toward the tip. Each inflorescence has up to 47 flowers, each borne on a pedicel up to 13 mm long at fruiting, and each without a bract. The scape below the flowering portion of the inflorescence has hairs that are antrorse to erect (with some retrorse only at the very base). The calyx is 2–7 mm long at flowering and 3–9 mm long at fruiting, lobed to half to three-quarters of its length, and densely covered in mostly antrorse (retrorse near the base), mostly patent and flexuous hairs. The corolla is white, up to 13 mm in diameter, with a cylindrical tube, petals that are narrowly ovate, obovate or broadly obovate, and small yellow scales alternating with the petals. The anthers are fully exserted above the scales. The four smooth, shiny, light to dark brown nutlets are 1.8–2.5 mm long by 1.0–1.3 mm wide and narrowly ovoid or ovoid in shape.

The chromosome number of M. brockiei subsp. dysis is unknown.

The pollen of M. brockiei subsp. dysis is unknown.

It flowers and fruits from December–January.

== Distribution and habitat ==
Myosotis brockiei subsp. dysis is a forget-me-not subspecies endemic to Western Nelson, South Island, New Zealand from 0–260 m ASL. It is found on faces or ledges of limestone cliffs, on sites with a lowland climate near the coast, and is considered to be an obligate calcicole.

== Conservation status ==
The species is listed as Threatened - Nationally Vulnerable on the most recent assessment (2017-2018; as Myosotis aff. brockiei (a) (CHR 497375; Lake Otuhie)) under the New Zealand Threatened Classification system for plants, with the qualifier "OL" (One Location).
