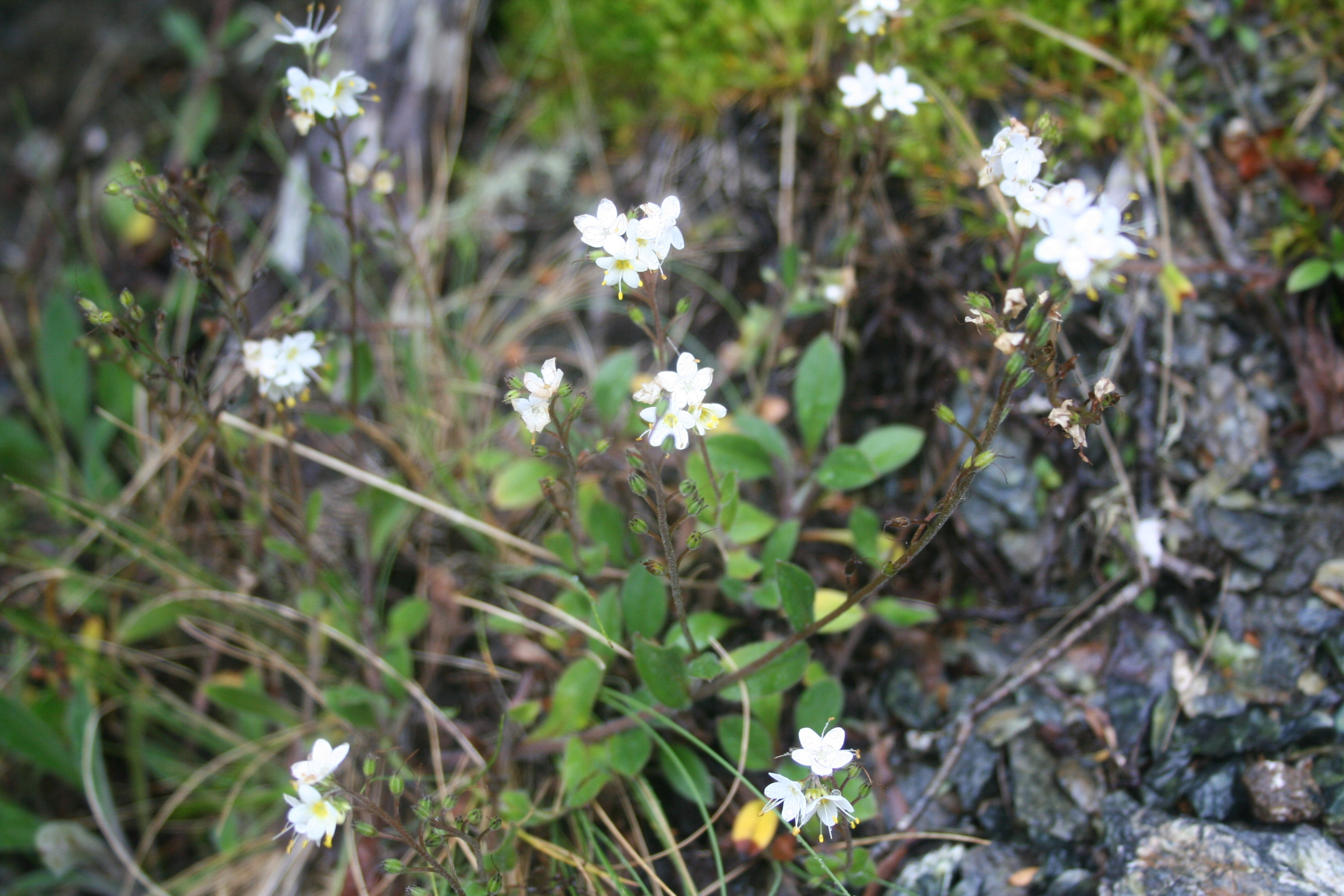

Conservation status
- Naturally Uncommon (NZ TCS)

Scientific classification
- Kingdom: Plantae
- Clade: Tracheophytes
- Clade: Angiosperms
- Clade: Eudicots
- Clade: Asterids
- Order: Boraginales
- Family: Boraginaceae
- Genus: Myosotis
- Species: M. brockiei

Binomial name
- Myosotis brockiei L.B.Moore & M.J.A. Simpson

Subspecies
- M. brockiei subsp. brockiei; M. brockiei subsp. dysis

= Myosotis brockiei =

Species of flowering plant

Myosotis brockiei is a species of flowering plant in the family Boraginaceae, endemic to southern South Island of New Zealand. Lucy Moore and Margaret J.A. Simpson described the species in 1973. Plants of this species of forget-me-not are perennial rosettes which form loose tufts or clumps, with ebracteate, erect inflorescences, and white corollas with exserted stamens.

== Description ==
M. brockiei plants are single rosettes that often grow together to form loose tufts or clumps, and can be stoloniferous. The rosette leaves have petioles 3–72 mm long. The rosette leaf blades are usually 15–67 mm long by 2–20 mm wide (length: width ratio 2.1–4.9: 1), usually narrowly elliptic, elliptic, oblanceolate or narrowly obovate, widest at or above the middle (rarely below the middle), with an acute or obtuse apex. The upper surface of the leaf is densely covered in mostly flexuous, some curved, patent to erect, antrorse (forward-facing) hairs that are oriented oblique to the mid vein. The hairs on the edges are similar but mostly erect, and the hairs on the underside of the leaf are also similar but mostly retrorse (backward-facing) and can be oriented parallel or oblique to the mid vein. Each rosette has 1–6 erect, usually once-branched (sometimes unbranched), ebracteate inflorescences that are up to 385 mm long and are usually bifurcating in an open, forked 'V' shape near the tips. The cauline leaves are similar to the rosette leaves but smaller with shorter petioles, and decrease in size toward the tip. Each inflorescence has up to 47 flowers, each borne on a pedicel up to 13 mm long at fruiting, and each without a bract.

The calyx is 2–7 mm long at flowering and 3–9 mm long at fruiting, lobed to half to three-quarters of its length, and densely covered in mostly antrorse (retrorse near the base), mostly patent and flexuous hairs. The corolla is white, up to 13 mm in diameter, with a cylindrical tube, petals that are narrowly ovate, obovate or broadly obovate, and small yellow scales alternating with the petals. The anthers are fully exserted above the scales. The four smooth, shiny, light to dark brown nutlets are 1.8–2.5 mm long by 1.0–1.3 mm wide and narrowly ovoid or ovoid in shape. It flowers and fruits from November–February.

== Taxonomy and etymology ==
Myosotis brockiei is in the plant family Boraginaceae and was described by Lucy Moore and Margaret J.A. Simpson. It is morphologically similar to other ebracteate-erect species, especially another species also endemic the Western Nelson area on the South Island, Myosotis concinna. In fact, prior to the description of M. brockiei, several botanists, including Thomas Cheeseman and Lucy Moore, included it within the circumscription of M. concinna.

In the paper describing M. brockiei, the authors distinguish M. brockiei from M. concinna by its longer infructescences, a calyx that is longer than the corolla tube, corolla lobes that are small and ovate, and corollas that are white and non-fragrant, and smaller, ovoid and lighter colored nutlets. A more recent study showed that there are four characters that can distinguish Myosotis brockiei from M. concinna, i.e. white corollas, and hairs on the rosette leaves that are erect on the margins, oriented oblique to the mid vein on the underside of the blade, and oriented perpendicular to the mid vein on the midvein itself on the underside of the leaf.

The holotype specimen of Myosotis brockiei was collected from Gorge of the Cobb River, Western Nelson, South Island, New Zealand by W.B. Brockie and is lodged at Manaaki Whenua - Landcare Research Allan Herbarium (CHR 233859/A), where there is also an isotype (CHR 233860). The specific epithet, brockiei, honors the collector of the type specimen, Walter Boa Brockie (1897–1972) who was a New Zealand botanist and horticulturist.

=== Subspecies ===
Two subspecies are recognized: Myosotis brockiei subsp. brockiei and M. brockiei subsp. dysis. The subspecies are allopatric, and can be distinguished from one another based on habit, hairs on the scape, and rosette leaf apex shape.

=== Phylogeny ===
M. brockiei was shown to be a part of the monophyletic southern hemisphere lineage of Myosotis in phylogenetic analyses of standard DNA sequencing markers (nuclear ribosomal DNA and chloroplast DNA regions). Within the southern hemisphere lineage, species relationships were not well resolved. The sequenced individuals of M. brockiei (between one and five individuals depending on DNA marker and analyses) grouped with each other and with other ebracteate-erect species from the same geographical area (Western Nelson) in the nuclear ribosomal DNA analyses, forming two groups in the chloroplast DNA analyses.

== Distribution and habitat ==
M. brockiei is a forget-me-not endemic to coastal to subalpine Western Nelson, South Island, New Zealand from 0–1220 m above sea level. It is found on rocks, ledges, faces of cliffs, or outcrops, on limestone or other calcicolous substrates, or on ultramafics.

== Conservation status ==
The species is listed as At Risk - Naturally Uncommon on the most recent assessment (2017-2018) under the New Zealand Threatened Classification system for plants, with the qualifier "RR" (Range Restricted).
