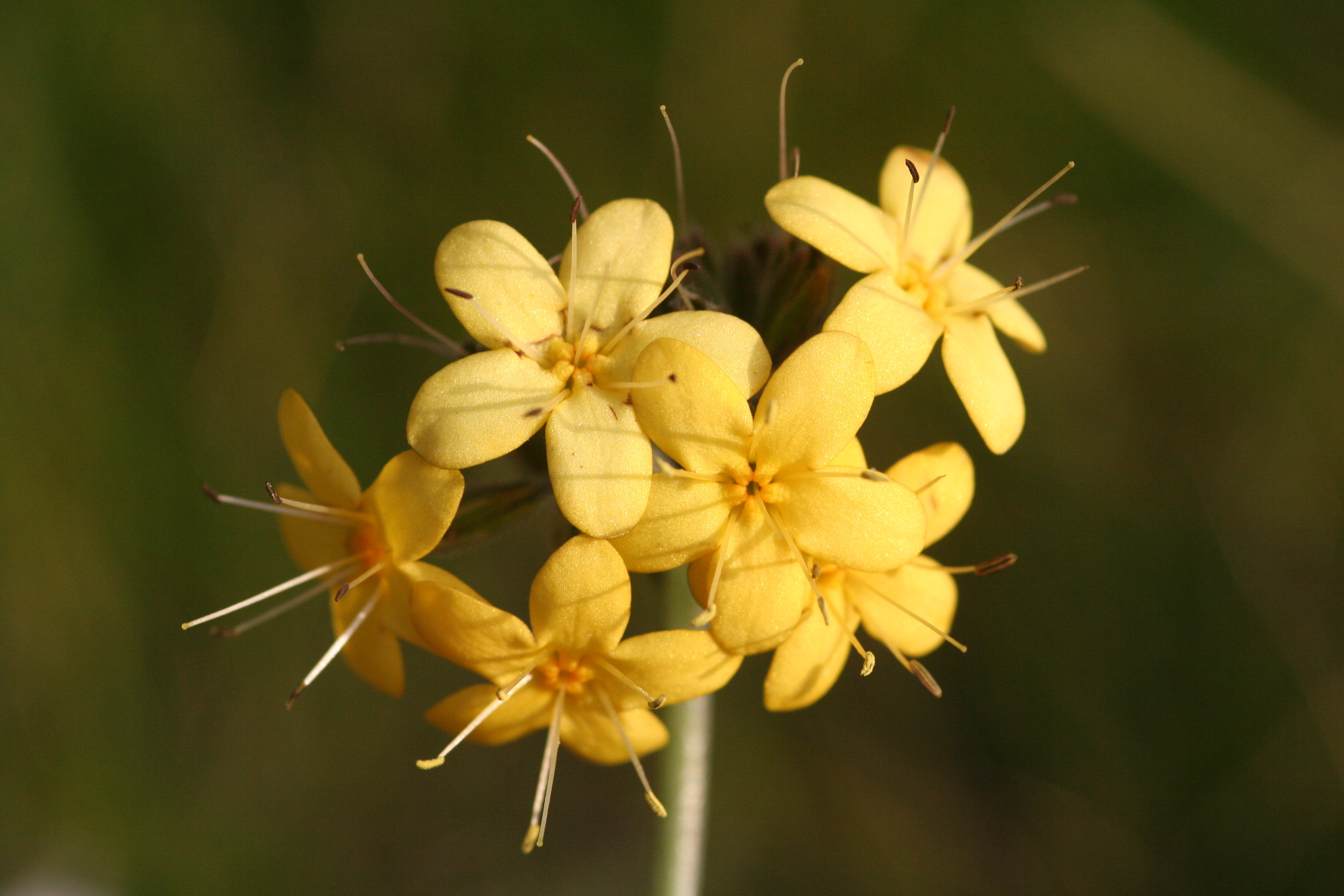
- Myosotis concinna flowers

Conservation status
- Naturally Uncommon (NZ TCS)

Scientific classification
- Kingdom: Plantae
- Clade: Tracheophytes
- Clade: Angiosperms
- Clade: Eudicots
- Clade: Asterids
- Order: Boraginales
- Family: Boraginaceae
- Genus: Myosotis
- Species: M. concinna

Binomial name
- Myosotis concinna Cheeseman, 1885

= Myosotis concinna =

Species of flowering plant

Myosotis concinna is a species of flowering plant in the family Boraginaceae, endemic to the South Island of New Zealand. Thomas Cheeseman described the species in 1885. Plants of this species of forget-me-not are large, perennial rosettes which form loose tufts or clumps, with ebracteate, erect inflorescences, and yellow corollas.

== Taxonomy and etymology ==
Myosotis concinna is in the plant family Boraginaceae and was described in 1885 by Thomas Cheeseman.

Myosotis concinna is morphologically similar to two other ebracteate-erect species, the northern South Island endemic M. brockiei, and the Australian endemic M. exarrhena. M. concinna can be distinguished from M. brockiei by its yellow corollas (vs. white in M. brockiei), hairs appressed (vs. erect) on the margins, and hairs parallel to the mid vein on the upper and lower surfaces of the leaf (vs. oblique or perpendicular).

The lectotype specimen of Myosotis concinna was collected by Thomas Cheeseman from Mt Owen, Western Nelson and is lodged at the Auckland War Memorial Museum Herbarium (AK 7549). There is also an isolectotype at the Museum of New Zealand Te Papa Tongarewa (WELT SP002360).

The specific epithet, concinna, is derived from the Latin concinnus meaning elegant, pretty or neat.

== Phylogeny ==
Myosotis concinna was shown to be a part of the monophyletic southern hemisphere lineage of Myosotis in phylogenetic analyses of standard DNA sequencing markers (nuclear ribosomal DNA and chloroplast DNA regions). Within the southern hemisphere lineage, species relationships, including those of the sole individual sequenced of M. concinna, were not well resolved.

== Description ==
Myosotis concinna plants are single rosettes that often grow together to form loose tufts or clumps. The rosette leaves have petioles 5–48 mm long. The rosette leaf blades are 16–59 mm long by 4–15 mm wide (length: width ratio 2.2–6.2: 1), usually lanceolate or narrowly lanceolate, usually widest at or above the middle, with an acute apex. The upper surface of the leaf are densely covered in mostly flexuous, appressed to patent, antrorse (forward-facing) hairs that are usually oriented parallel to the mid vein. The hairs on the edge of the leaves are similar but always appressed, and the hairs on the underside of the leaf are similar but mostly retrorse (backward-facing). Each rosette has 1–4 erect, branched, ebracteate inflorescences that are up to 300 mm long and are bifurcating in a forked 'V' shape at the tips. The cauline leaves are similar to the rosette leaves but smaller, and decrease in size toward the tip. Each inflorescence has up to 40 flowers, each borne on a pedicel up to 7 mm long at fruiting, and each without a bract. The calyx is 4–6 mm long at flowering and 6–9 mm long at fruiting, lobed to half or three-quarters its length, and densely covered in antrorse, flexuous or curved, mostly patent hairs, some of which are retrorse. The corolla is yellow (rarely grey blue or purple), up to 16 mm in diameter, with a cylindrical tube, flat petals that are obovate, broadly obovate or very broadly obovate, and small scales alternating with the petals. The anthers are fully exserted above the scales. The four smooth, shiny, medium to dark brown nutlets are 2.0–3.3 mm long by 0.9–1.7 mm wide and narrowly ovoid in shape.

The chromosome number of M. concinna is unknown.

The pollen of M. concinna is unknown.

It flowers and fruits from November–January, with the main flowering and fruiting period in January.

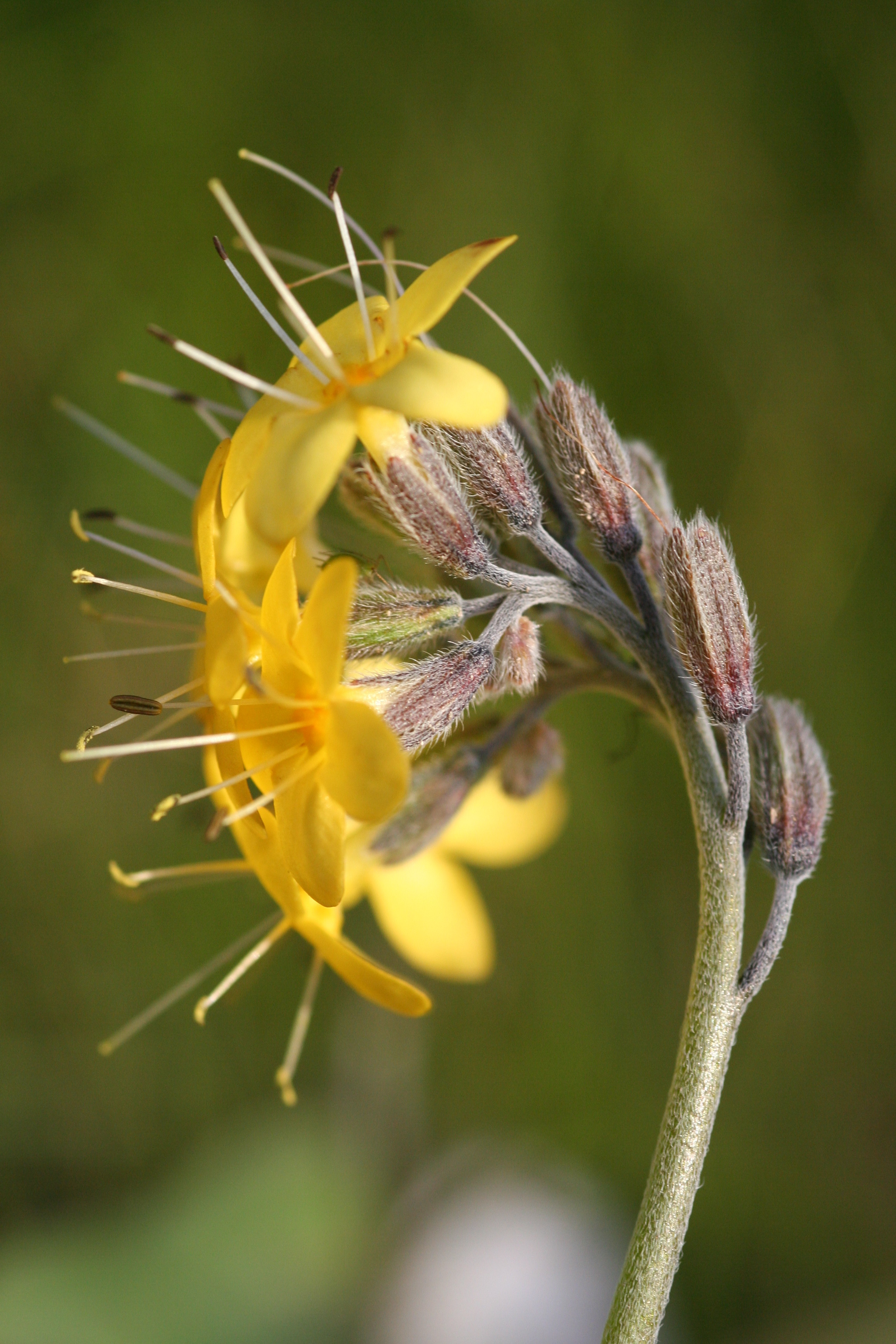
Floral detail

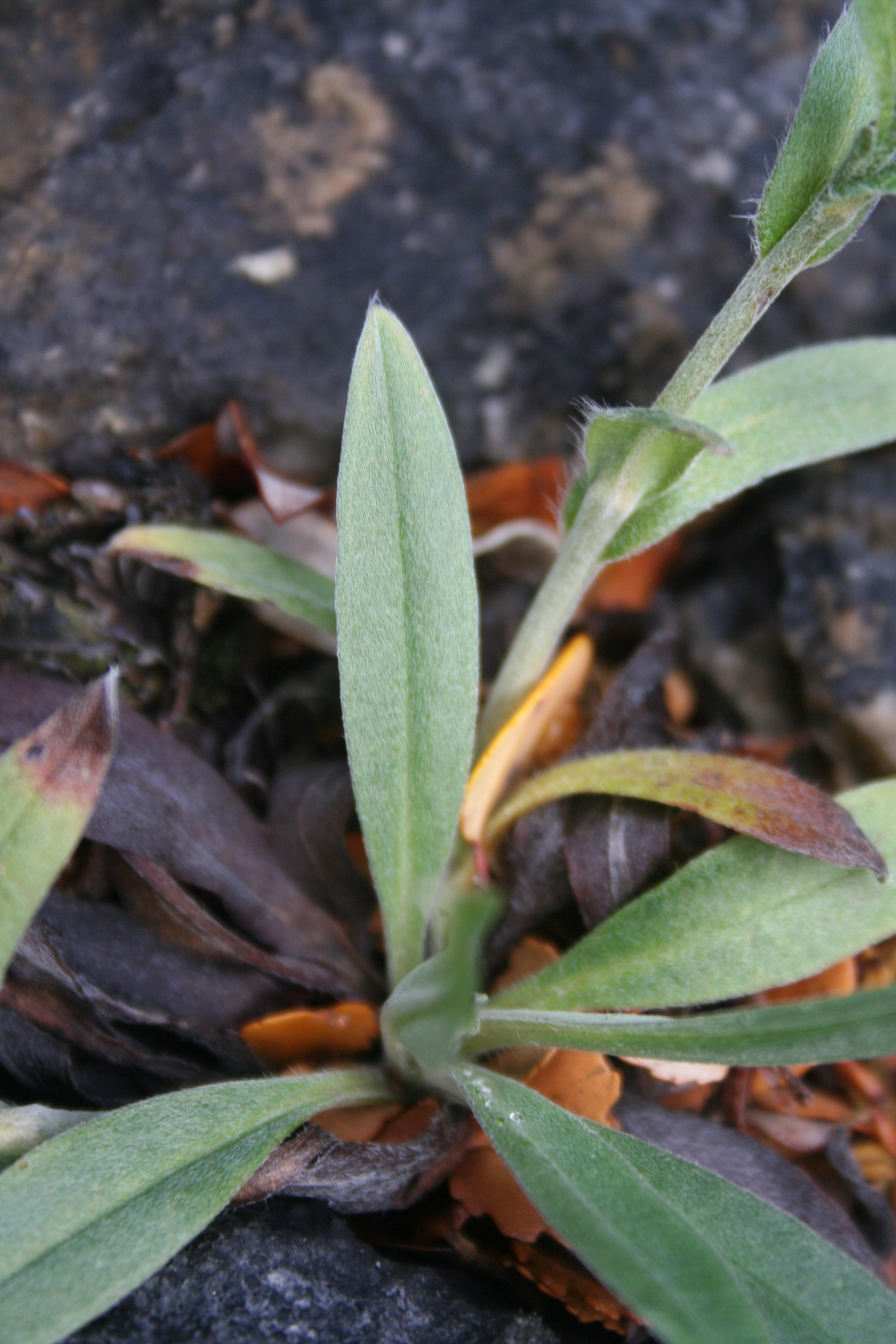
Rosette leaves

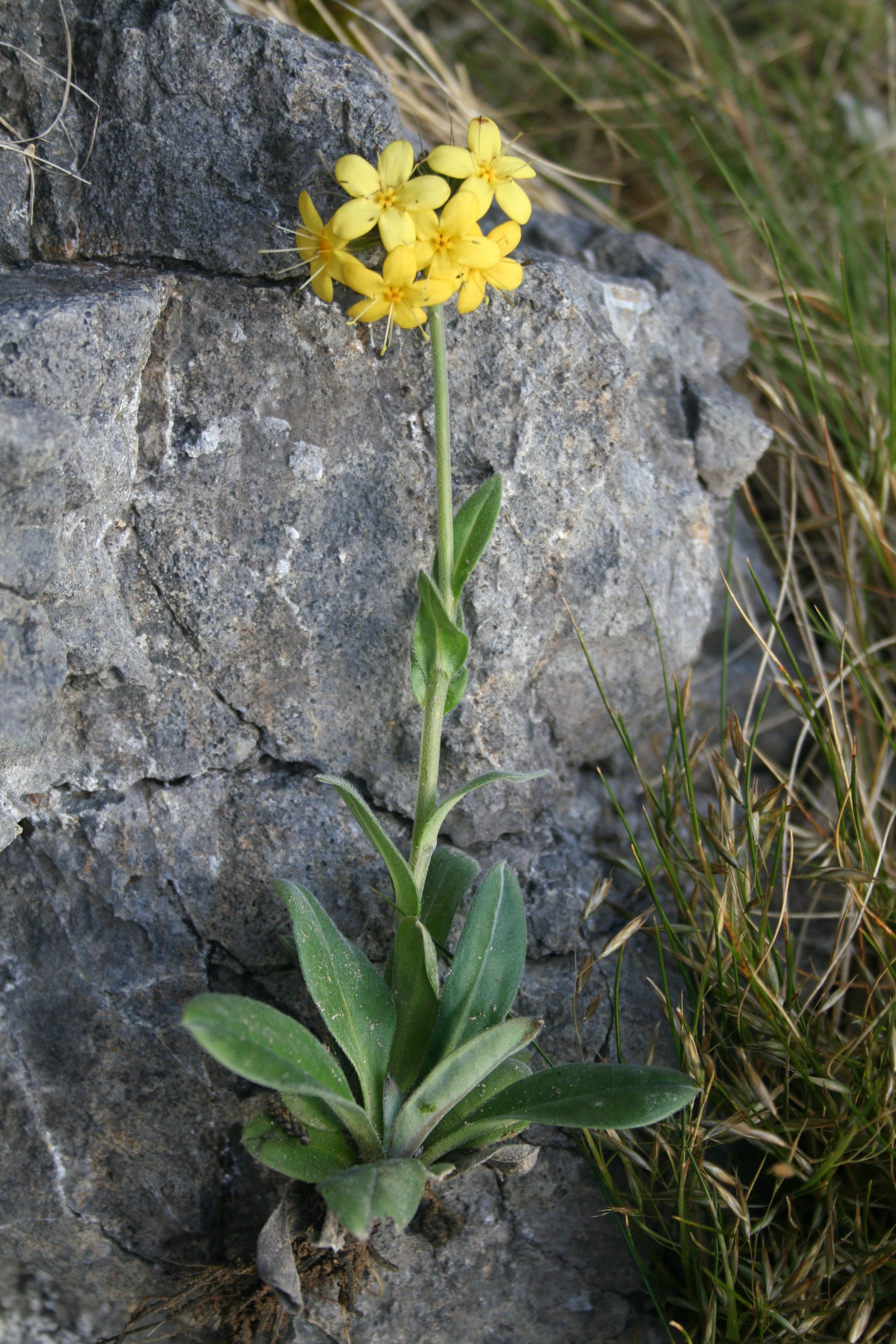
Flowering individual

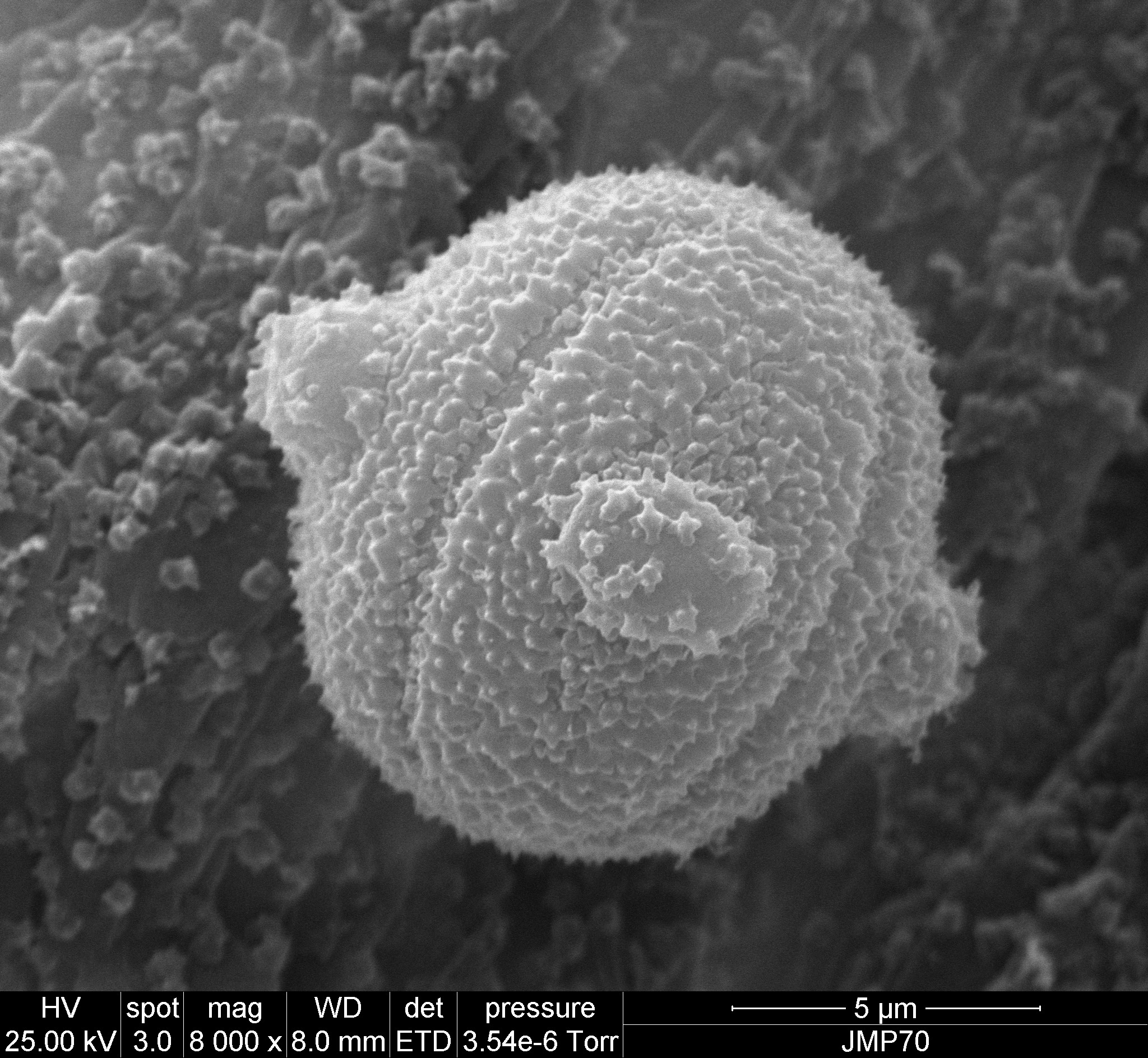
Pollen grain

== Distribution and habitat ==
Myosotis concinna is a forget-me-not endemic to the Owen Range, Kahurangi National Park, Western Nelson, South Island of New Zealand from 1050 to 1700 m ASL. It is an obligate calcicole found in south-facing marble bluffs and scree in southern beech forest or above treeline.

== Conservation status ==
The species is listed as At Risk - Naturally Uncommon on the most recent assessment (2017-2018) under the New Zealand Threatened Classification system for plants, with the qualifier "RR" (Range Restricted).
