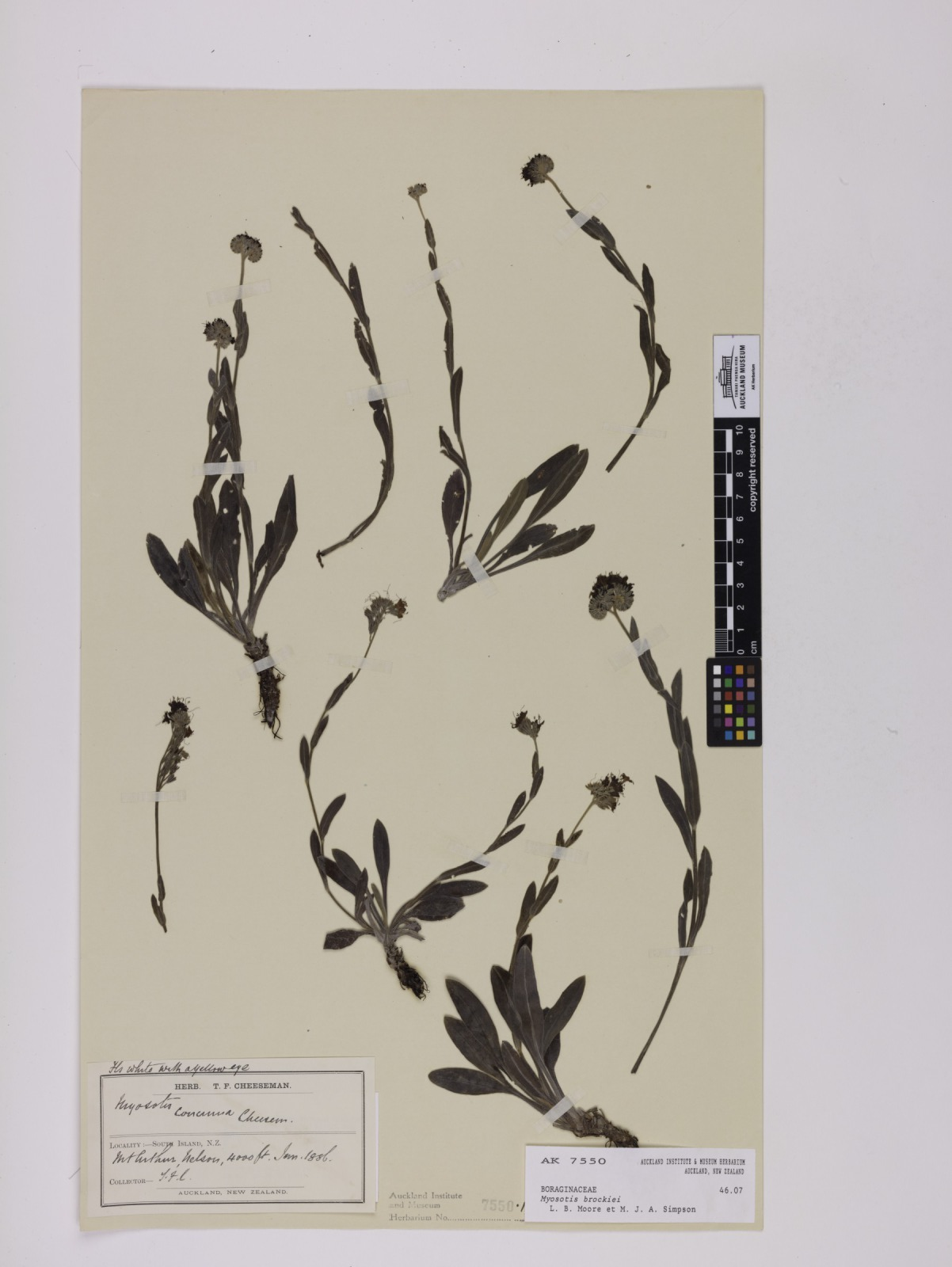
- Herbarium specimen of Myosotis brockiei subsp. brockiei from AK herbarium

Conservation status
- Naturally Uncommon (NZ TCS)

Scientific classification
- Kingdom: Plantae
- Clade: Tracheophytes
- Clade: Angiosperms
- Clade: Eudicots
- Clade: Asterids
- Order: Boraginales
- Family: Boraginaceae
- Genus: Myosotis
- Species: M. brockiei
- Subspecies: M. b. subsp. brockiei

Trinomial name
- Myosotis brockiei subsp. brockiei L.B.Moore & M.J.A. Simpson

= Myosotis brockiei subsp. brockiei =

Species of flowering plant

Myosotis brockiei subsp. brockiei is a subspecies of flowering plant in the family Boraginaceae, endemic to southern South Island of New Zealand. Lucy Moore and Margaret Simpson described M. brockiei in 1973. Plants of this subspecies of forget-me-not are perennial rosettes which form caespitose tufts or clumps, with ebracteate, erect inflorescences, and white corollas with exserted stamens.

== Taxonomy and etymology ==
Myosotis brockiei L.B.Moore & M.J.A.Simpson subsp. brockiei is in the plant family Boraginaceae. The species M. brockiei was described by Lucy Moore and Margaret Simpson in 1973.

The holotype specimen of Myosotis brockiei was collected from Gorge of the Cobb River, Western Nelson, South Island, New Zealand by W.B. Brockie and is lodged at Manaaki Whenua - Landcare Research Allan Herbarium (CHR 233859/A), where there is also an isotype (CHR 233860).

The specific epithet, brockiei, honors the collector of the type specimen, Walter Boa Brockie (1897–1972) who was a New Zealand botanist and horticulturist.

This is one of two subspecies recognized in M. brockiei; the other is M. brockiei subsp. dysis. The subspecies are allopatric, as M. brockiei subsp. brockiei is found at higher elevations in montane and subalpine in habitats with limestone or other calcicolous or ultramafic substrates, whereas M. brockiei subsp. dysis is found in lower elevations near the coast on limestone or other calcicolous substrates. Myosotis brockiei subsp. brockiei differs from M. brockiei subsp. dysis by three minor characters, i.e. its habit (single rosettes or tufts instead of stoloniferous mats), acute apices of the lower cauline leaves, and presence of retrorse hairs on the scape below the flowering portion of the inflorescence.

== Phylogeny ==
Myosotis brockiei subsp. brockiei was shown to be a part of the monophyletic southern hemisphere lineage of Myosotis in phylogenetic analyses of standard DNA sequencing markers (nuclear ribosomal DNA and chloroplast DNA regions). Within the southern hemisphere lineage, species relationships were not well resolved. The sequenced individuals of M. brockiei subsp. brockiei (between one and five individuals depending on DNA marker and analyses, all identified to species level only as "M. brockiei") grouped with each other and with other ebracteate-erect species from the same geographical area (Western Nelson) in the nuclear ribosomal DNA analyses, forming two groups in the chloroplast DNA analyses.

== Description ==
Myosotis brockiei subsp. brockiei plants are single rosettes that often grow together to form caespitose tufts or clumps. The rosette leaves have petioles 3–72 mm long. The rosette leaf blades are usually 15–67 mm long by 2–17 mm wide (length: width ratio 2.1–4.9: 1), usually narrowly elliptic, elliptic, narrowly oblanceolate, oblanceolate or narrowly obovate, widest at or above the middle (rarely below the middle), with an acute apex. The upper surface of the leaf are densely covered in mostly flexuous, some curved, patent to erect, antrorse (forward-facing) hairs that are oriented oblique to the mid vein. The hairs on the edges are similar but mostly erect, and the hairs on the underside of the leaf are also similar but mostly retrorse (backward-facing) and can be oriented parallel or oblique to the mid vein. Each rosette has 1–6 erect, usually once-branched (sometimes unbranched), ebracteate inflorescences that are up to 385 mm long and are bifurcating in an open, forked 'V' shape near the tips. The cauline leaves are similar to the rosette leaves but smaller with shorter petioles, and decrease in size toward the tip. Each inflorescence has up to 47 flowers, each borne on a pedicel up to 13 mm long at fruiting, and each without a bract. The scape below the flowering portion of the inflorescence has hairs that are patent and retrorse. The calyx is 2–7 mm long at flowering and 3–9 mm long at fruiting, lobed to half to three-quarters of its length, and densely covered in mostly antrorse (retrorse near the base), mostly patent and flexuous hairs. The corolla is white, up to 13 mm in diameter, with a cylindrical tube, petals that are narrowly ovate, obovate or broadly obovate, and small yellow scales alternating with the petals. The anthers are fully exserted above the scales. The four smooth, shiny, light to dark brown nutlets are 1.8–2.5 mm long by 1.0–1.3 mm wide and narrowly ovoid or ovoid in shape.

The chromosome number of M. brockiei subsp. brockiei is unknown.

The pollen of M. brockiei subsp. brockiei is unknown.

It flowers and fruits from November–February, with flowering mainly occurring from November–January and fruiting mainly from December–February.

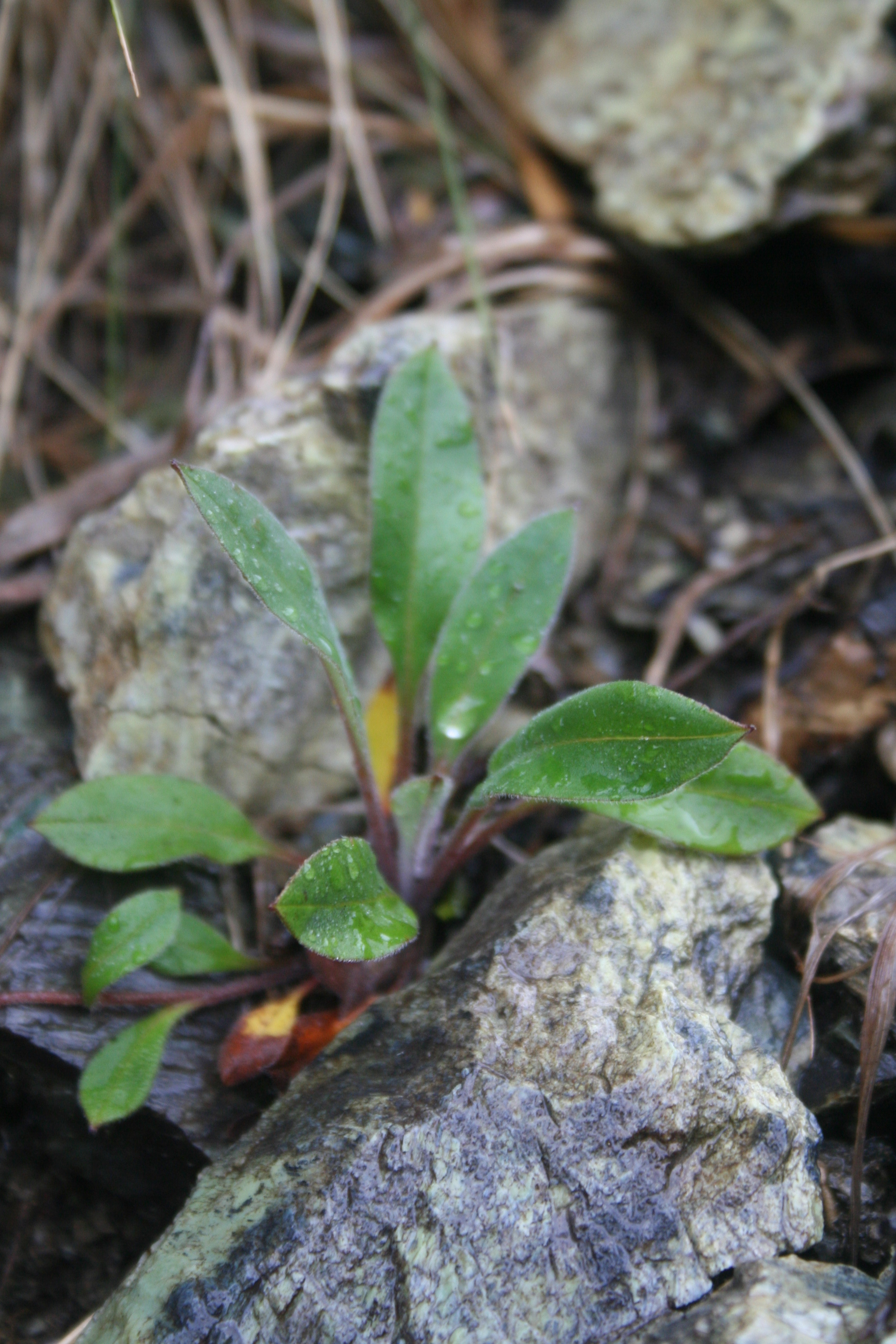
Rosette leaves

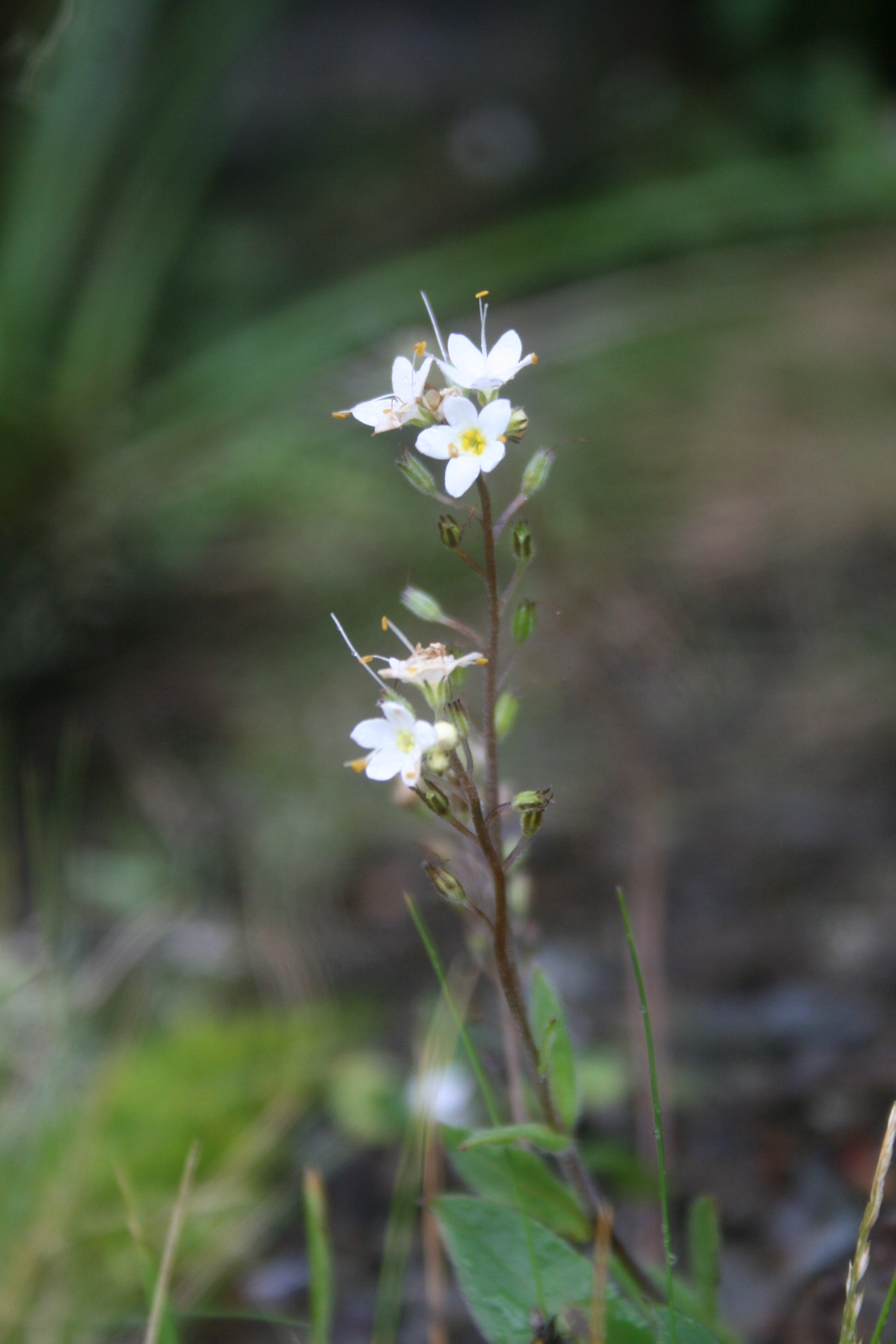
Inflorescences

== Distribution and habitat ==
Myosotis brockiei subsp. brockiei is a forget-me-not subspecies endemic to subalpine Western Nelson, South Island, New Zealand usually from 790 to 1220 m ASL. It is found on rocks, rubble, bluffs, cliffs, outcrops, or steep river banks, on limestone or other lime-rich substrates, or on ultramafics. This subspecies is considered to be a facultative calcicole.

== Conservation status ==
The species is listed as At Risk - Naturally Uncommon on the most recent assessment (2017–2018; as M. brockiei) under the New Zealand Threatened Classification system for plants, with the qualifier "RR" (Range Restricted).
