= Ranunculus mirus =

Scientific classification
- Kingdom: Plantae
- Clade: Tracheophytes
- Clade: Angiosperms
- Clade: Eudicots
- Order: Ranunculales
- Family: Ranunculaceae
- Genus: Ranunculus
- Species: R. mirus

Binomial name
- Ranunculus mirus Garn.-Jones

Synonyms
- Ranunculus hirtus var. gracilis Cheeseman

Species of flowering plant

Ranunculus mirus is a species of flowering plant in the buttercup family, Ranunculaceae. It is endemic to New Zealand.
