= List of caves in New Zealand =

The following is a list of some of the more well known caves and caverns in New Zealand.

Not all caves have an official name as set by the New Zealand Geographic Board. The national caving association maintains maps of all known surveyed caves and the name is generally allocated by the group who first discovered the cave.

== North Island caves ==
- Many lava tubes and lava caves in the Auckland volcanic field, including:
  - Rangitoto lava caves
  - Wiri Lava Cave
- Waikato district:
  - Karamu Cave
  - Waikaretu
- Waitomo district:
  - Aranui Cave
  - Gardner's Gut
  - Ruakuri Cave
  - Waitomo Glowworm Cave

== South Island caves ==
- Broken River Cave
- Cathedral Caves
- Cave Stream
- Clifden Limestone Caves
- Honeycomb Hill Cave
- Metro Cave / Te Ananui Cave
- Mount Arthur caves:
  - Ellis Basin cave system
  - Nettlebed Cave
- Moncks Cave
- Mount Owen caves:
  - Bohemia Cave
  - Bulmer Cavern
- Rawhiti Cave
- Riwaka Resurgence
- Tākaka Hill caves:
  - Harwoods Hole
  - Ngārua Caves
- Te Ana – The Caves
- Te Ana-au Caves
  - Aurora Cave

== See also ==
- List of caves
- List of rock formations of New Zealand
- Speleology
