= Ōpārara Basin =

Coordinates: 41.1508695°S 172.1908772°E

The Ōpārara Basin is a basin drained by the Ōpārara River at 20 kilometres (12 mi) north of Karamea, at the West Coast Region of the South Island of New Zealand. With its large natural rock arches, a network of caves rich in fossils, and a beautiful, unspoiled natural environment typical of temperate rainforests, it is one of the most striking places of the Kahurangi National Park.

The Ōpārara Basin is also famous for its unique remains in paleozoology and for being the sole habitat of several plant and animal species.

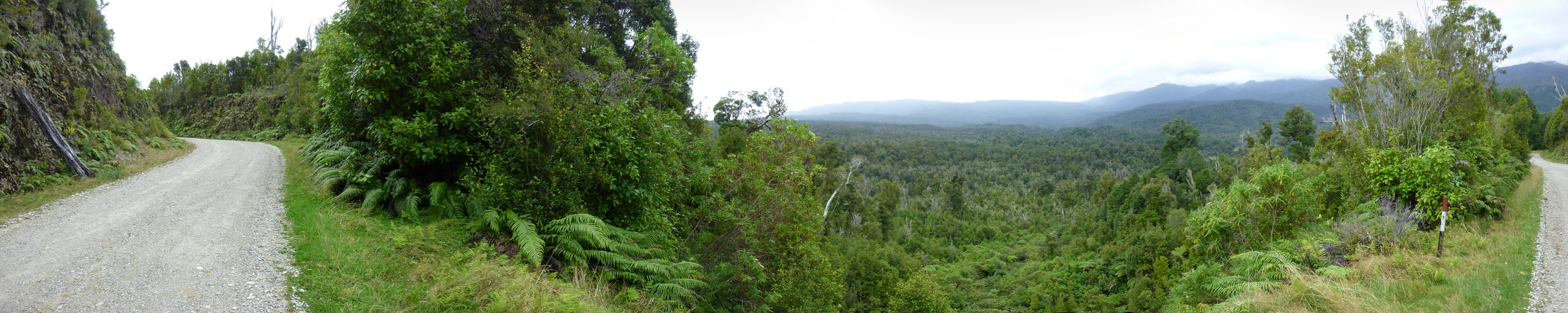
180° panoramic view of the Ōpārara Basin from the access road

== History ==
With its natural environment relatively closed and isolated, the Ōpārara Basin has long been protected from human influence. However, the locations of natural rock arches have been indicated in maps as early as from the 1880s.

Logging of native timber in the area started in the late 19th century, with the building of the McCallum's sawmill. As the logging areas progressed to be further away from the sawmill, it became necessary to build an access road into the rugged environment. Eventually, maintenance costs and extensions of this road escalated, and after changes of ownership and a belated attempt at reforestation, the sawmill went bankrupt. Selective logging continued in the forest until it was banned in 2002.

At the time of the bankruptcy, a major campaign was launched to ensure the protection and enhancement of the basin, as well as road maintenance, culminating in the founding of the Ōpārara Valley Project Trust and the purchase of the area on 1 October 2004.

Miners and deer hunters have often reported spectacular rock formations in the Honeycomb Hill area, but it was not until an exploration of the Buller Caving Group in the 1980s that an inventory of the 70 entrances to 13 km of galleries located in the Honeycomb Hill Cave system was compiled. These explorations revealed the scientific significance of the cave system by discovering the largest collection of bird fossils ever found in New Zealand.

A six-year project to complete a 30 km network of walkways and mountain biking tracks was completed in 2009, opening up more of the Ōpārara Basin to tourists who would have originally only visited the Heaphy Track.

Several placenames in the area are inspired by The Lord of the Rings, such as Galadriel Creek, Nimrodel Creek, and Moria Gate Arch.

== Geology and climate ==
The Ōpārara Basin resides on a foundation of 350 million year old granite, which was covered with a 15-60m thin layer of limestone approximately 35 million years ago. The surface layer consists of blue-grey mudstone.

The limestone layer has been extensively eroded by annual rainfall of up to 6m and the roots of the lush vegetation. Tectonic activity as well as changes in the level of the nearby sea have supported the appearance of unique geological formations. The basin currently contains many of the typical features found in a karst landscape, as well as some impressive rock arches and caves, and sites rich in limestone fossils.

== Fauna of the past ==
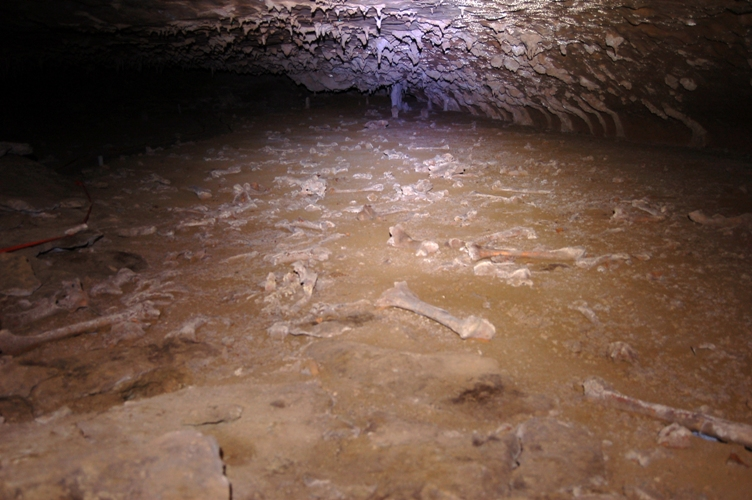
Moa skeleton in Honeycomb Hill Cave

The Ōpārara Basin is famous for its unique remains in paleozoology. The Honeycomb Hill Cave area was discovered in 1976 and in 1982 was given the status of a site of global significance in paleozoology due to discoveries of bones of several species that had gone extinct upon human settlement. In 1984, the first systematic discovery campaign led to finds of the bones of fifty birds, most of which were extinct species.

The first and most complete bones of the Haast's eagle were found here, now on display at the National Museum of New Zealand in Wellington. Further finds included skeletons of Lyall's wren, New Zealand owlet-nightjar, Aptornis otidiformis, and nine different species of moa, whose skeletons are visible in the caves. Bones of amphibians and lizards as well as the remains of about 40 different species of snails have also been found.

The wealth of intact bones and skeletons is explained by the fact that the holes in the limestone could trap bones, protect them from heavy rains and preserve them for long periods of time due to constant thermal conditions and the chemical similarity of bones and limestone. Intact skeletons older than 20,000 years have been discovered.

In 2008, the Kahurangi National Park was expanded by an additional 10 hectares to complete the protection of the Honeycomb Hill Cave system. Honeycomb Hill Cave is in a restricted area, with access permitted by permit only. The Oparara Trust has a concession from the Department of Conservation to provide guided tours of the area.

== Today's fauna and flora ==
Nowadays this basin is an important habitat of many endemic species, some of which are endangered or unique to the area.

The Ōpārara Basin is the only place where the large carnivorous landsnails Powelliphanta marchanti and Powelliphanta annectens have been found. The former species is strictly protected, with even the collection of empty shells prohibited, while the latter has only been found in areas around 700m from the Ōpārara River. The spiders Oparara karamea and Oparara vallus are also endemic to the area, while the caves are home to the protected Nelson cave spider Spelungula, glowworms (Arachnocampa luminosa), and the New Zealand greater short-tailed bat.

The Ōpārara Basin is also a habitat of the blue duck, great spotted kiwi, both classified as endangered species, as well as the endemic kea, weka, New Zealand falcon, and paradise shelduck.

Most of the area is covered in mixed beech and podocarp forest. The forest floor consists of a thick carpet of mosses, ferns, and understorey plants. Due to the sometimes shallow soil, these plants often have to squeeze their root systems through cracks in the limestone to gain a hold, furthering the erosion of the limestone layer.

The very rare moss Epipterygium opararense was named after the area and grows near the entrances of arches and caves in the Ōpārara Basin. Despite meticulous research, only 175 plants have been found near a tramping path.

Several of the plant species in the area release tannins into the water upon the decomposition of their vegetation. This colours the waters of the streams and rivers in the area a brown to red tea-like hue, depending on season and rainfall.

== Tourism ==
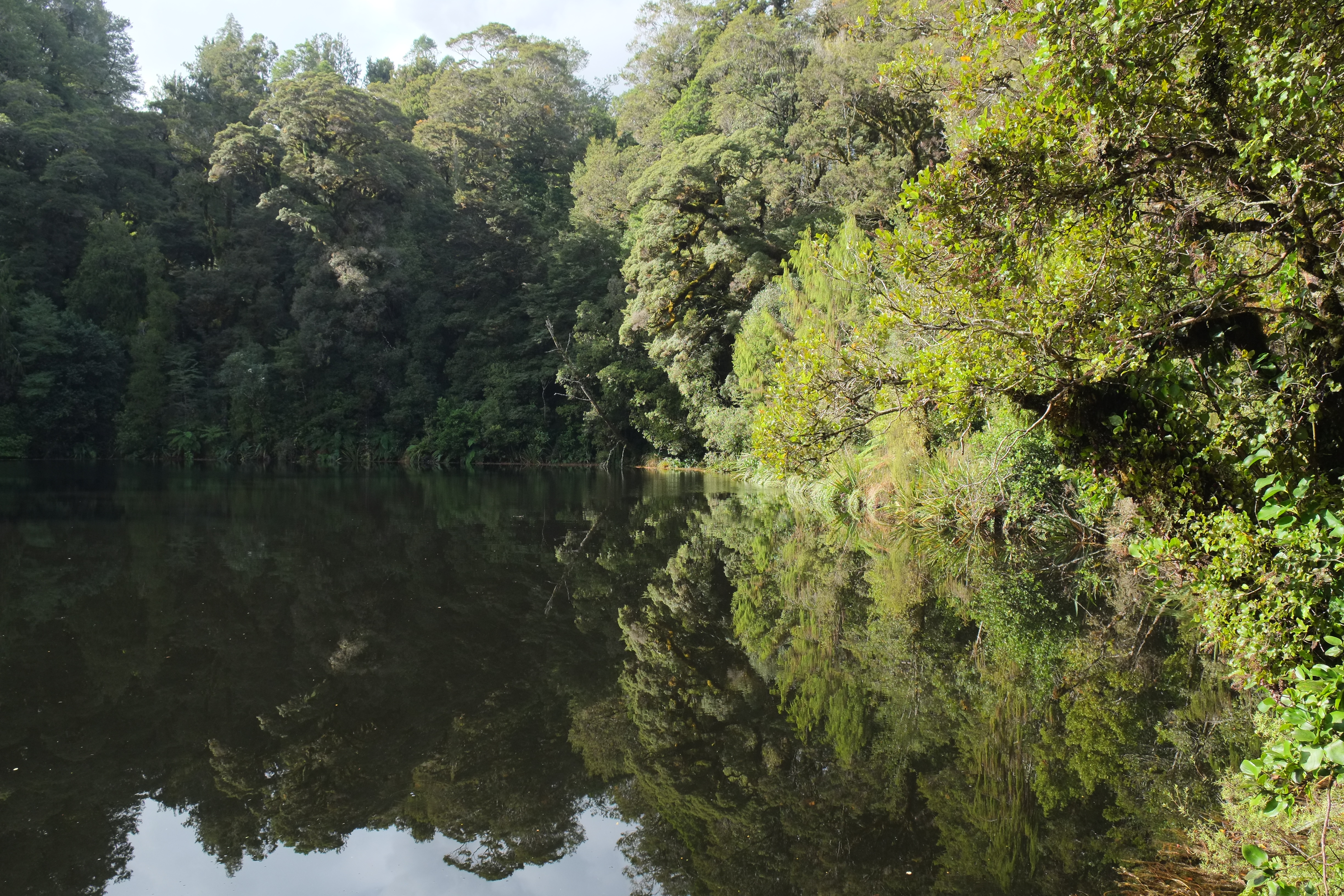
Mirror Tarn

The Ōpārara Valley is a popular tourist destination, with relatively short walks to see the natural rock arches Moria Gate and the Oparara Arch, Mirror Tarn, and the accessible caves Box Canyon Cave and Crazy Paving Cave. The Honeycomb Hill Caves are restricted to visitors on an authorised guided tour.
