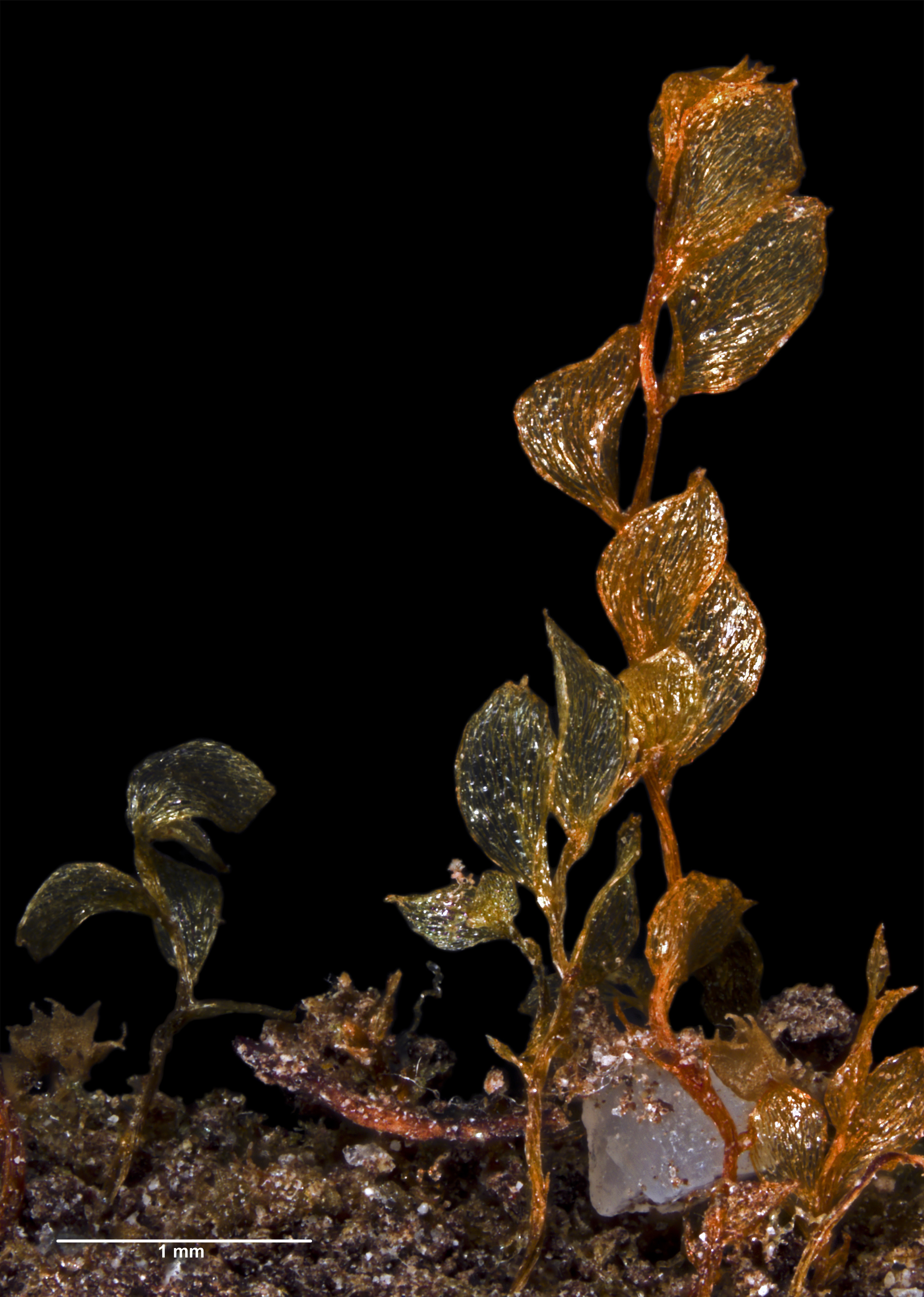

Conservation status
- Nationally Critical (NZ TCS)

Scientific classification
- Kingdom: Plantae
- Division: Bryophyta
- Class: Bryopsida
- Subclass: Bryidae
- Order: Bryales
- Family: Mniaceae
- Genus: Epipterygium
- Species: E. opararense

Binomial name
- Epipterygium opararense Fife & A.J.Shaw

= Epipterygium opararense =

Species of moss

Epipterygium opararense (also Epipterygium obovatum) is a species of moss from the Mniaceae family that is only known to grow in one site in the Kahurangi National Park in New Zealand's South Island. The Department of Conservation assigned it the rating of 'nationally critical' in 2002. It has been proposed for inclusion in the IUCN Red List.

== Description ==
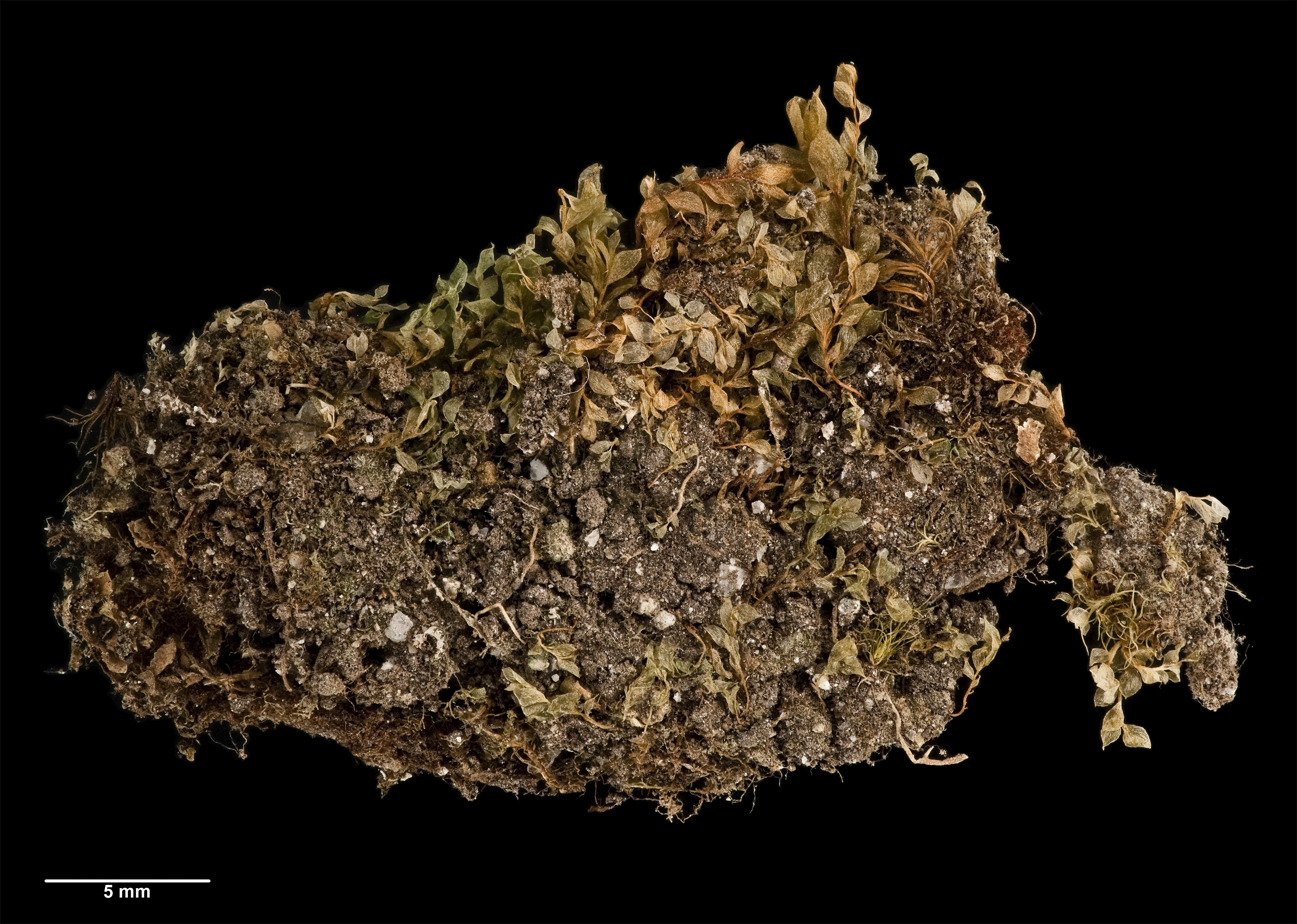
E. opararense

It has 1/2 phyllotaxy (leaves are located one above the other, rotated 180°), which is unique for the genus, which usually has 2/5; it is probably an evolutionary adaptation to the darkness of the habitat. The colour of the plants is pale green or brownish-green, while individual stalks have a yellow or red shade of brown. Several 15-mm unbranched stalks with distichously arranged single leaves grow from a common point. The leaves are elliptic; their dimensions are 1.5–2.1 × 0.7–0.85 mm; the closer they are to the base, the smaller they become. The moss is dioicous and has no sporophytes. The moss seems to be stable on granite surfaces but not elsewhere: it forms only ephemeral colonies in decaying tree trunks; the scarcity of granites in New Zealand might be the reason why the moss is so rare.

== Distribution ==
Plants in the genus Epipterygium are found in humid and warm regions, with the majority being found in Central America. Epipterygium opararense is the only Epipterygium moss that grows in Australasia.

== Taxonomy ==
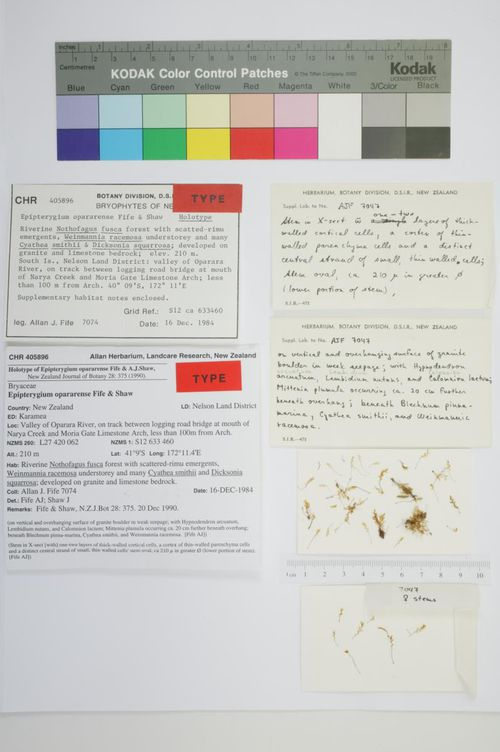
Epipterygium opararense holotype held at the Allan Herbarium.

The holotype of Epipterygium opararense was gathered by Allan Fife on 16 December 1984 with the first species description published in 1990 by Fife & Shaw. The paratype grew among Metrosideros diffusa rootlets in one locality on overhanging surface of coarse porphyritic potassic granite boulders and on moist humus around one of the Ōpārara Basin Arches in the Ōpārara River valley. In 1991, Ryszard Ochyra reported a collection of Epipterygium opararense at the Kākāpō Saddle, but David Glenny failed to find any specimens at that location in 1994. In 1992, Glenny found Epipterygium opararense inside rotten trees 1.5 km away from the Ōpārara Basin Arches.

== Conservation ==
During a survey conducted in March 2005, around 175 plants were identified by Allan Fife and Philip Knightbridge, with all of them growing in two sites located within 5 metres from each other. The site identified by Glenny did not include any Epipterygium opararense specimens by 2005; moreover, in one of the sites, Epipterygium opararense is threatened by the thallose liverwort (Marchantia foliacia). Fife and Knightbridge wrote a communication to the Department of Conservation highlighting the urgent need to protect the species. In 2008, the population suffered major damage from a windthrow with not more than 50 specimens left growing on site. Allan Fife and Jane Marshall identified 30 to 35 plants on a granite overhang in an area with a diameter of approximately 80 mm.

As at 2025 this species was classified under the New Zealand Threat Classification System as "Nationally Critical".
