= Moncks Cave =

Cave located in Redcliffs, Christchurch

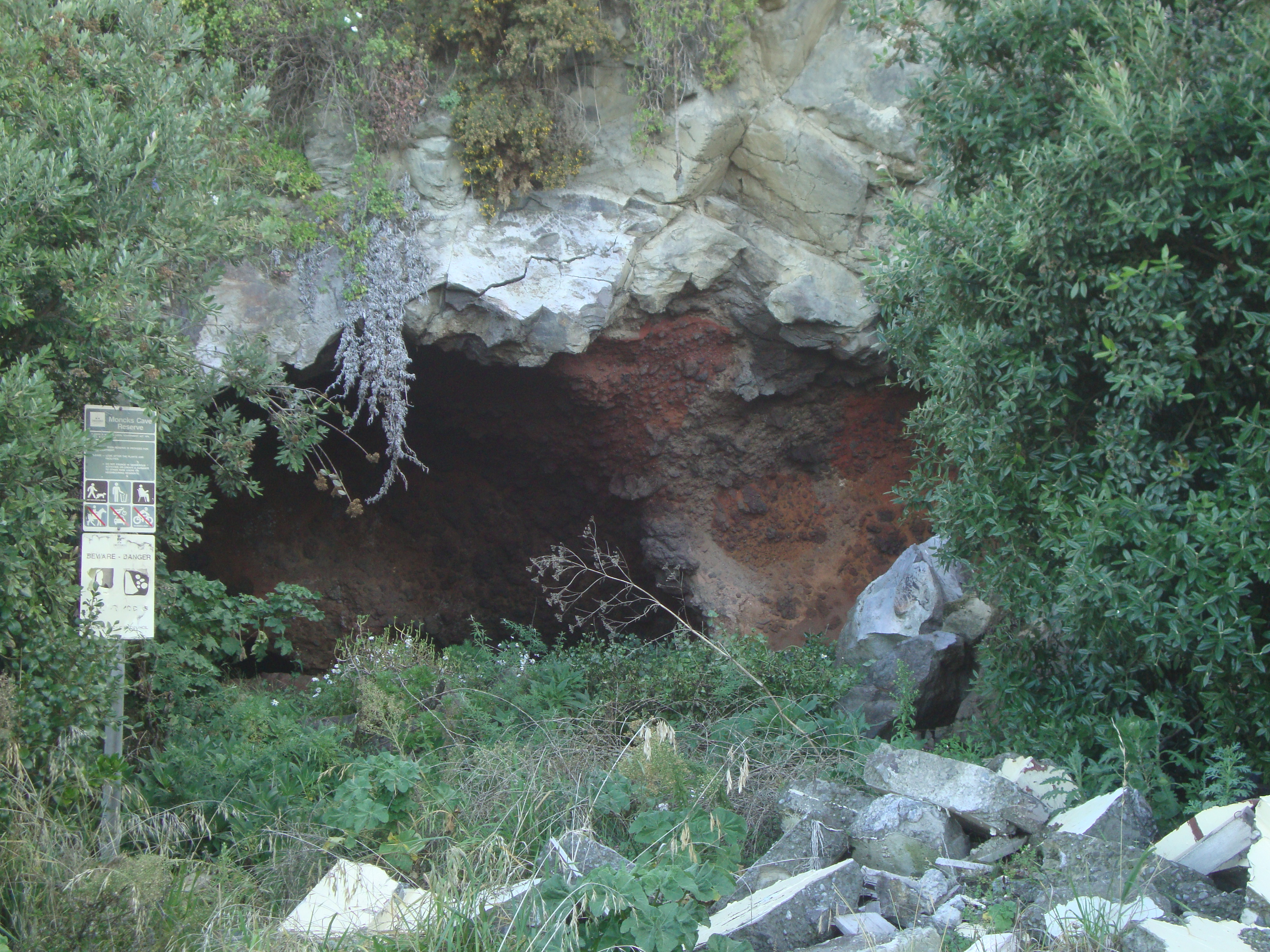
- Moncks Cave in 2012

- Location within New Zealand
- Coordinates: 43°33′52″S 172°44′21″E

Moncks Cave is a cave located in Redcliffs, Christchurch, New Zealand. The cave was uncovered by road workers in 1889, and is considered to be one of the greatest archaeological sites in New Zealand. It is notable for the evidence that it has provided of early Māori occupation.

== History ==
The cave was found in 1889 by workmen who were quarrying for road metal. The workmen cleared and dug through the base of the hill, which led to the discovery of the entrance to the cave. Large amounts of cockle shells were discovered when the cave was opened. The cave was most likely closed by a landslide that occurred before European settlement. The cave showed evidence of previous fires by the amount of charcoal found on the roof.

== Artefacts ==
One artefact found in the cave is a wooden ama, which is also known as an outrigger canoe. It was found in 1889, in the same year as the cave's discovery. Other artefacts discovered include a carved paddle, a canoe bailer, a wooden carving of a dog, fragments of a fishing net, a number of greenstone axe, an amount of black hair and bones of fish and moa, which were found in another cave inside the main one. These artefacts have helped researchers learn about Māori culture. Due to the many artefacts found in the cave, it is considered to be one of the greatest archaeological finds in New Zealand.

== Historic place classification ==
In 2009, the cave was listed by Heritage New Zealand as a category 1 historic place.

== See also ==
- List of caves in New Zealand
