= Honeycomb Hill Cave =

Cave in New Zealand

Coordinates: 41.125773°S 172.186751°E

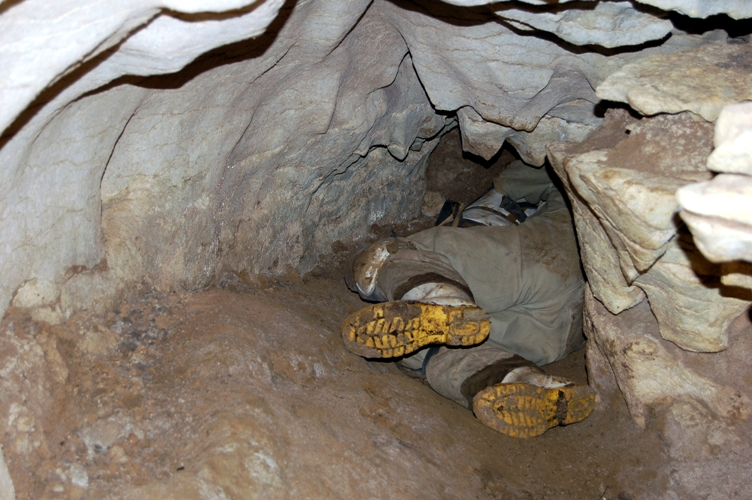
A caver crawling through Gradungula Passage, Honeycomb Hill Cave System.

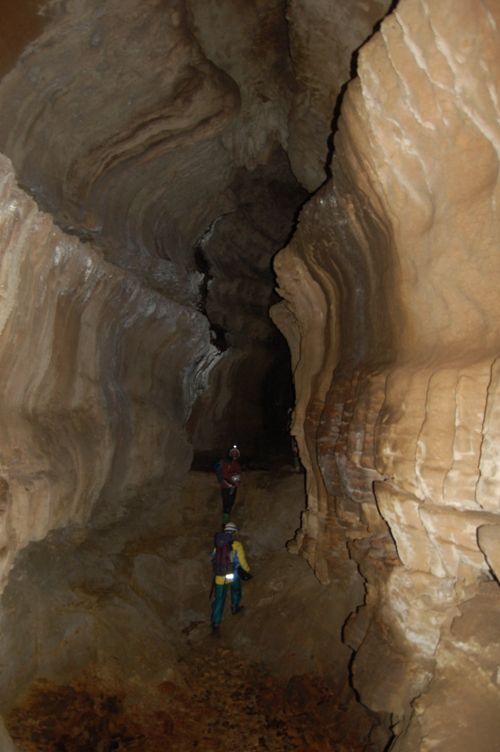
Near 'Bees knees', Honeycomb Hill Cave System.

Honeycomb Hill Cave is located in the Oparara Basin, on the northwestern edge of the South Island of New Zealand. The Oparara River flows through a section of the cave.

The cave was discovered in 1976 by the Buller Caving Group. Since then, 14 km of passages have been mapped, and several important deposits of moa bones have been discovered in the caves. In 2008 an extra 38 hectares of Kahurangi National Park was included in the Honeycomb Hill Caves Specially Protected Area to protect the cave system.

== See also ==
- Caving in New Zealand
- List of caves in New Zealand
