= Gardner's Gut =

Cave in New Zealand

Coordinates: 38.264383°S 175.075099°E

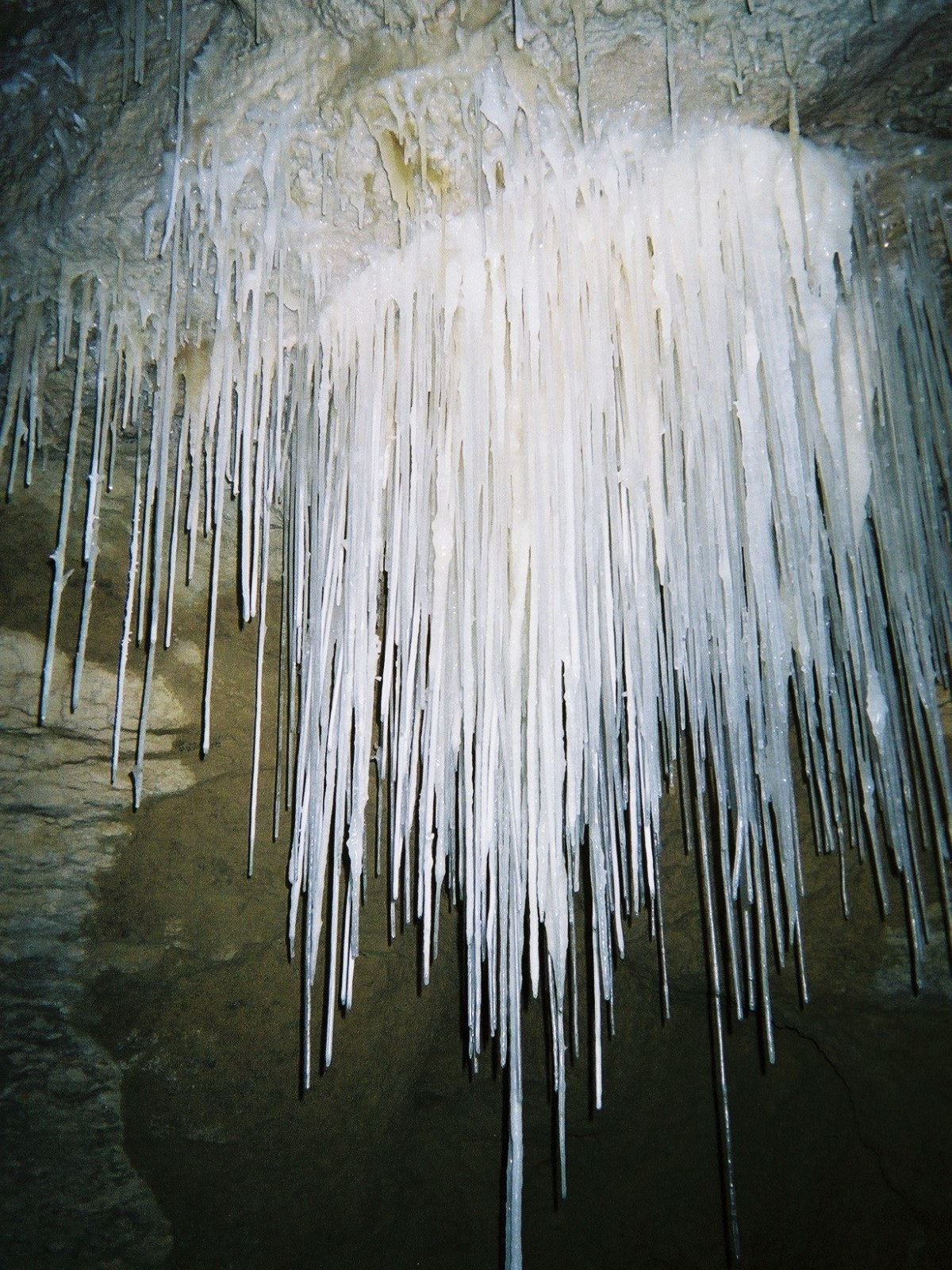
Straws (stalactite precursors) in the cave.

Gardner's Gut is an extensive cave system in the Waitomo area of New Zealand. It is located in the Ruakuri Caves & Bush Scenic Reserve, an area that also contains a number of other natural features of note. The reserve is administered by New Zealand's Department of Conservation (DOC). With a length of over 12 km of explored passages, it is New Zealand's 6th largest known cave system, and the largest in the North Island.

== Description ==
The caves making up the Gardner's Gut system are almost all composed of former or still active 'stream caves' (i.e. tunnels washed out of the limestone by water action). Various caving clubs from throughout the North Island use it for beginner trips, as it provides a variety of true caving experiences (such as squeeze points, narrow and winding streamways, large underground halls, fascinating formations and bush tramping to get to and from the entrances), yet is easy enough to pass through for any reasonably fit and non-claustrophobic person. The normal beginners area of the cave is around the Zweihoehlen-entrance ('Two Caves' in German) near the river.

Associated with the large number of amateur trips (whether accompanied by professional cavers or not) is a certain level of degradation in the cave. As cave systems are very fragile environments, many parts of Gardner's Gut cave have been damaged by the relatively frequent visits of inexperienced cavers (with, for example, formations broken off, and limestone formations dirtied, which prevents their continuing growth). However, this damage is almost invisible to a casual amateur.

One of the most impressive features of the cave is the 'Birthday Candle', the tallest known stalagmite in the country, being around 6–7 meters high and having a diameter of around 2 meters.

== See also ==
- List of caves in New Zealand
