= Cave Stream =

Cave in New Zealand

Coordinates: 43.1967°S 171.7425°E

- Broken River Cave
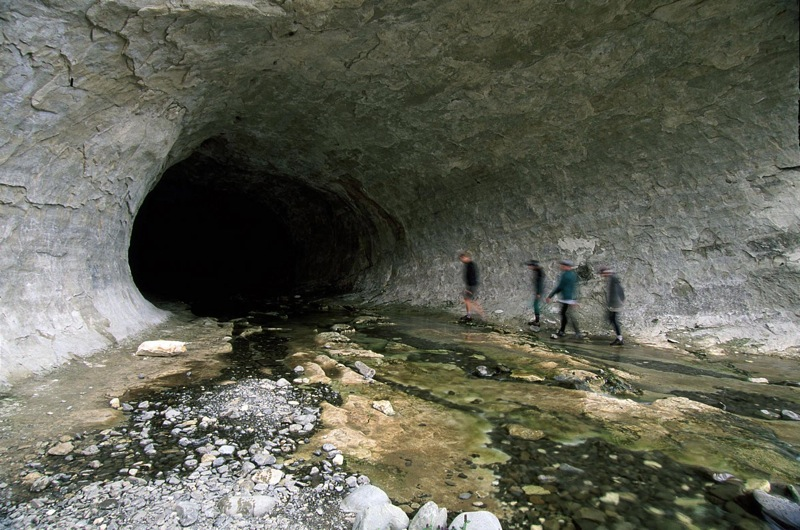
- Downstream opening of the tunnel
- Interactive map of Cave Stream
- Location: Canterbury region, New Zealand
- Length: 594 metres (1,949 ft)
- Entrances: 2
- Difficulty: Easy
- Access: State Highway 73

Cave Stream, also known as Broken River Cave, is a 594 metres (1,949 ft) long cave in New Zealand, located on State Highway 73. It is 40 kilometres (20 mi) from Arthur's Pass and 100 kilometres (62 mi) from Christchurch.

It is a popular site for passing tourists, however in spring and during heavy rains it can be dangerous to enter the cave. There have been two deaths in the cave, one due to drowning and one to hypothermia. The cave is easy to explore when the river is low. There is a minor waterfall to climb at the far end, although bolts and chains make this easy to negotiate.

== See also ==
- List of caves in New Zealand
