= Mount Owen (New Zealand) =

Mountain in New Zealand

Highest point
- Elevation: 1,875 m (6,152 ft)
- Coordinates: 41.552°S 172.541°E

Geography
- Location: Tasman District, New Zealand
- Parent range: Marino Mountains

Mount Owen is in the Tasman District of the South Island of New Zealand. It stands at 1875 metres (6150 feet) above sea level and is part of the Marino Mountains. Mount Owen is the tallest mountain found in Kahurangi National Park.

There are a number of caves in the marble karst areas on the flanks of the mountain, including New Zealand's longest cave system, Bulmer Cavern, which run for 64 kilometres. Mount Owen lies within Kahurangi National Park. The Hope Saddle crosses its eastern flank.

Mount Owen featured briefly in the first of The Lord of the Rings film trilogy, The Fellowship of the Ring. When the characters led by Aragorn leave Moria they emerge onto a rocky plateau. This was filmed on the slopes of Mount Owen.

Mount Owen is best accessed via Granity Pass. This generally involves a two-day tramp staying overnight at Granity Pass Hut. It is possible to climb it in winter but care is needed over the karst area due to snow hiding sink holes.

== Paleontological discovery ==
On 7 January 1987, a remarkably well-preserved foot of an upland moa (Megalapteryx didinus) was discovered on Mount Owen by members of the New Zealand Speleological Society.Worthy, Trevor H. (1989). "Mummified moa remains from Mt Owen, northwest Nelson". Notornis. 36 (1): 36–38. The specimen, catalogued as NMNZ S.023808 at the Museum of New Zealand Te Papa Tongarewa, retained muscle tissue and sinews, appearing so fresh that initial reports mistook it for a recent specimen

== See also ==
- List of caves in New Zealand
