= Bulmer Cavern =

Cave in New Zealand

Coordinates: 41.5583°S 172.5188°E

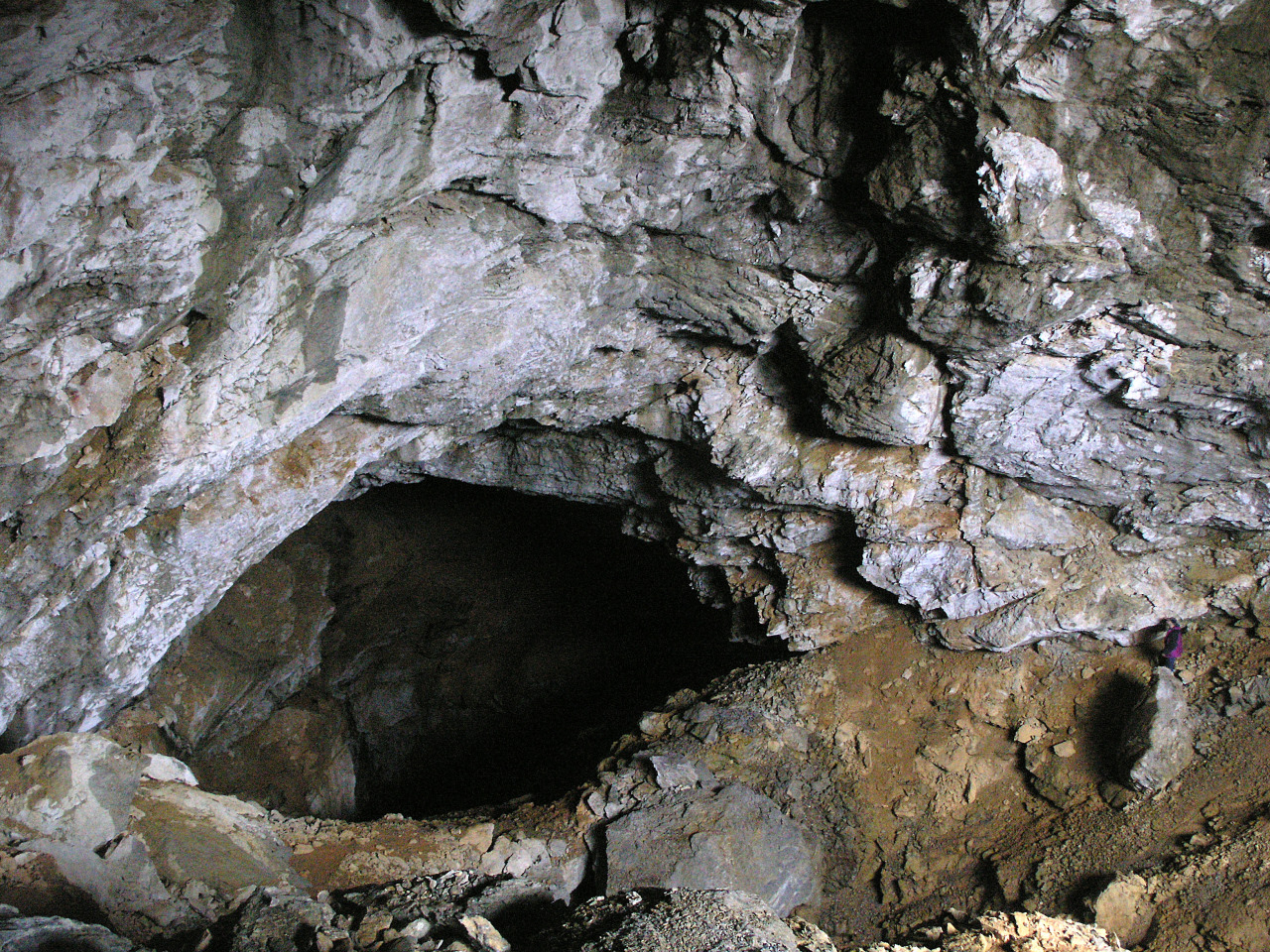
Bulmer Cave entrance room and the first pit, New Zealand. A caver stands near the right edge of the photo.

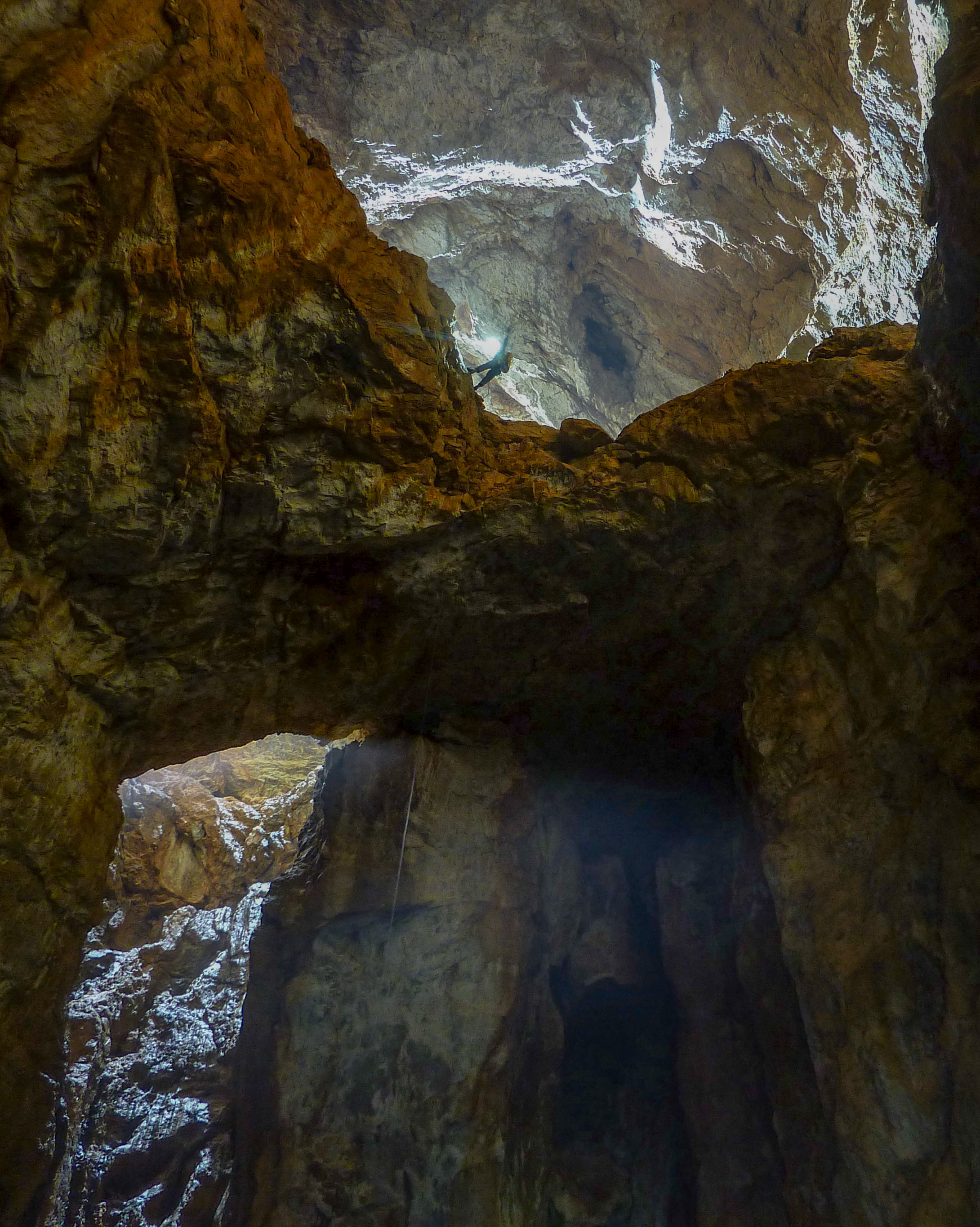
A caver descends the first pitch inside Bulmer Cavern's main entrance.

Bulmer Cavern is New Zealand's longest cave system, running for 74.3 km (46.2 mi) through Mount Owen in the Tasman region of the northwest South Island. John Patterson discovered the cave on New Year's Day 1985, by dropping a rock down and counting the seconds until it reached the bottom.

Bulmer Cavern was the location of a major cave rescue effort in 1998, when it took 80 cavers several days to extract another caver who had fallen and broken his jaw deep in the cavern.

== See also ==
- List of caves in New Zealand
