= Granity Pass =

Pass in New Zealand

Coordinates: 41°31′28″S 172°33′55″E

Granity Pass lies in the Marino Mountains, within Kahurangi National Park, in New Zealand's South Island. It is located 5 km northeast of Mount Owen.

The pass, which lies at about 1,250 metres (4,100 ft) above sea level, connects the headwaters of Blue Creek (a tributary of the Rolling River) in the west, and the headwaters of the Granity Creek (another tributary of the Rolling River) and the Owen River to the east. The pass is flanked by the slopes of the 1,648-metre (5,407 ft) Billies Knob (to the north) and 1,857-metre (6,093 ft) Mount Bell (to the south).

The pass is crossed by the Lookout Range Route, one of several tramping tracks within Kahurangi National Park. An overnight hut, Granity Pass Hut, is located close to the banks of the Blue Creek to the west of the pass.
