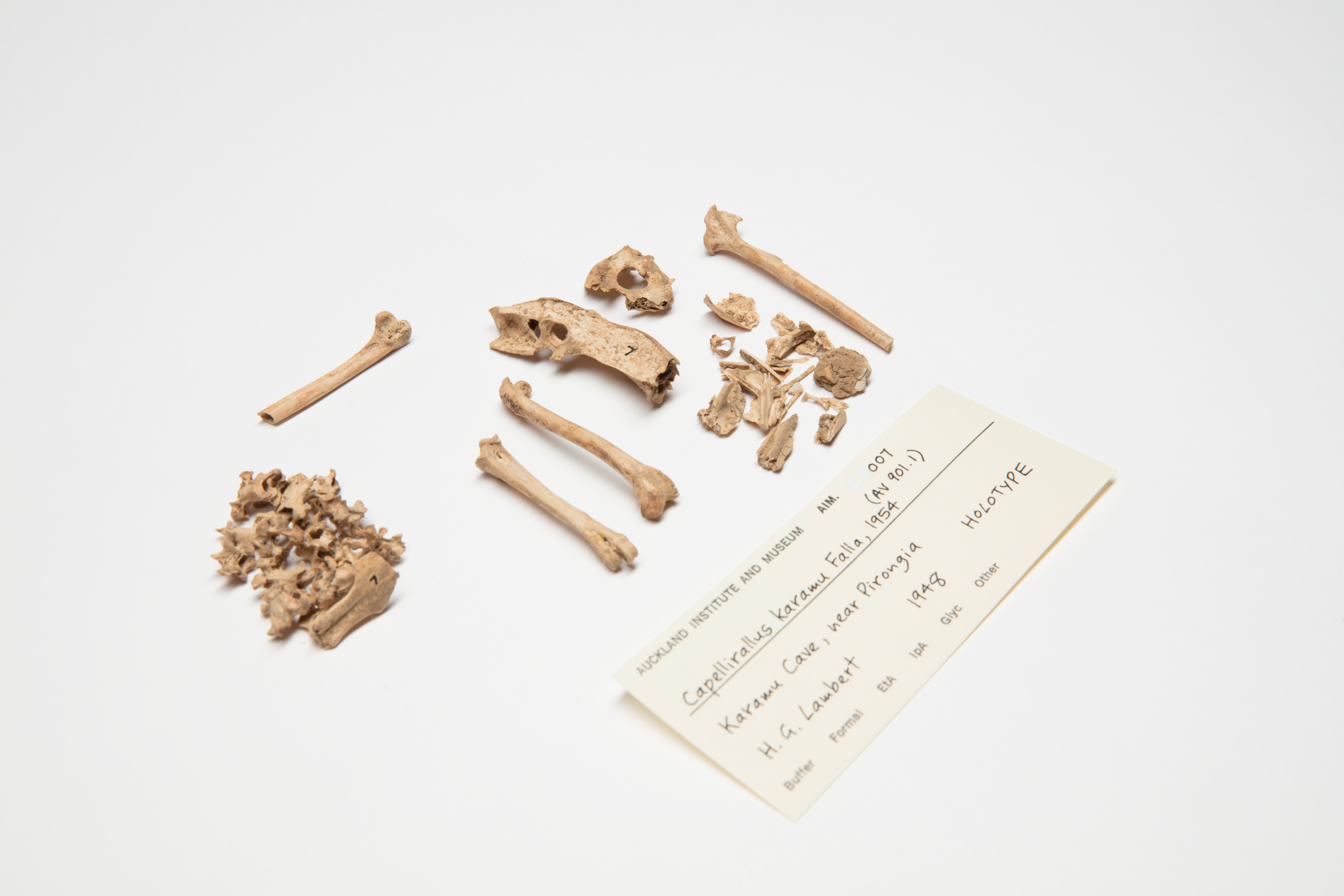
- Holotype from Auckland Museum.

Conservation status
- Extinct (13th century) (NZ TCS)

Scientific classification
- Kingdom: Animalia
- Phylum: Chordata
- Class: Aves
- Order: Gruiformes
- Family: Rallidae
- Genus: †Capellirallus; Falla, 1954
- Species: †C. karamu

Binomial name
- †Capellirallus karamu Falla, 1954

= Snipe-rail =

Snipe-rail Temporal range: Late Holocene

Extinct species of bird

The snipe-rail (Capellirallus karamu) is an extinct flightless rail endemic to the North Island of New Zealand. The species' name is derived from the Karamu Cave 21 kilometres (13 mi) from Hamilton where the holotype was discovered in 1954.

== Description ==
The snipe-rail was a relatively small rail which had a bill of about 7 cm, very long in proportion to its body size. Its weight was about 240 g. The type material consists of an incomplete skeleton, including vertebrae, a pelvis, and a hind limb. Since the discovery of these remains, many complete skeletons consisting of hundreds of bones have been unearthed on different sites in the North Island. Its evolutionary relationships to other rail species are unclear but the structure of its bones suggests that it might have been a relative of the likewise extinct Chatham rail. Relative to its body size, the snipe-rail had the smallest wings of all known rail species. It also had a disproportionately large tarsometatarsus.

== Habitat and ecology ==
The bone findings were in the western areas of the North Island, where wetter, closed-canopy rainforests prevailed. The bird's long bill suggests that it was able to forage by probing in a similar manner to kiwi.

== Extinction ==
The exact date of the snipe-rail's extinction is unknown, but it is supposed that the decline began in the 13th century, when the Kiori/Polynesian rat became widespread in New Zealand.
