= Postal River =

River in New Zealand

- Route of the Postal River
- Mouth of the Postal River Postal River (South Island)

Location
- Country: New Zealand

Physical characteristics
- Source: Bald Knob
  - coordinates: 41.1661°S 172.274°E
- Mouth
  - location: Ōpārara River
  - coordinates: 41°11′41″S 172°11′25″E
- Length: 8 kilometres (5.0 mi)

Basin features
- Progression: Postal River → Ōpārara River → Karamea Bight → Tasman Sea
- Tributaries
  - left: Bovis Creek, New Chum Creek
  - right: Castor Creek

The Postal River is a river of the West Coast Region of New Zealand's South Island. It flows west from the Fenian Range, reaching the Ōpārara River five kilometres northeast of Karamea. The Postal River's entire length is within Kahurangi National Park.

== See also ==
- List of rivers of New Zealand
