= Ōpārara Basin Arches =

Coordinates: 41°09′04″S 172°11′27″E

The Ōpārara Basin Arches are a number of natural limestone tunnels formed by the Ōpārara River, in the Ōpārara Basin, New Zealand. The two most famous ones are the 'Ōpārara Arch', large enough for a multi-storey house, and the 'Moria Gate Arch', which is smaller in height.

The arches can be reached by a forestry road from the main road approximately 9 km north of Karamea. The 12 km road is rough but can be accessed by normal cars most of the year. A carpark with a modern open shelter and toilet facilities just before the bridge over the Ōpārara River is the starting point for walks of around an hour return to each of the arches. There are also mountain bike tracks and a mountain lake in the area.

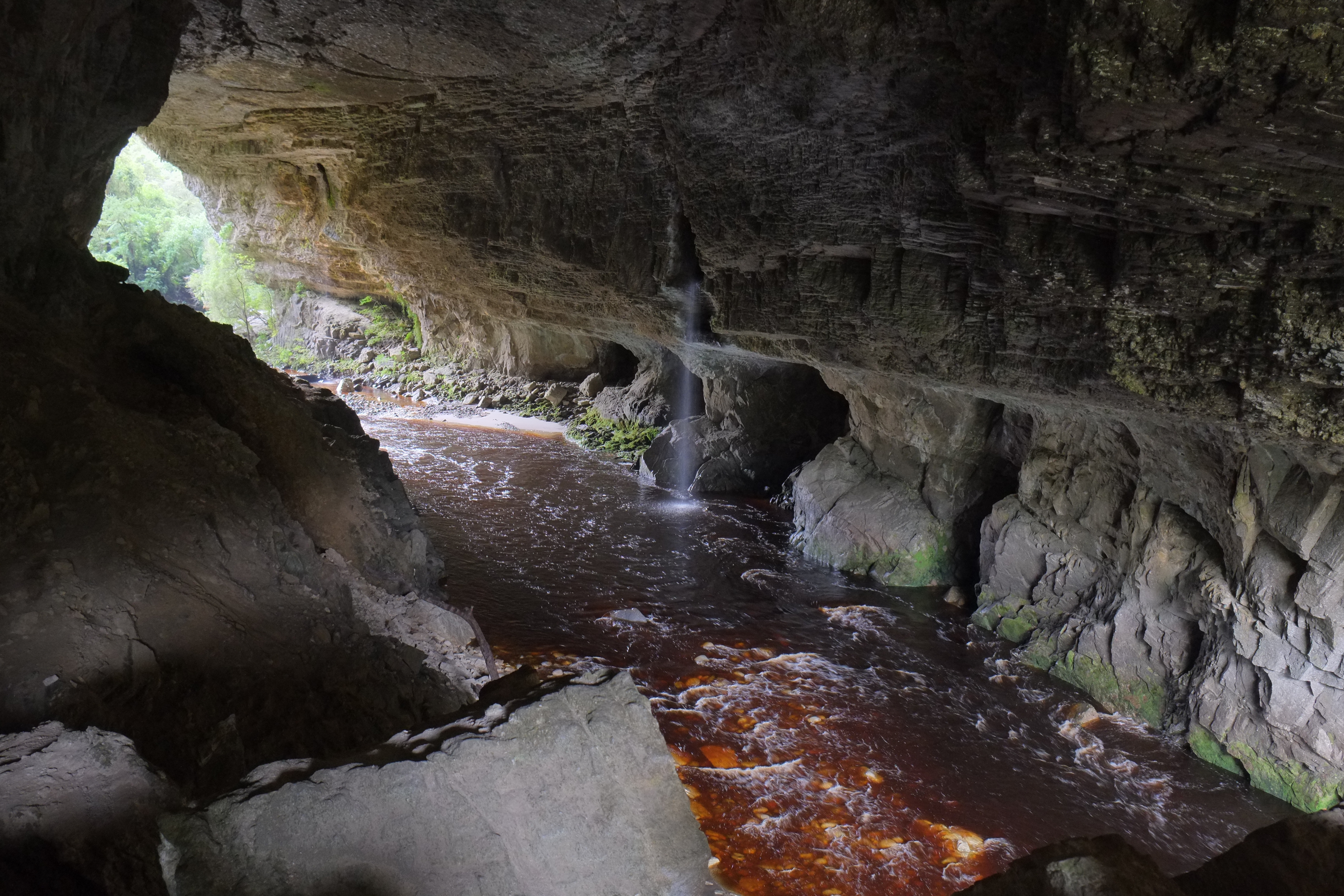
Ōpārara Arch, with Ōpārara River below colored a reddish brown by natural tannins

== Ōpārara Arch ==
Ōpārara Arch is the largest natural rock arch in the southern hemisphere. An old sign at the end of the walking track inside the arch lists the measurements as 200m long, 49m wide, and 37m high., however, the New Zealand Department of Conservation's measurements put it at 219m long, up to 79m wide, and 43m high.

The southern entrance of Ōpārara Arch can be reached via a well-formed half an hour walking track which follows the Ōpārara River upstream. Shortly after the track crosses a bridge over a small tributary stream into Ōpārara River, it leads about one third of the way into the Ōpārara Arch, ascending up a series of wooden steps to end at a view point.

The elevated view point is about two thirds up inside the height of the arch and takes in both entrances of the main arch as well as the Ōpārara River below. After rain, a small waterfall can be present in the center of the rock arch. The main tunnel is preceded (downstream) by an even taller, 10m long rock arch with a gap of about 10m to the main tunnel. Around the area of the view point, the start of the formation of stalactites and stalagmites can be seen.

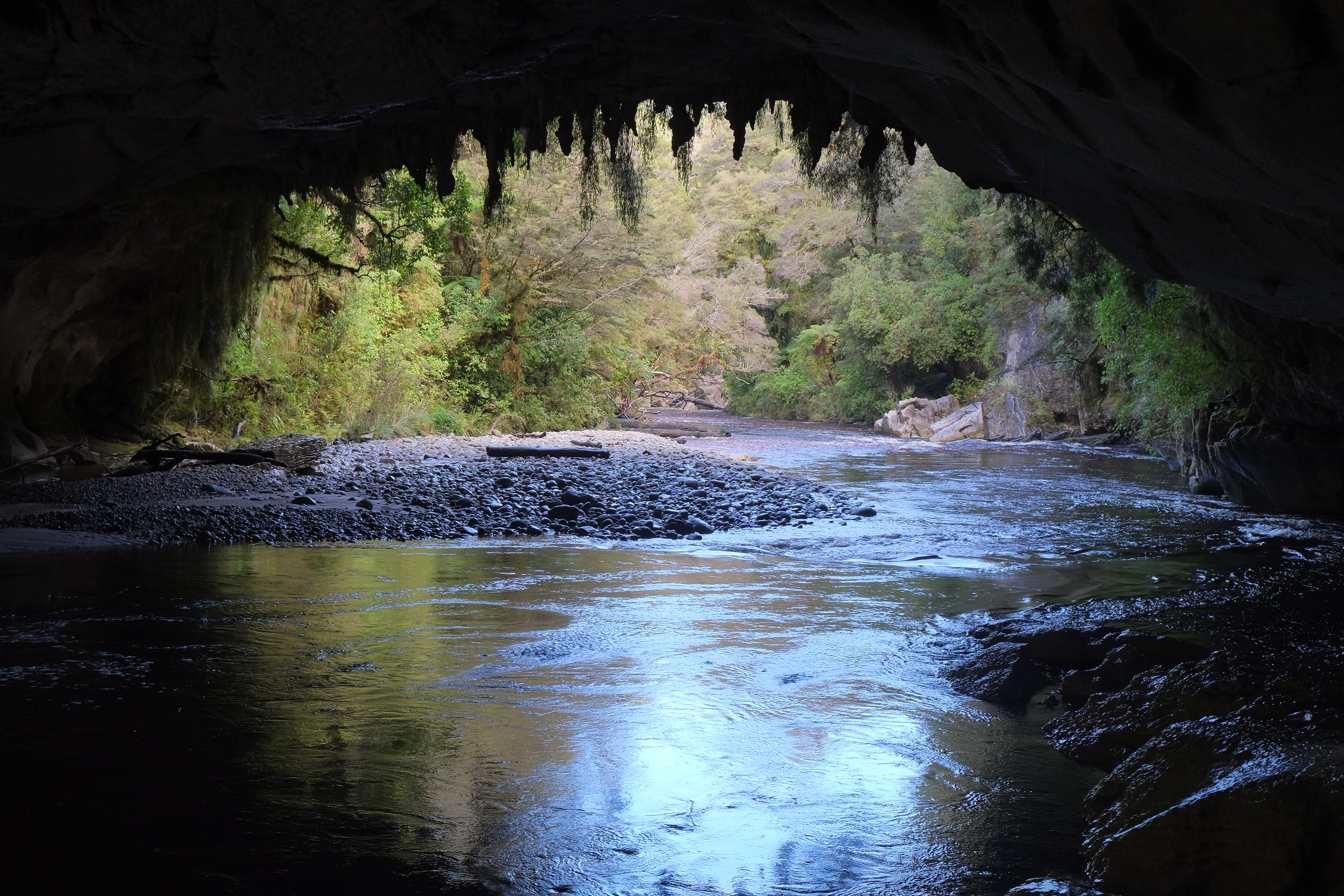
Ōpārara River flowing out of Moria Gate Arch

== Moria Gate Arch ==
Moria Gate Arch is smaller than Ōpārara Arch and can be reached on a different track from the Ōpārara carpark. The 1.5 hour loop track takes in the Moria Gate Arch and the Moria Gate Mirror Tarn, whose names are inspired by The Lord of the Rings, like various other place names in the area.

Moria Gate Arch is reached after half an hour of easy walking, however, the narrow entrance of the side track to go into the river cave descends down slippery rocks. A chain and railings to hold onto are provided for support. Once inside the rock arch, the ground is level and easy to walk on. It is not necessary to go into the cave; the loop track continues over the rock arch to a view point of the upstream entrance. A small section between the side track into the cave and the view point is paved with irregular pavers depicting Moa "footprints".

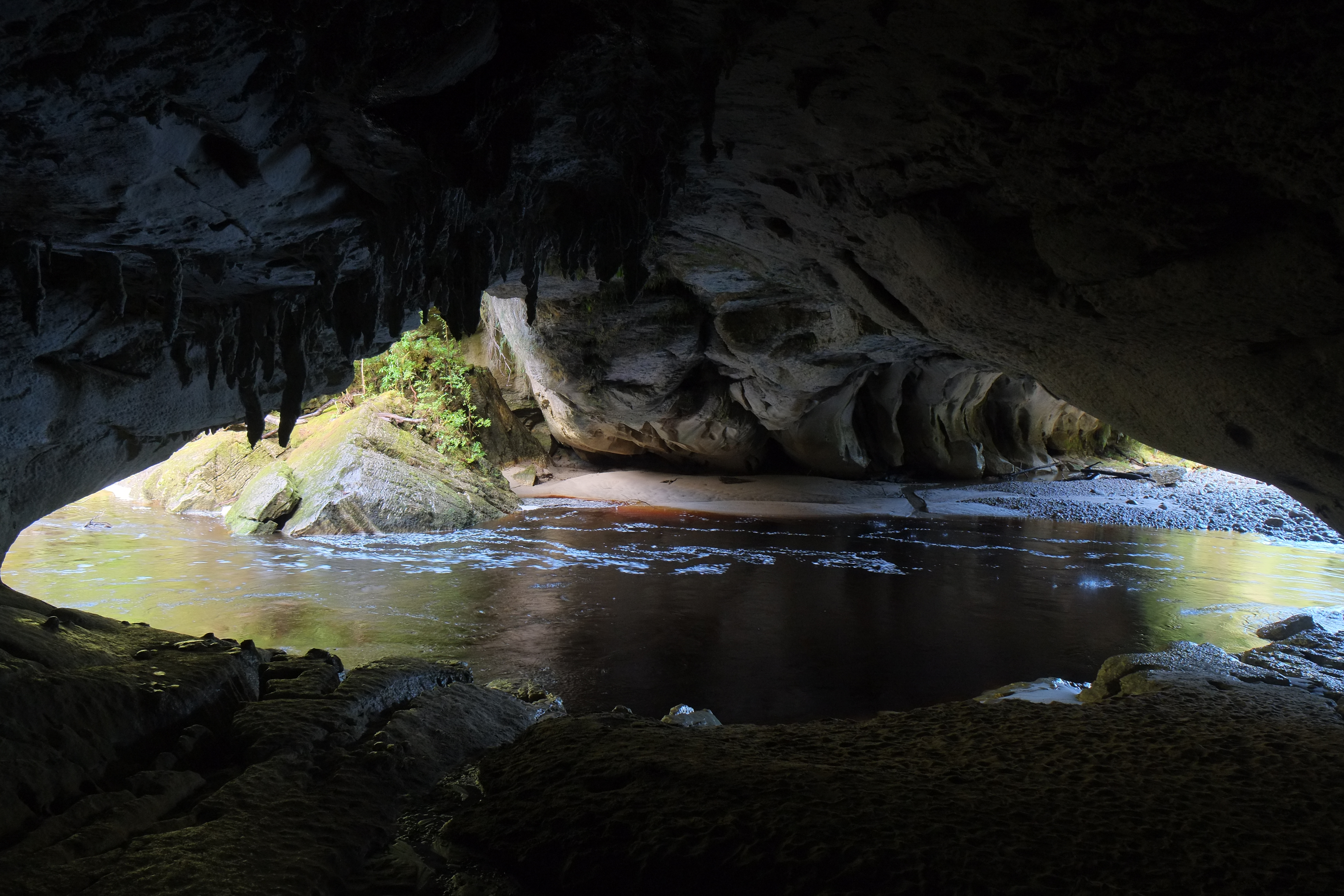
Inside Moria Gate Arch; Ōpārara River flowing from left to right

Moria Gate Arch is 19 m high and 43 m wide and its ceiling is extensively covered with stalactites and roots. The center portion of the river cave is spacious and its floor covered in sand accumulated by the Ōpārara River flowing through it, making it easy to explore the cave along the river's edge to both entrances.

== Honeycomb Hill Arch ==
The HoneyComb Hill Arch is difficult to access and is located in the restricted area of the Kahurangi National Park. This area is accessible by permit only, as it contains several sites of globally significant fossils and finds of extinct birds. The rock arch can only be accessed by kayak.
