= Te Ana – The Caves =

Cave in New Zealand

Coordinates: 42.4117°S 173.6585°E

Te Ana – The Caves (formerly known as Maori Leap Cave) is a limestone cave open to tourists on State Highway 1, 2 km south of Kaikōura.

== Discovery ==
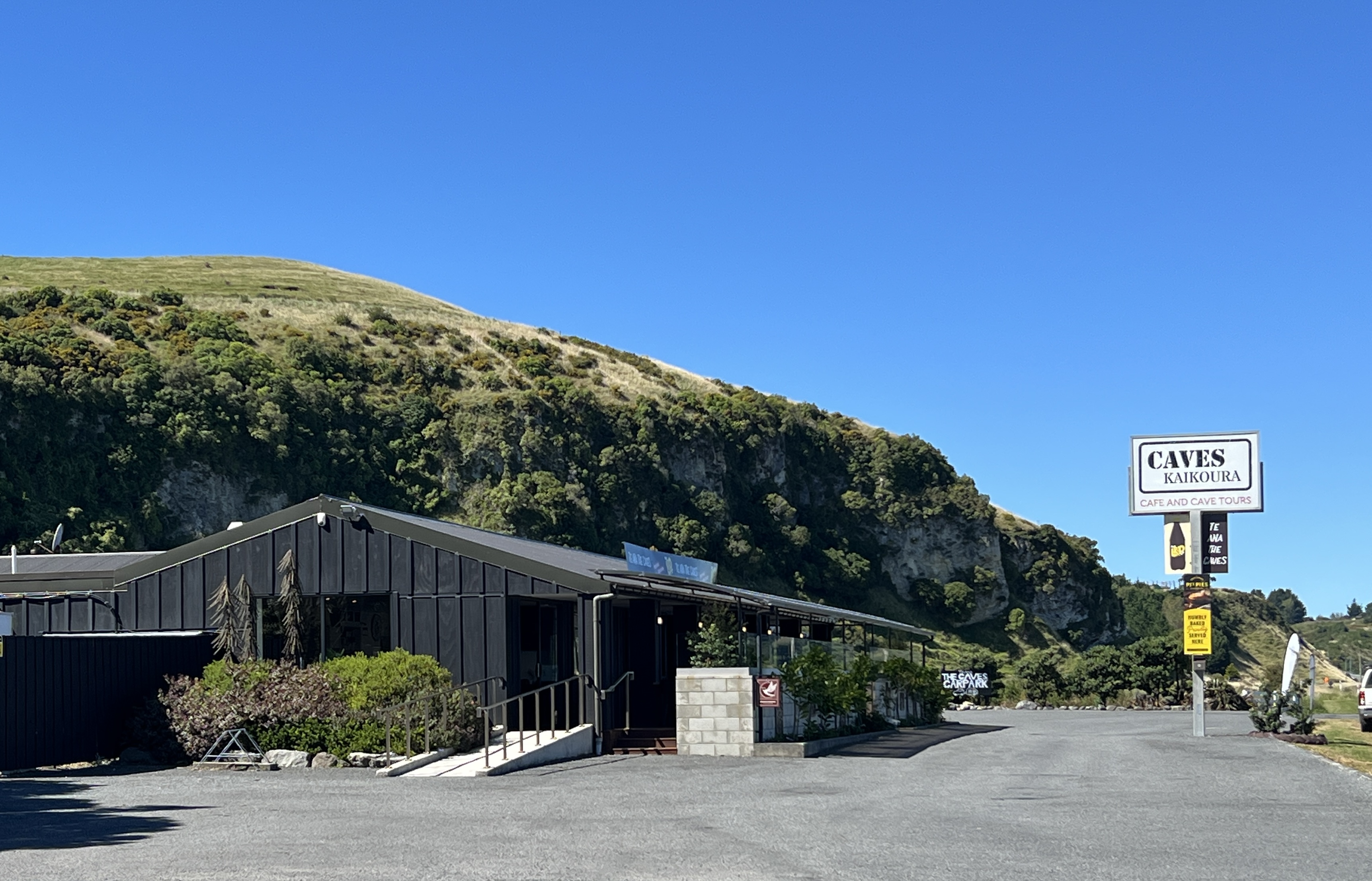
Te Ana – The Caves cafe and tourist operation

In 1959, Tom Anderson had a limestone crushing plant at a bluff two km south of Kaikōura. He was scooping up limestone when the bucket on his dragline excavator broke through the surface of the hill and a small hole appeared up on the hillside. After investigating and discovering that there was a cavity behind the hole, Anderson enlarged the hole and put a long ladder into it to explore the cave he had uncovered. About 9 m (30 ft) down the ladder inside the cave was a slope of rubble, which enabled Anderson to reach the base of the cave 6 m (20 ft) further down and on about the same level as the road outside. The cave was named Maori Leap Cave, referencing a local legend about a Māori man or woman (depending on the version of the story) leaping off the hill either to escape a pursuing war party or because of love gone wrong.

== Geology ==
The cave is a phreatic sea cave (meaning the limestone was dissolved by the sea) about two million years old. It runs southeast to northwest and is approximately 91 m (300 ft) long. The average height inside is between 3.6 and 7.6 m (12 to 25 ft), but at its highest point the cave reaches up 15 m (50 ft) from the floor. The average width of the cave is about 5.5 m (18ft).

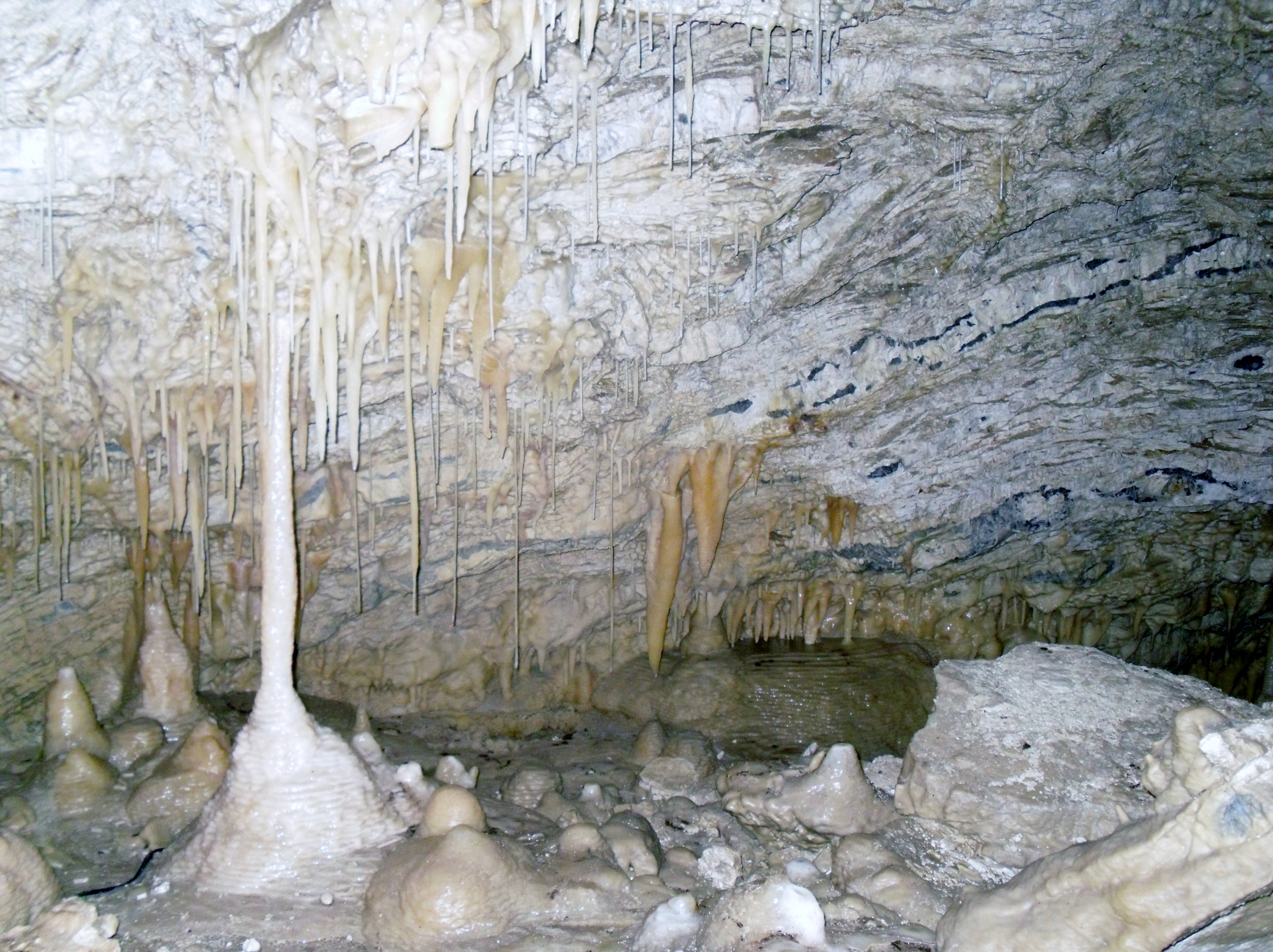
Interior

Limestone blasting outside over many years dislodged hundreds of tons of rock from the roof and walls, and at the time of its discovery in 1959 the rubble lay in huge heaps on the floor. At the southern, seaward end of the cave the original floor could be reached. It was covered in beach shingle similar to that on the shoreline outside, and shells were found in the shingle. Carbon-dating of little blue penguin bones found inside the cave showed them to be about 6000 years old. It is presumed that a rockfall around that time blocked the sea-level entrance to the cave. Anderson found no indication of human activity. Tui, kiwi and tuatara bones found in the cave led Canterbury Museum staff to speculate that there might have been a Māori pā on the hill above the cave at some time, although no evidence of any habitation was found.

Although blasting has caused damage to the interior of the cave, it still contains many formations of limestone stalagmites and stalactites up to four feet long in colours of pale gold, salmon pink and amber. The interior of the cave is about 13 °C (56 °F) and slightly damp and dripping.

== Tourism ==
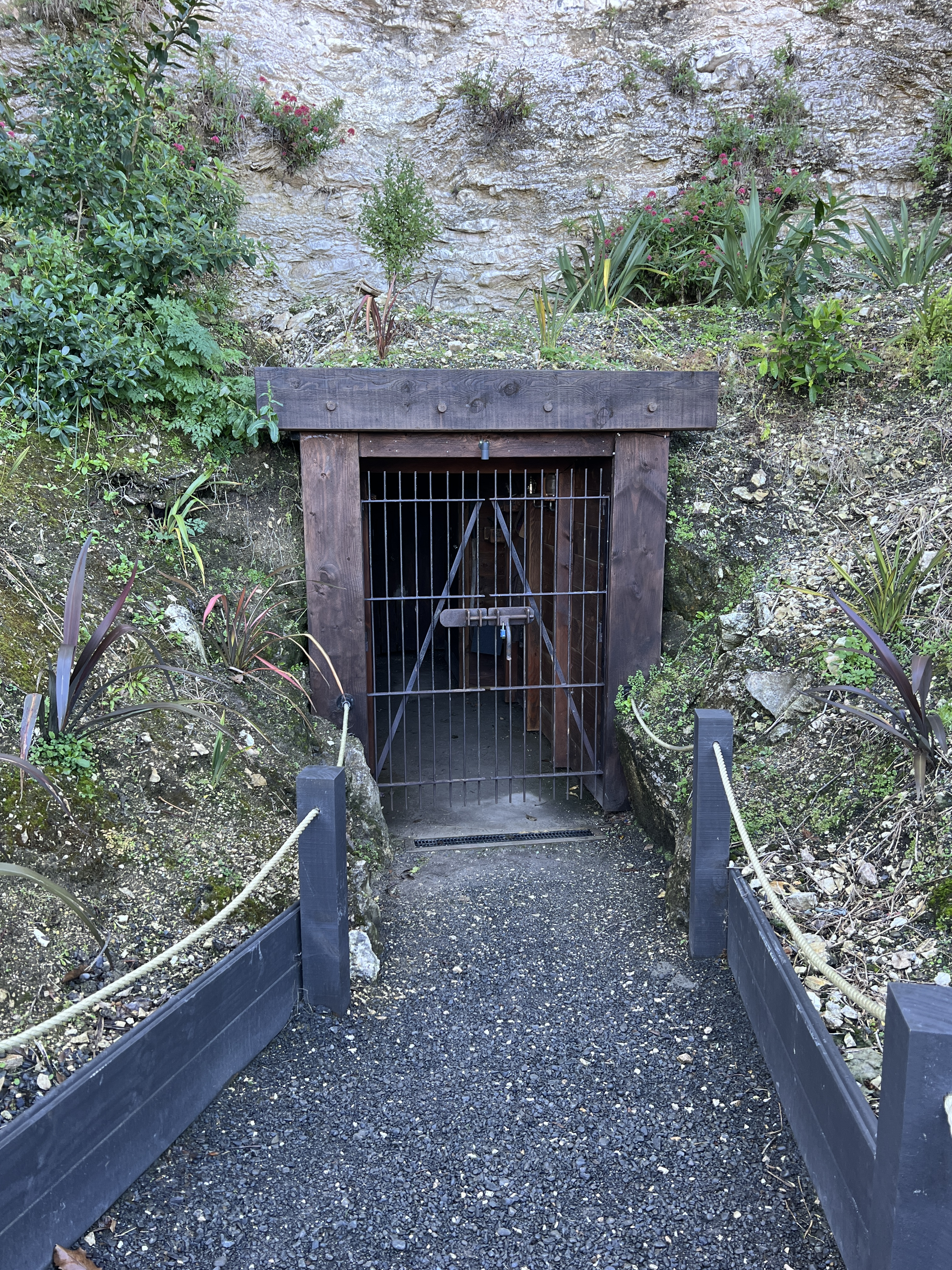
Current entrance

The cave is privately owned and operated in conjunction with a café alongside SH 1. The current ground-level entrance to the cave was excavated after its discovery in 1959. Walkways were constructed for ease of access, and the cave officially opened to the public in November 1960. The cave closed after the 2016 Kaikōura earthquake, but reopened late in 2025 with a new name: Te Ana - The Caves.
