= Karamu Cave =

Cave in New Zealand

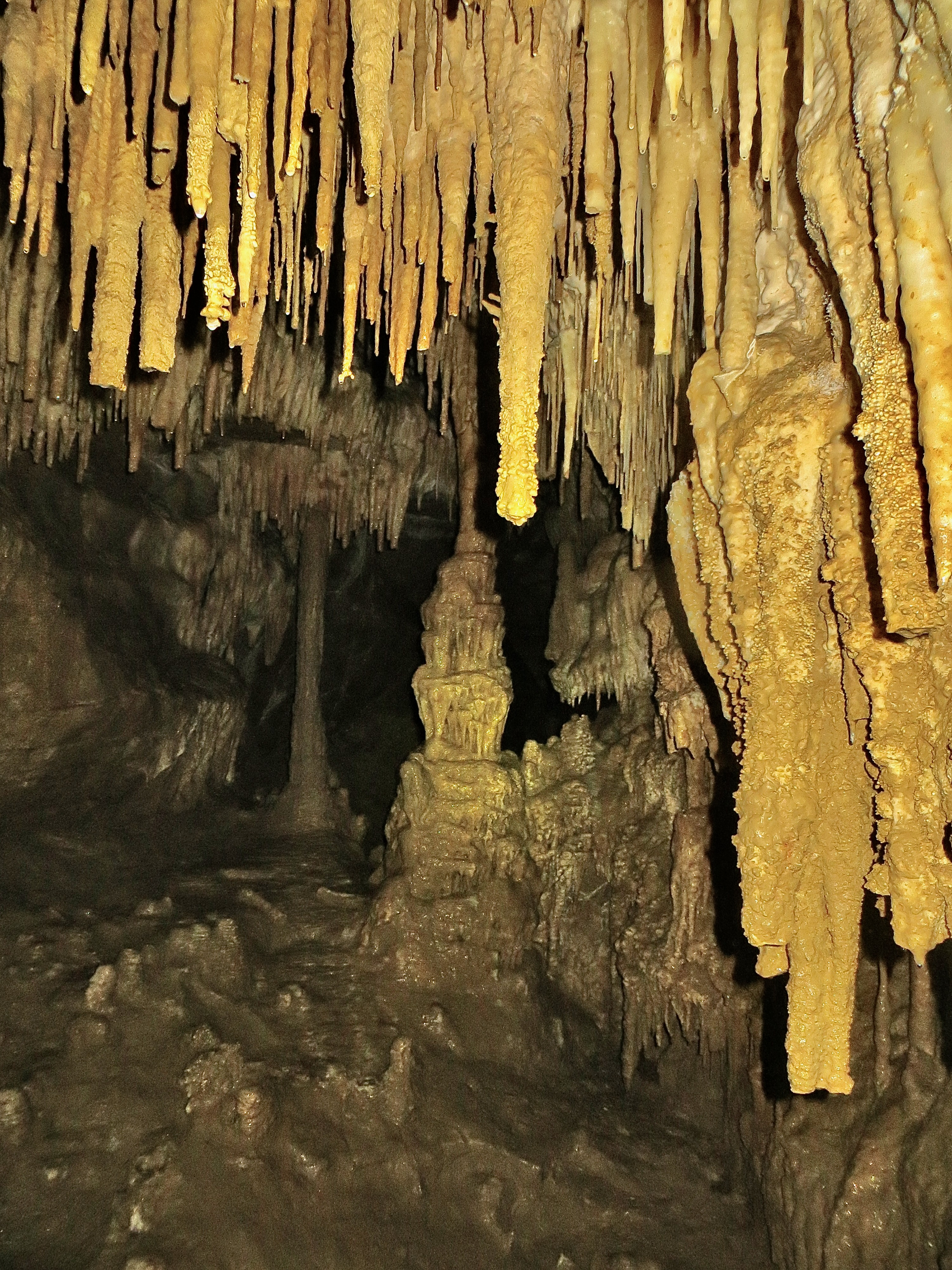
- The wedding cake, Karamu Cave
- Interactive map of Karamu Cave
- Coordinates: 37.89571°S 175.07270°E
- Discovery: 1925
- Geology: Limestone

Karamu Cave is a stream cave of over 2 miles (3.2 km), with several large chambers, near Karamu in the North Island of New Zealand, which Waikato Regional Council has classed as regionally significant. It was discovered about 1925, after blasting at the nearby limeworks. The name "Karamu" comes from the Māori word for the karamū tree. Bones of moas were found in the cave in 1927 and of the snipe-rail (Capellirallus karamu) in 1954.

The cave is in 30 million year old Elgood Limestone, with stalactites, stalagmites, flowstone, crystals and fossils. Glowworms (Māori: Titiwai) live in the caves, as humidity is high, which suits the silk threads which capture their prey. In 1946 there was mention of a Te Pahu Colliery near the caves.
