= Ōpārara River =

River in New Zealand

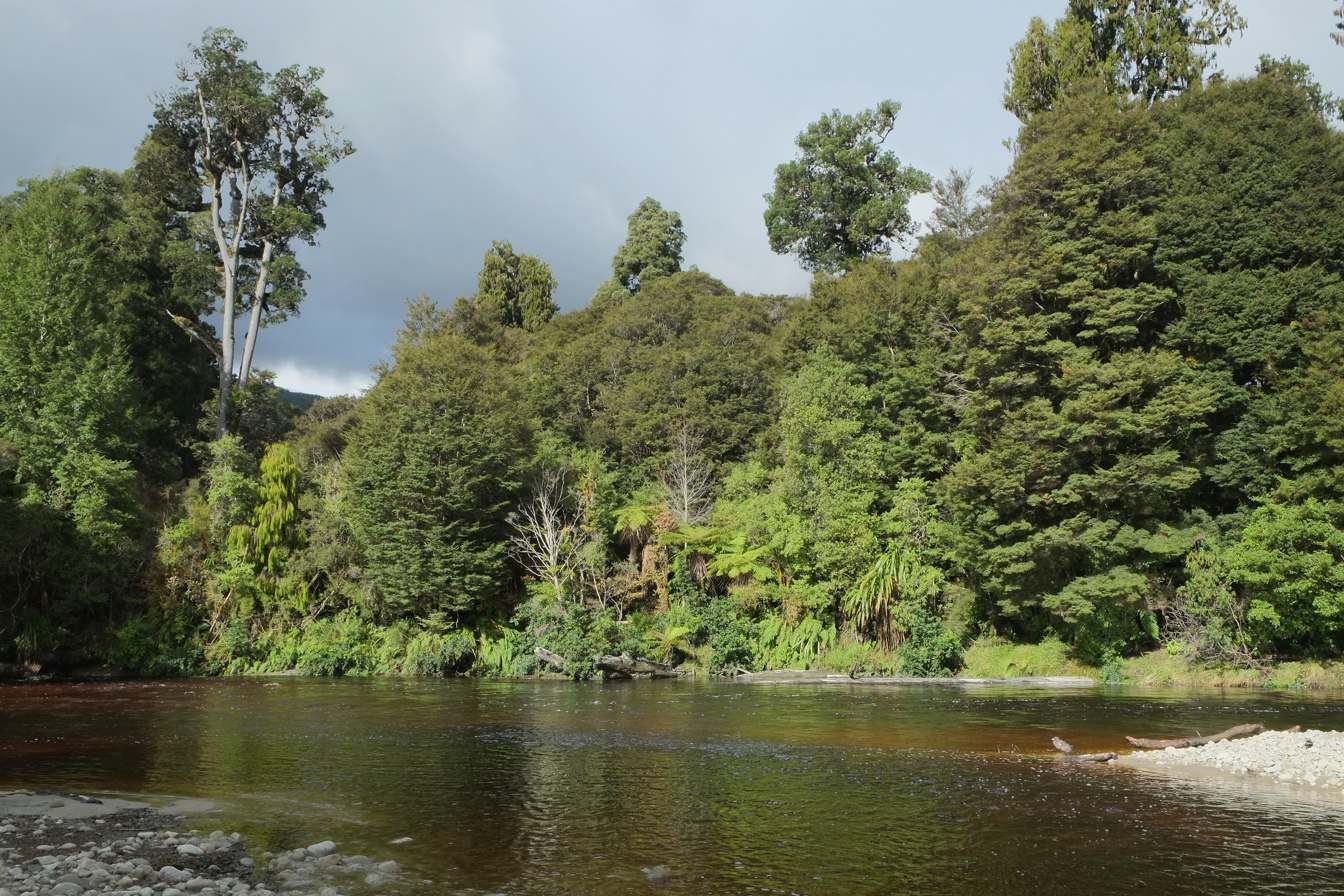
- Ōpārara River near Moria Gate Mirror Tarn
- Route of the Ōpārara River
- Mouth of the Ōpārara River Ōpārara River (South Island)

Location
- Country: New Zealand

Physical characteristics
- Source
  - coordinates: 41.0783°S 172.2298°E
- Mouth
  - location: Karamea Bight
  - coordinates: 41°12′51″S 172°06′32″E
  - elevation: 0 metres (0 ft)
- Length: 25 kilometres (16 mi)

Basin features
- Progression: Ōpārara River → Karamea Bight → Tasman Sea
- Tributaries
  - left: Celeborn Creek, Nimrodel Creek, Postal River, Fenian Creek, Splinter Creek
  - right: Nenya Creek, Vilya Creek, Narya Creek

The Ōpārara River is a river in the West Coast region of New Zealand's South Island. It is best known for the limestone arches it carved in the Oparara Basin.

The river and most of its tributaries originate in the Fenian Ranges in the Kahurangi National Park, where the river flows through a section of the Honeycomb Hill Cave. Further downstream it continues through the Ōpārara Basin Arches, both of which are popular walking destinations. These sections of the Ōpārara River, while still in dense native forest, can be reached by a forestry road. For the majority of its length it continues to meander south through the Ōpārara Basin before turning west to flow into the Tasman Sea near the small settlement of Ōpārara north of the township of Karamea.

The river's colour varies from tea-like shades of golden brown to red from the natural organic tannins released into the water by several of the plant species in the area. Leaves and other plant matter on the forest floor release these tannins as they decompose – this eventually leeches into and stains the water, with the shade and intensity varying depending on rainfall and season.

The river and contributing streams in the area are a habitat for the endangered South Island whio; the area used to sustain a large population of whio and is now a location for a recovery programme run by the New Zealand Department of Conservation. The rare and protected Ōpārara giant land snail (Powelliphanta annectens) has only been found in areas around 700 m from the Ōpārara River.

Brown trout can be fished year-round in the river's estuary.

Waters of the Oparara River stained different hues from golden-brown to red by naturally occurring tannins

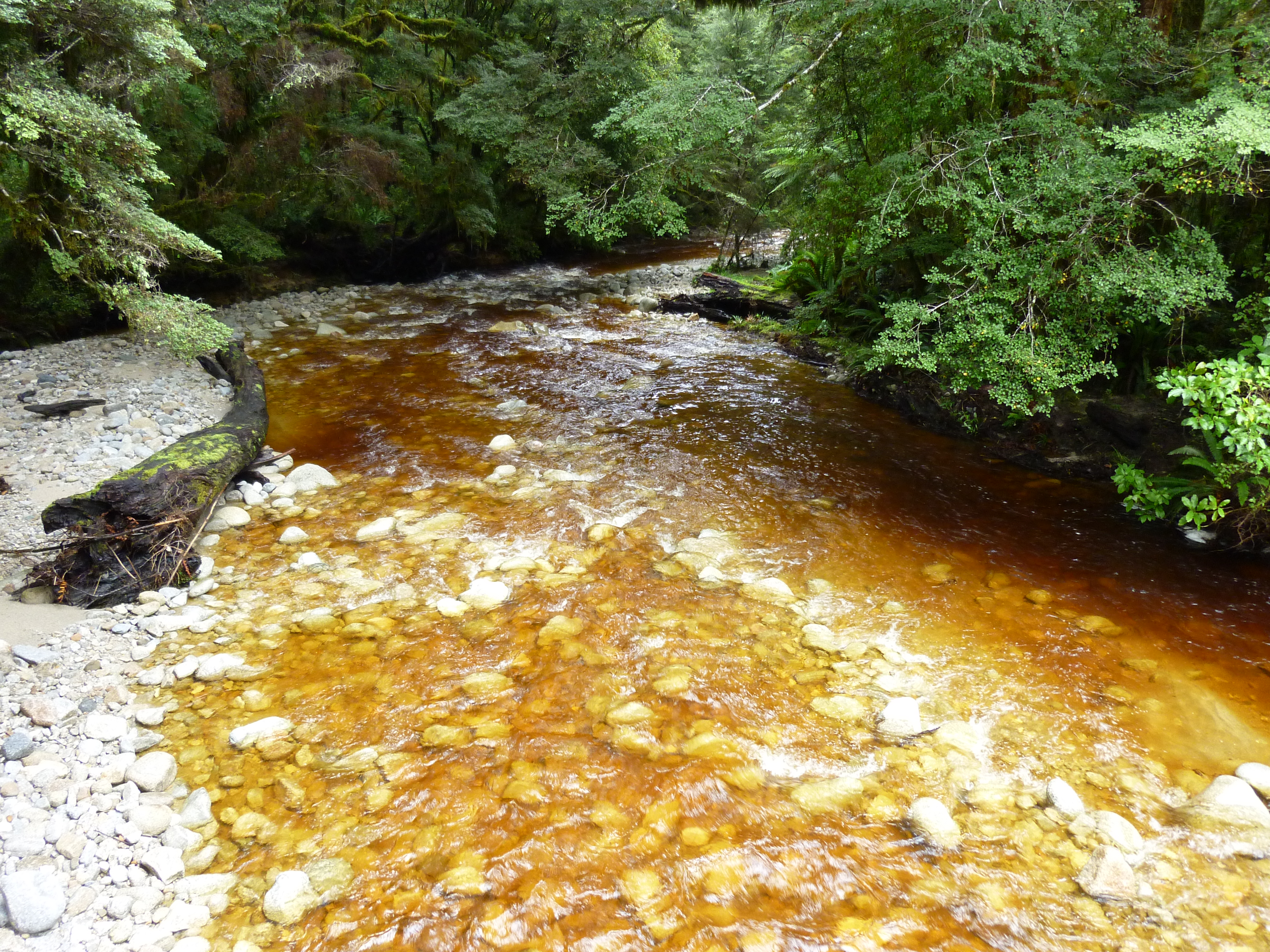

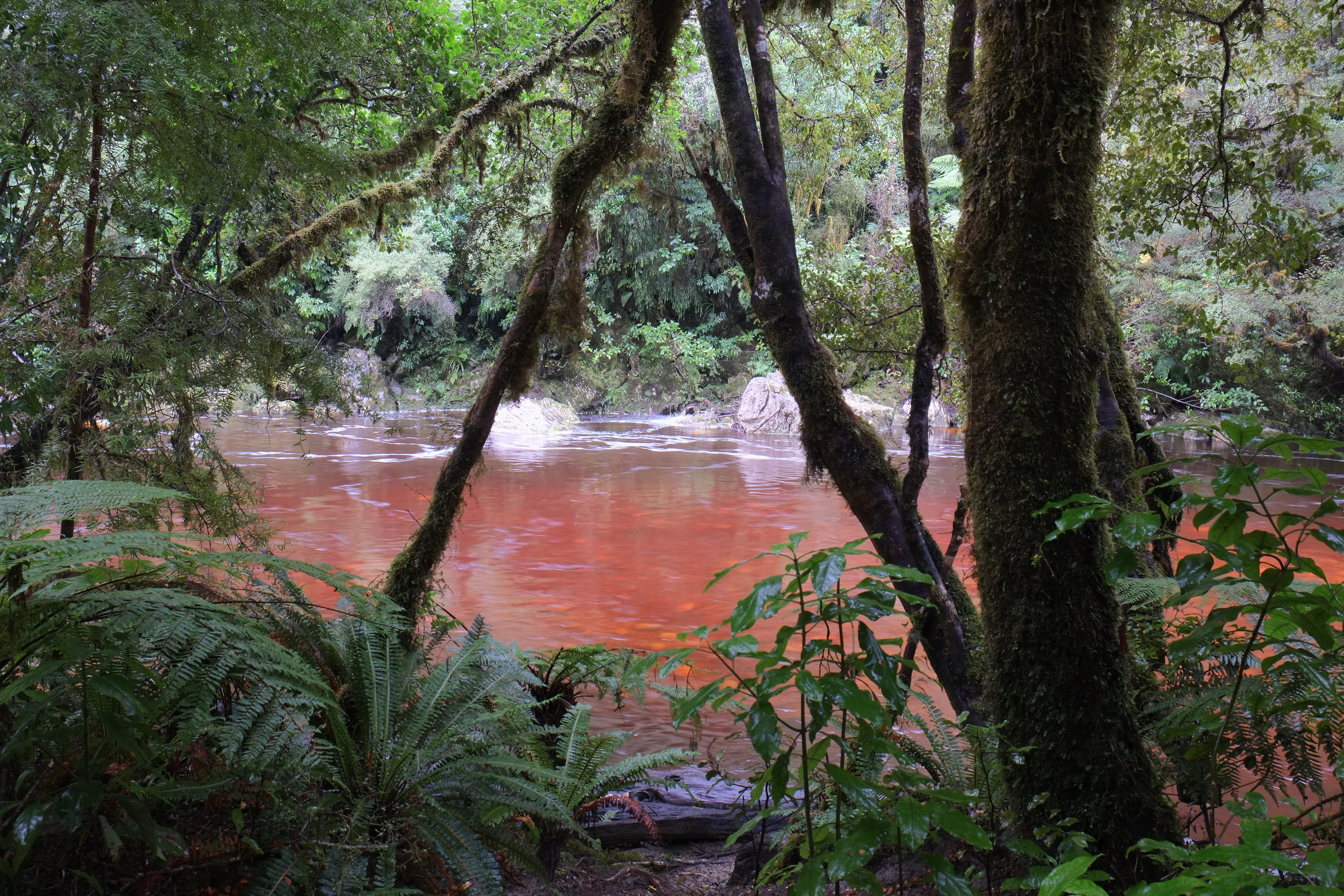
