= Geology of the West Coast Region =

Geology in New Zealand

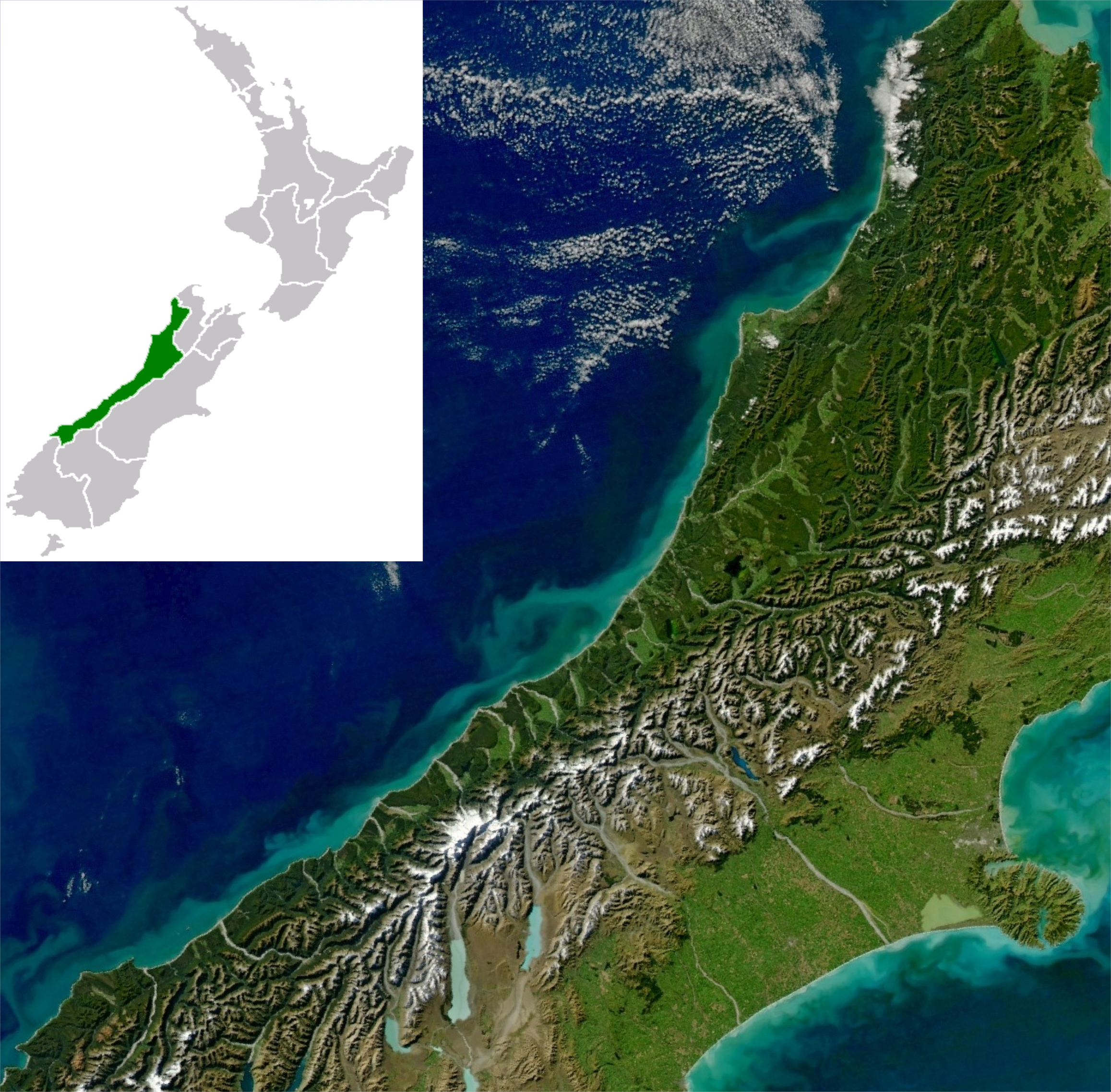
West Coast region, New Zealand

The geology of the West Coast of New Zealand's South Island is divided in two by the Alpine Fault, which runs through the region in a north–south direction. To the west of the fault, Paleozoic basement rocks are interluded by plutones and both are unconformably covered in a sedimentary sequence. To the east of the Alpine Fault are the Mesozoic Alpine Schist and Greywacke of the Southern Alps. There are numerous active faults throughout the region.

== Geomorphology and tectonics ==
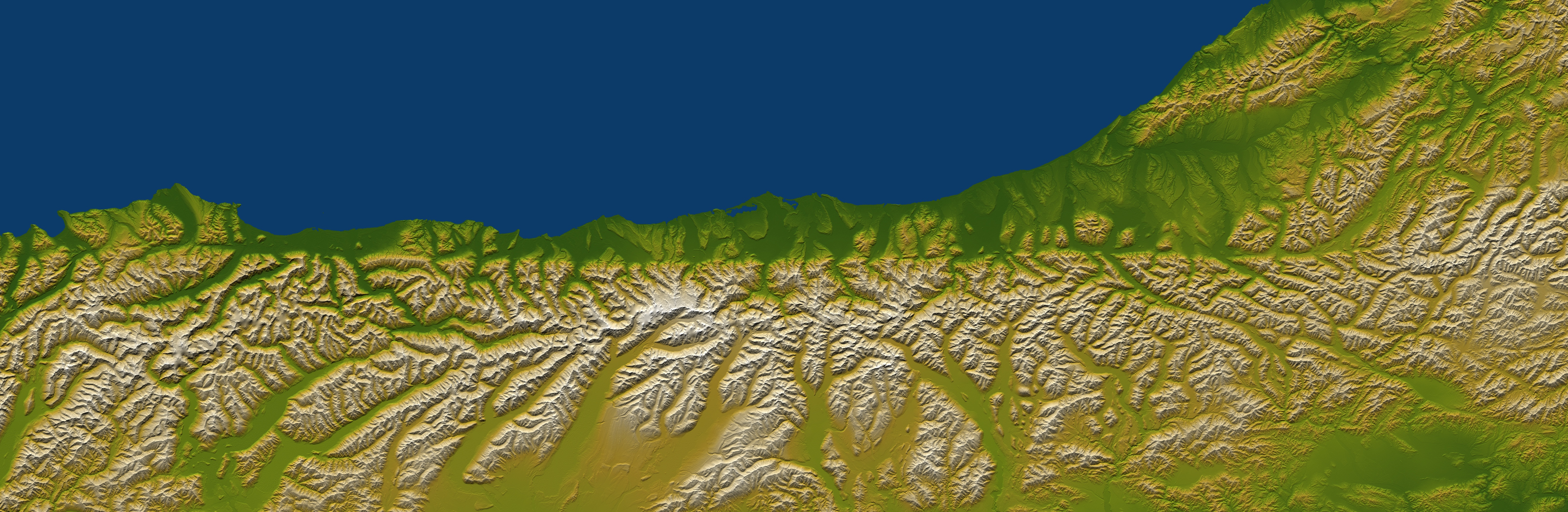
Elevation map of the west coast of New Zealand's South Island showing the sharp line formed by the Alpine Fault. North is to the right.

The West Coast region extends from the Southern Alps' main divide to the western coast of the South Island. The Southern Alps gets progressively further from the coast, from the south of the region where the mountains meet the sea, to the north where several other rangers of mountains are between the Southern Alps and the coast. In the central section there is typically a plain between the Alps and the sea which is broken by glacial moraines and isolated hills, made of more resistant granite.

The uplift of the Southern Alps on the Alpine Fault has led to greater precipitation in the West Coast region. This has increased erosion which has isostatically increased uplift. This uplift is greatest in the centre of the fault where New Zealand's highest mountain, Mt Cook, is found.

The chemical erosion of limestone forms a Karst topography along the coastal part of the northern half of the region.

== Basement terranes west of the Alpine Fault ==
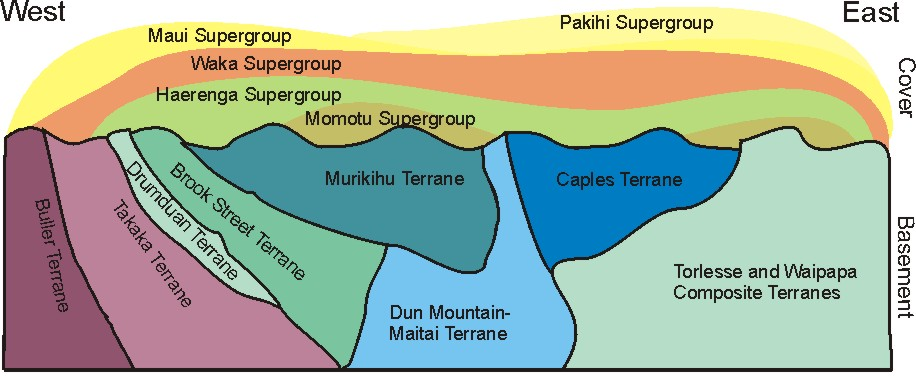
Cartoon cross-section of New Zealand stratigraphy. Cenozoic deformation has been removed for clarity.

=== Tākaka Terrane ===
The Tākaka Terrane contains a vast variety of different sedimentary and igneous rocks and ranges in age from the Cambrian to Devonian. In the West Coast region it outcrops in the north within the Kahurangi National Park. This terrane contains New Zealand's oldest rocks.

=== Buller Terrane ===
The Buller Terrane is composed of Ordovician to Devonian greywacke which has locally been metamorphosed to gneiss. The terrane is composed of the Golden Bay, Greenland and Reefton groups. The Greenland Group has been metamorphosed to form the Pecksniff Metasedimentary Gneiss. The common name for these is the 'Charleston Gneiss' and it was thought for most of the 20th century that these were the oldest rocks in the country. The Buller Terrane, particularly the Greenland Group is the most common basement unit west of the Alpine Fault on the West Coast.

=== Median tectonic zone ===
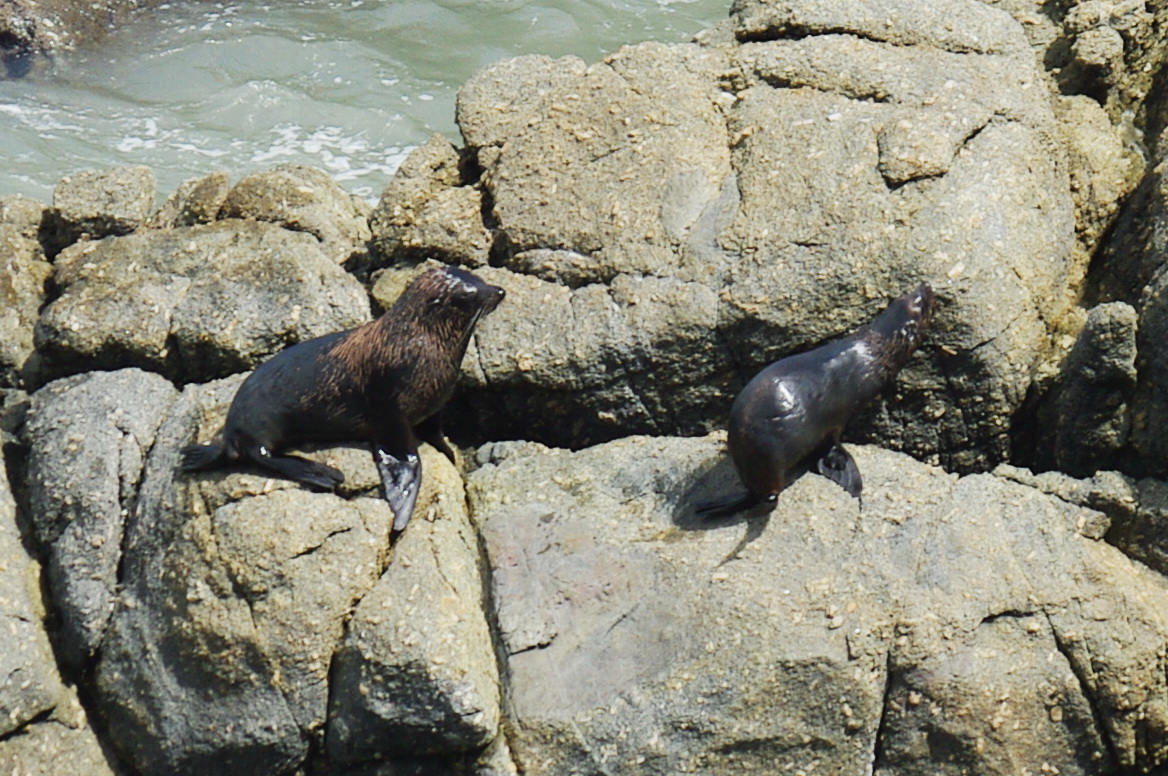
Karamea Suite granite, Cape Foulwind

This is series of typically arc related Carboniferous to early Cretaceous plutones that intrude both the eastern and western provinces and are concentrated along the boundary of the two. Along the West Coast the various intrusions include the Karamea Granite and the Rahu, Separation Point and Darran suites. These intrusions have two distinct age ranges, Late Devonian to Carboniferous and Early Cretaceous.

== Basement terranes east of the Alpine Fault ==
=== Alpine Schist ===
The Alpine Schist gets progressively higher grade as it approaches the Alpine Fault from the east. Near the Alpine Fault Granite pegmatites and mylonites are present.

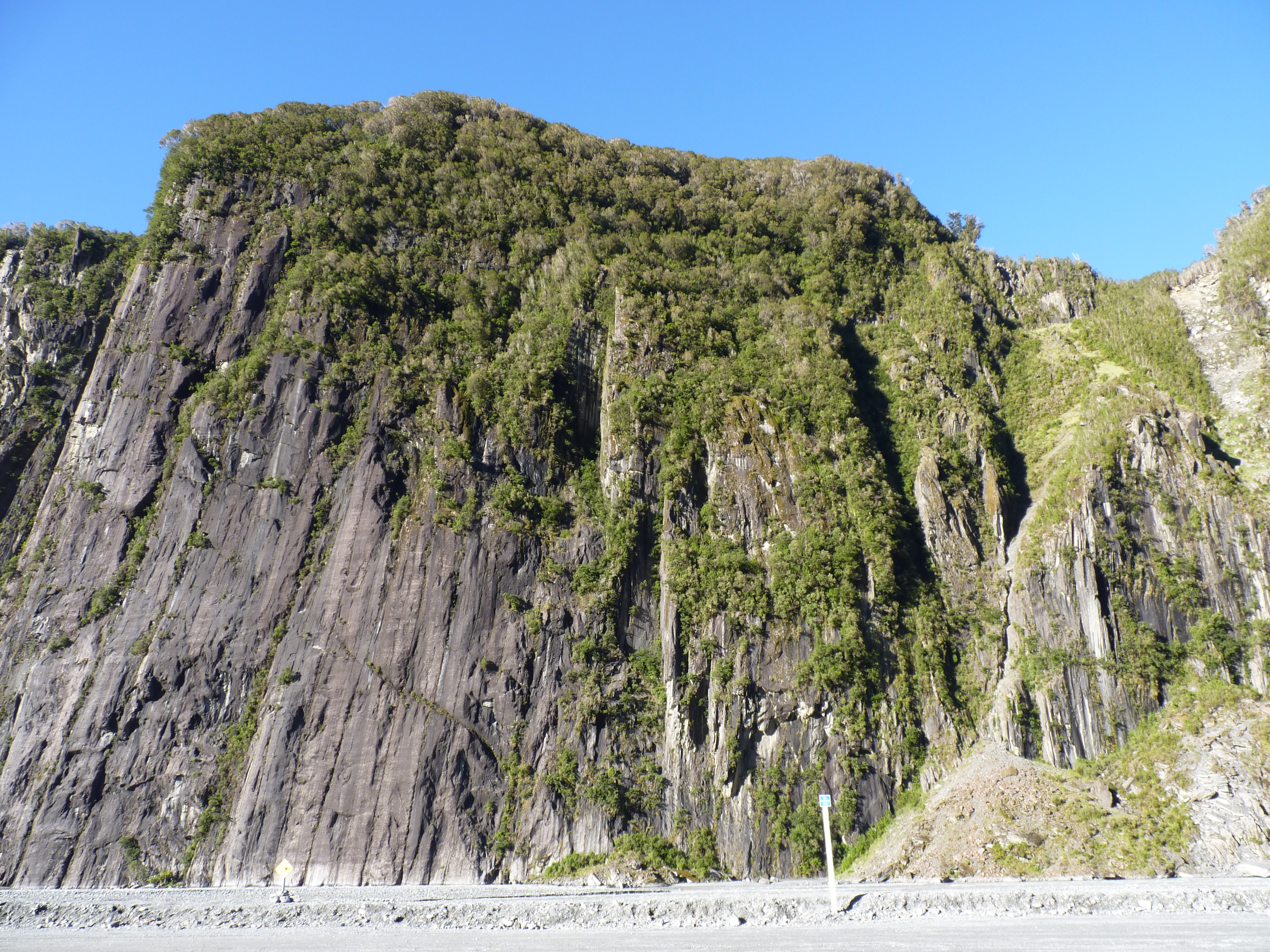
Alpine Schist, Fox Glacier, New Zealand

=== Other Eastern Province terranes ===
In the far south of the West Coast region, south of Jackson Bay, a number of other basement terranes are present. From West to East these are the Drumduan, Brook Street, Murihiku, Dun Mountain–Maitai, Caples, Aspiring terranes. Near the Alpine Fault these terranes are overprinted by the Alpine schist.

== Cover sequence ==
East of the Alpine Fault almost all the cover sequence has been eroded due to the high uplift rate. West of the Alpine Fault is a sedimentary sequence representing a marine regression.

=== Terrestrial breccia and coal measures (Cretaceous to Eocene) ===
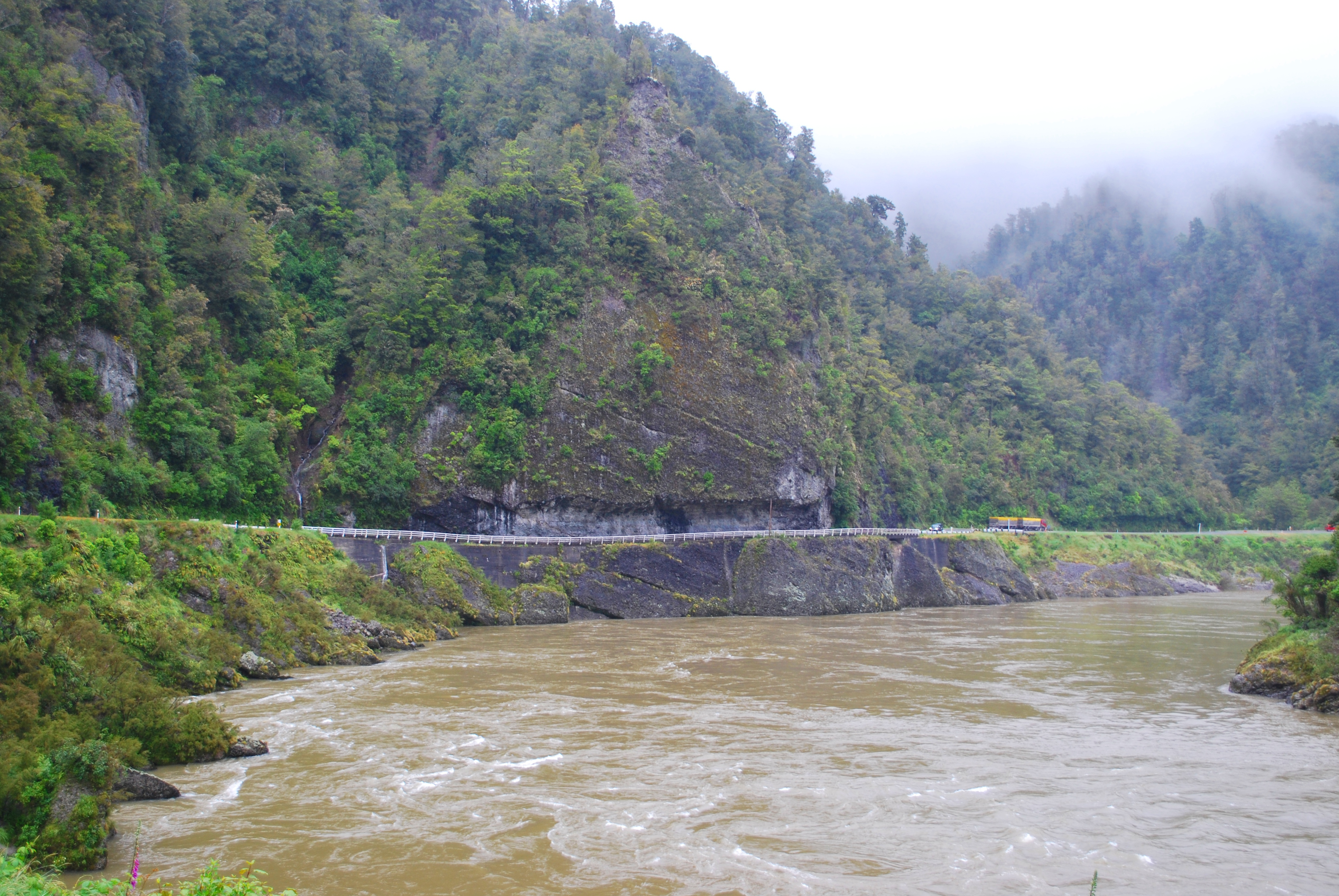
Hawks Crag Breccia, Hawks Crag, Buller River

Unconformably overlying the basement rocks west of the Alpine Fault is a terrestrial sequence that represents Zealandia's progressive movement away from Gondwana. The Hawks Crag Breccia formed from erosion off fault scarps. It is also New Zealand's best source of uranium. These are then overlain by coal measures formed in swamps from the continued extension. These include both the Paparoa and Brunner Coal Measures, which are being extensively mined.

=== Marine sediments (Oligocene to Miocene) ===
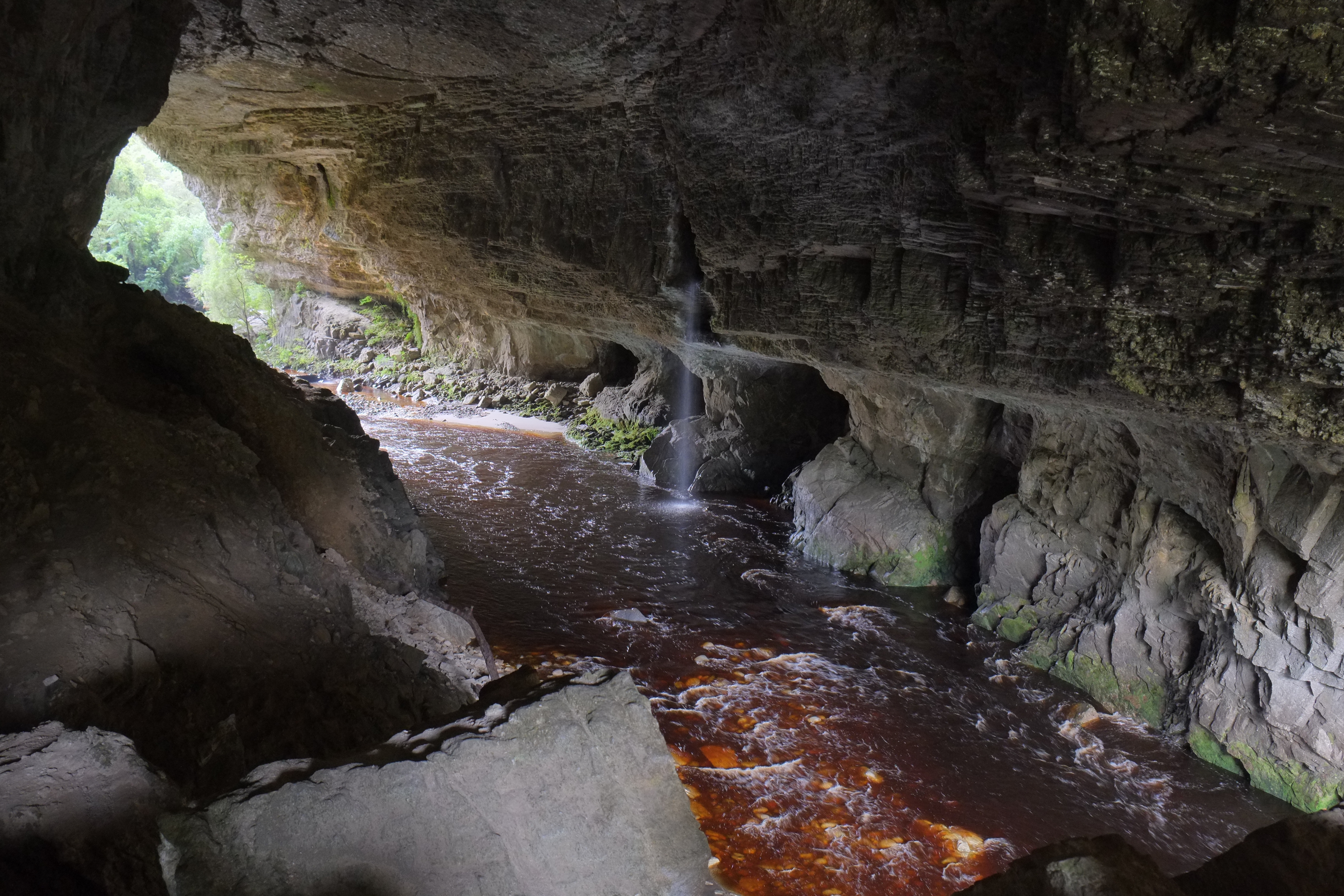
Inside the Oparara Arch. Karamea Suite granite at the base and a limestone roof.

As extension and subsidence continued the West Coast region was covered with marine sediments in the Oligocene. These included limestone and calcareous mudstones. By the early Miocene the Alpine Fault had become active and a small degree of uplift lead to the formation of some coal measures.

=== Alluvium (Quaternary) ===
From the continued uplift of the Southern Alps and it's erosion a thick sequence of alluvium was created forming the plains of the West Coast. These are also associated with a series of glacial sediments.

== Economic Geology ==
The West Coast has both hard rock and alluvial gold. Significant coal deposits are found in the north of region. Jade is found in the central region from the Alpine Schist and in the south of the region from the Dun Mountain–Maitai terrane.

== Natural Hazards ==
The Alpine Fault represents the most significant risk on the West Coast and has a 30% chance of generating a magnitude 8 earthquake in the next 50 years.

== Tourism ==
The glaciers that have formed near sea level due to the high precipitation and the Pancake rocks and Oparara Arches are erosional Karst features that have become tourist attractions.

== See also ==
- Geology of New Zealand
- List of rock formations of New Zealand
- Stratigraphy of New Zealand
