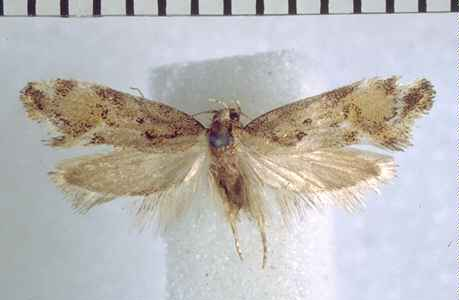
- Male holotype

Scientific classification
- Kingdom: Animalia
- Phylum: Arthropoda
- Class: Insecta
- Order: Lepidoptera
- Family: Oecophoridae
- Genus: Tingena
- Species: T. morosa

Binomial name
- Tingena morosa (Philpott, 1926)

Synonyms
- Borkhausenia morosa Philpott, 1926

= Tingena morosa =

Species of moth, endemic to New Zealand

Tingena morosa is a species of moth in the family Oecophoridae. It is endemic to New Zealand and has been found in the South Island in Nelson including at the Dun Mountain and in the Canterbury region. This species inhabits native forest at altitudes from 2000 to 3000 ft. Adults of this species are on the wing in December.

== Taxonomy ==
This species was first described by Alfred Philpott using specimens collected in Nelson and at Dun Mountain. Philpott originally named the species Borkhausenia morosa. George Hudson discussed this species in his 1928 book The butterflies and moths of New Zealand under that name. In 1988 J. S. Dugdale placed this species in the genus Tingena. The male holotype specimen, collected at Dun Mountain, is held in the New Zealand Arthropod Collection.

== Description ==
Philpott described this species as follows:

♂ ♀. 13–15 mm. Head and thorax grey. Palpi ochreous, second segment outwardly dark fuscous and terminal segment with fuscous supra-basal ring and irregular markings. Antennae grey. Abdomen fuscous-grey. Legs whitish-ochreous, anterior pairs infuscated. Forewings elongate, costa slightly arched, apex obtuse, termen slightly rounded, oblique; markings very obscure and irregular, frequently absent; a suffused blackish-fuscous fascia from costa at base to above dorsum at ⅓. enclosing the ochreous or yellow plical stigma and usually anteriorly margined with yellowish; an interrupted black or dark-fuscous straight fascia from costa at ½, coalescing with first fascia above dorsum, posteriorly margined with white and including the first discal stigma; an undefined blackish fascia from beyond middle to tornus, usually enclosing some ochreous scales in disc; a white subterminal line interruptedly margined on both sides with blackish; frequently a considerable irroration of yellowish on apical area: fringes fuscous-grey mixed with blackish. Hind-wings and fringes pale fuscous-grey.

== Distribution ==
This species is endemic to New Zealand and has been observed in the Nelson region, at Dun Mountain, and in the Canterbury region.

== Behaviour ==
Adults of this species are on the wing in December.

== Habitat ==
This species inhabits native forest at altitudes from 2000 to 3000 ft.
