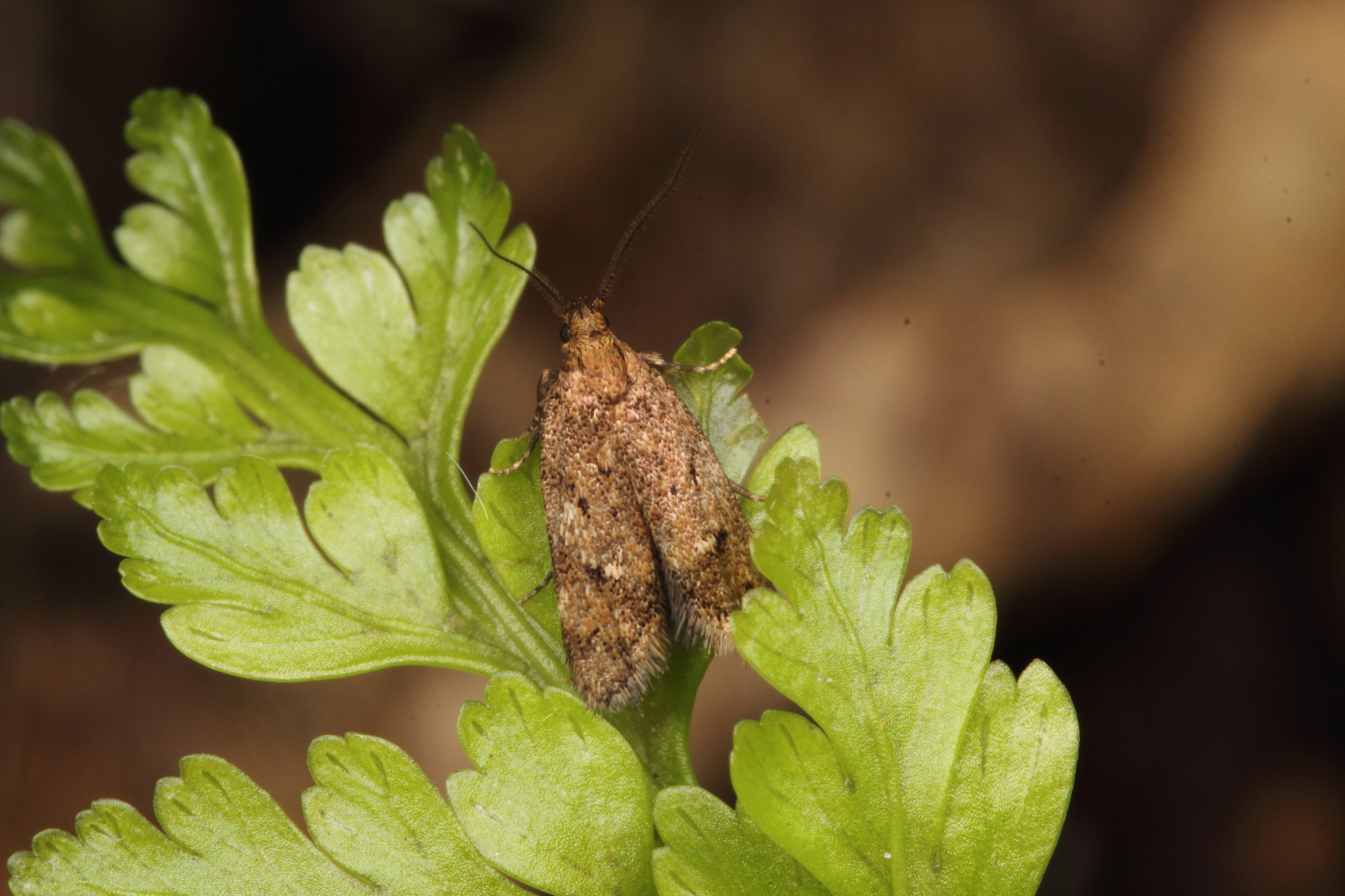

Scientific classification
- Kingdom: Animalia
- Phylum: Arthropoda
- Class: Insecta
- Order: Lepidoptera
- Family: Oecophoridae
- Genus: Tingena
- Species: T. fenestrata

Binomial name
- Tingena fenestrata (Philpott, 1926)

Synonyms
- Borkhausenia fenestrata Philpott, 1926

= Tingena fenestrata =

Species of moth, endemic to New Zealand

Tingena fenestrata is a species of moth in the family Oecophoridae. It is endemic to New Zealand and has been observed in the South Island. This species has been observed in native forest habitat in December.

== Taxonomy ==
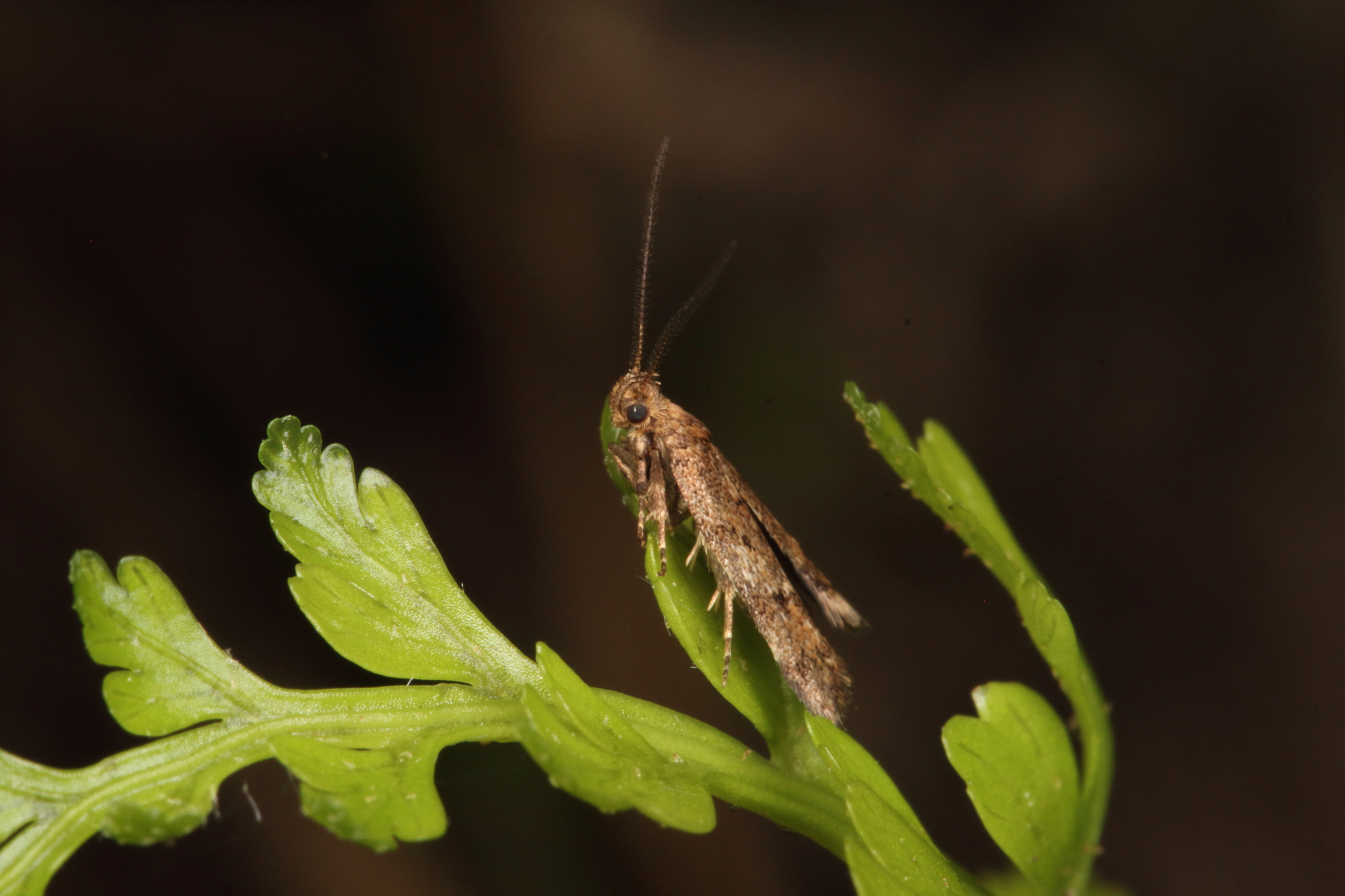
Tingena fenestrata observation

This species was first described by Alfred Philpott in 1926 using specimens collected at Dun Mountain and named Borkhausenia fenestrata. George Hudson discussed this species under the name B. fenestrata in his 1928 publication The butterflies and moths of New Zealand. In 1988 J. S. Dugdale placed this species within the genus Tingena. The male holotype is held in the New Zealand Arthropod Collection. Dr Robert Hoare has communicated that this species may belong to the genus Mermeristis.

== Description ==
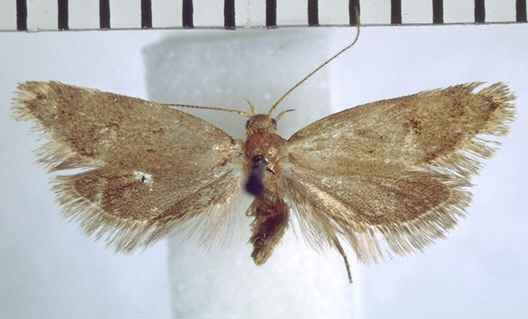
Tingena fenestrata holotype

Philpott described this species as follows:

♂ ♀. 10 ½–12 mm. Head dull brown, mixed with ochreous posteriorly. Palpi bright ochreous mixed with brown. Antennae brown annulated with ochreous, ciliations in male 2 ½. Thorax bronzy-brown. Abdomen pale bronzy-brown. Legs pale ochreous mixed with brown, tarsi obscurely annulated with paler. Forewings moderate, costa moderately arched, apex obtuse, termen rounded, oblique; pale dull-brown; first discal indicated by a few scattered brownish-black scales; plical obliquely beyond first discal, very small, sometimes consisting of one scale only; second discal larger, lower half white; a very obscure irregular dark-brown subterminal line: fringes dull-brownish mixed with pale ochreous and darker brown. Hindwings bronzy-fuscous: fringes fuscous-grey with darker basal line.

== Distribution ==
This species is endemic to New Zealand and has been observed in the South Island.

== Behaviour ==
This species is on the wing in December.

== Habitat ==
This species has been observed in native forest habitat.
