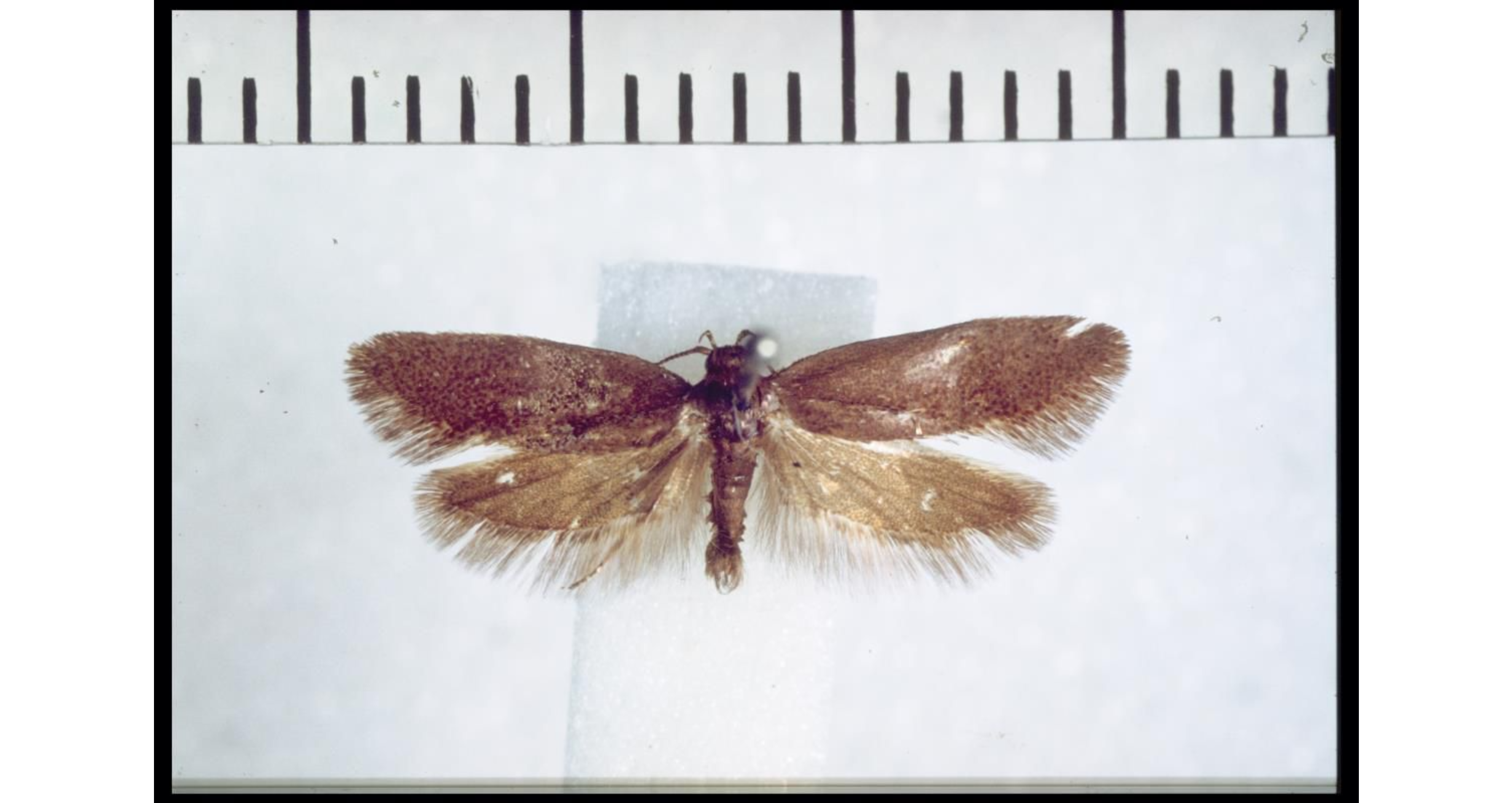
- Male holotype

Scientific classification
- Kingdom: Animalia
- Phylum: Arthropoda
- Class: Insecta
- Order: Lepidoptera
- Family: Oecophoridae
- Genus: Tingena
- Species: T. afflicta

Binomial name
- Tingena afflicta (Philpott, 1926)

Synonyms
- Borkhausenia afflicta Philpott, 1926

= Tingena afflicta =

Species of moth, endemic to New Zealand

Tingena afflicta is a species of moth in the family Oecophoridae. It is endemic to New Zealand.

== Taxonomy ==
This species was first described by Alfred Philpott in 1926 using specimens collected by himself in forest on the Dun Mountain track in November and named Borkhausenia afflicta. George Hudson discussed this species under the name B. affinis in his 1928 publication The butterflies and moths of New Zealand. In 1988 J. S. Dugdale placed this species within the genus Tingena. The male holotype is held in the New Zealand Arthropod Collection.

== Description ==
Philpott described the adults of this species as follows:

♂. 13½—14½ mm. Head, antennae, and thorax shining dark purplish-fuscous, antennal ciliations in male 3, whorled. Palpi shining dark purplish-fuscous, second segment ochreous within. Abdomen dark fuscous. Legs whitish ochreous, strongly infuscated, tarsi obscurely annulated with ochreous. Forewings moderate, hardly dilated, costa moderately arched, apex rounded, termen hardly rounded, oblique; dark fuscous, slightly purplish; a patch of yellow scales round base of dorsum, sometimes mixed with orange but frequently absent altogether; sometimes a few similar scales on base of costa; from middle of dorsum a band of white to orange scales rises and curves down again to dorsum; frequently there are no markings or only a few coloured scales: fringes dark fuscous. Hindwings dark bronzy-fuscous: fringes dark greyish-fuscous with darker basal line.
♀. 13–15 ½ mm. Head and antennae fuscous mixed with ochreous. Palpi whitish ochreous, outwardly more or less infuscated. Thorax and abdomen bronzy-fuscous. Legs ochreous, anterior pair infuscated. Fore-wings, contour as in male; greyish-fuscous, densely irrorated with yellow, ochreous, and orange, the colour being brightest on and below fold near base; fringes grey-fuscous mixed with ochreous. Hindwings as in male but rather paler.

== Distribution ==
This species is endemic to New Zealand.
