= Geology of the Tasman District =

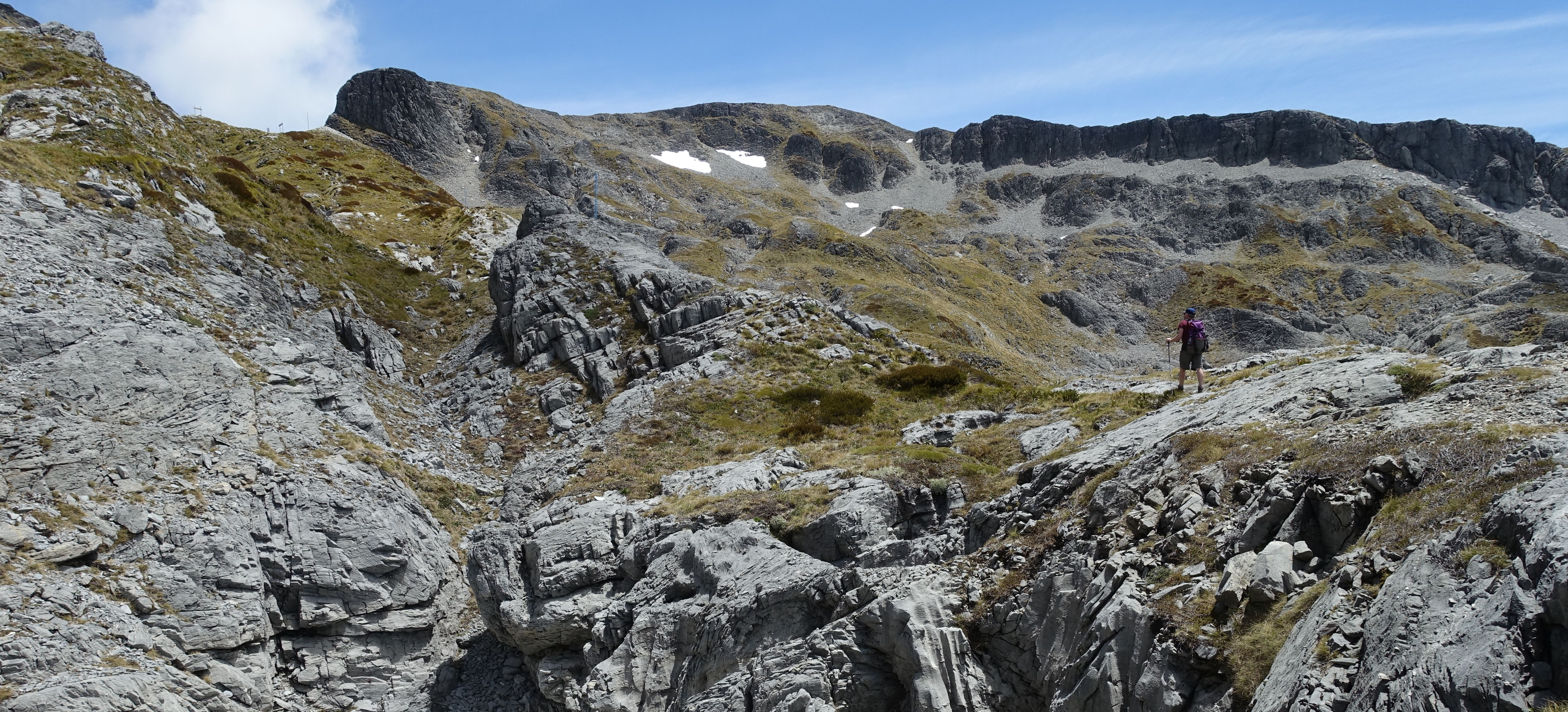
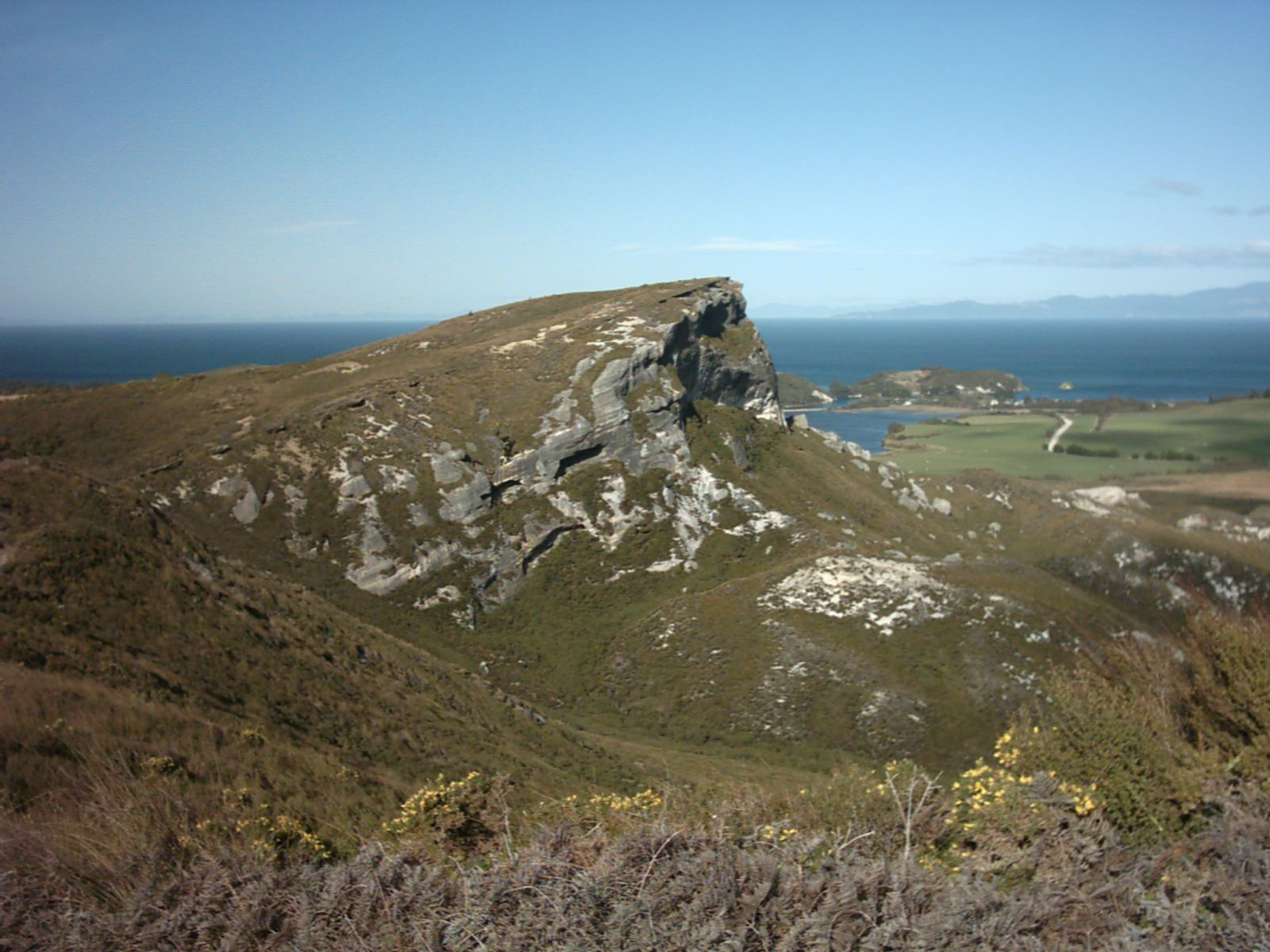
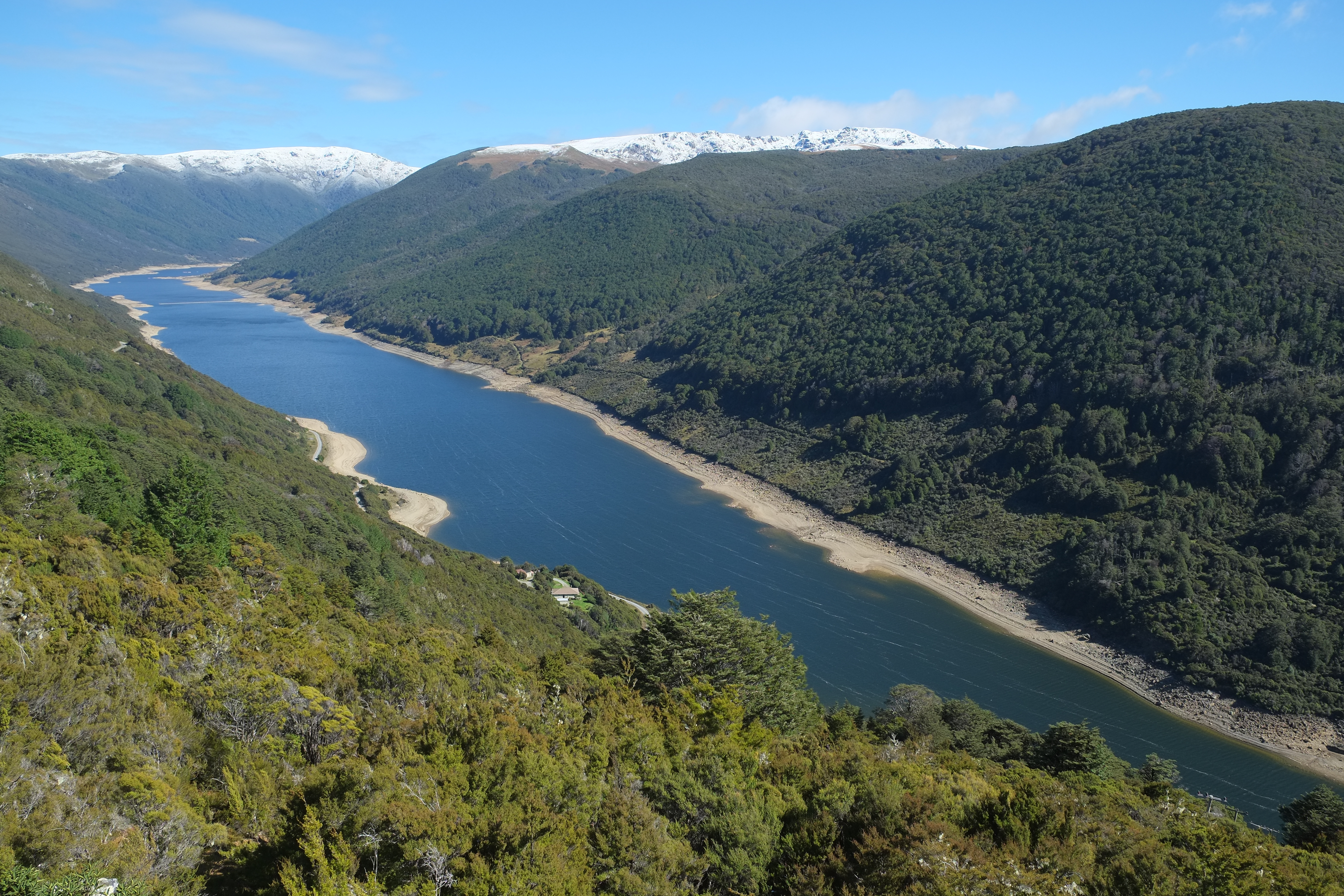
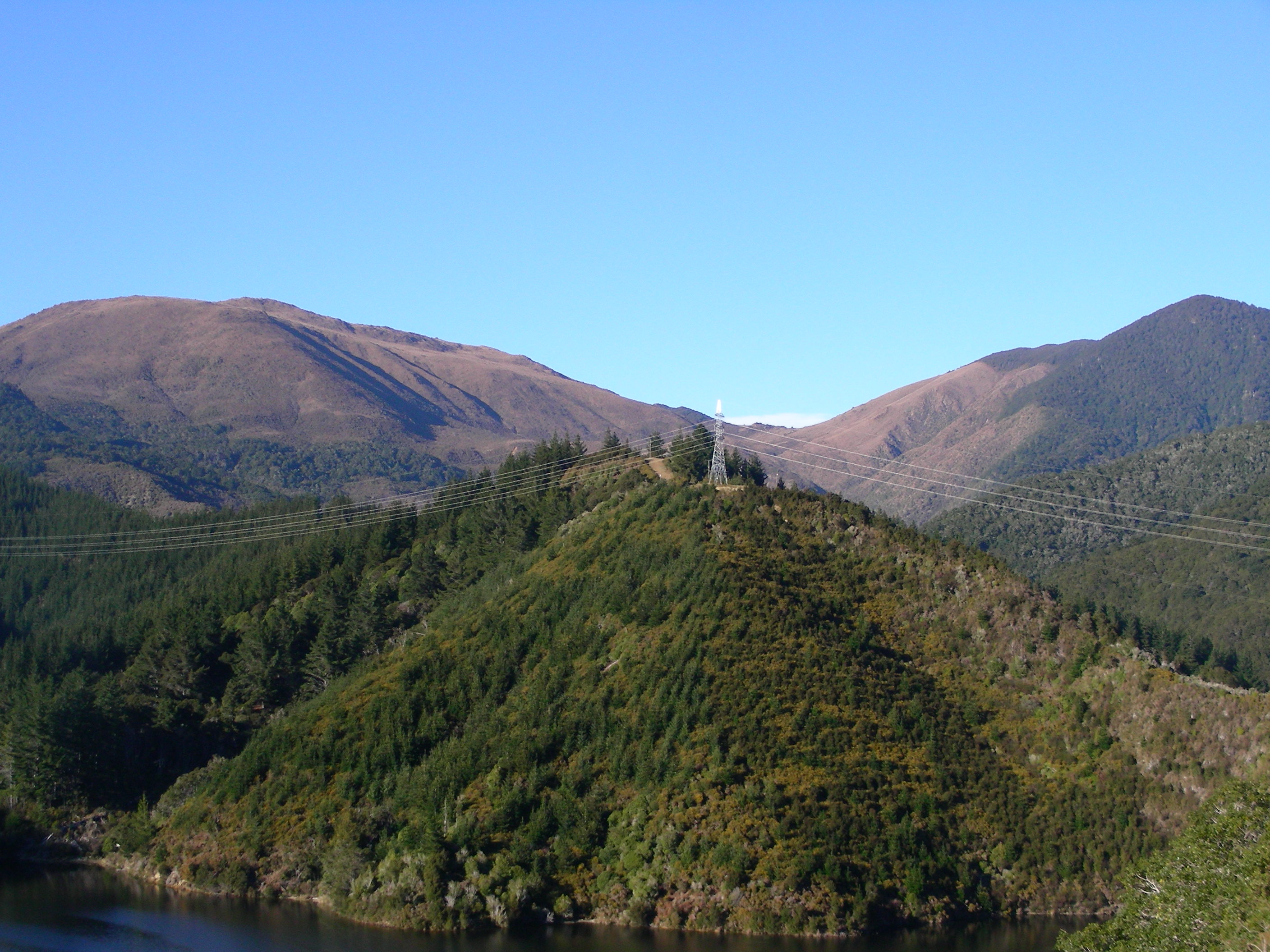
Clockwise, Mount Arthur marble, Old Man Range near Farewell Spit, Dun Mountain, Cobb Valley

The Tasman region, and the small adjoining Nelson region, form one of the more geologically interesting regions of New Zealand. It contains the oldest rocks of anywhere on New Zealand's main islands. It contains all the main terranes that make up New Zealand's basement. These basement rocks include Ultramafic rocks, such as Serpentine and Dunite, and valuable minerals, such as Gold. The Nelson region is bordered to the south by the Alpine Fault (usually named the Wairau Fault in the Wairau Valley), the main fault forming the boundary between the Pacific Plate and the Indo-Australian Plate, that generated the Southern Alps.

== Basement rocks ==
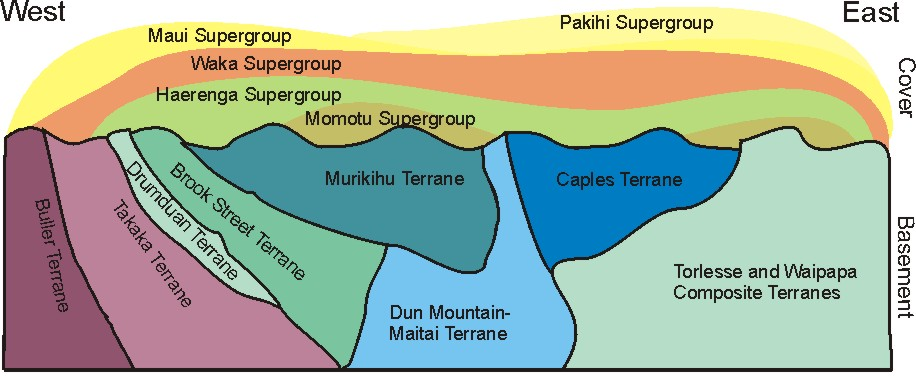
Cartoon cross-section of New Zealand stratigraphy. Cenozoic deformation has been removed for clarity.

The terranes that make up New Zealand's basement are divided up into a Western Province, composed of the Buller and Tākaka terranes, and an Eastern Province, composed of the Brook Street, Murihiku, Dun Mountain–Maitai, Caples, Torlesse composite (Rakaia and Pahau), and Waipapa composite terranes. The Median Batholith forms the boundary between the two provinces. All these terranes occur within or near the Nelson region.

The Buller terrane forms the basement rocks to the west of the Anatoki Fault (roughly from Whanganui Inlet to Springs Junction), and throughout the West Coast, west of the Alpine Fault, to Milford Sound. The Greenland Group rocks form the base, and are composed of sandstones and mudstones deposited in a submarine fan environment (Late Cambrian-early Ordovician, 505–470 Ma). They are overlain by the Golden Bay Group rocks, composed of quartz sandstone and shale (Ordovician, 490–443 Ma).

The Tākaka terrane forms the basement rocks east of the Anatoki Fault and west of Tākaka, the Authur and Matiri Range, south to Springs Junction. The Tākaka terrane is structurally complex, and heavily faulted. The earliest (Middle Cambrian, 518–515 Ma, mostly western) rocks were deposited in an oceanic volcanic arc environment, and represent the oldest rocks in the main islands of New Zealand. Rocks in the Cobb Valley include gabbro and ultramafic rocks that are now largely serpentised. Later (Late Cambrian-Early Devonian, 500–397 Ma, mostly eastern) rocks were deposited in a passive margin environment, and include the Mount Arthur limestone and marble.

The Buller and Tākaka terranes are believed to have been amalgamated around Early or Middle Devonian times, about 390 Ma ago. After amalgamation, in Late Devonian times (370–354 Ma), the Karamea Suite granites were intruded into the Buller terrane. The Karamea Suite granite often has a distinctive pink colour, due to the K-feldspar megacrysts.

The Median Batholith forms the rocks between the Western and Eastern Provinces. It is assumed to represent a long lived (Late Devonian-Early Cretaceous, 375–110 Ma) Cordilleran batholith, corresponding to a subduction zone along the margin of eastern Australia, before the formation of the Tasman Sea (83–55 Ma). The Median Batholith includes the Riwaka Complex (~375 Ma) and Separation Point Suite (~110 Ma). The Riwaka Complex intruded rocks on the west of Abel Tasman National Park, south to the Baton River Area. The Separation Point Suite corresponds to the granite rocks from Abel Tasman National Park, south to Springs Junction. The basement rocks between Motueka and Nelson, south to Nelson Lakes, are also part of the Median Batholith, but are mainly hidden by the Moutere Depression. However, the Median Batholith outcrops around Peppin Island-Nelson City and Nelson Lakes.

The Eastern Province Brook Street, Murihiku, and Dun Mountain-Maitai Central Arc terranes form narrow successively more easterly strips to the east of the Waimea-Flaxmore Fault System, running from Durville Island in the north, to the Alpine Fault near Nelson Lakes in the south.

The Brook Street terrane corresponds to a Permian (300–250 Ma) oceanic island arc, and contains well-preserved cross sections through volcanic cones.

The Murihiku terrane is composed of Triassic to Jurassic (250–145 Ma), relatively undeformed marine sandstone, derived from a volcanic arc.

The Dun Mountain–Maitai terrane includes the early Permian (290–256 Ma) Dun Mountain ophiolite belt, composed of mafic sea floor basalts and ultramafic mantle rocks. The high nickel and magnesium content inhibits the growth of vegetation on Dun Mountain and Red Hills. These are overlain by early Permian to Triassic (290–206 Ma) Maitai Group breccia, sandstone, siltstone and limestone.

The Caples terrane forms much of the Marlborough Sounds, from east of D'Urville Island, to west of Charlotte Sound, and southwest to Nelson Lakes and the Alpine Fault (Wairau Valley). The Caples terrane was formed in Late Permian to Middle Triassic times (256–227 Ma). The rocks are mostly sandstone and argillite, deposited in a submarine fan, adjacent to an island arc, which have been metamorphosed to schist close to the boundary with the Rakaia terrane in the southeast.

The Torlesse (Composite) Terane is composed of the Rakaia and Pahau terranes. The rocks are mostly marine sandstone and mudstone, with the Pahau terrane being younger (Late Jurassic to Early Cretaceous, 159–99 Ma) than the Rakaia terrane (Permian to Late Triassic, 290–206 Ma). The Aspiring Lithologic Association schist, south of the Caples terrane and north of the Alpine Fault, is regarded as belonging to the Rakaia terrane. The rocks to the south of the Alpine Fault belong to the Torlesse composite terrane (Rakaia to the west of Nelson Lakes, Pahau to the east).

The Waipapa (composite) terrane is composed of the Hunua and Morrinsville terranes. The rocks around Picton–Arapawa Island are thought to belong to the Morrinsville terrane, and are late Triassic (227–206 Ma) sandstone that has been metamorphosed into schist.

The rocks of western Nelson used to be adjacent to those in Fiordland and Central Otago, before the Alpine Fault was activated in the Early Miocene (23 Ma). The terranes in Nelson match those on the other side of the Alpine Fault, in Fiordland and Central Otago.

== Coal and limestone ==
Most of the Nelson area was above sea level from Late Cretaceous to Middle Eocene time. Coal measures developed in swampland around the Whanganui Inlet in the Late Cretaceous. The coal measures were later covered by sandstone, then conglomerate, corresponding to a braided floodplain. Much of the cover rocks have since been eroded.

Coal measures also developed in swampland over much of western Nelson in Late Eocene times (40–34 Ma). The coal measures are preserved in the Buller Coalfield, the Heaphy River, Tākaka, and Richmond. The land then sank, the sea transgressed, and calcareous sandstone, mudstone, and limestone were deposited in Oligocene times (34–24 Ma).

== Uplift ==
The Alpine Fault developed in Early Miocene times (23 Ma), uplift occurred, and deposition changed from limestone to mudstone. Rapid uplift of the Southern Alps occurred in the Late Pliocene (3 Ma). Large quantities of Torlesse derived gravel were generated from the Southern Alps, and are preserved in the Moutere Depression.

== Current movement ==
The Alpine Fault is moving at 3–5 mm/yr, and the Awatere Fault at 6–8 mm/yr. The Waimea-Flaxmore Fault System is also active. The Marlborough Sounds are sinking 1–7 mm/yr. Nelson itself is relatively stable, and the western coast is rising 0–1 mm/yr.

== Geological resources ==
Alluvial gold has been obtained in the Anatoki, Tākaka, Aorere and Paparoa valleys of Golden Bay. Gold has been mined in the Aorangi Mine (Golden Blocks) area, and Johnston's United Mine area. It has also been mined within the Caples terrane schist.

Chromium and copper have been mined in the Dun Mountain Ophiolite Belt.

Asbestos, talc and magnesite have been mined in the Cobb area.

Coal has been mined in Collingwood, Tākaka, Nelson-Richmond, Baton, Heaphy, Karamea and Buller areas.

Mount Arthur marble is used for buildings. Tertiary limestone is quarried to make cement.

The sea to the northwest of the Nelson region is believed to have the potential for oil and gas.

== Geological hazards ==
The main geological hazard is from earthquakes along the Alpine Fault or related faults. Earthquakes in surrounding areas, such as Murchison, Kaikoura, and Wellington also have the potential for damage.

== Geological sites of interest ==
The Cobb Valley, with mafic and ultramafic rocks, serpentine, talc, and asbestos are of great interest.

Abel Tasman National Park is of interest for limestone and marble, Separation Point granite, and the Riwaka Complex diorite and gabbro. From the top of the park, it is possible to see Harwoods Hole, a large vertical shaft that goes down to the limestone cave system of Tākaka Hill.

The Arthur Range is the prime spot to see Mount Arthur marble.

The Central Arc terranes are visible within the Bryant Range. Red Hill and Dun Mountain display the effects of ultramafic rocks on vegetation.

A trip on the inter-island ferry provides a good way to see the Marlborough Sounds.

The Alpine Fault can be seen in the Wairau Valley, between Blenheim and Nelson Lakes.

The effects of glaciation can be seen around Nelson Lakes.

== Maps ==
Geological maps of New Zealand can be obtained from the New Zealand Institute of Geological and Nuclear Science (GNS Science), a New Zealand Government Research Institute.

GNS provides a free Map of New Zealand's Geological Foundations.

The main maps are the 1: 250 000 QMap series, which will be completed as a series of 21 maps and booklets in 2010. Low resolution versions of these maps (without the associated booklet) can be downloaded from the GNS site for free.

The map for the Nelson Area was published in 1998. The map for the Wellington Area was published in 2000. The map for the Greymouth Area was published in 2002. The map for the Kaikoura Area was published in 2006.

== See also ==
- Geology of New Zealand
- Geology and geomorphology of Kahurangi National Park
- List of rock formations of New Zealand
- Marlborough Fault System
- Stratigraphy of New Zealand
