= Tākaka terrane =

Terrane in Tasman, New Zealand

- Stratigraphic range: Cambrian-Devonian; ~510–400 Ma
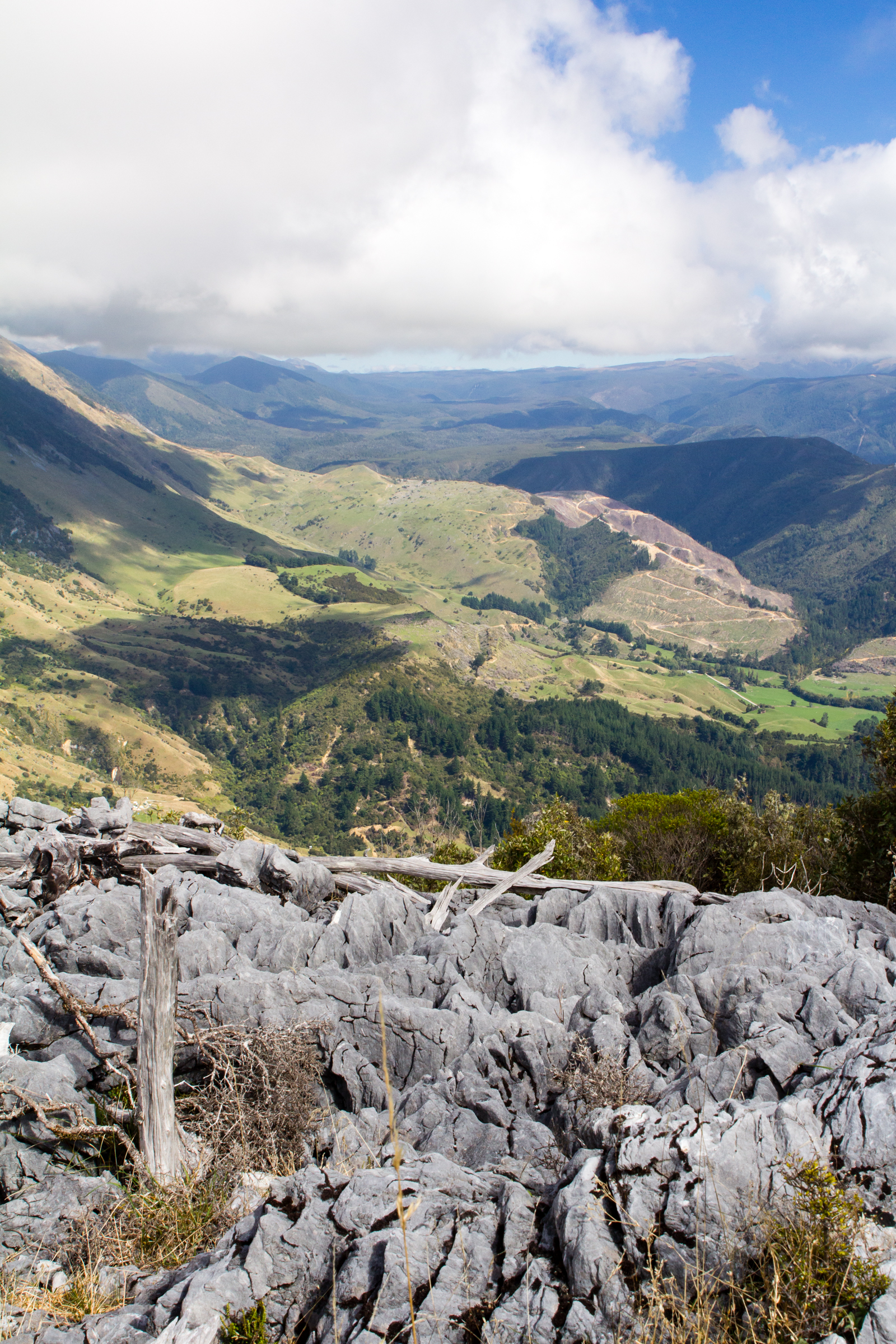
- Type: Terrane
- Unit of: Austral Superprovince; Western Province
- Sub-units: Haupiri, Devil River Volcanics, Mount Patriarch, Mount Arthur, Ellis, Edgecumbe, Cameron & Pegasus Groups
- Underlies: Tuhua Intrusive, Waka & Haerenga Supergroups

Lithology
- Primary: Sandstone, marble, basalt

Location
- Coordinates: 41.1°S 172.8°E
- Region: Tasman District
- Country: New Zealand

Type section
- Named for: Tākaka Hill
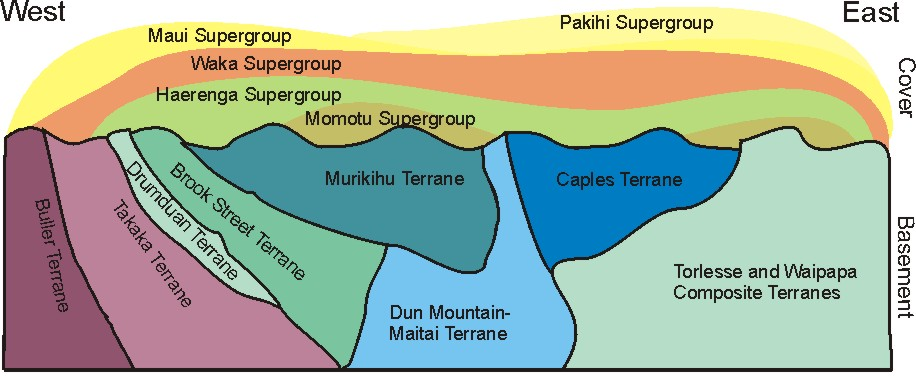
- Cross-section of New Zealand's stratigraphy

The Tākaka terrane is a Paleozoic terrane that outcrops in the South Island of New Zealand. It is most extensively exposed within the Kahurangi National Park in the Tasman District. The terrane is mostly made up of marble and volcanic rocks, but is highly variable in composition. It ranges in age from mid-Cambrian to Devonian time (510–400 Ma), including New Zealand's oldest rocks, which are found in the Cobb Valley in north-west Nelson. The Cobb Valley is also the location of "Trilobite Rock", a glacial dropstone made from the moulted exoskeletons of trilobites. Asbestos was mined in the Cobb Valley from the Tākaka terrane between the late 1880s and 1917. The Tākaka terrane is highly deformed and has been intruded by many batholiths.

== Description ==
The Tākaka terrane has two main igneous units, the arc-related Devil River Volcanics Group (Middle to Late Cambrian) and the rift‐related Gendarme Dolerite (latest Cambrian to Early Ordovician age). The Devil River Volcanics Group sediments contain trilobites, brachiopods and conodonts. Sedimentary units in the Tākaka terrane (Haupiri Group and Junction Formation rocks) likely formed in a back-arc basin. The distinctive Arthur Marble from Tākaka Hill and Mount Arthur is of Ordovician age. It has been speculated that the Tākaka terrane is equivalent to rocks in Tasmania, Australia and was separated from them with the opening of the Tasman Sea.

The Arthur Marble has been chemically weathered by rain and groundwater due to its high calcium carbonate content forming a karst geomorphology. This has led to the formation of extensive cave systems like Harwoods Hole and the Riuwaka Resurgence.

== See also ==
- Tākaka marble
- Geology of the Tasman District
- Stratigraphy of New Zealand
  - Torlesse composite terrane
  - Dun Mountain–Maitai terrane
