= Torlesse composite terrane =

Terrane found in New Zealand

- Stratigraphic range: Carboniferous-Cretaceous; ~320–130 Ma
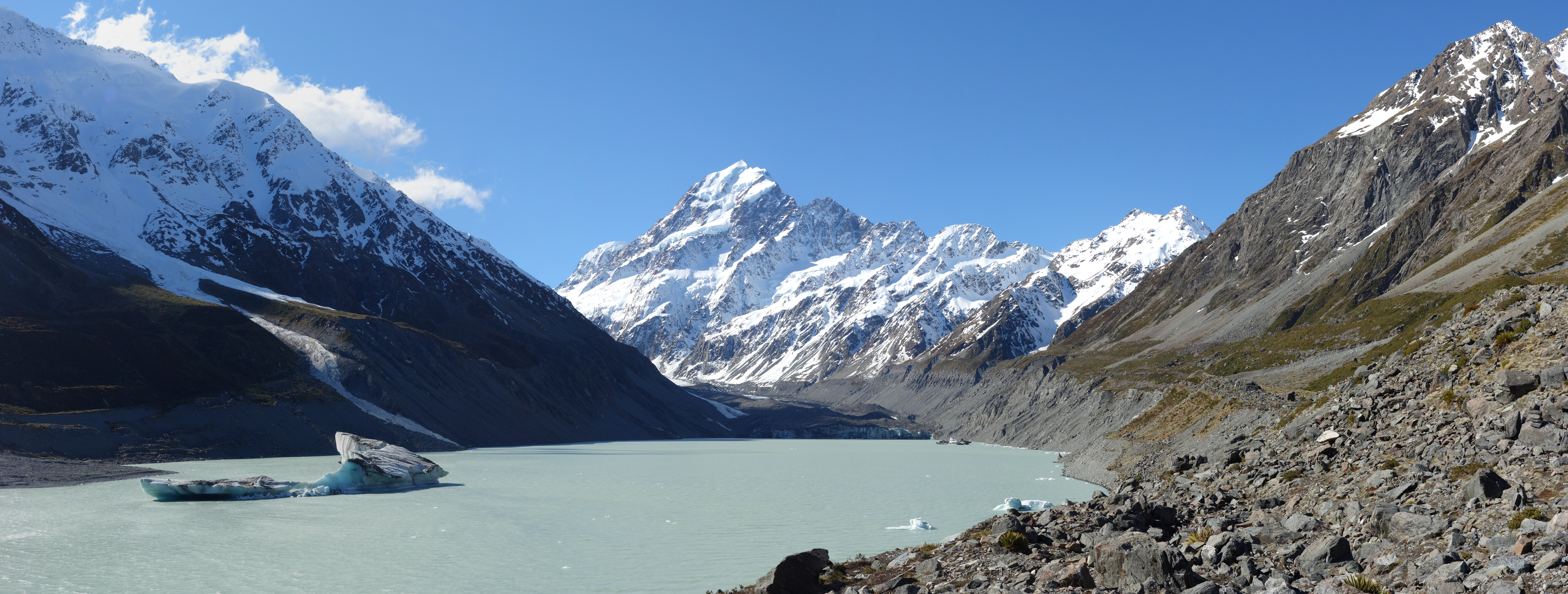
- View of Torless composite terrane at Aoraki / Mount Cook
- Type: Terrane
- Unit of: Austral superprovince
- Sub-units: Kaweka, Rakaia & Pahau terranes, Esk Head Belt, Pahaoa & Clent Hills Groups
- Underlies: Caples terrane, Momotu, Waka & Haerenga Supergroups

Lithology
- Primary: Greywacke, schist, basalt

Location
- Region: Canterbury, Marlborough & Otago regions
- Country: New Zealand

Type section
- Named for: Torlesse Range
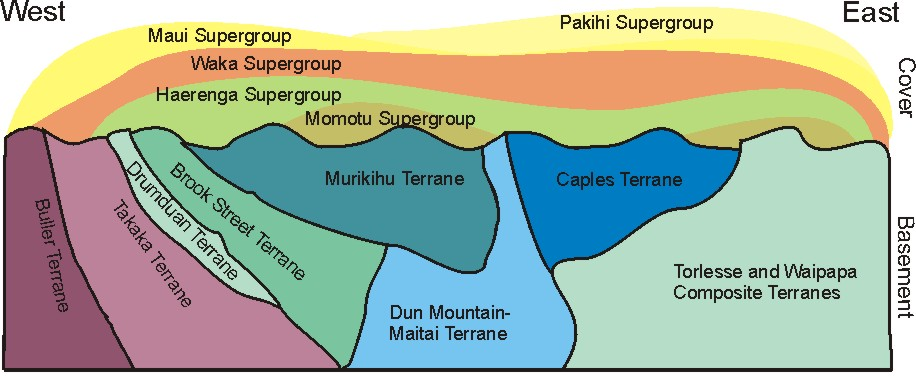
- Cross-section of New Zealand's stratigraphy

The Torlesse composite terrane is a plate tectonic terrane forming part of the South Island of New Zealand. It contains the Rakaia, Aspiring and Pahau terranes and the Esk Head Belt. Greywacke (or Torlesse Greywacke) is the dominant rock type of the composite terrane; argillite is less common and there are minor basalt occurrences. The Torlesse composite terrane is found east of the Alpine Fault in the Southern Alps of New Zealand. Its southern extent is a cryptic boundary with the Caples terrane within the Haast Schists in Central Otago. It is named for the Torlesse Range in Canterbury.

== Description ==
The Rakaia terrane rocks, of Permian to late Triassic age (300–200 Ma), occur south of Rangiora. The Pahau terrane rocks, of Late Jurassic to Early Cretaceous age (160–100 Ma), occur to the north, and are probably derived from the Rakaia terrane. At the boundary between these two terranes is the Esk Head Belt, an 11-kilometre (6.8 mi) wide mélange of broken and deformed rocks. The Aspiring terrane (Aspiring lithologic association) is officially included within the Torlesse composite terrane; however, it has a higher proportion of igneous rocks and a different sedimentary source. Its original relationship with the Rakaia terrane is obscured by the Haast Schist.

== Deposition ==
The greywacke of the Torlesse composite terrane was deposited on the eastern side of New Zealand from the Late Carboniferous through to the Middle Cretaceous. It was deposited in giant deep sea fans that extended beyond the ends of ancient submarine canyons. A fan starts with a submarine canyon on the continental shelf. Then turbidity currents rush down the canyon like giant undersea avalanches. They carry all sorts of sediments from the shallower seafloor of the continental shelf. At the end of the canyon the turbidity current spreads out and creates giant fans of sediment that blanket the deep seafloor. These sediments may have derived in part from the granitic rocks of northeastern Australia, as suggested by studies of the mineral grains.

== Metamorphism ==
The Torlesse composite terrane has undergone metamorphism and been transformed into Haast Schist. In the Haast Schists, the minerals that make up greywacke became coarser grained and altered to other minerals including quartz, feldspar and biotite. Rare pods of pounamu (jade) are found in the higher metamorphic grades near the Alpine Fault.

== Fossil content ==
- Torlessia
- Monotis
- Hector's Ichthyosaur
- Nothosaur
- Conodont

== See also ==
- Geology of the Canterbury region
- Geology of the Tasman District
- Stratigraphy of New Zealand
  - Takaka terrane
  - Dun Mountain–Maitai terrane
