= Haast Schist =

Metamorphic unit in New Zealand

- Stratigraphic range: Carboniferous-Jurassic; ~320–180 Ma
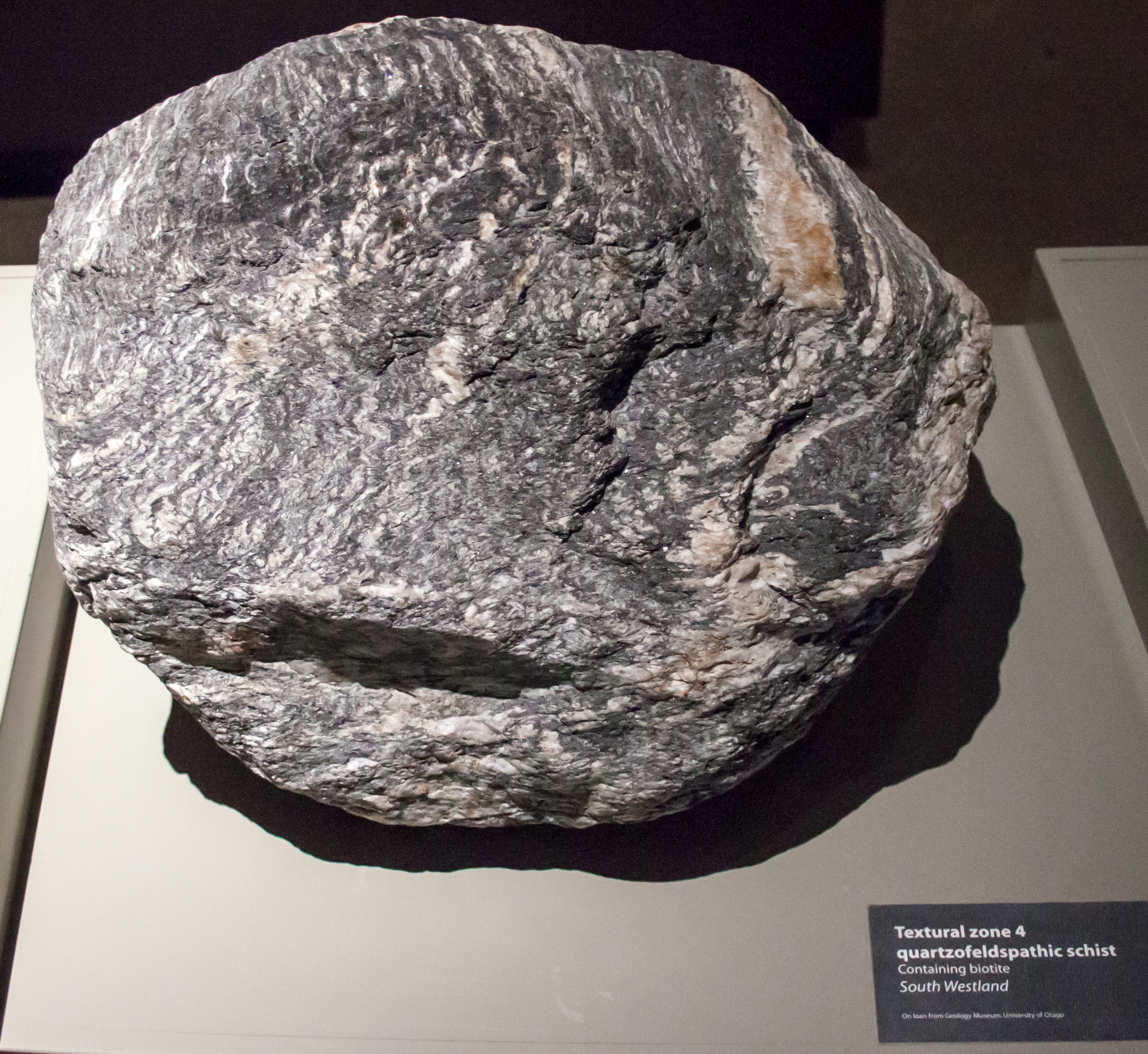
- Sample of Haast Schist, containing biotite
- Type: Metamorphic
- Unit of: Austral Superprovince
- Sub-units: Otago & Alpine Schist

Lithology
- Primary: Schist
- Other: Greenschist, jade

Location
- Region: Canterbury, Marlborough & Otago Regions; Chatham Islands
- Country: New Zealand

Type section
- Named for: Haast Pass

The Haast Schist, which contains both the Alpine and Otago Schist, is a metamorphic unit in the South Island of New Zealand. It extends from Central Otago, along the eastern side of the Alpine Fault to Cook Strait. There are also isolated outcrops of the Haast Schist within the central North Island. The schists were named after Haast Pass on the West Coast. The Haast Schist can be divided geographically from north to south into the Kaimanawa, Terawhiti, Marlborough, Alpine, Otago and Chatham schist.

== Description ==
The metamorphic grade progresses from greenschist, biotite, garnet and finally orthoclase. Myrmekitic textures occur within oligoclase within the garnet zone. The schist's protoliths were the greywacke and argillite of the Caples Terrane and Torlesse Composite Terrane. The schists were originally brought to the surface of the Earth's crust in the Cretaceous and again during the Kaikoura Orogeny along the Alpine Fault. Pounamu (Jade) is found as isolated pods in the higher metamorphic grades near the Alpine Fault.

== See also ==
- Geology of Canterbury, New Zealand
- Stratigraphy of New Zealand
