= Dun Mountain–Maitai terrane =

Geological feature in New Zealand

- Stratigraphic range: Early Permian-Triassic; ~280–200 Ma
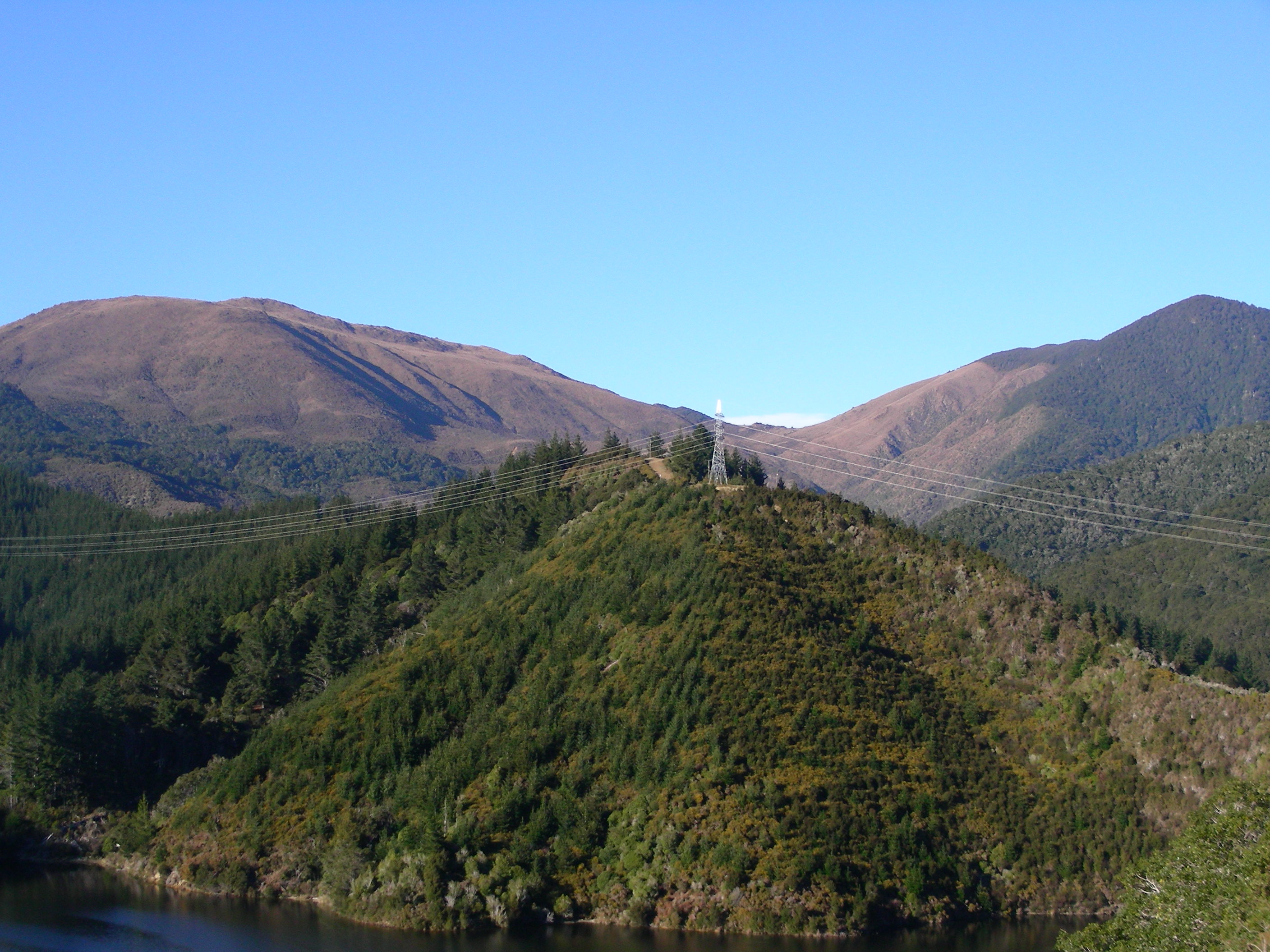
- View of Dun Mountain in Nelson for which the terrane is named
- Type: Terrane
- Unit of: Austral superprovince
- Sub-units: Dun Mountain ultramafics group, Livingstone volcanic group, Maitai group and Otanomomo complex
- Underlies: Murihiku Terrane, Momotu & Haerenga Supergroups
- Overlies: Caples Terrane

Lithology
- Primary: Basalt, gabbro, peridotite, sedimentary rocks
- Other: Jade

Location
- Region: Nelson, Tasman, Marlborough, Otago & Southland Regions
- Country: New Zealand

Type section
- Named for: Dun Mountain & Maitai River
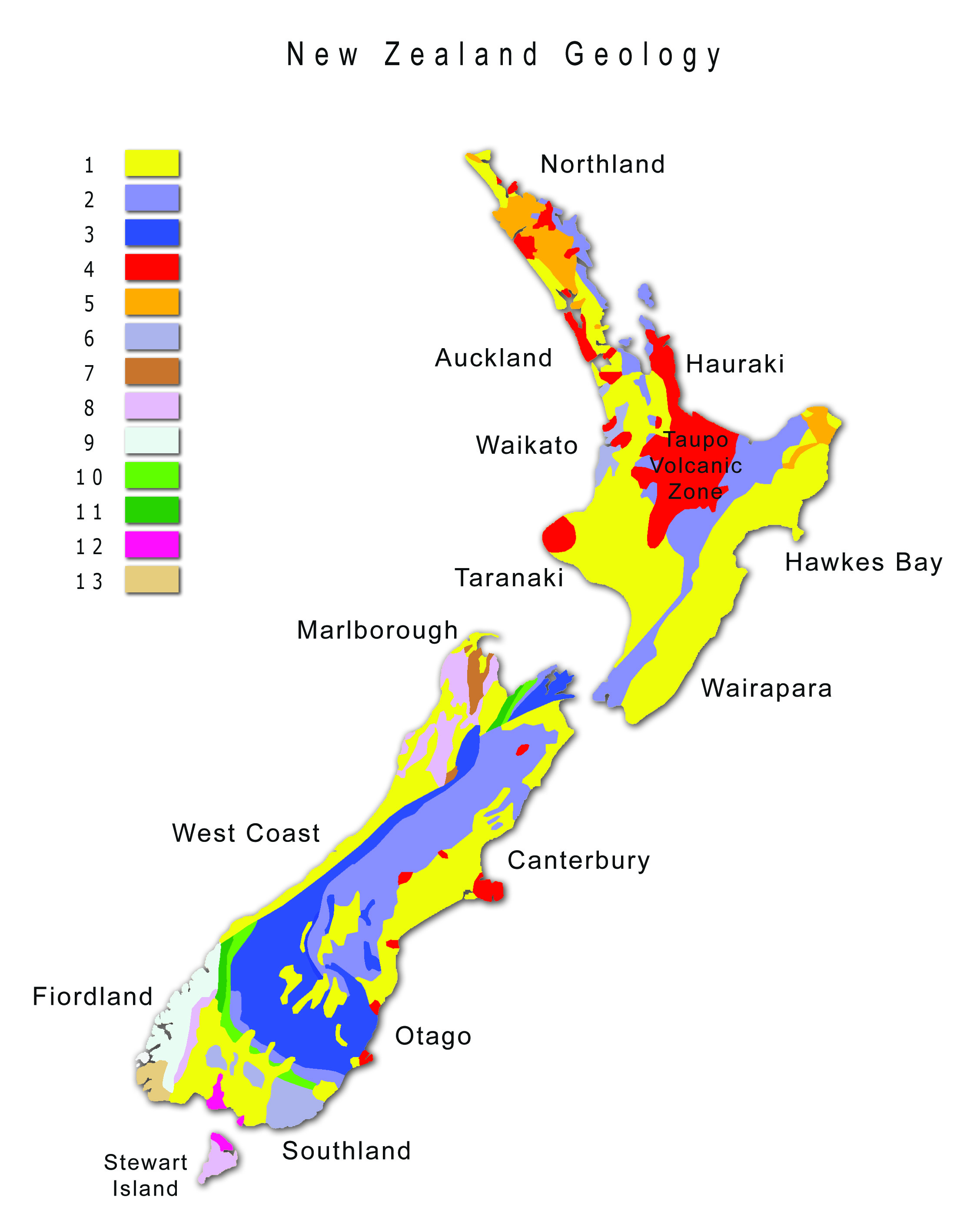
- Components of the Dun Mountain-Maitai terrane are coloured green in this map. Light green (10) are Permian ophiolites and pyroclastics and dark green (11) are Permian volcanic rocks. Adjacent are more recent greywacke light blue (2), schists dark blue (3), and the most recent sedimentary deposits are yellow (1).

The Dun Mountain–Maitai terrane comprises the Dun Mountain ophiolite belt (also called the mineral belt), Maitai group, and Patuki mélange. The Dun Mountain Ophiolite is an ophiolite of Permian age located in New Zealand's South Island. Prehistorically this ophiolite was quarried by Māori for both metasomatized argillite and pounamu (jade) which was used in the production of tools and jewellery.

In the late 1800s, the Dun Mountain ophiolite belt was surveyed for its economic potential. During this time the rock types dunite and rodingite (after Dun Mountain and the Roding River) were first named. Discovery of economic deposits of chromite near Nelson led to the building of New Zealand’s first railway; however, extraction only occurred between 1862 and 1866. In the 20th century, serpentinite was mined for fertiliser and the ophiolite remains one of New Zealand's main sources of pounamu (jade), but all other mineral exploration has failed to find economic deposits.

== Description ==
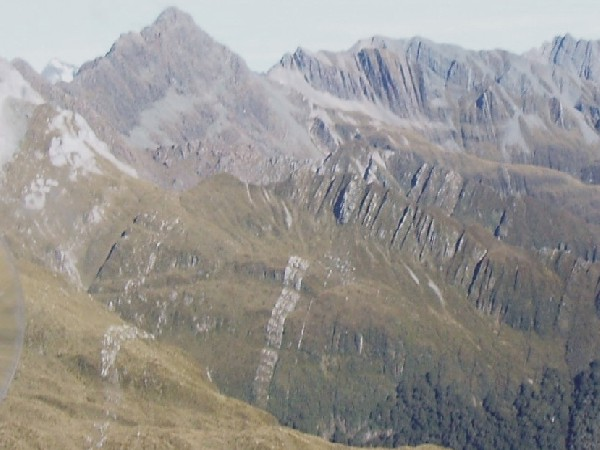
Maitai Group sediments folded into an isoclinal syncline

The Dun Mountain ophiolite belt is composed of a typical ophiolite sequence of ultramafic rocks overlain by a plutonic then volcanic sequence, and finally by conglomerates and other sedimentary rocks of the Maitai Group. The unaltered ultramafic rocks are restricted to three massifs, Dun Mountain, the Red Hills and Red Mountain; elsewhere they are highly serpentinized. This ophiolite sequence is structurally underlain by the ophiolitic Patuki Mélange. The Dun Mountain ophiolite belt likely formed in a forearc environment.

- Mantle lithologies
  - Dun Mountain ultramafics group
  - Wairere serpentinite
  - Upukerora mélange
- Crustal igneous rocks
  - Otanomomo complex
  - Livingstone volcanics group
- Crustal sedimentary rock
  - Maitai group
    - Upukerora breccia
    - Wooded Peak limestone
    - Tramway sandstone
    - Greville formation
    - Little Ben sandstone
    - Stephens subgroup
- Basal mélange
  - Windon mélange
  - Paruki mélange

== Distribution ==
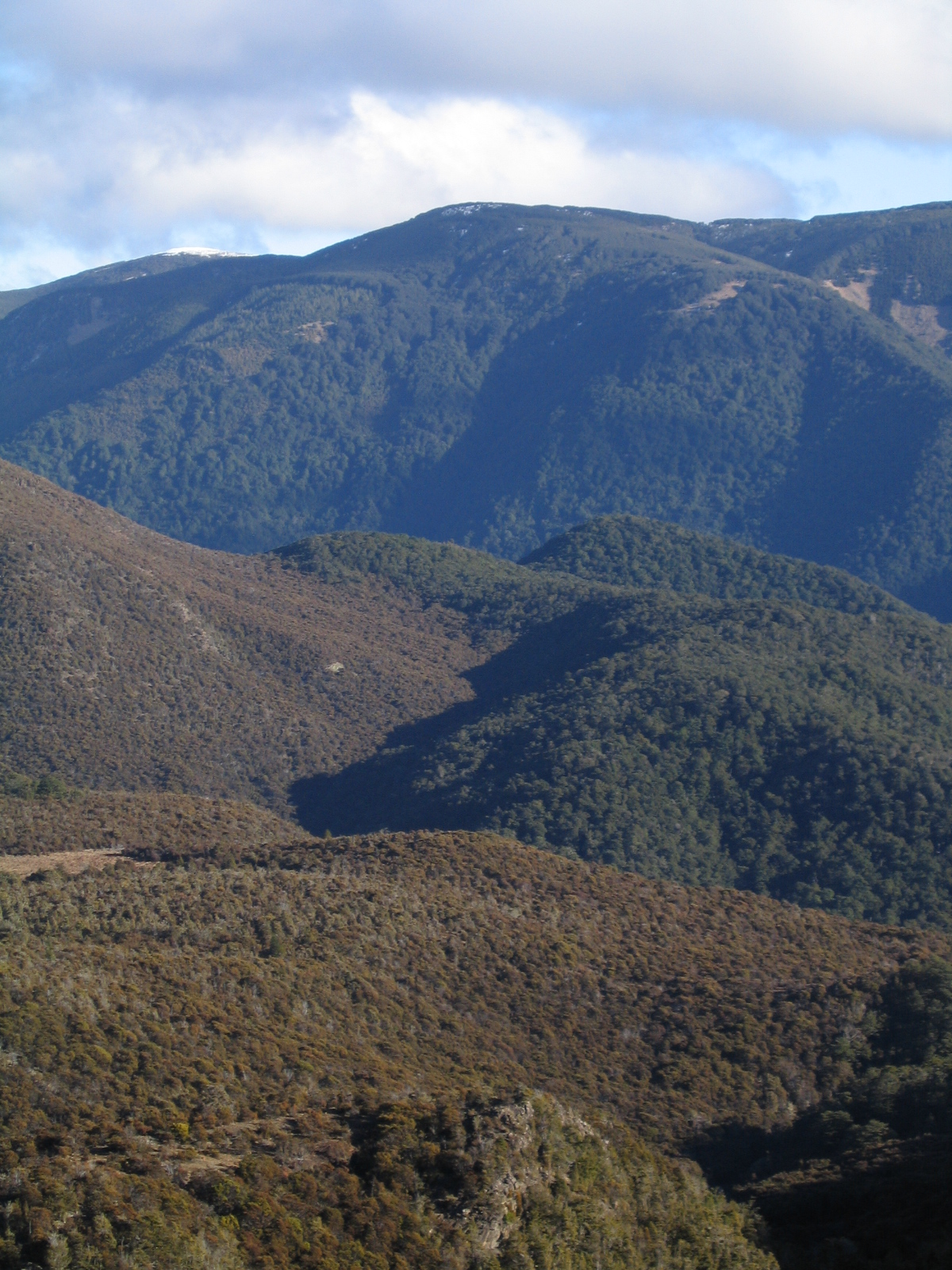
Vegetation change from the Dun Mountain ophiolite belt ultramafic rock (left) to mafic and sedimentary rock on the right.

The Dun Mountain ophiolite belt is a locally intact approximately 12 kilometres (7.5 mi) section through oceanic crust. It is exposed between D'Urville Island in Marlborough District and St Arnaud in Tasman District, and Jackson Bay in the West Coast Region and Balclutha in Otago. The Dun Mountain ophiolite belt is exposed in the South Island and is inferred to exist at depth under the North Island. It is in two sections, as it is offset by the Alpine Fault, with sections to the west of the fault having been displaced northwards. The Dun Mountain-Maitai terrane also extends at depth into the North Island as far as Northland. However it is only exposed at one place in the North Island, at the Wairere serpentinite quarry 190 km (120 mi) south of Auckland. Lithic clasts from the underlying Dun Mountain-Maitai terrane have been erupted from volcanoes in the Auckland volcanic field.

== See also ==
- Geology of the Tasman District
- Stratigraphy of New Zealand
  - Torlesse composite terrane
  - Tākaka terrane
