= Geology of the Canterbury Region =

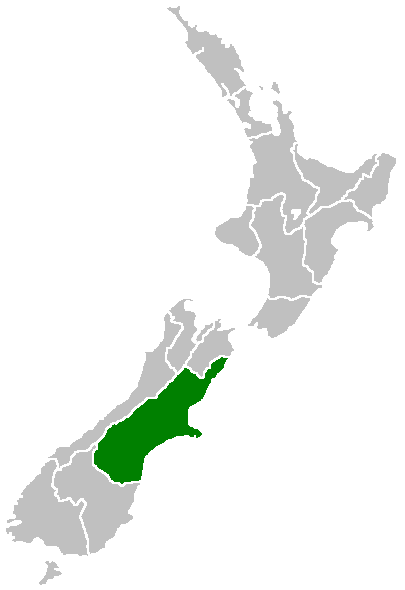
The Canterbury region

Canterbury in New Zealand is the portion of the South Island to the east of the Southern Alps / Kā Tiritiri o te Moana, from the Waiau Uwha River in the north, to the Waitaki River in the south (this is smaller than the area administered by Environment Canterbury).

To the west of the Southern Alps lies the Alpine Fault, a major fault boundary that passes through the South Island from Fiordland in the south, to the Marlborough region in the north, where it divides into multiple faults. The Pacific Plate lies to the east of the Alpine Fault and the Australian Plate lies to the west. The Pacific Plate is sliding SSW at about 35mm/yr, relative to the Australian Plate, and rising up 10mm/yr, generating the Southern Alps.

The Alpine Fault did not develop until early Miocene times (23 Ma). Ten million years ago the Southern Alps were low hills, and they only became mountainous as recently as 5 million years ago.

To the east of the Southern Alps are the Canterbury Plains, formed by the sediment eroded from the Southern Alps. On the coast, just southeast of Christchurch, is Banks Peninsula, composed of two large mainly basaltic Miocene volcanoes.

== Basement rocks ==
All basement rocks beneath the Canterbury region belong to the Torlesse Composite (Rakaia and Pahau) Terrane. They are largely composed of greywacke (hardened sandstone and mudstone) that accumulated in a deep marine environment and were accreted to the Gondwana continent before the Tasman Sea opened up in late Cretaceous times (80 Ma). They outcrop in the Southern Alps and the foothills. The Rakaia Terrane rocks, of Permian to late Triassic age (300–200 Ma), occur south of Rangiora. The Pahau Terrane rocks, of late Jurassic to early Cretaceous age (160–100 Ma), occur to the north and are probably derived from the Rakaia Terrane. At the boundary between these two terranes is the Esk Head Belt, an 11 km wide melange of broken and deformed rocks.

The basement rocks just to the east of the Alpine Fault and to the south of Timaru have been metamorphosed into schist.

== Southern Alps / Kā Tiritiri o te Moana ==
The Southern Alps began as sedimentary deposits between 230 and 170 million years ago. The predominantly greywacke formations were uplifted into mountain ranges between 140 and 120 million years ago. From about 26 million years ago, a second continuing period of uplift formed the present-day Southern Alps, driven by the collision of the Pacific tectonic plate with the Australian Plate. The plate boundary is represented by the Alpine Fault, which runs slightly west of the main divide of the Southern Alps.

== Mount Somers Volcanics ==
Volcanic activity occurred around the Mount Somers / Te Kiekie area, and nearby foothills in late Cretaceous times (100–66 Ma). Remnants still exist in the foothills from the Malvern Hills and the Rangitata River.

== Limestone ==
Sandstone, mudstone and some limestone were deposited throughout many areas from late Cretaceous to Pliocene times. Oligocene (34–24 Ma) limestone outcrops occur in South Canterbury around the Opihi River area, and in North Canterbury around Omihi, and further north near Waiau. Outcrops also occur south of Castle Hill.

== Banks Peninsula ==
The Lyttelton / Whakaraupō and Akaroa Harbours correspond to two large overlapping volcanoes, that built Banks Peninsula in late Miocene times (11–6 Ma).

== Pliocene Volcanics ==
Basalt eruptions occurred near Timaru and Geraldine, around 2.5 Ma.

== Glacial Lakes and Moraines ==
Lakes such as Lake Pukaki and Lake Tekapo in the MacKenzie Country represent the beds of previous glaciers.

== Quaternary Deposits ==
Much of the Canterbury Plains are covered by alluvial deposits from the many large rivers coming out of the Southern Alps.

== Earthquakes ==
Generally, there are few earthquakes in the Canterbury region. However, the Alpine Fault last ruptured in 1717 CE, and a major earthquake on the Alpine Fault can be expected to occur every 200 to 300 years. Liquefaction of the ground can occur up to 150 km from the epicentre for a large earthquake.

Notable earthquakes include:

- The 1888 North Canterbury earthquake
- The 2010 Canterbury earthquake, 7.1 magnitude, causing widespread damage
- The 2011 Canterbury earthquake, 6.3 magnitude, causing widespread damage and deaths

== Geological sites of interest ==
- Drive around Banks Peninsula. Look for Castle Rock, above Heathcote Valley, The Remarkable Dikes near Kaituna Pass, etc.
- Drive from Christchurch to Arthurs Pass, and over the Southern Alps, to Greymouth. Look for the change from greywacke to schist, as you near the Alpine Fault.
- Drive up to Aoraki / Mount Cook, and visit the Hooker and Haupapa / Tasman Glaciers.
- Drive from Christchurch to Hanmer Springs, for a hot swim, and see the limestone at Weka Pass on the way.

== Maps ==
Geological maps of New Zealand can be obtained from the New Zealand Institute of Geological and Nuclear Science (GNS Science), a New Zealand Government Research Institute. GNS publishes a Map of New Zealand's Geological Foundations.

The main maps are the 1 : 250 000 QMap series, which will be completed as a series of 21 maps and booklets in 2010. Low resolution versions of these maps (without the associated booklet) can be downloaded from the GNS site for free. The map for the Christchurch Area was published in 2008, and the map for the Aoraki Area was published in 2007.
