= Stratigraphy of New Zealand =

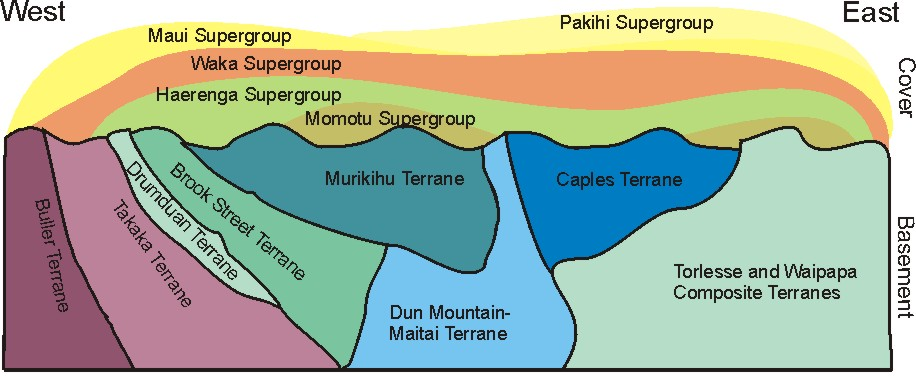
Cartoon cross-section of New Zealand stratigraphy. Cenozoic deformation has been removed for clarity.

This is a list of the units into which the rock succession of New Zealand is formally divided. As new geological relationships have been discovered new names have been proposed and others are made obsolete. Not all these changes have been universally adopted. This table is based on the 2014 New Zealand Stratigraphic Lexicon (Litho2014). However, obsolete names that are still in use and names postdating the lexicon are included if it aids in understanding.

Names for particular rock units have two parts, a proper name which is almost always a geographic location where the rock is found and a hierarchical rank (e.g. Waitematā Group). This ranking system starts with individual 'beds' of rock which can be grouped into 'members', members are grouped into 'formations', formations into 'subgroups' then 'groups'. In New Zealand, groups are further combined into 'supergroups' or for basement rocks into terranes. Not all of these hierarchical layers are necessarily present within a particular rock succession. Many New Zealand rocks can also have names based on their major rock types, such as the Wooded Peak Limestone or the Hawks Crag Breccia.

== Summary of New Zealand high order rock names ==
New Zealand stratigraphy has also informally been divided into two 'megasequences'. The Austral Superprovince (Cambrian-Cretaceous) includes all basement rocks and the Zealandia Megasequence (Cretaceous-Holocene) refers to those, younger rocks, that cover them. The Austral Superprovince is divided into the Eastern and Western Province, which have seven and two terranes respectively. The Zealandia Megasequence is divided into five supergroups, from oldest to youngest they are the Momotu, Haerenga, Waka, Māui and Pākihi supergroups.

- New Zealand rocks
  - Cover sequence (Zealandia Megasequence)
    - Pākihi Supergroup
    - Māui Supergroup
    - Waka Supergroup
    - Haerenga Supergroup
    - Momotu Supergroup
  - Basement rocks (Austral Superprovince)
    - Eastern Province
      - Waipapa composite terrane
      - Torlesse composite terrane
      - Caples terrane
      - Dun Mountain–Maitai terrane
      - Murihiku terrane
      - Brook Street terrane
      - Drumduan terrane
    - Western Province
      - Buller terrane
      - Tākaka terrane

== Basement rocks (Austral Superprovince) ==
Supergroup/Terrane	Complex/Group/Terrane	Period	Location	Summary	Notable feature
Tākaka terrane	Haupiri Group	Cambrian	Tasman	Conglomerate and siltstone	Oldest rocks in New Zealand (early Mid-Cambrian)
Tākaka terrane	Devil River Volcanics Group	Cambrian(Middle)-Cambrian(Late)	Tasman	Volcanic rock. Arc igneous rocks and sediments	
Tākaka terrane	Mount Patriarch Group	Ordovician(Early)	Tasman	Marine. Siltstone and limestone	
Tākaka terrane	Mount Arthur Group	Ordovician(Late)-Silurian	Tasman	Marble, mudstone with conodonts and sparse corals	Mount Arthur Marble in which Harwoods Hole is formed.
Tākaka terrane	Ellis Group	Devonian(Early)	Tasman	Schist and quartzite	
Tākaka terrane	Edgecumbe Group	Cambrian(Middle)-Cambrian(Late)	Fiordland	Meta-conglomerate, sandstone and basalt	
Tākaka terrane	Cameron Group	Paleozoic(Early)	Fiordland	Meta volcanic rocks and sediments	
Tākaka terrane	Pegasus Group	Paleozoic(Early)	Stewart Island	Schist	
Western Province	Tuhua Intrusives	Permian	North Island, South Island	Granite and other plutonic rocks	
Buller Terrane	Greenland Group	Cambrian-Ordovician(Early)	Westland, Tasman, Fiordland	Marine. Volcanic sandstones, siltstones,	Once thought to be Precambrian and New Zealand's oldest rocks
Buller Terrane	Golden Bay Group	Ordovician(Middle)- Ordovician(Late)	Tasman	Schist, shale and quartzite	
Buller Terrane	Reefton Group	Devonian	West Coast, Nelson	Sandstone, limestone and mudstone	
Buller Terrane	Fanny Bay Group	Ordovician	Fiordland	Pelites, semi-pelites (graphitic), quartzite	
Western Province	Parapara Group	Permian(Late)-Triassic	Tasman	Conglomerate, quartzite and slate	
Western Province	Median Tectonic Zone	Permian	North and South Islands	Multiple arc sequences	
Drumduan Terrane	Pepin Group	Jurassic	Nelson	Conglomerate	
Drumduan Terrane	Drumduan Group	Jurassic	Nelson	Marine. Mudstone, siltstone and tuff	
Drumduan Terrane	Teetotal Group	Triassic	Nelson	Conglomerate	
Drumduan Terrane	Largs Group	Cretaceous	Fiordland, Southland	Volcanic rock. Andesite, tuff and breccia	
Drumduan Terrane	Paterson Group	Jurassic(Late)	Stewart Island	Schistose volcaniclastic sediments and volcanic rhyolite and dacite	
Brook Street Terrane	Brook Street Volcanics Group	Permian	Nelson	Volcanic rocks and sediments. Mafic-intermediate volcanic island arc	
Brook Street Terrane	Greenhills Group	Permian(Middle)	Southland	Volcaniclastic breccia, dolerite, basalt with sandstone and marble	
Brook Street Terrane	Productus Creek Group	Permian-Triassic	Southland	Shallow marine and volcanogenic sediments	
Murihiku Terrane	Huriwai Group	Jurassic(Late)	Waikato, Auckland	Marine. Volcanic sandstones, siltstones, and tuff	
Murihiku Terrane	Apotu Group	Jurassic(Late)	Waikato, Auckland	Marine. Volcanic sandstones, siltstones, and tuff	
Murihiku Terrane	Kirikiri Group	Jurassic(Middle)-Jurassic(Late)	Waikato, Auckland	Marine. Volcanic sandstones, siltstones, and tuff	
Murihiku Terrane	Rengarenga Group	Triassic(Late)-Jurassic(Early)	Waikato, Auckland	Marine. Volcanic sandstones, siltstones, and tuff	
Murihiku Terrane	Newcastle Group	Triassic(Late)-Jurassic(Middle)	Waikato	Marine. Volcanic sandstones, siltstones, and tuff	
Murihiku Terrane	Richmond Group	Triassic	Nelson	Marine. Volcanic sandstones, siltstones, and tuff	
Murihiku Terrane	Diamond Peak Group	Jurassic(Early)	Southland	Marine. Volcanic sandstones, siltstones, and tuff	
Murihiku Terrane	Ferndale Group	Jurassic(Middle)	Southland	Marine. Volcanic sandstones, siltstones, and tuff	Cathedral Cave and Curio Bay petrified Forrest, Catlins
Murihiku Terrane	Mataura Group	Jurassic(Middle)	Southland	Marine. Volcanic sandstones, siltstones, and tuff	
Murihiku Terrane	North Range Group	Triassic(Early)- Triassic(Middle)	Southland	Marine. Volcanic sandstones, siltstones, and tuff	Rock type exposed in cliffs and sea stacks at Nugget Point, Catlins
Murihiku Terrane	Taringatura Group	Triassic(Middle)-Triassic(Late)	Southland	Marine. Volcanic sandstones, siltstones, and tuff	Rock type exposed in cliffs and sea stacks at Nugget Point, Catlins
Murihiku Terrane	Kuriwao Group	Permian(Middle)	Southland	Marine. Volcanic sandstones, siltstones, and tuff	
Murihiku Terrane	Park Volcanics Group	Triassic(Late)-Jurassic(Early)	Southland	Volcanic rock. Andesites	
Eastern Province	Kaka Point Structural Belt	Triassic	Southland	Marine. Volcanic sandstones, siltstones	
Dun Mountain–Maitai terrane	Dun Mountain Ultramafics Group	Permian	South Island	Plutonic rock. Ultramafic rocks and serpentinites	Source of pounamu (jade)
Dun Mountain–Maitai terrane	Livingstone Volcanic Group	Permian	South Island	Volcanic and plutonic rock. Gabbro and basalt flows	
Dun Mountain–Maitai terrane	Maitai Group	Permian-Triassic	South Island	Marine. Turbidite sequence and minor conglomerate	
Dun Mountain–Maitai terrane	Otanomomo Complex	Permian	Southland	Plutonic rock. Gabbro and diorite	
Caples Terrane	Caples Group	Permian(Late)-Triassic(Late)	North and South Islands	Greywacke and ophiolite mélange	Greenstone/Croisilles Mélange
Caples Terrane	Chrystalls Beach Complex	Triassic(Middle)	Southland	Schist mélange	
Haast Schist	Kaimanawa Schist	Jurassic	Rotorua	Schist	
Haast Schist	Terawhiti Schist	Carboniferous-Triassic	Wellington	Schist	"The most underwhelming outcrop of schist in New Zealand."
Haast Schist	Marlborough Schist	Carboniferous – Triassic	South Island	Schist	
Haast Schist	Alpine Schist	Carboniferous – Triassic	South Island	Schist	Source of pounamu (jade)
Haast Schist	Otago Schist	Carboniferous – Jurassic	Otago	Schist	
Haast Schist	Chatham Schist	Triassic	Chatham Islands	Schist	
Torlesse composite terrane	Pahau Terrane	Jurassic(Late)-Cretaceous(Early)	North and South Islands	Greywacke	
Torlesse composite terrane	Kaweka Terrane	Jurassic(Early)-Cretaceous(Early)	Rotorua, Hawkes Bay, Wanganui	Greywacke	
Torlesse composite terrane	Rakaia Terrane	Carboniferous-Jurassic	North and South Islands	Greywacke	Main rock type of the Southern Alps
Torlesse composite terrane	Esk Head Belt	Triassic(Late)-Cretaceous(Early)	Wairarapa to North Canterbury	Mélange	Boundary of the Rakaia and Pahau Terranes.
Torlesse composite terrane	Pahaoa Group	Cretaceous(Early)	Wairarapa	Greywacke	
Torlesse composite terrane	Clent Hills Group	Jurassic	North Canterbury	Greywacke	
Waipapa Composite Terrane	Waipapa Group	Triassic(Late)-Jurassic(Late)	Northland, Auckland	Greywacke and chert-basalt mélanges	
Waipapa Composite Terrane	Manaia Hill Group	Jurassic(Late)-Cretaceous(Early)	Waikato, Auckland	Greywacke	

== Cover sequence (Zealandia Megasequence) ==
Supergroup/Terrane	Complex/Group/Terrane	Period	Location	Summary	Notable feature
Momotu Supergroup	Matawai Group	Cretaceous	Gisborne	Marine. Sandstone, tuff and melange	Part of the East Coast Allochthon,
Momotu Supergroup	Ruatoria Group	Cretaceous	Gisborne	Volcanic rock	Part of the East Coast Allochthon,
Momotu Supergroup	Matakaoa Volcanics	Cretaceous- Cenozoic(Early)	Gisborne	Volcanic rock and sediments	Part of the East Coast Allochthon,
Momotu Supergroup	Mangapurupuru Group	Cretaceous	Wairarapa, Hawkes Bay	Marine. Conglomerate, sandstone and siltstone	
Momotu Supergroup	Pororari Group	Cretaceous	West Coast	Terrestrial sedimentary	Hawks Crag Breccia, uranium mineralization,
Momotu Supergroup	Hapuku Group	Cretaceous(Late)	Marlborough	Marine. Sandstone and marls	
Momotu Supergroup	Coverham Group	Cretaceous(Middle)-Cretaceous(Late)	Marlborough	Marine. Siltstone and sandstone	
Momotu Supergroup	Wallow Group	Cretaceous(Early)	Marlborough	Volcanic and sedimentary rocks	.
Momotu Supergroup	Mount Somers Volcanics Group	Cretaceous	Canterbury	Intermediate to silicic volcanic flows and domes	
Momotu Supergroup	Waihere Bay Group	Cretaceous	Chatham Islands	Sandstone and conglomerate	
Momotu Supergroup	Pitt Island Group	Cretaceous(Late)	Chatham Islands	Volcanic Rocks. Trachyte, tuff	Pitt Island
Momotu Supergroup	Puysegur Group	Cretaceous	Fiordland	Marine. Sandstone, siltstone rare conglomerate.	
Momotu Supergroup	Matakea Group	Cretaceous(Middle)-Cretaceous(Late)	Otago	Terrestrial. Breccia, conglomerate and coal	
Momotu Supergroup	Hoiho Group	Cretaceous(Late)	Great South Basin	Terrestrial. Sandstone and conglomerate, with minor coal	Possible hydrocarbon source rock in Great South Basin
Momotu Supergroup	Houhora Complex (Mt Camel Terrane)	Cretaceous(Early)	Northland	Volcanic rocks and sediments	
Momotu Supergroup	Tangihua Complex	Cretaceous(Early)	Northland Auckland	Basalt, sandstone, mudstone	Part of the Northland Allochthon
Momotu Supergroup	Tupou Complex	Cretaceous(Early)	Northland	Marine. Sandstone and mudstone	Part of the Northland Allochthon
Momotu Supergroup	Ngahape Volcanic Complex	Cretaceous(Late)-Paleocene	Wairarapa	Plutonic rock. basalt sills with minor dolerite, breccia and teschenite	
Momotu Supergroup	Mandamus Igneous Complex	Cretaceous(middle)	Canterbury	Volcanic rock. basalt	
Momotu Supergroup	Tapuaenuku Igneous Complex	Cretaceous(Middle)	Marlborough	Dike swarm and cumulates	
Haerenga Supergroup	Motatau Complex	Eocene-Oligocene	Northland	Sandstone, Limestone	Part of the Northland Allochthon.
Haerenga Supergroup	Mangakahia Complex	Cretaceous(Late)-Eocene	Northland, Auckland	Mudstone	Part of the Northland Allochthon,
Haerenga Supergroup	Te Kuiti Group	Eocene(Late)-Oligocene(Late)	Waikato, Northland, Auckland	Sandstone, Coal, Limestone	
Haerenga Supergroup	Moa Group	Paleocene-Eocene	Taranaki	Marine.	
Haerenga Supergroup	Kapuni Group	Paleocene-Eocene	Taranaki, Tasman	Terrestrial. Alluvium	Rocks forming the cliff and sea stacks around Cape Farewell and Wharariki Beach,
Haerenga Supergroup	Tinui Group	Cretaceous(Late)-Paleocene	Wairarapa, Gisborne	Marine. Mudstone and sandstone	Dinosaur fossils (Tahora Formation),
Haerenga Supergroup	Mangatu Group	Paleocene-Oligocene	Gisborne	Marine. Mudstone and sandstone	
Haerenga Supergroup	Tora Group	Cretaceous(Late)-Eocene	Wairarapa	Marine. Mudstone, sandstone and greensand	
Haerenga Supergroup	Jenkins Group	Eocene-Miocene	Nelson	Coal	
Haerenga Supergroup	Rapahoe Group	Eocene-Oligocene	Westland	Marine and marginal marine sediments	
Haerenga Supergroup	Pakawau Group	Cretaceous(Late)	Nelson, Taranaki	Coal Measures	
Haerenga Supergroup	Paparoa Coal Measures	Cretaceous(Late)-Paleocene	Westland	Coal Measures	
Haerenga Supergroup	Eyre Group	Cretaceous(Late)-Oligocene(Early)	Marlborough	Volcanic and sedimentary rock. Basalt and greensand	Plesiosaur fossils in the Conway Formation,
Haerenga Supergroup	Muzzle Group	Cretaceous(Late)-Paleocene	Marlborough	Marine. Mudstone, greensand, limestone and volcanic rock	
Haerenga Supergroup	Seymour Group	Cretaceous(Late)	Marlborough	Marine. Sandstone and limestone	
Haerenga Supergroup	Tioriori Group	Paleocene(Late)-Eocene(Early)	Chatham Islands	Marine. Limestone and greensand	
Haerenga Supergroup	Kekerione Group	Paleocene(Late)-Eocene(Late)	Chatham Islands	Marine and volcanic rock. Limestone, tuff and volcanic rock	
Haerenga Supergroup	Annick Group	Eocene	Southland	Terrestrial. Sandstone and siltstone	
Haerenga Supergroup	Onekakara Group	Cretaceous(Late)-Oligocene	Otago, Canterbury	Marine. Siltstone	Host for the Moeraki Boulder concretions
Haerenga Supergroup	Matakea Group	Cretaceous(Middle)- Cretaceous(Late)	Otago	Terrestrial and marine. Sandstone and coal	
Haerenga Supergroup	Ohai Group	Cretaceous(Late)	Southland	Terrestrial. Breccia, sandstone and coal	
Haerenga Supergroup	Nightcaps Group	Eocene-Oligocene	Southland	Terrestrial. Coal and sandstone	Nightcaps coal mines
Haerenga Supergroup	Balleny Group	Eocene-Oligocene	Fiordland	Terrestrial and marine	
Haerenga Supergroup	Pakaha Group	Cretaceous(Late)-Paleocene	Great South Basin	Marine. Mudstone	Possible hydrocarbon source rock in Great South Basin
Haerenga Supergroup	Rakiura Group	Paleocene-Eocene	Great South Basin	Marine. Mudstone	
Haerenga Supergroup	Campbell Island Group	Cretaceous(Late)-Oligocene(Middle)	Campbell Island	Marine. Limestone	Campbell Island,
Haerenga Supergroup	Non-Grouped formation	Eocene	Nelson, West Coast	Terrestrial sedimentary	Brunner Coal Measures and the Brunner Mine,
Waka Supergroup	Motatau Complex	Eocene-Oligocene	Auckland	Marine, Limestones and calcareous mudstones	Part of the Northland Allochthon.
Waka Supergroup	Tangihua Complex	Cretaceous(Early)	Auckland and Northland	Volcanic rock.Basalt	Part of the Northland Allochthon.
Waka Supergroup	Te Kuiti Group	Eocene(Late)-Oligocene(Late)	Waikato, Northland, Auckland	Marine, minor terrestrial. Clastic and biogenic sediments	Host rock of the Waitomo Caves and the Piercy Island hole in the rock.
Waka Supergroup	Ngatoro Group	Oligocene	Taranaki	Marine. Sandstone, limestone and greensand	
Waka Supergroup	Mangatu Group	Paleocene-Oligocene	Gisborne	Marine. Mudstone and sandstone	
Waka Supergroup	Nile Group	Oligocene-Miocene(Early)	Westland	Marine. Limestones	Punakaiki Rocks and Oparara Basin Arches.
Waka Supergroup	Motunau Group	Oligocene-Pleistocene(Late)	North Canterbury	Marine. Quartzose sandstone and minor siltstone	
Waka Supergroup	Cookson Volcanics Group	Oligocene(Early)	North Canterbury	Volcanic Rock.	
Waka Supergroup	Kekenodon Group	Oligocene-Miocene(Early)	South Canterbury	Glauconitic sandstone and sandy limestone	Kokoamu Greensand and the Castle Hill climbing area
Waka Supergroup	Alma Group	Eocene(late)- Oligocene(early)	Otago, South Canterbury	Marine. Limestone, marl and volcanic rocks	Oamaru Stone (limestone) and volcanic rocks in the cliffs around Oamaru.
Waka Supergroup	Balleny Group	Eocene-Oligocene	Fiordland	Breccia	
Waka Supergroup	Waiau Group	Oligocene-Miocene	Southland	Marine and terrestrial. Conglomerate, breccia, limestone and sandstone	
Māui Supergroup	Reinga Group	Cretaceous-Paleocene	Northland	Terrestrial, minor marine. Conglomerates and fluvial deposits	
Māui Supergroup	Parengarenga Group	Oligocene-Miocene(Early)	Northland	Marine. Sandstone and mudstone	
Māui Supergroup	Coromandel Group	Miocene(Early)-Pliocene	Coromandel	Volcanic rock	Hard rock gold mines on the Coromandel Peninsula
Māui Supergroup	Waitakere Group	Early Miocene	Auckland	Volcanic rock. Basaltic-andesite and conglomerate	Lion Rock, Piha
Māui Supergroup	Otaua Group	Oligocene(Late)-Miocene	Northland	Marine. Mudstone with minor sandstone	
Māui Supergroup	Ti Point Group	Miocene(Late)-Holocene	Northland	Volcanic rock	
Māui Supergroup	Whitianga Group	Miocene(Late)-Pleistocene(Early)	Coromandel, Auckland, Northland	Volcanic rock. Rhyolite lava dome and ignimbrite, minor sediments	
Māui Supergroup	Waitemata Group	Miocene	Auckland	Marine. Turbidites	Sea cliffs around Waitematā Harbour.
Māui Supergroup	Kiwitahi Volcanic Group	Miocene	Auckland, Waikato, Rotorua	Volcanic rock. Andesite	
Māui Supergroup	Whakamarama Group	Pleistocene(Middle)	Bay of Plenty	Volcanic rock. Andesite and ignimbrite	
Māui Supergroup	Wai-iti Group	Miocene(Middle-late)	Taranaki	Marine. Sandstone and mudstone	
Māui Supergroup	Whangamomona Group	Miocene(Middle)-Pliocene(Early)	Taranaki, Waikato, Wanganui	Marine. Sandstone and siltstone	
Māui Supergroup	Mokau Group	Miocene(Early)	Taranaki, Waikato, Wanganui	Terrestrial. Sandstone and coal	
Māui Supergroup	Mahoenui Group	Miocene(Early)	Taranaki	Marine. Turbidites	
Māui Supergroup	Tolaga Group	Miocene	Gisborne	Marine. Sandstone, limestone and mudstone	
Māui Supergroup	Awatere Group	Miocene(Late)-Pliocene(Late)	Marlborough	Marine. Conglomerate and sandstone	
Māui Supergroup	Blue Bottom Group	Miocene-Pliocene	Westland, Nelson	Marine. Calcareous sandstone and siltstone	
Māui Supergroup	Rappahannock Group	Miocene(Late)- Pleistocene(Early)	Nelson	Terrestrial. Sandstone and conglomerate	
Māui Supergroup	Motunau Group	Oligocene(Late)- Pleistocene	North Canterbury	Marine. Glauconitic, calcareous sandstone, with minor siltstone	
Māui Supergroup	Burnt Hill Group	Oligocene-Pliocene(Early)	North Canterbury	Marine, minor terrestrial. Basalt breccia and sandstone	
Māui Supergroup	Diamond Harbour Volcanic Group	Miocene(Late)-Pliocene)Early)	North Canterbury	Volcanic rock.Basalt	Banks Peninsula Volcano, Christchurch.
Māui Supergroup	Mount Herbert Volcanic Group	Miocene(Late)	North Canterbury	Volcanic rock.Basalt	Banks Peninsula Volcano, Christchurch.
Māui Supergroup	Akaroa Volcanic Group	Miocene(Late)	North Canterbury	Volcanic rock. Basaltic to trachytic lava flows	Banks Peninsula Volcano, Christchurch.
Māui Supergroup	Lyttelton Volcanic Group	Miocene(Late)	North Canterbury	Volcanic rock.Basalt	Banks Peninsula Volcano, Christchurch.
Māui Supergroup	Dunedin Volcanic Group	Miocene	Eastern Otago	Volcanic rock. Multi phase shield volcano	Otago Peninsula and the north side of Otago Harbour.
Māui Supergroup	East Southland Group	Oligocene(Late)-Miocene(Middle)	Southland	Terrestrial.	
Māui Supergroup	Otakou Group	Oligocene- Miocene	South Canterbury, Otago	Marine. Sandstone, mudstone and limestone	Cliff of Caversham Sandstone at Tunnel Beach, Dunedin.
Māui Supergroup	Manuherikia Group	Miocene-Pliocene	Otago, Southland	Terrestrial. Fluvial sediments	New Zealand's only fossilized land mammal (St Bathans fauna)).
Māui Supergroup	Hawkdun Group	Miocene(Late)-Pliocene	Otago	Terrestrial. Fluvial sediments	
Māui Supergroup	Waiau Group	Oligocene-Miocene	Southland	Marine, Limestone, sandstone and mass flow conglomerates.	
Māui Supergroup	Penrod Group	Eocene(Late)-Miocene	Great South Basin, Campbell Island	Marine.	
Pākihi Supergroup	Ngaio Group	Pleistocene(Late)	Kermadec Islands	Volcanic rock. Breccia, pumice, tephra	Raoul Island
Pākihi Supergroup	Macauley Group	Pleistocene	Kermadec Islands	Volcanic rock. Lava, pumice	Macauley Island
Pākihi Supergroup	Haszard Group	Pleistocene	Kermadec Islands	Volcanic rock. tuff, scoria	Macauley Island
Pākihi Supergroup	Herald Group	Pleistocene	Kermadec Islands	Volcanic rock. Volcanics and intercalated sedimentary deposits	Raoul Island
Pākihi Supergroup	Karioitahi Group	Pleistocene(Early)-Holocene	Northland, Auckland	Terrestrial. Sand dunes	West coast ironsands, Auckland
Pākihi Supergroup	Awhitu Group	Pliocene(Late)-Pleistocene(Early)	Northland, Auckland	Terrestrial, sand dunes, alluvium	Old sand dunes from Ninety Mile Beach
Pākihi Supergroup	Tauranga Group	Pliocene-Pleistocene	Bay of Plenty, Waikato	Terrestrial, alluvium, sandstone, pumice	
Pākihi Supergroup	Hauturu Volcanic Group	Pliocene(Late)-Pleistocene(Early)	Auckland, Northland	Volcanic rock, Rhyodacite	Little Barrier Island, Hauraki Gulf
Pākihi Supergroup	Mayor Island Group	Pleistocene(Late)-Holocene	Bay of Plenty	Volcanic rock, Rhyolite	Forms Mayor Island, Bay of Plenty
Pākihi Supergroup	Kerikeri Volcanic Group	Pliocene(Late)-Holocene	Auckland, Northland, Waikato	Volcanic rock, Basaltic flows and scoria cones	Auckland volcanic field and Wairere Boulders
Pākihi Supergroup	Alexandra Volcanic Group	Pliocene-Pleistocene	Waikato	Volcanic rock	
Pākihi Supergroup	Orangiwhao Intrusive Group	Pliocene(middle)	Waikato	Volcanic rock, Andesite	
Pākihi Supergroup	Whakamaru Group	Pleistocene	Rotorua, Waikato	Volcanic rock, Ignimbrite	
Pākihi Supergroup	Pakaumanu Group	Pliocene-Pleistocene	Rotorua	Volcanic rock, Ignimbrite	
Pākihi Supergroup	Ongaroto Group	Pleistocene	Rotorua	Volcanic rock, Rhyolite lava dome	
Pākihi Supergroup	Maroa Group	Pleistocene	Rotorua	Volcanic rock, Ignimbrites and pyroclastic rocks	
Pākihi Supergroup	Taupō Group	Holocene	Rotorua	Volcanic rock, Tephra and ignimbrite	Taupō Volcano
Pākihi Supergroup	Okataina Group	Pleistocene(Late)-Holocene	Rotorua	Volcanic rock. Tephra, flows and lava domes	Part of the Taupō Volcanic Zone
Pākihi Supergroup	Ruapehu Group	Pleistocene	Wanganui	Volcanic rock, Andesite and tephra	Mount Ruapehu
Pākihi Supergroup	Rotokare Group	Pliocene	Taranaki	Marine, Sandstone and mudstone	
Pākihi Supergroup	Whangamomona Group	Miocene(Middle)-Pliocene(Early)	Taranaki, Waikato, Wanganui	Marine, Sandstone and mudstone	
Pākihi Supergroup	Kidnappers Group	Pleistocene(Late)	Hawkes Bay	Marine, Turbidites and tuff	Cape Kidnappers
Pākihi Supergroup	Onoke Group	Miocene(Late)- Pleistocene	Wellington, Wairarapa	Marine, Mudstone, greensand and limestones	Badlands erosion forming the Pūtangirua Pinnacles
Pākihi Supergroup	Mangaheia Group	Miocene(Late)-Pliocene	Gisborne, Hawkes Bay	Marine, Sandstone, mudstone, and limestones	
Pākihi Supergroup	Old Man Group	Pliocene(Late)- Pleistocene(Early)	Nelson	Terrestrial, minor marine, Gravel and minor sands and muds	Caused by the start of uplift on the Alpine Fault and resultant erosion
Pākihi Supergroup	Tadmor Group	Miocene-Pliocene	Nelson	Terrestrial, Gravel and minor sands, peat and muds	
Pākihi Supergroup	Motunau group	Oligocene(Late)-Pleistocene	North Canterbury	Marine, Sandstone, greensand and limestones	
Pākihi Supergroup	Karewa Group	Pliocene-Pleistocene	Chatham Islands	Terrestrial, minor marine, Sand, peat and ash	
Pākihi Supergroup	Hawkdun Group	Miocene(Late)-Pliocene	Otago	Terrestrial, Gravel, minor sand, mud and breccia	One source of alluvial gold in Otago
Pākihi Supergroup	Solander Island Volcanics	Pliocene	Fiordland	Volcanic rock, Andesites	Solander Island

== See also ==
- Geology of New Zealand
- New Zealand geologic time scale
- List of rock formations of New Zealand
