= Dun Mountain =

Mountain near Nelson, New Zealand

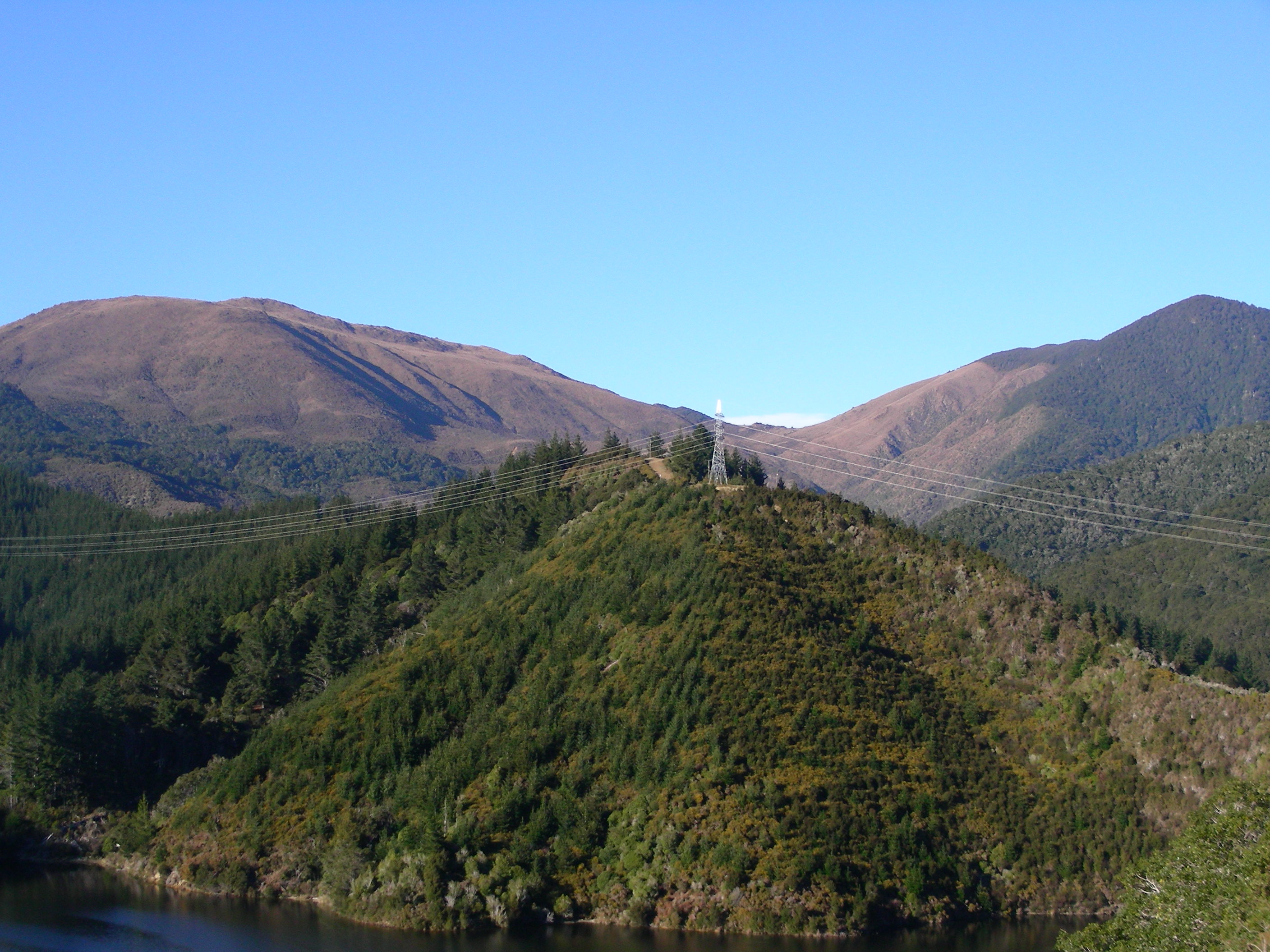

Highest point
- Elevation: 1,129 m (3,704 ft)

Geography
- Location: Nelson, New Zealand

Dun Mountain is a mountain in the Richmond Range near the city of Nelson in the Tasman District of New Zealand's South Island. It is located between the catchments of the Pelorus, Maitai and Roding Rivers. The mountain is named for its brown (Dun) colour. The colour is caused by the ultramafic rock which forms the mountain. Ultramafic Rock weathers to this colour and plant growth is also stunted due to the soils high heavy metal content. The ultramafic rock formed in the Earth's mantle in the Permian and is now part of the Dun Mountain Ophiolite Belt.

In 1859 the rock type dunite was first identified on the mountain and named after it. Between 1850 and 1865 small deposits of chromite and copper were mined on the mountain leading to the building of New Zealand's first railway.
