= Boulder =

Natural rock fragment larger than 10 inches

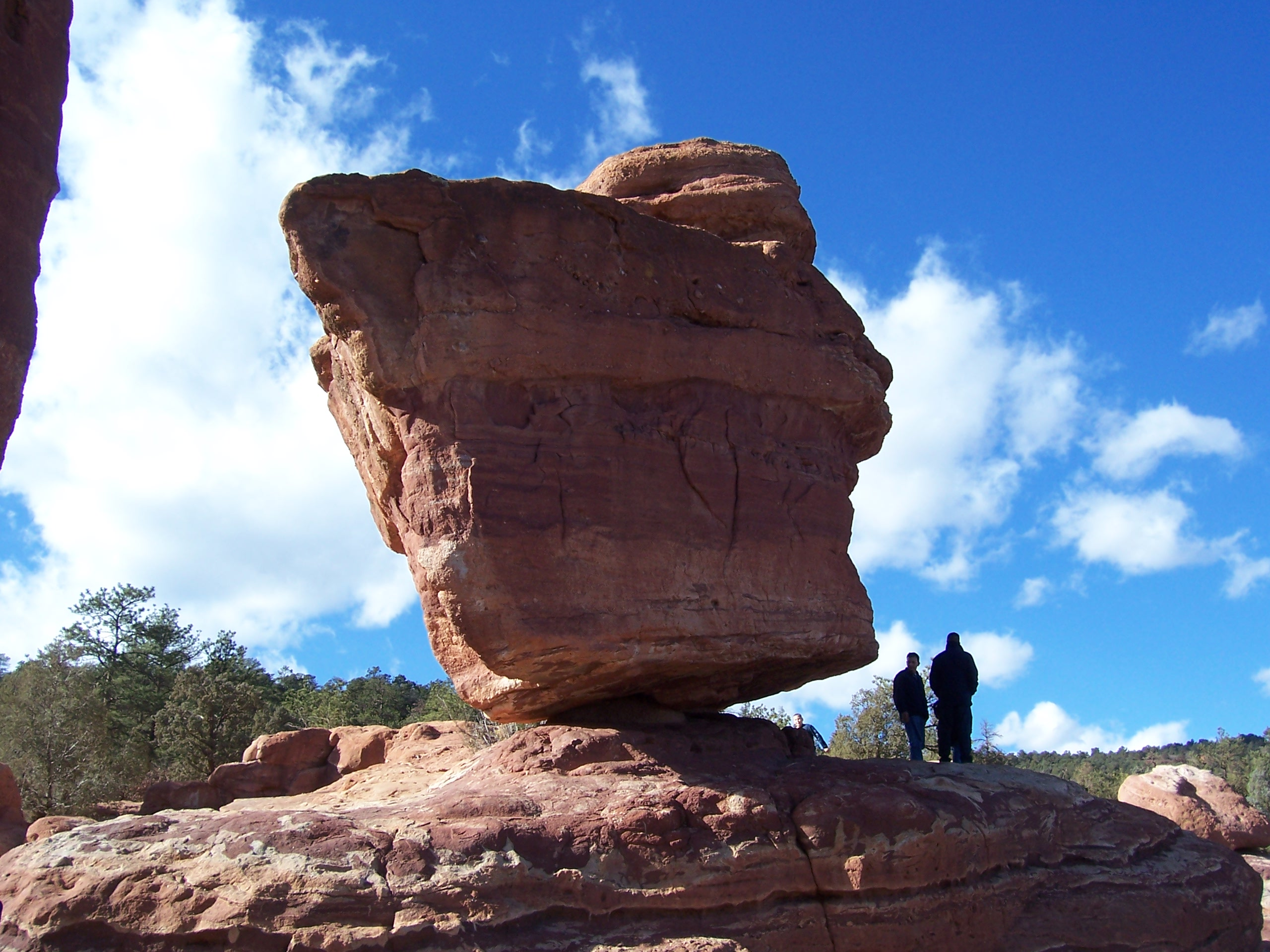
This balancing boulder, "Balanced Rock", stands in Garden of the Gods park in Colorado Springs, Colorado, United States.

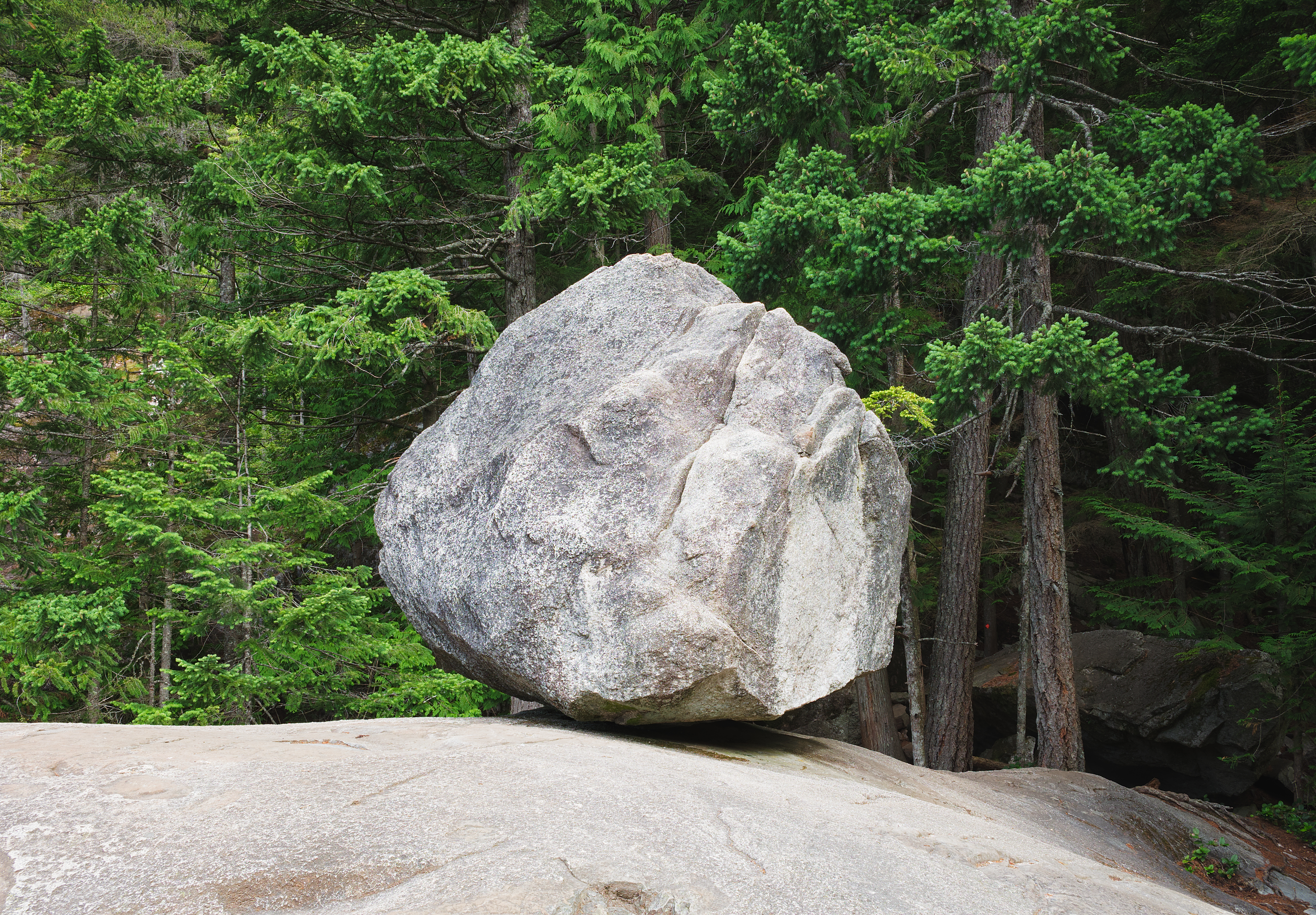
Boulder in British Columbia, Canada

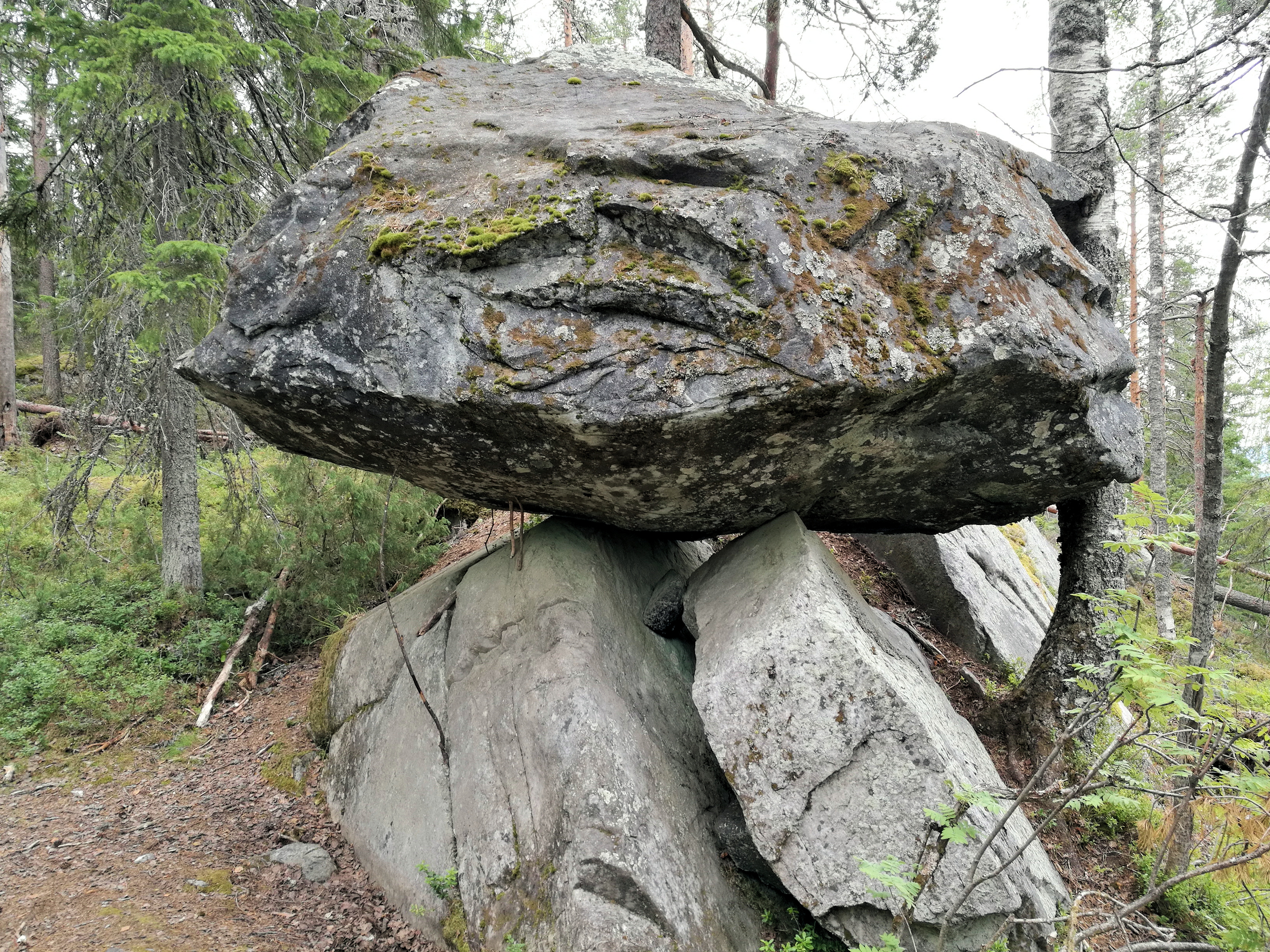
Kämmenkivi stone on the Pisa hill in Kuopio, Finland

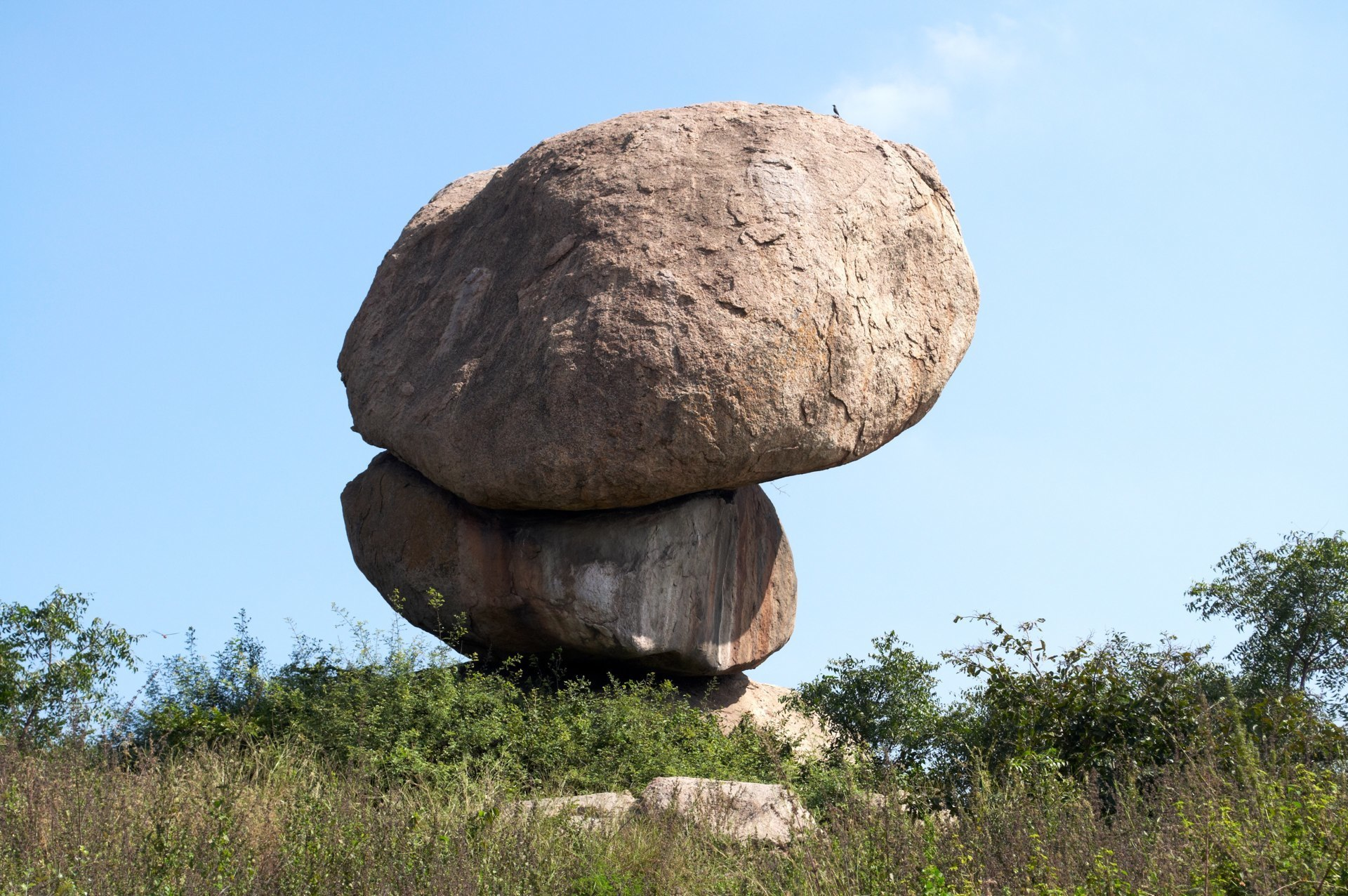
Balanced granite boulders at Hyderabad, India

In geology, a boulder is a rock fragment with size greater than 25.6 cm (10.1 in) in diameter. Smaller pieces are called cobbles and pebbles. While a boulder may be small enough to move or roll manually, others are extremely massive. In common usage, a boulder is too large for a person to move. Smaller boulders are usually just called rocks or stones.

== Etymology ==
The word boulder derives from boulder stone, from Middle English bulderston or Swedish bullersten. It was formerly also spelled bowlder.

== About ==
In places covered by ice sheets during ice ages, such as Scandinavia, northern North America, and Siberia, glacial erratics are common. Erratics are boulders picked up by ice sheets during their advance, and deposited when they melt. These boulders are called "erratic" because they typically are of a different rock type than the bedrock on which they are deposited. One such boulder is used as the pedestal of the Bronze Horseman in Saint Petersburg, Russia.

Some noted rock formations involve giant boulders exposed by erosion, such as the Devil's Marbles in Australia's Northern Territory, the Horeke basalts in New Zealand, where an entire valley contains only boulders, and The Baths on the island of Virgin Gorda in the British Virgin Islands.

Boulder-sized clasts are found in some sedimentary rocks, such as coarse conglomerate and boulder clay.

== See also ==
- Bouldering, free climbing performed on small rock formations or artificial climbing walls
- Moeraki Boulders, unusually large spherical boulders found in New Zealand
- Monolith, a geological feature consisting of a single massive rock
- List of individual rocks
- Floaters
