= List of rock formations of New Zealand =

This is a list of rock formations in New Zealand based on their aesthetic and cultural importance. New Zealand's geomorphology is formed through an interaction between uplift, erosion and the underlying rock type. Most of the notable examples listed here are formed by selective erosion, for example waves and rivers can more easily erode sandstone than basalt and can also exploit joints or faults in the rock-mass. Some rocks like limestone (Waitomo Caves) and marble (Takaka Hill) can also be dissolved in water which forms a distinctive karst geomorphology. Notable rock formations are also formed through constructive processes such as geothermal and volcanic deposits, and sedimentary deposition.

== North Island formations ==
Photo	Formation	Region	Type	Summary	Location
	Cape Kidnappers	Hawke's Bay	Wave erosion, sea stack		39.647473°S 177.086699°E
	Castle Craig Rock	Waikato	Terrestrial erosion		38°15′35″S 174°49′15″E
	Castlepoint	Wellington, Wairarapa	Wave erosion		40°53′55″S 176°13′14″E
	Cathedral Cove	Waikato, Coromandel Peninsula	Wave erosion, cave, sea stack		36°49′42″S 175°47′24″E
	The Dome of Saint Paul	Northland, Whangaroa	Terrestrial erosion, igneous rock		35.050731°S 173.749623°E
	Hole in the Rock	Northland, Piercy Island	Wave erosion, Natural arch	Limestone island with a natural arch. Significant tourist attraction.	35.165437°S 174.339061°E
	Horeke basalts, Wairere Boulders	Northland	Terrestrial erosion, igneous rock	Lava flow broken up as lower strata removed by erosion. Notable corrugation on basalt boulders.	35.374687°S 173.596301°E
	Kupe's Sail	Wellington, Wairarapa, Palliser Bay		A dipping bed of slightly more resistant rock protruding above weaker rock.	41.60448°N 175.26616°E
	Koutu Boulders	Northland	Wave erosion		35.458139°S 173.414767°E
	Lion Rock	Auckland, Piha	Wave erosion, sea stack	Prominent islet with shear cliffs of volcanic conglomerate	36.953685°S 174.465880°E
	Mangapohue Natural Bridge	Waikato	Terrestrial erosion, karst		38.261043°S 174.899301°E
	Natural Vase		Wave erosion		
	Orakei Korako (including Golden Fleece Terrace and Rainbow Terrace)	Bay of Plenty	Geothermal	Geothermal terraces formed by minerals precipitating as the water cools.	38°28′25″S 176°08′55″E
	Pink and White Terraces	Bay of Plenty, Mount Tarawera	Geothermal	Significant geothermal terraces formed by minerals precipitating as the water cools. These terraces were thought destroyed by the 1886 eruption of Mount Tarawera, however they may have just been buried.	38°15′40″S 176°25′50″E
	The Pinnacles	Waikato, Coromandel Peninsula	Terrestrial erosion, volcanic rock	Andesite lava spires preserved when the weaker neighbouring pyroclastic rocks were eroded.	37.043223°S 175.726249°E
	Pinnacle Ridge and Cathedral Rocks	Whanganui-Manawatū, Mount Ruapehu	Terrestrial erosion, volcanic rock	Rock spires of andesite near summit of Mount Ruapehu.	39°14′30″S 175°34′00″E
	Poor Knights Islands	Northland	Wave erosion, natural arch		35°30′S 174°45′E
	Putangirua Pinnacles	Wellington, Wairarapa	Terrestrial erosion, sedimentary rock		41°27′05″S 175°13′20″E
	Te Kaukau Point	Wellington, Wairarapa	Wave erosion		41°34′20″S 175°25′50″E
	Three Sisters and Elephant Rock	Taranaki	Wave erosion, sea stacks, and natural arch	Notable for their well documented partial destruction from wave erosion.	38°49′07″S 174°34′52″E
	Waimangu Volcanic Rift Valley (including Cathedral Rocks and Warbrick Terrace)	Bay of Plenty	Geothermal		38°17′10″S 176°23′15″E
	Waro Limestone Scenic Reserve	Northland, Hikurangi	Terrestrial erosion, sedimentary rock		35°35′15″S 174°17′10″E
	Young Nick's Head	Gisborne	Wave erosion		38°45′25″S 177°57′50″E

== South Island formations ==
Photo	Formation	Region	Type	Summary	Location
	Blackhead	Otago, Dunedin	Wave erosion, volcanic rock and sea stacks	Rock spires with basaltic columnar jointing	45°55′50″S 170°26′00″E
	Boulder Bank	Nelson	Wave erosion and deposition		41°14′S 173°18′E
	Castle Hill	Canterbury	Terrestrial erosion, sedimentary rock		43°13′45″S 171°43′00″E
	Cathedral Caves	Otago, The Catlins	Wave erosion, cave		46°36′30″S 169°22′50″E
	Cook's Head Rock	Otago	Wave erosion		46°12′05″S 170°04′50″E
	Curio Bay	Southland, The Catlins	Wave erosion	Petrified forest	46°39′45″S 169°05′55″E
	Elephant Rocks	Otago, Waitaki Valley	Terrestrial erosion, sedimentary rock		44°53′35″S 170°39′20″E
	Farewell Spit	Tasman	Wave erosion and deposition		40°31′S 172°52′E
	Huriawa Peninsula	Otago, Karitane	Wave erosion, natural arch and sea stacks		45°38′30″S 170°40′00″E
	Kaitorete Spit	Canterbury	Wave erosion and deposition		43°50′S 172°33′E
	Knights Point	West Coast	Wave erosion, sea stacks	Cliff and sea stacks formed by combination of uplift on the Alpine Fault and high erosion.	43°42′45″S 169°13′30″E
	Lion's Head Rock	Otago, Sandfly Bay	Wave erosion, sea stacks		45°54′18″S 170°39′04″E
	Lovers Leap and The Chasm	Otago, Sandymount	Wave erosion, natural arch		45°53′35″S 170°40′44″E
	Moeraki Boulders	Otago	Wave erosion	Strong calcite concretions eroded out of a weak marine mudstone. Boulders also present in the cliff face and nearby streams.	45°20′55″S 170°49′40″E
	Nevis Bluff	Otago, Kawarau Valley	Seismic uplift, river erosion	Steep mica schist cliff face.	45°02′15″S 168°59′50″E
	Nugget Point	Otago, The Catlins	Wave erosion, sea stacks	Several sea stacks at the end of a prominent headland. The near vertical sandstone bedding creating steep planar cliffs.	46°26′50″S 169°48′55″E
	The Obelisk (The Old Man; Kopuwai)	Otago, Old Man Range / Kopuwai	Freeze thaw weathering		45°20′31″S 169°12′36″E
	The Old Man of the Buller	West Coast, Buller River			41°57′00″S 172°17′50″E
	Omarama Clay Cliffs	Otago, Ahuriri Valley	Glacial erosion		44°29′20″S 169°52′00″E
	Ōnawe Peninsula	Canterbury, Banks Peninsula	Wave erosion		43°46′30″S 172°55′30″E
	Oparara Basin Arches	West Coast	Terrestrial erosion, natural arch	Ground water erosion along the boundary of the basement granite and overlying limestone has formed caves and archers.	41°08′45″S 172°11′15″E
	The Organ Pipes	Otago, Dunedin	Terrestrial erosion, volcanic rock	Rock spire with basaltic columnar jointing	45°48′30″S 170°34′00″E
	Pancake Rocks	West Coast, Punakaiki	Wave erosion, natural arch	A coastal karst geomorphology. The apparent bedding within the limestone may be due to pressure solution of calcite during burial.	42°06′50″S 171°19′35″E
	The Pyramids	Otago, Dunedin	Wave erosion, seas stack		45°49′25″S 170°43′15″E
	Rapanui (Shag Rock)	Canterbury, Christchurch	Wave erosion, Sea Stack	Sea stack partially destroyed in the February 2011 Christchurch earthquake.	43°33′50″S 172°45′00″E
	Split Apple Rock	Tasman	Wave erosion, igneous rock	A spheroidal granite block divided on a joint.	41°01′05″S 173°01′15″E
	Te Anau glacial erratic	Southland, Te Anau	Glacial deposition	A Geological Reserve. During a past glacial advance this boulder was carried c. 50 km from the Fiordland mountains.	45°31′28″S 167°48′37″E
	Truman Track	West Coast, Punakaiki	Wave erosion	Sea cliffs in sandstone and mudstone with a raised shore platform.	42°05′31″S 171°20′20″E
	Tunnel Beach	Otago, Dunedin	Wave erosion, Natural arch	Sandstone sea cliffs and natural bridge, with man made tunnel.	45°55′15″S 170°27′30″E
	Wharariki Beach	Tasman	Wave erosion, natural arch		40°30′10″S 172°40′43″E

== Formations elsewhere ==
Photo	Formation	Region	Type	Summary	Location
	Gog and Magog	Stewart Island / Rakiura	Volcanic plugs		47°11′45″S 167°33′45″E
	Ohira Bay basalt columns	Chatham Island	Terrestrial erosion, volcanic rock		43°48′22″S 176°38′55″W

== See also ==
- List of caves of New Zealand
- List of rock formations
- Stratigraphy of New Zealand
- Geomorphology
