= Blackhead (New Zealand) =

Point in Dunedin, New Zealand

Coordinates: 45°55′55″S 170°25′55″E

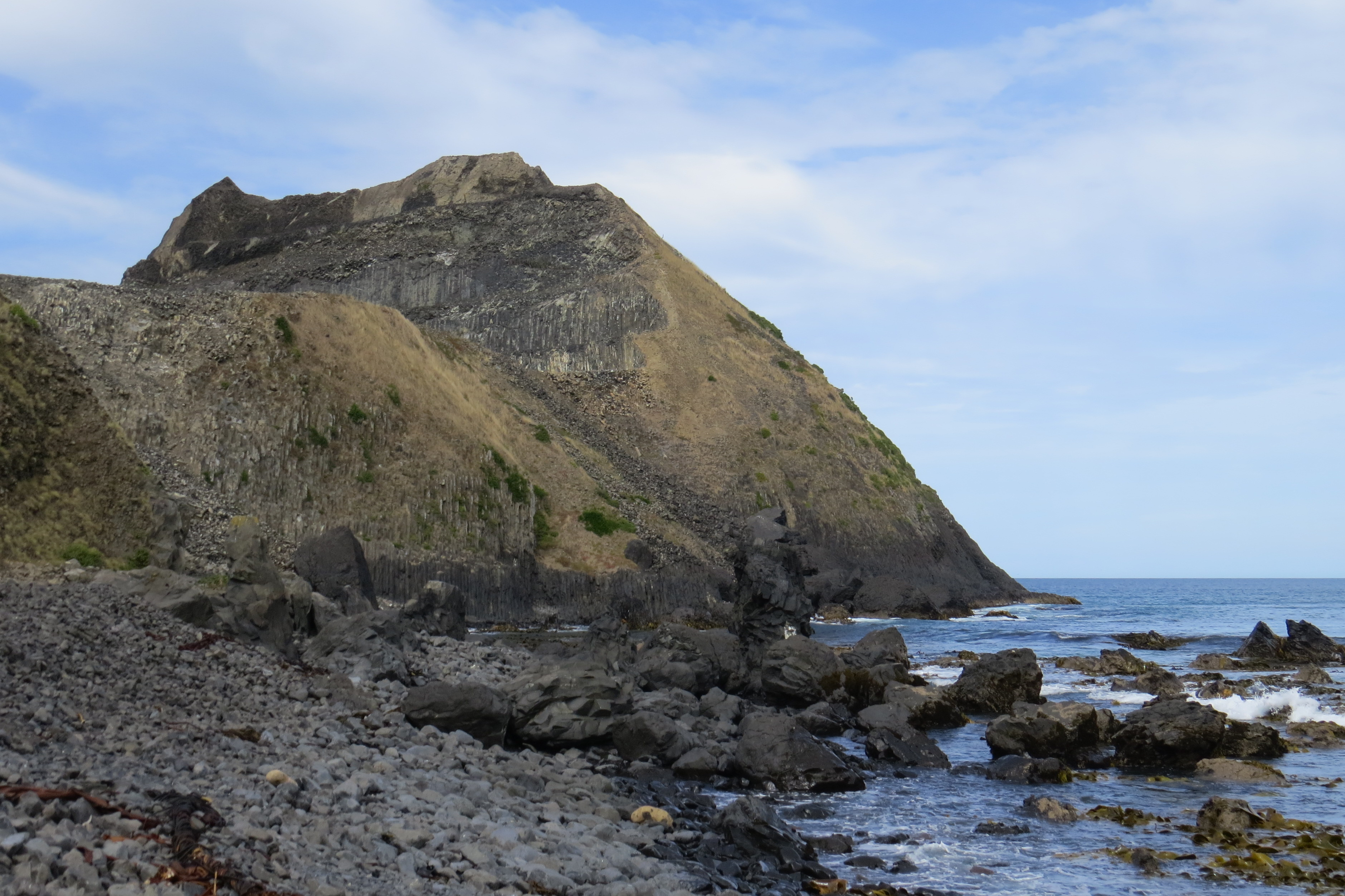
Blackhead

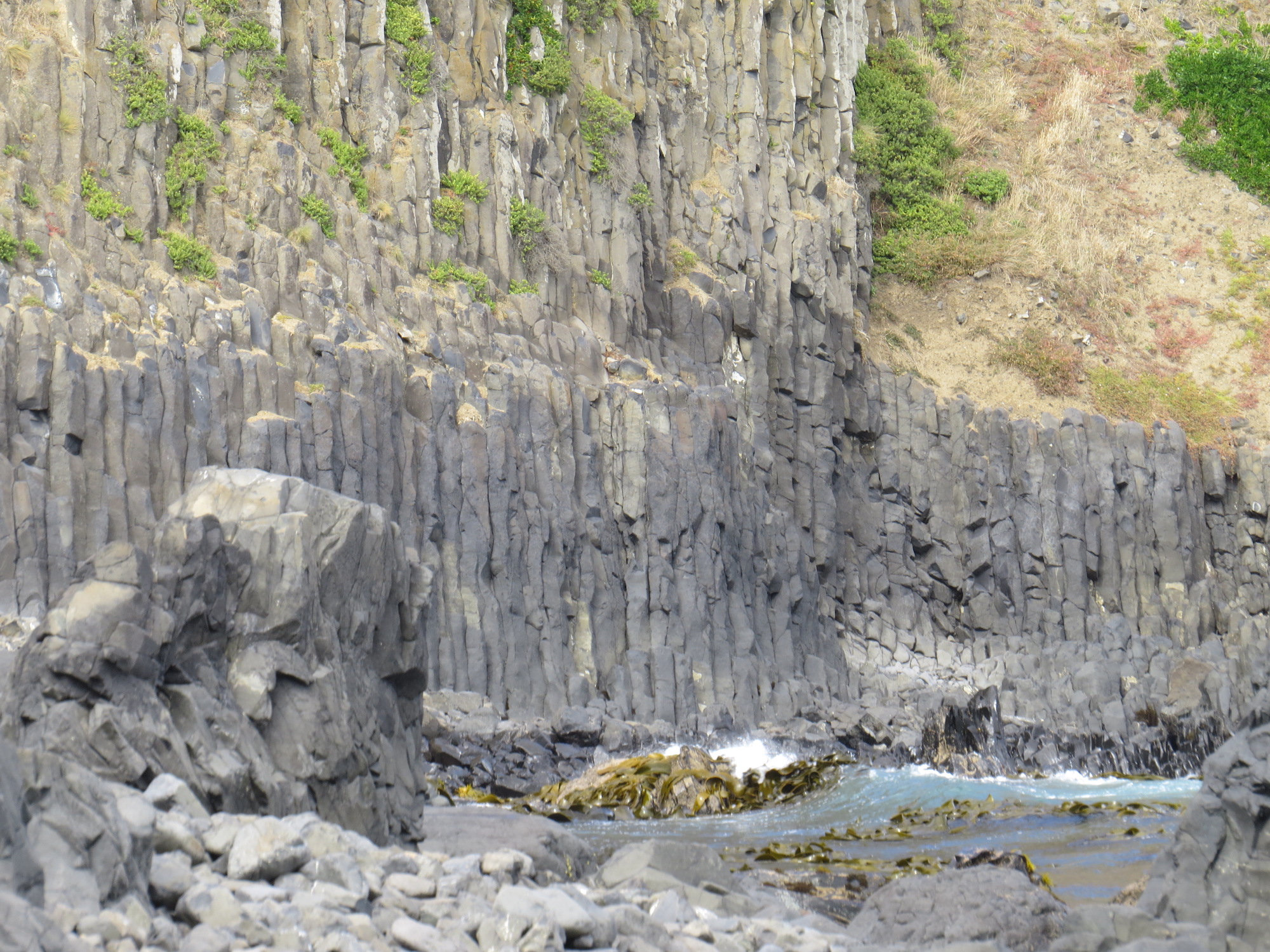
Columnar basalt at Blackhead is protected by legal covenant.

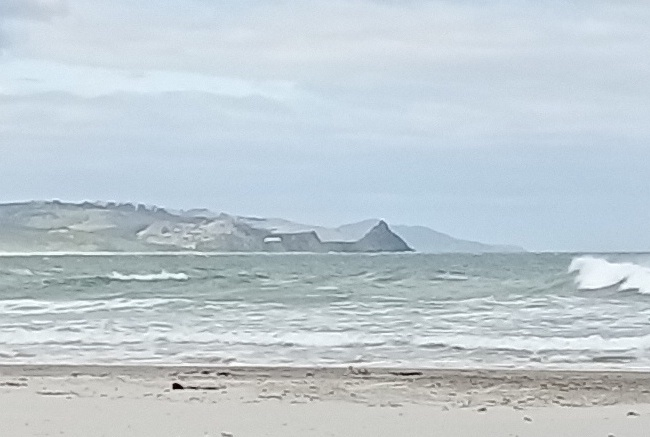
Blackhead as seen from Brighton Beach, eight kilometres to the south-west

Blackhead is a promontory on the coast of Otago, New Zealand. It lies within the city limits of Dunedin, some 10 kilometres (6.2 mi) southwest of the city centre. The promontory extends some 500 metres into the ocean, and rises to a height of a little over 100 metres (330 ft). Māori names for Blackhead include Te Wai o Tinarau (the waters of Tinarau) and Makereatu (to leave a seed).

The area of coast to the east of Blackhead is rugged and steep, with many cliff prominences. The tourist attraction of Tunnel Beach lies in this area, 3 km from Blackhead. To the west, the coast is more low-lying with beaches. The community of Waldronville is located here, some 1500 metres from Blackhead, close to the mouth of the Kaikorai Stream. A beach under the shadow of the quarry, Blackhead Beach, is a popular local surfing spot.

Geologically, Blackhead formed around a peripheral vent of the Dunedin Volcano about 10 mya, the eroded and long-extinct remains of which form the ridge of hills surrounding Otago Harbour. Notable features of Blackhead relating to its origins include basalt columns, similar to those located at Second Beach, several kilometres to the east. Some of these are readily viewed by the public, such as the series of columns at the western end, which are accessible from Waldronville and Blackhead Beaches. Many of the more spectacular formations, such as the "Roman Baths" and "The Docks" are much harder and more hazardous to access, as they lie on the seaward side of the outcrop. Another feature which is equally difficult to access is Caversham Cavern, one of the largest sea caves on the Otago coast.

== Quarry ==
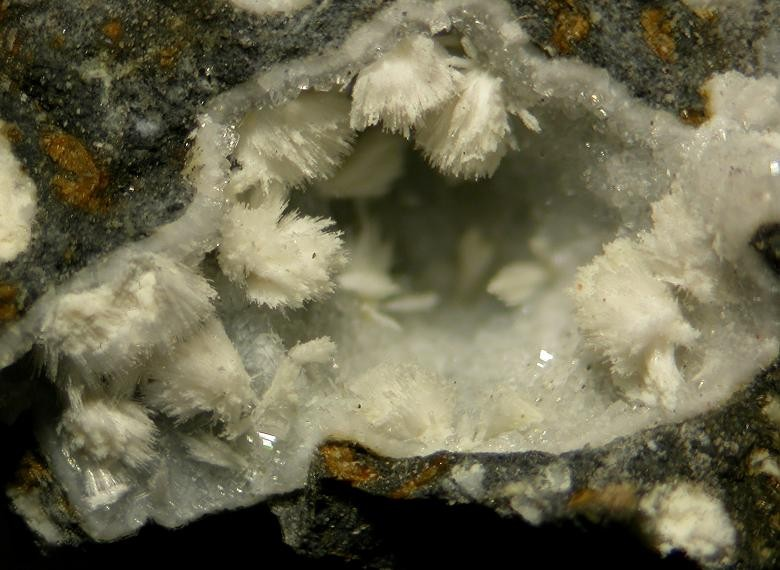
Gonnardite a kind of zeolite found at Blackhead Quarry.

Blackhead is the site of an active quarry, Blackhead Quarry, which has been operating since the 1950s, and is currently a joint venture between Palmer & Sons and Fulton Hogan. Around 120,000 tonnes of rock aggregate is produced annually, consisting mainly of basalt and with small quantities of natrolite, phillipsite, calcite, olivine, chabazite, and thomsonite. This is mainly used for roading chip. The basalt columns are not quarried; they are protected under a covenant. During the 1980s, Fulton Hogan proposed to quarry the centre of the headland down to 50 m below sea level and form a boat harbour in the northeast. This was effectively blocked by a conservation group, The Friends of Blackhead, which was formed specifically to oppose the proposals.

== See also ==
- List of rock formations of New Zealand
