= Glenledi =

Coordinates: 46.1929°S 170.1003°E

Glenledi, also known as Bull Creek, is a small coastal farming and holiday settlement to the east of Milton, New Zealand, in the Otago region of New Zealand's South Island. It lies at the north end of Chrystall's Beach, six kilometres northeast along the coast from Toko Mouth. The small Glenledi Stream enters the Pacific Ocean at Bull Creek, passing through a reef-protected cove surrounded by native bush.

Glenledi is a corruption of the early settler name "Glen Lady", first applied to the area by a daughter of the Reverend Mr Dewes. The name Bull Creek probably from that of early whaler Robert O'Neill, whose strength earned him the nickname "John Bull". The area's Māori name, Moanariri (meaning "angry sea") is still occasionally encountered.
