= Floater (geology) =

Rock fragments detached from original outcrop

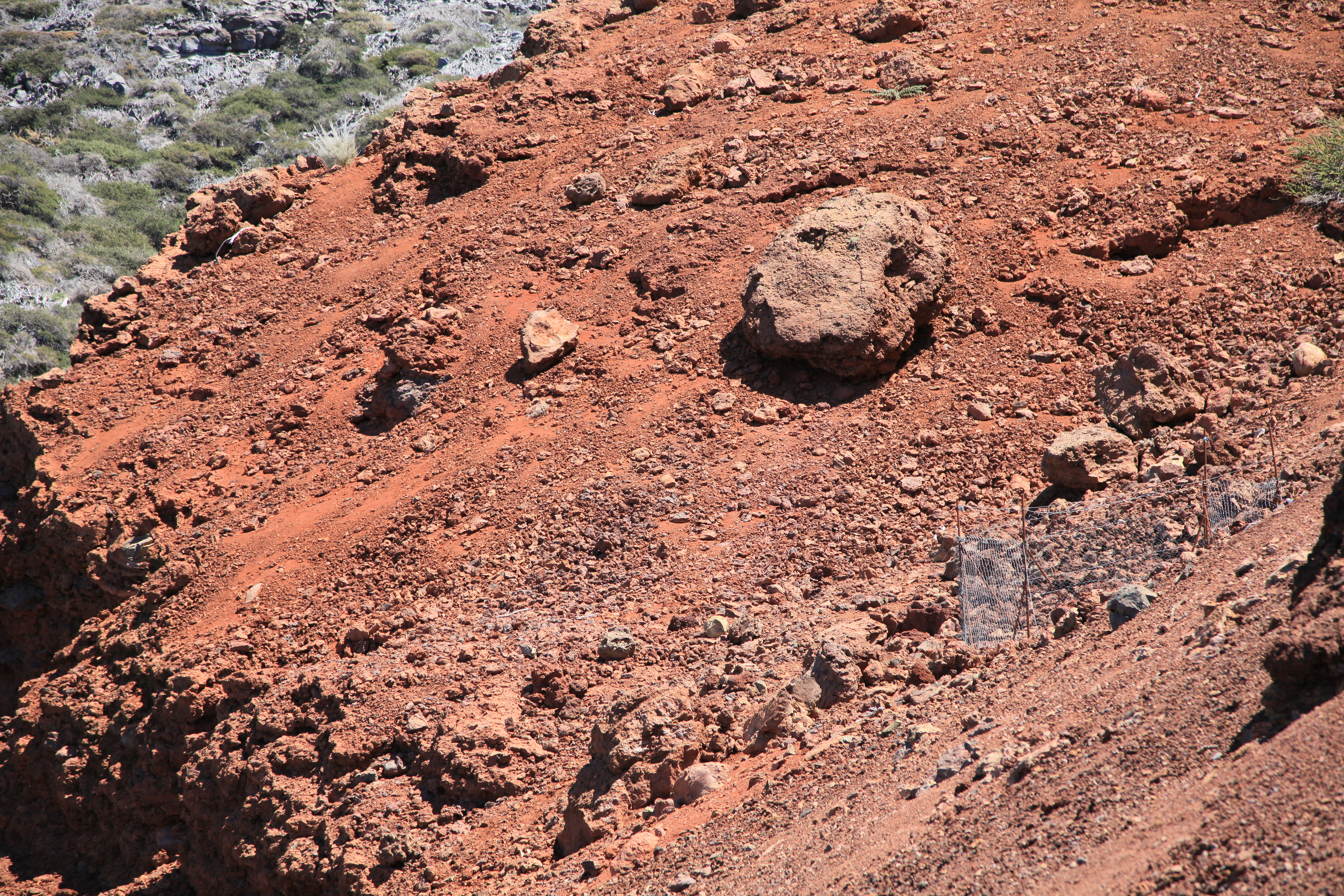
Floaters in La Palma, Canary Island

In geology, a floater or a float is a piece of rock that has been eroded, isolated and transported away from its original outcrop, and it is found within a soil or weathering profile. A floater can also be a bigger rock fragment that is detached from the underlying bedrock.

== Background ==
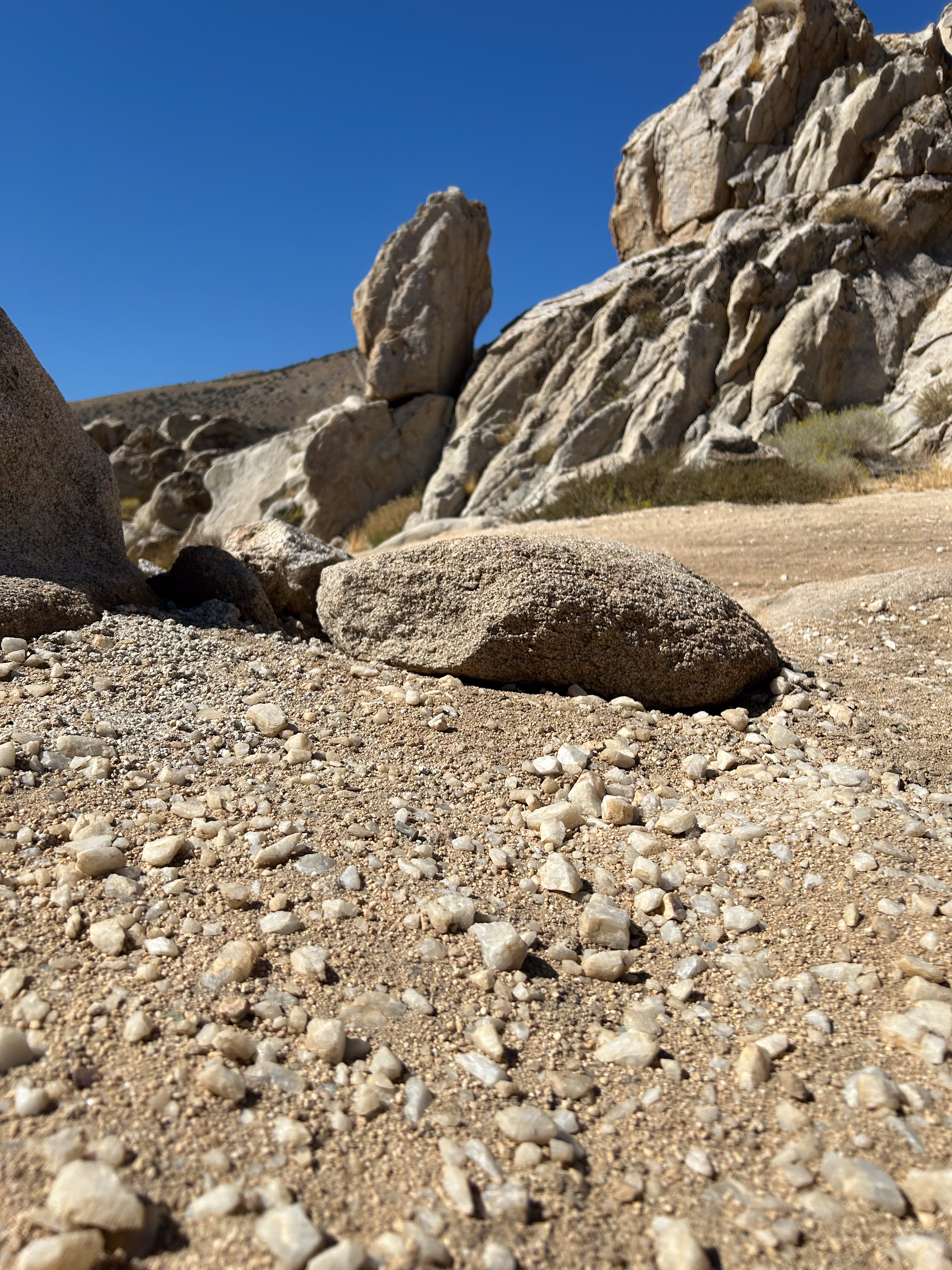
Quartzite floaters at Reno, Nevada

Floaters in the soil horizon above bedrock

Floaters or floats are typically loose rocks that have been transported or detached from their original source (largely through physical weathering) and are normally scattered across the soil profile, or transported by water in rivers or creeks. Often discovered by excavation, floaters can also be isolated rock debris of around a boulder size rock or a larger one. Smaller ones may be thrusted aside or be shifted a bit by an earth auger. Large float rocks can be mistaken for the underlying bedrock, which ensues in underestimating the deepness and density of soils, regoliths, and weathering outlines.

Loose rock pieces laying around on the surface usually make it difficult for geologists to determine how far they have been shifted away from the bedrock (after being disconnected by weathering processes). A geologist should spend some time determining whether they are dealing with an outcrop, a subcrop, or a large float, as it is impossible to ascertain that the exposed rock is attached to the bedrock.

=== Origin ===
As rocks weather irregularly, water flows into the rock along the fractures, where it prevails in particular physical areas within the rock. Self-reinforcing weathering may follow the tenacity of unweathered or marginally weathered mother rock through a mold of detached, weathered material (i.e. corestones). The more resistant rock is interstratified with the less resistant lithologies. Sandstone and shale in sedimentary orders are typically stratified, such as in flysch settings. Rock decomposition can evade the more unyielding rock as the less impervious material is converted to saprolite or soil. Downward movement can happen due to gravitational settling, with some sabotaging by soil bioirrigation caused by burrowing animals.

== Transportation ==
Tree roots have the ability to pervade the bedrock and raise the formerly unattached fragments, and therefore tree uprooting is one of the most common cause of floaters in woody settings. Rock pieces are upraised as part of the root mass, which settle into uproot holes or on the ground at a higher altitude. The frost weathering process can maneuver rock pieces above the ground, in addition to animal and human excavation. Rock debris can also be transported to a site and move their way downward. Transportation of floaters in the modern era mainly occurs due to mining, construction, and landscaping activities in general. Rock creep can also move rock pieces that are formed by weathering of surface bedrock outcropping downslope.

== Human use ==
In prehistory, as far back as the paleolithic era, floaters would have been easily obtained and used by humans and early hominids as stone tools, due to their widespread nature through the soil profile. Early humans used them to create a variety of equipment made of either ground stone or knapped stone, as the Stone Age was a period of widespread stone tool usage. Throughout human history, people have transported stone for construction and for making hearths and fire bowls, at times with help of domesticated animals. In Ancient Egypt, easily worked, soft sedimentary rocks were quarried for construction as early as 4000 BCE.

In modern real estate, floaters may be expensive to remove, though this depends on their size. However, a building constructed on them could compromise the structure with time.

== Gallery ==
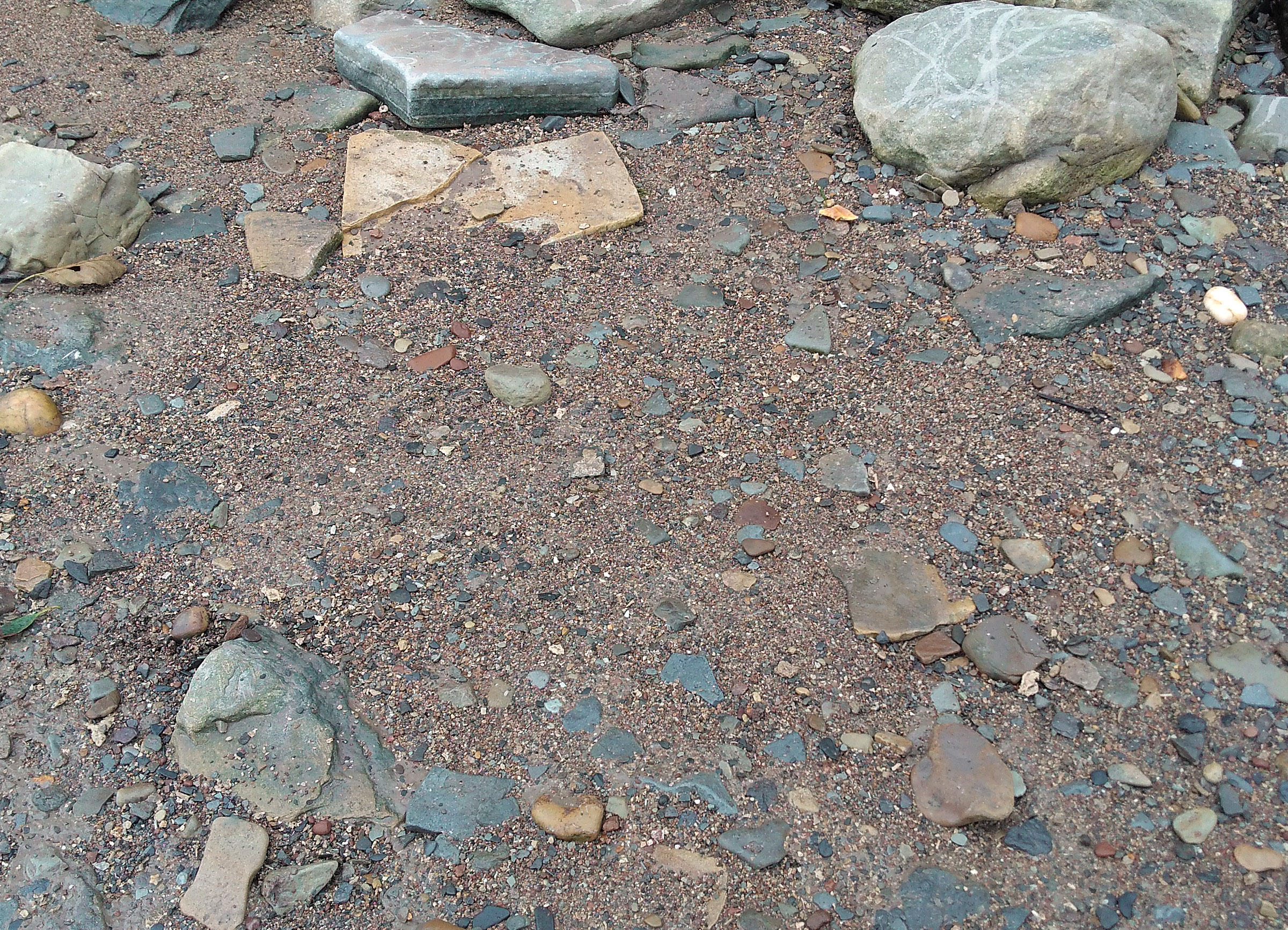
Floaters on beach in Sedbury, Gloucestershire

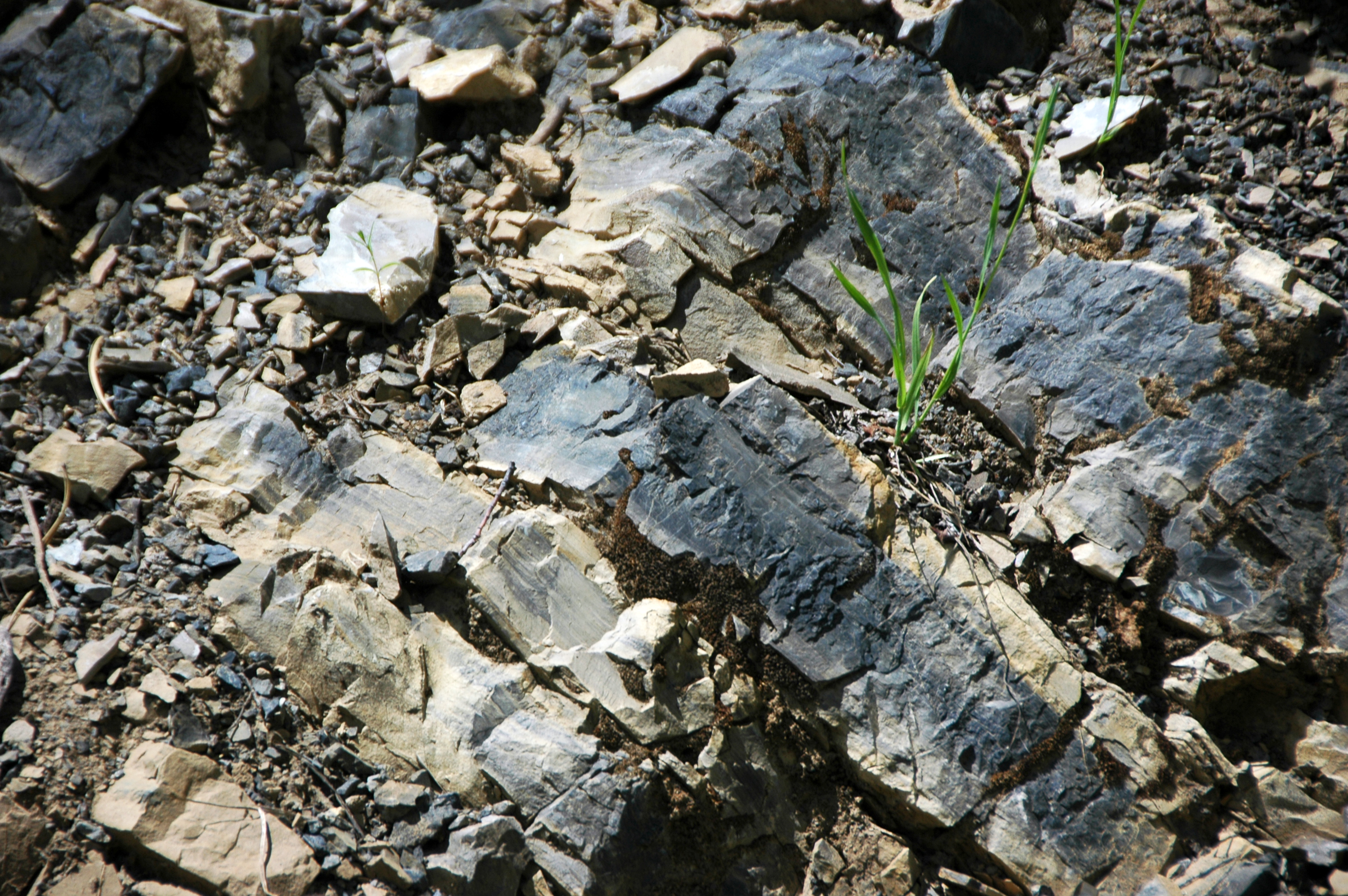
Preuss Range, Idaho, USA

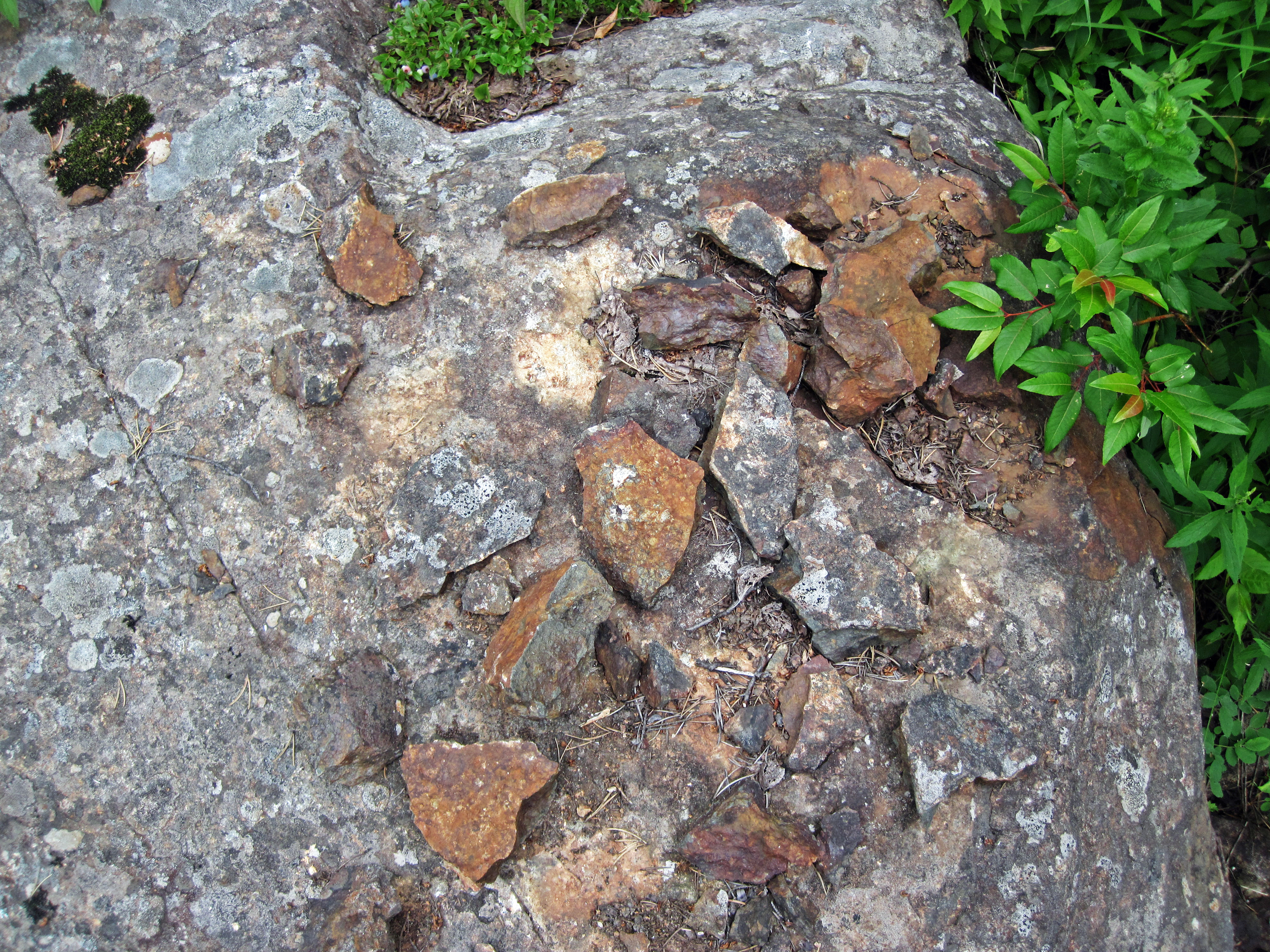
East of Timmins, Ontario, Canada

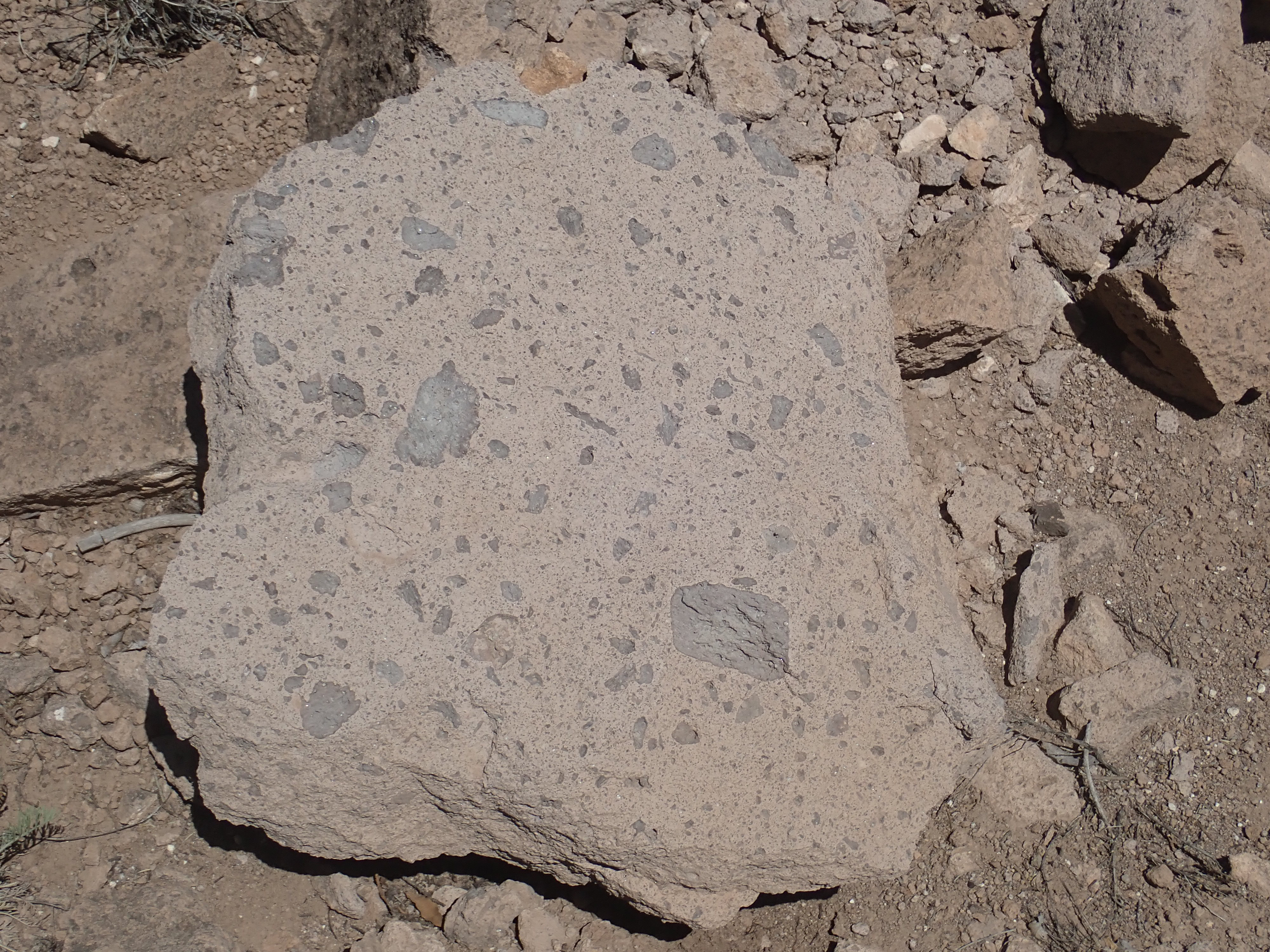
A large tuff floater south of White Rock, New Mexico

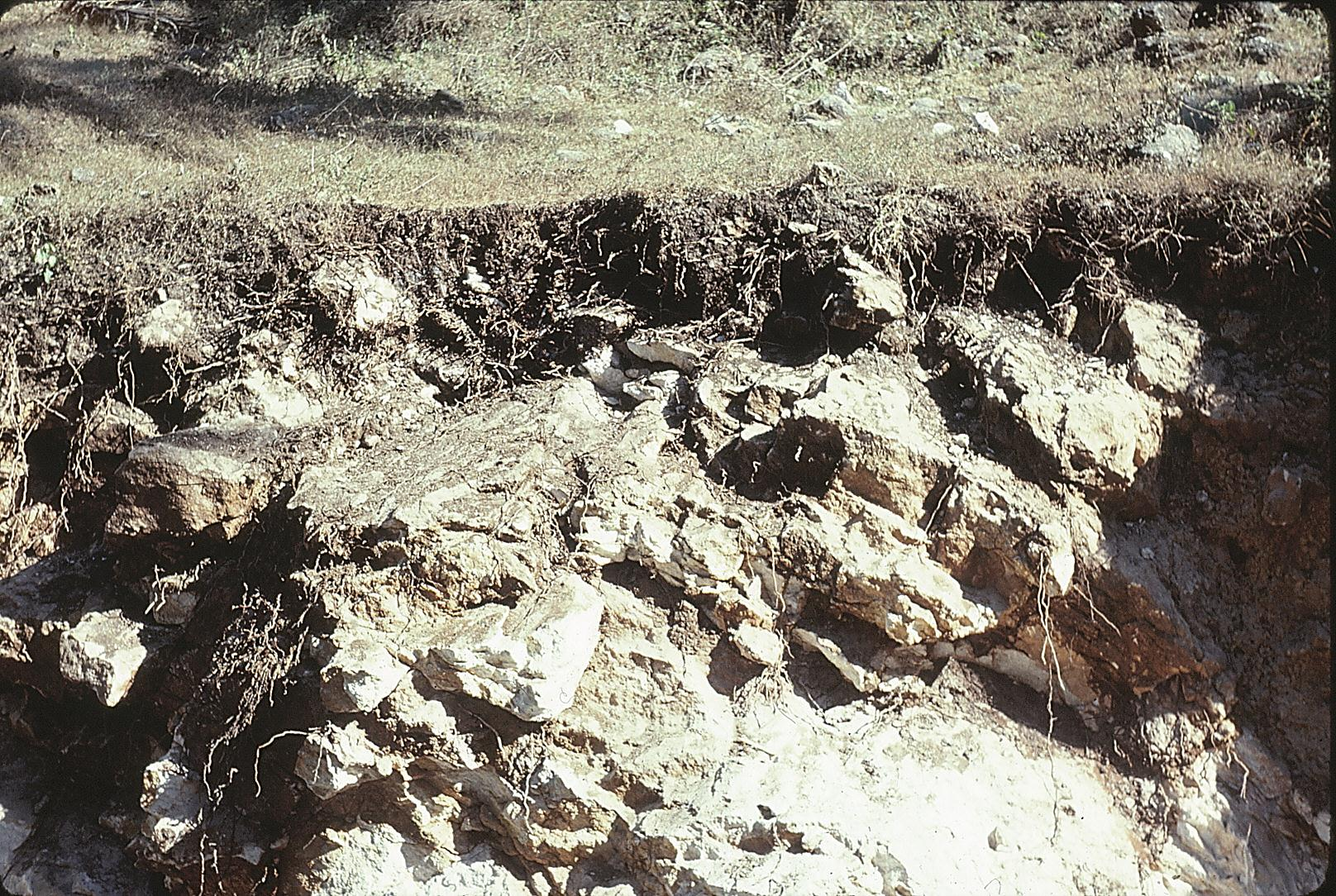
Limestone floaters in Sri Lanka

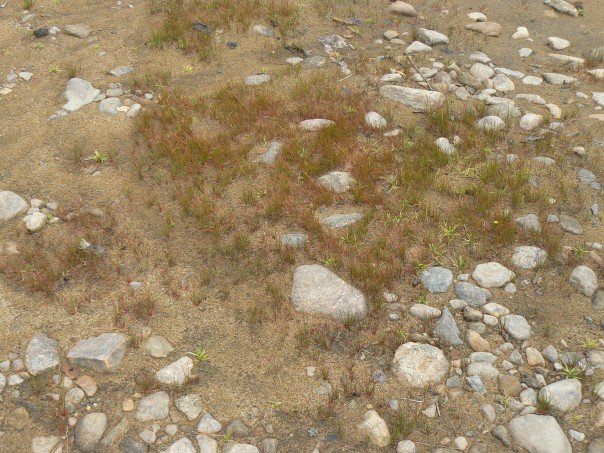
Floaters by the Great Sacandaga Lake in New York

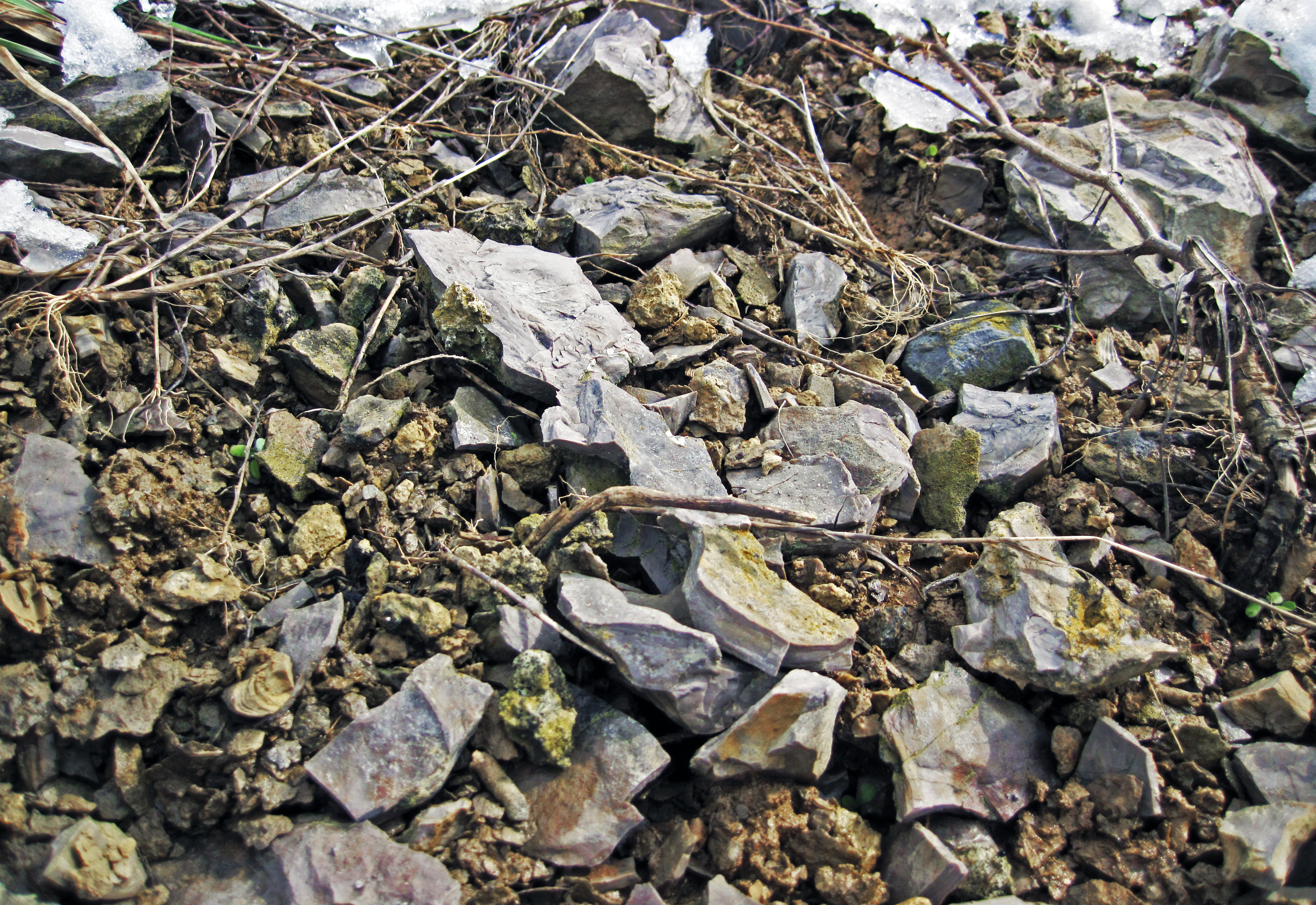
Upper Ordovician floaters in Garrard County, Kentucky

== See also ==
- Clastic rock
- Rock fragment
- Stone run
- Pebble
- Blockfield
- Rockfall
- Scree
