= Split Apple Rock =

Rock formation of New Zealand

Coordinates: 41.01829°S 173.02016°E

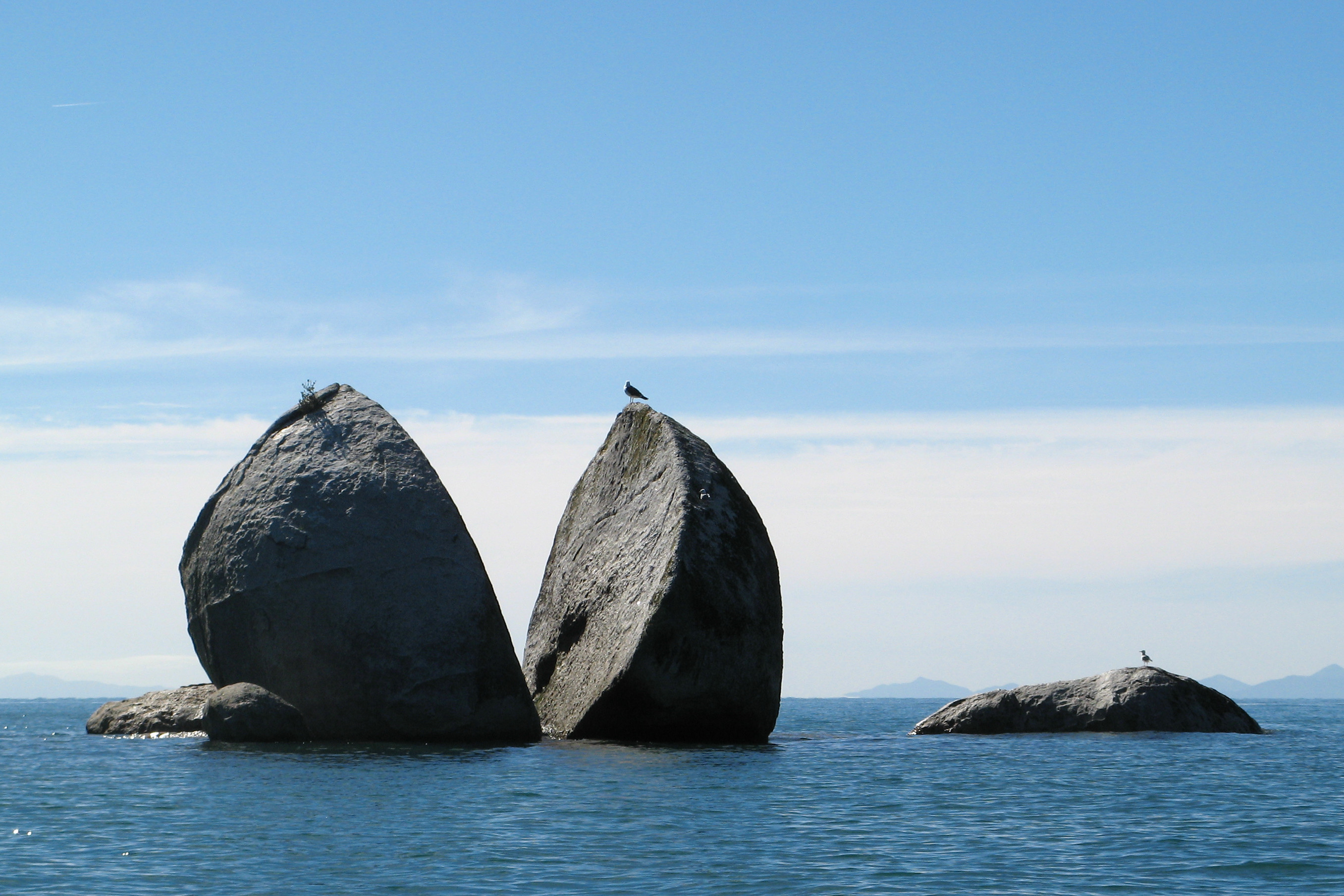
Split Apple Rock

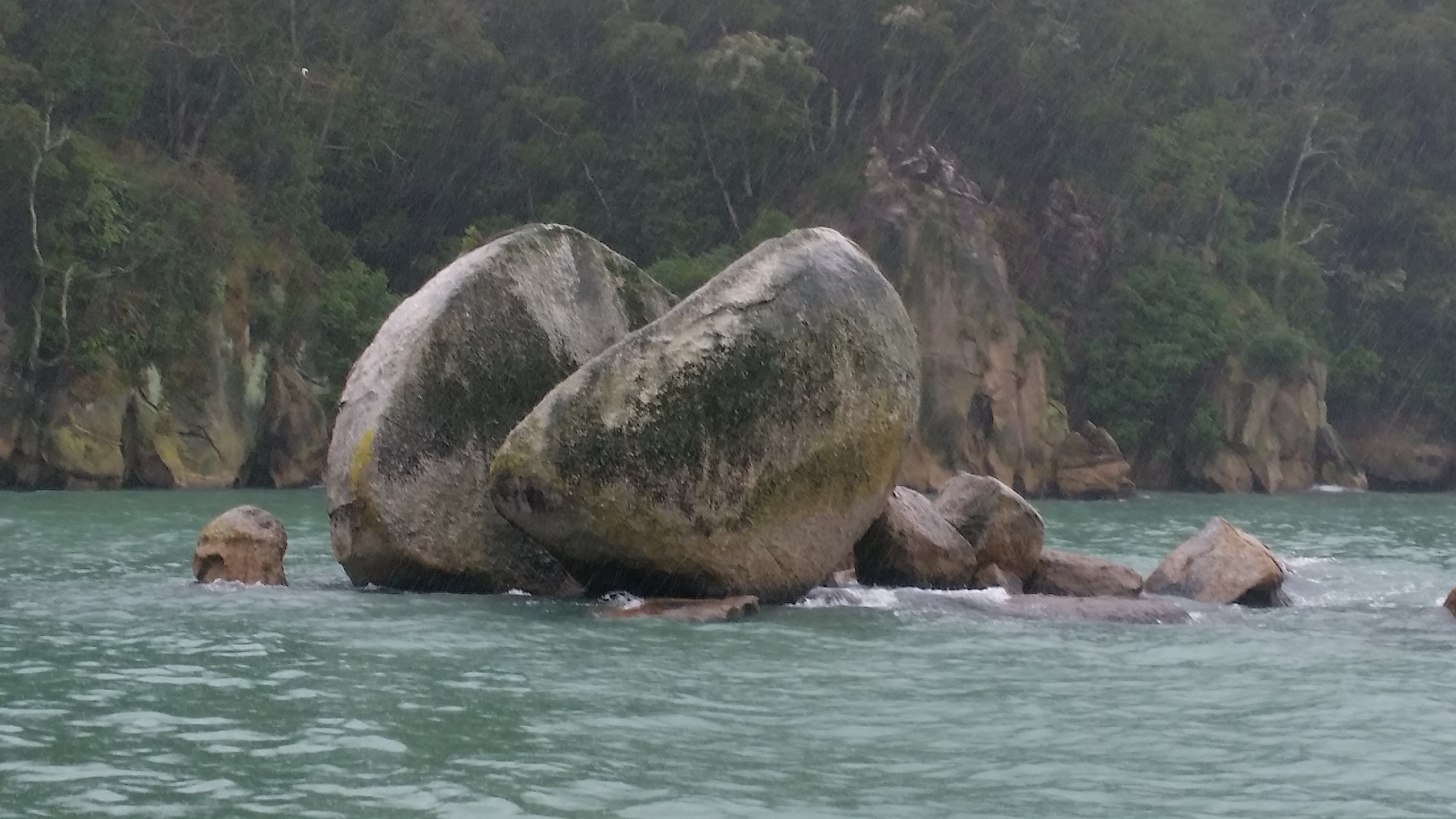
Split Apple Rock 2019

Tokangawhā / Split Apple Rock is a rock formation in Tasman Bay / Te Tai-o-Aorere off the northern coast of the South Island of New Zealand. Made of granite from the cretaceous, it is in the shape of an apple which has been cut in half. The cleft to produce two sides of the 'apple' was a naturally occurring joint. Joints occur commonly in granite and are planes of weakness that rain and waves exploit. The traditional Māori myth for the formation describes two gods breaking apart the rock.

It is a popular tourist attraction in the waters of Tasman Bay, approximately 50 metres off the coast between Kaiteretere and Mārahau. The rock sits in shallow water at low tide and is accessible by wading. It is also a point of interest for the many tourist boats and pleasure craft which operate along the shores of the Abel Tasman National Park. The name Split Apple Rock was made official in 1988, and was officially altered to Tokangawhā / Split Apple Rock in August 2014.

== See also ==
- List of rock formations of New Zealand
