= Wairere Boulders =

Nature reserve and tourist attraction in New Zealand

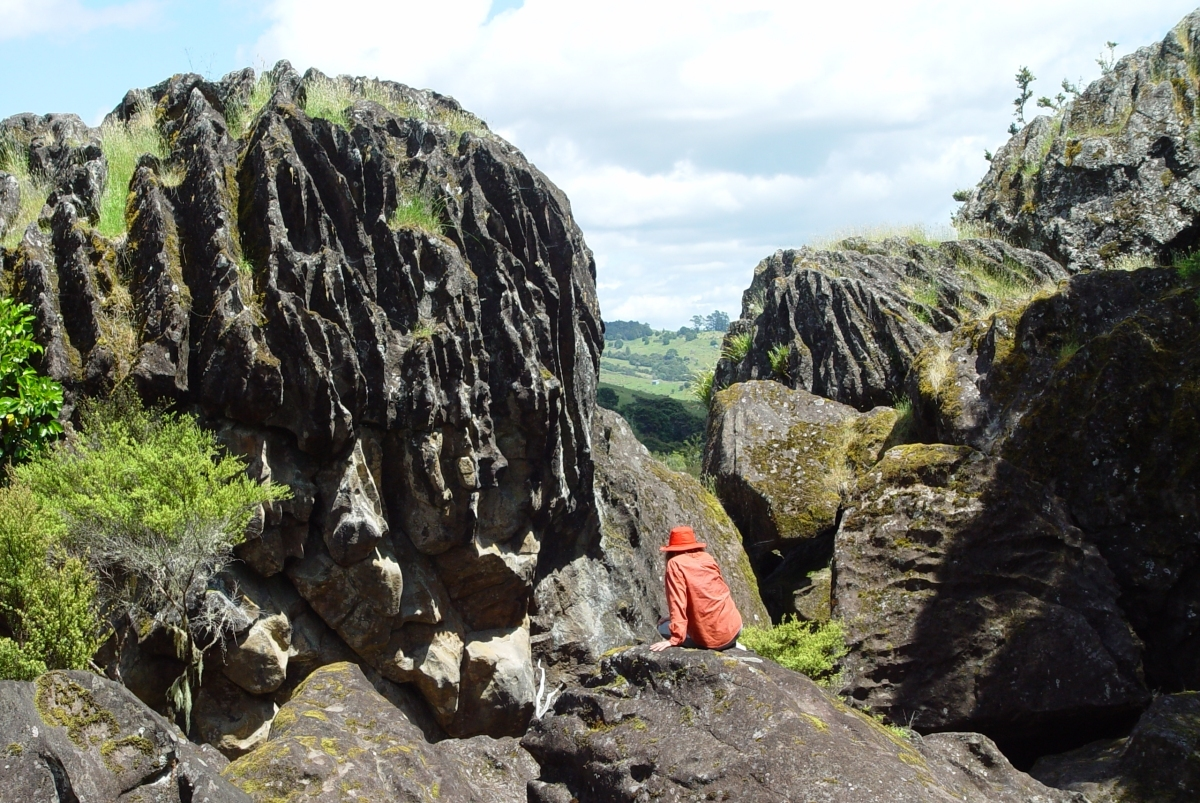
- Legal status: Company
- Coordinates: 35.3747°S 173.5963°E
- Services: Visitor attraction, campsite, accommodation
- Owners: Mark and Leonie Norton
- Website: wairereboulders.co.nz

Wairere Boulders is a privately owned nature reserve and tourist attraction at Horeke in the south Hokianga region of Northland, New Zealand. The property contains geologically rare rock formations. Visitors to the property can walk the various boulder and river trails, climb the boulders (bouldering), kayak the river and estuary, and stay at the campsite.

== Ownership ==
Wairere Boulders was initially developed as a tourist attraction by Felix and Rita Schaad, a couple originally from Switzerland who owned the property from the 1980s. They opened the site for visitors in 2000, after 4 years work developing tracks, bridges and lookouts. The property was sold in 2017 and again in 2023.

The 140 hectares (350 acres) property was purchased by Mark & Leonie Norton in 2023. They have added hot showers, a community barn, and now also cater for Bouldering. The property includes farmland, and the owners raise highland cattle and sheep.

== Visitor attractions ==
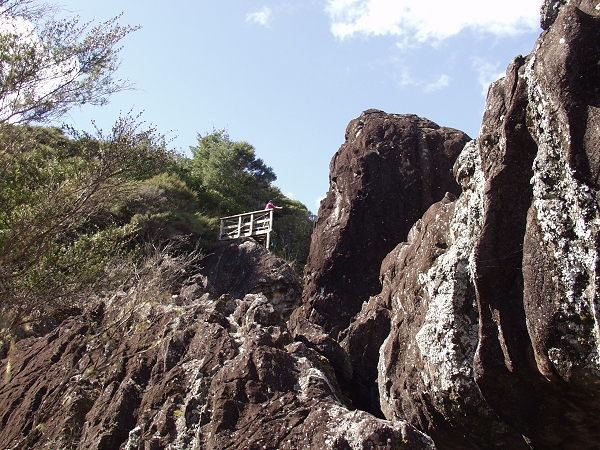
Wairere boulders and viewing platform

The key attraction at the property is the large and unusual fluted basalt rock formations.

=== Walks ===
There are several walks ranging from 40 minutes to 2 hours, taking visitors under, over and around the boulders. The gigantic rocks are surrounded by subtropical rainforest, where much of the flora is labelled. Added interest for families is provided with rock animals, fairy houses and a swimming hole.

=== Kayaking ===
Kayaking is available on the boulder estuary / river. Due to the tidal nature of the boulder river, kayaking is tide dependent. It is possible to kayak down through mangroves and out to the Hokianga Harbour.

=== Bouldering ===
Bouldering is supported by a number of local groups who have mapped and graded a large number of the hundreds of boulders on the property..

== Geology ==
Wairere valley formation

The Wairere boulders have moved down the hillsides from an eroding Pliocene basalt lava flow of the Kerikeri volcanic group formerly known as Horeke basalts. Erosion of the clay under the basalt plateau (cap) started to create a valley; the edges of the cap broke off and blocks moved towards the bottom of the valley, where they accumulated. They now fill a portion of the valley which is about 1.4 km long and up to 350 m wide.

Many of the boulders have deep solution basins and fluting formed on their surfaces as they very slowly slid down the valley sides - a particularly good example of the relatively rare phenomenon of karst formation on basalt (sometimes known as proto-karst). This phenomenon was documented by geologists as early as the 1920s-1940s in Hawaii and New Zealand. Usually karst landforms are formed by solution of calcareous rocks (e.g. limestone and marble) by mildly acidic percolating water. At Wairere, and elsewhere, basalt has been dissolved, probably over a much longer interval of time, by the production of weakly acidic humic acid in the leaf litter that collects around the roots of plants that grow on the top of the boulders, usually beneath a forest canopy. On the top of the boulders this humic acid has etched out solution basins 20–50 cm across and of similar depth. Humic acid seeping down the sides of the boulders has, over thousands of years, dissolved deep, near-vertical flutes out of the hard basalt. In some places the fluting is no longer vertical as the boulders have rolled over or tilted since it was formed.

Basalt karst occurs in a number of places in northern New Zealand with some of the best examples at Wairere Boulders, but also at Stoney Batter, Waiheke Island; Ti Point, Leigh; Lake Manuwai, Kerikeri; and Stoney Knowe, Helena Bay. Excellent examples of karst features developed on basalt boulders can be seen on Norfolk Island, in the Tasman Sea.

== See also ==
- List of rock formations in New Zealand
