= Toko Mouth =

Locality in Clutha District, Otago Region, New Zealand

Coordinates: 46.21947°S 170.043147°E

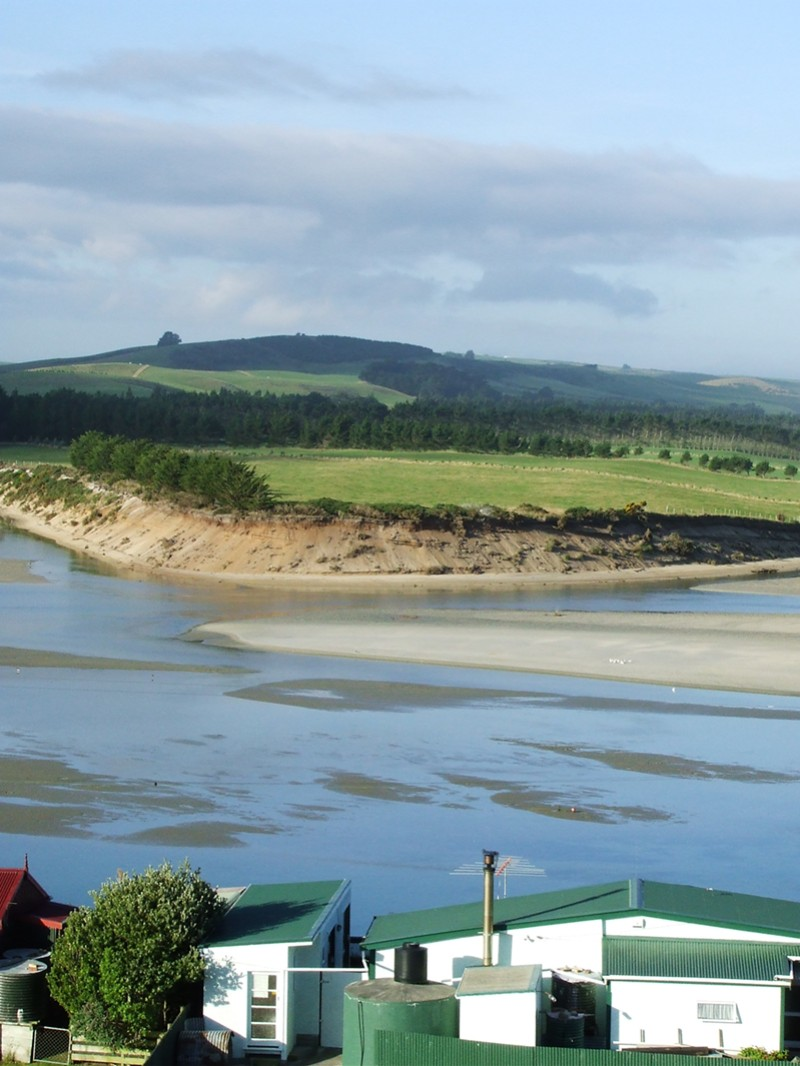
Toko Mouth, looking north across the estuary.

Toko Mouth is a settlement close to the south bank of the mouth of the Tokomairaro River, some 50 kilometres (31 mi) south of Dunedin and 15 kilometres (9.3 mi) southeast of Milton in Otago, New Zealand.

The settlement comprises some 70 holiday homes, of which a small percentage are occupied by permanent residents. It is accessible by road from Milton and also via a coastal back-road from Kaitangata, 20 kilometres (12 mi) to the southwest.

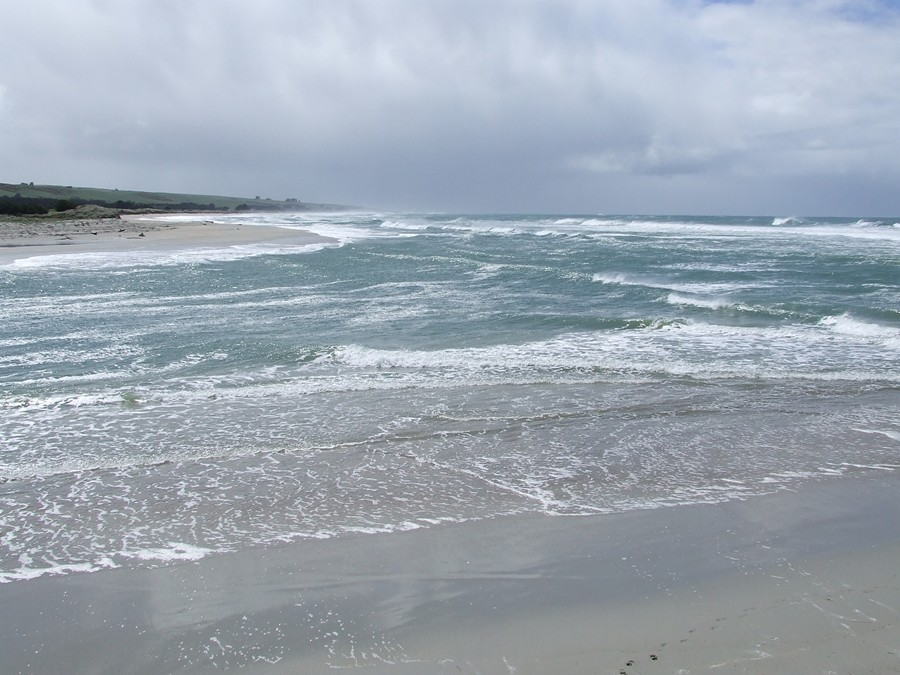
High seas buffet the mouth of the river.

Several beaches surround the area: Chrystall's Beach and Glenledi/Bull Creek to the north and Measly Beach to the south. Chrystall's Beach features the local landmark of Cook's Head Rock, a rock formation with hexagonal columns. Bull Creek is a popular site, as the small beach is surrounded by a stand of native bush and is sheltered by a reef. Swimming is relatively safe at both Bull Creek and Toko Mouth, though rips are common at Chrystall's Beach.

The estuary just inside the mouth provides a food source for several species of water birds, including oystercatchers, spoonbills, gulls, and herons. A reef is outside the southern side of the mouth. Shortly up river, the wetland is home to a notable population of fernbird and the occasional bittern.

From the earlier months of 2007 it has become apparent that the spit which buffers the river mouth has been moving erratically with each successive tide, wearing down to nothing but a stub. Heavy rain and wind has caused this occurrence.
