= Pebble =

Small rock fragment

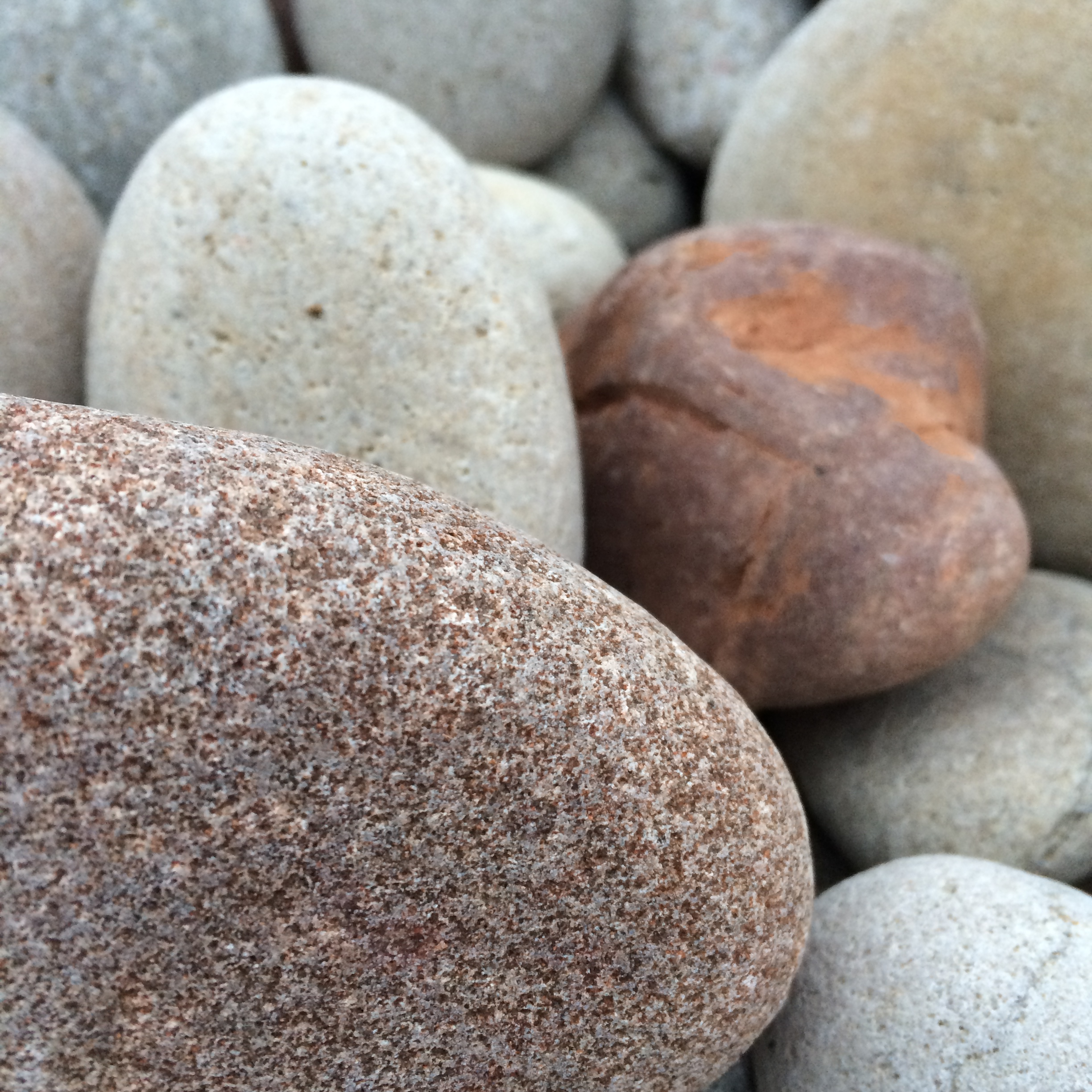
Close view of pebbles

A pebble is a clast of rock with a particle size of 4–64 mm (0.16–2.52 in) based on the Udden-Wentworth scale of sedimentology. Pebbles are generally considered larger than granules (2–4 mm (0.079–0.157 in) in diameter) and smaller than cobbles (64–256 mm (2.5–10.1 in) in diameter). Pebble tools are among the earliest known man-made artifacts, dating from the Palaeolithic period of human history.

A beach composed chiefly of surface pebbles is commonly termed a shingle beach. This type of beach has armoring characteristics with respect to wave erosion, as well as ecological niches that provide habitat for animals and plants.

Inshore banks of shingle (large quantities of pebbles) exist in some locations, such as the entrance to the River Ore, England, where the moving banks of shingle give notable navigational challenges.

Pebbles come in various colors and textures and can have streaks, known as veins, of quartz or other minerals. Pebbles are mostly smooth but, depending on how frequently they come in contact with the sea, they can have marks of contact with other rocks or other pebbles. Pebbles left above the high water mark may have growths of organisms such as lichen on them, signifying the lack of contact with seawater.

== Location ==
Pebbles on Earth exist in two types of locations – on the beaches of various oceans and seas, and inland where ancient seas used to cover the land. Then, when the seas retreated, the rocks became landlocked. Here, they entered lakes and ponds, and form in rivers, travelling into estuaries where the smoothing continues in the sea.

Beach pebbles and river pebbles (also known as river rock) are distinct in their geological formation and appearance.

Manufactured Pebbles-These are made from natural stones such as marble, granite, and sandstone. Manufactured Pebbles are designed to specified sizes and forms, making them flexible for many purposes.

=== Beach ===
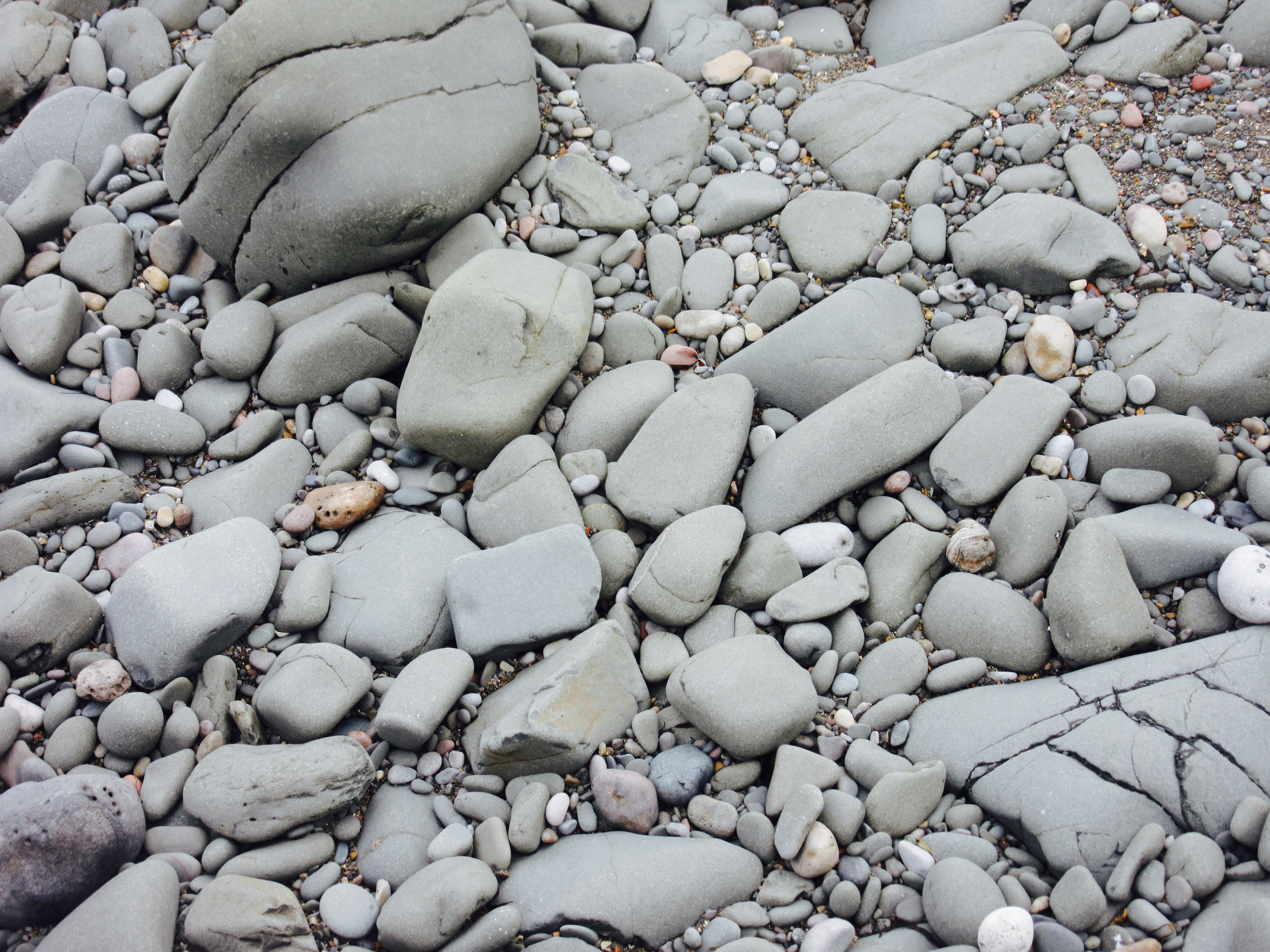
Differently sized rocks and pebbles on a beach in northern England

Beach pebbles form gradually over time as the ocean water washes over loose rock particles. The result is a smooth, rounded appearance. The typical size range is from 2 mm to 50 mm. The colors range from translucent white to black, and include shades of yellow, brown, red and green. Some of the more plentiful pebble beaches are along the coast of the Pacific Ocean, beginning in Canada and extending down to the tip of South America in Argentina. Other pebble beaches are in northern Europe (particularly on the beaches of the Norwegian Sea), along the coast of the U.K. and Ireland, on the shores of Australia, and around the islands of Indonesia and Japan.

=== Inland ===
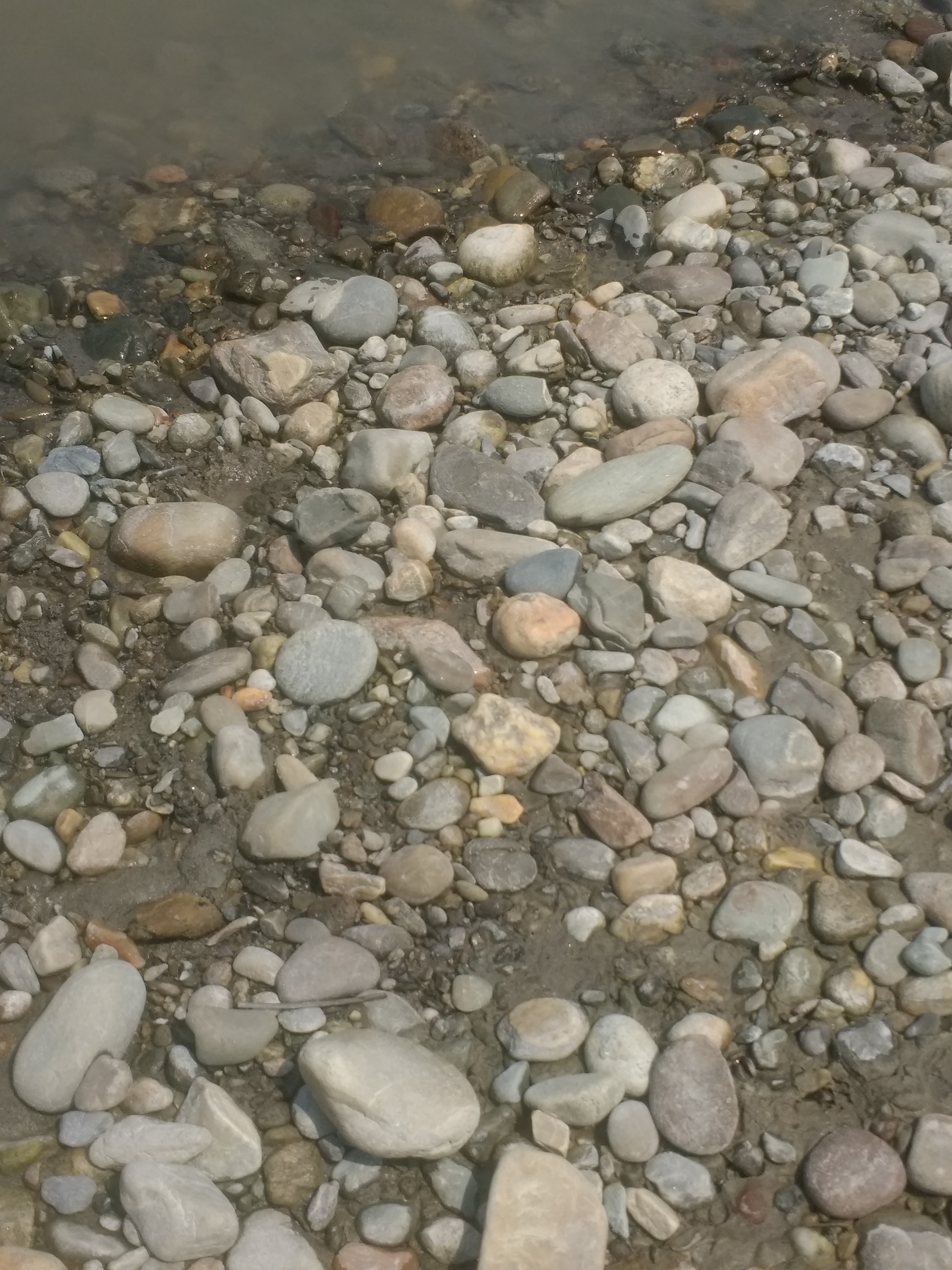
Pebbles on a riverbank

Inland pebbles (river pebbles of river rock) are usually found along the shores of large rivers and lakes. These pebbles form as the flowing water washes over rock particles on the bottom and along the shores of the river. The smoothness and color of river pebbles depends on several factors, such as the composition of the soil of the river banks, the chemical characteristics of the water, and the speed of the current. Because river current is gentler than the ocean waves, river pebbles are usually not as smooth as beach pebbles. The most common colors of river rock are black, grey, green, brown and white.

== Human use ==
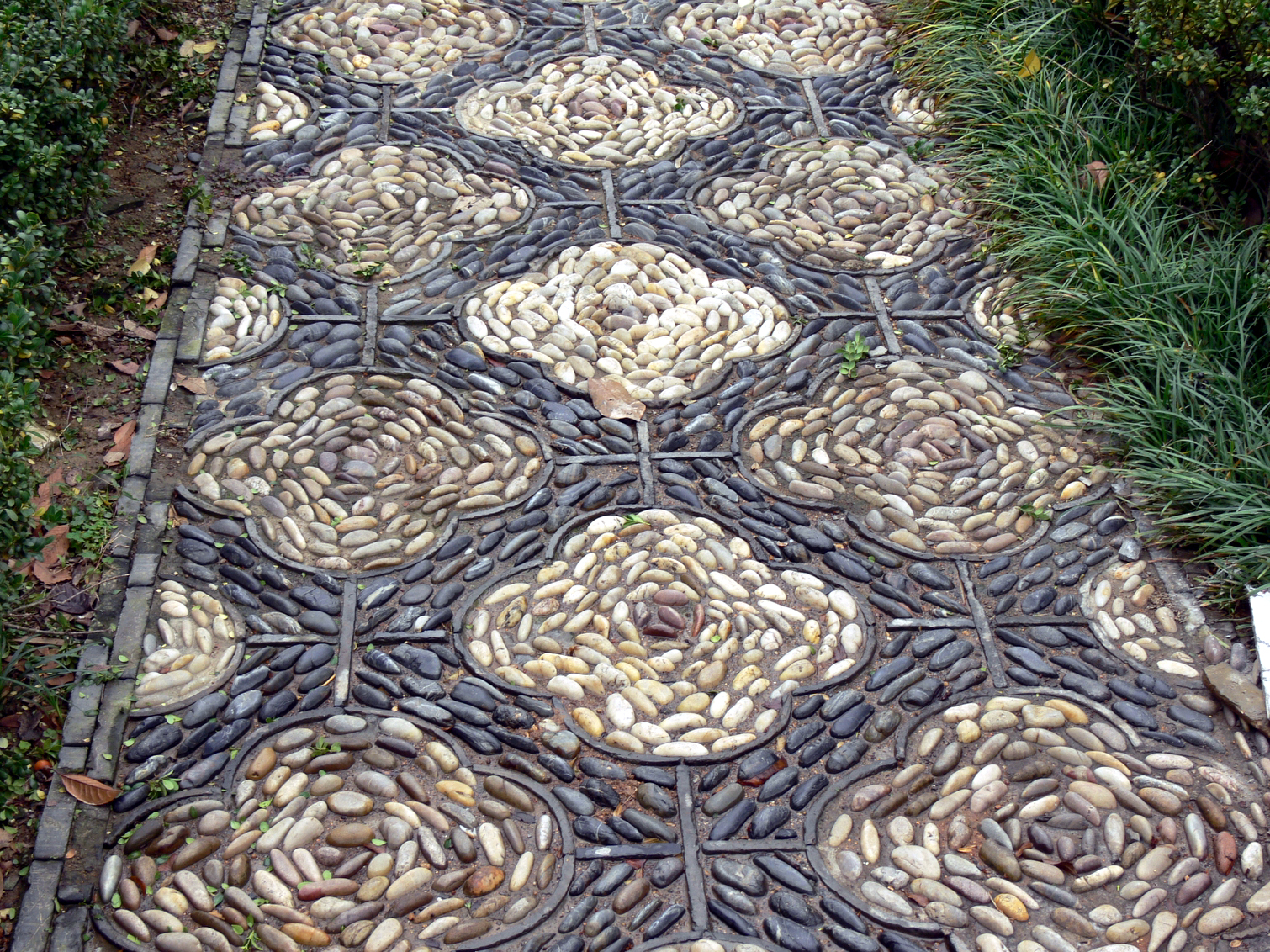
A walkway decorated with pebbles set into concrete

Beach pebbles and river pebbles are used for a variety of purposes, both outdoors and indoors. They can be sorted by colour and size, and they can also be polished to improve the texture and colour. Outdoors, beach pebbles are often used for landscaping, construction and as decorative elements. Beach pebbles are often used to cover walkways and driveways, around pools, in and around plant containers, on patios and decks. Beach and river pebbles are also used to create water-smart gardens in areas where water is scarce. Small pebbles are also used to create living spaces and gardens on the rooftops of buildings. Indoors, pebbles can be used as bookends and paperweights. Large pebbles are also used to create "pet rocks" for children.

== Mars ==
On Mars, slabs of pebbly conglomerate rock have been found and have been interpreted by scientists as having formed in an ancient streambed. The gravels, which were discovered by NASA's Mars rover Curiosity, range from the size of sand particles to the size of golf balls. Analysis has shown that the pebbles were deposited by a stream that flowed at walking pace and was ankle- to hip-deep.

== Gallery ==
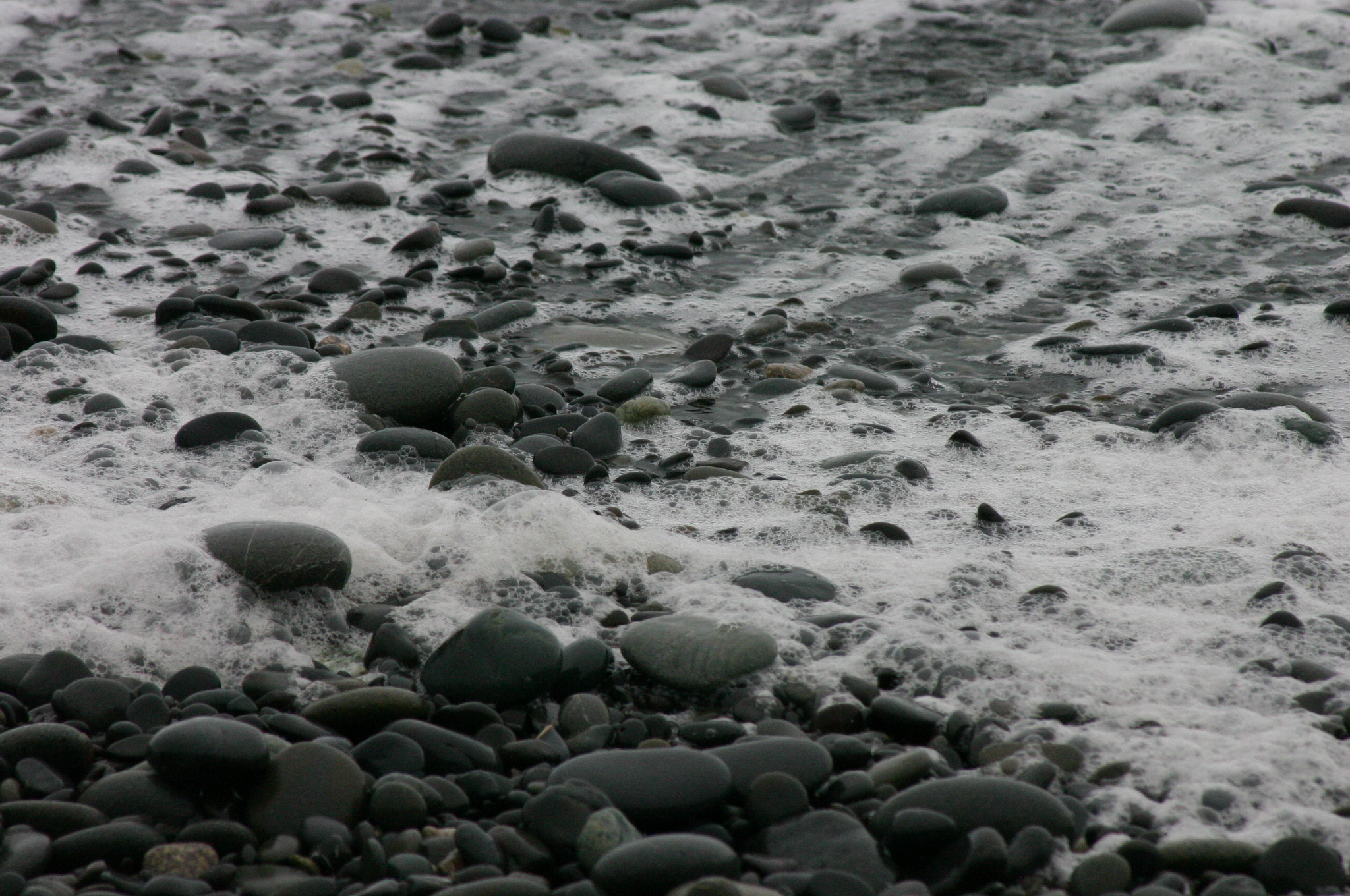
Pebbles given a rounded shape by wave action

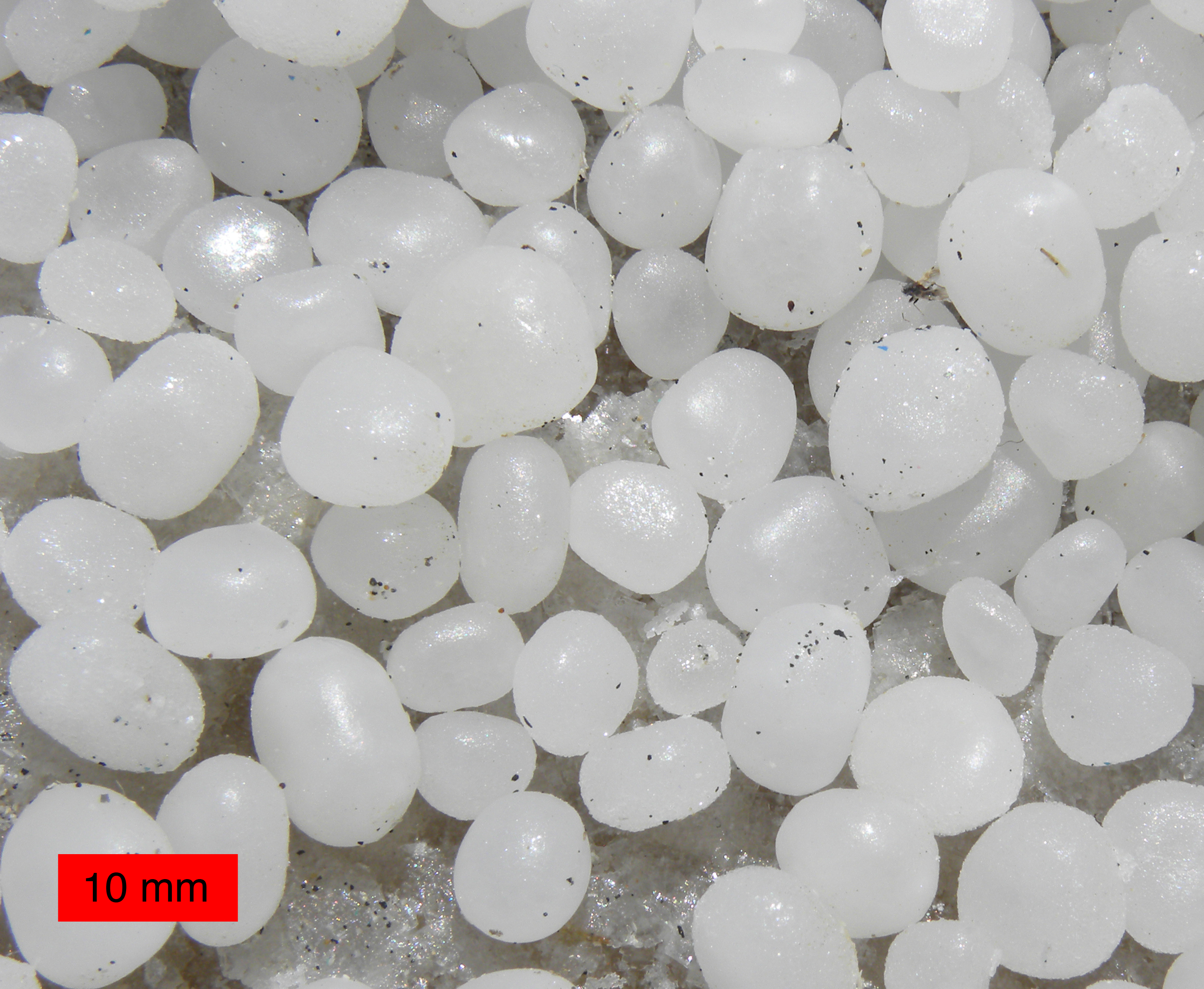
Beach pebbles made of halite; western Dead Sea coast, Israel

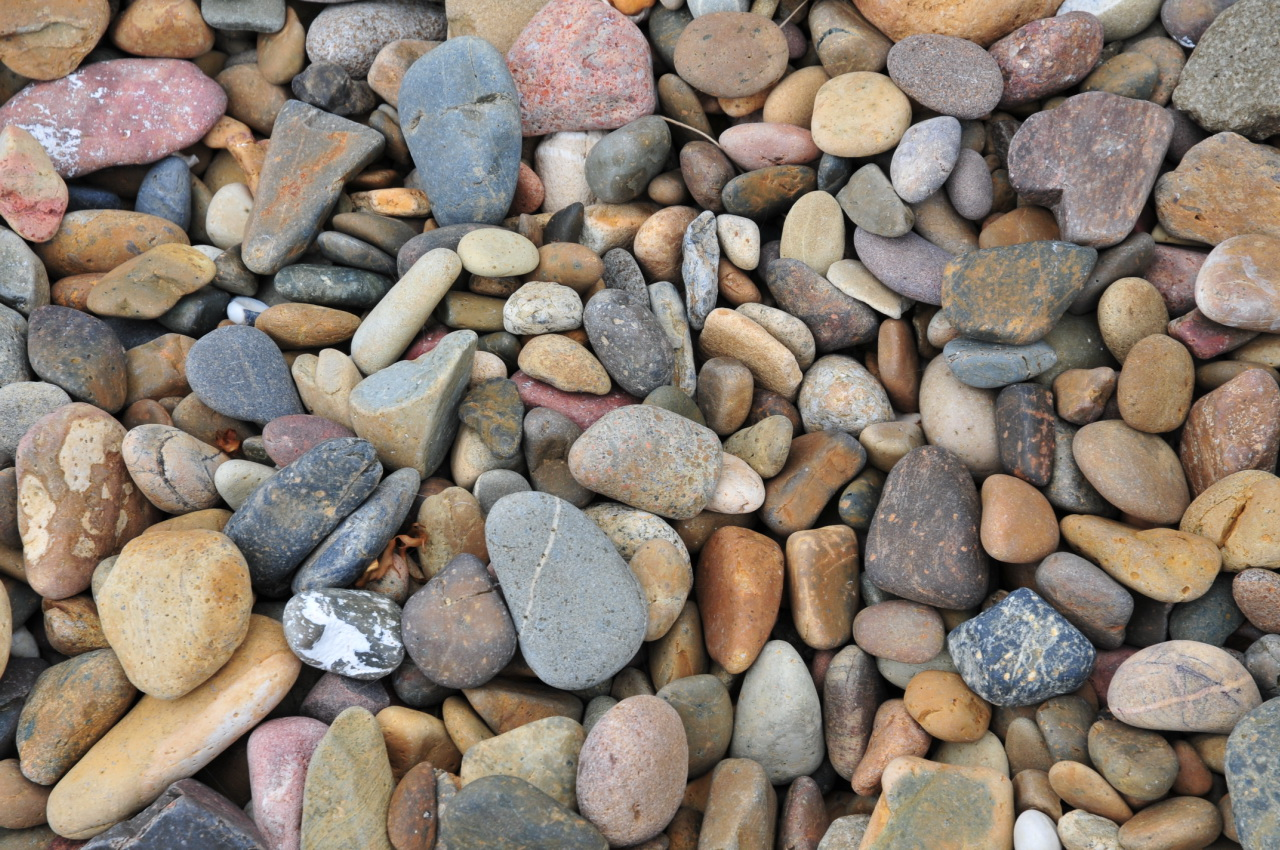
Pebbles on a beach at Broulee, Australia

== See also ==
- Gravel
- Japanese Garden of Peace
- Rock
- Floater
