= Bedrock =

Solid rock under loose surface material

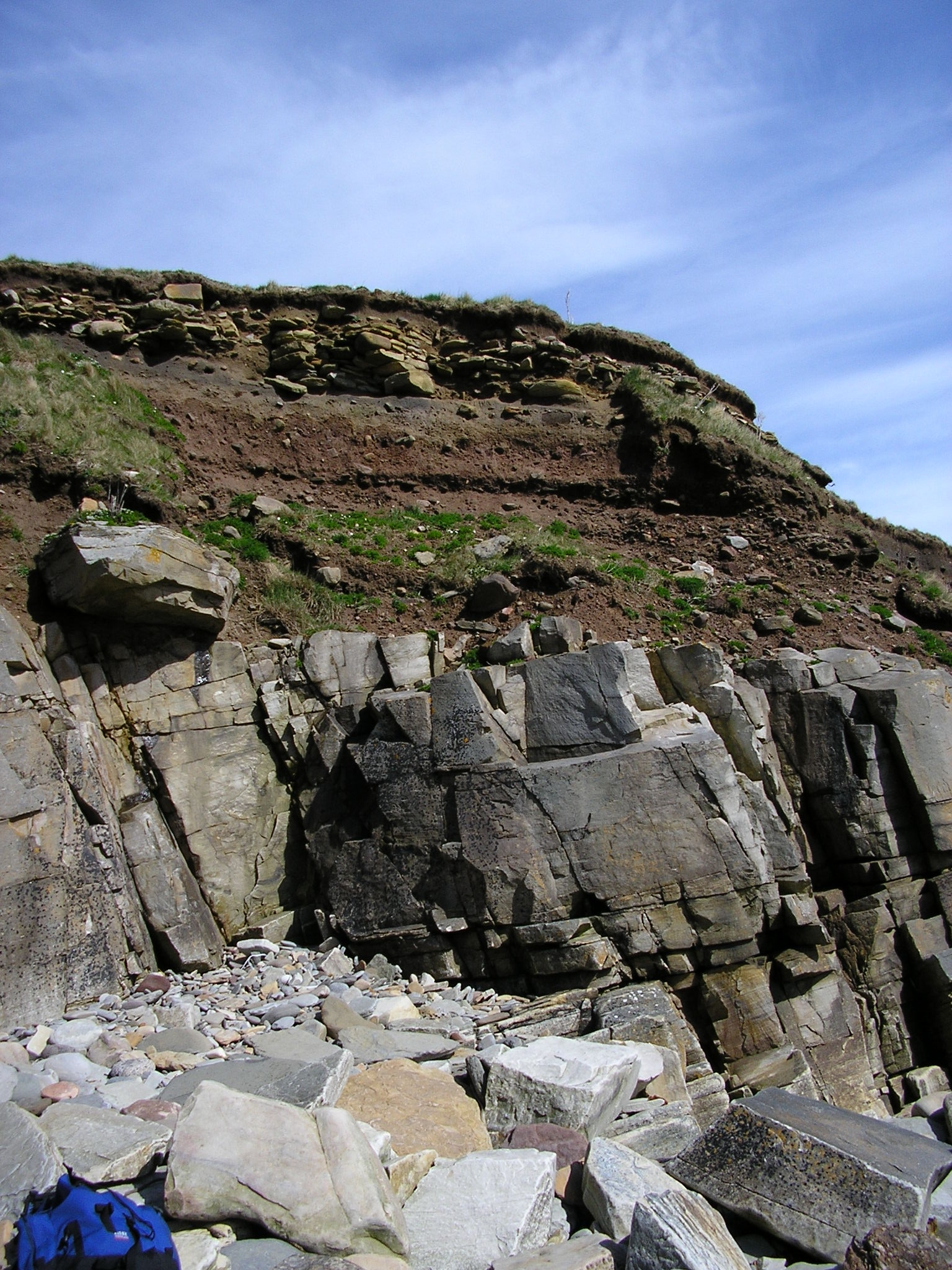
Soil with broken rock fragments overlying bedrock at Sandside Bay, Caithness, Scotland

Soil profile with bedrock labeled R

In geology, bedrock is the solid rock that lies under weathered rock and unconsolidated or loose superficial deposits (together known as regolith) in the near surface part of Earth's crust or the crust of another terrestrial planet. The top of the bedrock is known as rockhead.

== Definition ==
Bedrock is the solid rock that underlies looser surface material. An exposed portion of bedrock is often called an outcrop. The various kinds of broken and weathered rock material, such as soil and subsoil, that may overlie the bedrock are known as regolith. The area where bedrock and these overlying materials meet is called rockhead.

== Engineering geology ==
The surface of the bedrock beneath the soil cover (regolith) is also known as rockhead in engineering geology, and its identification by digging, drilling or geophysical methods is an important task in most civil engineering projects. Superficial deposits can be very thick, such that the bedrock lies hundreds of meters below the surface.

== Weathering of bedrock ==
Exposed bedrock experiences weathering, which may be physical or chemical, and which alters the structure of the rock to leave it susceptible to erosion. Bedrock may also experience subsurface weathering at its upper boundary, forming saprolite. Rock fragments can disconnect from the underlying bedrock, where they are found within a weathering or soil profile as floaters.

== Geological map ==
A geological map of an area will usually show the distribution of differing bedrock types, rock that would be exposed at the surface if all soil or other superficial deposits were removed. Where superficial deposits are so thick that the underlying bedrock cannot be reliably mapped, the superficial deposits will be mapped instead (for example, as alluvium).
