= Cook's Head Rock =

Coordinates: 46°12′05″S 170°04′50″E

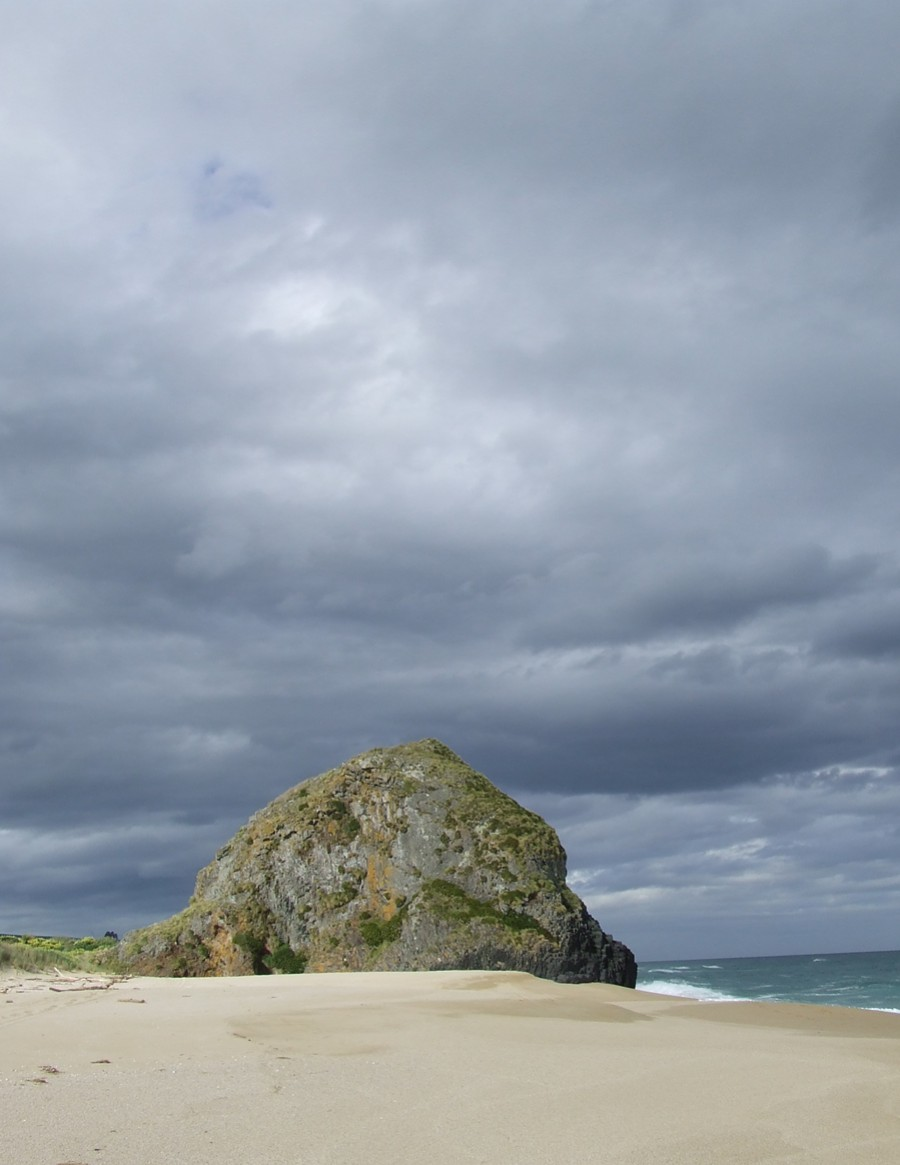
Cook's Head during late afternoon. Looking north towards Taieri Mouth and Dunedin.

Cook's Head Rock is a phonolite basalt rock standing on the Chrystall's Beach expanse closely north of the rivermouth settlement Toko Mouth of South Otago, New Zealand. The lower faces of the rock are made up of numerous hexagonal basalt columns suggesting Cook's Head Rock is a former volcanic vent.

== See also ==
- List of rock formations of New Zealand
