= Horeke basalts =

Rock formation in New Zealand

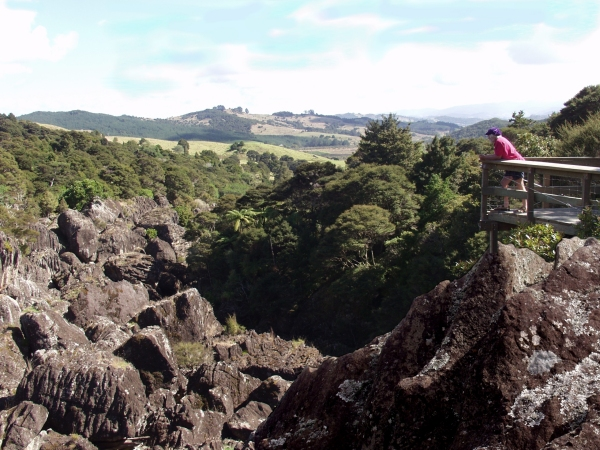
Wairere valley

The Horeke basalts is a disused formation that contained Miocene-Pliocene basalt lava flows that covered a large area in central Northland Region of New Zealand, and in places forms a high plateau around Okaihau.

Wairere Boulders is a nature park providing walkways through boulders of basalt, derived by erosion of one of these older basalt flows that used to be included in the Horeke Basalt and are now included in the Kerikeri Volcanic Group.

== Origin ==
The boulders in the Wairere valley are the erosional remnants of a lava flow out of a volcano near Lake Ōmāpere (near Kaikohe) that has been dated as approximately 2.8 million years old. There are two dates for these Horeke basalts: one at 2.84 and the other at 2.67 million years. There is a slight difference in chemistry in the two rocks that have been dated suggesting that the eruption took the form of several flows that once blanketed the high ground to the east of Horeke.

== Formation ==
Wairere valley formation

Erosion of the clay underlay of the basalt plateau (cap) started to create a v-valley. The edges of the cap broke off. These blocks travelled downwards along the hill sides towards the bottom of the valley, where they accumulated. They fill now a portion of the valley which is about 1.4 km long and up to 350 m wide.

== Surface erosion ==
Wairere boulders lapiez

Some of the channels discovered in the basalt are 1000 mm deep and up to 300 mm wide, which is highly unusual for basalts. It is the result of chemical leaching by acidic seepage from the humus on top of the boulders.
