= Tunnel Beach =

Beach in Dunedin, New Zealand

Coordinates: 45.921229°S 170.458556°E

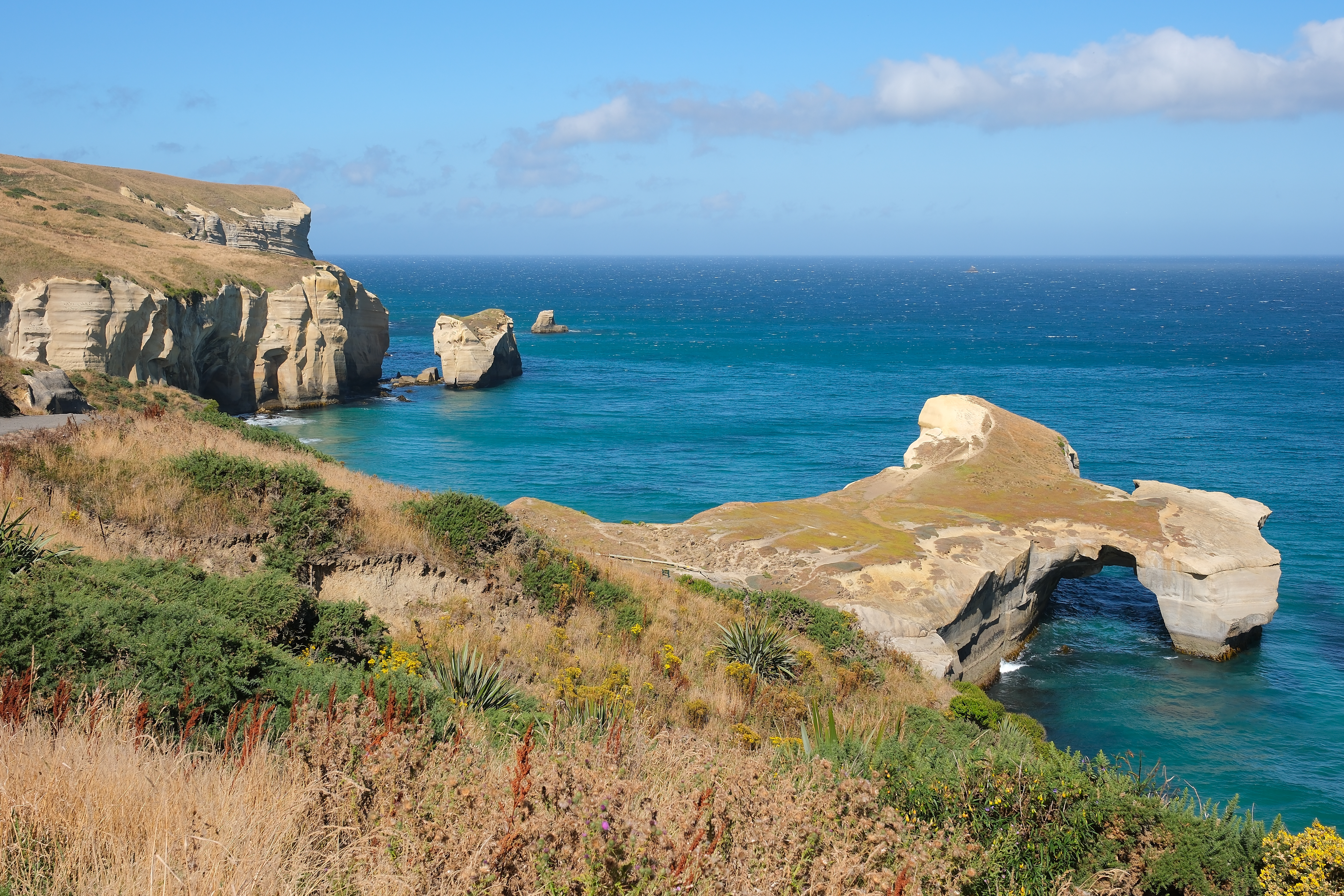
Tunnel beach (to the left of the rock arch) from top of walkway

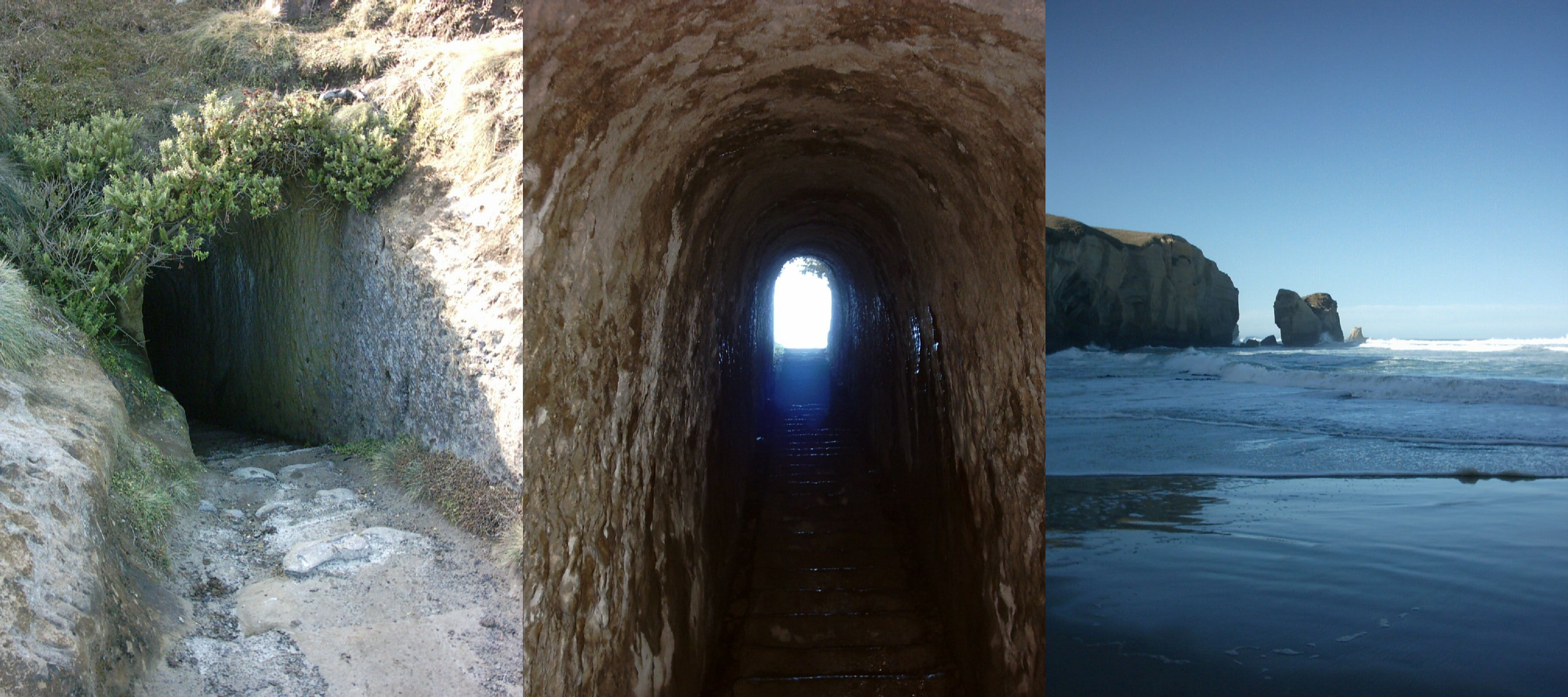
Collage showing the tunnel and the beach.

Tunnel Beach is a locality 7.5 kilometres (4.7 mi) southwest of the city centre of Dunedin, New Zealand. Located just south of St Clair, Tunnel Beach has sea-carved sandstone cliffs, rock arches and caves. The beach's claim to fame is the man-made tunnel dug by local politician John Cargill, son of Captain William Cargill, who had commissioned for his family in the 1870s. Urban legend states that one or more of Cargill's daughters drowned while swimming at the beach, but there is no truth to this story.

The tunnel itself is rough-hewn, and still shows the marks of the hand working which created it. Originally a simple slope, concrete steps were added when it was opened to the public in 1983.

Access to the beach is via the DOC Reserve, and is open year-round, excluding a flood in October 2024 which forced the beach to close until November 2025. The track is a popular walking excursion. It descends from 150 metres (490 ft) above sea level at its start, a short distance off Blackhead Road, winding for some 1200 metres to the top of the tunnel close to a natural sea arch. The tunnel descends 72 steps to the beach, and is dimly naturally lit. Note that the path down is steep and can be very slippery following wet weather.

== Safety ==
Swimming is not recommended at Tunnel Beach due to a rip that makes it dangerous. People have had to be rescued after getting into trouble on the track and in the water.
