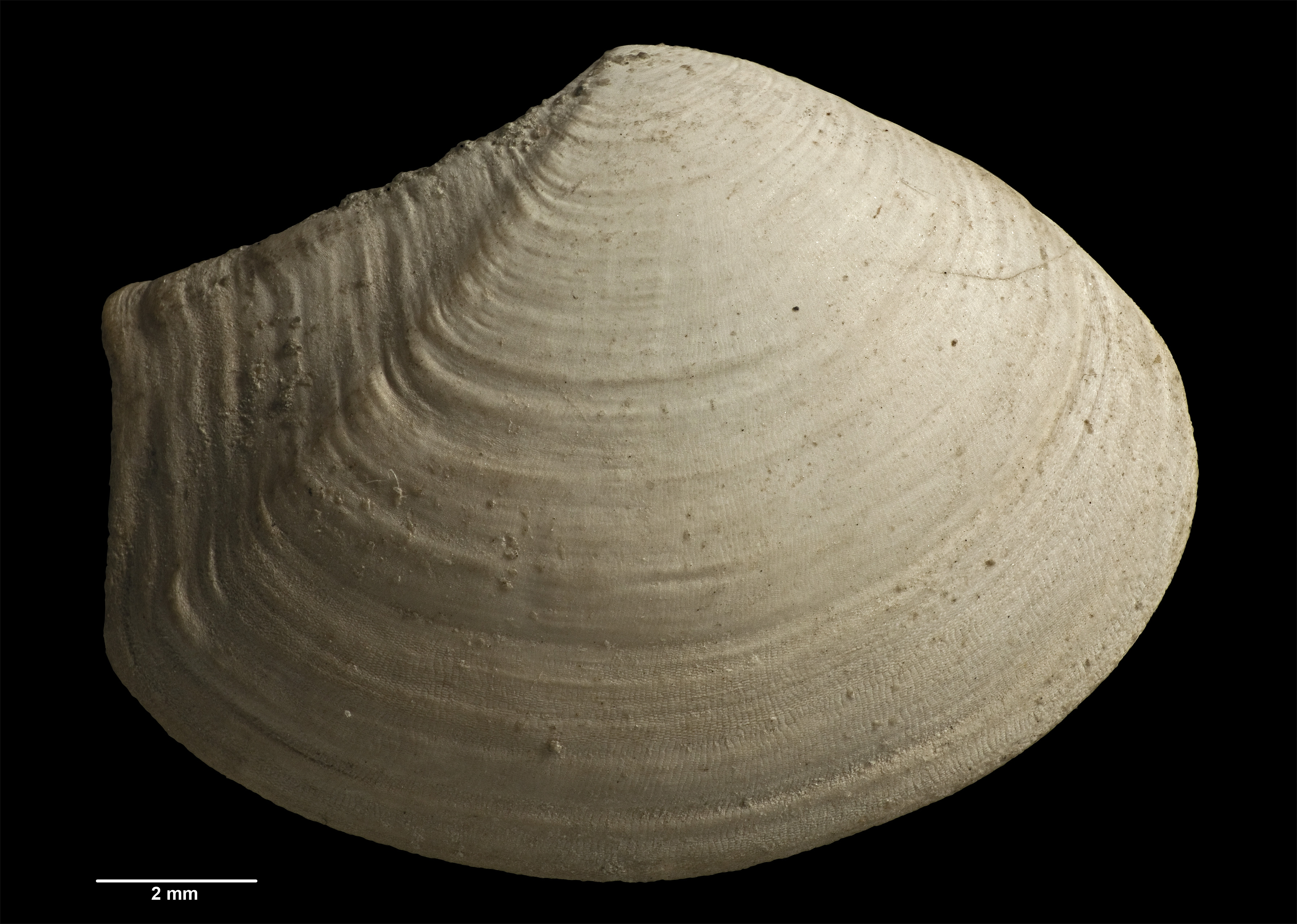
- Holotype from Auckland War Memorial Museum (right valve)

Scientific classification
- Kingdom: Animalia
- Phylum: Mollusca
- Class: Bivalvia
- Family: Myochamidae
- Genus: Myadora
- Species: M. kaiiwiensis

Binomial name
- Myadora kaiiwiensis A. W. B. Powell, 1931

= Myadora kaiiwiensis =

Myadora kaiiwiensis Temporal range: 1.63 Ma

Species of bivalve

Myadora kaiiwiensis is a species of bivalve, a marine mollusc in the family Myochamidae. Fossils of the species date to the Castlecliffian stage (1.63 million years ago) of the Early–Middle Pleistocene in New Zealand, and are only known from fossil deposits from the Wanganui Basin.

== Description ==
In the original description, Powell described the species as follows:

Shell of moderate size, transversely elongate-oval, posterior end broadly truncated. The convex right valve has a ridge running from the umbo to the lower extremity of the truncation, and this cuts off a shallowly-concave posterior area. Sculpture consisting of irregularly developed concentric ridges (about 22), which are subobsolete, except towards the margins and where they intersect the posterior ridge. Left valve almost flat, often very slightly convex. Posterior area marked off by a slight flattening. Sculpture of subobsolete flattened concentric ridges, very irregular in their development.

The holotype of the species has a height of 10.50 mm (0.413 in), a length of 13.75 mm (0.541 in), and a thickness of 2.90 mm (0.114 in).

M. kaiiwiensis can be differentiated from modern-day species M. boltoni and M. antipodum due to its smaller size and being less elongated. It has significantly weaker commarginal sculpture when compared to M. antipodum, and while its sculpture resembles M. boltoni, it is more ovate, differently proportioned, and has nearly central beaks and approximately equal ends.

== Taxonomy ==
The species was first described by A. W. B. Powell in 1931. The holotype was collected in January 1931 by Powell from 800 m (2,600 ft) northwest of the Kai Iwi Stream mouth near Kai Iwi in the Whanganui District. It is held in the collections of Auckland War Memorial Museum.

== Distribution ==
This extinct marine species occurs in the early Castlecliffian stage (1.63 million years ago) of the Early–Middle Pleistocene in New Zealand, with some fossils potentially dating back to the Nukumaruan stage (2.40 million years ago). Fossils of the species are only known from the Wanganui Basin of New Zealand, including the Wickham Formation.

== Gallery ==
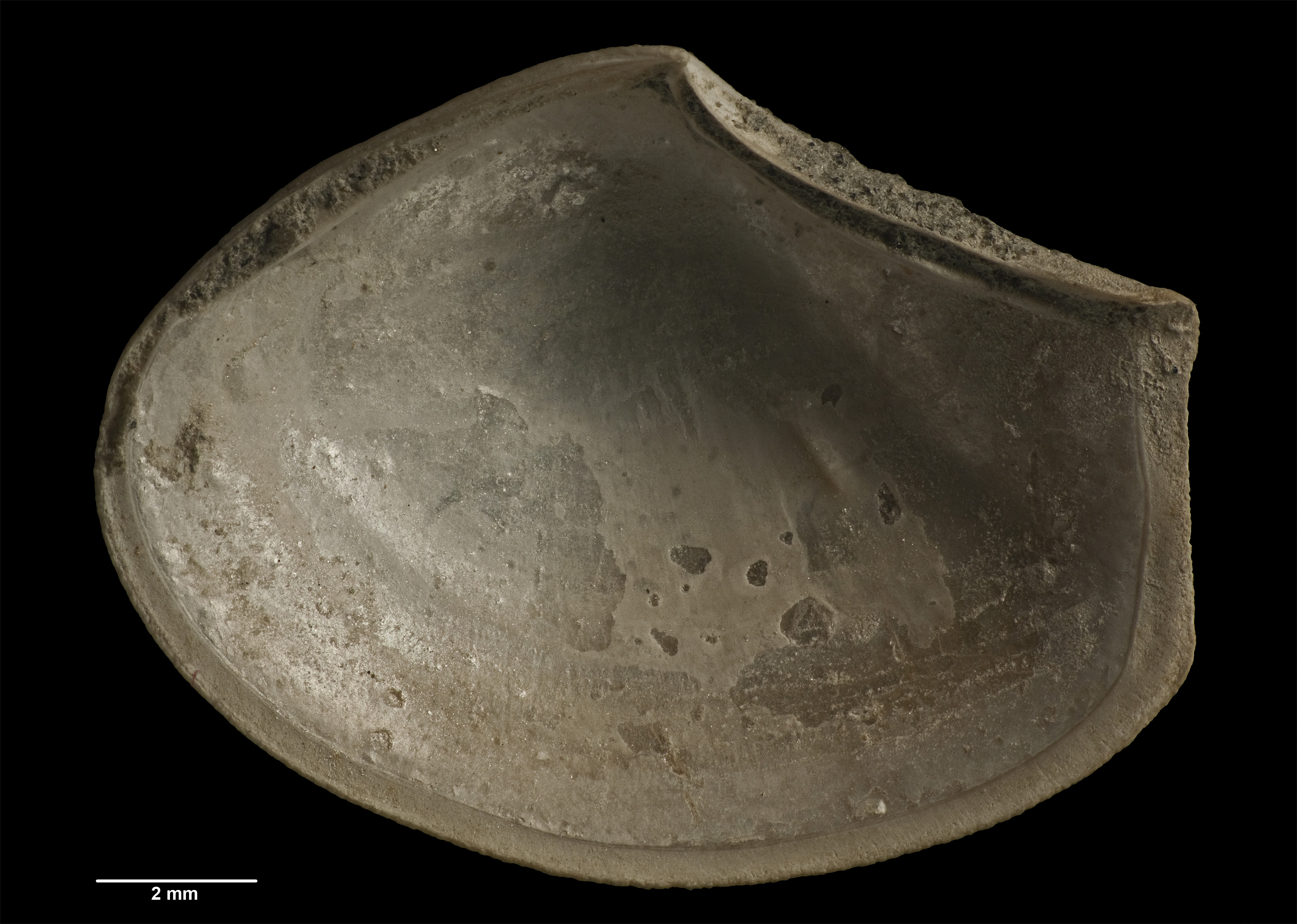
Holotype of M. kaiiwiensis (right valve underside)

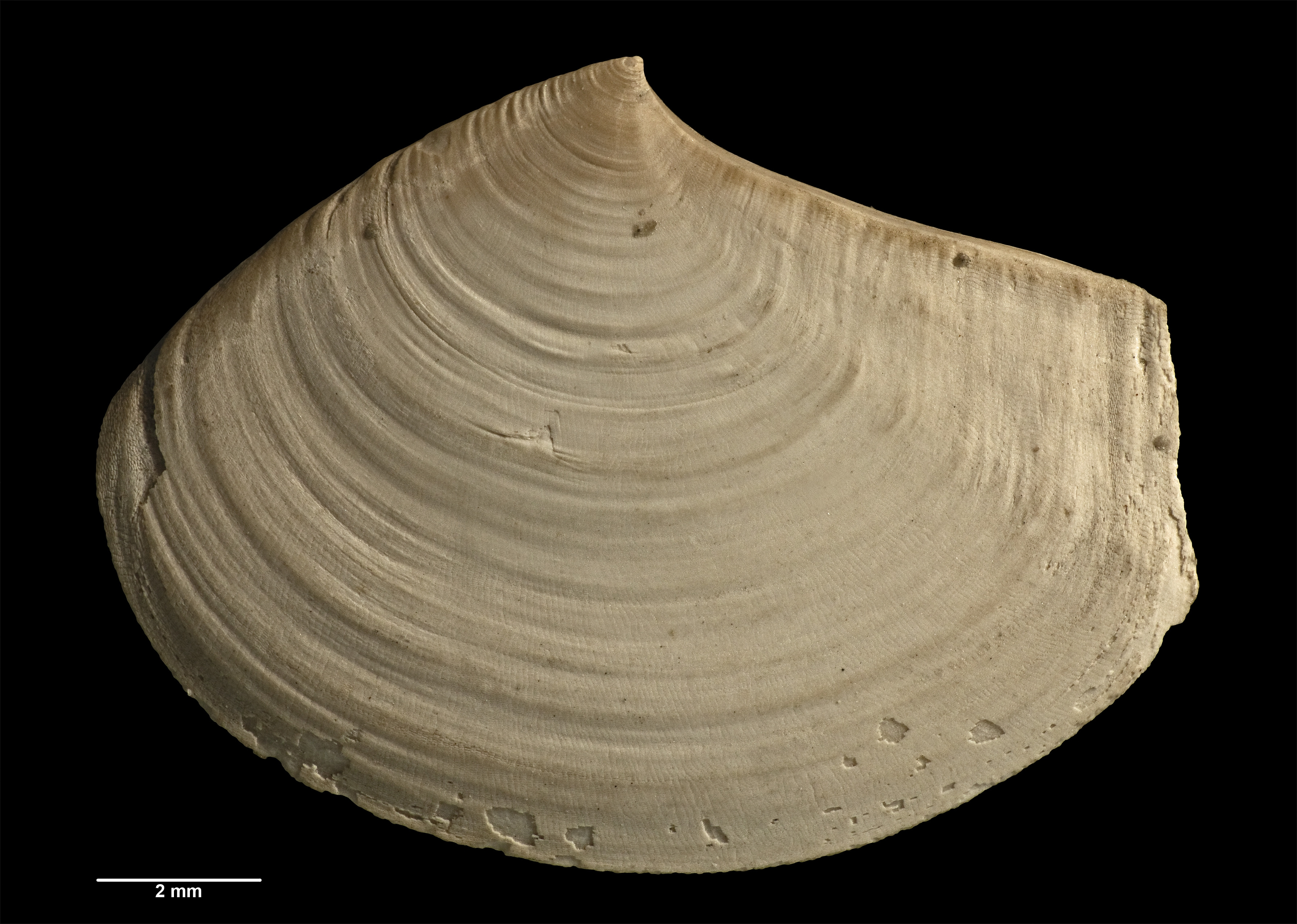
Holotype of M. kaiiwiensis (left valve top side)

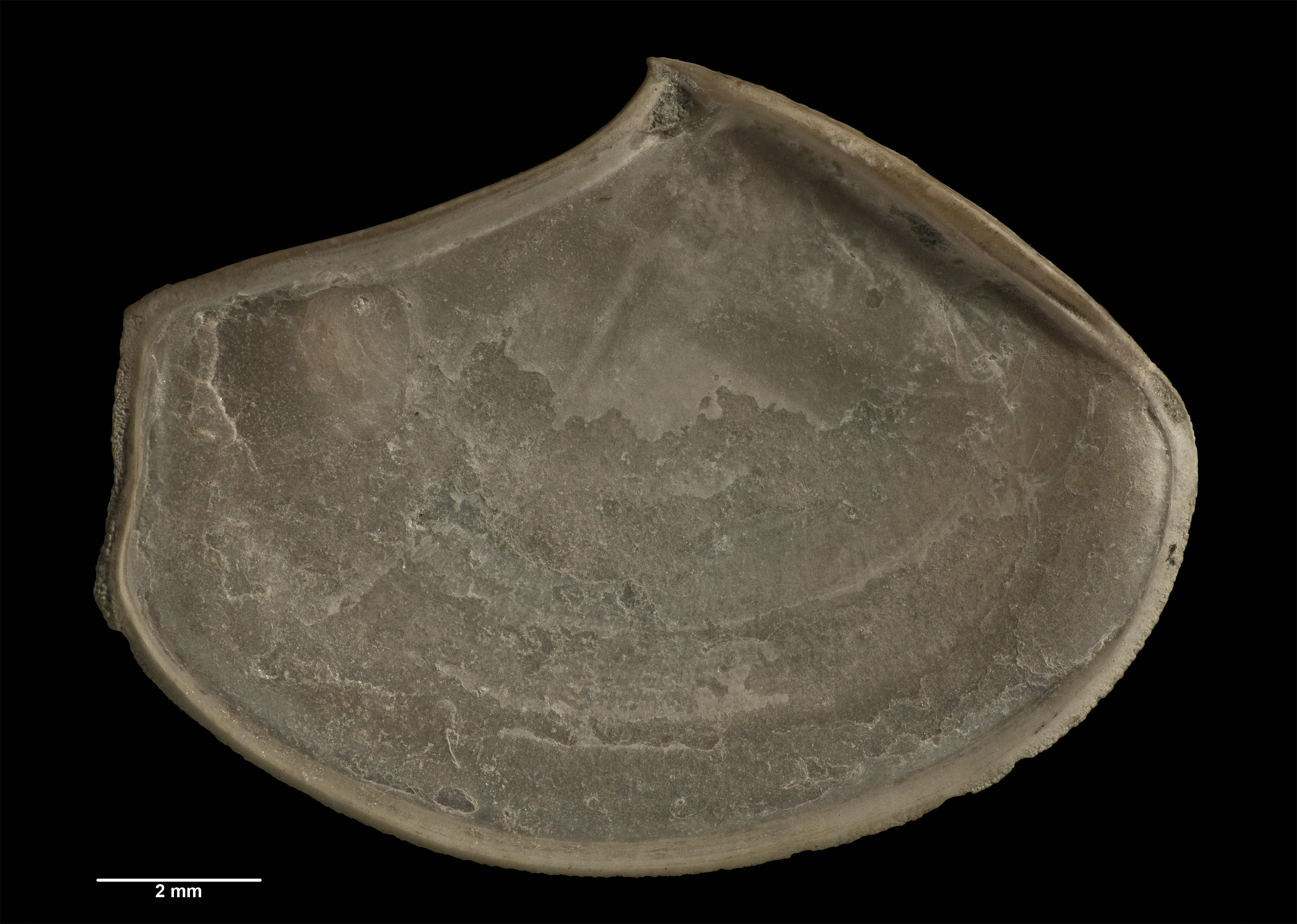
Holotype of M. kaiiwiensis (left valve underside)
