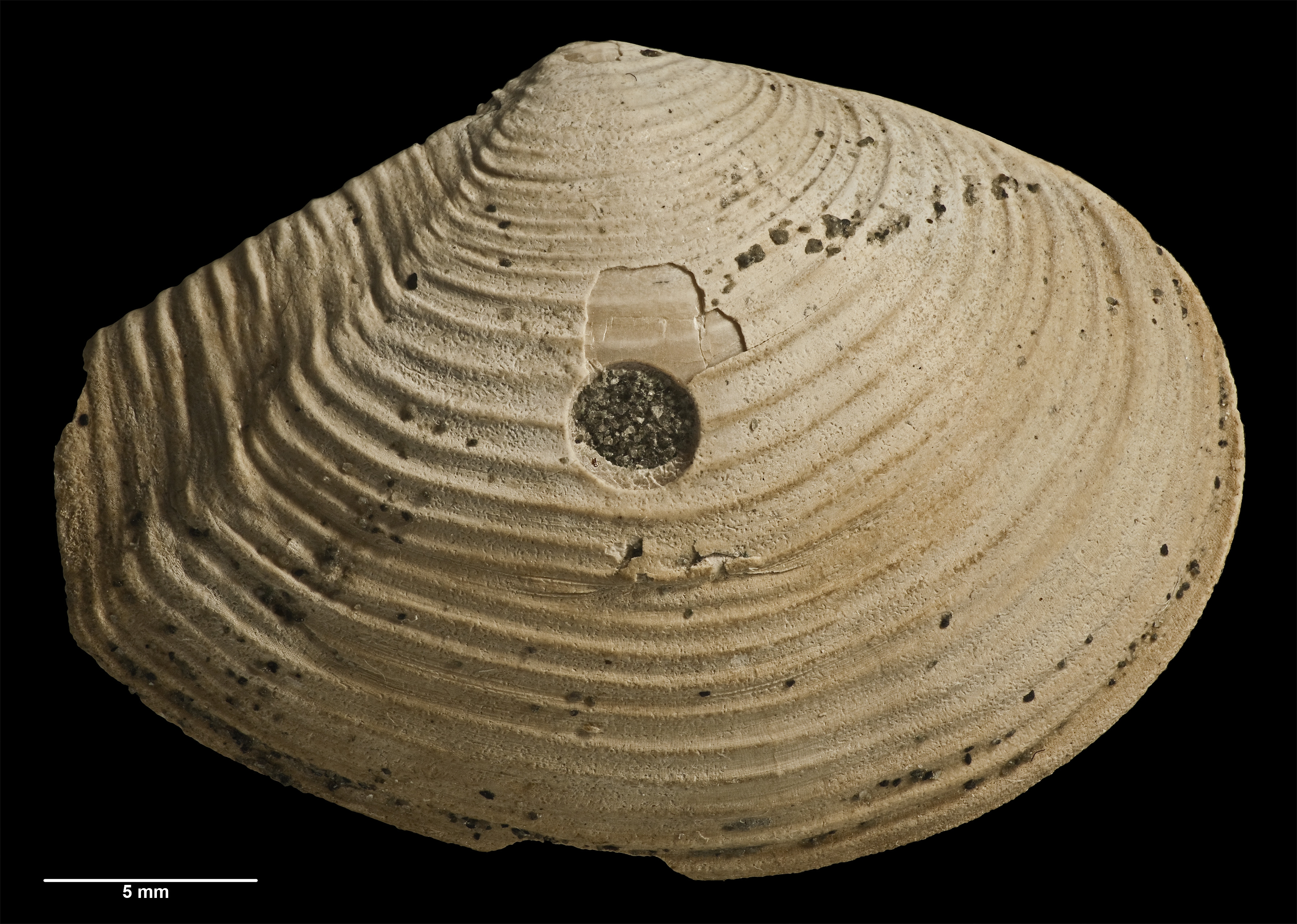
- Holotype from Auckland War Memorial Museum

Scientific classification
- Kingdom: Animalia
- Phylum: Mollusca
- Class: Bivalvia
- Family: Myochamidae
- Genus: Myadora
- Species: M. waitotarana

Binomial name
- Myadora waitotarana A. W. B. Powell, 1931

Synonyms
- Myadora stephaniae R. M. Carter, 1972; Myadora striata stephaniae R. M. Carter, 1972

= Myadora waitotarana =

Myadora waitotarana Temporal range: 5.33–2.40 Ma

Species of bivalve

Myadora waitotarana is a species of bivalve, a marine mollusc in the family Myochamidae. Fossils of the species date to late Pliocene strata in New Zealand, and represent the ancestral form of M. striata, a current day species endemic to New Zealand.

== Description ==
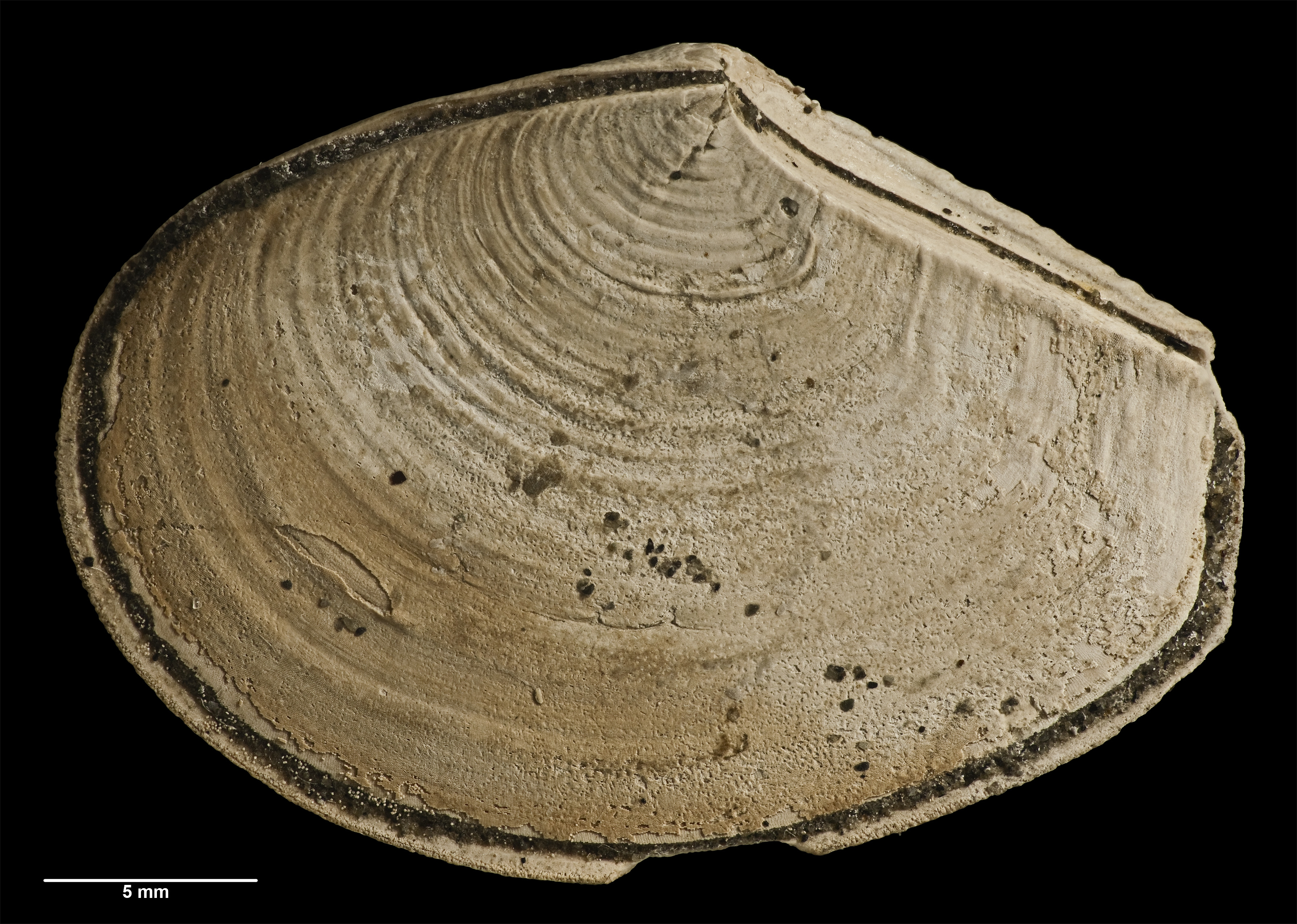
Underside view of holotype

Myadora waitotarana is moderately large for its genus, and has a low and elongated shell, with a weakly convex right valve and flat left valve. The anterior dorsal outline is highly convex. The right valve has two prominent ridges and a sculpture of narrow ridges, with minimal sculpture on the left valve, except near the anterior and posterior ends.

The species resembles M. antipodum morphologically in most aspects except for size; M. waitotarana being twice the size of M. antipodum. Young specimens of M. waitotarana which correspond in size can be identified due to not having a strongly convex shell. The species can be distinguished from modern M. striata by being longer, lower, and having prominent commerginal ridges. The holotype of the species has a length of 28 mm (1.1 in), a height of 20 mm (0.79 in), and a thickness of 6 mm (0.24 in).

== Taxonomy ==
The species was first described by A. W. B. Powell in 1931. The holotype was collected in January 1931 from the mouth of the Waihi Stream near Hāwera, South Taranaki, and is held in the collections of Auckland War Memorial Museum.

In 2006, A. G. Beu argued that M. striata developed from M. waitotarana through anagenetic evolution, and that the fossil taxon M. striata stephaniae (aka M. stephaniae) represented intermediate forms between M. waitotarana and M. striata, and synonymised this with M. waitotarana. The fossil species name was retained due to shape and size change compared to modern populations, which had stopped by the end of the Nukumaruan stage.

Powell in 1931 felt that the species was ancestral to the extant species M. antipodum, due to both species being morphologically similar in most aspects except for M. waitotarana being twice the size of M. antipodum, and argued that Lower Pliocene fossils from Kaawa Creek identified as M. antipodum by Bartrum and Powell in 1928 were immature examples of M. waitotarana. Later analysis of these and similar fossils indicated that many specimens were genuinely M. antipodum, indicating that both species lived at the same point in time.

== Ecology ==
The species is among those of the Eumarcia association, which preferred to live in strongly tidal shallow water environments close to the coast of New Zealand.

== Distribution ==
This extinct marine species occurs in late Pliocene strata (Opoitian, Waipipian, Mangapanian and Nukumaruan stages) in the Wanganui Basin, Wairarapa and Hawke's Bay in New Zealand, including the Tangahoe Formation.
