= Myadora novaezelandiae =

Scientific classification
- Kingdom: Animalia
- Phylum: Mollusca
- Class: Bivalvia
- Family: Myochamidae
- Genus: Myadora
- Species: M. novaezelandiae

Binomial name
- Myadora novaezelandiae E. A. Smith, 1881

Synonyms
- Myodora novaezealandiae E. A. Smith, 1881

Species of bivalve

Myadora novaezelandiae is a marine bivalve mollusc of the family Myochamidae. It is endemic to New Zealand.

== Description ==
The shell measures about 8×9 mm (0.31×0.35 in) in length and width. One valve is clearly convex whereas the other valve is slightly concave.
