= Myochama tasmanica =

Scientific classification
- Kingdom: Animalia
- Phylum: Mollusca
- Class: Bivalvia
- Family: Myochamidae
- Genus: Myochama
- Species: M. tasmanica

Binomial name
- Myochama tasmanica (Tenison Woods, 1877)

Synonyms
- Gouldia tasmanica Tenison Woods, 1877

Species of bivalve

Myochama tasmanica is a bivalve mollusc of the family Myochamidae. It occurs in the Great Australian Bight and off New Zealand.
