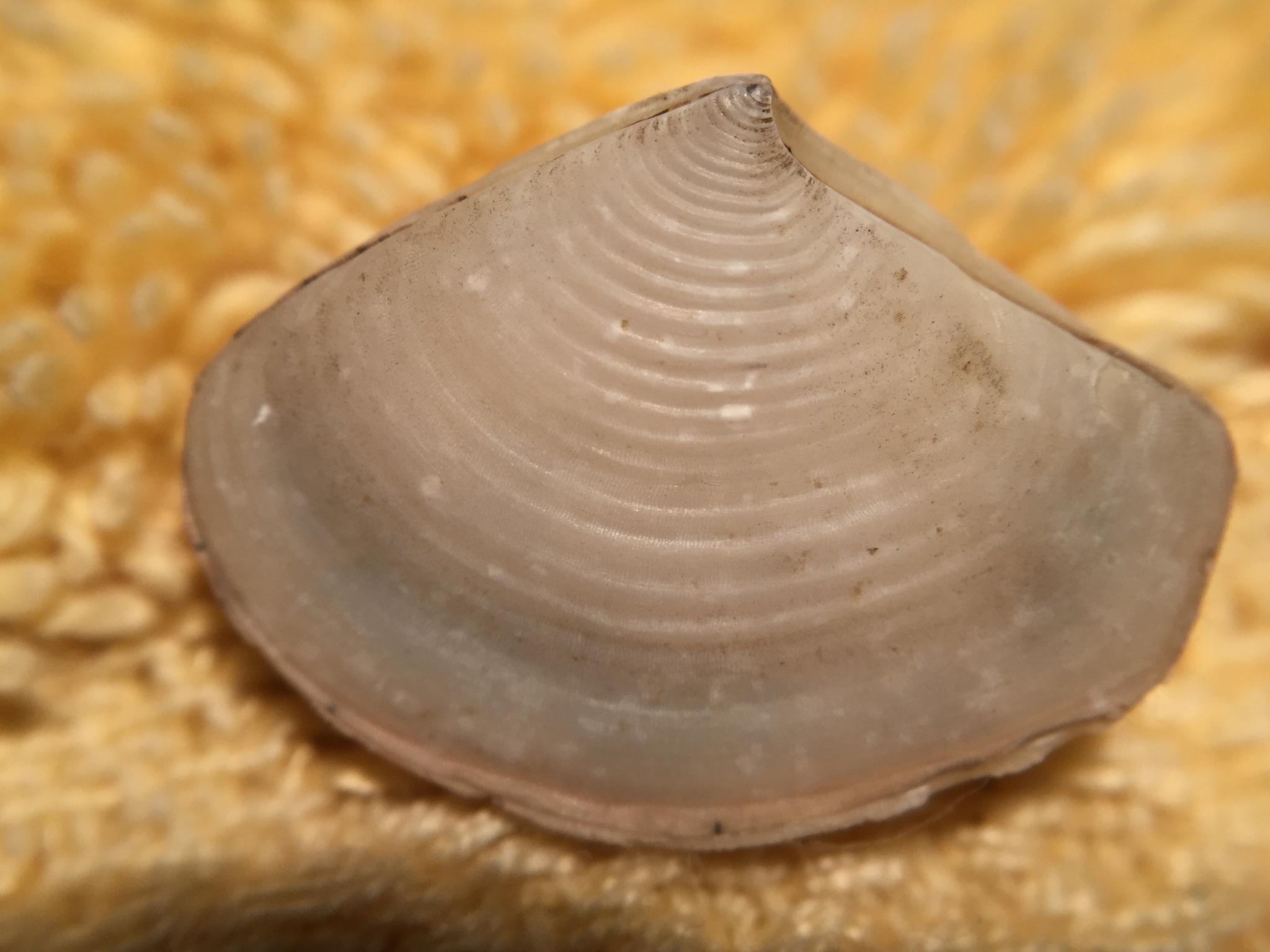

Scientific classification
- Kingdom: Animalia
- Phylum: Mollusca
- Class: Bivalvia
- Family: Myochamidae
- Genus: Myadora
- Species: M. subrostrata

Binomial name
- Myadora subrostrata E. A. Smith, 1881

Synonyms
- Myodora subrostrata E. A. Smith, 1881

= Myadora subrostrata =

Species of bivalve

Myadora subrostrata is a marine bivalve mollusc of the family Myochamidae. It is endemic to New Zealand.

== Description ==
The shell measures about 14×18 mm (0.55×0.71 in) by length and width. One valve is moderately convex whereas the other valve is flat.
