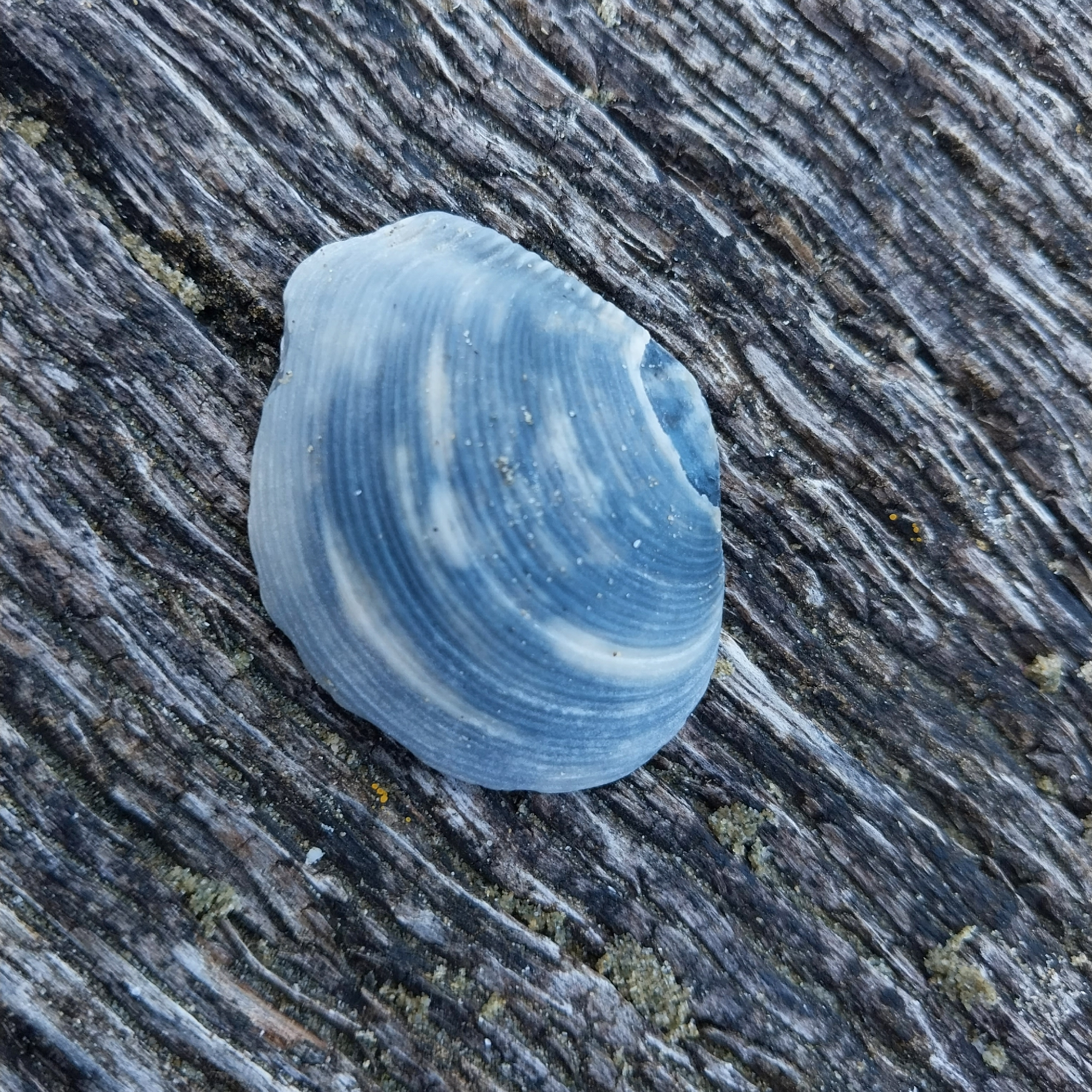

Scientific classification
- Kingdom: Animalia
- Phylum: Mollusca
- Class: Bivalvia
- Family: Myochamidae
- Genus: Myadora
- Species: M. striata

Binomial name
- Myadora striata (Quoy and Gaimard, 1835)

Synonyms
- Pandora striata Quoy & Gaimard, 1835

= Myadora striata =

Species of bivalve

Myadora striata is a species of marine bivalve mollusc in the family Myochamidae. It is endemic to New Zealand. It is common in the tidal zone of protected sandflats where it is found burrowing with its right, convex valve up. The left valve is flat. It is a large species within its genus.

== Taxonomy ==
The species developed from the late Pliocene fossil species Myadora waitotarana through anagenetic evolution.
