= Geology of the Raukumara region =

The Raukumara region of New Zealand corresponds to the East Cape of the North Island, and associated mountain ranges.

To the east of the North Island is the Hikurangi Trough, a collision zone between the Pacific Plate and the Australian Plate. The Pacific Plate is being subducted under the Australian Plate, compressing the east of the North Island, and causing the North Island Fault System, and a series of SSW-NNE trending basins and ranges, including the Raukumara Range. Successively newer rocks have been accreted to the east coast.

The Raukumara region used to be adjacent to Northland, before being shifted to its current position, and many rocks of the two regions match.

To the north of the Raukumara Range lies the Bay of Plenty, formed of Torlesse (Waioeka) Greywacke. The central ranges are covered by in-place and allochthonous (displaced) Cretaceous to Oligocene rocks. To the south are more recent, mainly Miocene and Pliocene, rocks.

== Basement rocks ==
All basement rocks beneath the Raukumara region belong to the Torlesse Composite (Waioeka) Terrane, of late Jurassic to early Cretaceous age (150-100 Ma). They are largely composed of Greywacke (hardened sandstone and mudstone), that accumulated in a deep marine environment. These rocks are exposed to the north of the Raukumara Range, from Whakatāne to Papatea Bay.

== In-place Cretaceous to Oligocene rocks ==
Sandstones and mudstones were deposited over the region in Cretaceous to Oligocene times (100-24 Ma). These rocks still cover the Raukumara Range.

== The East Coast allochthon ==
In Early Miocene times (24-21 Ma), when the Raukumara region was still adjacent to Northland, a series of thrust sheets was emplaced over much of the East Cape area. Large portions of the Cretaceous to Oligocene rocks have been displaced by tens to hundreds of kilometres, forming what is known as the East Cape Allochthon. The rocks came from the Northeast, and were emplaced in reverse order, but the right way up. The original rocks are of Cretaceous to Oligocene age (100-24 Ma), and include mudstones, limestone and basalt lava.

Most of the rocks east of the line from Papatea Bay to Waipiro Bay, and rocks just north of Whatatutu are allochthonous. Allochthonous rocks are assumed to underlie the more recent rocks to the south as well.

In the north, from Cape Runaway to Tokata, are allochthonous basaltic rocks, believed to represent sea floor, that has been obducted onto the land. These rocks correspond to the Tangihua rocks of Northland.

== Miocene and Pliocene rocks ==
During Miocene and Pliocene times, sandstone, mudstone, and some limestone was deposited over much of the southern area of the Raukumara region.

== Marine terraces ==
Marine terraces are common between Ōpōtiki and East Cape, and at Māhia Peninsula.

== Hot springs ==
Sinter deposits occur around the Te Puia Springs.

== Geological resources ==
The area to the south of the Raukumara region contains oil seeps (Waimata Valley and Waitangi Station), and is believed to have potential commercial gas and oil reserves. While the region has been explored, and minor reserves found, no major commercial reserves have yet been found.

== Geological hazards ==
The Raukumara region, and the Hikurangi Trough are prone to earthquakes, with the consequential risk of tsunami. For example, a magnitude 6.8 earthquake hit the Gisborne area on 20 December 2007. There were also two major tsunamis on 26 March 1947 and 17 May 1947.

Much of the land is composed of soft mudstones, that are easily eroded, particularly in areas without bush cover.

The region is also prone to flooding, when tropical cyclones manage to come sufficiently far south.

The region can also receive minor falls of volcanic ash from the Taupō Volcanic Zone.

== Geological sites worth visiting ==
- Drive the loop from Gisborne, through the Waioeka Gorge, looking at the greywacke, to Opotiki, then around East Cape, looking at the Matakaoa volcanics between Cape Runaway and Tokata (e.g., Haupara Point, near Hicks Bay), visiting East Cape itself, then back to Gisborne, though Miocene sandstones and mudstones.
- At Oponae, in the Waioeka Gorge 19 km from Opotiki, massive blocks of red, green and white chert containing radiolarians of Jurassic age are embedded in Cretaceous greywacke. The blocks protrude from road cuttings and form the narrow Hell's Gate Rapids on the river.
- Try white water rafting down the Mōtū River, or drive to the Mōtū Falls.
- Visit Waimata Valley (Y17/508894) and Waitangi Station (Y17/383016), north of Gisborne, to see the mud volcanoes and oil seeps. (Maybe these are difficult to find.)
- Have a hot swim at Te Puia Springs, and see the sinter deposits.

== Maps ==
Geological maps of New Zealand can be obtained from the New Zealand Institute of Geological and Nuclear Science (GNS Science), a New Zealand Government Research Institute.

The main maps are the 1 : 250 000 QMap series, which was completed as a series of 21 maps in 2010. Low resolution versions of these maps (without the associated booklet) can be downloaded from the GNS site. The map for the Raukumara Area was published in 2001.

Alternatively digital GIS layers are available using the free GNS map viewer.

== See also ==
- Geology of New Zealand
