= Geology of New Zealand =

New Zealand and New Caledonia represent the visible part of a portion of continental crust, usually referred to as Zealandia. The rest of Zealandia includes the Challenger Plateau and Lord Howe Rise, which stretch from Northwest of New Zealand almost to Northern Australia, and the Campbell Plateau and Chatham Rise, to the southeast of New Zealand.

The geology of New Zealand is noted for its volcanic activity, earthquakes and geothermal areas because of its position on the boundary of the Australian Plate and Pacific Plates. New Zealand is part of Zealandia, a microcontinent nearly half the size of Australia that broke away from the Gondwanan supercontinent about 83 million years ago. New Zealand's early separation from other landmasses and subsequent evolution have created a unique fossil record and modern ecology.

New Zealand's geology can be simplified into three phases. First the basement rocks of New Zealand formed. These rocks were once part of the super-continent of Gondwana, along with South America, Africa, Madagascar, India, Antarctica and Australia. The rocks that now form the mostly submerged continent of Zealandia were then nestled between Eastern Australia and Western Antarctica. Secondly New Zealand drifted away from Gondwana and many sedimentary basins formed, which later became the sedimentary rocks covering the geological basement. The final phase is represented by the uplift of the Southern Alps and the eruptions of the Taupō Volcanic Zone.

== Basement rocks (Cambrian-Cretaceous) ==
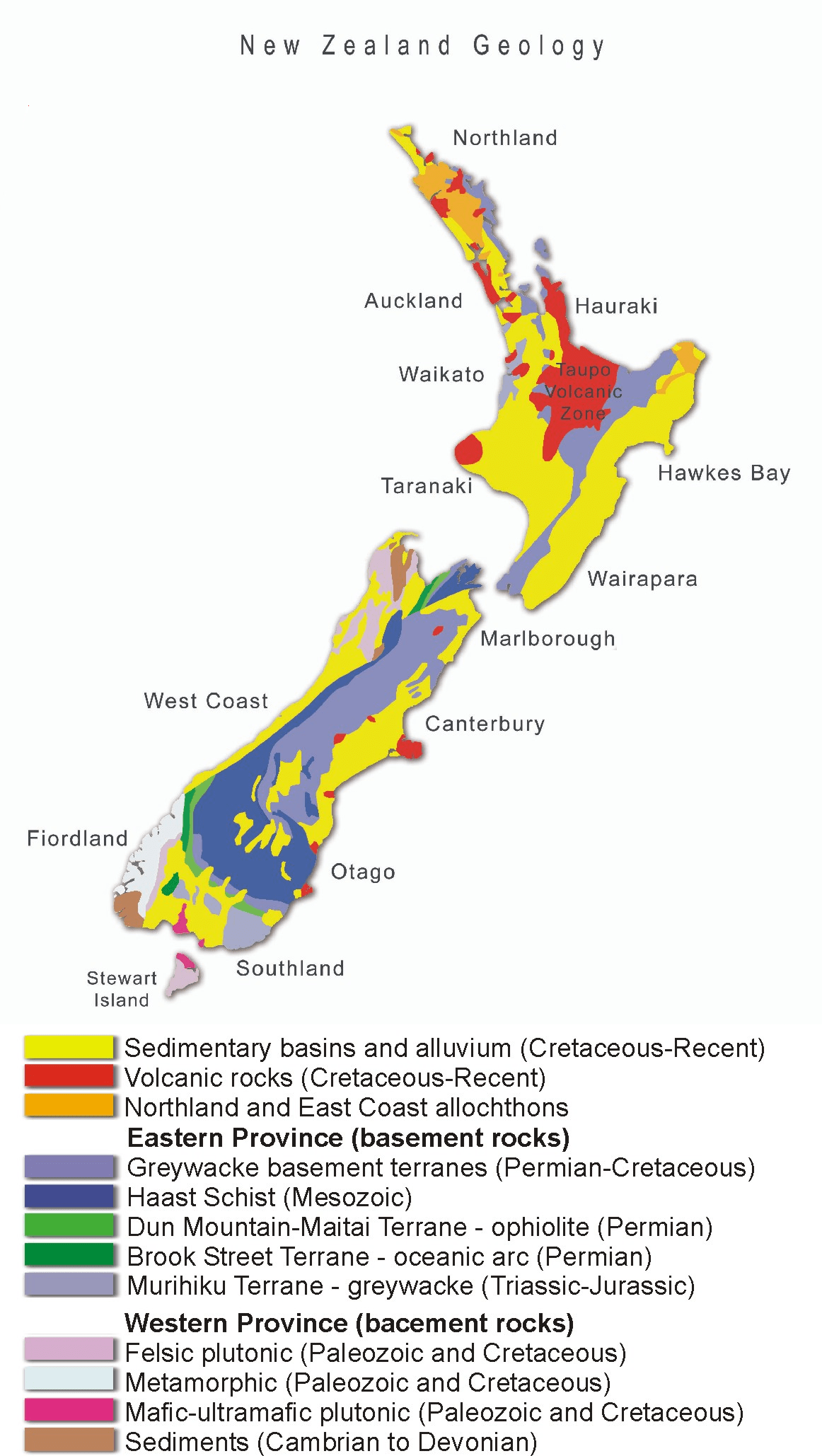
Basic geological regions of New Zealand Source: Institute of Geological and Nuclear Sciences, New Zealand

New Zealand's basement rocks range in age from mid-Cambrian in north-west Nelson to Cretaceous near Kaikōura. These rocks were formed in a marine environment before New Zealand separated from Gondwana. They are divided into the "Western Province", consisting mainly of greywacke, granite and gneiss, and an "Eastern Province", consisting mainly of greywacke and schist. The provinces are further divided into terranes – large slices of crust with different geological histories that have been brought together by tectonic activity (subduction and strike-slip faulting) to form New Zealand.

The Western Province is older than the Eastern Province and outcrops along the west coast of the South Island from Nelson to Fiordland. The Western Province is divided into the Buller and Takaka terranes which formed in mid-Cambrian to Devonian time (510–400 Ma). This includes New Zealand's oldest rocks, trilobite-containing greywacke, which are found in the Cobb Valley in north-west Nelson.

Large sections of the Western Province have been intruded by plutonic rocks or metamorphosed to gneiss. These plutonic basement rocks are subdivided into the Hohonu, Karamea, Median and Paparoa batholiths. These rocks form the foundations beneath offshore Taranaki, and much of the West Coast, Buller, north-west Nelson, Fiordland and Stewart Island / Rakiura. Most of these plutonic rocks were formed in Devonian-Carboniferous time (380–335 Ma) and Jurassic-Cretaceous time (155–100 Ma). The Median Batholith represents a long-lived batholith dividing the Western and Eastern Provinces. Before Zealandia's separation from Gondwana it stretched from Queensland, through what is now New Zealand, into West Antarctica. It marks the site of a former subduction zone on the edge of Gondwana.

The Eastern Province underlies more of New Zealand than the Western Province, including the greywacke and schist of the Southern Alps and all of the basement rocks of the North Island. The Eastern Province contains seven main terranes, the Drumduan, Brook Street, Murihiku, Dun Mountain–Maitai, Caples, Torlesse composite (Rakaia, Aspiring and Pahau terranes) and Waipapa composite (Morrinsville and Hunua terranes). They are mostly composed of greywacke together with argillite, except for the Brook Street and Dun Mountain–Maitai terranes which have significant igneous components (see Dun Mountain ophiolite belt). New Zealand's greywacke is mostly from the Caples, Torlesse composite (Rakaia and Pahau) and Waipapa composite (Morrinsville and Hunua) terranes formed in Carboniferous–Cretaceous time (330–120 Ma). Much of these rocks were deposited as submarine fans. They have different origins, as shown by different chemical compositions and different fossils. In general, the sedimentary basement terranes become younger from West to East across the country, as the newer terranes were scraped off the subducting paleo-Pacific plate, and accreted to the boundary of Gondwana over hundreds of millions of years.

Many rocks in the Eastern Province have been metamorphosed into the Haast Schist, due to exposure to high pressures and temperatures. Rocks grade continuously from greywacke (e.g., in Canterbury) to high-grade schist (e.g., around the Caples-Torlesse boundary in Otago and Marlborough, and Torlesse rocks just to the East of the Alpine Fault). The Alpine Fault that corresponds to the line of the Southern Alps has separated the basement rocks that used to be adjacent by about 480 km.

== Separation from Gondwana (Cretaceous–Eocene) ==
The Australia–New Zealand continental fragment of Gondwana split from the rest of Gondwana in the late Cretaceous time (95–90 Ma). Then around 83 Ma, Zealandia started to separate from Australia forming the Tasman Sea, initially separating from the south. By 75 Ma, Zealandia was essentially separate from Australia and Antarctica, although only shallow seas might have separated Zealandia and Australia in the north. Dinosaurs continued to live in New Zealand after it separated from Gondwana, as shown by sauropod footprints from 70 million years ago in Nelson. This meant that dinosaurs had about 20 million years to evolve unique New Zealand species. During the Cretaceous extension large normal faults formed throughout New Zealand, the Hawks Crag Breccia formed next to scarps and it has become New Zealand's best uranium mineral deposit.

Currently, New Zealand has no native snakes or land mammals (other than bats). Neither marsupials nor placental mammals evolved and reached Australia in time to be on New Zealand when it drifted away 85 million years ago. The evolution and dispersal of snakes is less certain, but there is no hard evidence of them being in Australia before the opening of the Tasman Sea. The multituberculates, another type of mammal which is now extinct, may have been in time to cross the land bridge to New Zealand.

The landmasses continued to separate until early Eocene times (53 Ma). The Tasman Sea, and part of Zealandia then locked together with Australia to form the Australian Plate (40 Ma), and a new plate boundary was created between the Australian Plate and Pacific Plate. Zealandia ended up at a pivot point between the Pacific and Australian Plates, with spreading in the south, and convergence in the north, where the Pacific Plate was subducted beneath the Australian Plate. A precursor to the Kermadec Arc was created. The convergent part of the plate boundary propagated through Zealandia from the north, eventually forming a proto-Alpine Fault in Miocene times (23 Ma). The various ridges and basins north of New Zealand relate to previous positions of the plate boundary.

== Sedimentary basins and allochthons (Cretaceous–recent) ==
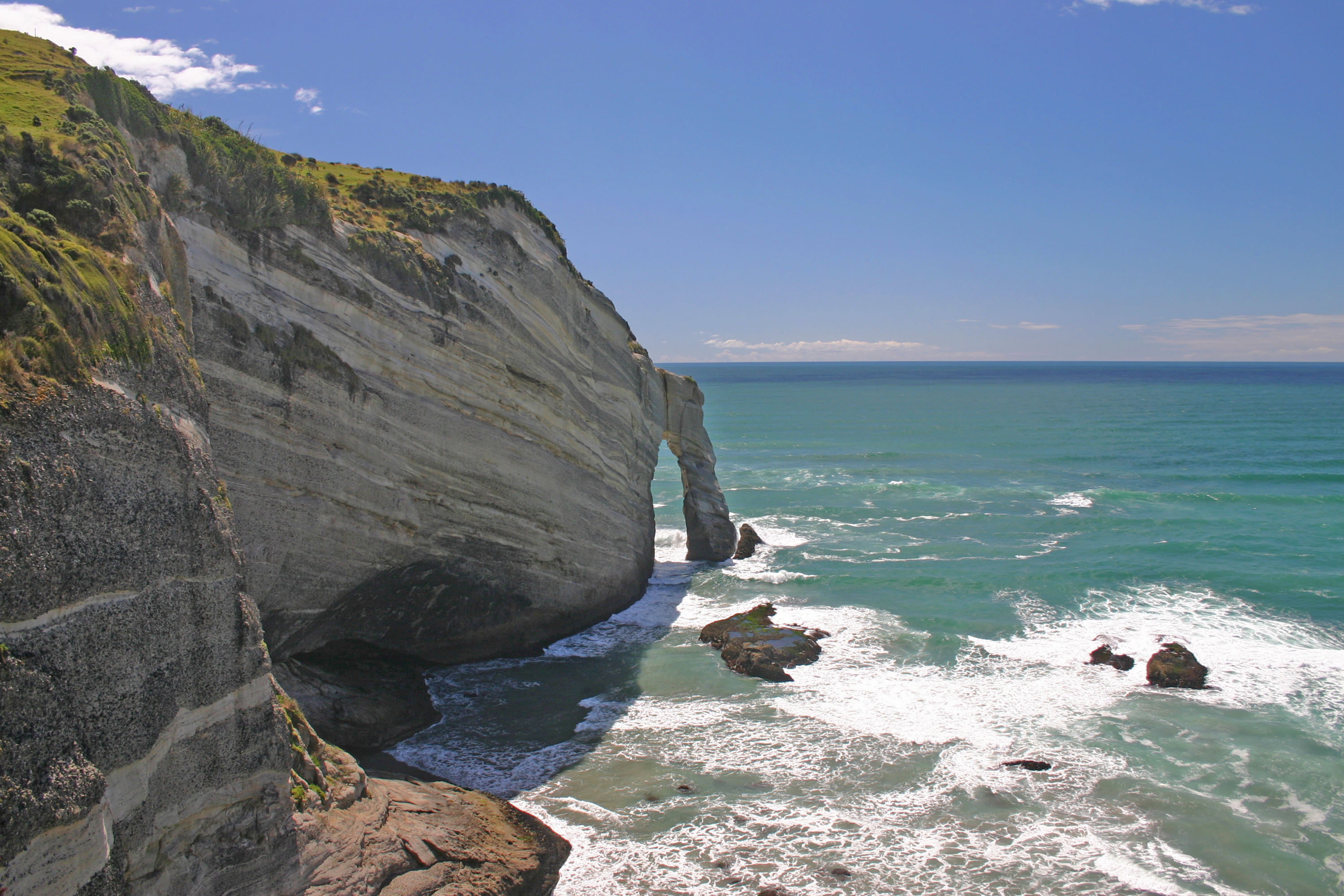
Sedimentary rocks from an uplifted basin – Cape Farewell, South Island

Erosion and deposition has led to much of Zealandia now being covered in sedimentary rocks that formed in swamps and marine sedimentary basins. Much of New Zealand was low lying around Mid Eocene–Oligocene times (40–23 Ma). Swamps became widespread, forming coal. The land subsided further, and marine organisms produced limestone deposits. Limestone of Oligocene–Early Miocene age formed in many areas, including the King Country, known for the Waitomo Glowworm Cave. In the South Island, limestone is present in Buller, Nelson, and the West Coast, including the Pancake Rocks at Punakaiki in Oligocene–Early Miocene times (34–15 Ma). It is debated whether all of New Zealand was submerged at this time or if small islands remained as "arks" preserving fauna and flora.

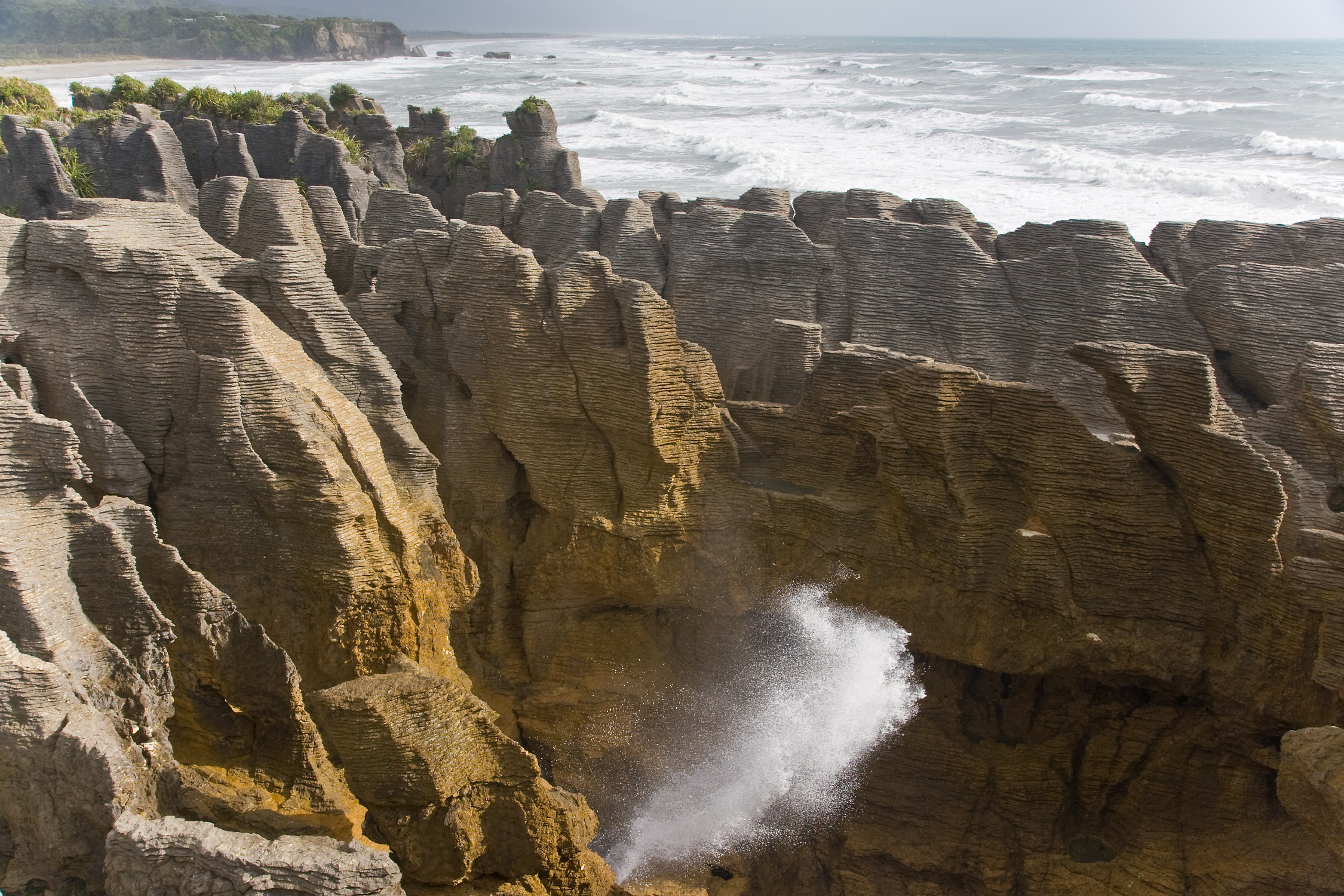
The Pancake Rocks at Punakaiki have irregular chasms and ridges, typical of limestone country.

An allochthon is land that formed elsewhere and slid on top of other land (in other words, the material of an enormous landslide). Much of the land of Northland and East Cape were created in this manner. Around 25–22 Ma, Northland and East Cape were adjacent, with East Cape near Whangārei. Northland–East Cape was an undersea basin. Much of the land that now forms Northland–East Cape was higher land to the northeast (composed of rocks formed 90–25 Ma). The Pacific-Australian plate boundary was further to the northeast, with the Pacific Plate subducting under the Australian Plate. Layers of rocks were peeled off the higher land, from the top down, and slid southwest under the influence of gravity, to be stacked the right way up, but in reverse order. Most of the material to slide were sedimentary rocks, however, the last rocks to be slid across were slabs of oceanic crust (ophiolites), mainly basalt. Widespread volcanic activity also occurred (23–15 Ma), and is intermixed with the foreign rocks. Sedimentary basins formed on the allochthons while they were moving. East Cape was later separated from Northland and moved further south and east to its present position.

== Volcanic activity ==
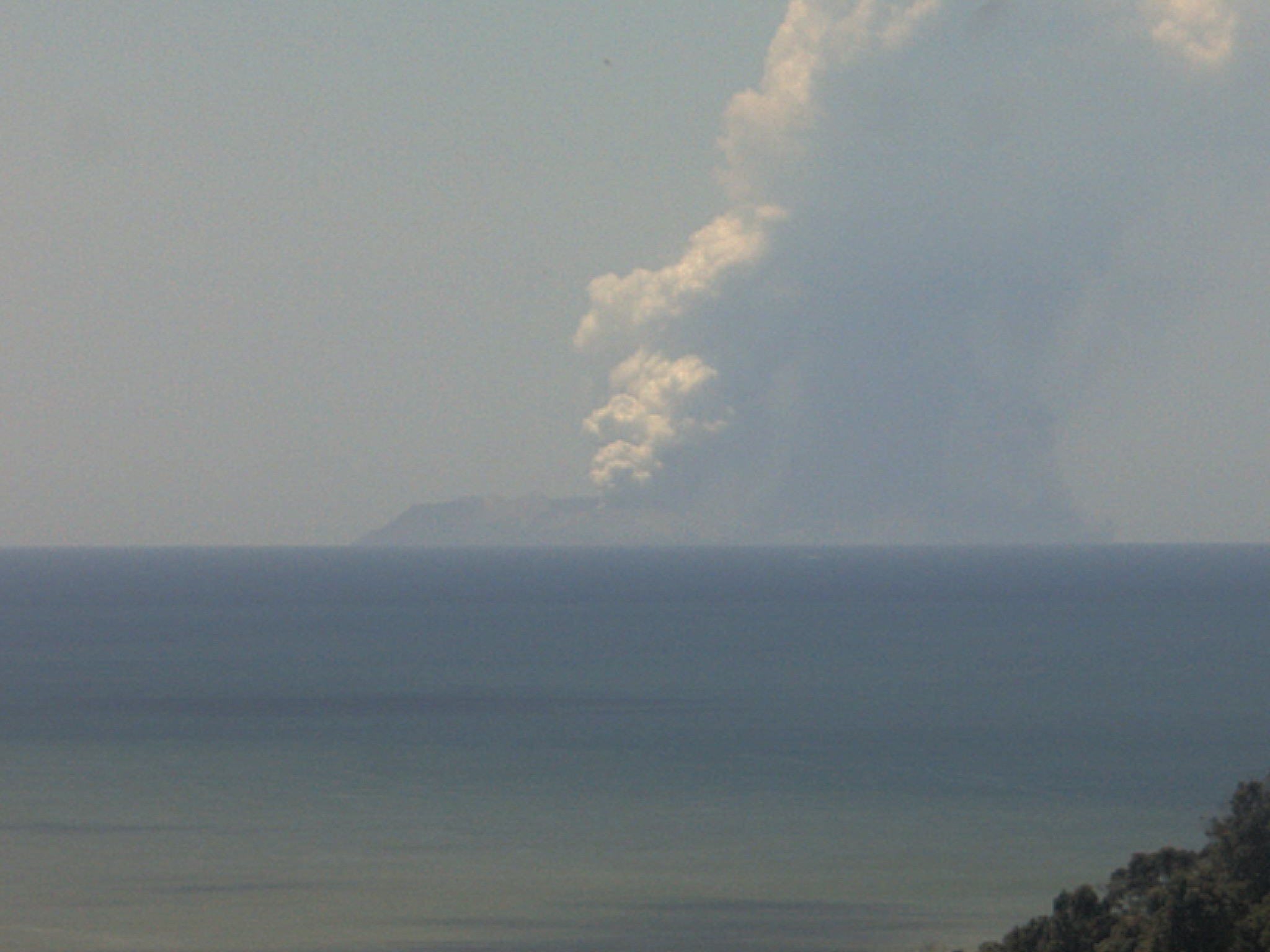
Whakaari / White Island eruption, 9 December 2019

Volcanism is recorded in New Zealand throughout its whole geological history. Most volcanism in New Zealand, both modern and ancient, has been caused by the subduction of one tectonic plate under another; this causes melting in the mantle, the layer of the Earth below the crust. This produces a volcanic arc, composed of mainly basalt, andesite and rhyolite. Basaltic eruptions tend to be fairly placid, producing scoria cones and lava flows, such as the volcanic cones in the Auckland volcanic field, although Mount Tarawera's violent 1886 eruption was an exception. Andesitic eruptions tend to form steep stratovolcanoes, including mountains such as Ruapehu, Tongariro and Taranaki, islands such as Little Barrier, Whakaari / White and Raoul Islands, or submarine seamounts like Monowai Seamount. Rhyolitic eruptions with large amounts of water tend to cause violent eruptions, producing calderas, such as Lake Taupō and Lake Rotorua. New Zealand also has many volcanoes which are not clearly related to present plate subduction including the extinct Dunedin Volcano and Banks Peninsula, and the dormant Auckland volcanic field.

=== Extinct volcanoes ===
The South Island has no currently active volcanoes. However, in the late Cretaceous (100–65 Ma), there was widespread volcanic activity in Marlborough, West Coast, Canterbury and Otago which contributes to landforms such as Mount Somers. In Eocene times (40 Ma), there was volcanic field activity near present day Oamaru. The most well known Miocene volcanic centres are the intra-plate Dunedin Volcano and Banks Peninsulas. The Dunedin Volcano which later eroded to form Otago Peninsula near Dunedin was built up by a series of mainly basaltic intra-plate volcanic eruptions in Miocene times (16–10 Ma). Banks Peninsula near Christchurch was built from two mainly basaltic intra-plate volcanoes in Miocene times (12–6 Ma and 9.5–7.5 Ma), corresponding to the Lyttelton / Whakaraupo and Akaroa Harbours. Southland's Solander Islands / Hautere were active as recently as 150,000 years old. There are also minor volcanics from a similar time period throughout Canterbury, Otago and also on the Chatham Islands.

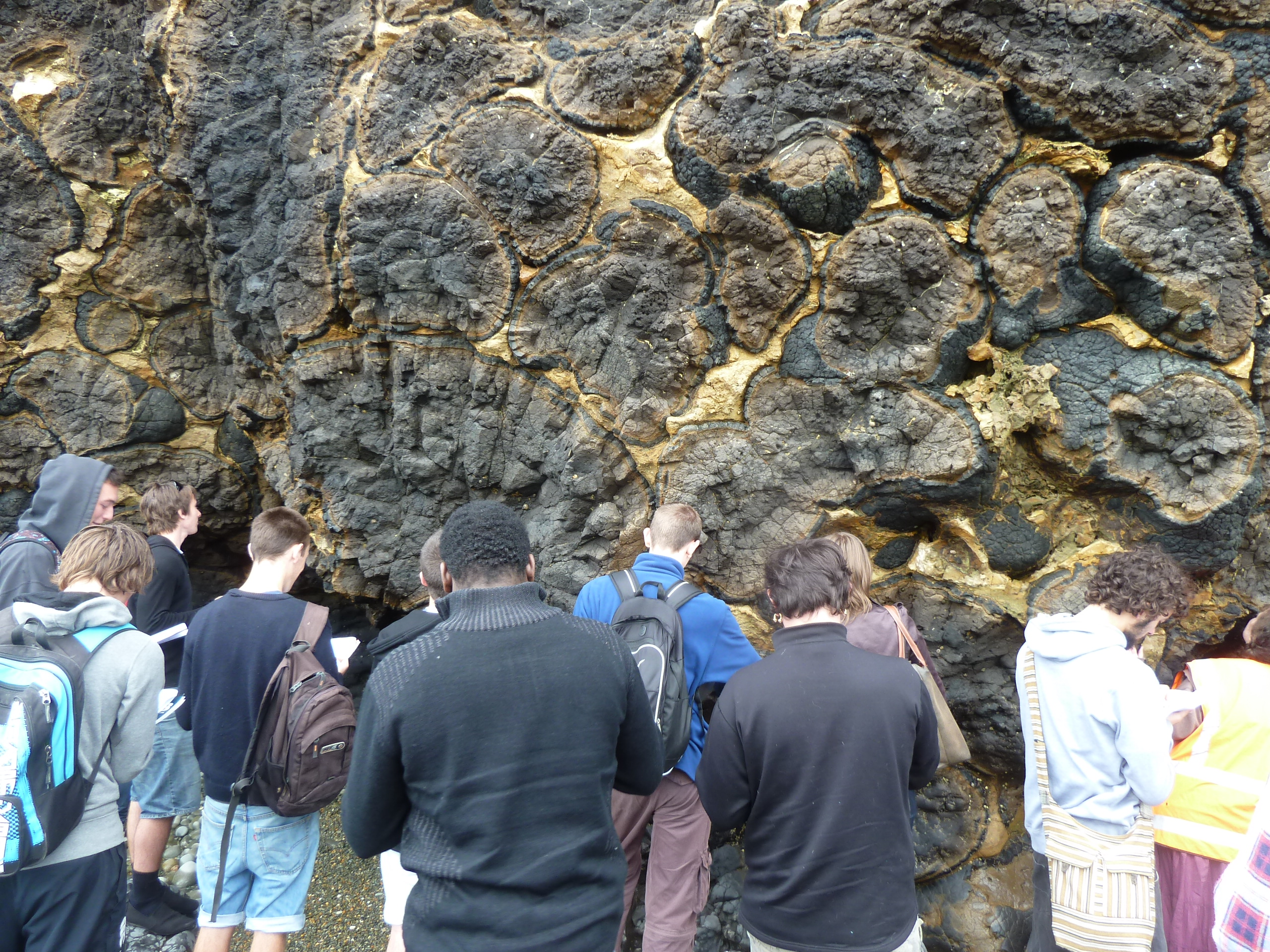
Ancient underwater volcanic eruptions (pillow lava) near Oamaru.

Intra-plate basaltic volcanic eruptions also occurred in the North Island, near the Bay of Islands in Northland, in the Late Miocene (10 Ma), and again more recently (0.5 Ma). The South Auckland volcanic field was active in Pleistocene times (1.5–0.5 Ma). The Auckland volcanic field started erupting around 250,000 years ago. It includes around 50 distinct eruptions, with most of the prominent cones formed in the last 30,000 years, and the most recent eruption, which formed Rangitoto Island, around 600 years ago. The field is currently dormant and further eruptions are expected. Over time the volcanic field has slowly been drifting northwards.

Volcanism in the North Island has been dominated by a series of volcanic arcs which have evolved into the still active Taupō Volcanic Zone. Over time, volcanic activity has moved south and east, as the plate boundary moved eastward. This started in Miocene times (23 Ma) when a volcanic arc became active to the west of Northland, and gradually moved South down to New Plymouth, where Taranaki is still active. It produced mainly andesitic strato-volcanoes. The Northland volcanoes include the volcanoes that produced the Waipoua Plateau (site of the Waipoua Forest) and the Kaipara Volcano. The Waitakere Volcano (22–16 Ma) has mainly been eroded, but conglomerate from the volcano forms the Waitākere Ranges, and produced most of the material that makes up the Waitemata sandstones and mudstones. Lahars produced the coarser Parnell Grit. Notable visible volcanoes in the Waikato include Karioi and Pirongia (2.5 Ma). The volcanoes off the West coast of the North Island, together with Taranaki and the Tongariro Volcanic Centre, are responsible for the black iron sand on many of the beaches between Taranaki and Auckland.

Shortly after (18 Ma), a volcanic arc developed further east to create the Coromandel Ranges and undersea Colville Ridge. The initial activity was andesitic but later became rhyolitic (12 Ma). In the Kauaeranga Valley, volcanic plugs remain, as does a lava lake that now forms the top of Table Mountain. Active geothermal systems, similar to those that now exist near Rotorua, were present around 6 Ma, and produced the gold and silver deposits that were later mined in the Coromandel gold rush. Later (5–2 Ma), volcanic activity moved further south to form the Kaimai Range.

=== Active volcanoes and geothermal areas ===
After this, activity shifted further East to the Taupō Volcanic Zone, which runs from the Tongariro Volcanic Centre (Ruapehu and Tongariro), through Taupō, Rotorua, and out to sea to form the Kermadec Ridge. Activity was initiated around 2 Ma, and continues to this day. The Tongariro Volcanic Centre is composed of andesitic volcanoes, while the areas around Taupō and Rotorua are largely rhyolitic with minor basalt. Early eruptions between Taupō and Rotorua around 1.25 Ma, and 1 Ma, were large enough to produce an ignimbrite sheet that reached Auckland, Napier, and Gisborne. This includes vast pumice deposits generated from eruptions in the Taupō Volcanic Zone occur throughout the central North Island, Bay of Plenty, Waikato, King Country and Manawatū-Whanganui regions. Every so often, there are swarms of earthquakes within an area of the Taupō Volcanic Zone, which last for years. These earthquake swarms indicate that some movement of magma is occurring below the surface. While they have not resulted in an eruption in recent times, there is always the potential for a new volcano to be created, or a dormant volcano to come to life.

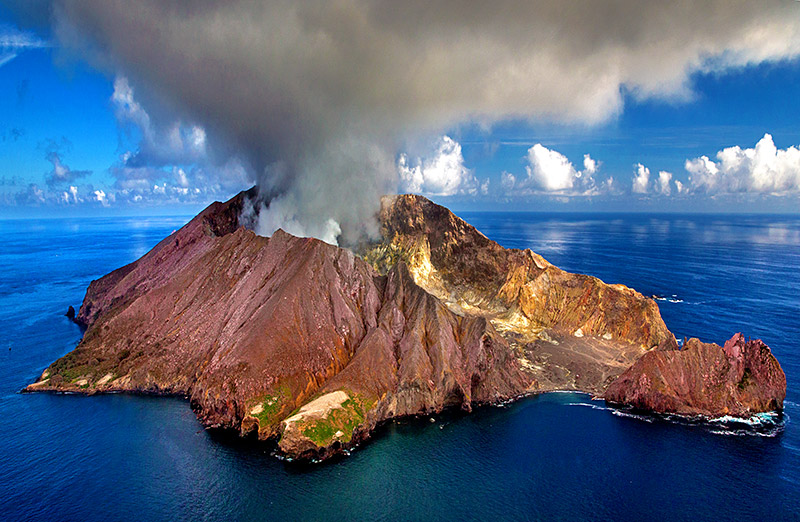
Eruption of Whakaari / White Island, New Zealand's most active volcano, Bay of Plenty.

The Tongariro Volcanic Centre developed over the last 275,000 years and contains the active andesitic volcanic cones of Ruapehu, Tongariro, and Ngauruhoe (really a side cone of Tongariro). Ruapehu erupts about once a decade, and while the eruptions cause havoc for skiers, plane flights and hydroelectric dams, the eruptions are relatively minor. However, the sudden collapse of the crater wall caused major problems when it generated a lahar in 1953, that destroyed a rail bridge, and caused 151 deaths at Tangiwai. The last significant eruption was 1995–96. Ngauruhoe last erupted 1973–75. Taranaki is a perfectly formed andesitic strato-volcano, that last erupted in 1755.

Lake Taupō, the largest lake in the North Island, is a volcanic caldera, responsible for rhyolitic eruptions about once every 1,000 years. The largest eruption in the last 65,000 years was the cataclysmic Oruanui Eruption 26,500 years ago, producing 530 cubic kilometres of magma. The most recent eruption, around 233 AD was also a major event, the biggest eruption worldwide in the last 5,000 years. The eruption caused a pyroclastic flow that devastated the land from Waiouru to Rotorua in 10 minutes.

The Ōkataina Volcanic Centre, to the East of Rotorua, is also responsible for major cataclysmic rhyolitic eruptions. The last eruption, of Tarawera and Lake Rotomahana in 1886, was a relatively minor eruption, which was thought to have destroyed the famous Pink and White Terraces, and covered much of the surrounding countryside in ash, killing over 100 people. In 2017 researchers rediscovered the locations of the Pink and White Terraces using a forgotten survey from 1859. Many lakes around Rotorua are calderas from rhyolitic eruptions. For example, Lake Rotorua erupted around 13,500 years ago.

A line of undersea volcanoes extends out along the Kermadec Ridge. Whakaari / White Island, in the Bay of Plenty, represents the southern end of this chain and is a very active andesitic volcano, erupting with great frequency. It has the potential to cause a tsunami in the Bay of Plenty, as does the dormant Mayor Island / Tūhua volcano.

The Taupō Volcanic Zone is known for its geothermal activity. For example, Rotorua and the surrounding area have many areas with geysers, silica terraces, fumaroles, mud-pools, hot springs, etc. Notable geothermal areas include Whakarewarewa, Tikitere, Waimangu, Waiotapu, Craters of the Moon and Orakei Korako. Geothermal energy is used to generate electricity at Wairakei, near Taupō. Hot pools abound throughout New Zealand. Geothermal energy is used to generate electricity in the Taupō Volcanic Zone.

== Modern tectonic setting and earthquakes ==
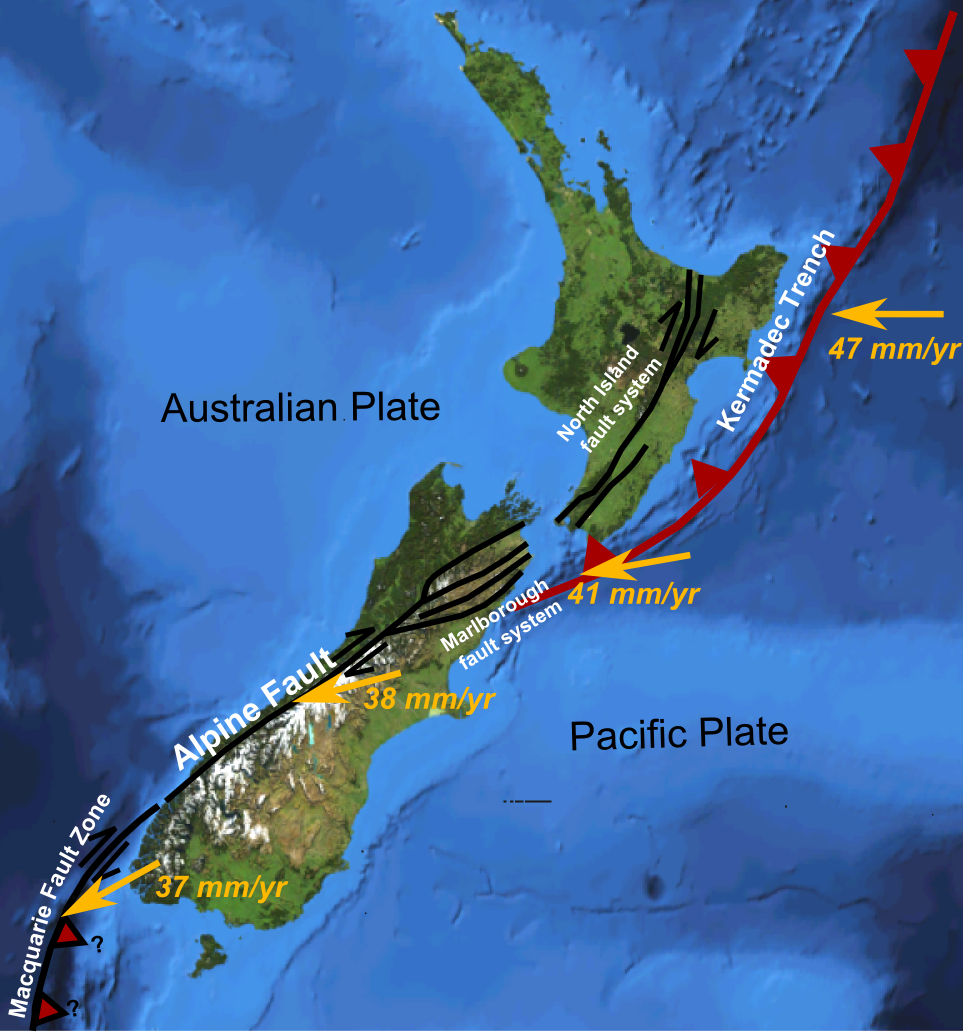
Major active fault zones of New Zealand showing variation in displacement vector of Pacific Plate relative to Australian Plate along the boundary

New Zealand is currently astride the convergent boundary between the Pacific and Australian Plates. Over time, the relative motion of the plates has altered and the current configuration is geologically recent. Currently the Pacific Plate is subducted beneath the Australian Plate from around Tonga in the north, through the Tonga Trench, Kermadec Trench, and Hikurangi Trough to the east of the North Island of New Zealand, down to Cook Strait. Through most of the South Island, the plates slide past each other (Alpine Fault), with slight obduction of the Pacific Plate over the Australian Plate, forming Southern Alps. From Fiordland south, the Australian Plate subducts under the Pacific Plate forming the Puysegur Trench. This configuration has led to volcanism and extension in the North Island forming the Taupō Volcanic Zone and uplift in the South Island forming the Southern Alps.

The Pacific Plate is colliding with the Australian Plate at a rate of about 40 mm/yr. The East coast of the North Island is being compressed and lifted by this collision, producing the North Island and Marlborough Fault Systems. The East Coast of the North Island is also rotating clockwise, relative to Northland, Auckland and Taranaki, stretching the Bay of Plenty, and producing the Hauraki Rift (Hauraki Plains and Hauraki Gulf) and Taupō Volcanic Zone. The East Coast of the South Island is sliding obliquely towards the Alpine Fault, relative to Westland, causing the Southern Alps to rise about 10 mm/yr (although they are also worn down at a similar rate). The Hauraki Plains, Hamilton, Bay of Plenty, Marlborough Sounds, and Christchurch are sinking. The Marlborough Sounds are known for their sunken mountain ranges. As Wellington rises, and Marlborough sinks, Cook Strait is being shifted further south.

Great stress is built up in the Earth's crust due to the constant movement of the tectonic plates. This stress is released by earthquakes, which can occur on the plate boundary or on any of thousands of smaller faults throughout New Zealand. Because the Pacific Plate is subducting under the eastern side of the North Island, there are frequent deep earthquakes east of a line from the Bay of Plenty to Nelson (the approximate edge of the subducted plate), with the earthquakes being deeper to the west, and shallower to the east. Because the Australian Plate is subducting under the Pacific Plate in Fiordland, there are frequent deep earthquakes near Fiordland, with the earthquakes being deeper to the east and shallower near the west.

Shallow earthquakes are more widespread, occurring almost everywhere throughout New Zealand (especially the Bay of Plenty, East Cape to Marlborough, and Alpine Fault). However, Northland, Waikato, and Otago are relatively stable. Canterbury had been without a major earthquake in recorded history until the M_{w} 7.1 Canterbury earthquake on 4 September 2010. The volcanic activity in the central North island also creates many shallow earthquakes.

== Paleoclimate of New Zealand ==
Global palaeotemperature graphs (compressed scale) note the warmer Eocene and Miocene in green and the Ice Age in blue.

Since Zealandia separated from Gondwana (80 mya) in the Cretaceous the climate has typically been far warmer than today. However, since the Quaternary glaciation (2.9 mya) Zealandia has experienced climate either cooler or only slightly warmer than today.

In the Cretaceous, New Zealand was positioned at 80 degrees south at the boundary between Antarctica and Australia. But it was covered in trees as the climate of 90 million years ago was much warmer and wetter than today. During the warm Eocene period vast swamps covered New Zealand which became coal seams in Southland and Waikato. In the Miocene there are paleontological records of warm lakes in Central Otago with palm trees and small land mammals.

Over the past 30,000 years three major climate events are recorded in New Zealand, the last glacial maximum's coldest period from 28 to 18,000 years ago, a transitional period from 18 to 11,000 years ago and the Holocene Inter Glacial which has been occurring for the past 11,000 years. Throughout the last glacial maximum, global sea levels were about 130 metres (430 feet) lower than present levels. When this happened the North Island, South Island, and Stewart Island were joined. Temperatures dropped by about 4–5 °C. Much of the Southern Alps and Fiordland were glaciated, but the rest of New Zealand was largely ice-free. The land north of Hamilton was forested, but much of the rest of New Zealand was covered in grass or shrubs, due to the cold and dry climate. This lack of vegetation cover lead to greater wind erosion and the deposition of loess (windblown dust). The study of New Zealand's paleoclimate has settled some of the debate regarding links between the Little Ice Age (LIA) in the Northern Hemisphere and the climate in New Zealand at the same time. The key facts to emerge are that New Zealand did experience a noticeable cooler climate, but at a slightly later date than in the Northern Hemisphere.

== Geological hazards ==
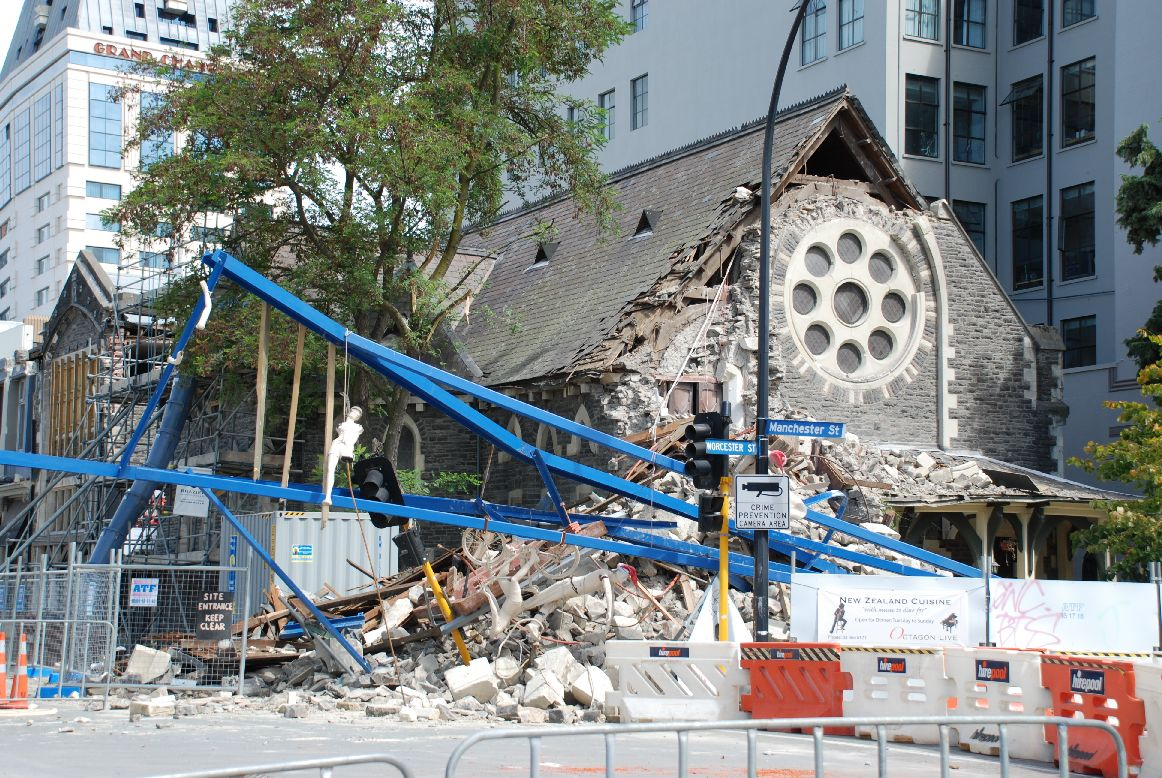
Earthquake damage in Christchurch (2011).

New Zealand suffers from many natural hazards, including earthquakes and tsunamis, volcanic and hydrothermal eruptions and landslides.

The largest earthquake in New Zealand was an M8.2 event in the Wairarapa, in 1855, and the most deaths (261) occurred in a M7.8 earthquake in Hawkes Bay in 1931. Widespread property damage was caused by the 2010 Canterbury earthquake, which measured 7.1; The M6.3 aftershock of 22 February 2011 (2011 Canterbury earthquake) resulted in 185 fatalities. Most recently, the M7.8 Kaikōura earthquake struck just after midnight on 14 November 2016, killing two people in the remote Kaikōura area northeast of Christchurch. Numerous aftershocks of M5.0 or greater are spread over a large area between Wellington and Culverden.

New Zealand is at risk from tsunamis that are generated from both local and international faults. The eastern coast of New Zealand is most at risk as the Pacific Ocean is more tectonically active than the Tasman Sea. Locally the faults along the North Island's east coast provide the greatest risk. Minor tsunamis have occurred in New Zealand from earthquakes in Chile, Alaska and Japan.

There are many potentially dangerous volcanoes in the Taupō Volcanic Zone. The most severe volcanic eruption since the arrival of Europeans is the Tarawera eruption in 1886. A lahar from Mount Ruapehu destroyed a bridge and derailed a train in December 1953, killing 151 people. Even a minor eruption at Ruapehu could cause the loss of electricity for Auckland, due to ash on the power lines, and in the Waikato River (stopping the generation of hydroelectric power).

Many parts of New Zealand are susceptible to landslides, particularly due to deforestation and the high earthquake risk. Much of the North Island is steep, and composed of soft mudstone known as papa, that easily generates landslides.

== Geological resources ==
New Zealand main geological resources are coal, gold, oil, and natural gas. Coal has been mined in Northland, the Waikato, Taranaki, Nelson and Westland, Canterbury, Otago, and Southland. The West Coast contains some of New Zealand's best bituminous coal. The largest coal deposits occur in Southland. Gold has been mined in the Coromandel and Kaimai Ranges (especially the Martha Mine at Waihi), Westland, Central Otago, and Eastern Otago (especially Macraes Mine), and on the west coast of the South Island. The only area in New Zealand with significant known oil and gas deposits is the Taranaki area, but many other offshore areas have the potential for deposits. Iron sand is also plentiful on the west coast from Taranaki to Auckland. Jade (Pounamu in Māori) from South Island ophiolites continues to be extracted, mostly from alluvium, and worked for sale. Groundwater reservoirs are extracted throughout the country, but are particularly valuable in the dryer eastern regions of both the North and South Islands. Some of these reservoirs also can be used in low temperature heating and for agricultural frost protection, as well as being a potable resource.

== History of New Zealand geology ==
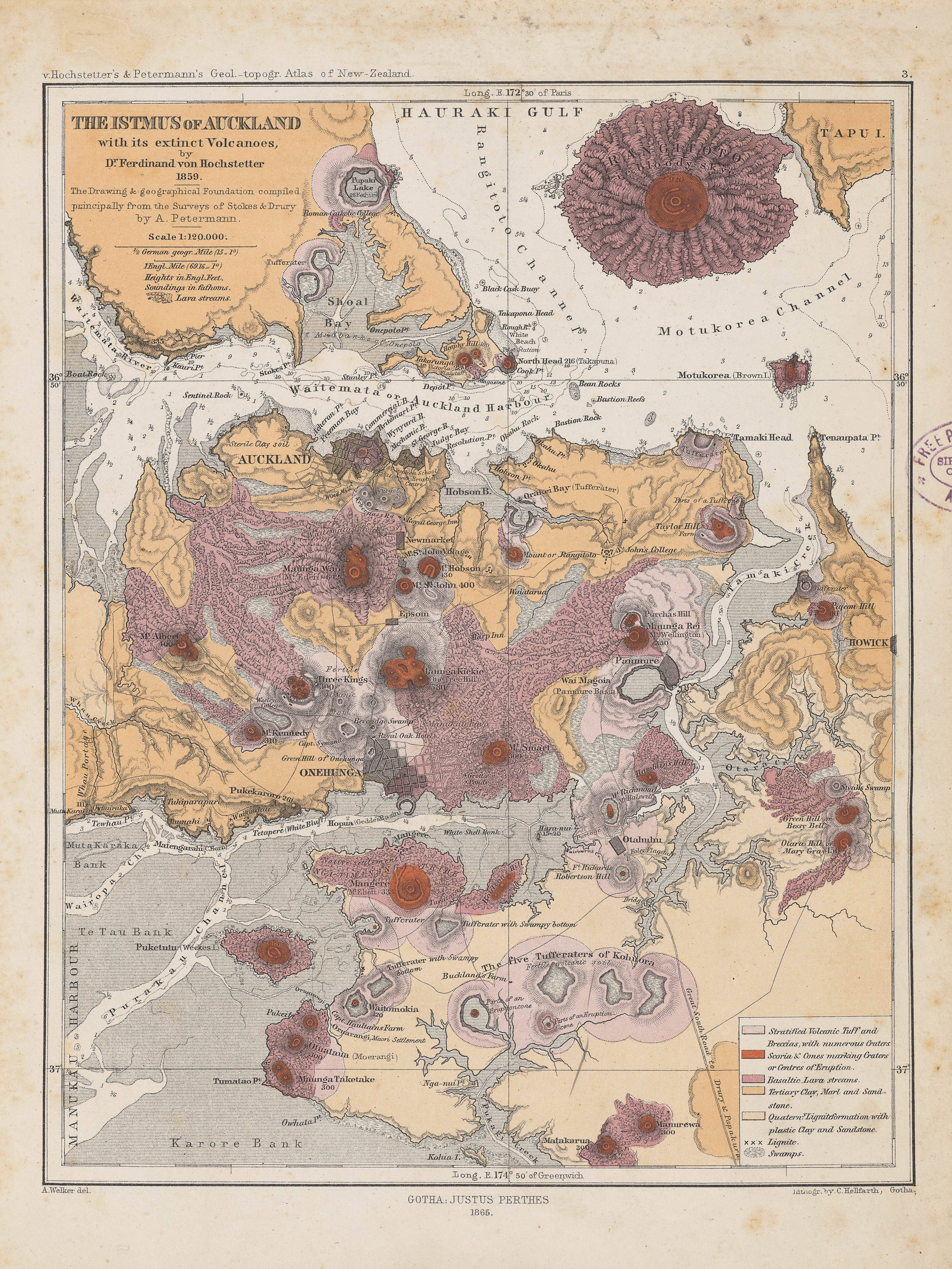
Hochstetter's map of the Auckland volcanic field (1859).

The detailed study of New Zealand's geology began with Julius von Haast and Ferdinand von Hochstetter who created numerous regional geological maps of the country during resource exploration in the mid-late 1800s. In 1865 James Hector was appointed to found the Geological Survey of New Zealand. Patrick Marshall coined the terms andesite line and ignimbrite in the early 1900s while working in the Taupō Volcanic Zone. Harold Wellman discovered the Alpine Fault and its 480 km offset in 1941. Even though Wellman proved that large blocks of land could move considerable distances, the New Zealand geological survey was largely a late adopter of plate tectonics.

Charles Cotton became an international authority on geomorphology using New Zealand active tectonics and variable climate to create universally applicably rules. His major works becoming standard text books in New Zealand and overseas. Charles Fleming established the Wanganui Basin as a classic site for studying past sea levels and climates. In 1975 the palaeontologist Joan Wiffen discovered the first dinosaur fossils in New Zealand.

The Geological Survey of New Zealand now known as GNS Science has done extensive mapping through New Zealand at 1:250,000 and 1:50:000 scales. The most modern map series are the "QMAPs" at 1:250,000. New Zealand's geological research is published by GNS Science, in the New Zealand Journal of Geology and Geophysics, and internationally. A Map showing the distribution of earthquakes in New Zealand can be obtained from Te Ara: The Encyclopedia of New Zealand. Current earthquake and volcanic activity can be obtained from the GeoNet website. The universities of Auckland, Canterbury, Massey, Otago, Victoria and Waikato are activity engaged in geological research in New Zealand, Antarctica, the wider South Pacific and elsewhere.

== See also ==
- Geography of New Zealand
- Indo-Australian Plate
- Kaikōura Canyon
- List of dinosaurs of New Zealand
- List of rock formations of New Zealand
- New Zealand geologic time scale

=== Regional geology ===
- Geology of the Northland Region
- Geology of the Auckland Region
- Geology of the Waikato–King Country region
- Rotorua Caldera
- Taupō Volcano
- Mount Tongariro
- Mount Ngauruhoe
- Geology of the Raukumara region
- Geology of Taranaki
- Geology of the Wellington Region
- Geology of the Tasman District
- Geology of the Canterbury Region
- Geology of the West Coast Region
