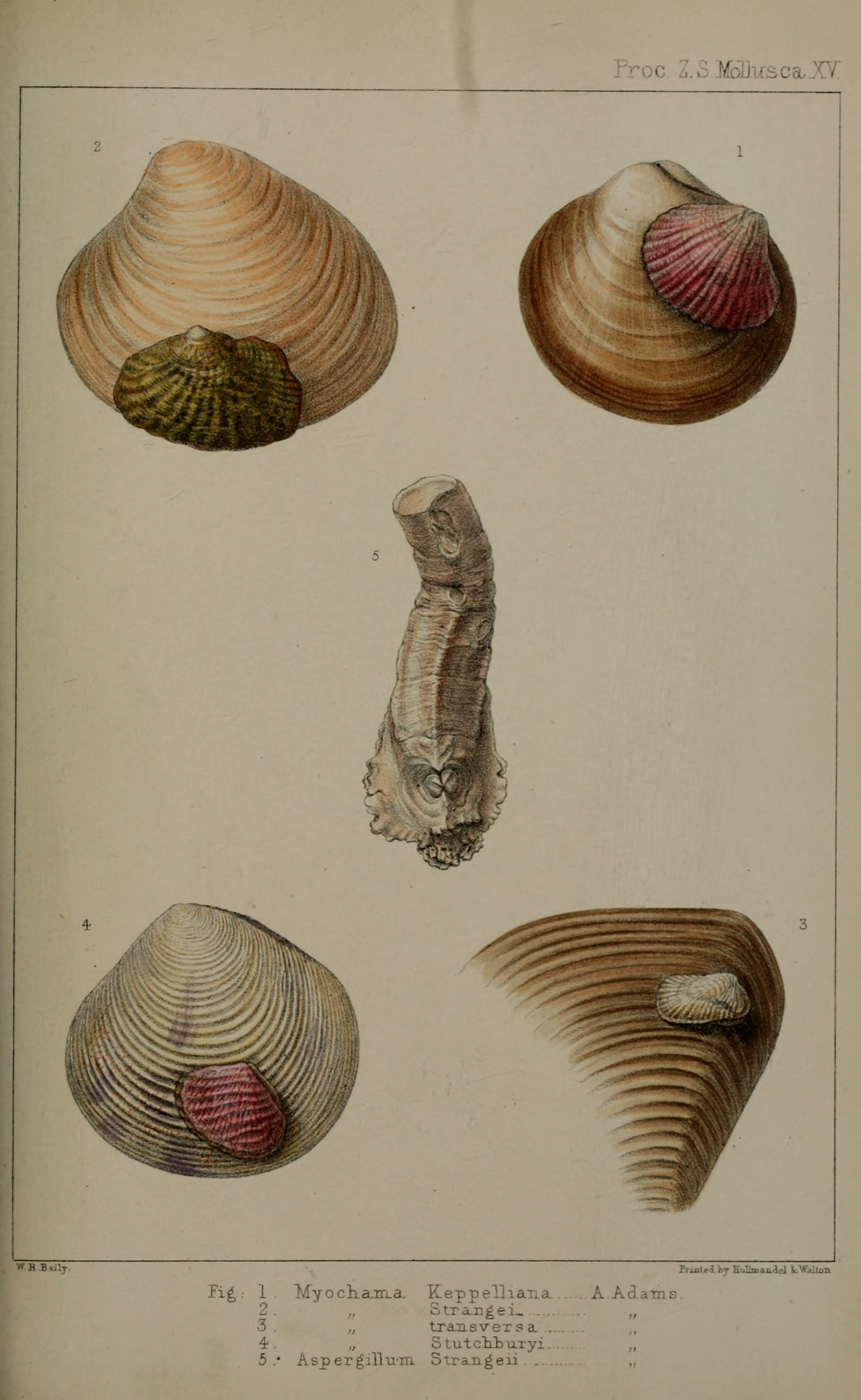
- (1) Myochama anomioides, (2) Myochama strangei, (3–4) Myochama transversa (5) Humphreyia strangei

Scientific classification
- Domain: Eukaryota
- Kingdom: Animalia
- Phylum: Mollusca
- Class: Bivalvia
- Family: Myochamidae
- Genus: Myochama; Stutchbury, 1830

= Myochama =

Myochama Temporal range: Late/Upper Pliocene–present, 3.6–0 Ma

Genus of bivalves

Myochama is a genus of bivalves in the family Myochamidae. They are restricted to the waters off southeastern Australia and New Zealand.

== Description ==
Myochama exhibit cementation where one valve is fixed to some hard substrate – similarly as oysters. In Myochama, it is the right valve that gets cemented, typically to the posterior region of shells of large infaunal bivalves. In Myochama anomioides, this happens when the shell is few millimeters in height (range 1.2–3.9 mm (0.05–0.15 in)). The cemented right valve is thin and flat or slightly convex, whereas the left valve is robust and strongly concave.

Typical substrata for attachment include shells of Neotrigonia, Venericardia, and Glycymeris. Individuals that attach themselves to living objects tend to do so at smaller sizes than those attaching to inanimate objects (e.g., dead shells, rocks).

Myochama probably have direct development (i.e., there are no free-living larvae).

== Species ==
There are four extant species:

- Myochama anomioides Stutchbury, 1830
- Myochama strangei A. Adams, 1850
- Myochama tasmanica (Tenison Woods, 1877)
- Myochama transversa A. Adams, 1850

There are also three species only known from the fossil record:

- †Myochama plana Tate, 1894
- †Myochama rugata Tate, 1894
- †Myochama trapezia Pritchard, 1895
