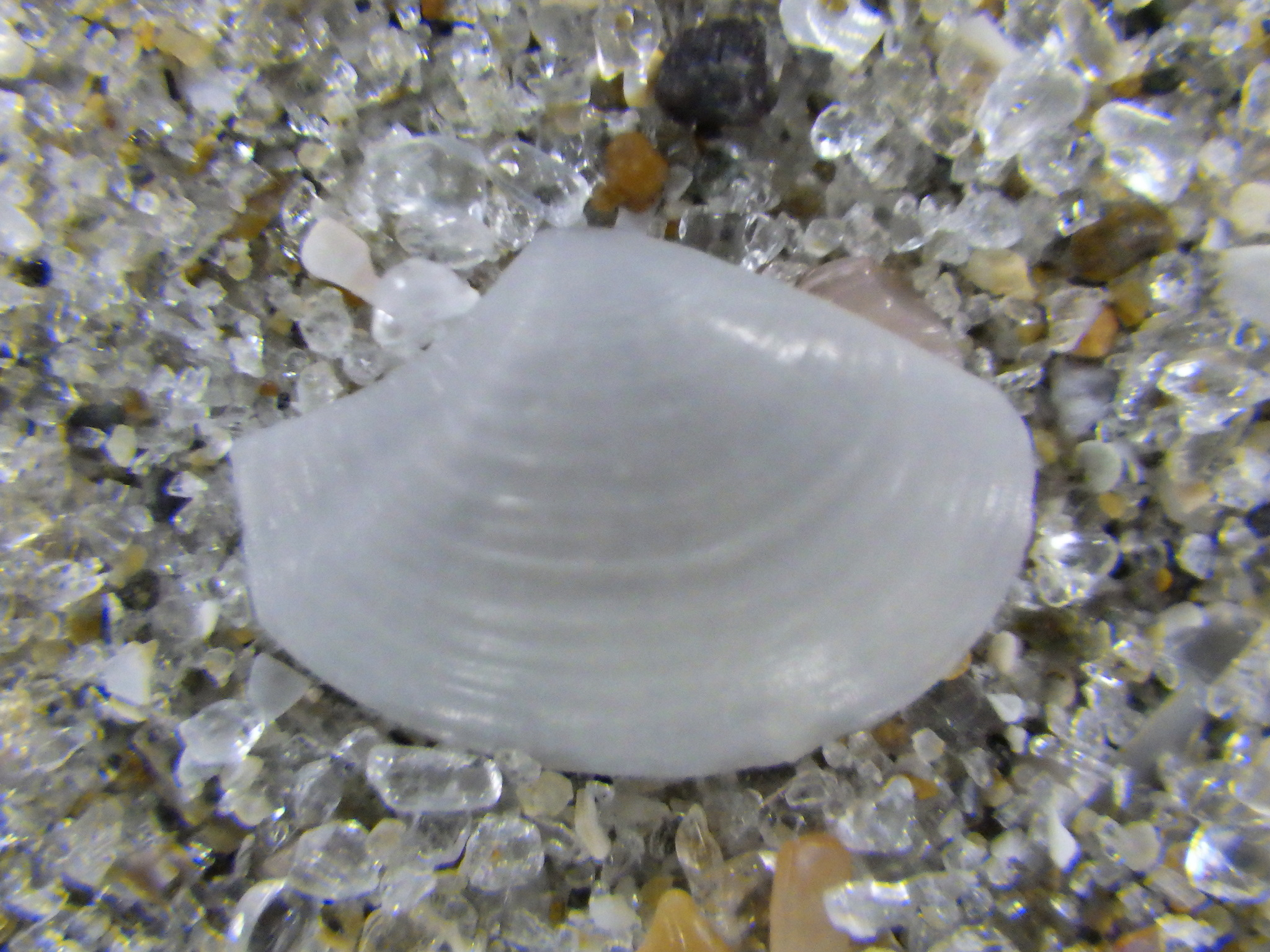

Scientific classification
- Kingdom: Animalia
- Phylum: Mollusca
- Class: Bivalvia
- Family: Myochamidae
- Genus: Myadora
- Species: M. boltoni

Binomial name
- Myadora boltoni E. A. Smith, 1881

Synonyms
- Myodora boltoni E. A. Smith, 1881

= Myadora boltoni =

Species of bivalve

Myadora boltoni is a marine bivalve mollusc of the family Myochamidae. It is endemic to New Zealand. It is common on protected sandflats.

== Description ==
The shell measures about 9×14 mm (0.35×0.55 in) by length and width. One valve is moderately convex whereas the other valve is slightly concave.
