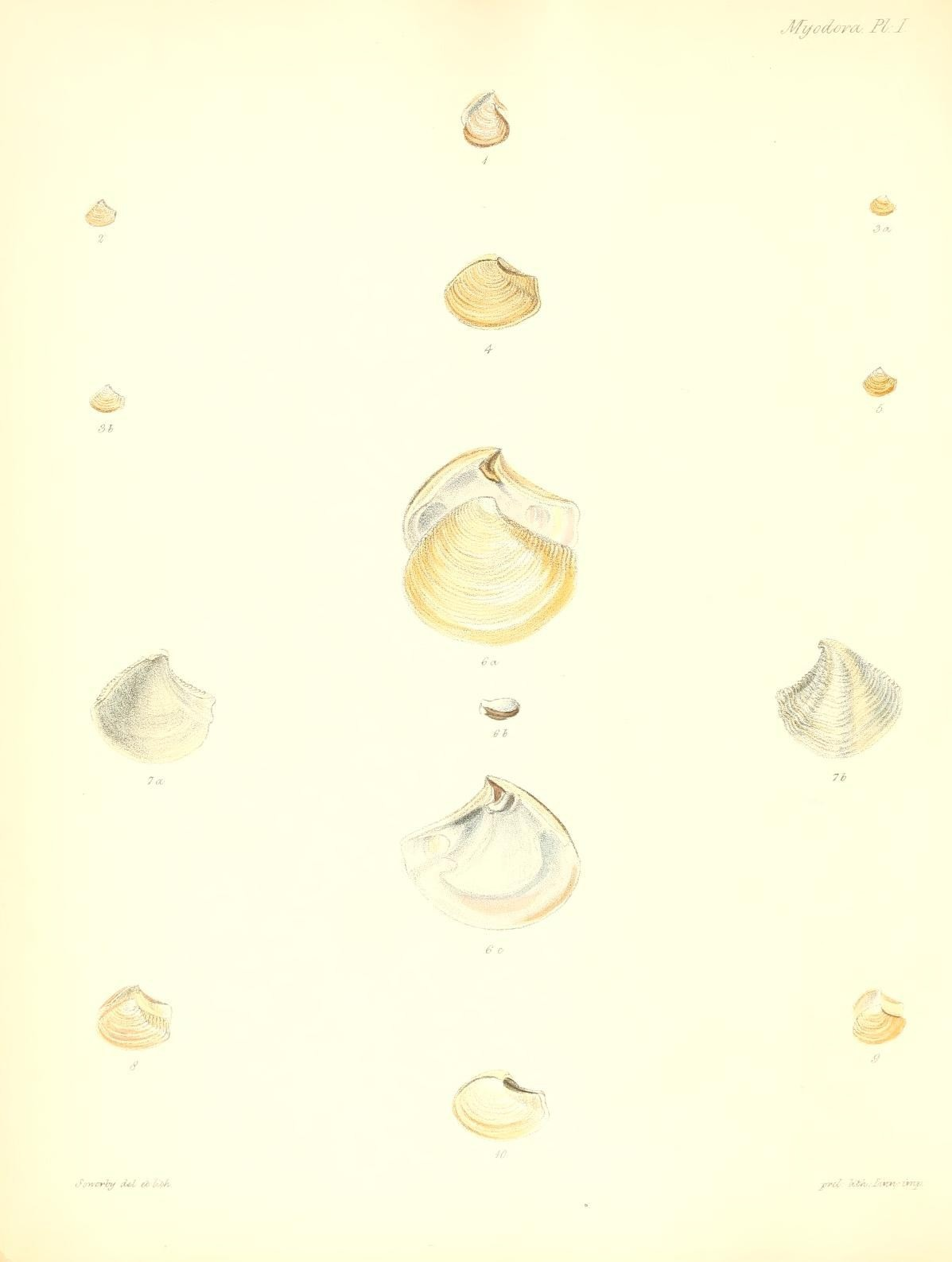
- Myadora in Conchologia Iconica

Scientific classification
- Kingdom: Animalia
- Phylum: Mollusca
- Class: Bivalvia
- Family: Myochamidae
- Genus: Myadora; Gray, 1840

Synonyms
- Myodora – misspelling

= Myadora =

Myadora Temporal range: Early/Lower Oligocene–present, 33.9–0 Ma

Ggenus of bivalves

Myadora is a genus of marine bivalves in the family Myochamidae. They are shallow-burrowing bivalves, able to burrow rapidly.

== Description ==
In Myadora, the left valve is flat or slightly concave while the right valve is convex.

== Species ==
A large number of species is known from the fossil record, many exclusively so. Species within the genus Myadora include:

- †Myadora aequilateralis R. M. Johnston, 1880
- Myadora albida Tenison Woods, 1876
- †Myadora alea Cotton, 1947
- †Myadora angustior Tate, 1887
- Myadora antipodum E. A. Smith, 1881
- †Myadora australis R. M. Johnston, 1880
- Myadora boltoni E. A. Smith, 1881
- Myadora brevis (G. B. Sowerby I, 1827)
- Myadora complexa Iredale, 1924
- Myadora compressa E. A. Smith, 1881
- Myadora convexa Angas, 1865
- †Myadora corrugata Tate, 1887
- Myadora crassa (Stutchbury, 1830)
- †Myadora delta Marwick, 1929
- Myadora fluctuosa A. A. Gould, 1861
- †Myadora fortecosta Beu, 2006
- †Myadora gabrieli Chapman & Crespin, 1928
- †Myadora kaiiwiensis A. W. B. Powell, 1931
- †Myadora lamellata Tate, 1887
- Myadora novaezelandiae E. A. Smith, 1881
- Myadora oblonga Reeve, 1844
- Myadora ovata Reeve, 1844
- Myadora pandoriformis (Stutchbury, 1830)
- †Myadora praelonga Tate, 1887
- Myadora pulleinei Hedley, 1906
- Myadora rectangulata Barnard, 1964
- Myadora reeveana E. A. Smith, 1881
- Myadora rotundata G. B. Sowerby III, 1875
- Myadora royana Iredale, 1924
- Myadora striata (Quoy & Gaimard, 1835)
- Myadora subrostrata E. A. Smith, 1881
- †Myadora tenuilirata Tate, 1887
- Myadora tessera Hedley, 1912
- Myadora trigona Reeve, 1844
- †Myadora waitotarana A. W. B. Powell, 1931
