= Myadora antipodum =

Scientific classification
- Kingdom: Animalia
- Phylum: Mollusca
- Class: Bivalvia
- Family: Myochamidae
- Genus: Myadora
- Species: M. antipodum

Binomial name
- Myadora antipodum E. A. Smith, 1881

Synonyms
- Myodora antipodum E. A. Smith, 1881

Species of bivalve

Myadora antipodum is a marine bivalve mollusc of the family Myochamidae. It is endemic to New Zealand.

== Description ==
The shell measures about 9×13 mm (0.35×0.51 in) by length and width. One valve is moderately convex whereas the other valve is slightly concave.
