= Geology of Taranaki =

The Taranaki region of New Zealand is built upon the Median Batholith in the west, and Greywacke Rocks in the east. However, no rocks older than Miocene times are visible at the surface. The dominant feature of the Taranaki region is the andesitic stratovolcano of Mount Taranaki, which is only about 130,000 years old. The dissected hill country to the East of the Taranaki Peninsula, and West of the Central Volcanic Plateau (Ruapehu and Tongariro) is composed of soft Miocene to Pleistocene sandstone and mudstone. The coastal lowlands around Wanganui to the South have well-developed Quaternary marine terraces, and coastal sand dunes.

The Taranaki Basin is the only area in New Zealand with significant known oil and gas deposits, many of them offshore.

== Basement rocks ==
Basement rocks do not outcrop in the Taranaki region due to the thick sedimentary and volcanic cover. However, the basement rocks have been inferred through exploration drilling, geophysical surveys and extrapolation from neighbouring regions. The Median Batholith lies to the West of a line between New Plymouth and Manaia. To the East of this line are, in order, the Brook Street, Murihiku, Dun Mountain–Maitai, Caples, Waipapa (Morrinsville), and Torlesse (Kaweka) terranes, mostly composed of Greywacke (apart from the ophiolitic Dun Mountain–Maitai terrane).

== Te Kuiti Group coal and limestone ==
Throughout much of the West of the North Island, rocks containing coal were formed from swampland in Late Eocene times (37–34 Ma). The land sunk and the sea transgressed, and calcareous sandstone, mudstone, and limestone were deposited in Oligocene times (34–24 Ma). These rocks underlie more recent Miocene rocks, around the Taranaki Peninsula and surrounding seas. The Eocene rocks often provide oil and gas deposits of the Taranaki region. Mudstone anticlines often provide a suitable sealing cover.

== Miocene to recent sediment ==
In early Miocene times (24 Ma), plate convergence caused regional compression. Since then, sedimentation has occurred throughout the Taranaki region, generating sandstones, soft mudstones, and some limestone.

The coastal lowlands around Wanganui have well-developed Quaternary marine terraces (caused by sea-level fluctuations and tectonic uplift), and coastal sand dunes.

== Mohakatino volcanic arc ==
The volcanic arc that developed to the West of Northland and Auckland in Miocene times (23 Ma) extended further South towards Taranaki. These andesitic and basaltic volcanoes were mostly active in middle Miocene times (14-11 Ma), but some were still active in late Miocene times (5 Ma). They have all eroded away.

== Recent volcanic activity ==
Several largely andesitic volcanoes have erupted in Taranaki in the last two million years. They align in a northwest–southeast direction, generally getting younger to the Southeast. Mount Taranaki, the most recent, remains potentially active.

The volcanic plugs, Paritutu, forming part of New Plymouth's harbour, and the Sugar Loaf Islands, offshore from New Plymouth, represent the remnants of a large volcano that erupted 1.8 Ma ago.

Kaitake, near the coast to the Northwest of Mount Taranaki, erupted 0.6 Ma ago.

Pouakai, on the Northwest side of Mount Taranaki, erupted around 255,000-215,000 years ago.

Pukeiti is probably around 17,000 years old.

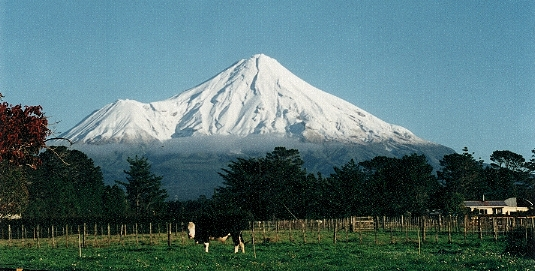
View of Mount Taranaki from Stratford, facing west. Fanthams Peak is to the left of the main peak.

Mount Taranaki, together with its parasitic cone of Fanthams Peak, dominates the topography of the Taranaki Peninsula. The ancestral Taranaki volcano has probably existed for at least 130,000 years, repeatedly forming and collapsing over its history. The lava around Dawson Falls has been dated as 18,000 years old. The lava flows that formed the upper cone have been dated as no older than 7,000 years. Fanthams Peak has lava flows dated as 3,200 years old. The lava forming the dome of Mount Taranaki was emplaced in 1755 CE.

The Central Volcanic Plateau (notably Mounts Ruapehu and Tongariro), is also active. The main effects of eruptions from this area on the Taranaki region involve the generation of lahars flowing down the Whangaehu River (from Ruapehu), and the Whanganui River (from both Ruapehu and Tongariro).

== Geological resources ==
The Taranaki Peninsula and surrounding sea provides New Zealand with its only known commercial oil and gas fields, including Kapuni, Maui, and Pohokura (see also Oil and gas industry in New Zealand). The rocks above the deposits have an appropriate shape, and are of a suitable composition to create a seal, and trap the oil and gas as it migrates up towards the surface. The continental shelf West of the Taranaki Peninsula is shallow, making it easy to drill for oil and gas.

The Taranaki region is well known for its black sand, which is mined for iron and other products.

== Geological sites ==
- Mount Taranaki is well worth hiking around.
- Paritutu and Sugar Loaf Islands can be seen near New Plymouth.
- The coastal highway North of Taranaki has rugged sandstone cliffs, and black sand beaches.
- The coastal highway from New Plymouth South to Wanganui is also of interest, with black sand beaches, and marine terraces.
- The highway from Stratford to Taumarunui, or Wanganui to Raetahi via the Whanganui River shows the sandstones and mudstones of the area.

== Maps ==
Geological maps of New Zealand can be obtained from the New Zealand Institute of Geological and Nuclear Science (GNS Science), a New Zealand Government Research Institute.

GNS provides a free Map of New Zealand's Geological Foundations.

The main maps are the 1 : 250 000 QMap series, which will be completed as a series of 21 maps in 2010. Low resolution versions of these maps (without the associated booklet) can be downloaded from the GNS site for free. The map for the Taranaki Area was published in 2008.

== See also ==
- Geology of New Zealand
