= Wanganui Basin =

Geological area of the North Island of New Zealand

Coordinates: 40°0′S 174°45′E

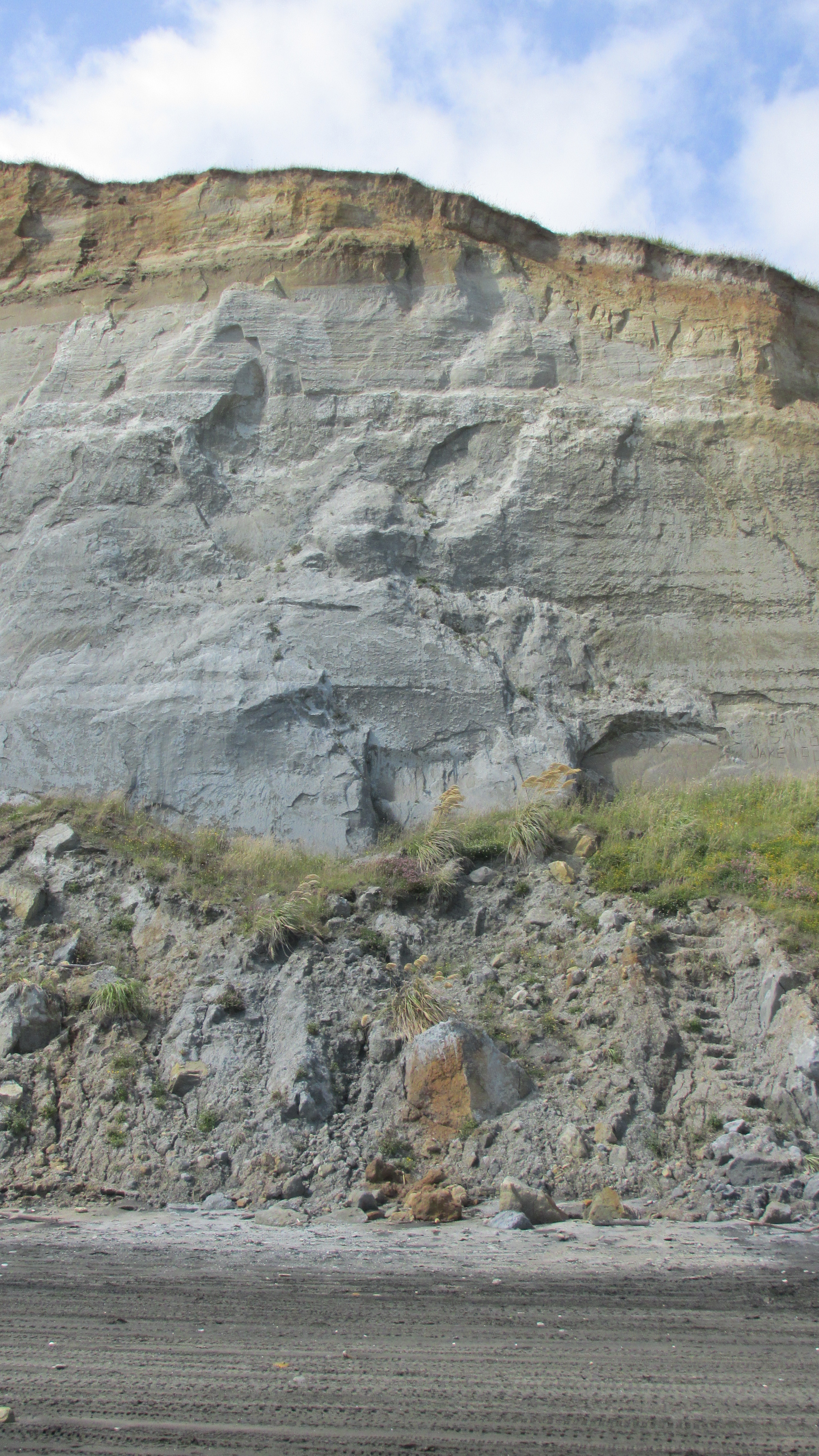
Cliff at Kai Iwi Beach

The Wanganui Basin (also spelled Whanganui Basin) is an onshore-offshore basin on the North Island of New Zealand. The basin provides an important stratigraphic and palaeontological record of the late Neogene marine environment of New Zealand.

== Location and setting ==
The Wanganui Basin is located on the west coast of the North Island of New Zealand, within the Manawatū-Whanganui and Taranaki regions. The basin is roughly oval, with the longer (approximately 180 kilometres (110 miles)) axis running west-south-west/east-north-east, and has a width of approximately 100 kilometres (62 miles). A little under half of the basin is onshore, extending inland around the lower reaches of the Whanganui and Rangitikei Rivers before terminating at the foot of the North Island Volcanic Plateau. The southern half of the basin extends into the South Taranaki Bight. The major population centre within the basin is along the coast, around the city of Whanganui.

== Geology ==
=== Stratigraphy ===
The Wanganui Basin is "one of the most complete late Neogene marine stratigraphic records in the world," and is an important region for geological and palaeontological research.

The basin provides the basis for the eponymous Wanganui epoch in the New Zealand geologic time scale, which covers the Pliocene, Pleistocene and Holocene over the last 5.33 million years. The series was first described in depth and compared to glacial cycles by Charles Fleming, which has had a lasting impact upon subsequent stratigraphic, palaeontological and palaeoecological research. Each stage within the Wanganui epoch is named after regions of the Wanganui Basin series.

=== Key sites ===
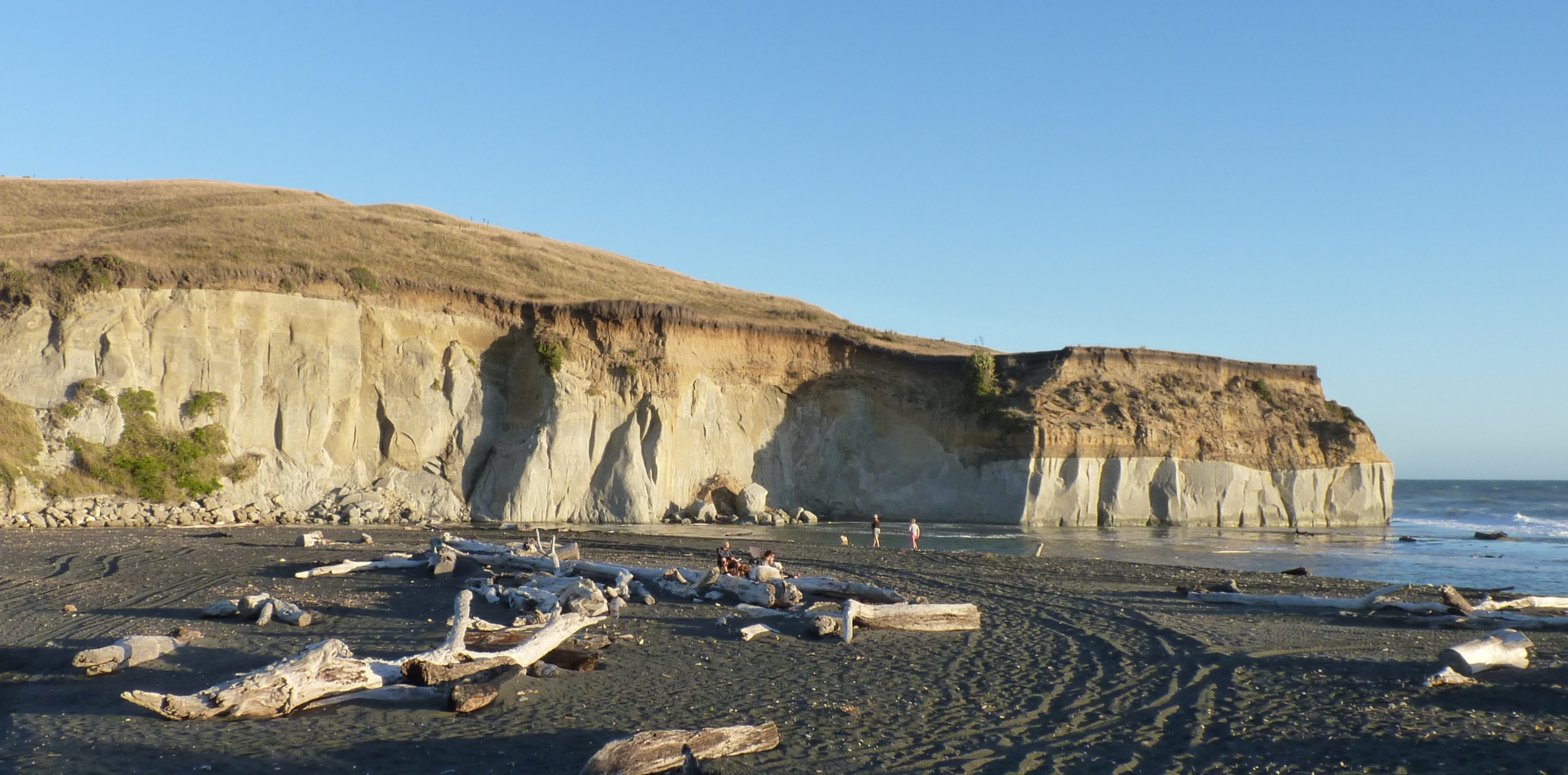
Kai Iwi Beach

- Castlecliff
- Nukumaru

== Palaeontology ==
Sediments within the basin are rich with shallow marine invertebrate fossils, including molluscs and bryozoans. The most common fossilized molluscan shells belong to the bivalve genera Dosinia and Chlamys and the gastropod genera Zethalia and Murex. Shells of Aeneator, Buccinulum, Penion, Alcithoe, and Amalda marine snails are also frequent.

== See also ==
- Geology of Taranaki
- New Zealand geologic timescale
- Stratigraphy of New Zealand
