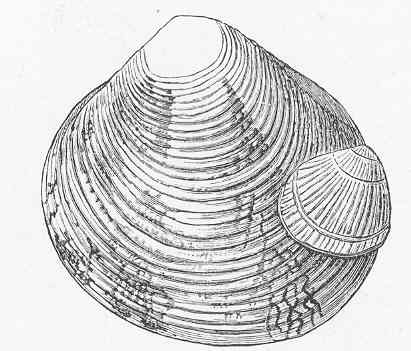
- Myochama transversa on Circe undatina

Scientific classification
- Kingdom: Animalia
- Phylum: Mollusca
- Class: Bivalvia
- Superorder: Anomalodesmata
- Superfamily: Myochamoidea
- Family: Myochamidae; P. P. Carpenter, 1861

Genera
- 4, see text.

= Myochamidae =

Family of bivalves

Myochamidae is a family of marine bivalves in the superorder Anomalodesmata. It includes both cementing and burrowing species.

== Genera ==
There are four genera within the family Myochamidae:

- Hunkydora Fleming, 1948
- Myadora Gray, 1840
- Myadoropsis Habe, 1960
- Myochama Stutchbury, 1830
