= South Island surface volcanism =

Volcanic deposits of South Island, New Zealand

South Island Surface Volcanic Deposits
- Stratigraphic range: Miocene, ~100–5 Ma
- Type: Igneous
- Overlies: Murihiku Terrane, Caples Terrane, Torlesse and Waipapa Composite Terranes Greywacke, Haast Schist

Lithology
- Primary: Basalt, trachyte, phonolite, olivine , andesite and rhyolite

Location
- Coordinates: 44°S 171°E
- Region: South Island
- Country: New Zealand
- Map of selected surface volcanic features in the South Island which includes features from volcanic activity in last 100 million years in New Zealand. Legend: Key for the volcanics that are shown with panning is: basalt (shades of brown/orange); monogenetic basalts; undifferentiated basalts; arc basalts; arc ring basalts; olivine (basalts shades of olive); phonolite (pale salmon); dacite; andesite (shades of red); basaltic andesite; rhyolite, (ignimbrite is lighter shades of violet); plutonic or intusive (gray) - so dolerite/diabase/microgabbro will have shadings towards gray compared to erupted basalt.; Clicking on the rectangle icon enables full window and mouse-over with volcano name/wikilink and ages before present.

The volcanic activity in the South Island of New Zealand terminated 5 million years ago as the more northern parts of the North Island became extremely volcanically active. The South Islands surface geology reflects the uplift of the Pacific plate as it collides with the Indo-Australian plate along the Alpine Fault over the last 12 million years and the termination of subduction, about 100 to 105 million years ago. There is a very small chance of reactivation of volcanism in the Dunedin Volcano. This chance is made slightly higher by the observation that Southland's Solander Islands / Hautere just off the coast of the South Island were active as recently as 50,000 years old, and on a larger scale 150,000 years old.

== Geology ==
The South Island portion of Zealandia is divided from the point of view of basement rocks into an older "Western Province", consisting mainly of greywacke, granite and gneiss, down the West Coast and in a swing to Stewart Island and an "Eastern Province", consisting mainly of younger greywacke and schist. These basements can be exposed but will not be considered further in this article and the sediments that overlay them and were often uplifted and tilted with the volcanics and penetrated, covered or interleaved by them up to 5 million years ago will only be considered in passing. For more detail see the Geology of New Zealand.

On a tributary of the East Eweburn near Naseby the stream cuts through formations that include a greater than 8 m (26 ft) thick layer of rhyolitic pumice tuff. An ignimbrite layer at least 20 m (66 ft) thick was recognised in road cuttings near Shag Point, also in Otago. Both deposits 50 km (31 mi) apart are now dated to 112 ± 0.2 million years ago and so likely come from a large single event.

The Mount Somers Volcanic Group (Mount Somers Volcanics) which are predominately andesitic and rhyolitic with ignimbrite, overlay the Rakaia terrane of the Torlesse Composite Terrane and extend from the Mount Somers region to the Banks Peninsula and are in the formation age range 100 to 80 million years ago. Accordingly later sedimentary and volcanic deposits overlay them in many areas not related to the rifting events that formed these volcanics rather like happened in the North Island Coromandel Volcanic Zone 20 to 5 million years ago and is now happening with the Taupō Rift and its associated very active Taupō Volcanic Zone.

Around 40 million years ago the undersea sedimentary basin in what is now eastern north Otago had basaltic activity and in due course with uplift the layered volcanics on present land tended to resist erosion so are now the surface deposits of what is termed the Waiareka-Deborah volcanic field. There are known to be many still undersea basaltic volcanics off the east coast such as the Maahunui volcanic field but ages are not assigned to most which are likely to be in the range 40 to 10 million years ago. The Maahunui volcanic field terminated activity 11 million years ago and is potentially associated with the similar timing Banks Volcano.

In the period from 20 to 5 million years ago two large basalt shield volcanoes, the Banks Peninsula Volcano which also has trachytic elements and the Dunedin Volcano which also has trachytic, olivine and phonolite elements erupted. The other main area of now land volcanism was what was termed the Waipiata basaltic monogenetic volcanic field Most of these volcanics turned out to have similar age and alkali lavas to the Dunedin Volcano so are now classified in the Dunedin volcanic group. In north Otago there is indeed overlap and at least two much later Dunedin volcanic group eruptives are on top of 20 million years ago earlier Waiareka-Deborah volcanic field eruptives.

The uplift of the Southern Alps has also exposed intrusive dykes and other formations which were possibly never surface volcanism but are important as composition and timing in the south are similar to those of the Dunedin volcanic group.

== Volcanic areas ==
=== Banks Peninsula ===
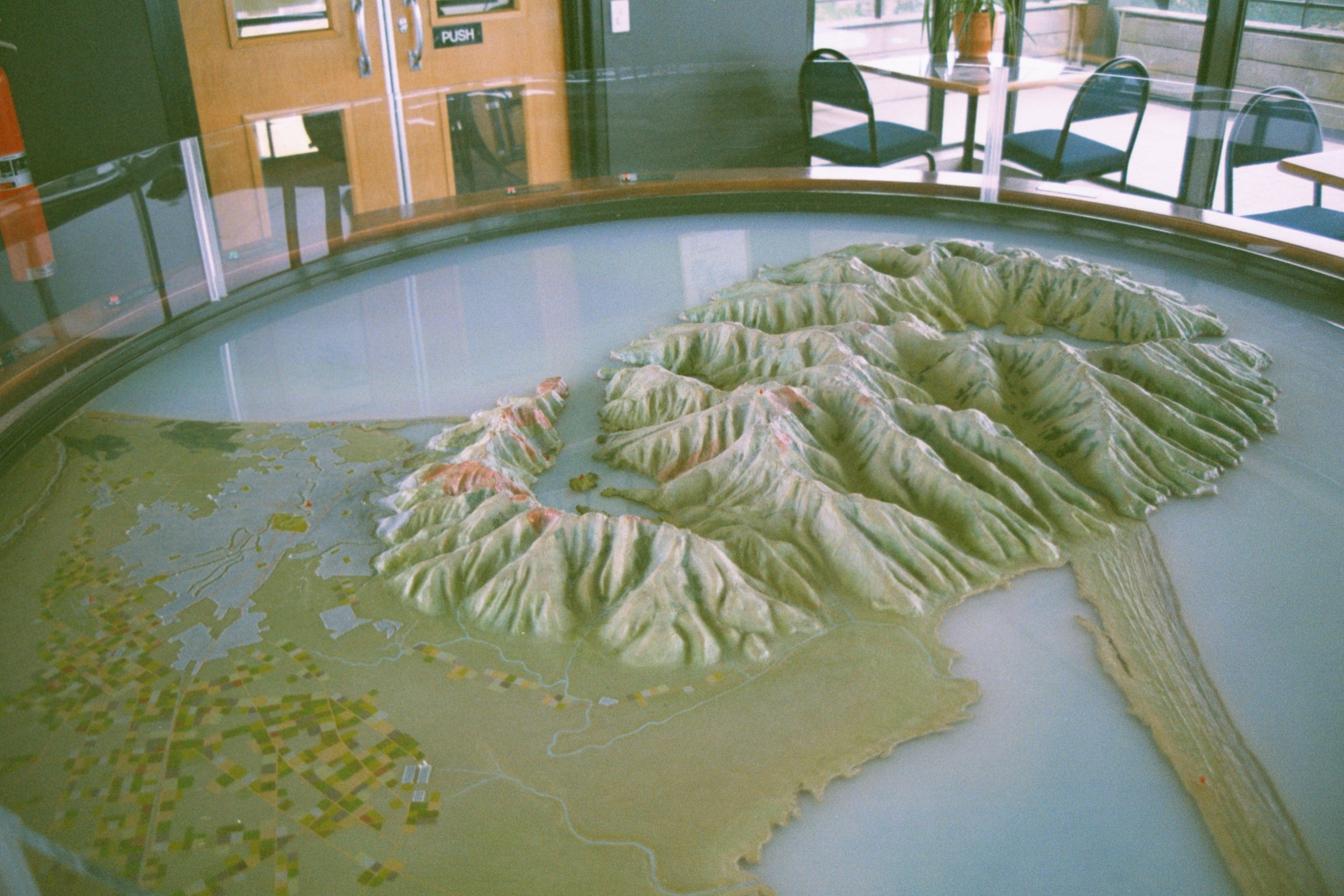
The mountainous terrain of Banks Peninsula contrasts with the nearby plains.

Banks Peninsula comprises the eroded remnants of two large stratovolcanoes, Lyttelton, which formed first, and Akaroa. These formed by intraplate volcanism through continental crust approximately eleven to eight million years ago (Miocene). The peninsula formed as offshore islands, with the volcanoes reaching to about 1,500 m above sea level. Two dominant craters were eroded, then flooded, to form the Lyttelton and Akaroa Harbours. The portion of crater rim lying between Lyttelton Harbour and Christchurch city forms the Port Hills.

=== Oamaru ===
Small sub-alkaline basalt to basaltic andesite Surtseyan volcanoes on the submerged continental shelf formed what was historically termed the Waiareka-Deborah volcanic group and now called the Waiareka-Deborah volcanic field in the area around Oamaru around 35 to 30 million years ago. A monogenetic volcanic field of more alkaline composition eruptives, with stronger surface features, as they are younger, extends north of Dunedin overlapping the southern Waiareka-Deborah volcanic field, and these volcanoes have now been characterised to be part of the Dunedin volcanic group.

=== Southern Alps ===
The Alpine Dyke Swarm of volcanic intusion took place about 25 million years ago and is located near Lake Wānaka in the Southern Alps.

=== Dunedin ===
The Dunedin Volcano formed during the Miocene, beginning with basaltic eruptions on the Otago Peninsula, is the largest volcano in the large Dunedin volcanic group. Large central-vent structures formed, and then large domes, with seawater interacting explosively with erupting submarine magma.

== Attribution ==
Copied content from Volcanism of New Zealand on pages creation date; see Volcanism of New Zealand: Revision history for attribution.
