= Waiareka-Deborah volcanic field =

Volcanic area in South Island, New Zealand

- Stratigraphic range: Oligocene (39.5–27.6 Ma)
- Type: Igneous
- Overlies: Rakaia Terrane
- Area: 890 square kilometres (340 sq mi)

Lithology
- Primary: Sub-alkaline basalt and basaltic andesite

Location
- Coordinates: 45.0°S 170.3°E
- Region: Otago
- Country: New Zealand

Type section
- Named for: Waiareka Valley, inland from Oamaru
- Map of surface volcanic features of the South Island centred near Oamaru. The basalts of the Waiareka-Deborah volcanic field are more red tinted than those of the Dunedin volcanic group. Clicking on the map enlarges it, and enables panning and mouseover of volcano name/wikilink and ages before present. Key for the volcanics that are shown with panning is: '"`UNIQ--templatestyles-00000005-QINU`"' basalt (shades of brown/orange), '"`UNIQ--templatestyles-00000006-QINU`"' monogenetic basalts, '"`UNIQ--templatestyles-00000007-QINU`"' undifferentiated basalts, '"`UNIQ--templatestyles-00000008-QINU`"' arc basalts, '"`UNIQ--templatestyles-00000009-QINU`"' arc ring basalts, '"`UNIQ--templatestyles-0000000A-QINU`"' olivine (basalts shades of olive), '"`UNIQ--templatestyles-0000000B-QINU`"' phonolite (pale salmon), '"`UNIQ--templatestyles-0000000C-QINU`"' dacite, '"`UNIQ--templatestyles-0000000D-QINU`"' andesite (shades of red), '"`UNIQ--templatestyles-0000000E-QINU`"' basaltic andesite, '"`UNIQ--templatestyles-0000000F-QINU`"' rhyolite, (ignimbrite is lighter shades of violet), and '"`UNIQ--templatestyles-00000010-QINU`"' plutonic or intusive (gray) - so dolerite/diabase/microgabbro will have shadings towards gray compared to erupted basalt.

The Waiareka-Deborah volcanic field is a group of sub-alkaline basalt to basaltic andesite composition volcanics, most of which erupted about 34 million years ago. There is a range of determined ages by various methods and sites although most have very similar timings. At Bridge Point one deposit has an age of 39.5 ± 1.8 and another 34.3 ± 0.5 million years ago. They are found near Oamaru, South Island New Zealand, and are small Surtseyan volcanoes that erupted originally on a submerged continental shelf.

The former term, the Waiareka-Deborah volcanic group should not be used as any alkali basalt volcanoes in this group and all of those in the former Waiareka volcanic field are now assigned to the Dunedin volcanic group and its monogenetic volcanic field.

== Geography ==
They extend on the present Otago coast south from just north of Oamaru, but well south of the Waitaki River, to the Moeraki Peninsula. The field has an area on land of about 890 square kilometres (340 sq mi). There are probably Southern Pacific Ocean subsurface components from sonar studies but these have not yet been characterised by core sampling. Accordingly, a further area of up to 3,500 square kilometres (1,400 sq mi) could yet be assigned to these volcanics. The furtherest inland deposit is at Basalt Hill just beyond the Maerewhenua River. There are Dunedin volcanic group eruptives between this and the coast and indeed most of the field is coastal.

== Geology ==
Deposits without an age may need reclassification due to complexity. The presence of six overlapping Surtseyan volcanoes at one site, Cape Wanbrow, is an example of this complexity. At least two examples of more recent alkaline Dunedin volcanic group eruptives through Waiareka-Deborah volcanic field crystalline rock have been characterised to date.

Waiareka-Deborah volcanic field
Feature	Age (Note: where more than one age is given for a location this is for separate deposit layers)	Geology/Comments
Basalt Hill	-	sub-alkaline basalt to basaltic andesite crystalline rock on underlying Cenozoic non-volcanic sediments.
Tokarahi Sill	-	sub-alkaline basalt to basaltic andesite crystalline rock on underlying Cenozoic non-volcanic sediments. Doleritic sills in limestone.
Boatmans Harbour	34.2 ± 0.4 Ma, 34.3 ± 0.9 Ma	sub-alkaline basalt to basaltic andesite volcaniclastic rocks on underlying Cenozoic non-volcanic sediments, basaltic pillows in the Ototara Limestone matrix with pillow rinds of sideromelane enclosing labradorite and olivine, with clinopyroxene present in the pillow interiors.
Cape Wanbrow	34.2, 36, 38 Ma	Six volcanoes have been defined that erupted over a period of more than 3 million years with overlapping eruptives. Layered sub-alkaline basalt to basaltic andesite volcaniclastic projection into sea. One alkaline basanitic ash horizon. Pillows have interstitial bryozoan limestone.
Enfield	-	sub-alkaline basalt to basaltic andesite crystalline rock on underlying Cenozoic non-volcanic sediments.
Round Hill	33.6 ± 1.8 Ma	sub-alkaline basalt to basaltic andesite crystalline rock surrounded by volcaniclastic rocks on underlying Cenozoic non-volcanic sediments.
Awamoa Creek	-	sub-alkaline basalt to basaltic andesite volcaniclastic rocks on underlying Cenozoic non-volcanic sediments.
Alma	-	sub-alkaline basalt to basaltic andesite. Alma Group is another name for these volcanics in the literature.
Clarks Mill Sill	-	sub-alkaline basalt to basaltic andesite volcaniclastic rocks on underlying Cenozoic non-volcanic sediments. Doleritic sills in limestone.
Trig S, Maheno	34.0 ± 0.6 Ma	sub-alkaline basalt to basaltic andesite.
Kakanui	34.1 ± 0.1 Ma, 33.7 ± 0.3 Ma	alkaline melanephelinite and basanitic clasts crystalline rock on underlying Cenozoic non-volcanic sediments, sideromelane pyroclasts.
Aorere Point, Bridge Point	39.5 ± 1.8 Ma, 34.3 ± 0.5 Ma	sub-alkaline basalt to basaltic andesite, crystalline rock on underlying Cenozoic non-volcanic sediments.
Mount Charles Sill	-	sub-alkaline basalt to basaltic andesite, volcaniclastic rocks on underlying Cenozoic non-volcanic sediments. Olivine dolerite at base overlaid with quartz dolerite. Doleritic sills in mudstone.
Lookout Bluff	8 Ma (Note: This age at Lookout Bluff is of a sample with Dunedin volcanic group characteristics in the middle of older volcanioclastic rock.)	This is from composition characterisation a smaller Dunedin volcanic group later eruption in the middle of an earlier volcaniclastic rock on underlying Cenozoic non-volcanic sediments.
Moeraki Sill	-	sub-alkaline basalt to basaltic andesite, crystalline rocks on underlying Cenozoic non-volcanic sediments. Doleritic sills in siltstone and mudstone. A Porcellanite deposit was quarried by the Māori but note that some deposits may be dykes from Dunedin volcanic group.
Tawhiroko Sill	-	sub-alkaline basalt to basaltic andesite, volcaniclastic rocks on underlying Cenozoic non-volcanic sediments. Olivine dolerite at the base and a pegmatitic quartz dolerite core.

== History ==
The first geological description of volcanics associated with the group was made in 1850 by Dr. Gidon Algernon Mantell in the Quarterly Journal of the Geological Society. This is acknowledged in the first comprehensive geology review of Oamaru district that uses extensively the term "Deborah limestone" with respect to sedimentary strata in relationship to the volcanics.

== See also ==
- Dunedin volcanic group
- Dunedin Volcano
- Banks Peninsula Volcano
