= Banks Peninsula Volcano =

Extinct volcano in Canterbury, New Zealand

- Stratigraphic range
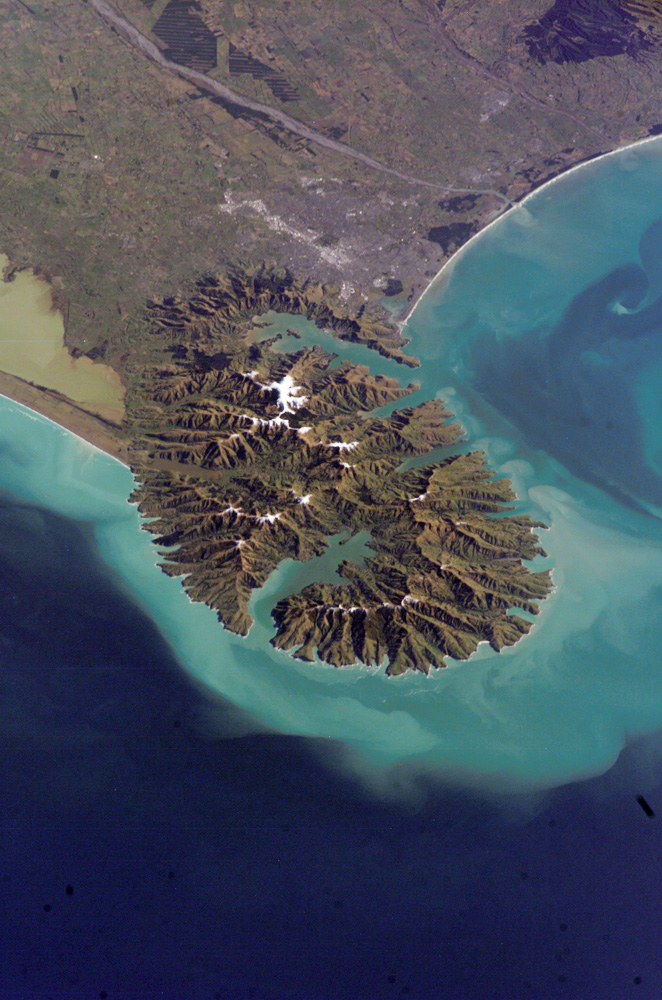
- Banks Peninsula with Akaroa Harbour (West, Lower) and Lyttelton Harbour (East, Upper)
- Type: Volcanic Complex
- Sub-units: Diamond Harbour Volcanic Group, Mount Herbert Volcanic Group, Akaroa Volcanic Group, Lyttelton Volcanic Group
- Overlies: Torlesse composite terrane and Mount Somers Volcanic Group
- Thickness: Originally c.1500m

Lithology
- Primary: Basalt
- Other: Andesite, trachytes and rhyolite

Location
- Coordinates: 43°44′58″S 172°52′10″E
- Volcanic geological map of Banks Peninsula, South Island. Legend: Key for the volcanics that are shown with panning is: basalt (shades of brown/orange); monogenetic basalts; undifferentiated basalts; arc basalts; arc ring basalts; olivine (basalts shades of olive); phonolite (pale salmon); dacite; andesite (shades of red); basaltic andesite; rhyolite, (ignimbrite is lighter shades of violet); plutonic or intusive (gray) - so dolerite/diabase/microgabbro will have shadings towards gray compared to erupted basalt.; Clicking on the rectangle icon enables full window and mouse-over with volcano name/wikilink and ages before present.

The Banks Peninsula Volcano is an extinct volcanic complex to the east of Christchurch on New Zealand's South Island. While the volcano is highly eroded it still forms the majority of Banks Peninsula with a highest point of 919 m (3,015 ft). It is a composite of two main eruptive centres one originating at Lyttelton Harbour, the other at Akaroa Harbour. The eruptions were predominantly basaltic, with associated andesite and trachytes, with minor rhyolite. The volcanic activity occurred in the Late Miocene and possibly extended into the Early Pliocene. There are four volcanic groups, all of which are within the Māui Supergroup. The Christchurch earthquakes led to rumors of a possible eruption, however, there is no known magma chamber beneath the volcano and there has not been any sign of volcanic activity in the last 5 million years.

== Origin and relationship to other volcanoes ==
New Zealand's South Island has many extinct volcanic centres with no obvious tectonic mechanism of formation. Because of this the cause of these intraplate volcanoes is debated. They extend in age from the Cretaceous to the Pliocene and outcrop throughout Otago, Canterbury and on the Chatham Islands. The largest of these is the Banks Peninsula Volcano followed by the Dunedin Volcano which is half its size, but part of a much larger volcanic area, the Dunedin Volcanic Group. Also the Cretaceous Mount Somers volcanics occur throughout Canterbury including Banks Peninsula resulting in adjacent volcanics say near McQueens Valley having very different ages being rhyolites at 98.0 ± 1.2 million years ago and basaltic and trachytic lava flows at 11.59 ± 0.08 million years ago.

These volcanic centres can be dormant for tens of millions of years between eruptions. This implies that the mechanism of formation is connected to the lithosphere unlike some other intraplate volcanoes such as the Hawaii island chain, which are rooted in the asthenosphere. One mechanism for the creation of these volcanoes is the flaking off of the base of Zealandia's lower lithosphere into the asthenosphere. Zealandia has a thin lithosphere as it has been extended while rafting away from Australia. If large sections of this already thin lithosphere sank into the asthenosphere, it would be replaced with hotter rock leading to decompression melting. This theoretically could cause volcanic activity that is locked to the moving lithosphere over many millions of years.

== Geomorphology and structure ==
The shape of the volcano was controlled by a north-west south-east fault system that controlled magma flow. Local extension formed the Lyttelton Volcanic Complex. Erosion has formed streams radially around the volcanic cones and more significant valleys have formed where these radial patterns meet. The erosion and destruction of one wall of these cones has led to an increase in catchment size and associated erosion. Therefore, forming the significant natural harbours of Banks Peninsula. By this mechanism Lyttelton Harbour had started to form by 8.1 Ma. The large mass of resistant volcanic rock that now makes up Banks Peninsula has significantly controlled the shape of the Canterbury Plains.

== Volcanic subunits ==
Volcanic activity started at Lyttelton Harbour (c.11 Ma) then extended through the Mount Herbert Volcanic Group to Akaroa Harbour (c.9 Ma). During the latter phase of the volcano it was simultaneous active from both its major magma chambers, at Akaroa and Lyttelton. The complex geochemically evolved over time and has cyclic eruptive phases. Each progressive cycle has an increase feldspar with time, which created more blocky lava flows due to increased viscosity.

=== Lyttelton Volcanic Group ===
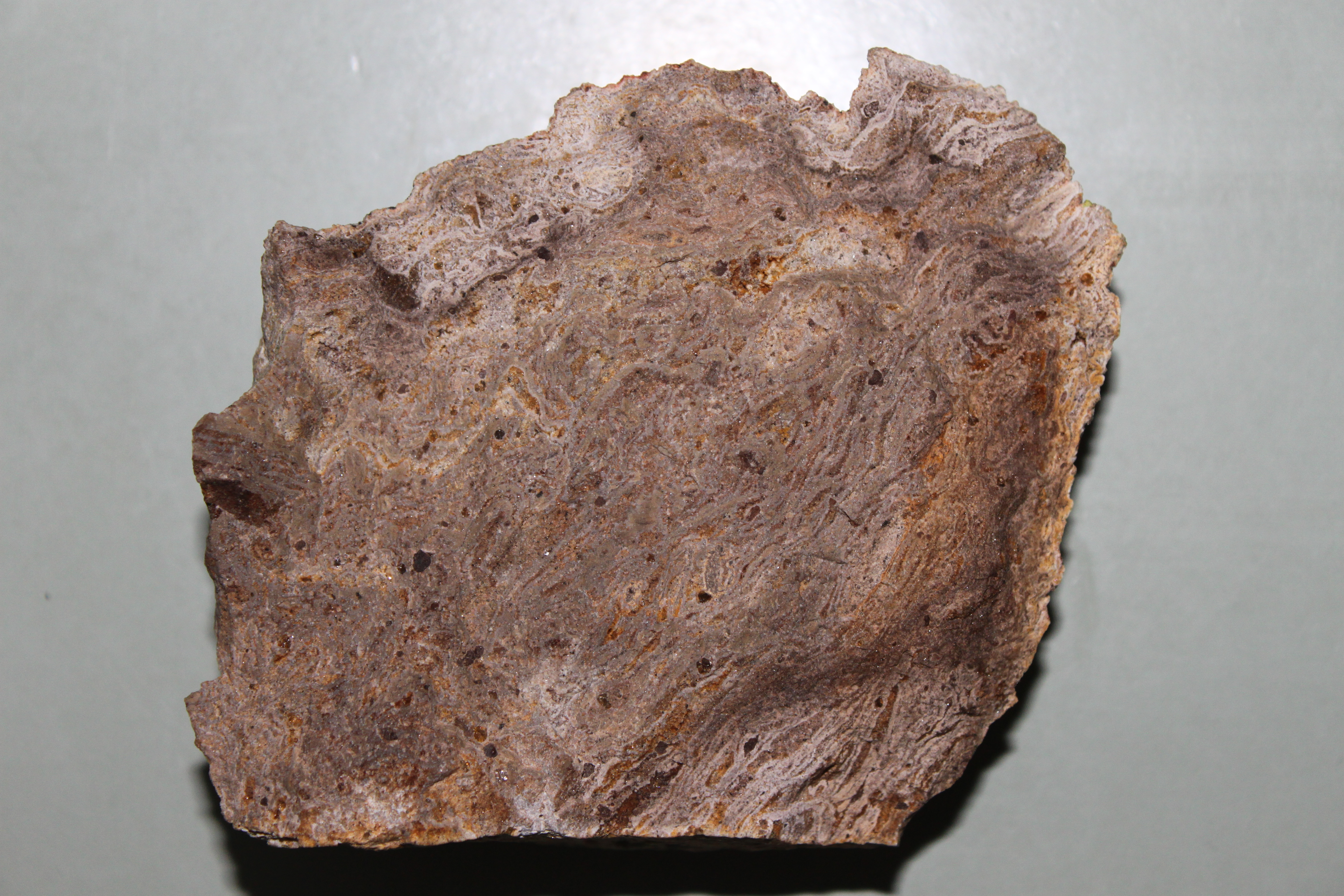
A sample of rhyolite from the Allandale Rhyolite, Lyttelton, New Zealand

The oldest eruptions of the Banks Peninsula occurred between 11–9.7 Ma around the modern town of Lyttelton. These volcanic rocks rest unconformably on Mount Somers Volcanic Group and Rakaia Terrane. The Lyttelton Volcanic Group is primarily basalt and it has been constructed by the formation of five overlapping volcanic cones.

The Allandale Rhyolite is composed of rhyolite and dacite banded flows with rare tuffs and obsidian (10.8 Ma). it is conformably overlain by Governors Bay Andesites in the Lyttelton Harbour area.

=== Mount Herbert Volcanic Group ===
The Mount Herbert Volcanic Group (9.7–8 Ma) represents the movement of volcanic activity towards the east.

=== Akaroa Volcanic Group ===
The Akaroa Volcanic Group (9–8Ma) are basaltic to trachytic lava flows centred on Akaroa Harbour.

=== Diamond Harbour Volcanic Group ===
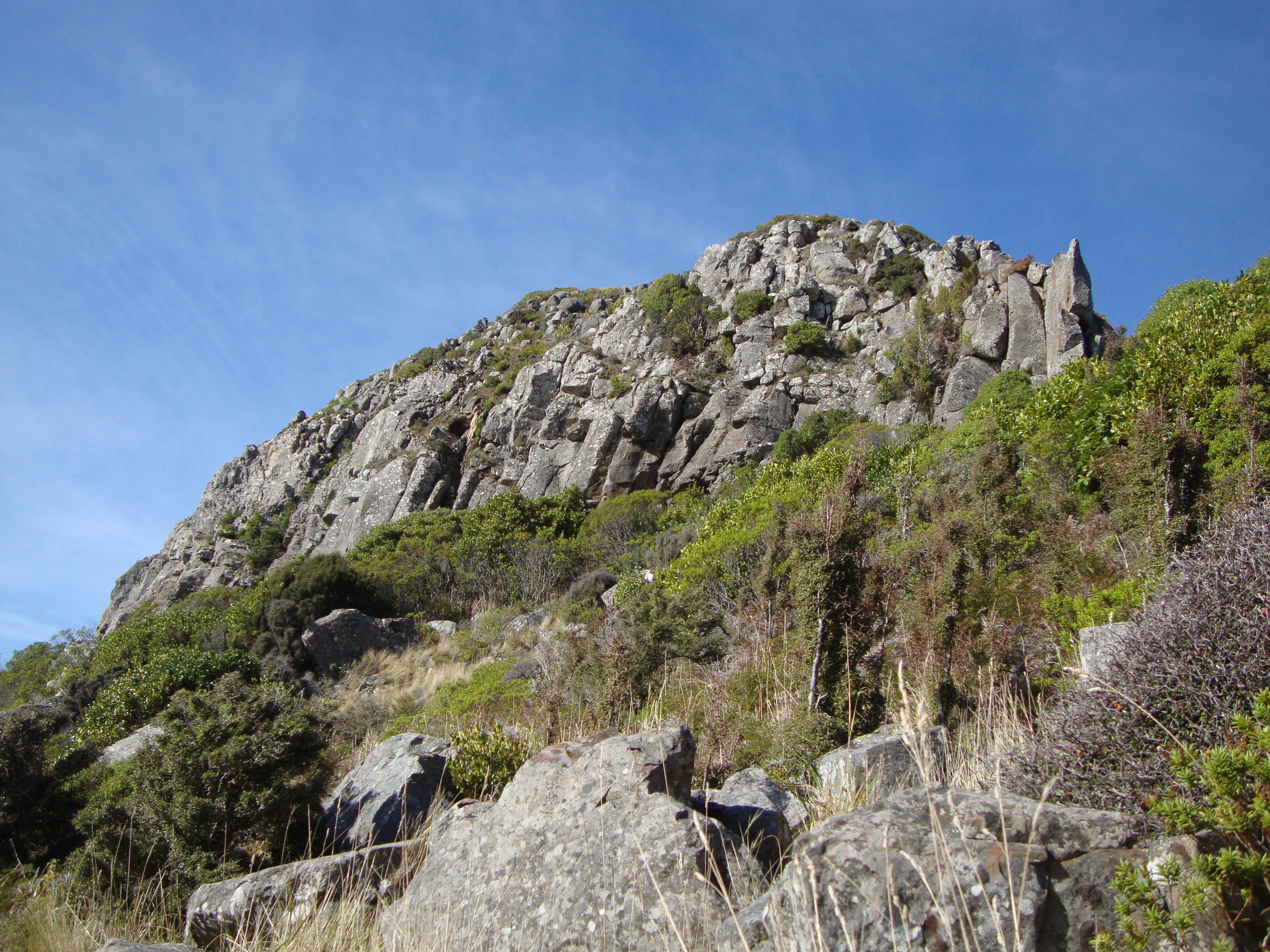
The Monument on Banks Peninsula near Diamond Harbour, with some fresh rockfall from the 2011 Christchurch earthquake.

The Diamond Harbour Volcanic Group represents a return of volcanic activity to the western side of the peninsula (7–5.8Ma). The group is mostly made up of basalt, with rare interbedded carbonaceous mud.

== See also ==
- List of rock formations of New Zealand
- List of volcanoes in New Zealand
- Stratigraphy of New Zealand
- South Island surface volcanism
- Volcanology of New Zealand
- Tombolo (coastline landform)
