= Dunedin volcanic group =

Extinct volcanic area in South Island, New Zealand

- Stratigraphic range: Oligocene-Miocene (25–8 Ma)
- Type: Igneous
- Overlies: Rakaia Terrane
- Area: 7,800 square kilometres (3,000 sq mi)

Lithology
- Primary: Basalt, trachyte, phonolite and breccia

Location
- Coordinates: 45.65°S 170.3°E
- Region: Otago
- Country: New Zealand

Type section
- Named for: Dunedin
- Map of selected surface volcanic features of the South Island centred on Otago. Legend: Key for the volcanics that are shown with panning is: basalt (shades of brown/orange); monogenetic basalts; undifferentiated basalts; arc basalts; arc ring basalts; olivine (basalts shades of olive); phonolite (pale salmon); dacite; andesite (shades of red); basaltic andesite; rhyolite, (ignimbrite is lighter shades of violet); plutonic or intusive (gray) - so dolerite/diabase/microgabbro will have shadings towards gray compared to erupted basalt.; Clicking on the rectangle icon enables full window and mouse-over with volcano name/wikilink and ages before present.

The Dunedin volcanic group is a volcanic group that covers over 7,800 km^{2} (3,000 sq mi) of Otago in the South Island of New Zealand. It is a recent (Note: The term Dunedin Volcanic Group was used in independent academic literature since at least the mid-90s, being first defined as Miocene Otago volcanics near Dunedin excluding the Dunedin Volcano in 1986. However, such use was outside the then-current volcanic classification methodologies, which changed subsequently. Its current meaning builds on works such as that of Coombs. and Németh. The formal recommendation to adopt the term came in 2020 as a result of a peer-reviewed reanalysis exercise of over a century of Otago geological specimens.) reclassification of the group previously known as the Waiareka-Deborah volcanic field due to common magma melt ancestries of the Dunedin Volcano with the overlapping alkali basaltic monogenetic volcanic field. Excluded from the group are a group of volcanics of different composition (sub-alkaline basalt to basaltic andesite) and older age (36.4 to 27.6 million years ago) near Oamaru, which have been given the name previously used for the Dunedin group. The older Waiareka-Deborah volcanic field overlaps the new Dunedin volcanic group geographically; though Dunedin Volcano has been well studied from the 1880s since New Zealand's first school of geology was established at the University of Otago, detailed studies of north-central volcanoes such as the Crater near Middlemarch were done much later, and high-quality composition studies still need to be done to properly classify many volcanics near Oamaru.

== Geography ==
The volcanic features of the Dunedin group define the city and harbour of Dunedin. Multiple monogenetic basalt volcanoes alter the mainly sedimentary Otago landscape. An eruptive centre provides access to the fossil site of Foulden Maar. The northernmost eruptive centre is at Arnmore, near Ngapara, and the group extends south to near Kaitangata 160 km (99 mi) away. While the easternmost on-land occurrence is at Lookout Bluff in north Otago, seismic data provides evidence of offshore underwater centres. Haughton Hill in the Maniototo is the most northwestern eruptive centre.

== Geology ==
Over 150 flows, or eruptive centres, are known, and these are mainly of small volume alkaline basanite eruptives. The Dunedin volcanic group shows continued evidence of a magma melt hot spot centred near Portobello on the Otago Peninsula that has presumably been accumulating in the last 10 million years since active volcanism ceased. This is because of high surface helium isotope measurements, consistent with a magma pocket.

In this region of Otago, there is a metamorphosed belt known as the Otago Schist that formed as part of the Zealandia continent, dated from the Jurassic through the Cretaceous period. In this belt, Oligocene to Miocene aged volcanic group basement rocks including pumpellyite and actinolite greyschist have erupted through the upper and lower greenschist belts, which are present from Wānaka down to Dunedin. The Otago Schist is overlain by a sedimentary sequence, deposited from Late Cretaceous to Miocene time. The peak of marine transgression is marked by an Oligocene carbonate platform that means there was at this time near-total submergence under water. This was later followed by late Oligocene faulting that lifted the area of Otago above sea level.

Studies of the volcanic group were previously limited as the ages of the volcanoes were not known well; now the distribution of ages from 25 million to approximately 9 million years ago is better understood by location. The oldest rocks in the group trend towards the west. The Crater, a volcano near Middlemarch, is the high-level vent diatreme facies of an approximately 1.5 km (0.93 mi) wide maar and has an age of 24.8 ± 0.6 Ma for its oldest component. The oldest eruptions of the Dunedin Volcano are likely to have been near Allans Beach on the Otago Peninsula at 16.0 ± 0.4 Ma. The age of Mount Cargill is measured at 11 Ma. About two-thirds of the eruptions in the entire group took place in the period between 16 and 11 Ma, which includes all of the Dunedin Volcano eruptions as well. The youngest rocks, at Lookout Bluff, may be as recent as 8 Ma, though measurements in this area are considered provisional.

The local basaltic monogenetic volcanoes were historically arbitrarily separated from the Dunedin Volcano, as has been determined by subsequent rock analysis. The associated Dunedin volcanic group basalts are likely derived from several subtly different but related isotopic reservoirs. Other long-standing knowledge, such as the occurrence of rhönite, a very rare mineral, with the minerals phonolite and trachyte in the Dunedin Volcano, confused matters until international collaboration with detailed analysis of samples from the whole group area was possible. The central vent at Port Chalmers, which is likely a large diatreme, is filled with breccia in an oval about 1.3 by 2.5 km. The vent contains volcanic clasts of mainly phonolite, with minor proportions of basanite, basaltic-trachyandesite, trachyandesite, syenite, gabbro, pyroxenite, and hornblendite, as well as fragments of Otago Schist and Cenozoic sedimentary rocks. Within the Dunedin Volcano area at Hoopers Inlet are nepheline syenite plutonic dykes; however, there are no other plutonic rocks in the group area.

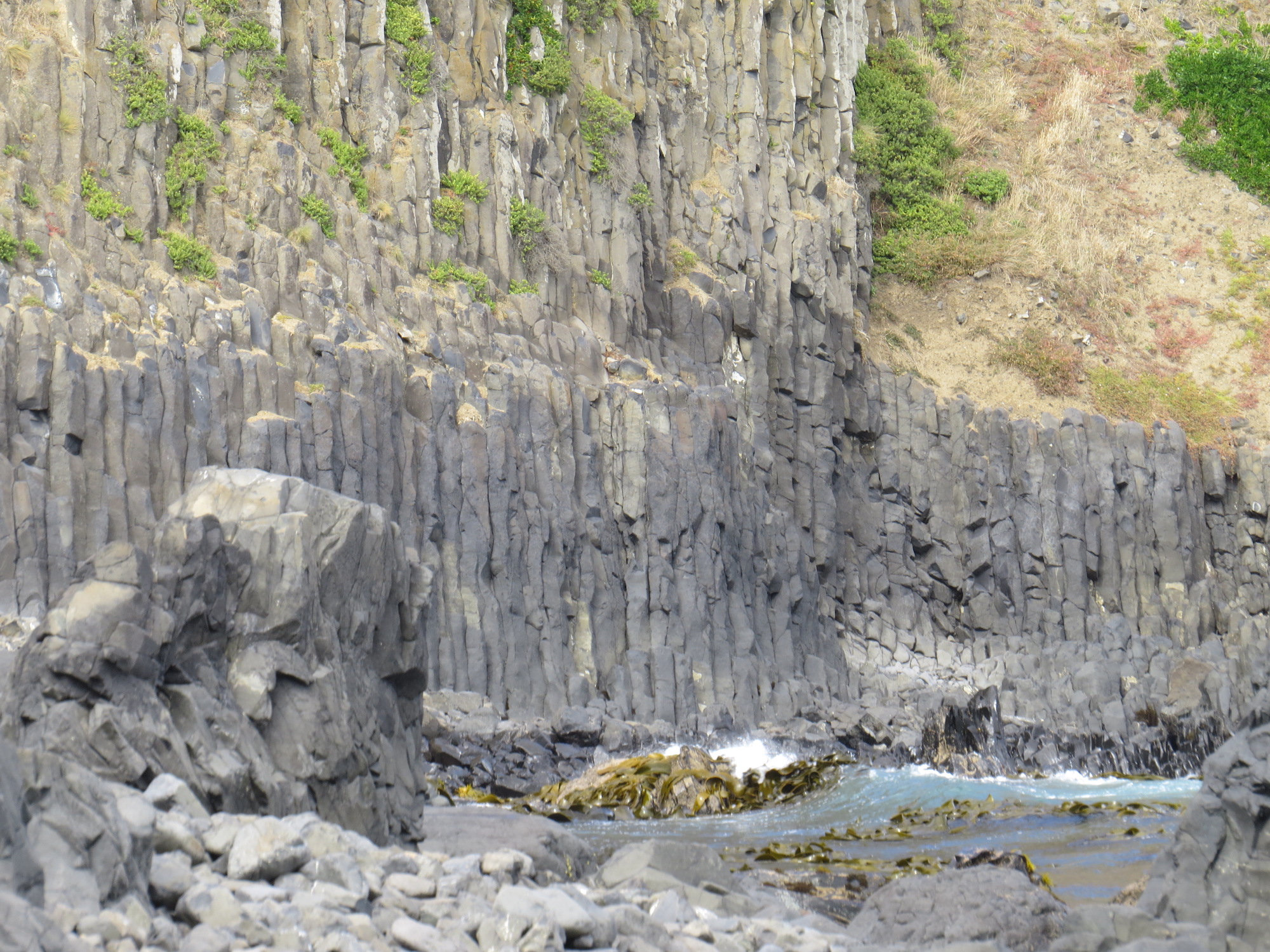
Columnar basalt at Blackhead, 10km south of Dunedin city centre. Basaltic columns can also be seen at St. Clair's Second Beach and on the slopes of Mount Cargill.

Scoria, tuff and basanite overlie Eocene-Oligocene marine sediments in the northwest Yellow Hill-Summer Hills area. Ram Rock, an eroded basanitic pipe to the northeast of this area, is associated with peridotite and pyrometamorphosed Otago Schist xenoliths.

The Swinburn area to the south side of State Highway 85 has coarse doleritic textured basaltic volcanics overlying scoria-fall deposits, which in turn overlie Eocene-Oligocene marine sediments. The basalt contains rare xenoliths of peridotite, schist and porcellanitised Cenozoic sediment. North of State Highway 85, thin aphanitic basanitic lavas overlie Miocene sediments. These particular lavas have all been tilted and now mostly dip to the north and north-east.

In the Pigroot area at the volcano called Trig L, lavas overlie marine sediments and include exotic mantle peridotite and crustal gabbro xenolith-bearing phonolite as the cap.

The main eruptive centre in the northwestern area of the Kakanui Range in north Otago is Siberia Hill, with a basanite cap on top of trachybasalt covering a 40 m (130 ft) layer of Eocene to Oligocene sediments above the Otago Schist. Kattothyrst, about 1 km (0.62 mi) to its east, is a columnar-jointed basanitic plug. Mount Dasher, about 1.5 km (0.93 mi) to the northwest of Kattothyrst, has basanite lavas with an intervening phonotephrite flow on the northeast side. The Obelisk has a south end of trachybasalt and basalt at the northern end.

Just southwest of Dunedin, the Saddle Hill, Jaffray Hill, and Scroggs Hill volcanoes are composed of tuff, basaltic trachyandesite, phonotephrite and basanite lava, emplaced through coal-bearing sediments and Cenozoic mudstone. Basanite is dominant on Saddle Hill, and phonolitic pyroclastic rock underlies the lava at Scroggs Hill. A historic underground coal mine is reported to have encountered the feeder pipe at Jaffray Hill. Further to the southwest are volcanoes on the western side of Lake Waihola, with at least three vents present. Olivine theralite (nepheline gabbro), clinopyroxenite and peridotite have also been found on this western shore.

=== Relationship to other volcanoes ===
New Zealand's South Island has many extinct volcanic centres without agreed upon tectonic mechanisms of formation. They extend in age from the Cretaceous to the Pliocene and outcrop throughout Otago, Canterbury, and on the Chatham Islands. The largest single eruptive centre in the South Island is the Banks Peninsula Volcano, followed by the Dunedin Volcano. Despite being smaller, the Dunedin volcanic group contains a much larger monogenetic volcanic field of related eruptives than the Banks Peninsula Volcano.

These volcanic centres can be dormant for tens of millions of years between eruptions. This implies that the mechanism of formation may be connected to the lithosphere, unlike some other intraplate volcanoes such as the Hawaii island chain, which are rooted in the asthenosphere. One possible mechanism for the creation of these volcanoes is the flaking off of the base of Zealandia's lower lithosphere into the asthenosphere. Zealandia has a thin lithosphere, as it has been extended while rafting away from Australia. If large sections of this already thin lithosphere sank into the asthenosphere, it would be replaced with hotter rock leading to decompression melting. This theoretically could cause volcanic activity that is locked to the moving lithosphere over many millions of years, as observed in the Dunedin group.

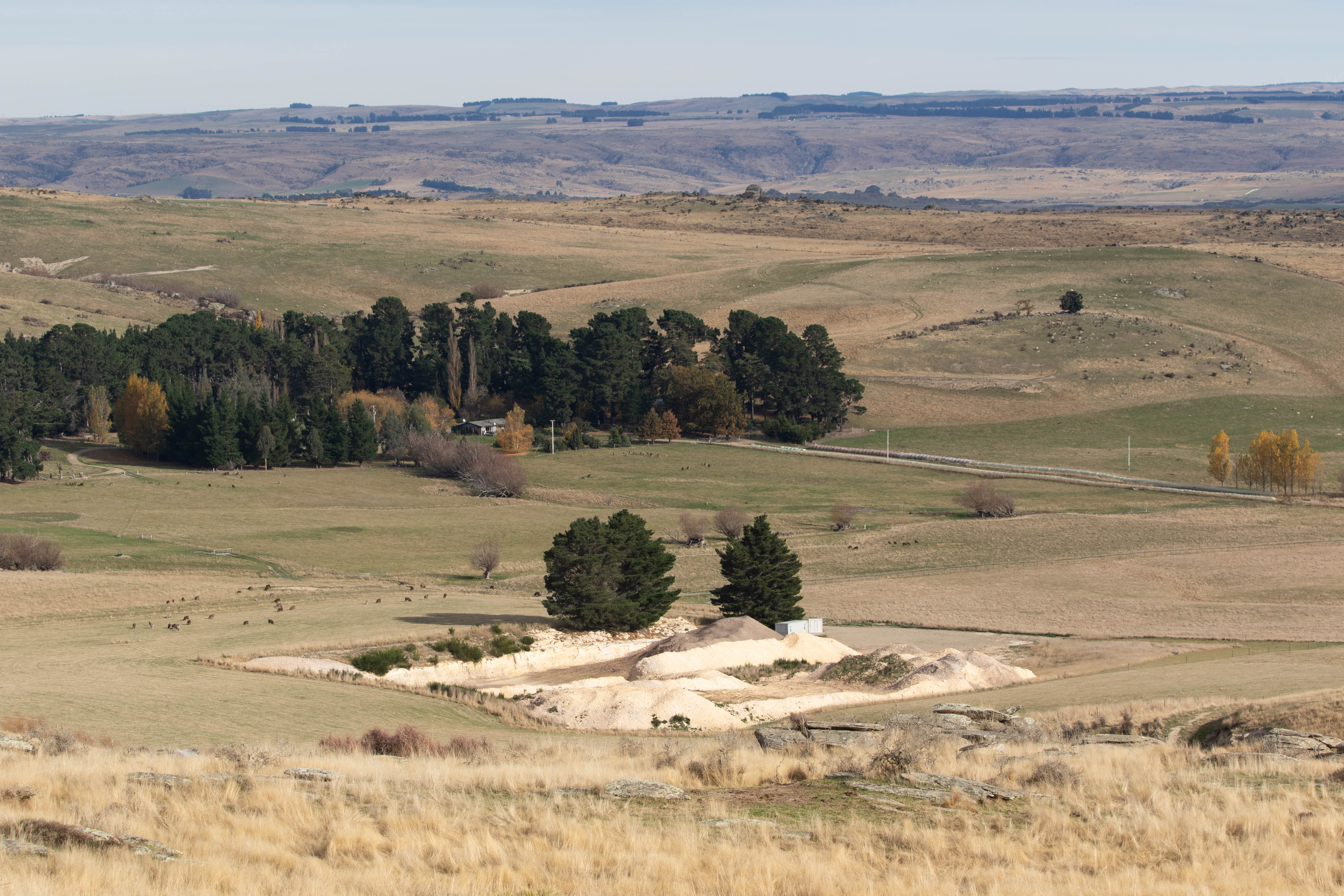
Central Otago landscape with Foulden Maar in the foreground and distant landscape modified by other volcanic rocks

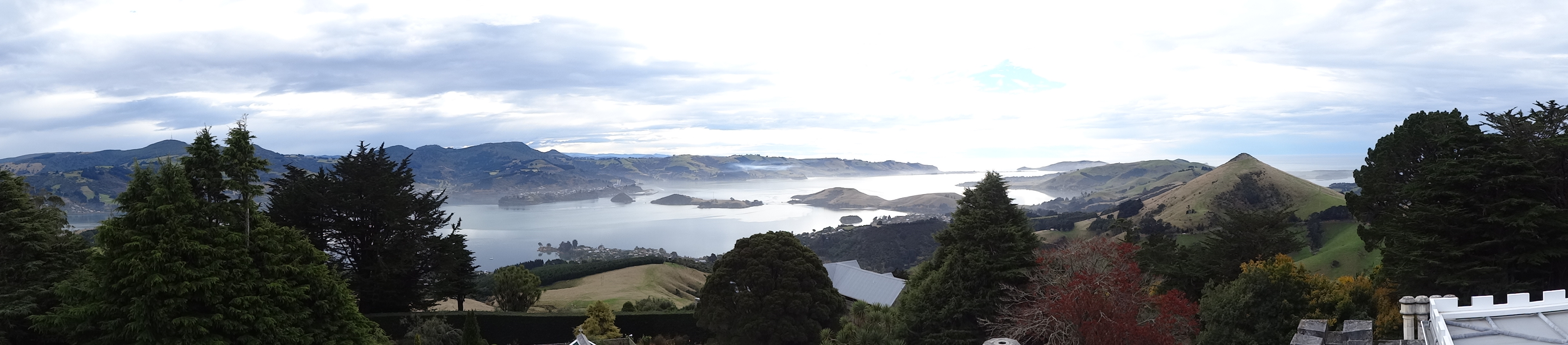
The most active part of the Dunedin volcanic group was originally centred on Quarantine Island (centre of the image).

== See also ==
- Dunedin Volcano
- Banks Peninsula Volcano
