= Dunedin Volcano =

Extinct volcano in Otago, New Zealand

- Stratigraphic range: Miocene (16–10 Ma )
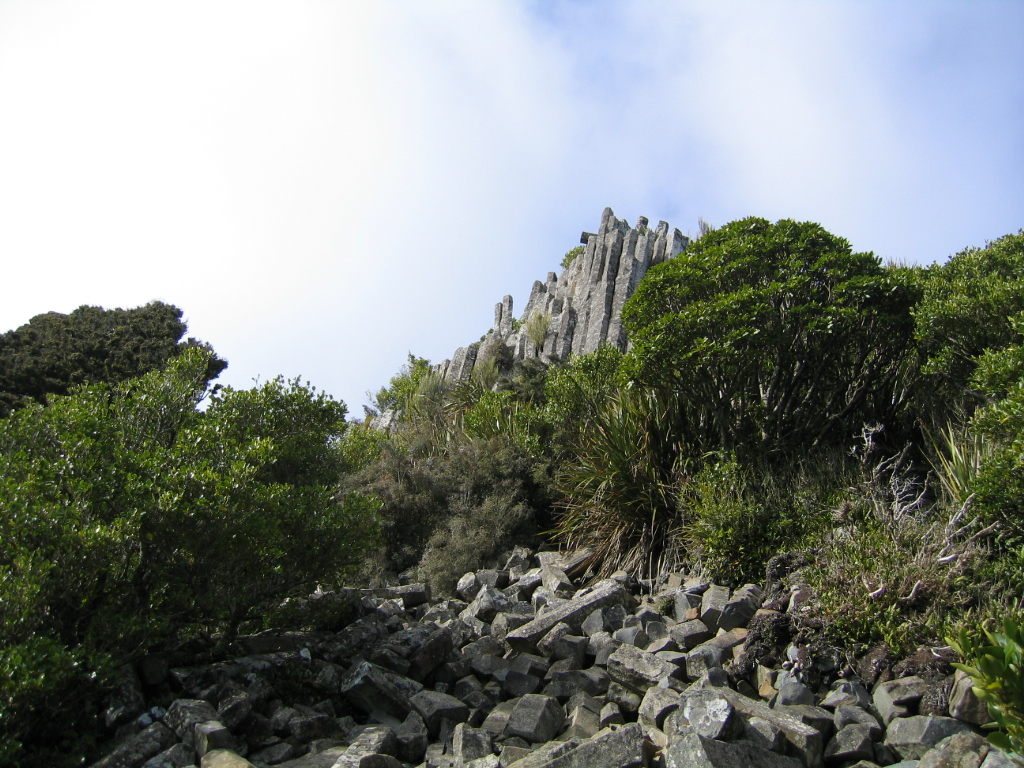
- Basaltic columnar crystals in the "Organ pipes" formation
- Type: Igneous
- Overlies: Waipuna Bay Formation

Lithology
- Primary: Basalt, trachyte, phonolite and breccia

Location
- Coordinates: 45.848°S 170.636°E
- Region: Otago
- Country: New Zealand

Type section
- Named for: Dunedin
- Map of selected surface volcanic features of the South Island centred on the Otago Peninsula. Legend: Key for the volcanics that are shown with panning is: basalt (shades of brown/orange); monogenetic basalts; undifferentiated basalts; arc basalts; arc ring basalts; olivine (basalts shades of olive); phonolite (pale salmon); dacite; andesite (shades of red); basaltic andesite; rhyolite, (ignimbrite is lighter shades of violet); plutonic or intusive (gray) - so dolerite/diabase/microgabbro will have shadings towards gray compared to erupted basalt.; Clicking on the rectangle icon enables full window and mouse-over with volcano name/wikilink and ages before present.

The Dunedin Volcano is an extensively eroded multi-vent shield volcano that was active between 16 and 10 million years ago. It originally extended from the modern city of Dunedin, New Zealand, to Aramoana, about 25 km (16 mi) away. Extensive erosion has occurred over the last 10 million years, and Otago Harbour now fills the oldest parts of the volcano. The remnants of the volcano form the hills around Otago Harbour (including Mount Cargill, Flagstaff, Saddle Hill, Signal Hill, and Otago Peninsula).

== Geology ==
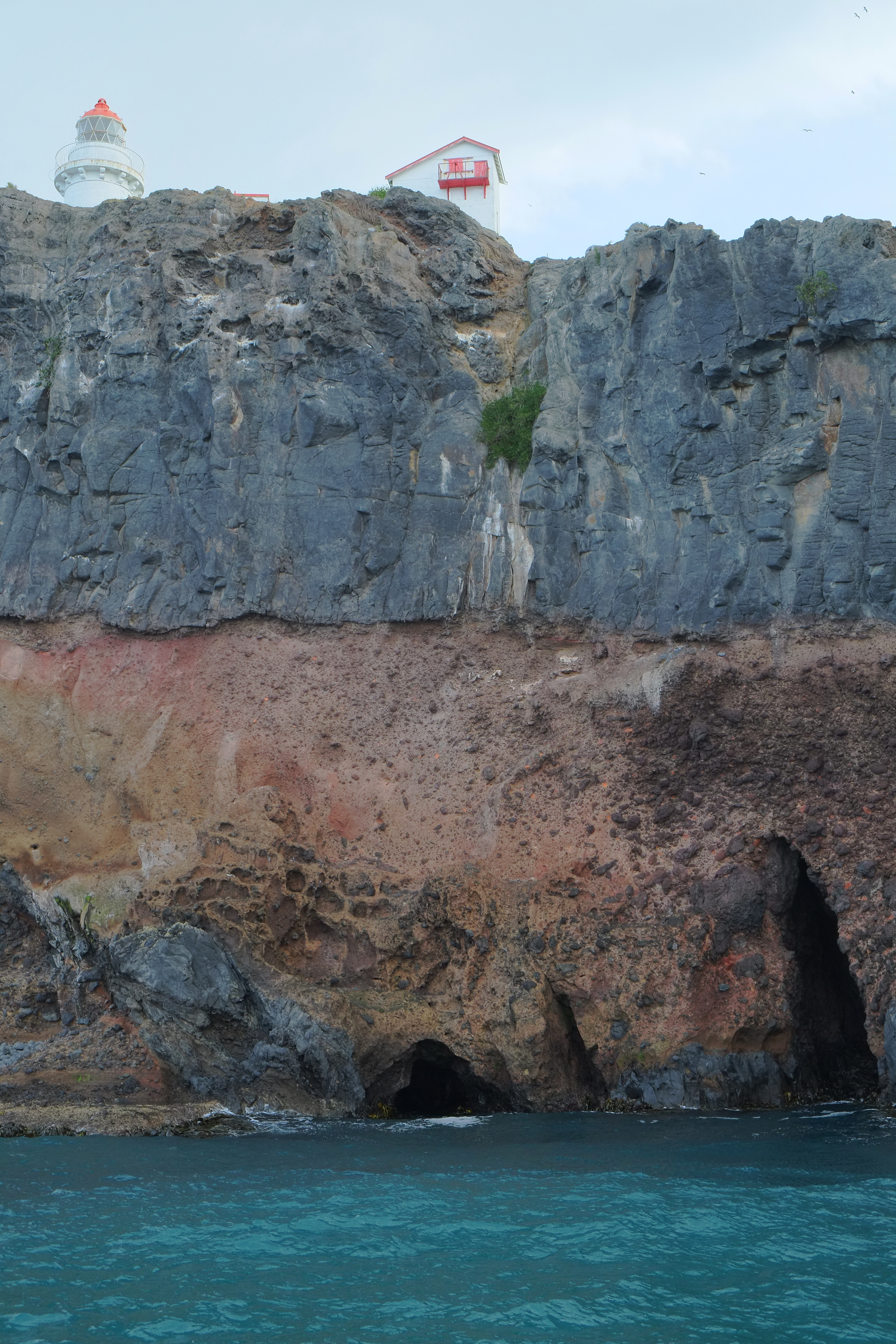
A layer of scoria covered by a basalt lava flow at Taiaroa Head

Volcanism began in a shallow marine environment. The volcano became larger with flows of basalt and minor trachyte creating the bulk of the volcano. The total volume of eruptives has been estimated to be 150 km^{3} (36 cu mi), but there was a much larger intrusive component at 600 km^{3} (140 cu mi). The final phase of eruptions are preserved as phonolite domes around Mount Cargill.

Traces of the old Dunedin Volcano are best seen in the Dunedin Botanic Garden's geology walk, the cliffs at Aramoana, and the geomorphology of Mount Cargill, which has preserved lava domes. Basaltic columns are also to be found as prominent features above Second Beach at St Clair and at Blackhead.

This Dunedin Volcano Animation shows various locations around Dunedin with information on age of the rocks and general evolution of the Dunedin Volcano and more distant volcanism.

=== Origin and relationship to other volcanoes ===
New Zealand's South Island has many extinct volcanic centres with no yet fully agreed tectonic mechanism of formation; the Dunedin volcano is one of them. They extend in age from the Cretaceous to the Pliocene and outcrop throughout Otago, Canterbury, and the Chatham Islands. The largest single eruptive centre is the Banks Peninsula Volcano followed by the Dunedin Volcano, which is half its size, but is part of a much larger volcanic area, the Dunedin volcanic group. The relationship in terms of age and magma melts within the Dunedin volcanic group has caused some revision of previous models as part of a larger synthesis that remains incomplete, as it requires reanalysis and new analysis of many volcanics, as well as better information from off-land studies. A model consistent with current evidence is that there has been intermittent melting of a middle lithospheric mantle with metasomatism by hydrous asthenosphere-derived melts.

These volcanic centres can be dormant for tens of millions of years between eruptions. This implies that the mechanism of formation may be connected to the lithosphere, unlike some other intraplate volcanoes such as the Hawaii island chain, which are rooted in the asthenosphere. One possible mechanism for the creation of these volcanoes is the flaking-off of the base of Zealandia's lower lithosphere into the asthenosphere. Zealandia has a thin lithosphere as it has been extended while rafting away from Australia. If large sections of this already-thin lithosphere sank into the asthenosphere, it would be replaced with hotter rock leading to decompression melting. This theoretically could cause volcanic activity that is locked to the moving lithosphere over many millions of years.

=== Risk potential ===
The Dunedin Volcano has the distinction amongst the South Island volcanics of having a potential magma melt pool still underneath it, as backed up by heat-flow and surface-helium measurements. Accordingly there may now be a gradually re-accumulating 10-million-year melt which could, with a low risk of it happening, in due course become manifest as active surface volcanism again.

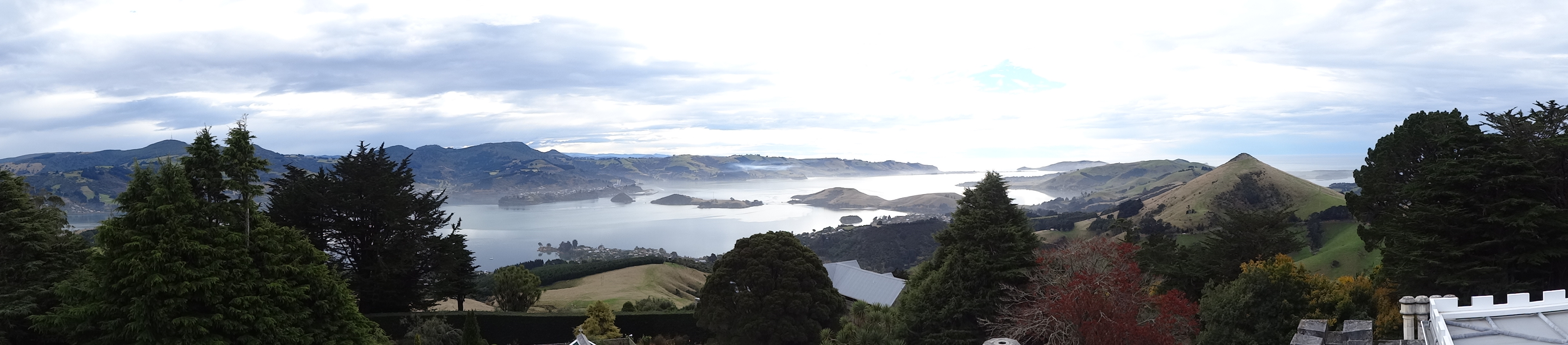
The Dunedin Volcano was originally centred on Quarantine Island (centre of the image) and is now highly eroded. There is speculation that it may have been up to 1,000 m (3,300 ft) high. It is still close to the centre of the present magma hot spot underneath Portobello.

.

== See also ==
- Dunedin volcanic group
- Banks Peninsula Volcano
