= Lake Disappear =

Intermittent volcanogenic lake in New Zealand

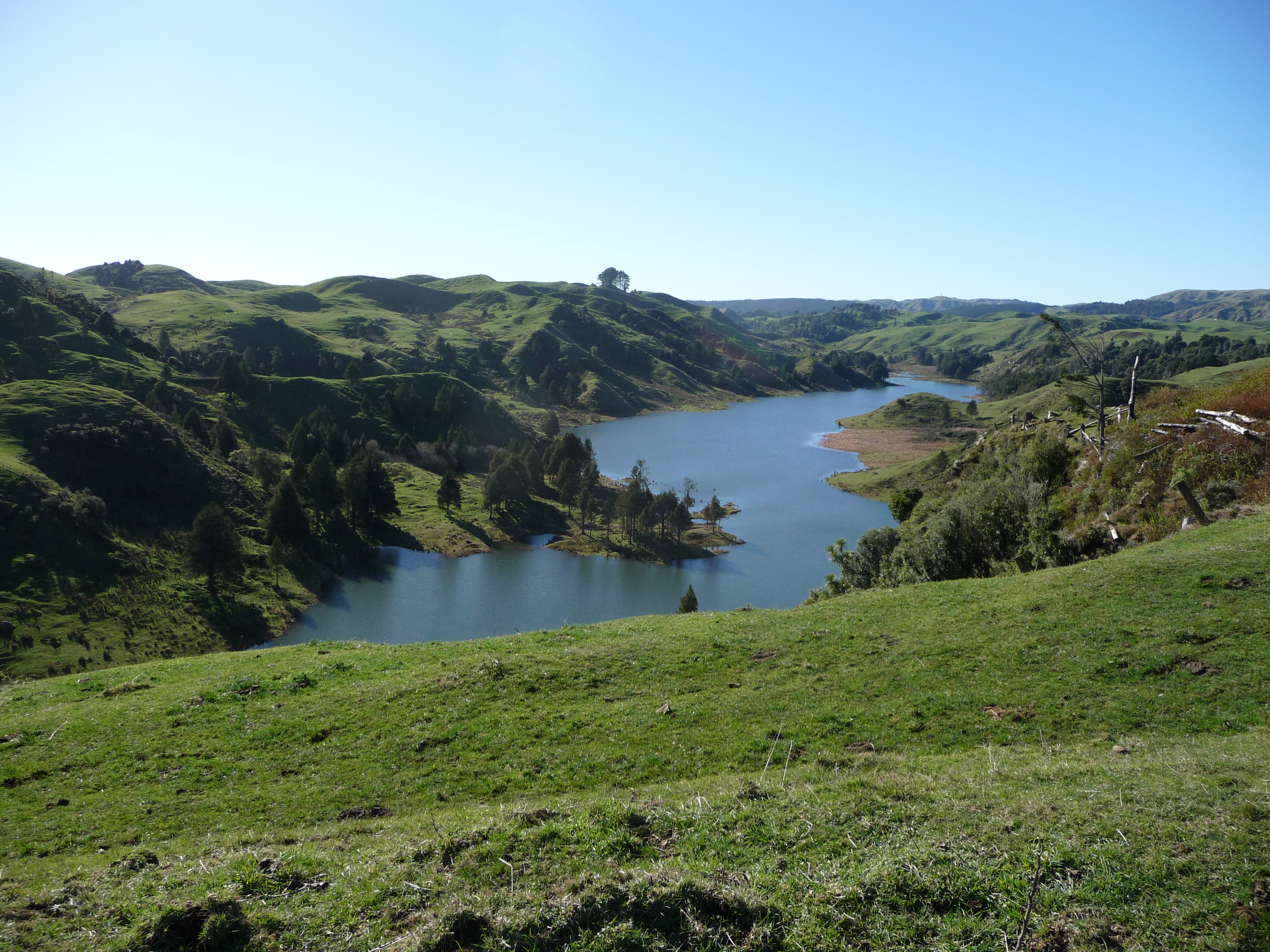
- Lake Disappear when full viewed from Kawhia Rd (July 2008)

- Lake Disappear is in the Waikato region of the North Island.
- Location: Waikato District, Waikato region, North Island
- Coordinates: 37.926191°S 174.916549°E
- Lake type: Intermittent
- Primary inflows: Pakihi Stream
- Primary outflows: Sinkhole
- Catchment area: 7 km^{2} (2.7 sq mi)
- Basin countries: New Zealand
- Max. length: 2 km (1.2 mi)
- Average depth: Up to 15 m (49 ft)
- Surface elevation: 170 m (560 ft)

Lake Disappear is an intermittent volcanogenic lake situated in the North Island of New Zealand, just over 20 kilometres (12 mi) from Raglan, 4 kilometres (2.5 mi) beyond Bridal Veil waterfall. It has also been described as a solution lake. The south end can be seen from Kawhia Rd and, when the north end is full, it can be seen from the end of Plateau Rd on the Pipiwharauroa Way. It is the largest known polje in the country.

== Lake formation, volcanism and limestone ==
Lake Disappear lies in a valley dammed by a lava flow (similar to the one which also formed Bridal Veil waterfall - see map below) and drained through a limestone sinkhole. The lava flow, which covered the limestone, was part of the Okete Volcanics about 2 million years ago, coming from a vent on Whataipu (see map), just over a kilometre away. Page 43 of the 'Geology of the Raglan-Kawhia Area' says, “Only a few specific areas within the larger catchments are prone to flooding where river flow is restricted, most notably at Lake Disappear (R15/795635 [now on Topo maps BD32 & BE32]) Here, the Pakoka River [should be Pakihi – Pakoka is the next valley with Bridal Veil fall] drains underground through limestone (Elgood Limestone). During times of prolonged heavy rain, water backs up behind the outlet to form a sizable lake over what are normally dry alluvial flats.”

Elgood Limestone (an outcrop is in the photo - see Gallery - to the left) is part of the Glen Massey Formation. The geology guide describes it as, “forming prominent bluffs or surface outcrops displaying solution channels, lapiez, and sinkholes, and is everywhere a light grey, flaggy limestone containing up to 95% CaCO_{3}. Glauconite is common throughout, together with Mesozoic pebbles and greensand near the base”. About its late Whaingaroan (about 27 million years ago) creation, it says, “The change from estuarine, shallow brackish water conditions (Mangakotuku Formation), to fully marine, open sea, aerobic conditions (Glen Massey Formation) is evidenced by near shore accumulation of the bioclastic Elgood Limestone, onlap of the succeeding Dunphail Siltstone, and subsequent deposition of Ahirau Sandstone in an inner to mid shelf environment.”

== Biota ==
Pakihi is a Māori term now commonly used to describe poorly drained, infertile land. Much of the watershed of Lake Disappear was podocarp forest but is now mostly sheep and beef farms, with Te Uku Wind Farm around the source. A 1999 survey reported the lake-bed as dominated by adventive pasture species, with some indigenous sedges, and a remnant of secondary kahikatea forest.

A survey for the windfarm described the Pakihi, 2 kilometres (1.2 mi) up from the Lake (site PR2), as having poor to moderate ecological health, indicated by significant growths of long-green filamentous algae. Landcare Research says, “Enrichment of the water with nutrients causes algal blooms, and changes the algal community from a slow-growing, diverse mixture into one dominated by problem algae like thick filamentous mats”. Inanga, longfin eel, koura (freshwater crayfish), freshwater snails, shrimps and banded kokopu have been found in the stream and Kaoro climbing galaxias (Galaxias brevipinnis) may be present. A January 2008 survey identified these indicators of stream quality as being present (the numbers on the left are the MCI Score - the higher the score, the more sensitive these macroinvertebrates are to pollution. The words on the right show how common or rare they were in the Pakihi) -

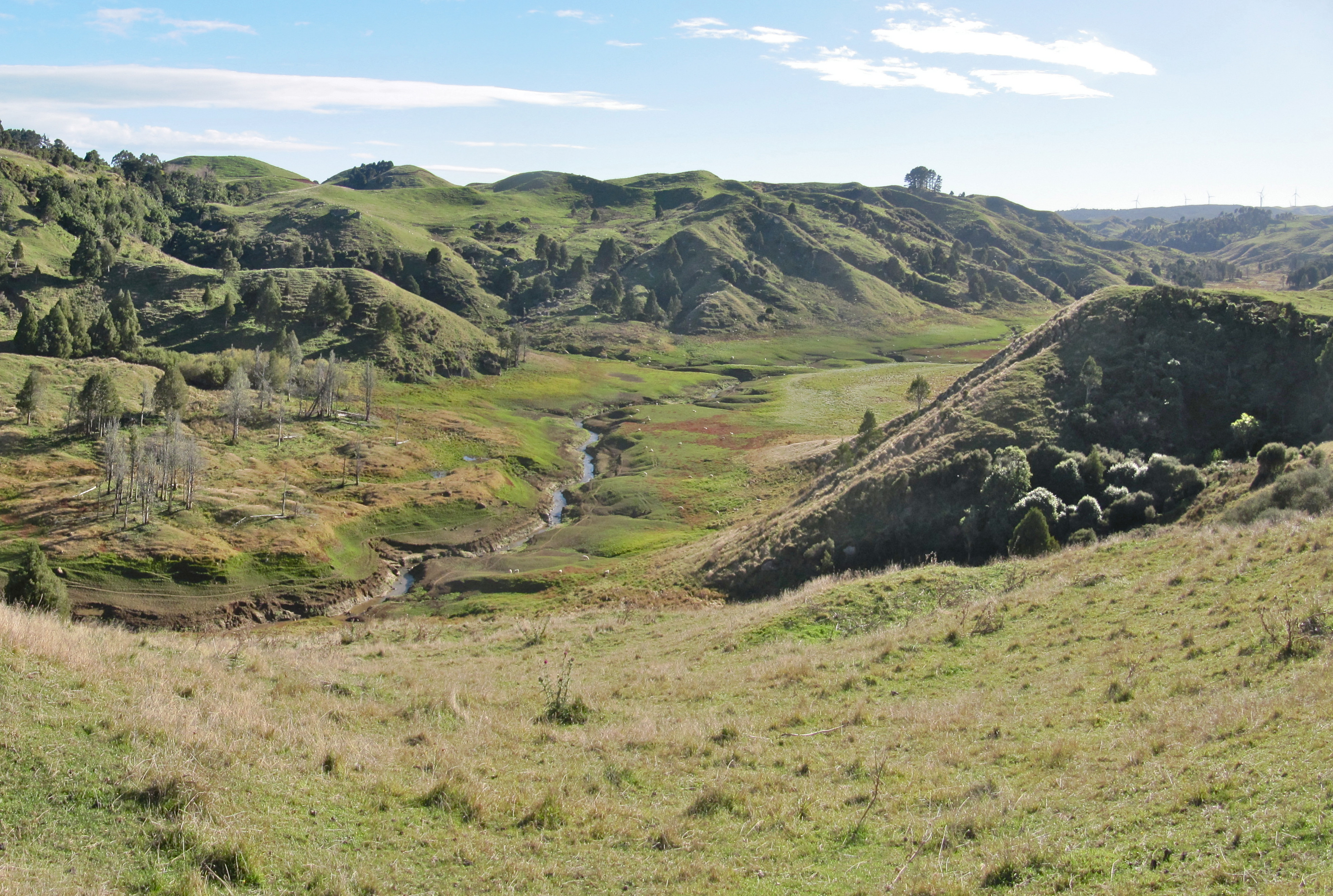
Empty Lake Disappear - compare with full lake in photo above.

(9) Caddisfly Olinga feredayi

(9) spiny-gilled mayfly Coloburiscus humeralis occasional

(8) mayfly Deleatidium occasional

(7) double-gilled mayfly Zephlebia occasional

(7) caddisfly Rhyacophilidae abundant

(7) dobsonfly Archichauliodes diversus common

(6) riffle beetle Elmidae 6 occasional

(5) stony-cased caddisfly Pycnocentrodes common

(5) Crustacea Paratya curvirostris occasional

(4) mud snail Potamopyrgus antipodarum common

(3) sand fly Austrosimulium occasional

(3) New Zealand freshwater mussel Hyridella rare

== See also ==
- List of lakes in New Zealand
- Bullock Creek (New Zealand) § The polje
- Turlough (lake)

== Gallery ==
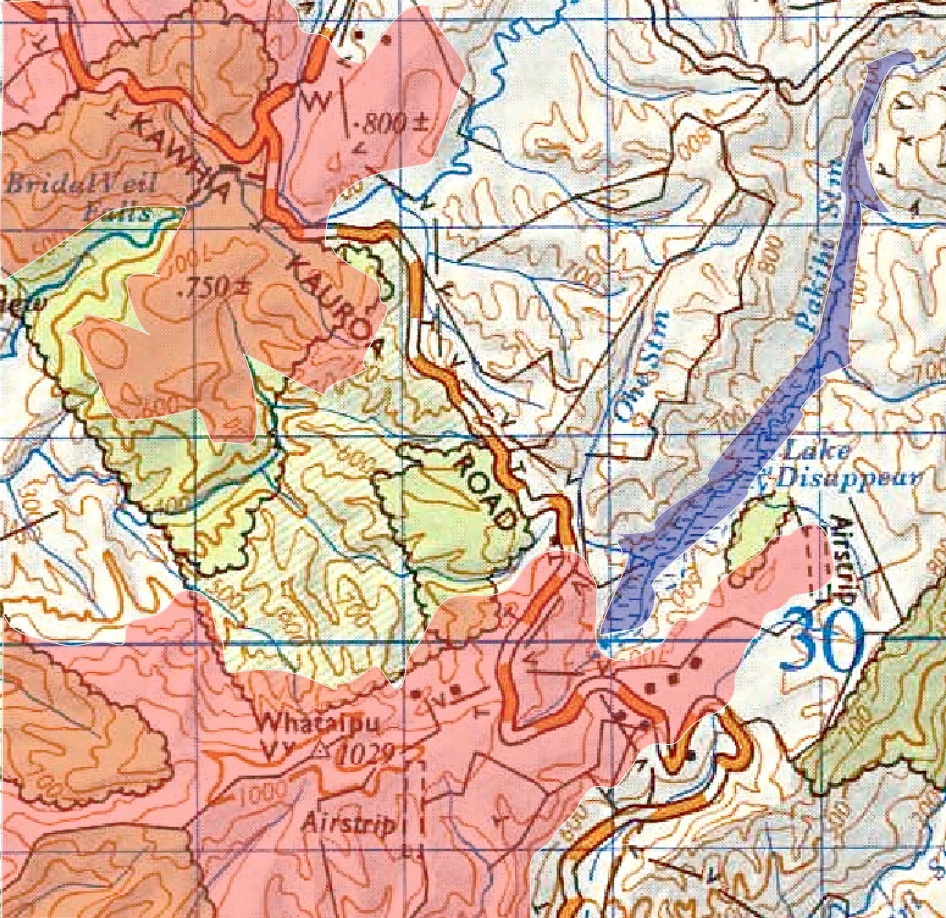
Approximate maximum extent of Lake Disappear in blue, extent of Okete Volcanics in pink. The sinkhole is in the southwest corner of the lake. The stream re-emerges due south, near the foot of the map, disappears for another 200 metres (660 ft), then joins Te Maari Stream and runs into Aotea Harbour. Diagram based on the 1971 one inch (contours in feet) and 1994 GNS 1:50,000 maps - sourced from LINZ.

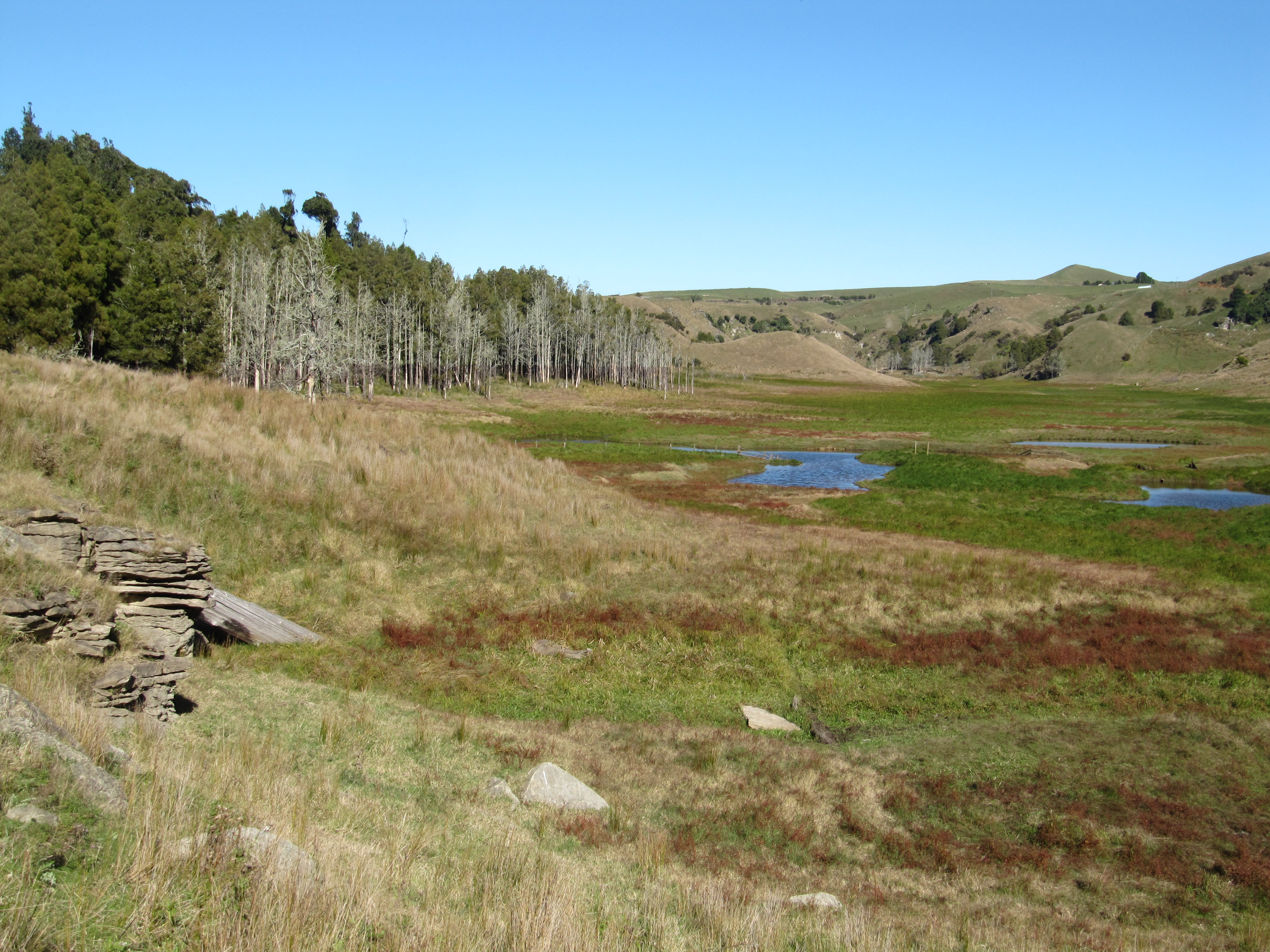
The lava flow which blocked the Pakihi Valley is in the background.

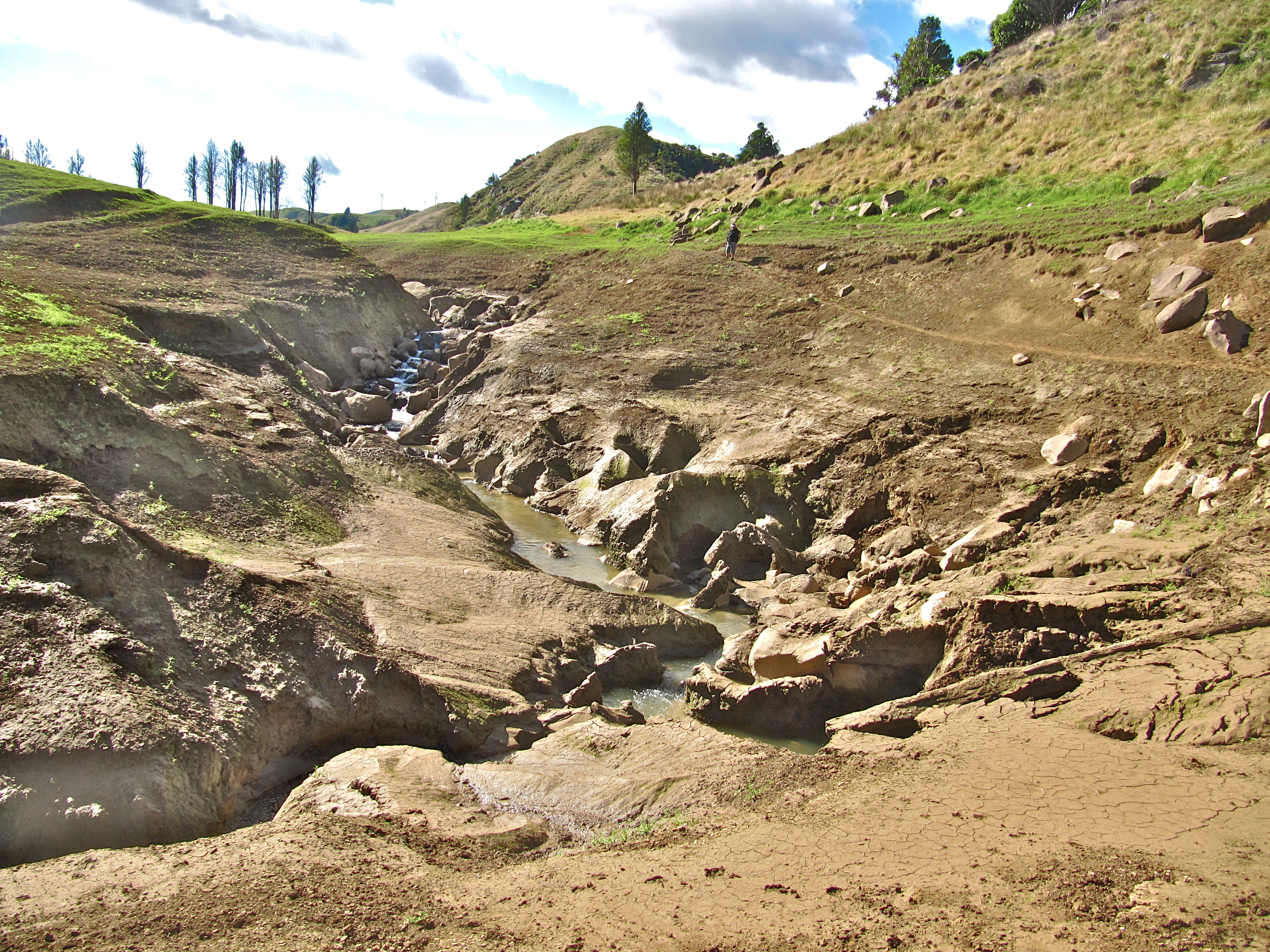
The sinkhole where Lake Disappear drains. The mud marks the normal height of the lake.

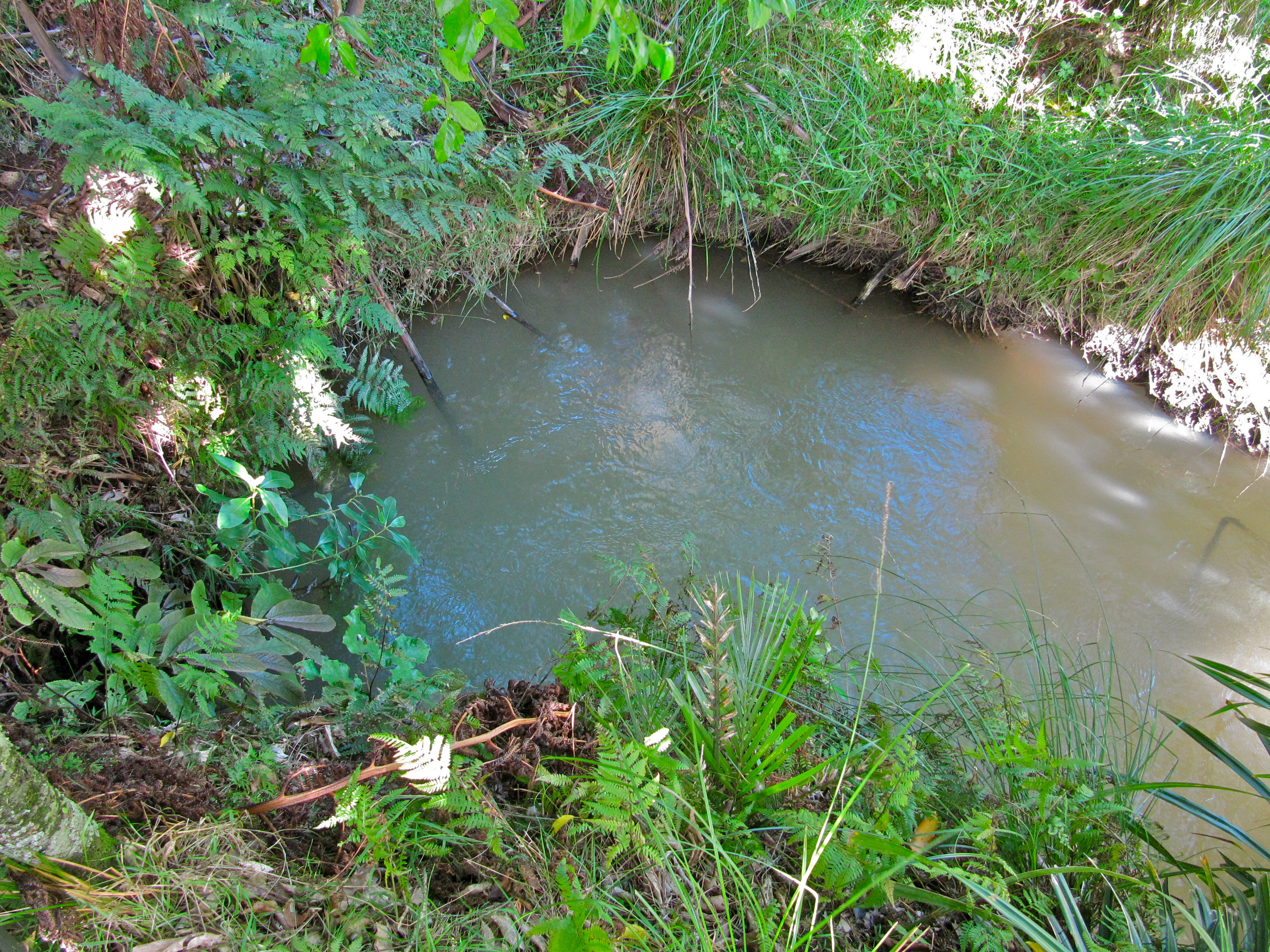
Pakihi Stream re-emerges from its 1 kilometre (0.62 mi) underground segment with just a few ripples.

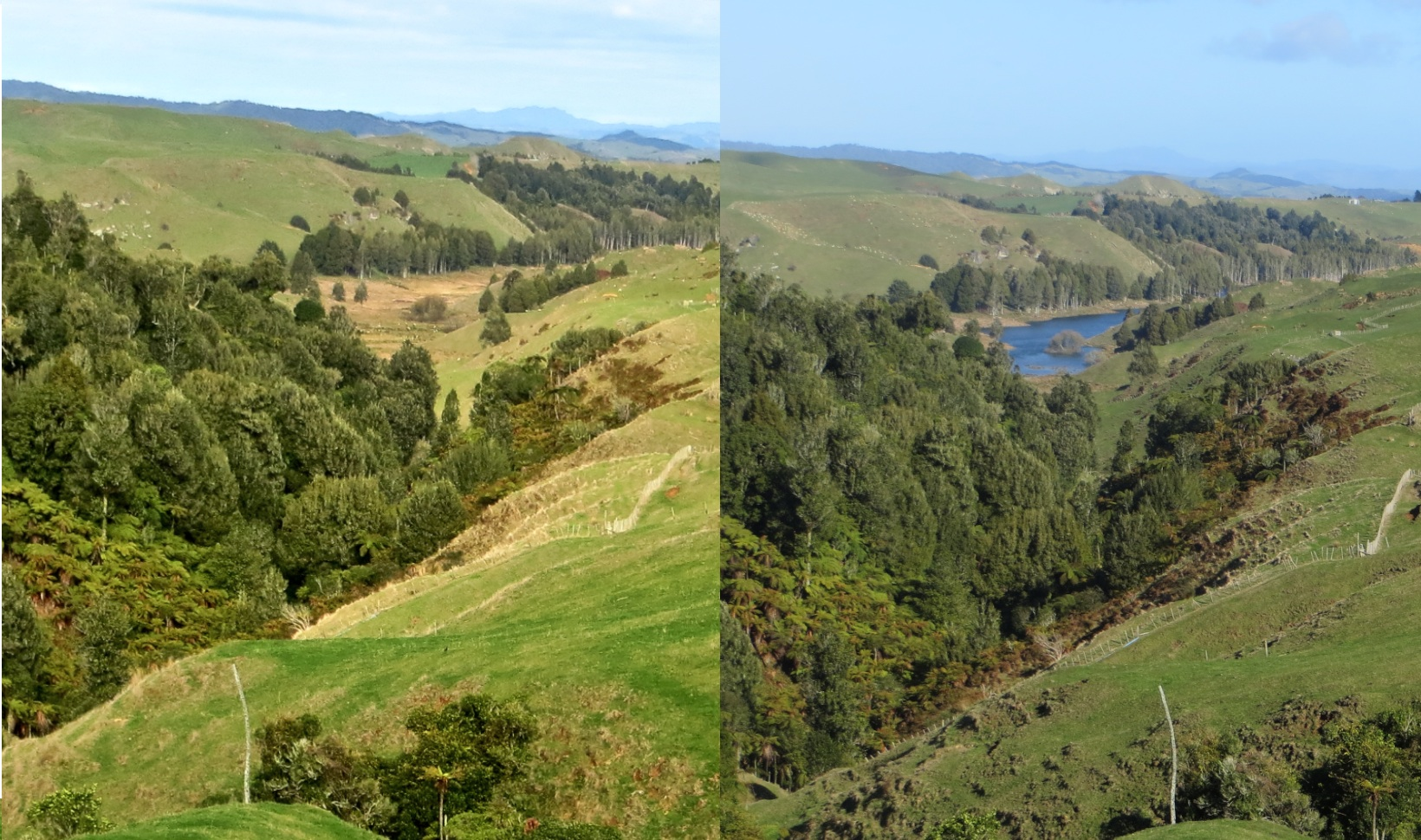
Views from Plateau Rd
when dry (7 June 2014) and wet (23 July 2014).
