= Pakoka River =

River in New Zealand

Coordinates: 37.936136°S 174.850228°E

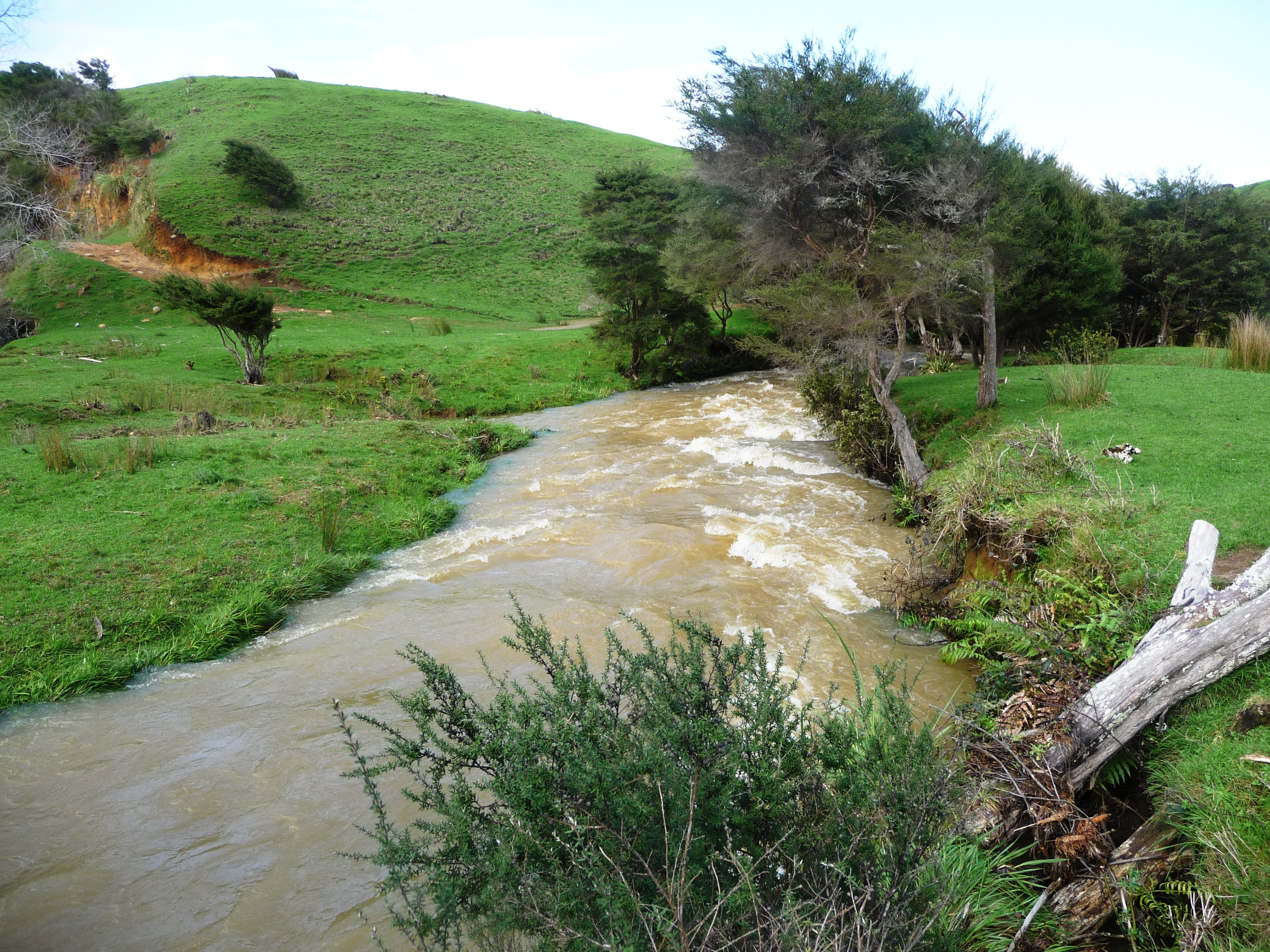
- The Pakoka River in flood with sediment loading

Location
- Country: New Zealand

Physical characteristics
- Source
  - location: Wharauroa Plateau
  - elevation: 490 m (1,610 ft)
- Mouth
  - location: Aotea Harbour
  - elevation: 0 m (0 ft)
- Length: 21 km (13 mi)
- Basin size: 3,227 ha (7,970 acres)

The Pakoka River is a river of the Waikato Region of New Zealand's North Island. It flows southwest from its source southeast of Raglan to reach the northeastern end of the Aotea Harbour. The catchment is made up of just over 86 kilometres (53 mi) of waterways.

== Geology ==
The most notable features of the Pakoka valley were formed by Upper Pliocene–Lower Pleistocene Okete Volcanics about 2 million years ago. These rocks form the top of the Wharauroa Plateau, where the Pakoka rises. They also flowed down from a vent about a kilometre northwest of Bridal Veil Falls to block the valley and form the falls.

From its source the river soon drops about 200 metres (660 ft), cutting into Coleman Conglomerate a Puaroan (in the Tithonian epoch, about 150 million years ago) poorly sorted conglomerate of sandstone and siltstone, containing andesitic pebbles up to 5 centimetres (2 in) in diameter.

A rock arch and several notable bluffs are formed of late Whaingaroan Ahirau Sandstone formed about 28 million years ago. Although classified as sandstone, it looks more like limestone, with 40–60% calcium carbonate content and lapiez features in massive (lacking internal structures), blue-grey, calcareous, fine sandstone.

Apart from recent alluvial deposits, the other main rock in the valley is Hauturu Sandstone, which is mid to late Whaingaroan, about 30 million years old. It is commonly knobbly due to resistant bands and lenses of hard calcareous sandstone in soft friable quartzofeldspathic sand.

== Biota ==
About two-thirds of the catchment is pasture, with the rest under trees and scrub. Less than 10% of the catchment was fenced from livestock in 2014. New Zealand fernbird and Spotless crake have been recorded in the catchment.

A Regional Council study describes the vegetation around the estuary - "Te Heru Point and up towards Pakoka Landing, a forest of akeake, kanuka and kōwhai lines the estuary arm. Spartina is present on the [right bank] upstream of Ohiawhakainga Creek. Patches of sea meadow are found at the mouth of the Motakotako Creek in front of the rushes. The saline influence on the vegetation finishes just upstream of the road bridge at Pakoka Landing. Moving downstream on the true-left bank are bands of saltmarsh ribbonwood with marsh clubrush and raupo wetland behind. Small patches of seagrass are found on the mud flats around the corner where the river widens out. The farmland is not fenced along the [left bank] and stock access is potentially a problem. A mature (~10 years?) flowering mangrove is upstream of Karetoto Island. A small patch of saltwater paspalum is found immediately opposite the island. A patch of seagrass lies behind the oyster bank at Mowhiti Point. The harbour edge is lined by a thin band of rush."

Mitigation funding from Te Uku Wind Farm and support from farmers and Regional Council have resulted in Whaingaroa Harbour Care putting up 15 km of fencing to protect the river and its tributaries and planting 150,000 trees in the valley above Bridal Veil Falls. This has been followed by a possum and rat control project jointly with the Department of Conservation.

Six sites were surveyed for the windfarm and given Stream Health Index scores between 60 and 170.5 (poor to excellent). Their 2006 survey identified these stream quality indicator species in the Pakoka, - the higher the score, the more sensitive these macroinvertebrates are to pollution.

MCI score	Species	Prevalence
9	caddisfly (Olinga feredayi)	rare
9	spiny-gilled mayfly (Coloburiscus humeralis)	occasional
8	mayfly (Deleatidium)	rare
7	caddisfly (Rhyacophilidae)	occasional
7	dobsonfly (Archichauliodes diversus)	occasional
7	mayfly (Zephlebia)	rare
6	riffle beetle (Elmidae)	occasional
5	stony-cased caddisfly (Pycnocentrodes)	occasional
5	crustacea (Paratya curvirostris)	rare
4	mud snail (Potamopyrgus antipodarum)	abundant
3	sand fly (Austrosimulium)	occasional

The NIWA Freshwater Fish Database shows the Pakoka has longfin eel, koura, Cran's Bully (Gobiomorphus basalis) and redfin bully, banded kokopu and smelt.

== Bridges ==
The Pakoka is bridged by Plateau Road, Kawhia Road and Te Papatapu Road, which is the lowest bridge, being alongside Pakoka Landing. That lowest bridge was opened in 1922 and seems to have been used by a motor service from February that year.

== Gallery ==
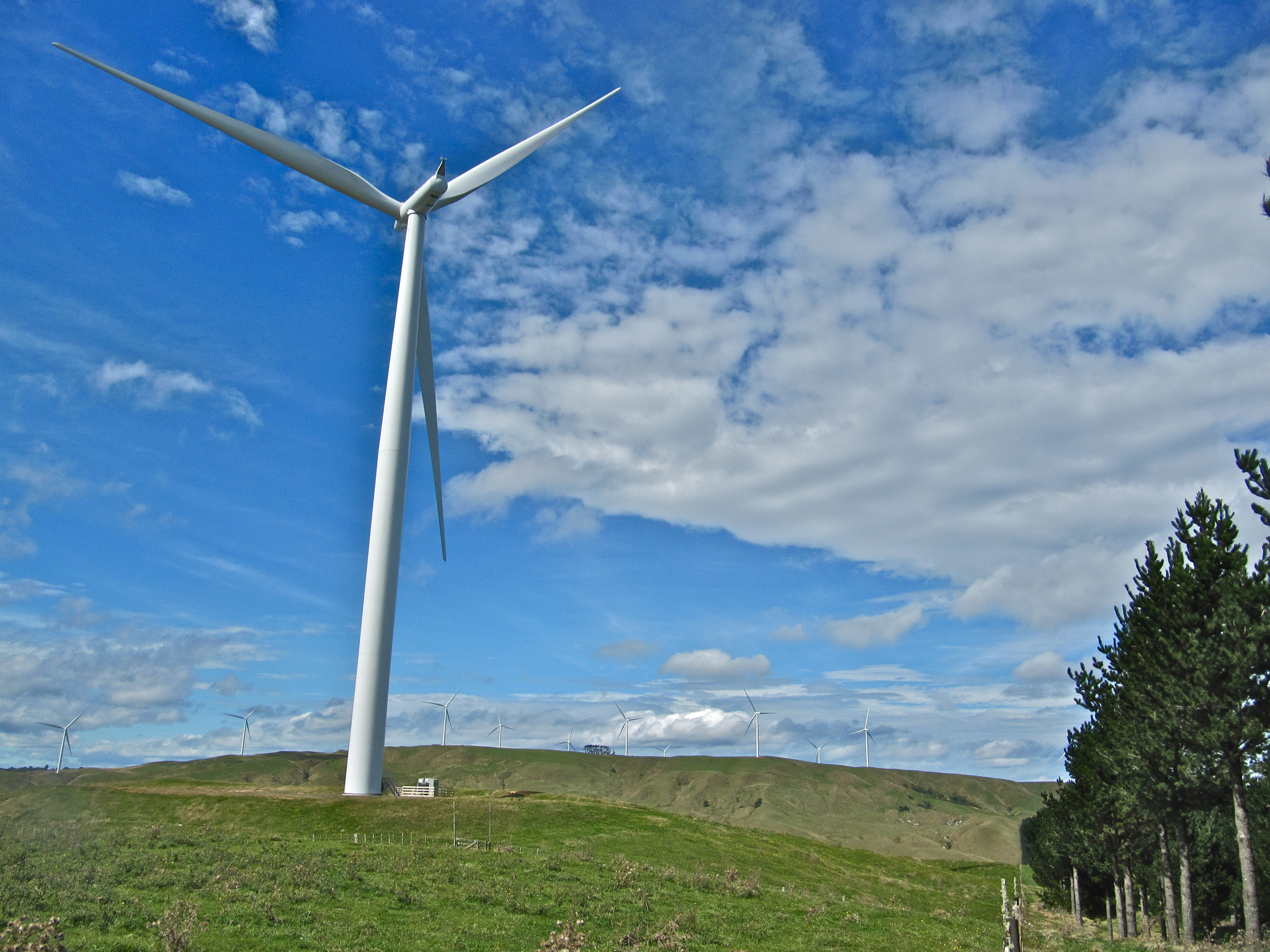
The river rises at Te Uku Wind Farm.

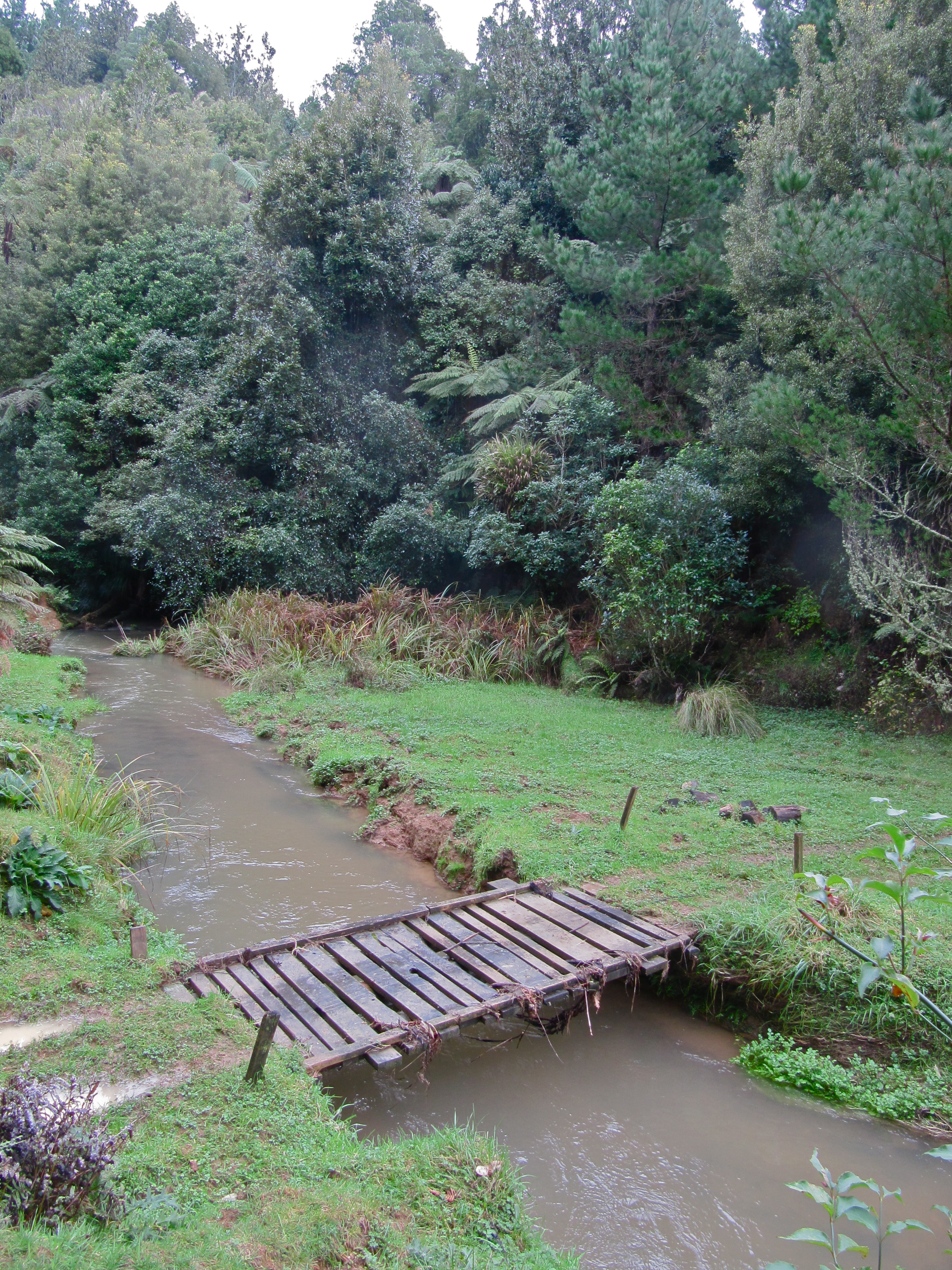
After two kilometres in the pine forest the river is wide enough to be bridged.

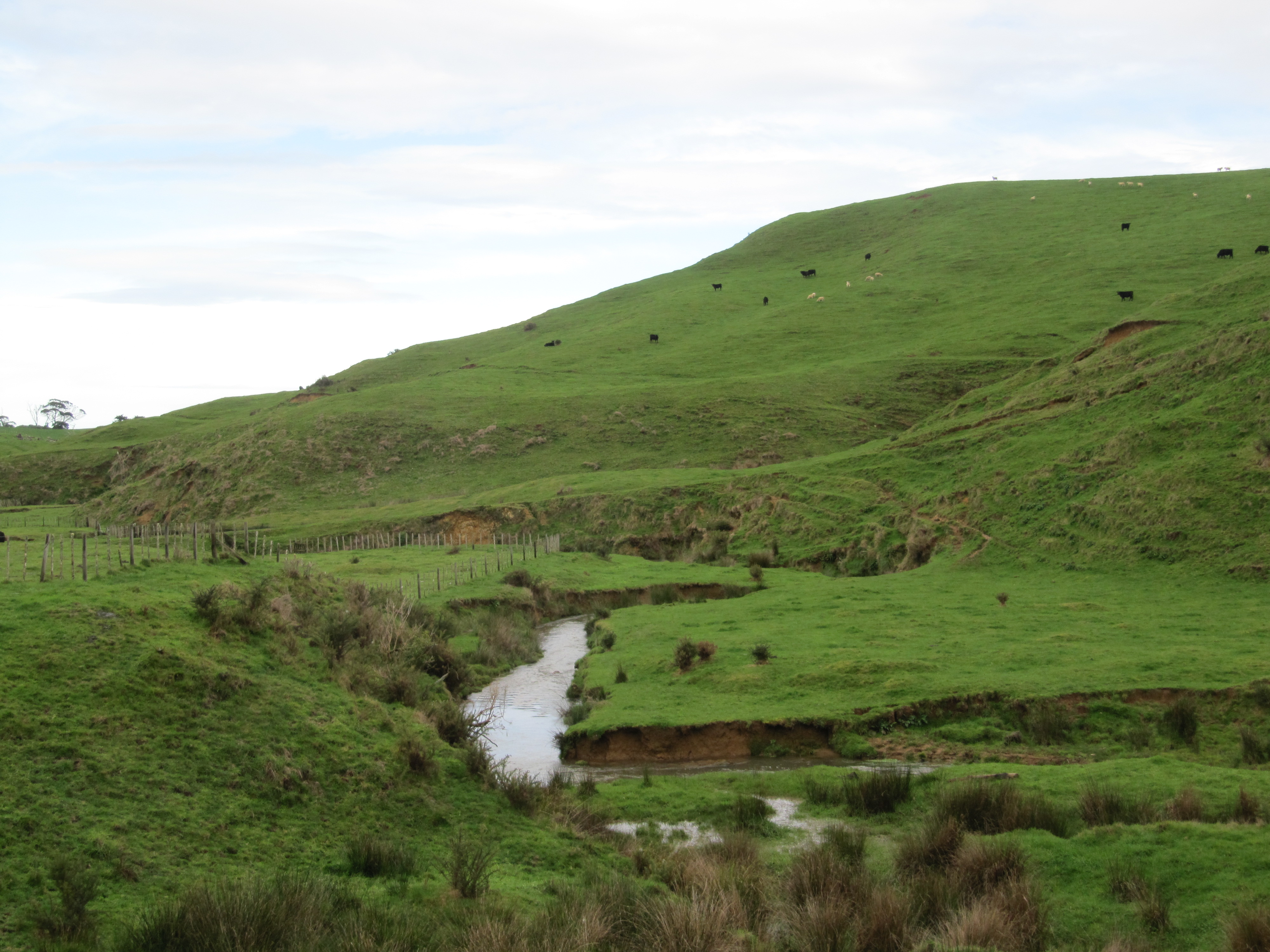
The area between the pine forest and Bridal Veil, alongside Pipiwharauroa Way, has now been fenced and planted.

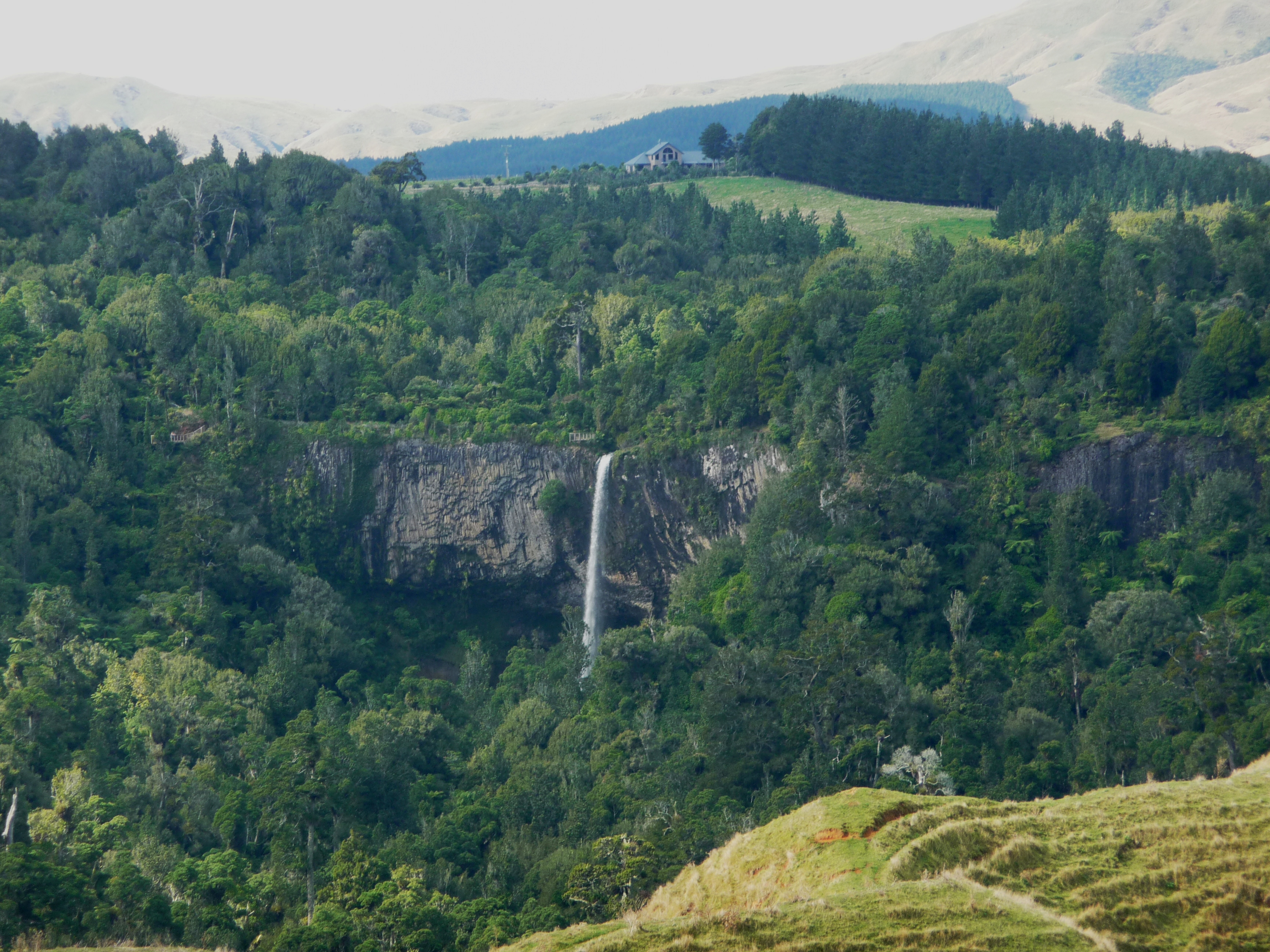
Native bush remains around Bridal Veil Falls.

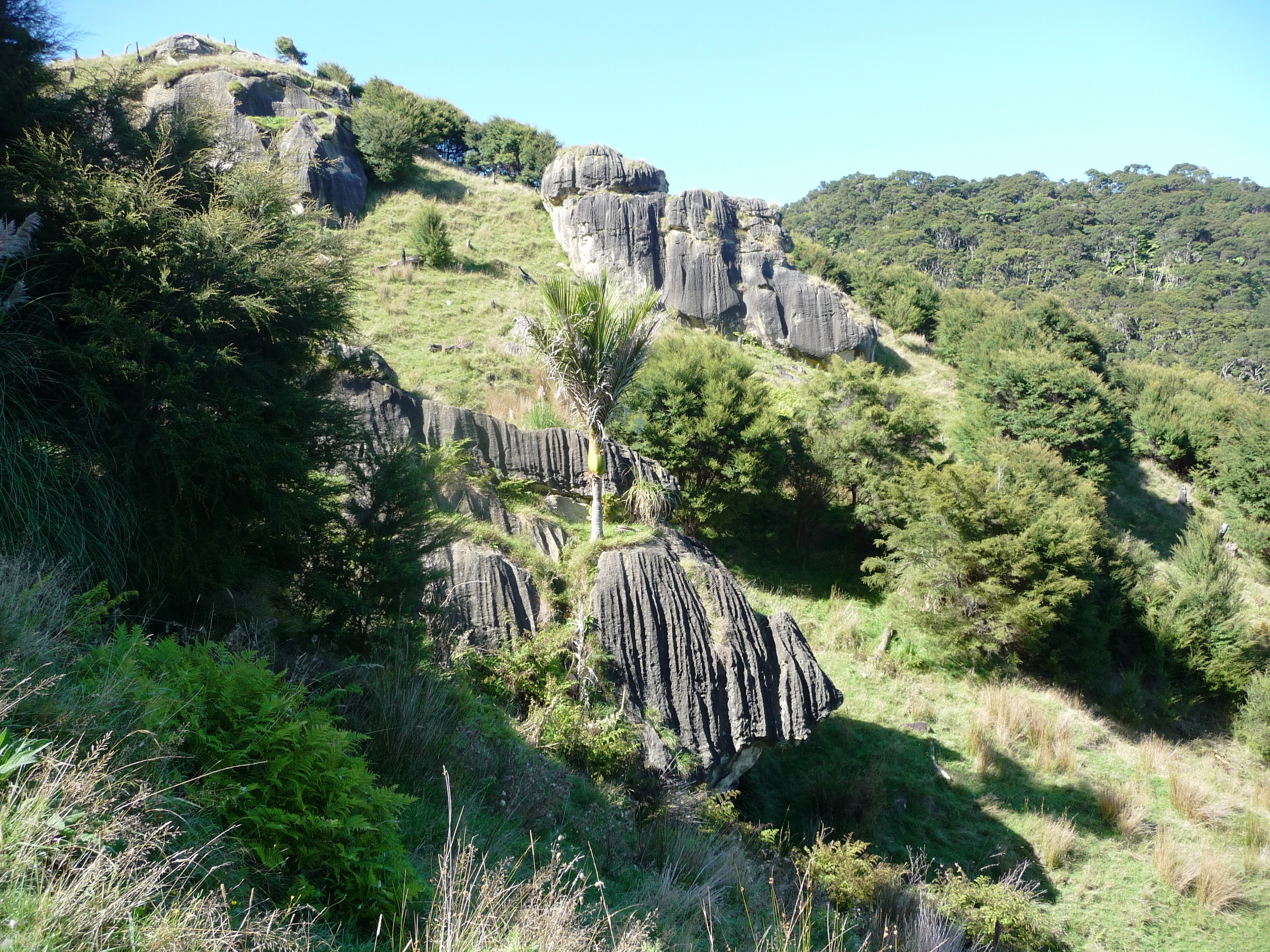
Fluted limestone in a side valley south of the river

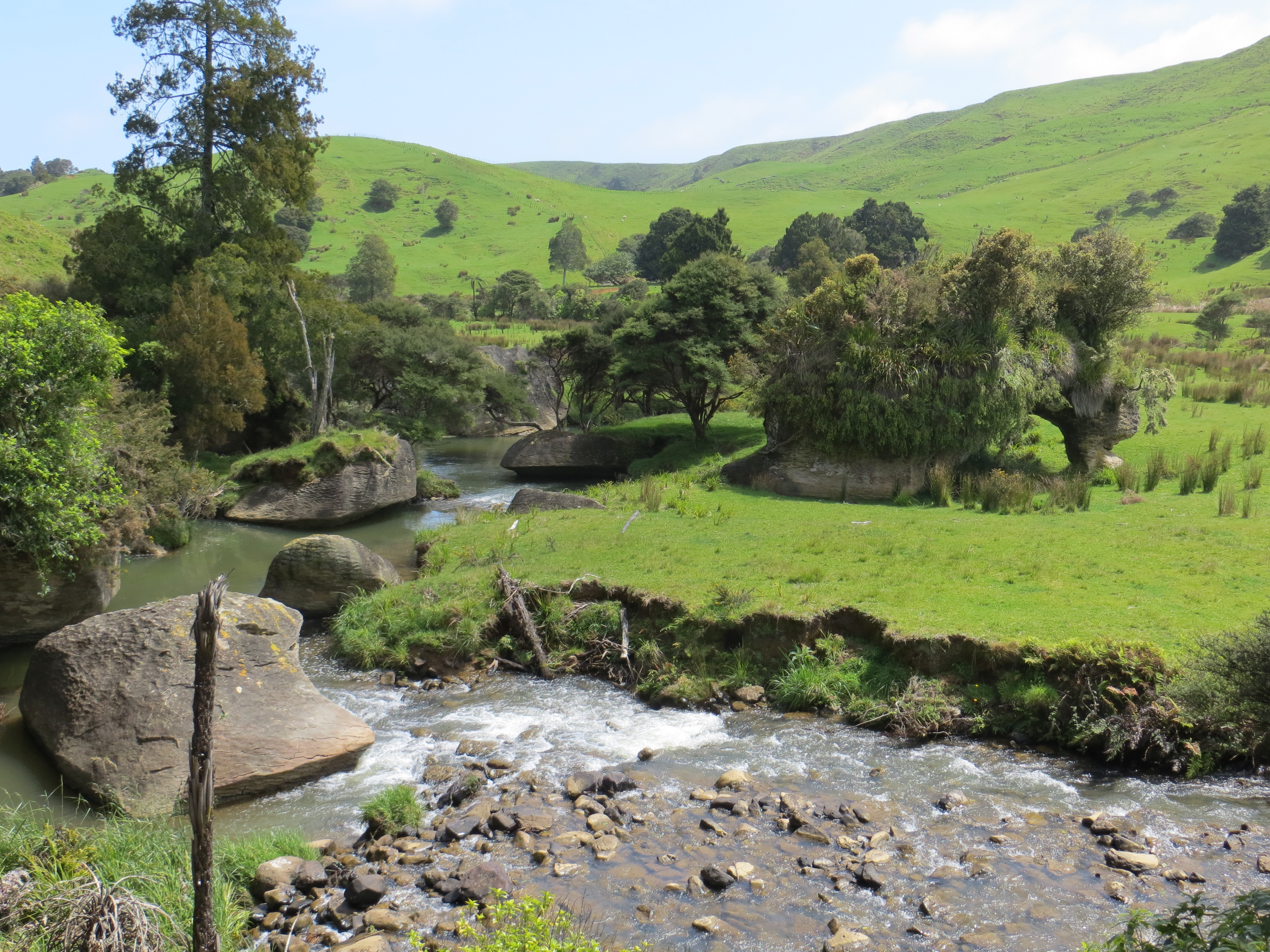
The lower river and a limestone arch

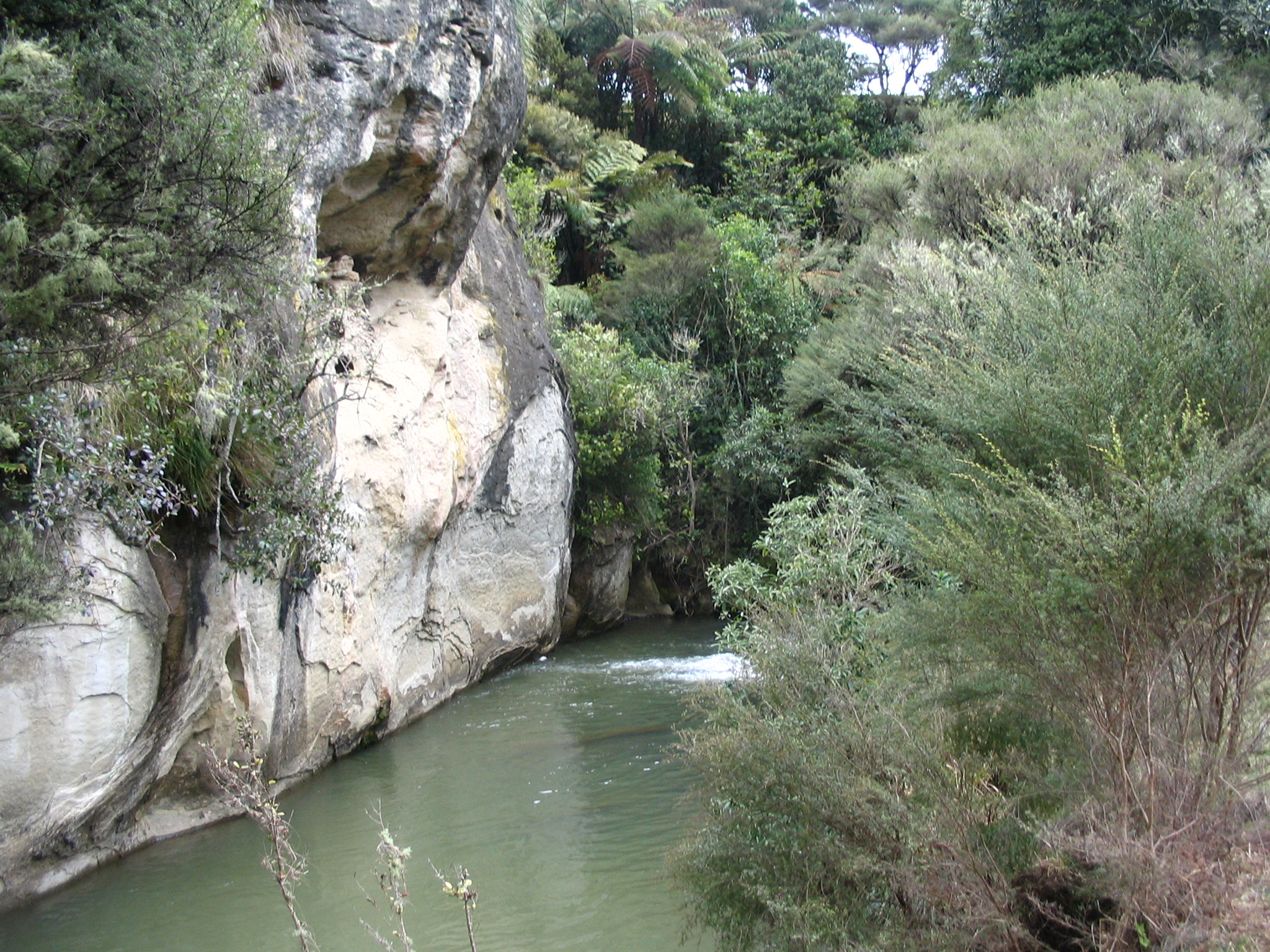
A kilometre from the estuary the river turns a tight ox-bow at a limestone cliff.

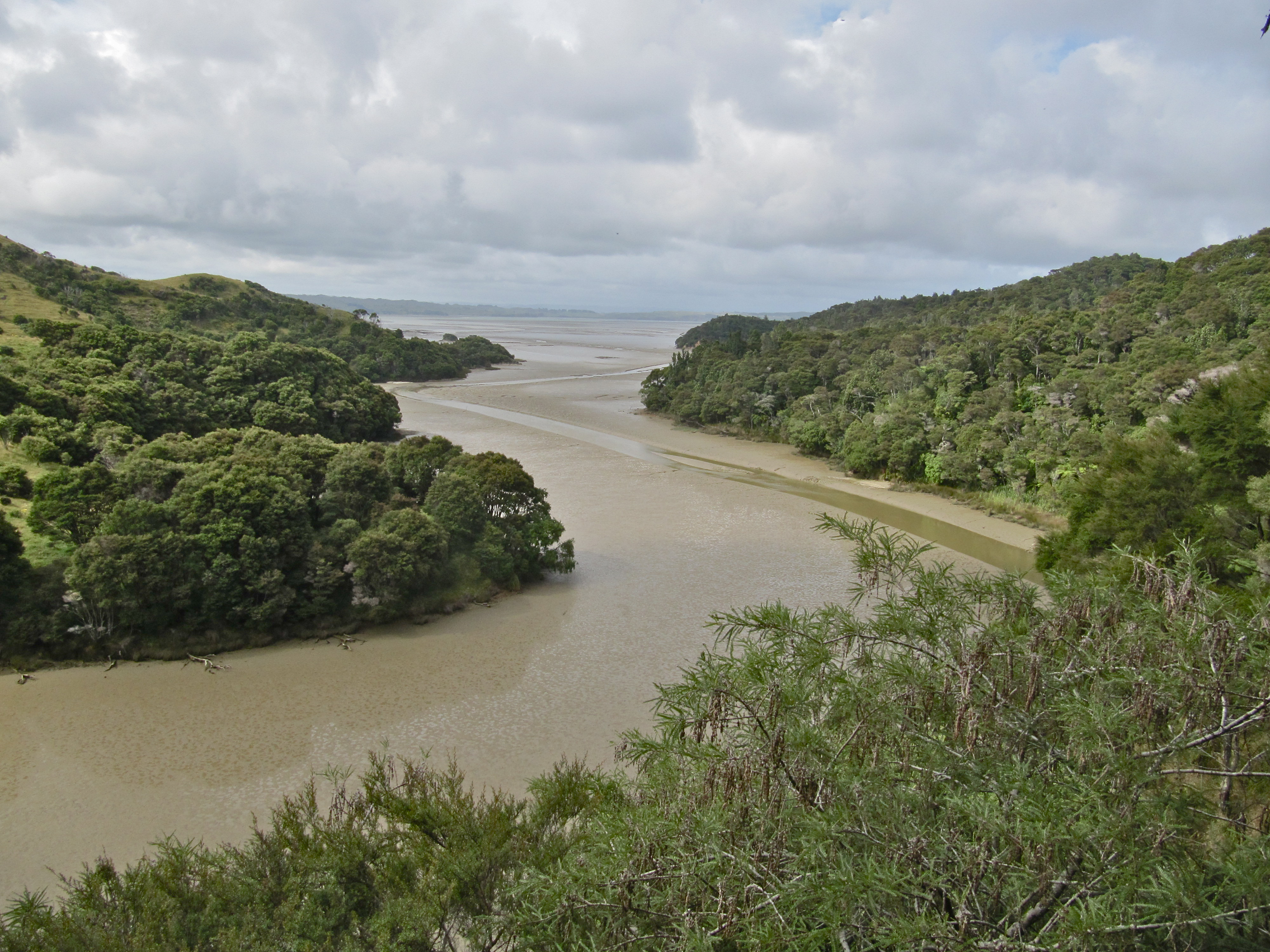
Akeake, kanuka and kowhai line the Pakoka estuary.

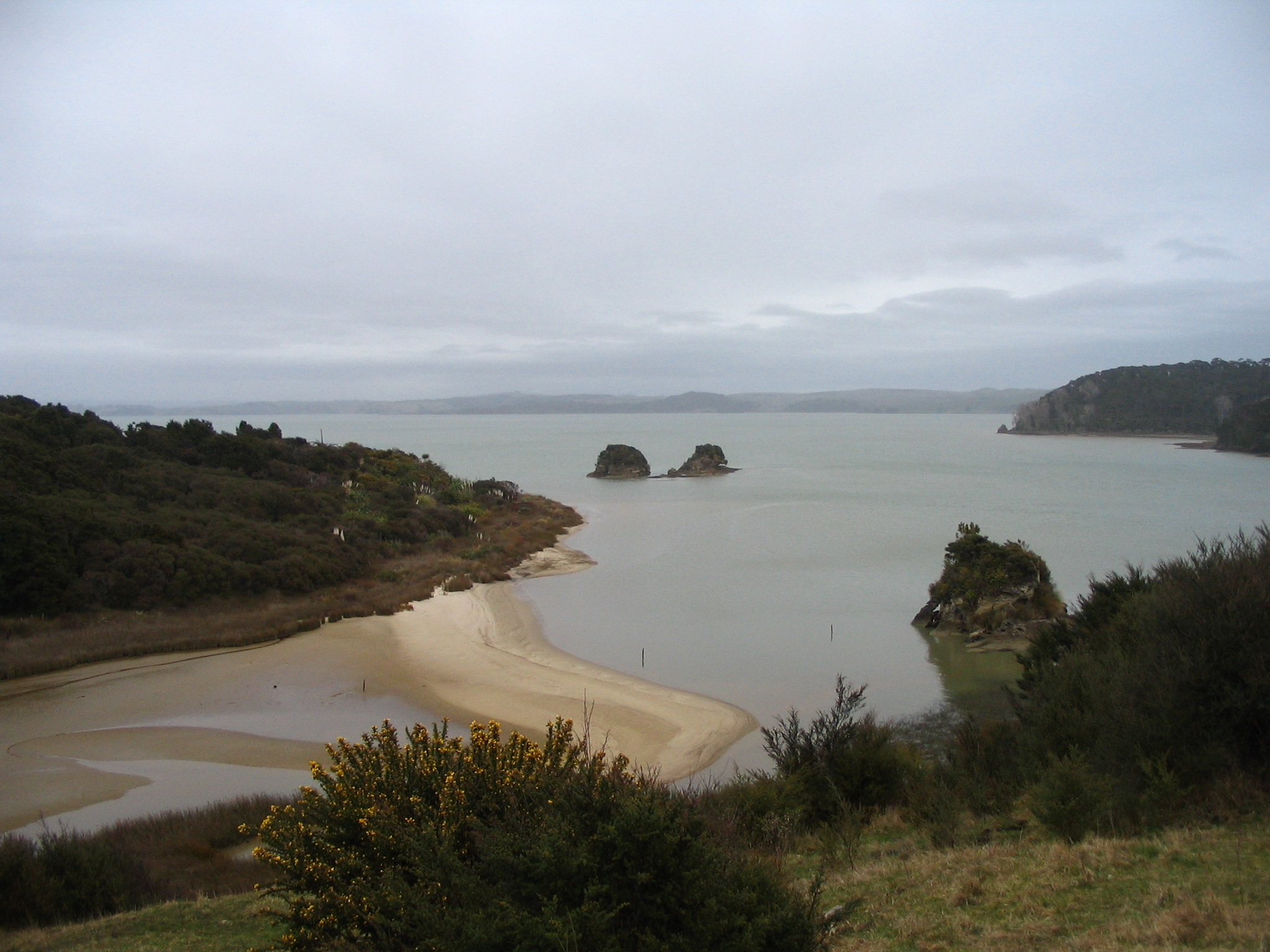
Pakoka River estuary, Karetoto Island and Aotea Harbour

== See also ==
- List of rivers of New Zealand
