= Volcanogenic lake =

Lake formed by volcanic activity

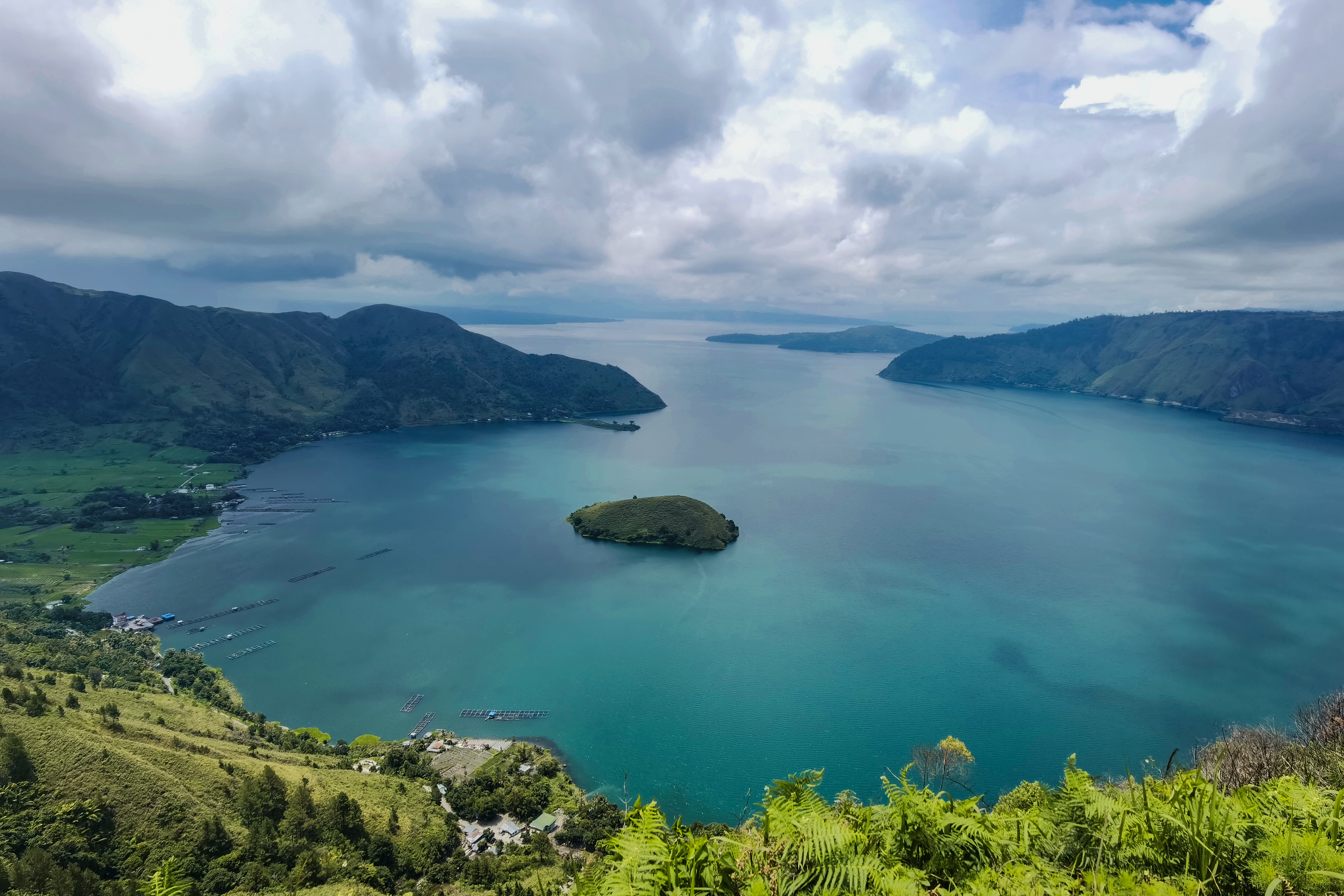
View of a bay in Lake Toba, on the island of Sumatra, Indonesia, which is the largest volcanic lake in the world

A volcanogenic lake is a lake formed as a result of volcanic activity. They are generally a body of water inside an inactive volcanic crater (crater lakes) but can also be large volumes of molten lava within an active volcanic crater (lava lakes) and waterbodies constrained by lava flows, pyroclastic flows or lahars in valley systems. The term volcanic lake is also used to describe volcanogenic lakes, although it is more commonly assigned to those inside volcanic craters.

== Volcanic crater lakes ==
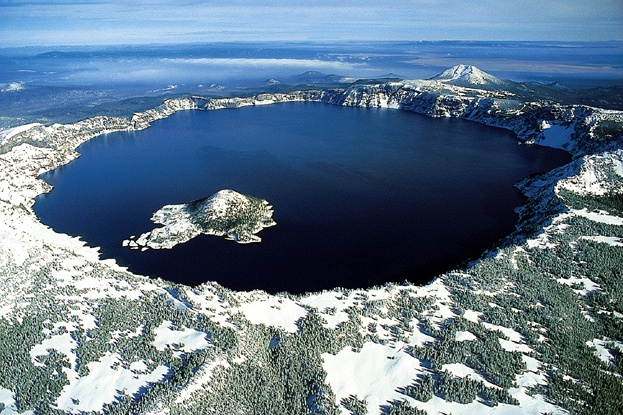
Crater Lake in Oregon, USA

Lakes in calderas fill large craters formed by the collapse of a volcano during an eruption. Examples:

- Crater Lake, Oregon, United States
- Heaven Lake, China/North Korea
- Lake Toba, Sumatra, Indonesia

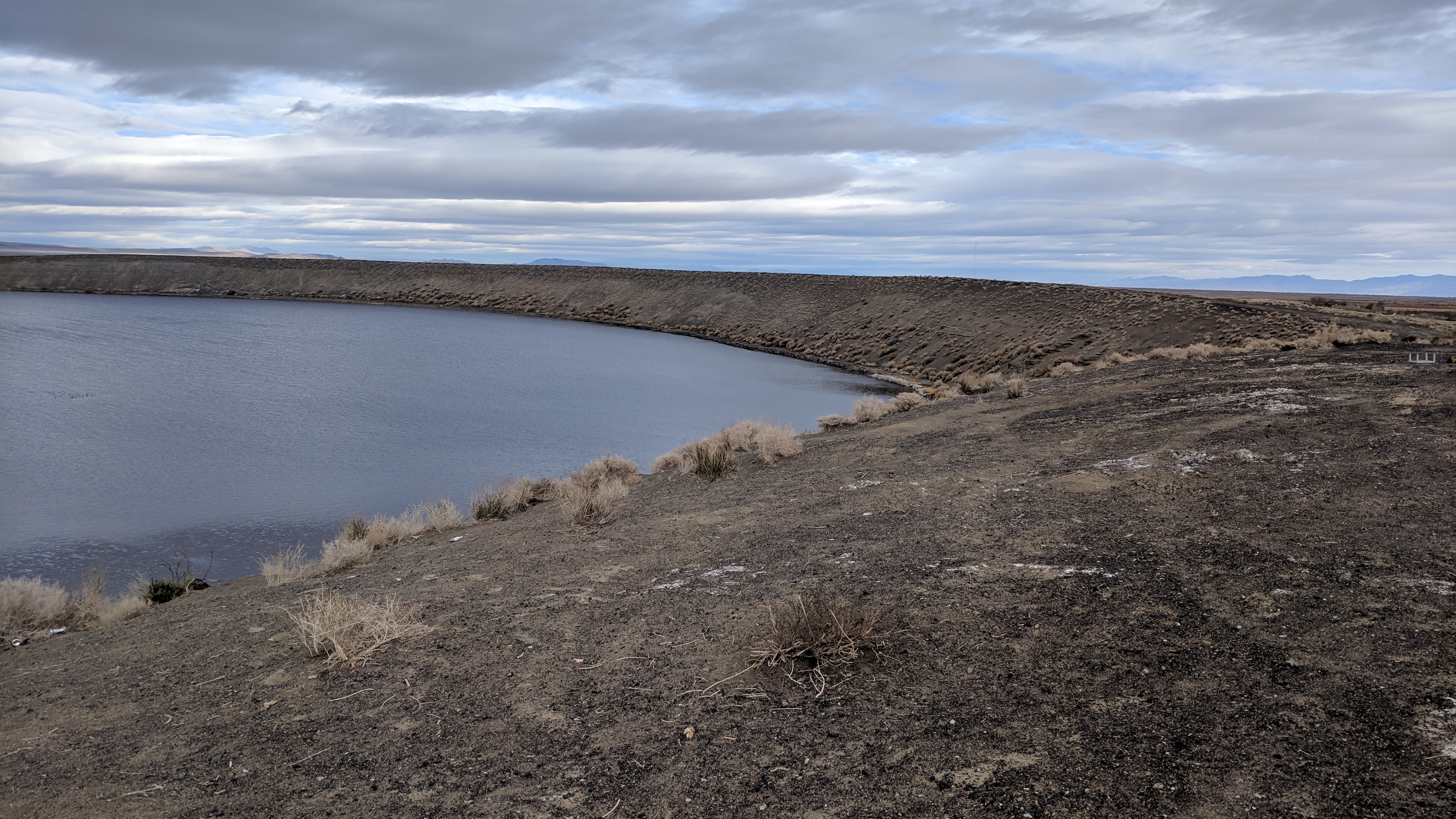
Soda Lakes in Nevada, USA

Lakes in maars fill small craters where an eruption deposited debris around a vent. Examples:

- Lake Nyos, Northwest Region, Cameroon
- Lac Pavin, Puy-de-Dôme, France
- Soda Lakes, Nevada, United States

== Lava lakes ==
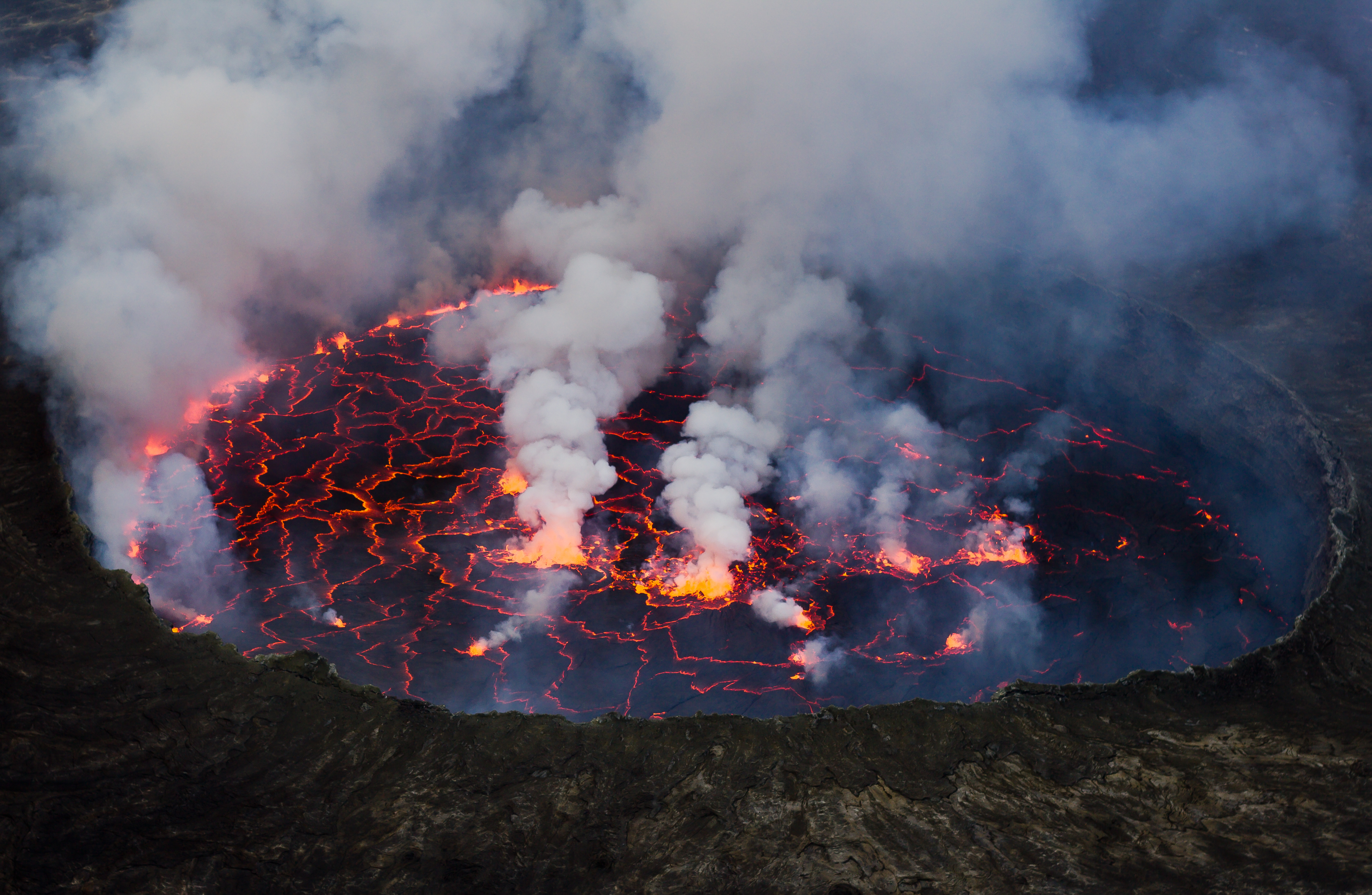
Lava lake at Mount Nyiragongo in the Democratic Republic of the Congo

These are some examples of rare lava lakes where molten lava in a volcano maintains relative equilibrium, neither rising to overflowing nor sinking to drain away.

- Mount Erebus, Ross Island, Antarctica
- Erta Ale, Afar Region, Ethiopia
- Mount Nyiragongo, North Kivu, Democratic Republic of the Congo

== Lava-dammed lakes ==
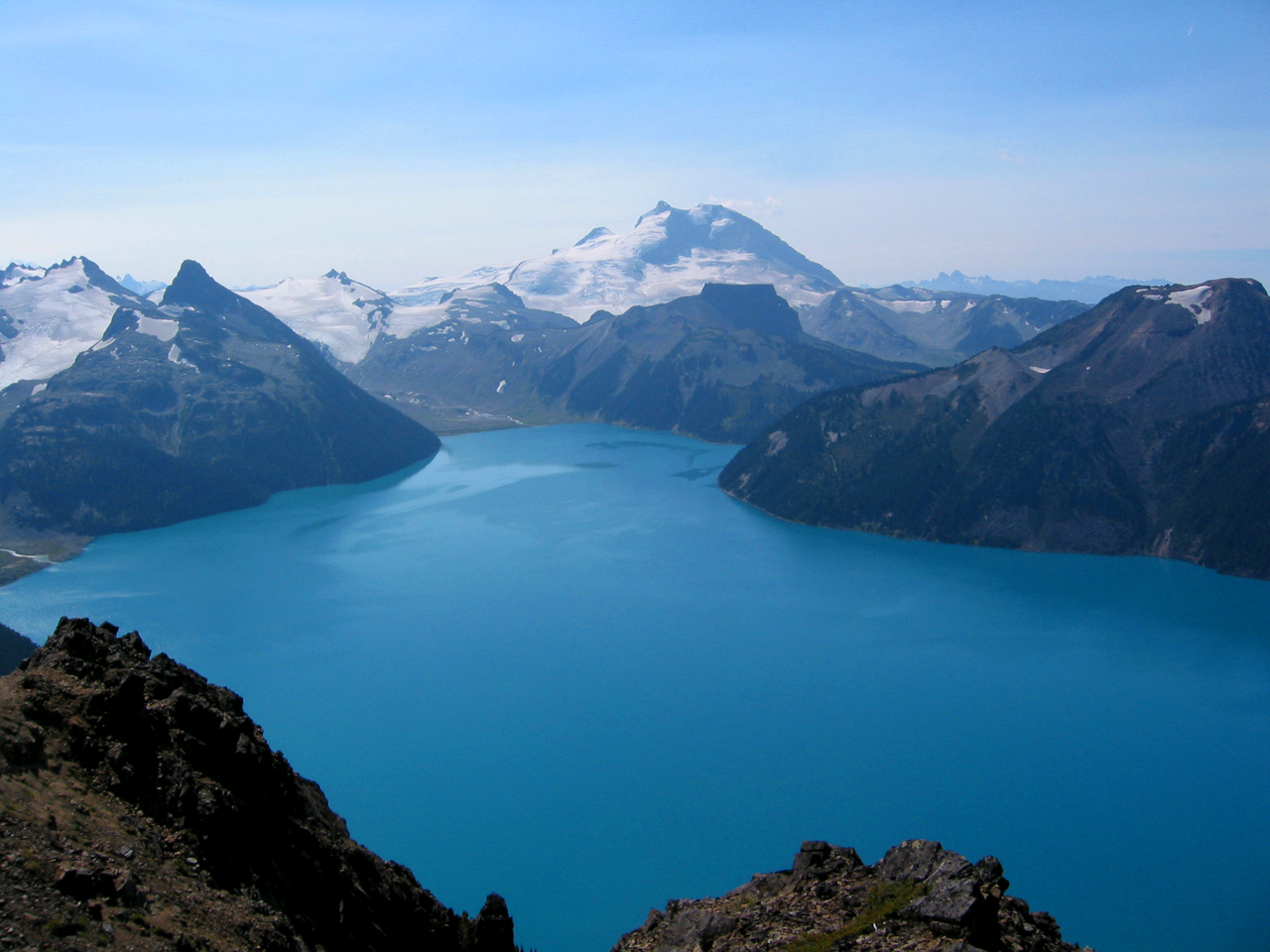
Garibaldi Lake in British Columbia, Canada, is impounded by lava flows comprising The Barrier

- Lake Balık, Ağrı Province, Turkey
- Lake Disappear, North Island, New Zealand
- Garibaldi Lake, British Columbia, Canada
- Lake Güija, Guatemala/El Salvador
