= Te Uku Wind Farm =

Wind farm in New Zealand

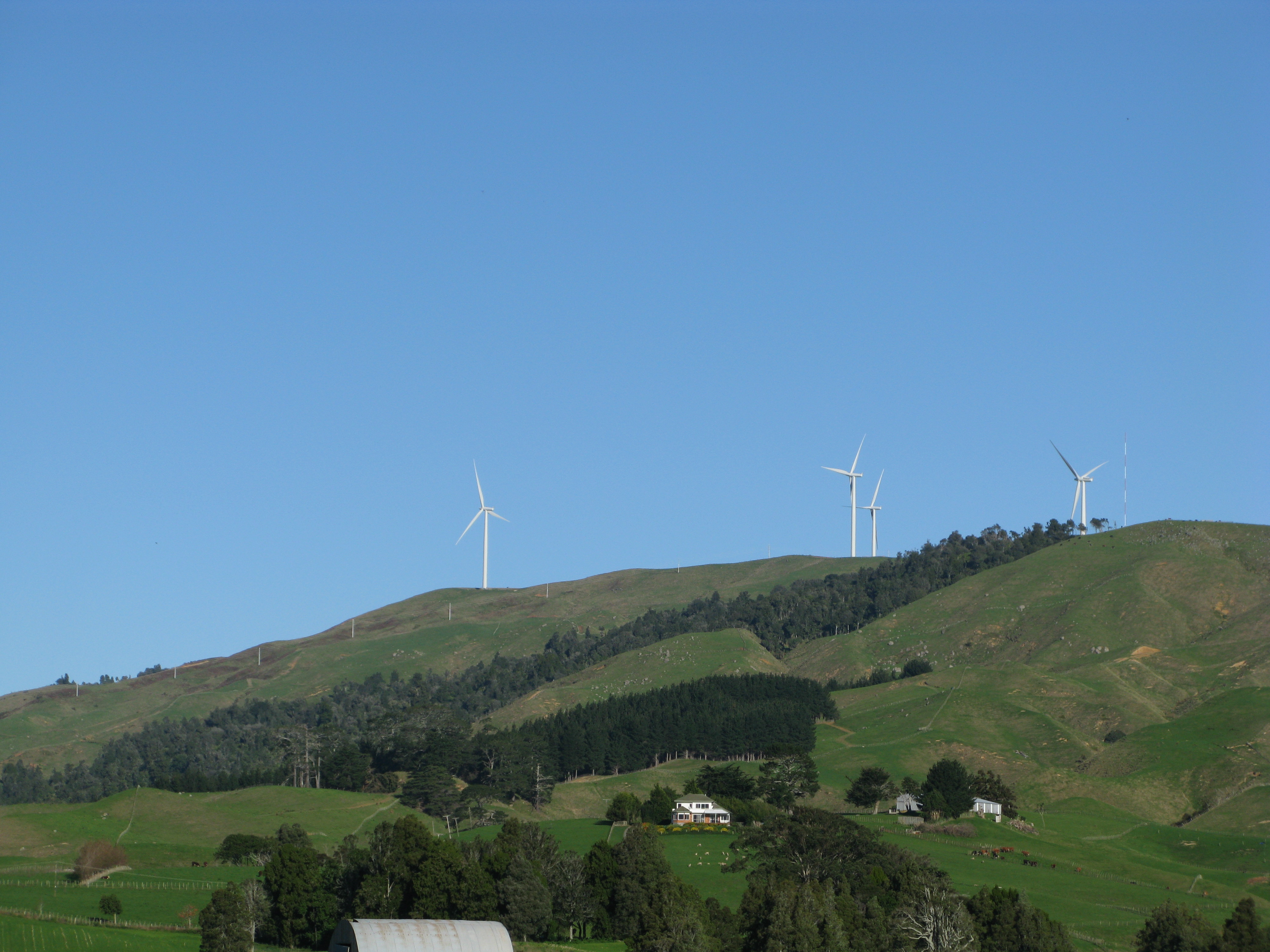
- The wind farm in June 2012
- Country: New Zealand
- Location: Te Uku, near Raglan
- Coordinates: 37°52′42″S 174°57′47″E
- Status: Operational
- Construction began: October 2010
- Commission date: 19 November 2011
- Construction cost: $230m
- Owners: Meridian Energy and New Zealand

Wind farm
- Type: Onshore
- Hub height: 80 m (262 ft)
- Rotor diameter: 101 m (331 ft)
- Rated wind speed: 14–90 km/h (9–56 mph)
- Site area: 200 hectares (2.0 km^{2})
- Site elevation: 500m

Power generation
- Units operational: 28
- Make and model: Siemens: SWT-2.3-101
- Nameplate capacity: 64 MW

External links
- Website: www.meridianenergy.co.nz/power-stations/wind/te-uku
- Commons: Related media on Commons

Te Uku Wind Farm is a wind farm located at Te Uku near Raglan. It has a capacity of 64 MW using 28 wind turbines. Construction was completed in March 2011, at a cost of $200 million. The farm covers an area of approximately 200 hectares (2.0 km^{2}). The wind farm is jointly owned by WEL Networks and Meridian Energy.

Resource consent was granted in May 2008 and appeals were resolved by November 2008. Construction of the wind farm began in 2010. Hick Bros Civil and Spartan Construction won an award for outstanding technical and environmental planning. The wind farm was officially opened by Prime Minister John Key in February 2011. Te Uku was fully operational on 10 March 2011.

Te Uku Windfarm is controlled from Wellington where Meridian has its control centre for running all of their New Zealand Hydro and Wind generation assets.

The windfarm is linked to the national grid at Te Kowhai substation by about 17 km (11 mi) of 33 kV lines on 159 steel poles built on concrete pile foundations and an underground cable from just west of Waitetuna Valley Rd to Cogswell Rd, a total of about 25 km (16 mi).

== Construction ==
Each 130.5 m. high, 318 tonne, turbine took 2 or 3 days to build using 4 cranes, the largest a 600 tonne KR Wind/NZ Crane Group Alliance crane. Towers were formed in 3 sections (made in Korea), and topped by Siemens components (as at Makara) - a 3.5 m circumference, 81 tonne nacelle, hub and 3 turbine blades. Barge transport was considered, but rejected in favour of road transporters running from September 2010 to January 2011.

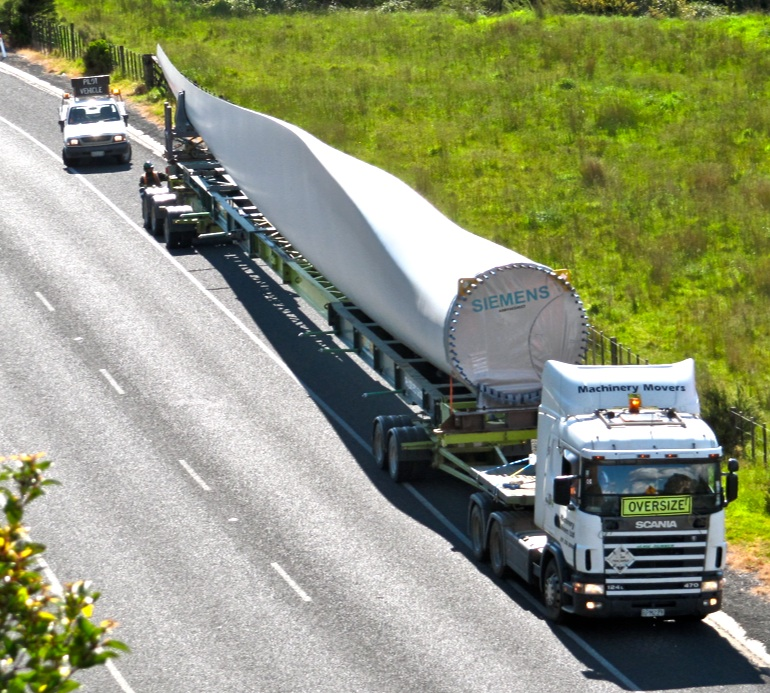
A 10.9 tonne 49m long Siemens turbine blade waits at the summit of SH23 for its scheduled time to close the road in November 2010.

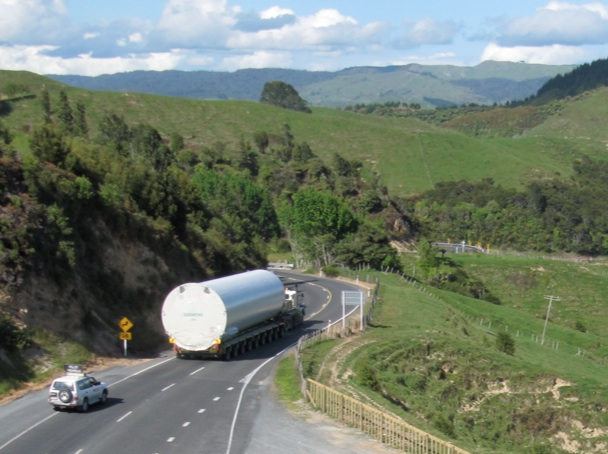
A 54 tonne 27m long Korean built tower segment descends SH23 on its journey from Ports of Auckland in November 2010.

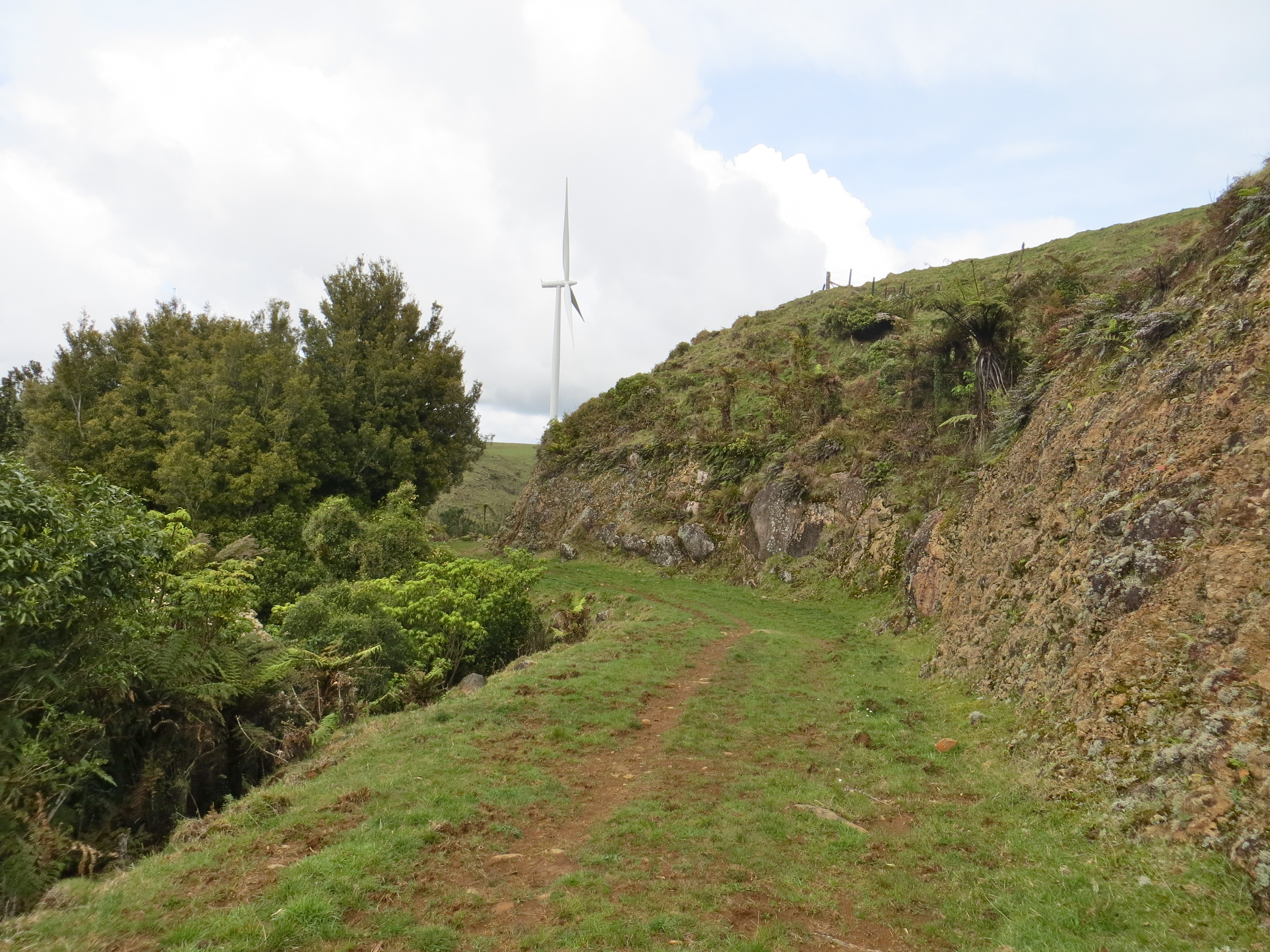
The part-formed cutting through Okete Volcanics rock has been widened twice since 2003.

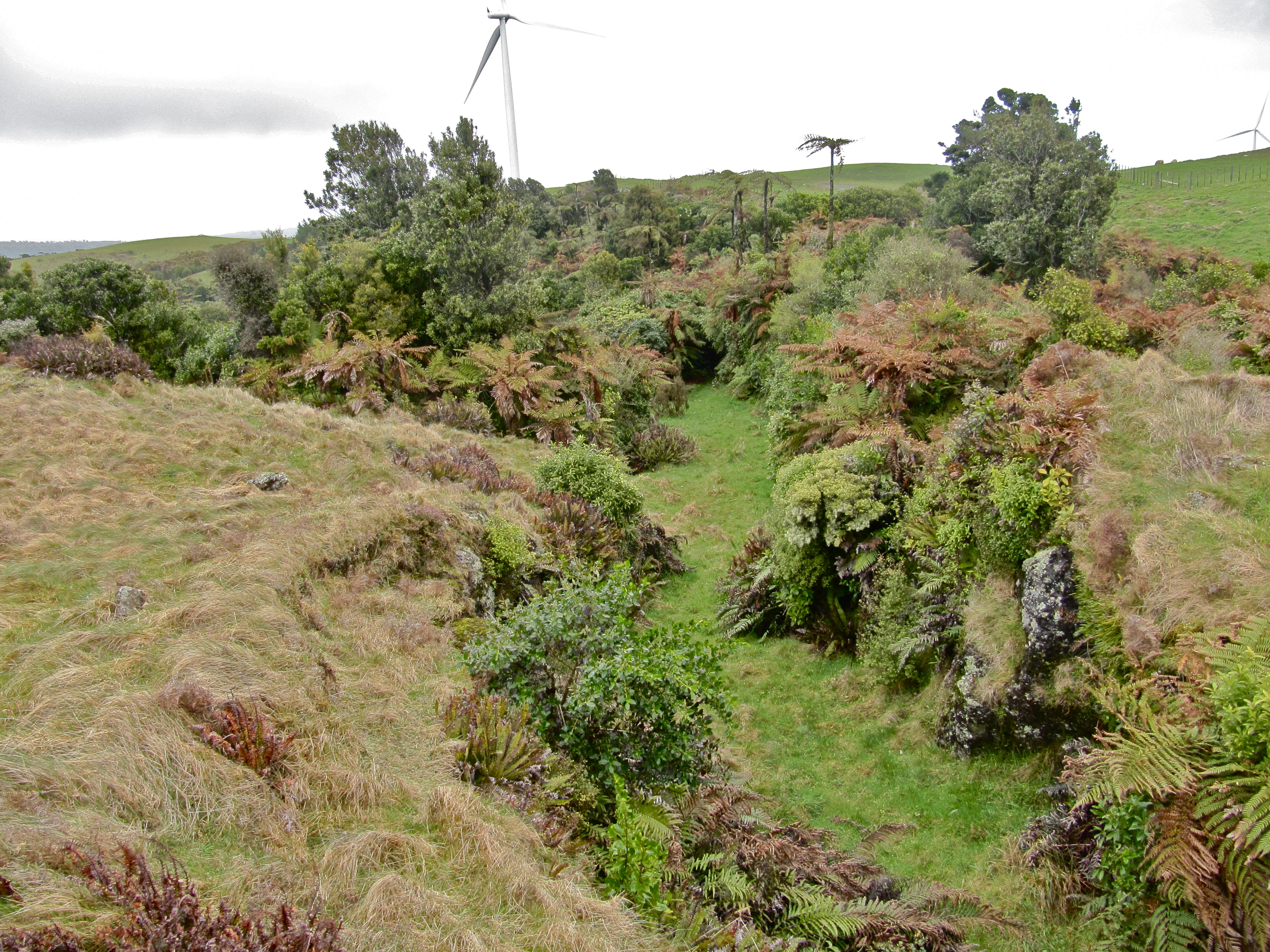
On the Vandy Rd side of the summit the part-formed Plateau Rd drops through a rock cutting about 300 metres long, 3 metres wide and up to 3 metres deep. In the 1940s it is said a car managed to follow this road, though it is now very difficult to get a mountain bike along it.

== Pipiwharauroa Way ==
One of the mitigation measures was this walking and cycling track. The track climbs from a car park on Kawhia Rd, near Bridal Veil, runs about 6 km and climbs 280m to the windfarm on Wharauroa Plateau. Over 2 km of less interesting walking can be saved if the walk is started from the gate at the end of the driveable part of Plateau Rd. From this point Lake Disappear can be seen to the south after wet weather. The track peters out into the partly formed paper road (see the dashed line on the 1:50,000 map just north of the Pakihi Stream). It follows an ancient Maori track which was often used by warriors on raids between Waikato and Kawhia.

The road access to the windfarm largely followed the paper road, which was started around 1900 (a local historian, Bob Vernon, wrote that a store ledger started at Te Mata in 1896 includes at least 11 workers on the road) and seemingly abandoned a few years later, though Bob Vernon also wrote, "about 1919 the Public Works Department cut a six-foot track through solid bush, from the south-eastern end of the plateau [where it joins this paper road] to the head of the Makomako valley".

In 2013 there was controversy between a local farmer and Waikato District Council about whether Pipiwharauroa Way could be closed for the lambing season.

== Microwave tower ==
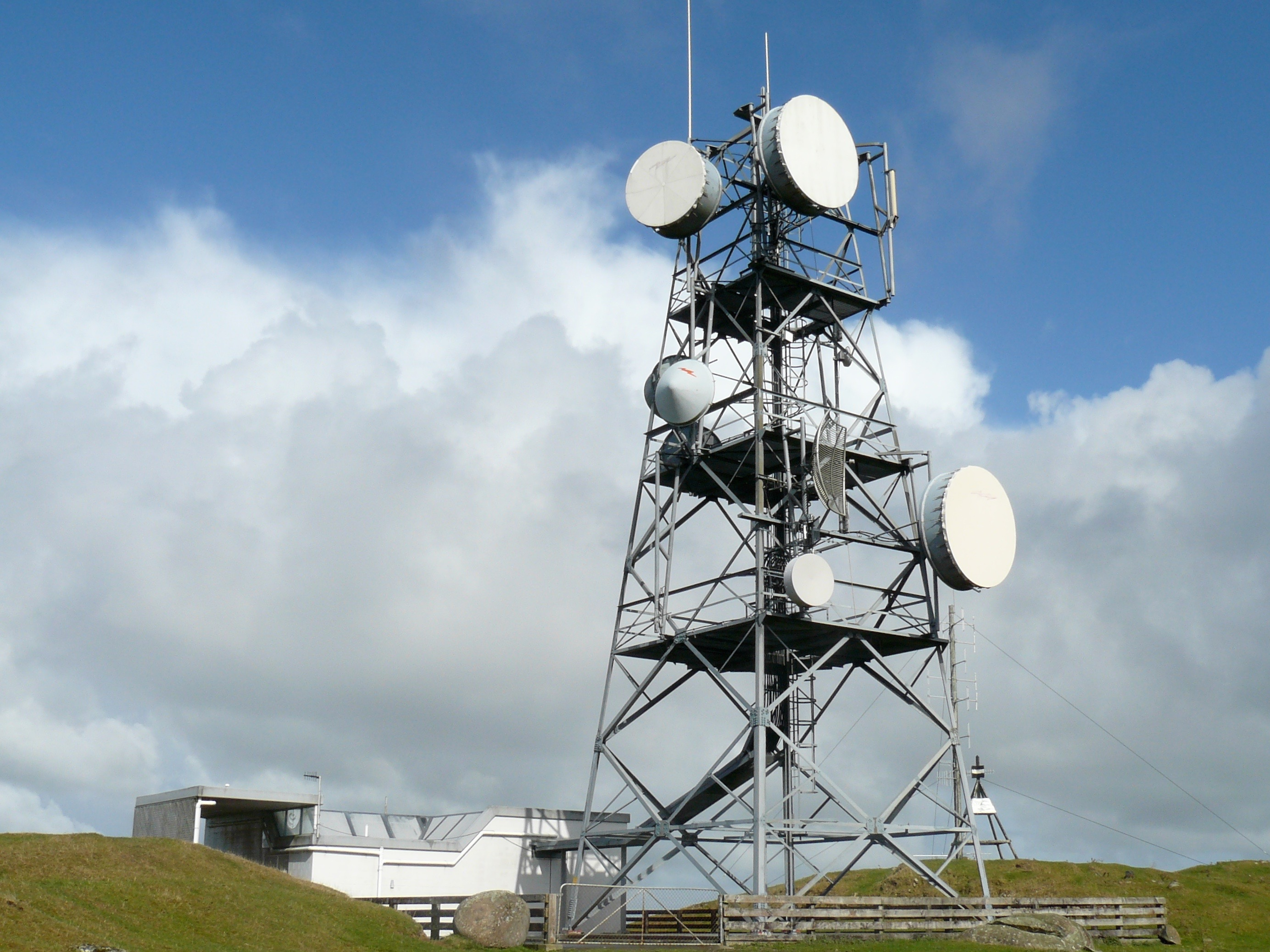
microwave tower beside trig point in 2009

From the 1970s a microwave tower has been on the crest of the hill overlooking Te Uku. It is now also part of a smart metering network. There is also a VHF repeater near the tower.

== See also ==
- List of power stations in New Zealand
- Wind power in New Zealand
- Pakoka River - photo of wind farm and item on mitigation work.

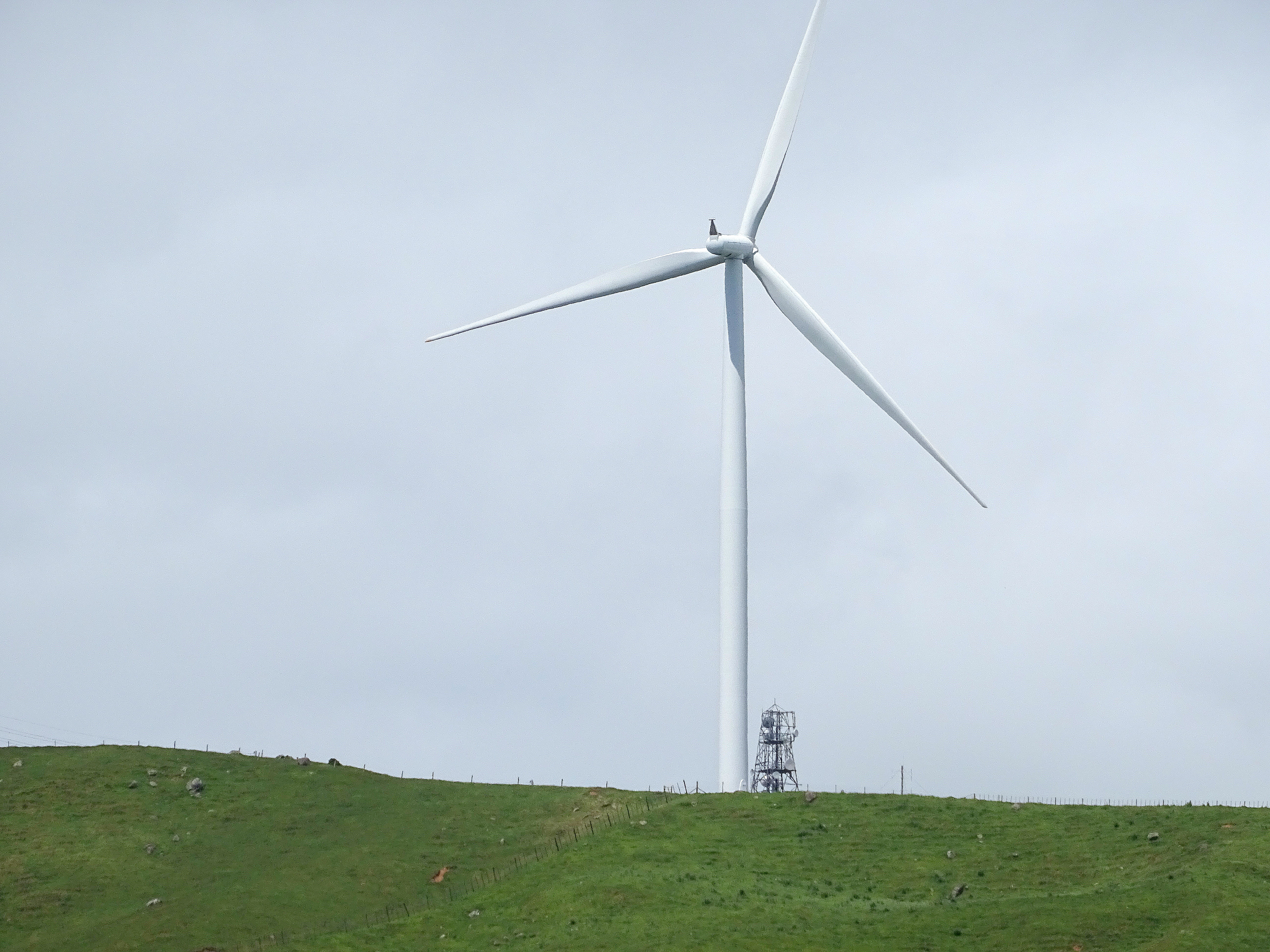
The 1950s microwave tower is dwarfed by the 130m high turbine
