= Bridal Veil Falls (Waikato) =

Wairēinga / Bridal Veil Falls
- Māori: Wairēinga
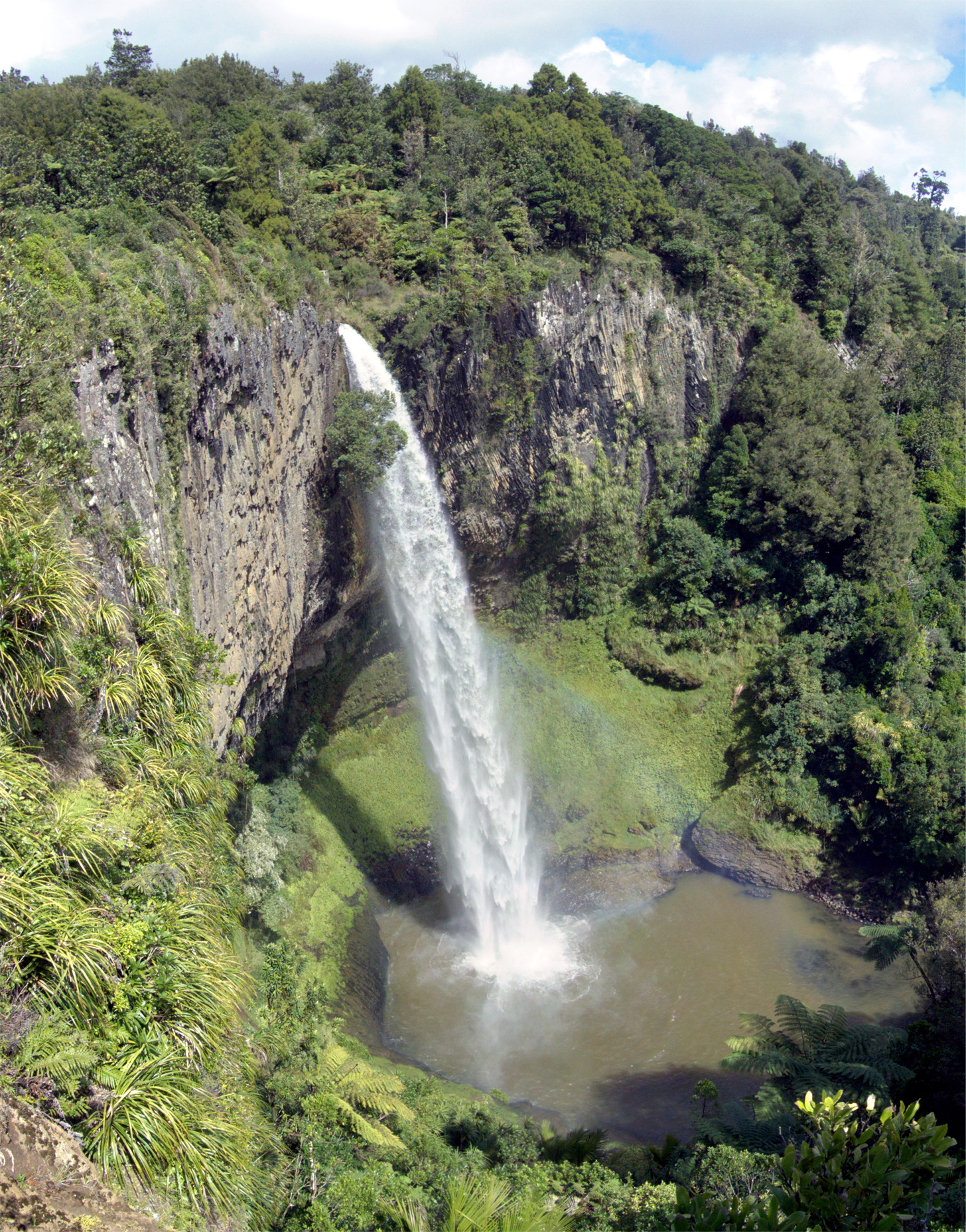
- Bridal Veil Falls, as seen from the second lookout.
- Interactive map of Wairēinga / Bridal Veil Falls
- Location: Waikato, New Zealand
- Coordinates: 37.908518°S 174.896636°E
- Type: Plunge
- Total height: 55 metres (180 ft)
- Watercourse: Pakoka River

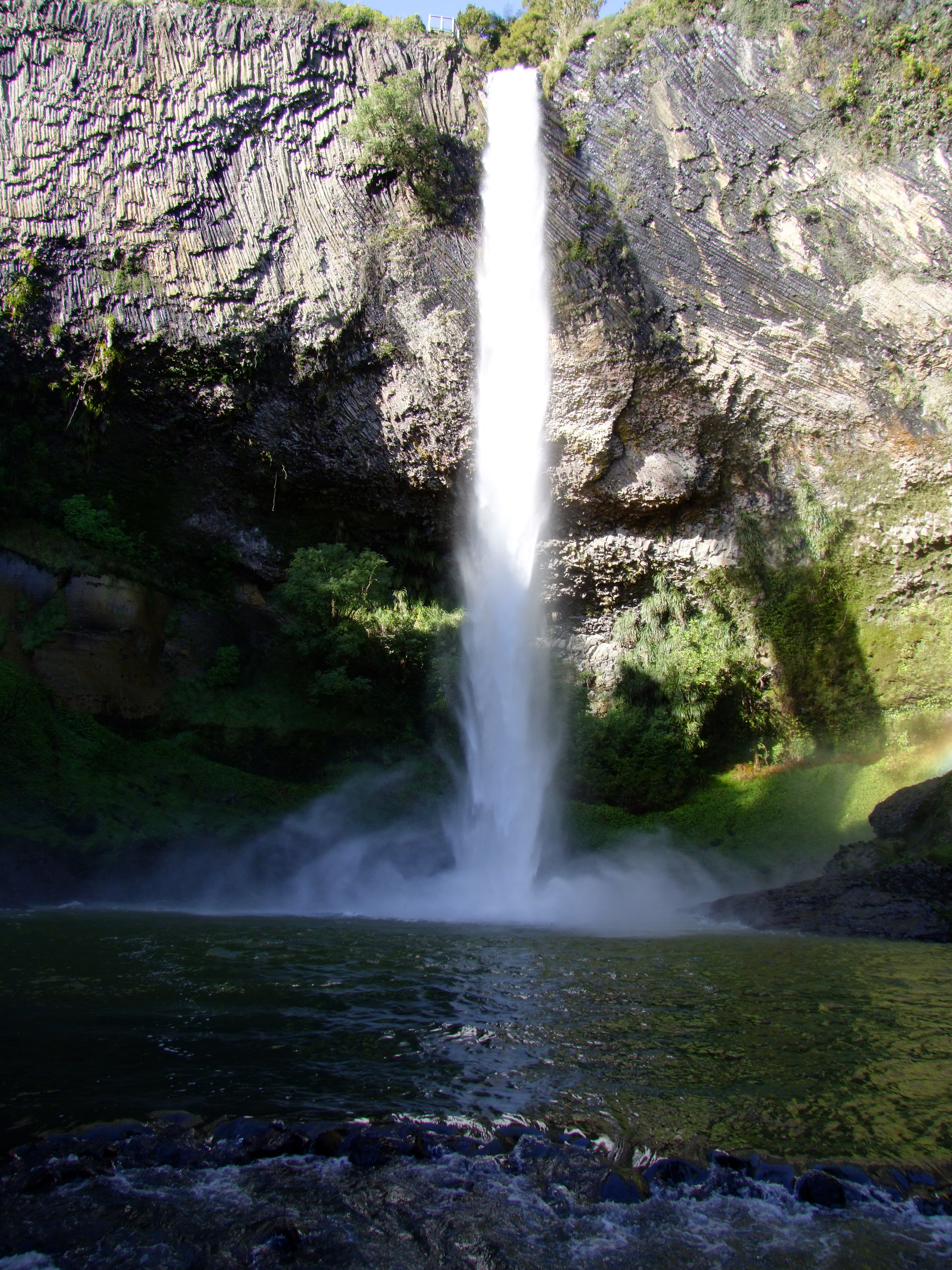
The Bridal Veil Falls from the bottom

Bridal Veil Falls (officially Wairēinga / Bridal Veil Falls; Māori: Wairēinga) is a plunge waterfall located along the Pakoka River in the Waikato area of New Zealand. The waterfall is 55 m (180 ft) high, and has over time caused the formation of a large pool at the base of the waterfall. The falls are in the 217 ha (540 acres) Wairēinga Scenic Reserve (created in 1884) with tawa-dominated forest.

== Formation ==
The water cascades over a basalt cliff, formed by volcanic activity, when an Okete Volcanics vent, on the 226 m (741 ft) hill just to the north, erupted 2.57 million years ago and blocked the valley.

== Access and recreational activities ==
Approximately 15 minutes from the nearby town of Raglan, the falls are an easy 10-minute walk through native bush, along the Pakoka River. Facilities include parking, long-drop toilets and four lookout platforms. River crossings are bridged. It is a steep descent to the falls base by 261 steps cut into a well maintained path.

400m beyond Bridal Veil car park, where Kawhia Rd becomes gravel, is the start of the 6 km Pipiwharauroa Way walking and cycling track.

=== Swimming and rock climbing ===
- The pool should not be swum in as water quality does not meet health standards for swimming.
- Abseiling and rock climbing are not permitted due to damage to endangered plant life (the threatened spider orchid Corybas “Kaitarakihi” (Corybas aff. rivularis)).

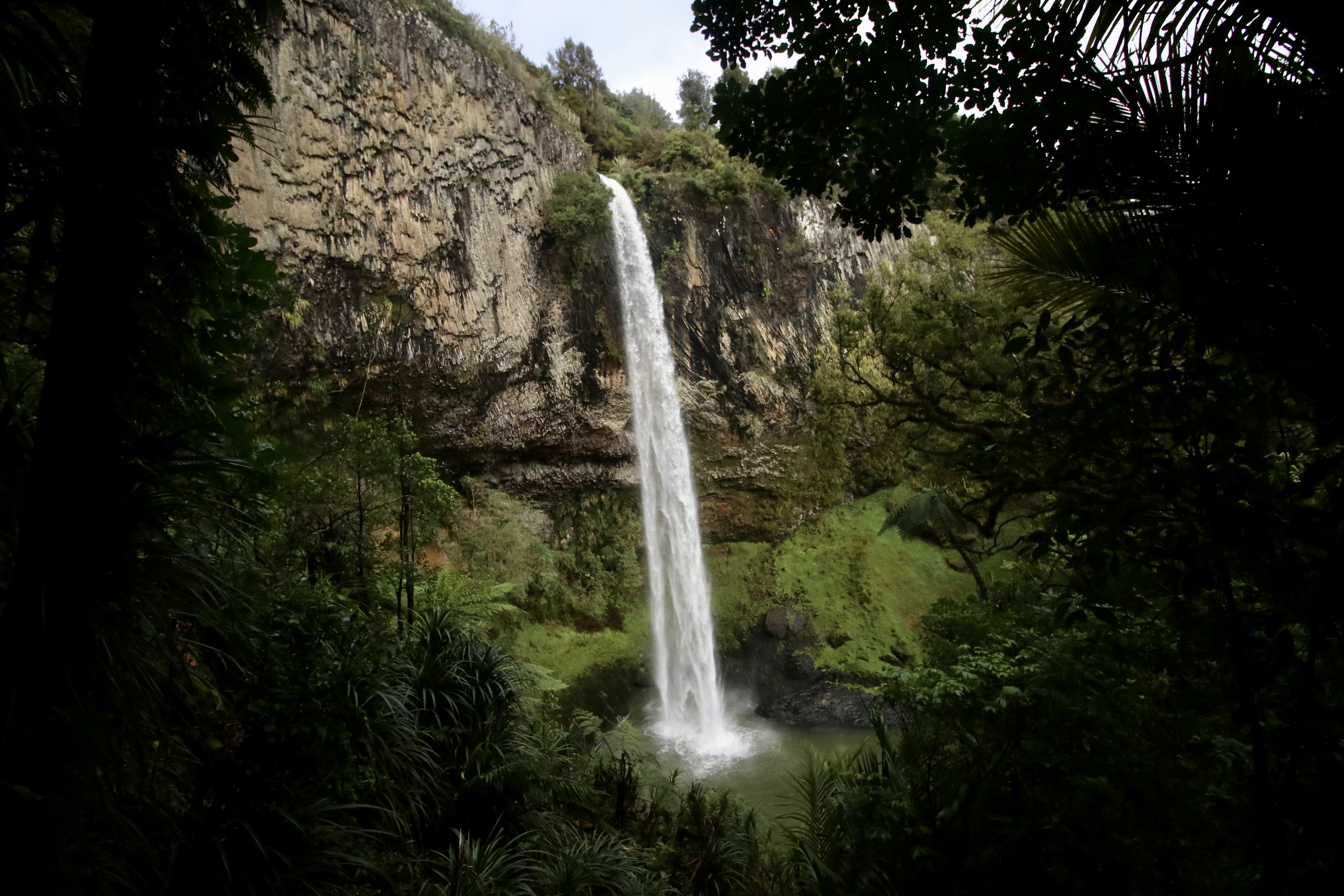
Wairēinga framed by native bush, as seen from the midway viewing platform

== See also ==
- List of waterfalls
- List of waterfalls in New Zealand
- Waterfall Formation
