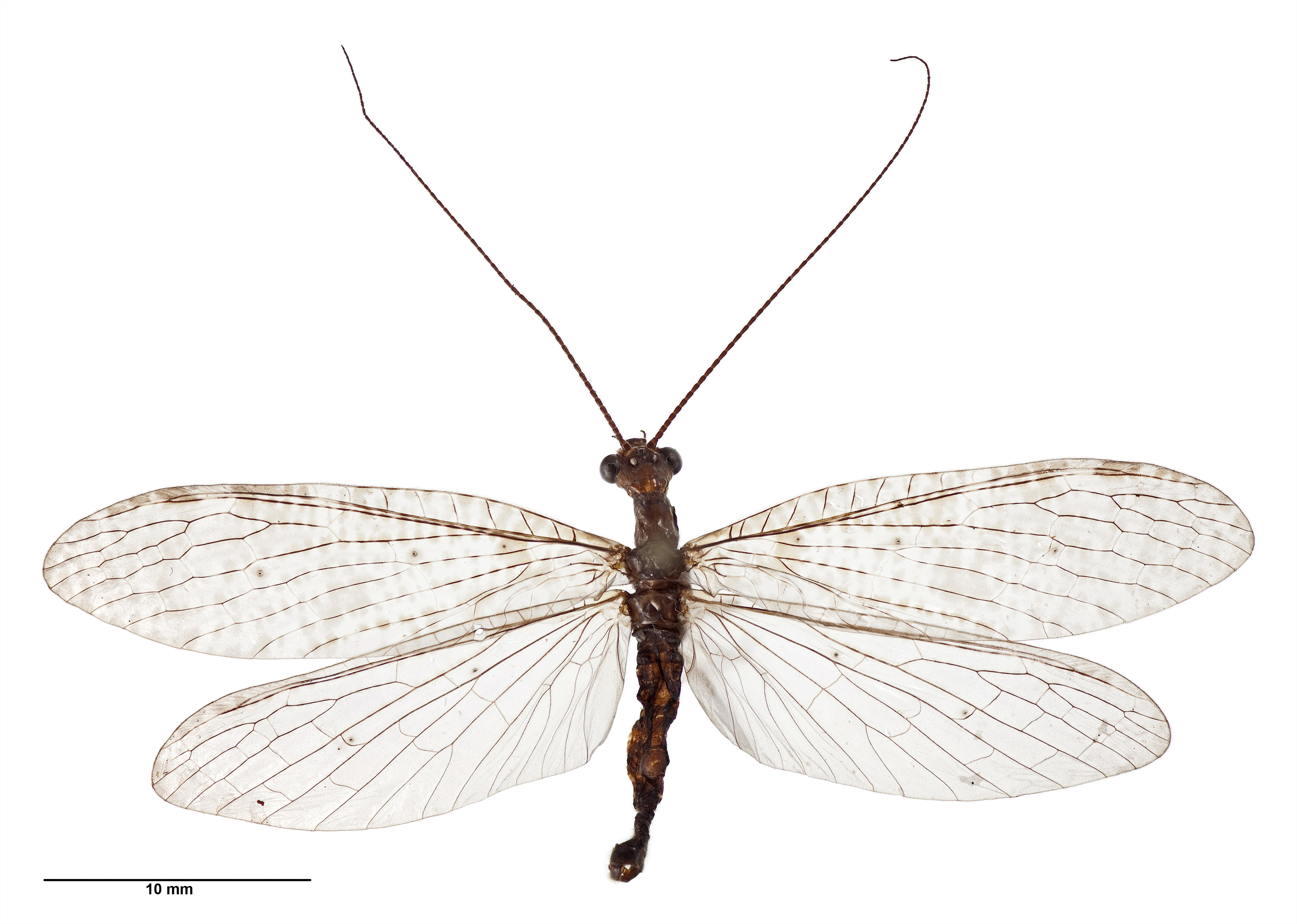
- Adult male
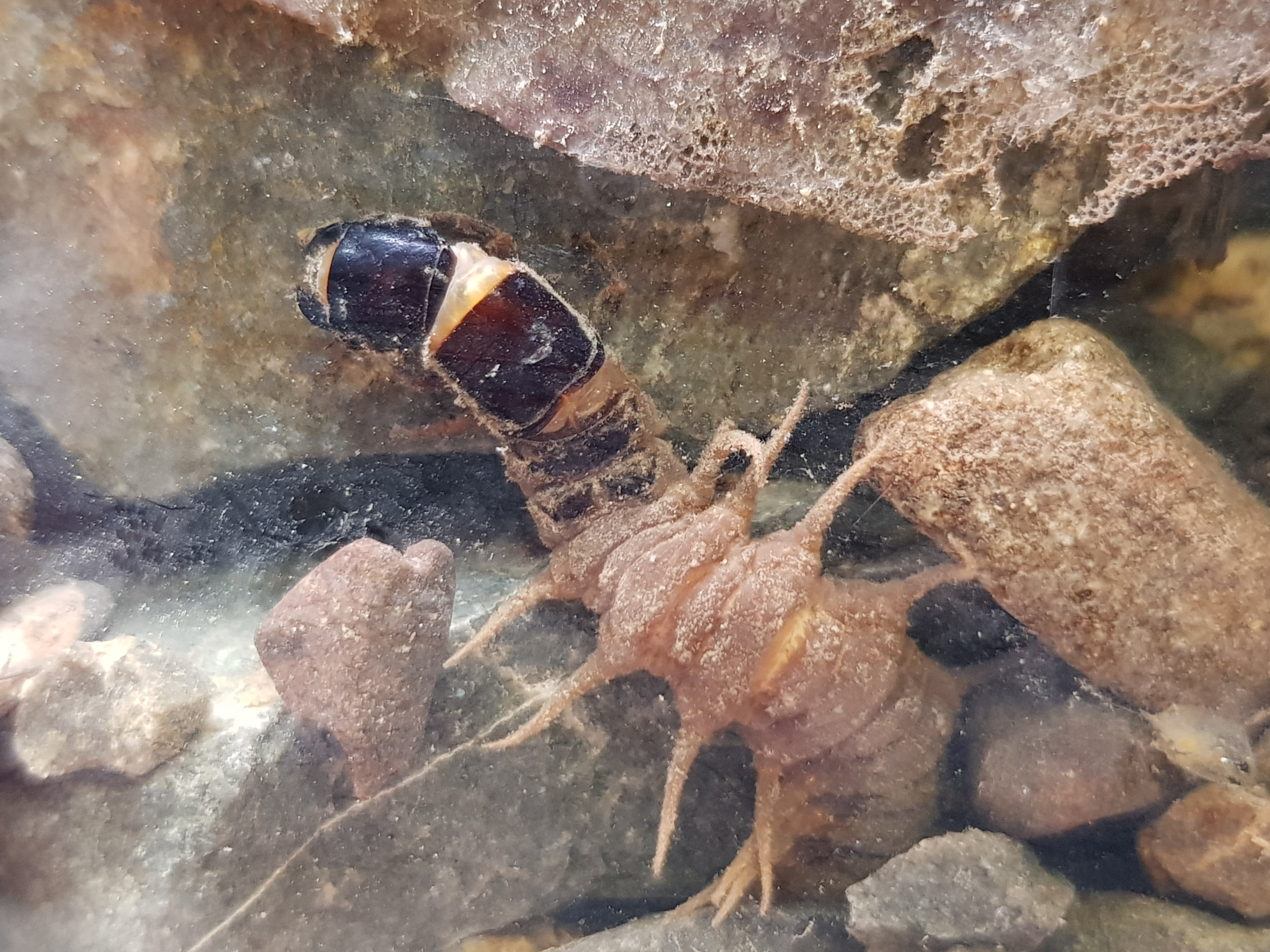
- Larva

Scientific classification
- Kingdom: Animalia
- Phylum: Arthropoda
- Clade: Pancrustacea
- Class: Insecta
- Order: Megaloptera
- Family: Corydalidae
- Genus: Archichauliodes
- Species: A. diversus

Binomial name
- Archichauliodes diversus Walker, 1853

= Archichauliodes diversus =

Species of insect

Archichauliodes diversus is an insect in the subfamily Chauliodinae - the fishflies, though it is often referred to as the New Zealand dobsonfly, despite not being a true dobsonfly. In its larval form it is commonly known by the name toe-biter, and its Māori name is puene. The species is native to New Zealand. Although there are many other species of fishfly in other parts of the world, Archichauliodes diversus is the only species of fishfly in New Zealand.

== Description ==
Archichauliodes larvae are one of the biggest freshwater insects in New Zealand. The thorax and head are black and flattened, and the head has a large set of mandibles. The larvae are sturdy animals with heavily sclerotised heads and thoracic segments. The abdomen is long and light in colour and it has 8 pairs of tentacle-like gills projecting from abdominal segments 1–8. Like other fishfly larvae they have anal prolegs with a pair of terminal hooks which they use to attach themselves to substrate, and they lack a terminal filament.

== Distribution ==
Archichauliodes diversus is the only member of the genus (and family) found in New Zealand where it is endemic and common throughout both the North and South Islands. It is common in streams nationwide, with moderate to good water quality, and has tolerance values of 7 (hard bottom sites) and 7.3 (soft bottom sites).

Archichauliodes diversus prefers stony or hard-bottom streams in bush covered and farmland areas. It also likes to have overhanging canopy/bush overhead for shelter, lifestyle and large rock pools. It thrives in good quality water.

== Life cycle/phenology ==
Archichauliodes diversus larvae are aquatic and the adults are terrestrial. It spends most of its life in the aquatic juvenile stage (2–5 years). The larvae leaves the stream between every molt, a unique feature of this species. It has a generation time of more than a year, and the adult are found near streams.

Archichauliodes diversus has many stages throughout its life, changing greatly not only in size but also in appearance as it progresses from egg, larval, prepupal, pupal and imaginal stages. A. diversus is nocturnal, most active at dusk and at night. The first stage of the life cycle is the egg which is light yellow and cylindrical in appearance and shape when it is first laid. It then turns colour when open to air to dark brown. This stage lasts around 30 days. Larvae are roughly around 2.2 mm when they hatch, and can grow to around 38.5 mm. It has 8 pairs of ‘gills’ that run down the abdomen which acts as the respiration system. This is the only documented stage during which it eats. This stage occurs all year round. In the third stage, the prepupa, it migrates towards the water edge or water banks. This phase occurs from early July to late January and lasts for 15 weeks. This is due to the water levels being at maximum height as the prepupa needs the soils to be saturated for the next life cycle stage to occur. The pupal stage lasts around 20–24 days. This time frame also depends on the sex, males taking longer than females. This occurs from late October to February. Although the pupa is similar to the adults, it has a bigger build and undeveloped wings. The colour changes in a matter of hours to days, starting out pale in colour then changing to dark brown. The last stage is the adult ("imago") stage, which only lives for roughly 6–10 days. In this stage, they spent most of their time resting in nearby trees. Before dying, the female lays several hundred eggs in irregular masses on nearby trees, scrubs, and rocks.

== Diet ==
Archichauliodes diversus larvae are predatory and use their large serrated mandibles to catch other aquatic invertebrates, especially mayflies, such as Aoteapsyche and Atalophlebioides. They are mostly active at night and they ambush prey around the center of riffles where there is a lot of oxygen and the turbulence stirs up prey, with the main food source being mayfly naiads, though they will eat nearly anything smaller, including members of their own species. Invertebrate predators such as Archichauliodes diversus are competitors with fish, since they eat many of the same prey animals, e.g. Ephemeroptera, which are an important food source for fish in streams.

== Predators, parasites, and diseases ==
Known species that prey on Archichauliodes diversus include Brown trout and Galaxiidae (incl. Galaxias). The larval stage is at risk of predation by caddisfly larvae and stonefly larvae. Spiders, such as lycosids, and beetles are also a risk for pupae and pre-pupal stages, as are birds.

The biggest threat to this species is human habitat alteration, by removing overhanging bush and trees from the waterways. This has a significant negative impact as it is a critical part in the life cycle, though A. diversus is not regarded as a ‘clean-water’ taxon.
