= Double line automatic signalling =

Double Line Automatic Signalling is a form of railway signalling used on the majority of double line sections in New Zealand. Double Line Automatic Signalling uses track circuits to detect the presence of trains in sections broken up by intermediate signals. Usually there is an 'up' and a 'down' main line, and beyond station limits the lines are not bi-directionally signalled. DLAS is not designed for wrong-line running in emergency situations.

== Junctions or points ==
At junctions or points, one of or both mains signals are usually controlled either remotely (by a Train Controller or Signalmen) or switched in at a local panel.

== Sidings ==
Sidings off one or both mains are usually operated by switchlock lever points secured by padlock and track circuit presence that enables a release to be given before points can be operated.

== Areas of use ==
- Papakura - Amokura
- Te Kauwhata - Hamilton.
- Trentham - Kaiwharawhara
- Kaiwharawhara - South Junction
- North Junction - Waikanae
- Islington - Heathcote

== Formerly double line ==
- Islington - Rolleston
- Mosgiel - St Leonards
