= Aotea Harbour =

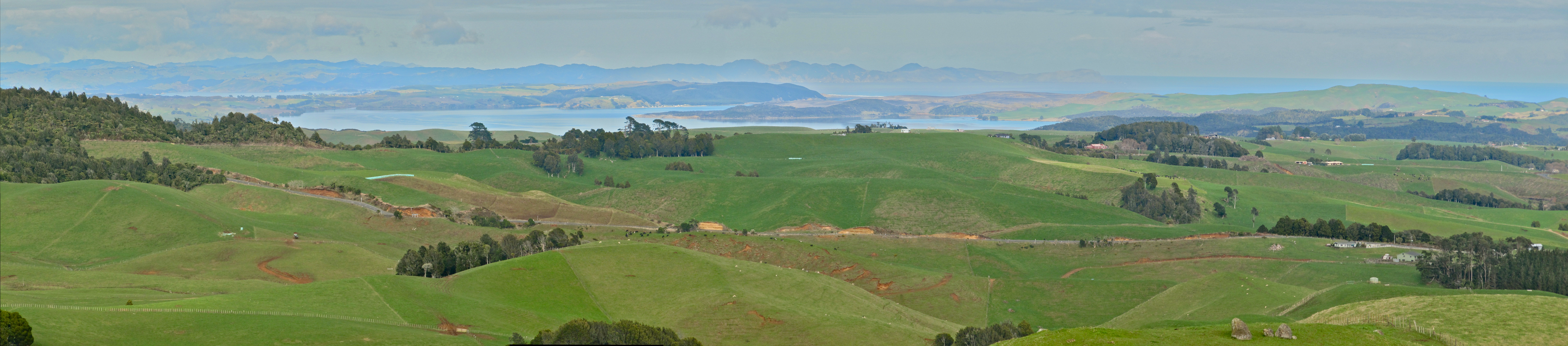
- Aotea Harbour and Taranaki (150km away faint towards right) from Houchens Rd, Te Mata

- Location within North Island
- Coordinates: 37.97463°S 174.83980°E
- Country: New Zealand
- Region: Waikato region
- Districts: Waikato District; Ōtorohanga District

Population
  - Total: 1,896 (2,013)
- River sources: Pakoka River
- Ocean/sea sources: Tasman Sea
- Basin countries: New Zealand
- Max. length: 6 km (3.7 mi)
- Max. width: 6 km (3.7 mi)
- Surface area: 31.9 km2 (12.3 sq mi)

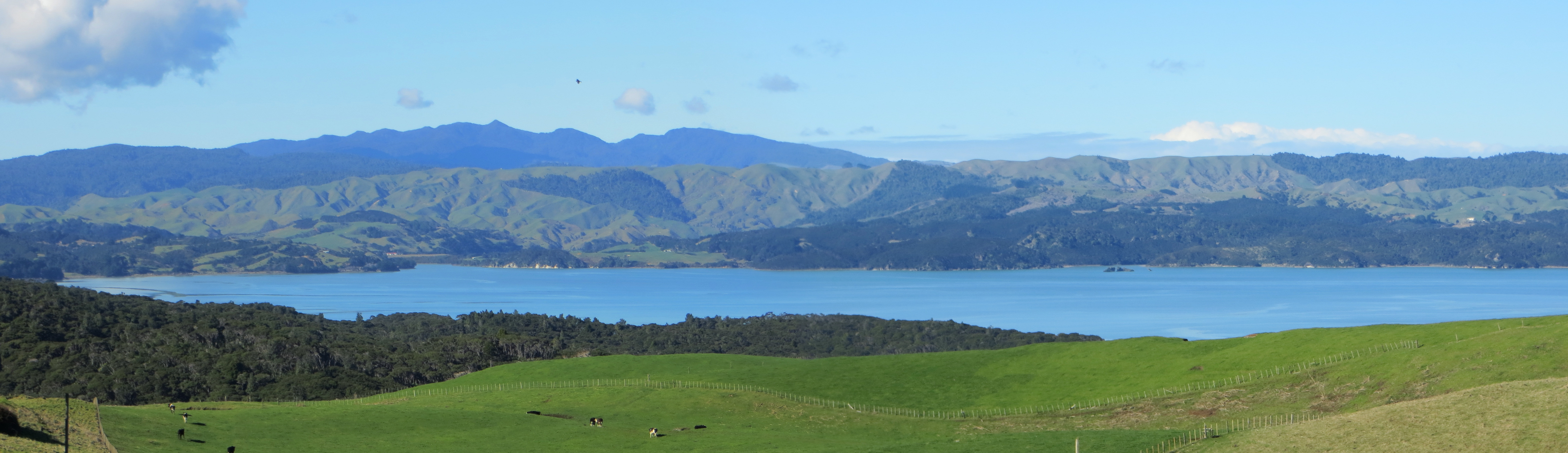
View from Phillips Rd toward Mount Pirongia.

Aotea Harbour (Māori: Aotea Moana) is a settlement and smallest of three large natural inlets in the Tasman Sea coast of the Waikato region of New Zealand's North Island. It is located between Raglan Harbour to the north and Kawhia Harbour to the south, 30 kilometres southwest of Hamilton.

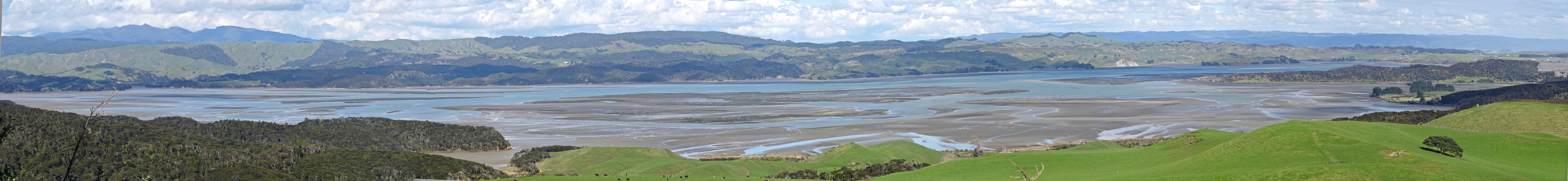
Looking southwest from Phillips Rd

== Geography ==
Aotea Harbour is a drowned valley system following the post glacial Aranuian sea level rise of over 100m in the last 14,000 years, but its level may also be influenced by the Makomako and Te Maari faults. It has a high-tide area of 32 km^{2} (12 mi^{2}) and a low-tide area of 6 km^{2} (2.3 mi^{2}).

Most higher ground around the harbour is formed from Jurassic era graywacke stone, while the Aotea Harbour north head were formed from Quaternary marine deposits, wind blown north-east from the Tasman Sea.

54% of the area around the harbour is in sheep and beef grazing. Since 1850 native forest cover has declined from 98% to 28%, about 18% managed by the Department of Conservation.

Waireinga/Bridal Veil Falls is located on Pakoka River, and Lake Disappear is on Pakihi Stream, both of which flow into Aotea Harbour.

=== Wildlife ===
Most of the land surrounding the Aotea Harbour is grassland with occasional pōhutukawa trees; however, archaeological charcoal evidence shows the presence of some tawa, rimu and kanuka trees, alongside Hebe and Coprosma shrubs. In the present day, some common plants found around the harbour are Cotula coronopifolia, Sarcocornia quinqueflora, Avicennia marina, Apodasmia similis, Selliera radicans, Plagianthus divaricatus, Paspalum vaginatum, Samolus repens, Juncus kraussii, Zostera novazelandica, Austrostipa stipoides, Isolepis cernua, Spartina anglica, Schoenoplectus pungens, Baumea juncea, Cordyline australis, Olearia solandri, Dacrycarpus dacrydioides, Leptospermum scoparium, Bolboschoenus fluviatilis, Coprosma propinqua, Cortaderia selloana, Cortaderia jubata and Typha orientalis.

Birds recorded in the harbour include white faced heron, South Island oyster catcher, godwit, pied stilt, black backed gull, red billed gull, swan, Canada goose, spur-winged plover, New Zealand dotterel, Royal spoonbill, kingfisher, pied shag, fernbird, paradise duck, Caspian tern, white-fronted tern and gannet.

The commonest fish species in the harbour are anchovy, flounder and yellow-eyed mullet. Shellfish species found in the harbour include Pipi and cockles.

Orca, bottlenose and common dolphin occasionally enter the harbour.

== History ==
According to traditional history, the harbour is the final landing place for the Aotea waka. Migrants from the Aotea waka are said to have brought karaka trees to the area when they settled. People aboard the 'Tainui waka settled around the Aotea Harbour, Kawhia Harbour and Whaingaroa Harbour (Raglan Harbour) in approximately 1350. Over 100 Māori archaeological sites are found around the harbour, dating to the 15th and 16th centuries. Many found on the Aotea Harbour north head, such as Koreromaiwaho Paa, were covered with Aeolian sand, blown due to the prevailing south-westerly wind. The people who settled around Aotea Harbour traditionally cultivated kumara, while collecting tuatua from the Tasman Sea, and pipi and cockles from the harbour. The harbour was the site of a seven generational war between Ngāti Māhanga and Ngāti Tū-irirangi.

By the early 1800s, the Aotea Harbour area had been settled by Tainui iwi including Ngāti Māhanga, Ngāti Te Wehi, Ngāti Mahuta, Ngāti Koata and Ngāti Toa. Conflict between Tainui iwi led by Pōtatau Te Wherowhero and Ngāti Toa, led to Ngāti Toa settling Kapiti Island and the Kāpiti Coast in the 1820s, while their allies, the Ngāti Koata, settled around the northern shore of the South Island (in the Tasman, Nelson and Marlborough regions). In the 1880s described as the north-western edge of the Te Rohe Pōtae (King Country lands).

== Marae ==
Several Waikato Tainui marae are located around Aotea Harbour. Te Tihi o Moerangi Marae and meeting house are affiliated with Ngāti Mahuta and Ngāti Te Weehi. Mōtakotako Marae and Te Ōhākī a Mahuta meeting house are affiliated with Ngāti Mahuta, Ngāti Te Weehi and Tainui Hapū. Te Papatapu or Te Wehi Marae and Pare Whakarukuruku meeting house are affiliated with Ngāti Mahuta and Ngāti Te Weehi.

== Demographics ==
The meshblocks around the edge of the harbour had these census results -

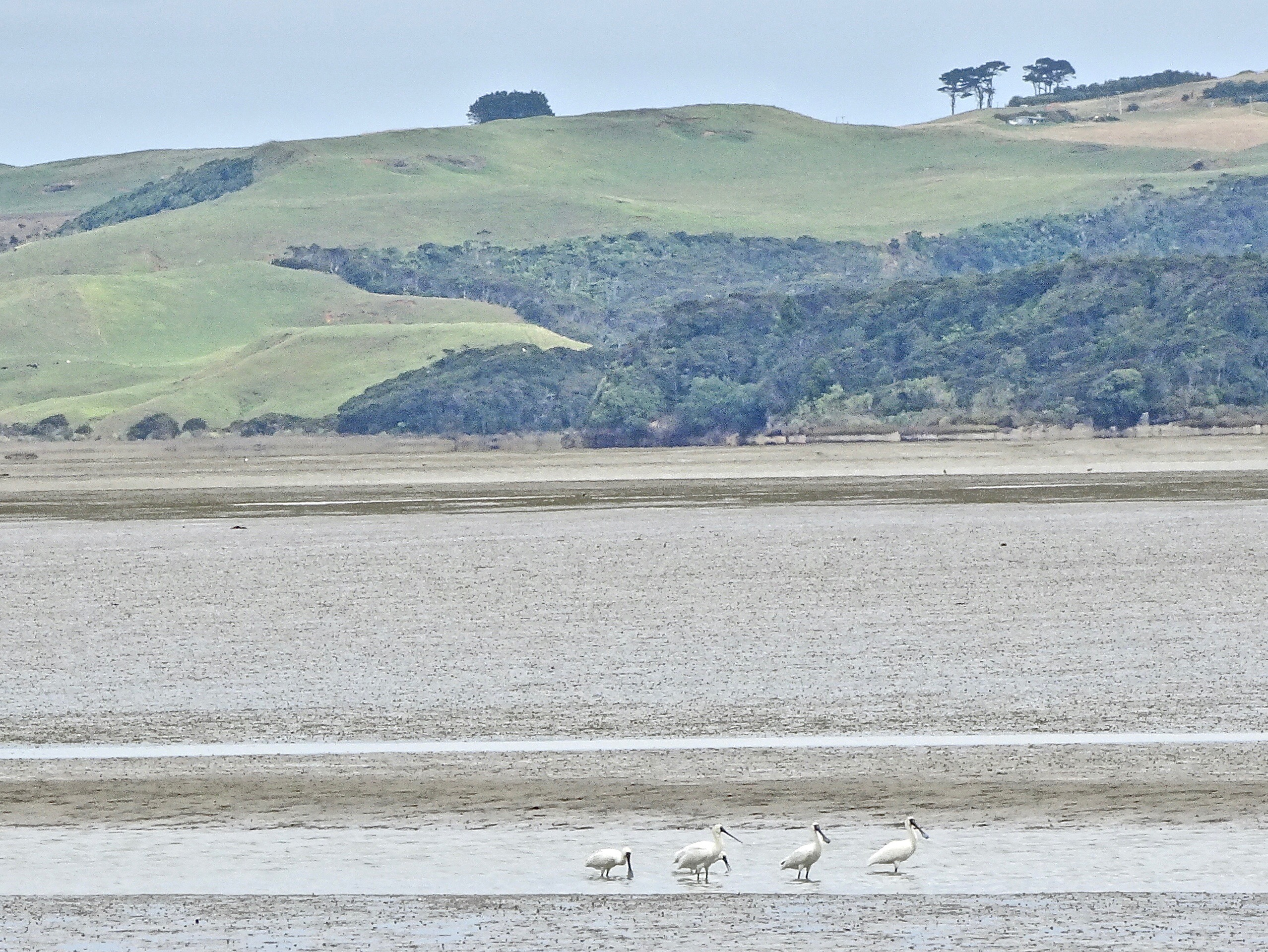
Spoonbills can often be seen feeding in the channels between the mud flats

Year	Population	Households	Median age	Median income
992702 Lake Parangi
2001	45	15	22.2	11,700
2006	33	12	20	20,800
2013	33	15	49.7	17,500
0992701 Aotea village
2001	51	24	65.5	12,500
2006	36	15	56	16,300
2013	42	24	62.2	21,300
992900 Okapu
2001	51	24	46.2	15,800
2006	51	18	35	17,500
2013	51	18	49.2	15,300
0862100 Makomako
2001	36	12	13.7	12,500
2006	24	9	38	12,500
2013	24	9	45.2	20,800
862000 Te Papatapu
2001	57	21	30.2	13,800
2006	54	21	36	25,800
2013	48	18	42.8	23,300
861800 Makaka
2001	57	15	37.5	12,500
2006	69	21	34	15,400
2013	60	24	41.5	20,800
Total harbour edge meshblocks				national median $
2001	297	111		18,500
2006	267	96		24,100
2013	258	108		27,900

The population was once much larger. For example, about 200 lived at Makaka in 1880.

== Roads ==
The harbour has few roads giving access to it. Aotea village and Okapu have a road linked to SH31, near Kawhia. A gravel road links SH31 to Makomako. Just north of Makomako, at Maari Stream, two roads link to Te Mata; Te Papatapu Rd follows the edge of the harbour for over 2 km (1.2 mi). Kawhia Rd runs east via Lake Disappear and Waireinga/Bridal Veil Falls. Phillips Rd branches from Te Papatapu Rd, giving access to some areas north of the harbour.

The beaches were initially a main route and were linked by boat across the harbour entrance.

About 1880 Te Papatapu Rd was built from Te Mata, but from Te Papatapu the route was across the harbour at low tide.

The bridges over the Maari and Makomako streams were built about 1918, though the road linking Kawhia and Te Mata was not usable until about 1926. They were replaced by concrete bridges in 1970.

When Makomako School was built in 1925, timber and other supplies were taken by road to Pakoka landing, but then rafted across the harbour and up the stream to a point near the school.

The roads were metalled in the 1930s.

From 1938 to 1952 public buses linked Kawhia and Raglan.

== Education ==
Makomako School was just above the junction of Makomako Road and the Te Mata-Kawhia Road. It was open from 26 October 1925 (with an initial roll of 31 girls and 16 boys) to 1981, or 1983. Makomako and the area north of it are now in the catchment area for Te Mata School, though the school buses only reach to Te Papatapu Road.

From 1899 to 1904 there was a school at Raoraokauere mission station.
