= Waikato Tainui =

Māori iwi (tribe) in Aotearoa New Zealand

- Māori tribal government
- Iwi's logo
- Tribe established: ~1350
- Māori king proclaimed: 1858
- Exiled to King Country: 1863
- Te Whakakitenga o Waikato (previously Te Kauhanganui) founded: 1889/1890
- Capital: Ngāruawāhia
- Marae: 68 marae

Government
  - Body: Te Whakakitenga o Waikato
  - Queen: Nga wai hono i te po
  - Executive Chair: Parekawhia Mclean

Area *
  - Total: 8,046 km^{2} (3,107 sq mi)

Population (2018)*
  - Total: 80,000
  - Density: 9.9/km^{2} (26/sq mi)
- Time zone: NZST
- Website: waikatotainui.com
- area of jurisdiction **Enrolled tribal members only

Waikato Tainui, Waikato or Tainui is a group of Māori iwi based in the Waikato Region, in the western central region of New Zealand's North Island. It is part of the larger Tainui confederation of Polynesian settlers who arrived to New Zealand on the Tainui waka (migration canoe). The tribe is named after the Waikato River, which plays a large part in its history and culture.

Pōtatau Te Wherowhero, the first Māori king, was a member of the Ngāti Mahuta hapu (sub-tribe) of Waikato iwi, and his descendants have succeeded him. The king movement is based at Tūrangawaewae marae (meeting place) in Ngāruawāhia.

The Waikato-Tainui iwi comprises 33 hapū (sub-tribes) and 68 marae (family groupings), with a population of over 80,000 tribal members who affiliate to it. In the 2023 New Zealand census, 47,664 people gave Waikato as an affiliation. Hamilton City is now the tribe's largest population centre, but Ngāruawāhia remains its historical centre and modern capital.

== Government ==
Waikato-Tainui's governing parliamentary body is Te Kauhanganui, a governing body of 204 tribal members – 3 members from each of the 68 marae. The marae are spread over a large area from Te Kūiti and Cambridge in the south to Auckland in the north.

The executive board is Te Arataura, which has 10 representatives elected from Te Kauhanganui and an 11th member appointed by the Māori king. The Waikato-Tainui tribal administration (or iwi authority) is the Waikato Raupatu Trustee Company Ltd, which replaced the Tainui Māori Trust Board, and is situated at Hopuhopu, Ngāruawāhia.

The Waikato iwi has been using the name Tainui to describe itself for some time, through the establishment of the Tainui Māori Trust Board by the Waikato-Maniapoto Maori Claims Settlement Act 1946, with many people now referring to the Waikato iwi as "Tainui" or "Waikato-Tainui".

There have traditionally been strong links between Tainui and the University of Waikato, which has strengths in Māori language and modern local history. The university also holds documents and objects related to the tribe.

== Hapū and marae ==
Waikato Tainui is made up of several iwi (tribes) and hapū (sub-tribes).

Each tribal group has marae (meeting grounds), which usually includes a wharenui (meeting house).

=== Ngāti Mahuta ===
The hāpu of Ngāti Mahuta is associated with 20 marae:

- 1 in Māngere Bridge: Te Puea Memorial Marae
- 3 near Te Kauwhata: Ōkarea marae, Taniwha marae and Matahuru Papakainga marae
- 1 in Rangiriri: Horahora marae
- 4 in and around Huntly: Te Ōhākī marae, Kaitumutumu marae, Te Kauri marae and Waahi marae
- 3 in and around Ngāruawāhia: Taupiri marae, Waikeri–Tangirau marae, and Tūrangawaewae marae
- 1 near Te Awamutu: Te Kōpua marae
- 4 around Aotea Harbour: Ōkapu marae, Mōtakotako (Taruke) marae, Te Papatapu (Te Wehi) marae and Te Tihi o Moerangi marae
- 3 around Kawhia Harbour: Maketū marae, Āruka marae and Te Kōraha marae

=== Ngāti Hikairo ===
The iwi of Ngāti Hikairo is associated with 4 marae:

- 3 around Kawhia Harbour: Waipapa Marae (hapū: Ngāti te uru, Ngāti Pokaia, Te Whanau pani, Ngāti Horotakere), Mokai kainga marae (hapū: Ngāti Te Mihinga, Ngāti Paretaiko), Kaiewe marae (hapū: Ngāti Puhiawe, Ngāti Hineue)
- 1 in Pirongia at Purekireki marae

=== Ngāti Te Wehi ===
The iwi of Ngāti Te Wehi is associated with 11 marae:

- 4 marae around Aotea Harbour: Ookapu marae, Mōtakotako (Taruke) marae, Te Papatapu (Te Wehi) marae and Te Tihi o Moerangi marae
- 4 marae around Kawhia Harbour:Raakaunui marae, Maketū marae, Āruka marae and Te Kōraha marae
- 2 marae in Ngāruawāhia: Tūrangawaewae marae and Waikeri – Tangirau marae

=== Ngāti Kuiaarangi, Ngāti Tai and Ngāti Whāwhākia ===
The hapū of Ngāti Tai, Ngāti Kuiaarangi and Ngāti Whāwhākia are associated with 8 marae:

- 4 marae in and around Huntly: Kaitumutumu marae, Te Kauri marae, Waahi marae and Te Ōhākī marae
- 2 marae near Te Kauwhata: Ōkarea marae and Taniwha marea in Waeranga
- 1 marae in Māngere Bridge: Te Puea Memorial Marae
- 1 marae in Taupiri: Taupiri marae

=== Tainui ===
The hapū of Tainui is associated with 7 marae:

- 4 marae east of Huntly: Te Ākau marae, Pukerewa marae, Te Poho o Tanikena marae and Weraroa marae
- 2 marae around Raglan Harbour: Poihākena marae and Te Kōpua marae
- 1 marae around Aotea Harbour: Mōtakotako (Taruke) marae

=== Ngāti Tāhinga ===
The hapū of Ngāti Tāhinga is associated with 6 marae:

- 2 marae in Port Waikato: Ngāti Tāhinga marae and Pakau marae
- 4 marae west of Huntly: Pukerewa, Te Ākau, Te Poho o Tanikena and Weraroa

=== Ngāti Apakura ===
The hapū of Ngāti Apakura is associated with 6 marae:

- 3 marae around Pirongia: Pūrekireki marae, Hīona marae and Te Kōpua
- 1 marae in Ōtorohanga: Kahotea marae
- 1 marae in Te Kūiti: Te Tokanganui a Noho

=== Ngāti Tiipa and Ngāti Āmaru ===
The hāpu of Ngāti Tiipa and Ngāti Āmaru are associated with 6 marae:

- 2 marae in Tuakau: Ngā Tai e Rua marae and Tauranganui marae
- 4 marae at Port Waikato: Pakau marae, Te Awamārahi marae, Te Kotahitanga marae and Tikirahi marae

=== Ngāti Hauā ===
The hāpu of Ngāti Hauā is associated with 5 marae:

- 3 marae in and around Morrinsville: Kai a Te Mata marae, Raungaiti mare and Rukumoana marae
- 2 marae in Hamilton: Te Iti a Hauā (Tauwhare) marae and Waimakariri marae

=== Ngāti Korokī and Ngāti Raukawa ===
The hapū of Ngāti Korokī and Ngāti Raukawa are associated with 5 marae:

- 2 marae south-east of Te Awamutu: Rāwhitiroa (Ōwairaka) marae in Parawera and Aotearoa marae in Wharepapa South
- 2 marae near Lake Karapiro: Maungatautari marae in Maungatautari and Pōhara marae in Arapuni
- 1 marae near Tokoroa: Ngātira marae in Kinleith

=== Ngāti Māhanga and Ngāti Tamainupō ===
The hapū of Ngāti Māhanga and Ngāti Tamainupō are associated with 4 marae:

- 2 marae around Raglan Harbour: Te Kaharoa (Aramiro) in Raglan and Waingaro marae in Waingaro
- 2 marae near Whatawhata: Ōmaero marae and Te Papa o Rotu (Te Oneparepare) marae

=== Ngāi Tai, Ngāti Koheriki, and Ngāti Tamaoho ===
The hapū of Ngāi Tai, Ngāti Koheriki, and Ngāti Tamaoho are associated with 5 marae:

- Marae Kirikiri marae in Pōkeno
- Tamaoho marae in Mangatangi
- Ngā Hau e Whā marae in Pukekohe
- Umupuia marae in Duders Beach
- Whātāpaka marae in Te Hihi

=== Ngāti Hine, Ngāti Naho and Ngāti Pou ===
The hapū of Ngāti Hine, Ngāti Naho and Ngāti Pou are associated with 4 marae:

- Waikare marae at Te Kauwhata
- Horahora marae at Rangiriri
- Matahuru Papakainga marae at Ohinewai
- Maurea marae at Te Ōhakī

=== Ngāti Te Ata and Ngāti Paretaua ===
The hapū of Ngāti Te Ata and Ngāti Paretaua are associated with 4 marae:

- 2 marae on the Awhitu Peninsula: Reretēwhioi marae and Tāhuna marae

=== Ngāti Taratikitiki ===
The hapū of Ngāti Te Ata and Ngāti Paretaua are associated with 4 marae:

- 1 marae in Te Kauwhata: Waikare marae
- 1 marae in Rangiriri: Horahora marae
- 2 marae east of Huntly: Maurea marae and Te Poho o Tanikena marae

=== Ngāti Makirangi ===
The hapū of Ngāti Makirangi has no marae of its own, but is associated with 4 marae:

- 2 marae near Taupiri: Hukanui marae and Tauhei marae
- 1 marae near Rangiriri: Waiti (Raungaunu) marae
- 1 marae near Tahuna: Hoe o Tainui marae

=== Ngāti Wairere ===
Ngaati Wairere is associated with 2 marae:

- Hukanui marae north of Hamilton
- Tauhei marae north of Morrinsville

=== Other hapū ===
- Ngāti Ngutu, based at Mangatoatoa marae in Te Awamutu and Rākaunui marae near Kawhia
- Ngāti Paretekawa, based at Mangatoatoa marae in Te Awamutu and Rākaunui marae in Hauturu
- Ngāti Pātupō
- Ngāti Puhiawe, based at Waipapa marae in Kawhia
- Ngāti Ruru, based at Pārāwera marae near Te Awamutu
- Ngāti Werokoko, based at Pārāwera marae near Te Awamutu
- Te Ākitai Waiohua, based at Makaurau marae in Mangere
