= Ngāti Koata =

Māori iwi (tribe) in Aotearoa New Zealand

- Iwi (tribe) in Māoridom
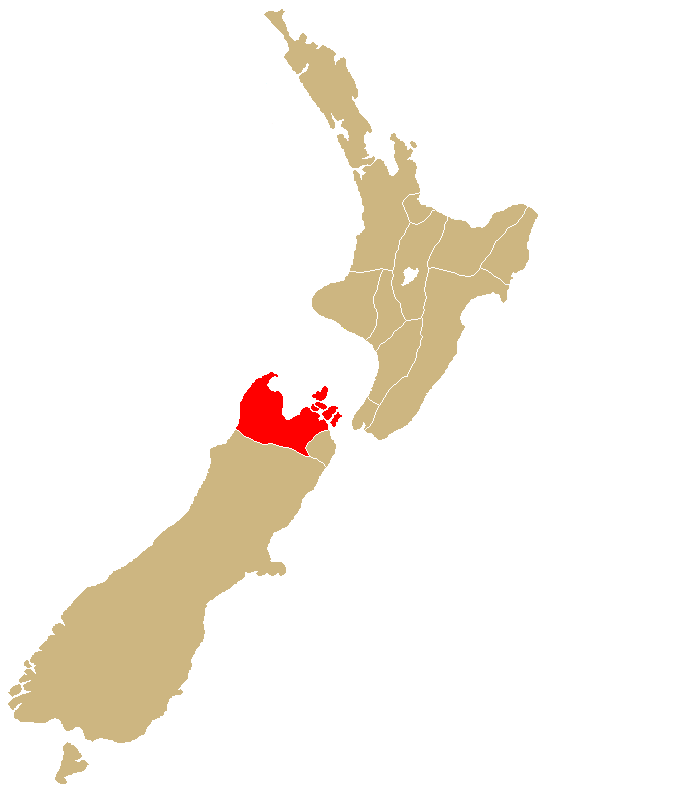
- Rohe (region): Te Tau Ihu
- Waka (canoe): Tainui
- Website: www.ngatikoata.com

Ngāti Koata or Ngāti Kōata is a Māori iwi of New Zealand, originating on the west coast of Waikato, but now mainly at the northern tip of South Island.

Ngāti Koata whakapapa back to Koata who lived near Kāwhia in the 17th century. She had two sons, Kāwharu and Te Wehi (founder of Ngāti Te Wehi). Te Totara pa on the south shore of Kāwhia was shared with Ngāti Toa in the early 19th century. Following the musket wars, many of the iwi moved south to Kapiti Island and then Te Tau Ihu in the mid 1820s.

Claims to land were considered by Parliament in 1929 and 1936. The latter related to land at Wakapuaka and the role of Te Rauparaha.

13 pa sites in the area of Raglan, Te Uku, Te Ākau, Ruapuke and Aotea have been associated with Ngāti Koata.

The Ngāti Koata Trust was formed after signing the iwi's $11.76m. The tribe's Deed of Settlement was signed at Whakatū Marae in Nelson on 20 December 2012.

Ngāti Koata logo was designed and gifted to the iwi by Puhanga Tupaea.

== See also ==
- List of Māori iwi
