= Amokura railway station =

Defunct railway station in New Zealand

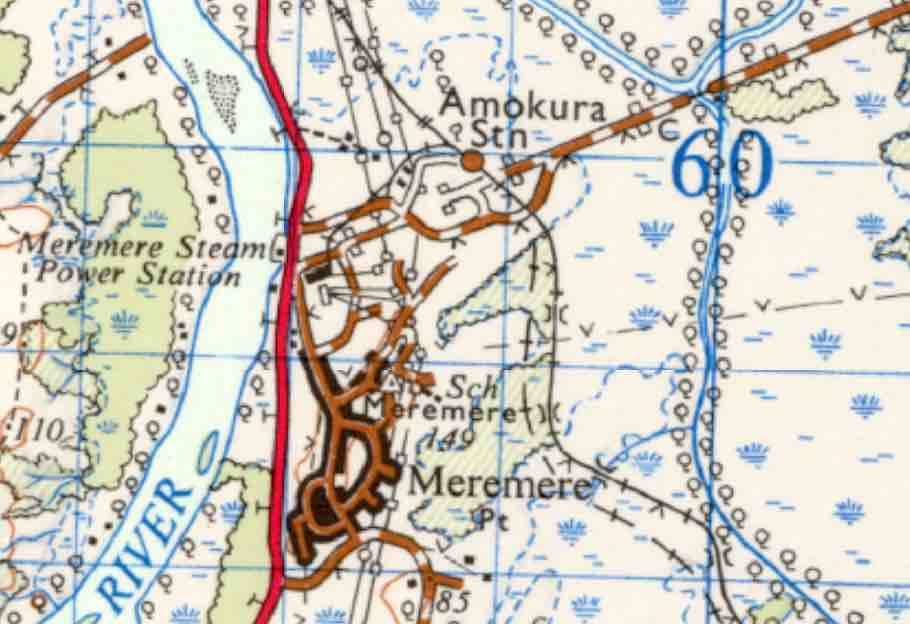
- 1961 Amokura railway station on Sheet N52 one inch map

General information
- Location: Island Block Road, Meremere, New Zealand
- Coordinates: 37.309°S 175.076°E
- Elevation: 7 m (23 ft)
- Line: North Island Main Trunk
- Distance: Wellington 604.43 km (375.58 mi)
- Tracks: double to north single to south

History
- Opened: 1929
- Closed: 1980

Services
Preceding station	Historical railways	Following station
Mercer; Line open, station closed 4.63 km (2.88 mi)	North Island Main Trunk; KiwiRail	Whangamarino; Line open, station closed 6.19 km (3.85 mi)
Location

Amokura railway station was a station on the North Island Main Trunk in the Waikato region of New Zealand, 604.62 km (375.69 mi) from Wellington. It is at the north end of a 13 km (8.1 mi) single line section extending to Te Kauwhata. Doubling of that section is being investigated in a business case from July 2021.

Sources differ as to the opening date. One says opening was on 20 October 1929 for goods and 11 November 1929 for passengers. Another says 13 August 1877 and that the line was doubled from 1 July 1956. A siding was gazetted with the name Amokura in January 1929 and a 1930 article implied it was new. It was also known c.1929 as Ngatikoi or Raumoa. A crossing loop was closed on 13 May 1963. at that time there was a proposal to combine it with Meremere station, as they were only a chain (22 yd (20 m)) apart and Meremere was larger and better known.

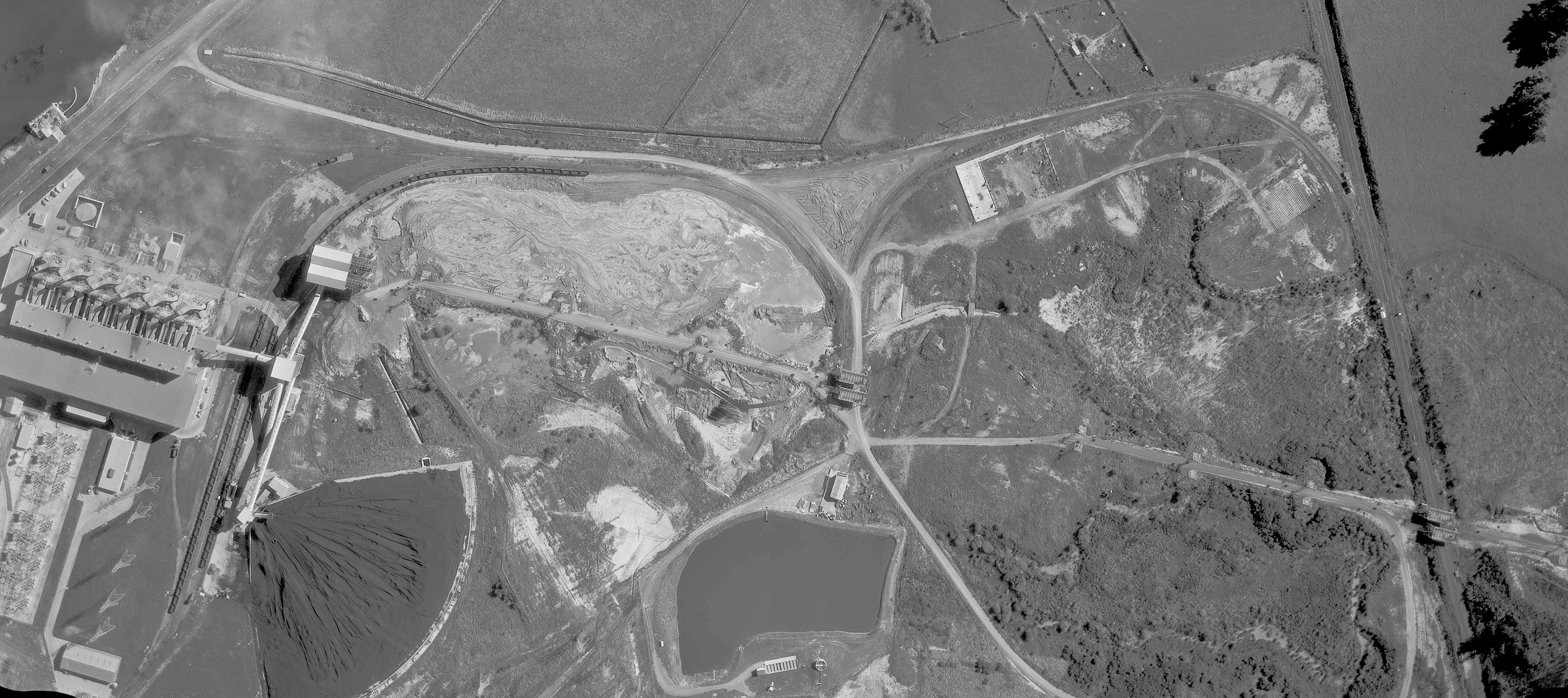
SN1532 aerial view of Meremere power station, bucket line and Amokura railway station in 1963
