= Rangiriri =

Settlement in Waikato, New Zealand

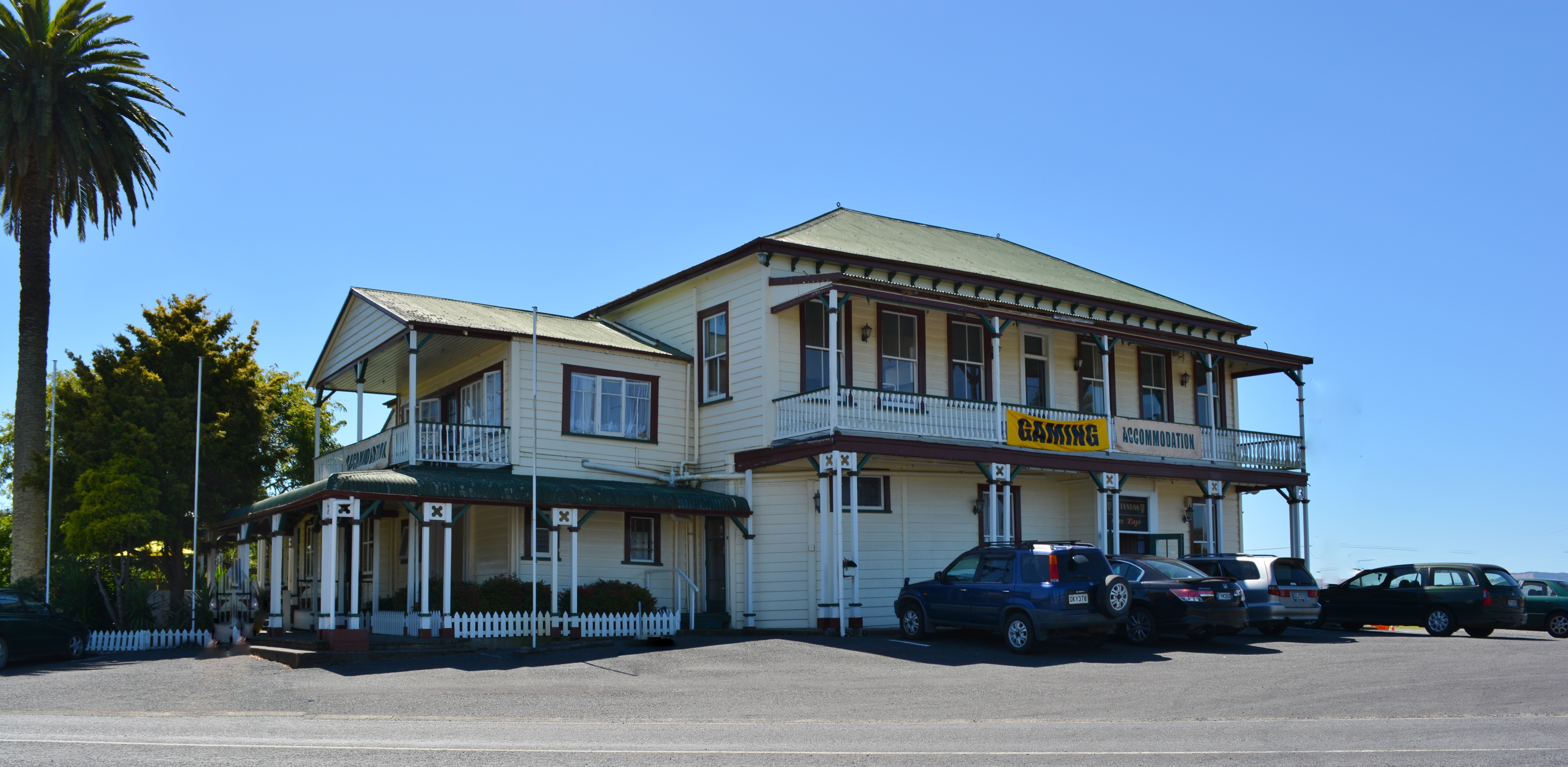
- Rangiriri Pub
- Interactive map of Rangiriri
- Coordinates: 37.429°S 175.132°E
- Country: New Zealand
- Region: Waikato
- District: Waikato District
- Wards: Waerenga-Whitikahu General Ward; Tai Raro Takiwaa Maaori Ward
- Electorates: Port Waikato; Hauraki-Waikato (Māori)

Government
  - Territorial Authority: Waikato District Council
  - Regional council: Waikato Regional Council
  - Mayor of Waikato: Aksel Bech
  - Port Waikato MP: Andrew Bayly
  - Hauraki-Waikato MP: Hana-Rawhiti Maipi-Clarke

Area
  - Total: 7.10 km^{2} (2.74 sq mi)

Population (2023 Census)
  - Total: 90
  - Density: 13/km^{2} (33/sq mi)

Rangiriri is a rural community in the Waikato District and Waikato region of New Zealand's North Island. It is located on the Waikato River near Lake Waikare in the Waikato District. State Highway 1 now bypasses Rangiriri.

Rangiriri was the site of a major Māori defence structure during the time of the Invasion of the Waikato, the major campaign of the New Zealand Wars. The Battle of Rangiriri, which took place on 20–21 November 1863, cost both sides more than any other engagement of the land wars and also resulted in the capture of 183 Māori prisoners, which impacted on their subsequent ability to oppose the far bigger British force.

== Demographics ==
Rangiriri settlement is in an SA1 statistical area which covers 7.10 km^{2} (2.74 sq mi). The SA1 area is part of the larger Whangamarino statistical area.

Historical population for Rangiriri settlement
| Year | Pop. | ±% p.a. |
|---|---|---|
| 2006 | 126 | — |
| 2013 | 99 | −3.39% |
| 2018 | 111 | +2.31% |
| 2023 | 90 | −4.11% |
The 2006 population is for a larger area of 8.89 km^{2}. Source:

The SA1 area had a population of 90 in the 2023 New Zealand census, a decrease of 21 people (−18.9%) since the 2018 census, and a decrease of 9 people (−9.1%) since the 2013 census. There were 45 males and 45 females in 39 dwellings. 3.3% of people identified as LGBTIQ+. The median age was 42.6 years (compared with 38.1 years nationally). There were 12 people (13.3%) aged under 15 years, 18 (20.0%) aged 15 to 29, 48 (53.3%) aged 30 to 64, and 12 (13.3%) aged 65 or older.

People could identify as more than one ethnicity. The results were 70.0% European (Pākehā); 33.3% Māori; 10.0% Pasifika; 3.3% Asian; and 3.3% Middle Eastern, Latin American and African New Zealanders (MELAA). English was spoken by 96.7%, Māori language by 3.3%, and other languages by 3.3%. The percentage of people born overseas was 16.7, compared with 28.8% nationally.

Religious affiliations were 30.0% Christian, 10.0% Islam, and 3.3% other religions. People who answered that they had no religion were 46.7%, and 6.7% of people did not answer the census question.

Of those at least 15 years old, 9 (11.5%) people had a bachelor's or higher degree, 57 (73.1%) had a post-high school certificate or diploma, and 12 (15.4%) people exclusively held high school qualifications. The median income was $52,600, compared with $41,500 nationally. 6 people (7.7%) earned over $100,000 compared to 12.1% nationally. The employment status of those at least 15 was that 48 (61.5%) people were employed full-time, 9 (11.5%) were part-time, and 3 (3.8%) were unemployed.

=== Whangamarino statistical area ===
Whangamarino statistical area, previously called Rangiriri statistical area, surrounds but does not include Te Kauwhata. It covers 130.51 km^{2} (50.39 sq mi) and had an estimated population of 1,480 as of June 2025, with a population density of 11 people per km^{2}.

Historical population for Rangiriri statistical area
| Year | Pop. | ±% p.a. |
|---|---|---|
| 2006 | 1,029 | — |
| 2013 | 1,464 | +5.17% |
| 2018 | 1,332 | −1.87% |
| 2023 | 1,464 | +1.91% |
Source: footnote=The 2006 population is for a larger area of 137.34 km^{2}.

Whangamarino had a population of 1,464 in the 2023 New Zealand census, an increase of 132 people (9.9%) since the 2018 census, and unchanged since the 2013 census. There were 996 males, 468 females and 3 people of other genders in 360 dwellings. 2.5% of people identified as LGBTIQ+. The median age was 38.3 years (compared with 38.1 years nationally). There were 177 people (12.1%) aged under 15 years, 330 (22.5%) aged 15 to 29, 804 (54.9%) aged 30 to 64, and 156 (10.7%) aged 65 or older.

People could identify as more than one ethnicity. The results were 65.8% European (Pākehā); 37.3% Māori; 6.1% Pasifika; 5.7% Asian; 1.2% Middle Eastern, Latin American and African New Zealanders (MELAA); and 2.5% other, which includes people giving their ethnicity as "New Zealander". English was spoken by 97.3%, Māori language by 12.9%, Samoan by 1.0%, and other languages by 6.6%. No language could be spoken by 1.0% (e.g. too young to talk). New Zealand Sign Language was known by 1.0%. The percentage of people born overseas was 13.9, compared with 28.8% nationally.

Religious affiliations were 26.0% Christian, 0.8% Hindu, 1.6% Islam, 5.9% Māori religious beliefs, 0.2% Buddhist, 0.4% New Age, and 2.5% other religions. People who answered that they had no religion were 57.2%, and 5.3% of people did not answer the census question.

Of those at least 15 years old, 120 (9.3%) people had a bachelor's or higher degree, 741 (57.6%) had a post-high school certificate or diploma, and 429 (33.3%) people exclusively held high school qualifications. The median income was $24,700, compared with $41,500 nationally. 117 people (9.1%) earned over $100,000 compared to 12.1% nationally. The employment status of those at least 15 was that 510 (39.6%) people were employed full-time, 159 (12.4%) were part-time, and 72 (5.6%) were unemployed.

== Features ==
=== Rangiriri Pā ===
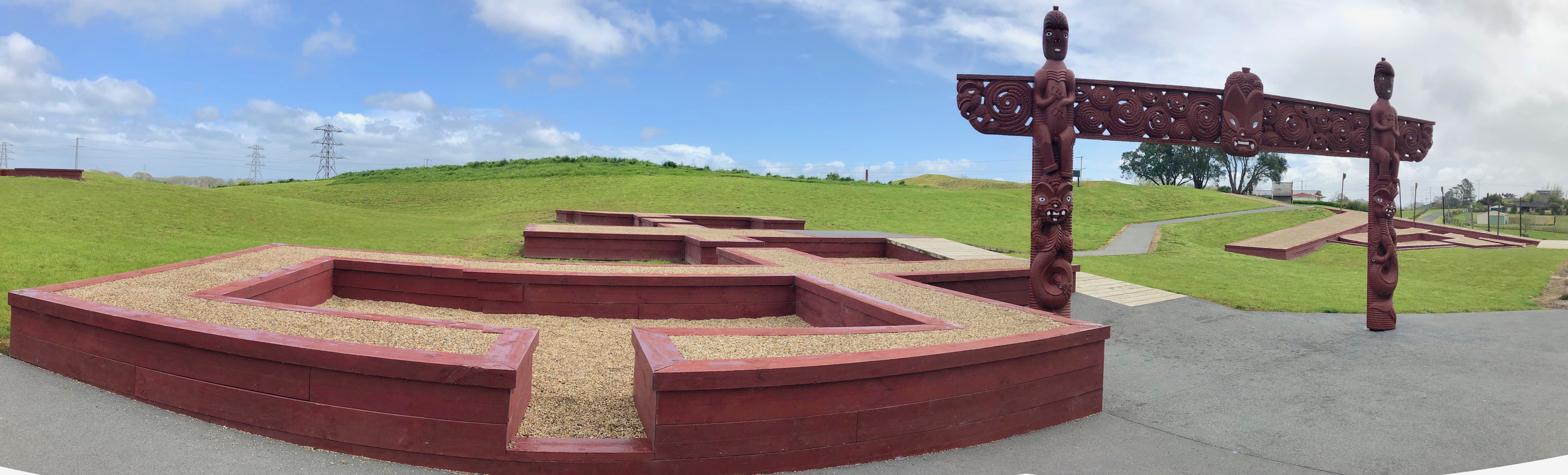
A section of the 2017 symbolic reinterpretation of Rangiriri pā

Rangiriri Pā was a major defence site for Māori during the Invasion of the Waikato, as part of New Zealand Wars. Rangiriri Pā is legally protected as an historic reserve. The pā site was restored as part of work on the Waikato Expressway by the New Zealand Transport Agency; the work was completed for the 150th anniversary of the battle in 2013. The ramparts and trenches of the pā were also restored in subsequent years; Ngāti Naho and elders from other Waikato Tainui marae were welcomed to the site to view the restorations in April 2022.

=== Marae ===
Rangiriri has two marae belonging to the Waikato Tainui hapū of Ngāti Hine, Ngāti Naho, Ngāti Pou and Ngāti Taratikitiki:

- Horahora Marae and Te Whare i Whakaarohia meeting house
- Maurea Marae and Ngā Tumutumu o Rauwhitu meeting house. Both are located on the western side of the Waikato River.

=== Rangiriri Bridge ===
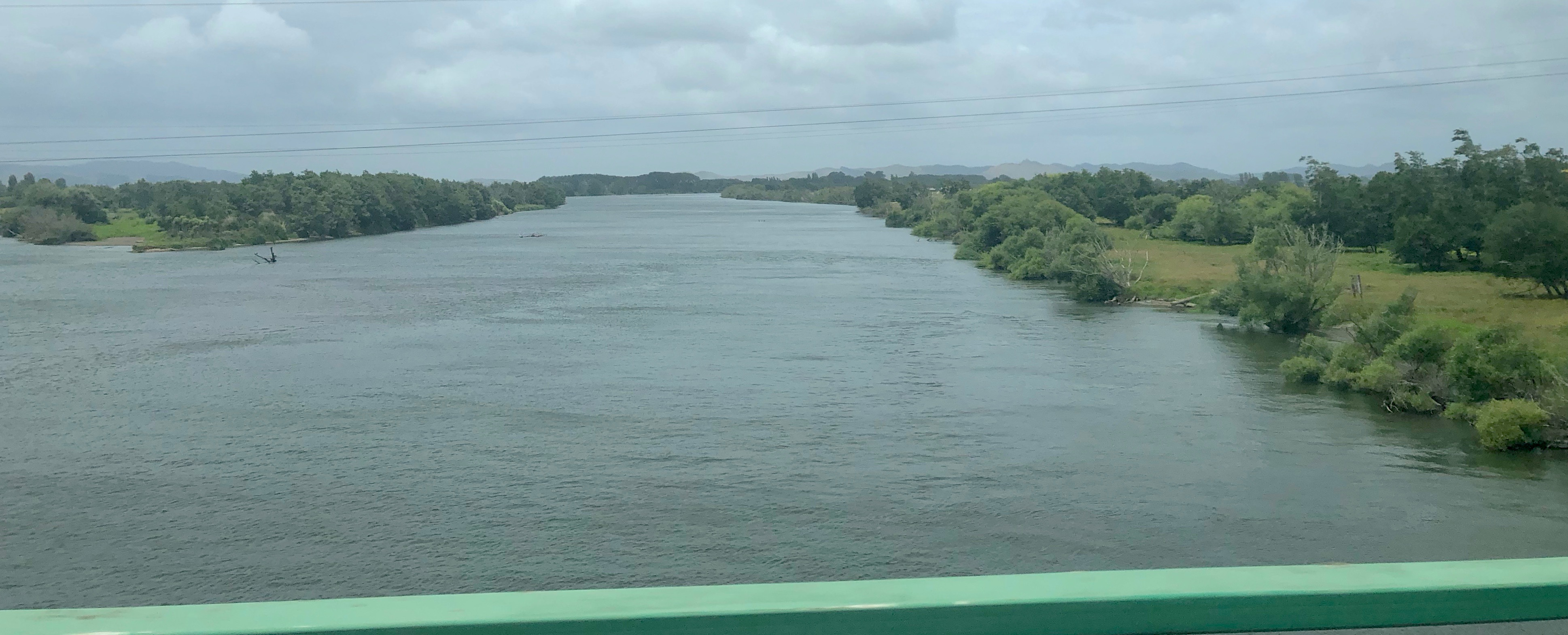
Waikato River looking south east from Rangiriri Bridge.

To replace a punt, which had been operating since at least 1900, a timber truss bridge, with ferro-concrete piles, was started in 1915 and probably opened in 1917. It partly collapsed, but was strengthened to allow light traffic. Demolition of the old bridge cost $30,000.

About 1969 a single-lane replacement, designed by Murray-North Partners, was built downstream for £204,800 (National Roads Board £182,300, Raglan County Council £15,525, Waikato County Council £6975). It is 900 ft (270 m) long, with 8 spans, 6 of 120 ft (37 m). The 2-cell H-section box girder is formed of 3 prestressed, post-tensioned segmented concrete flanged beams. The design was the first in this country to combine precast units into a continuous box girder.

In 2019 it carried about 1,640 vehicles a day on Glen Murray Rd.

== Education ==
Te Kura o Rangiriri is a co-educational state primary school for Year 1 to 8 students, with a roll of 63 as of July 2026. The school has provided Māori language immersion education since 2003, and in 2021 became a designated character school affiliated to Ngā kura-ā-iwi o Aotearoa.
