= Whangamarino railway station =

Railway station in New Zealand

Whangamarino Railway Station
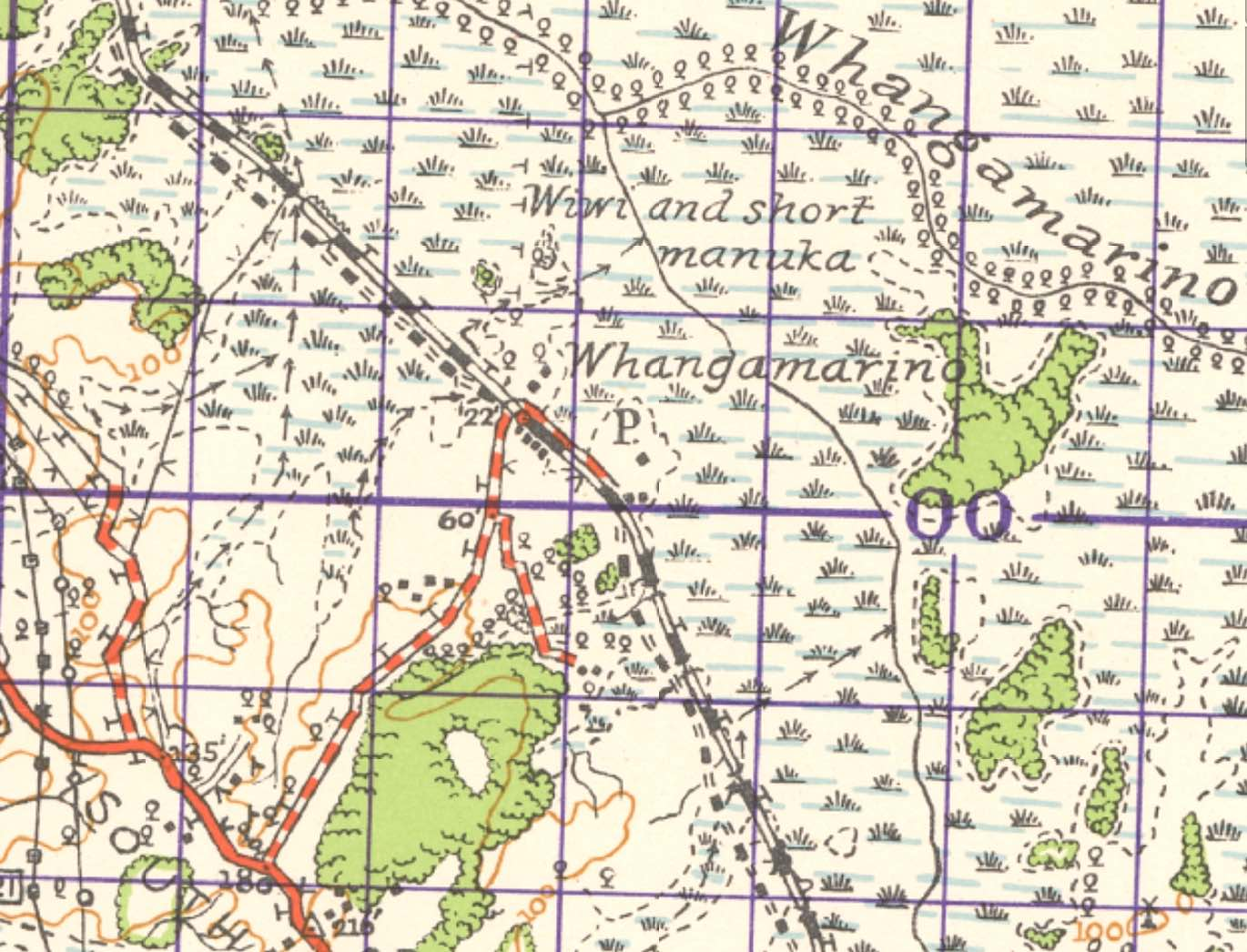
- 1942 Whangamarino railway station on N52 one inch map

General information
- Location: Wattle Road, Whangamarino, New Zealand
- Coordinates: 37.348053°S 175.113916°E
- Owner: KiwiRail Network
- Line: North Island Main Trunk
- Tracks: single

History
- Opened: 13 August 1877
- Closed: 2 February 1969 to passengers 25 June 1978 to goods
Location

Whangamarino was a flag station on the North Island Main Trunk line, in the Waikato District of New Zealand, 49 mi (79 km) south of Auckland. It was 598.24 km (371.73 mi) north of Wellington, 6.19 km (3.85 mi) south of Amokura, 6.72 km (4.18 mi) north of Te Kauwhata and 7 m (23 ft) above sea level.

== History ==
The station opened on 13 August 1877. The early service averaged about 13 mph (21 km/h), taking some 4hrs to Auckland.

Track doubling to ease congestion was authorised in 1914, but work was delayed by the war and the line remains single. A scheme to use spoil from the Auckland City Rail Link to double the track has been considered.

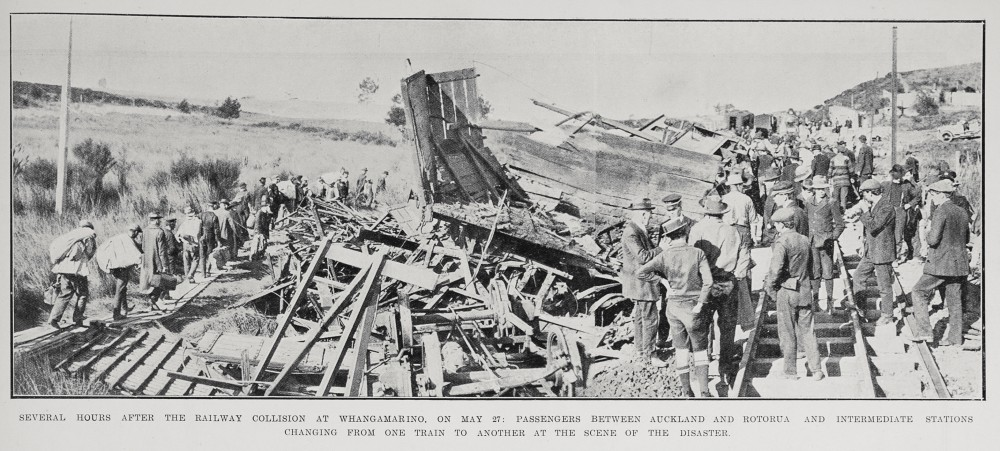
1914 Whangamarino crash

=== Incident ===
Three passengers in a sleeping car died in May 1914, when an express from Wellington passed a broken signal in fog and crashed into a goods train. A porter was charged with manslaughter, but acquitted.

Preceding station	Historical railways	Following station
Amokura; Line open, station closed	North Island Main Trunk; New Zealand Railways Department	Te Kauwhata; Line open, station closed

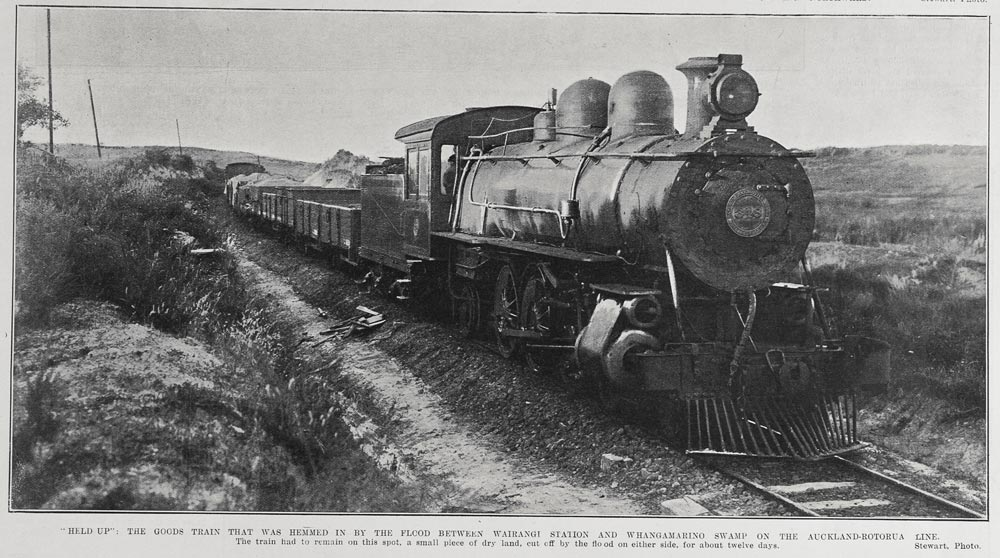
1907 train stranded between Wairangi and Whangamarino by floods
