= Te Kauwhata =

Town in Waikato, New Zealand

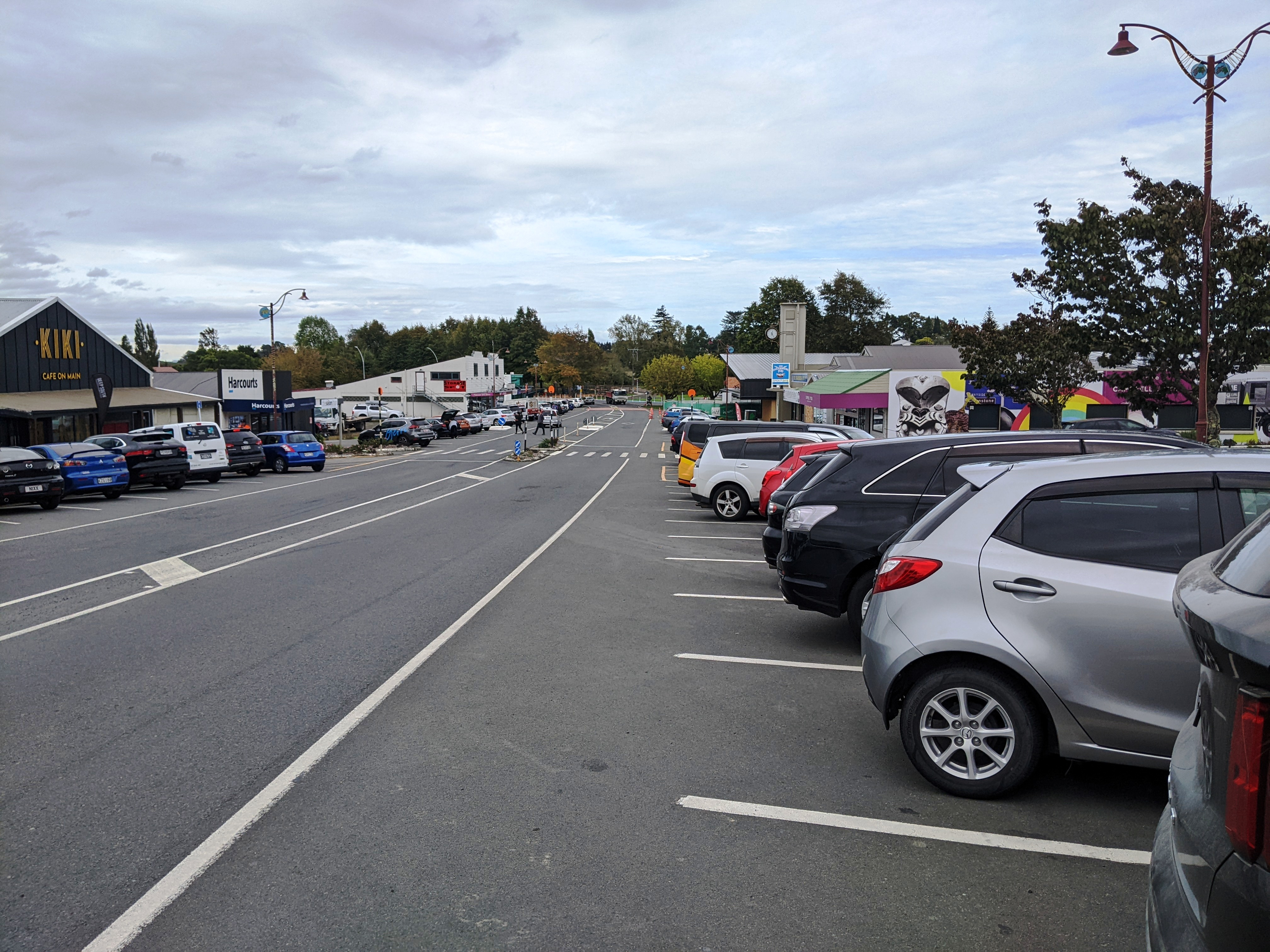
- Interactive map of Te Kauwhata
- Coordinates: 37°24′08″S 175°08′50″E
- Country: New Zealand
- Region: Waikato
- District: Waikato District
- Wards: Waerenga-Whitikahu General Ward; Tai Raro Takiwaa Maaori Ward
- Electorates: Port Waikato; Hauraki-Waikato (Māori)

Government
  - Territorial Authority: Waikato District Council
  - Regional council: Waikato Regional Council
  - Mayor of Waikato: Aksel Bech
  - Port Waikato MP: Matthew Paul
  - Hauraki-Waikato MP: Hana-Rawhiti Maipi-Clarke

Area
  - Total: 8.90 km^{2} (3.44 sq mi)

Population (June 2025)
  - Total: 3,780
  - Density: 425/km^{2} (1,100/sq mi)

Te Kauwhata is a small town in the north of the Waikato region of New Zealand, situated close to the western shore of Lake Waikare, some 40 km north of Hamilton and approximately 58 km south of Manukau City. The township is surrounded by dairy farms, drystock holdings and horticulture. Its newest building is its Waikato District Council library. Originally known as Wairangi, Te Kauwhata grew around a railway station built in the late 1870s.

== Description ==
Te Kauwhata may translate as "the empty storehouse", possibly referring to food storehouses in the original ancient Māori settlement. Te Kauwhata can also translate as "the spiritual medium" or "the frame".

The original name of the research farm and railway station was Wairangi, changed to Waerenga in 1897. Waerenga means a bush clearing for farming. The name Te Kauwhata was used for the settlement from 1910, Te Kauwhata was surveyed for a township in 1912.

Te Kauwhata is the site of a range of farms, including dairy and dry stock, as well as extensive horticulture. Of note is that Te Kauwhata, or "TK" as the locals say, is bordered by the Whangamarino Swamp.

== Demographics ==
Stats NZ describes Te Kauwhata as a small urban area. It covers 8.90 km^{2} (3.44 sq mi) and had an estimated population of 3,780 as of June 2025, with a population density of 425 people per km^{2}.

Historical population
Year	Pop.	±% p.a.
2006	906	—
2013	1,506	+7.53%
2018	2,118	+7.06%
2023	3,303	+9.29%
The 2006 population is for a smaller area of 1.74 km^{2}. Source:

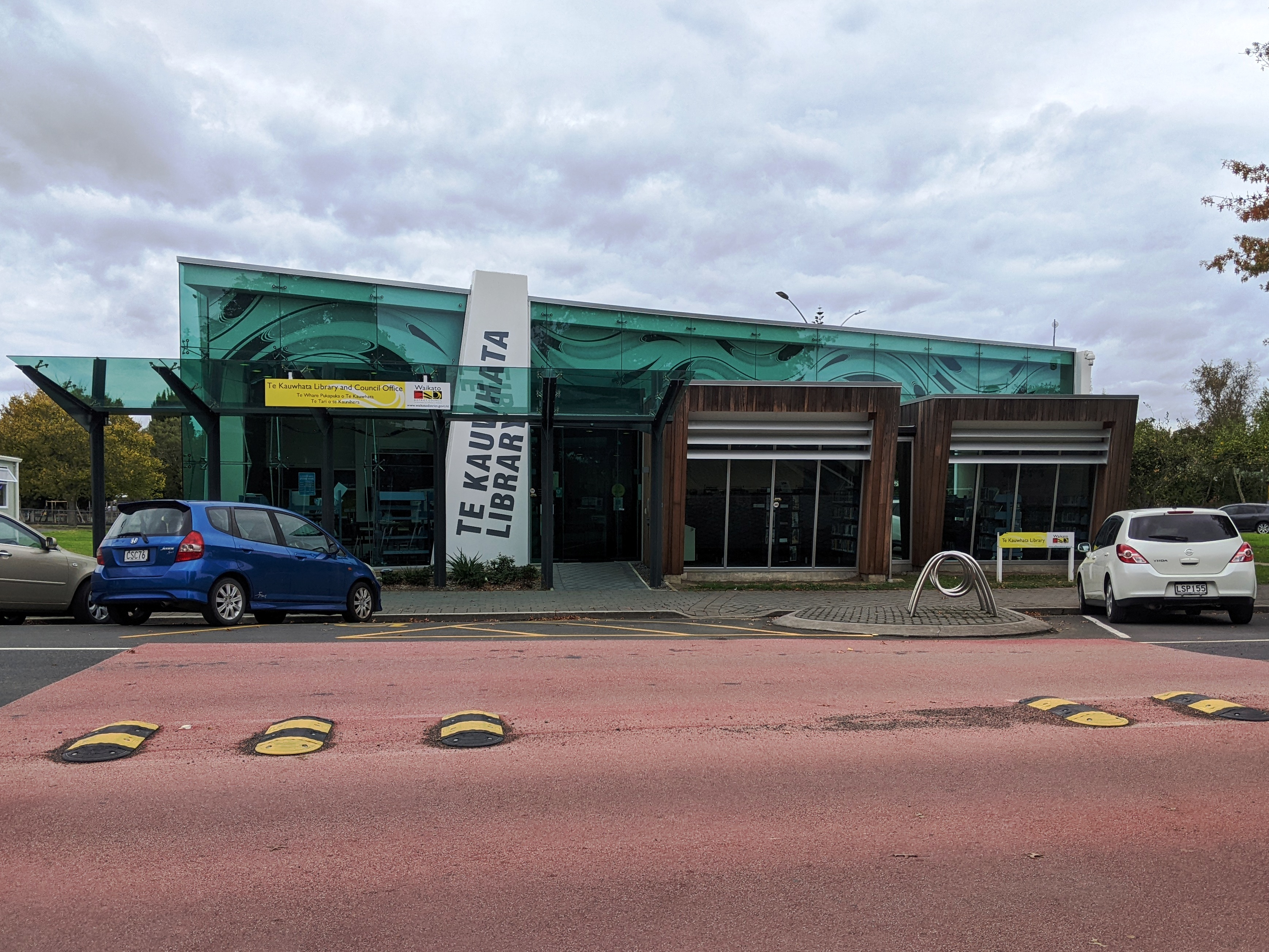
Public library and council building

Te Kauwhata had a population of 3,303 in the 2023 New Zealand census, an increase of 1,185 people (55.9%) since the 2018 census, and an increase of 1,797 people (119.3%) since the 2013 census. There were 1,566 males, 1,725 females and 15 people of other genders in 1,164 dwellings. 2.6% of people identified as LGBTIQ+. The median age was 37.4 years (compared with 38.1 years nationally). There were 747 people (22.6%) aged under 15 years, 513 (15.5%) aged 15 to 29, 1,404 (42.5%) aged 30 to 64, and 642 (19.4%) aged 65 or older.

People could identify as more than one ethnicity. The results were 70.7% European (Pākehā); 25.2% Māori; 8.4% Pasifika; 12.9% Asian; 2.1% Middle Eastern, Latin American and African New Zealanders (MELAA); and 1.8% other, which includes people giving their ethnicity as "New Zealander". English was spoken by 96.0%, Māori language by 4.7%, Samoan by 0.8%, and other languages by 12.8%. No language could be spoken by 2.8% (e.g. too young to talk). New Zealand Sign Language was known by 0.5%. The percentage of people born overseas was 23.4, compared with 28.8% nationally.

Religious affiliations were 29.4% Christian, 2.4% Hindu, 1.4% Islam, 1.3% Māori religious beliefs, 0.7% Buddhist, 0.2% New Age, 0.2% Jewish, and 2.5% other religions. People who answered that they had no religion were 54.3%, and 7.8% of people did not answer the census question.

Of those at least 15 years old, 462 (18.1%) people had a bachelor's or higher degree, 1,380 (54.0%) had a post-high school certificate or diploma, and 720 (28.2%) people exclusively held high school qualifications. The median income was $46,100, compared with $41,500 nationally. 309 people (12.1%) earned over $100,000 compared to 12.1% nationally. The employment status of those at least 15 was that 1,335 (52.2%) people were employed full-time, 258 (10.1%) were part-time, and 57 (2.2%) were unemployed.

Individual statistical areas
Name	Area (km^{2})	Population	Density (per km^{2})	Dwellings	Median age	Median income
Te Kauwhata West	5.82	1,179	203	423	38.6 years	$55,100
Te Kauwhata East	3.08	2,124	690	741	36.7 years	$40,000
New Zealand					38.1 years	$41,500

== Viticulture ==
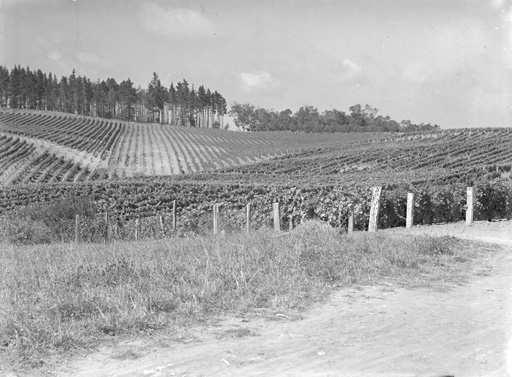
Grapes growing at the Te Kauwhata wine research station, c. 1939

Te Kauwhata lies at the centre of one of New Zealand's smaller wine-producing regions, which stretches from Pukekohe, just south of Auckland, across to Thames and Paeroa at the foot of the Coromandel Peninsula. The region is particularly notable for its Cabernet Sauvignon, Chardonnay and Sauvignon blanc wines.

A government research station was set up in 1886 to explore different crop options. Romeo Bragato took over the running of this station in 1901, with the first wine produced there in 1903. The research station was in private hands, as part of Rongopai wines, and has been subsequently bought out by Babich Wines, but the original buildings are still in use as a cellar door. In February 2016, Invivo Wines, producer of Graham Norton's Own Sauvignon Blanc, announced it had secured a 10-year lease of this winery.

== Marae ==
The local Waikare Marae and Ngāti Hine meeting house is a traditional meeting ground for the Waikato Tainui hapū of Ngāti Hine, Ngāti Naho, Ngāti Pou and Ngāti Taratikitiki.

== Education ==
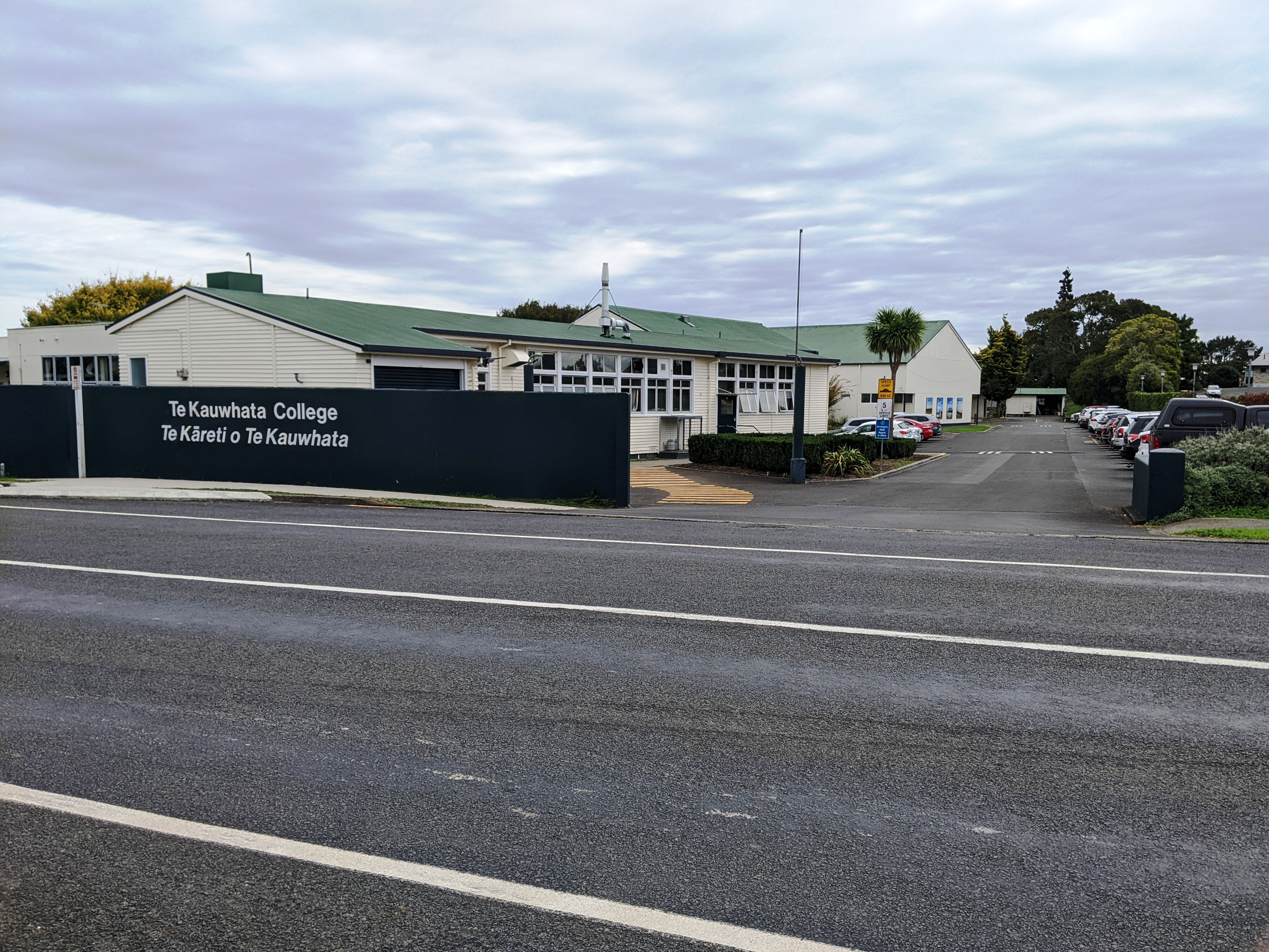
Te Kauwhata College

Te Kauwhata Primary School is a co-educational state primary school for Year 1 to 6 students, with a roll of 385 as of July 2026. The school opened in 1911.

Te Kauwhata College is a co-educational state secondary school for Year 7 to 13 students, with a roll of 504. It opened as Te Kauwhata District High School in 1953, and became Te Kauwhata College in 1970.

The town also has three early childhood education centres.

== Transport ==
Between 1877 and 1995, the Te Kauwhata railway station was served by trains running on the North Island Main Trunk. A new service branded Te Huia and connecting Auckland and Hamilton will commence in August 2020. At a later stage, it will be considered to reactivate the Te Kauwhata railway station.

== Climate ==
Climate data for Te Kauwhata (1981–2010)
Month	Jan	Feb	Mar	Apr	May	Jun	Jul	Aug	Sep	Oct	Nov	Dec	Year
Mean daily maximum °C (°F)	23.9 (75.0)	24.4 (75.9)	22.9 (73.2)	20.0 (68.0)	17.2 (63.0)	14.7 (58.5)	14.1 (57.4)	14.9 (58.8)	16.4 (61.5)	18.0 (64.4)	19.9 (67.8)	22.5 (72.5)	19.1 (66.3)
Daily mean °C (°F)	18.6 (65.5)	19.1 (66.4)	17.5 (63.5)	14.7 (58.5)	12.4 (54.3)	10.1 (50.2)	9.4 (48.9)	10.4 (50.7)	12.0 (53.6)	13.4 (56.1)	15.1 (59.2)	17.3 (63.1)	14.2 (57.5)
Mean daily minimum °C (°F)	13.4 (56.1)	13.8 (56.8)	12.1 (53.8)	9.5 (49.1)	7.6 (45.7)	5.4 (41.7)	4.6 (40.3)	5.9 (42.6)	7.5 (45.5)	8.8 (47.8)	10.3 (50.5)	12.2 (54.0)	9.3 (48.7)
Average rainfall mm (inches)	82.2 (3.24)	66.4 (2.61)	85.4 (3.36)	86.5 (3.41)	107.6 (4.24)	110.3 (4.34)	106.0 (4.17)	100.2 (3.94)	99.5 (3.92)	87.9 (3.46)	74.9 (2.95)	101.9 (4.01)	1,108.8 (43.65)
Mean monthly sunshine hours	220.7	176.6	161.7	157.5	131.6	91.0	127.8	125.2	136.8	168.0	169.3	197.4	1,863.6
Source: NIWA (rain 1971–2000)
