= Te Kauwhata railway station =

Railway station in New Zealand

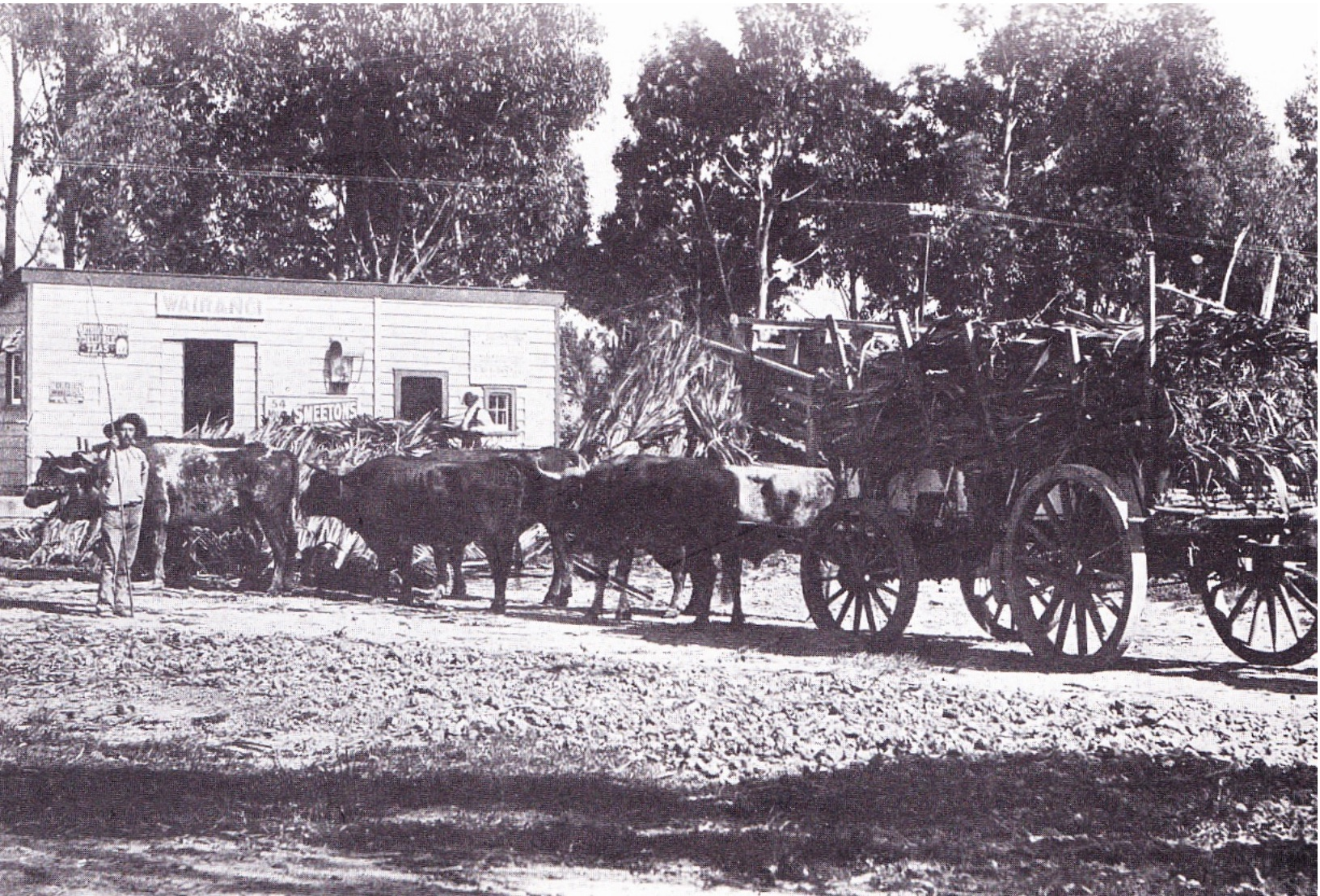
- Wairangi Railway Station about 1900

General information
- Location: Saleyard Road, Te Kauwhata, New Zealand
- Coordinates: 37.40504°S 175.141897°E
- Elevation: 12 m (39 ft)
- Line: North Island Main Trunk
- Distance: Wellington 591.52 km (367.55 mi)

History
- Opened: 13 August 1877
- Closed: 24 November 1985
- Former names: Wairangi to Waerenga in 1897; Waerenga to 28 May 1911

Passengers
- 1944: 16,112

Services
Preceding station	Historical railways	Following station
Whangamarino; Line open, station closed 6.19 km (3.85 mi)	North Island Main Trunk; KiwiRail	Rangiriri; Line open, station closed 6.19 km (3.85 mi)
Location
- Location within New Zealand

Te Kauwhata was a flag station on the North Island Main Trunk line, in the Waikato District of New Zealand, 54 mi (87 km) south of Auckland. It was 591.52 km (367.55 mi) north of Wellington, 3.32 km (2.06 mi) north of Rangiriri, 6.72 km (4.18 mi) south of Whangamarino and 12 m (39 ft) above sea level.

The name was changed from Wairangi to Waerenga in 1897 and to Te Kauwhata on 28 May 1911. Initially the station served a state experimental farm, but, from 1912, Te Kauwhata township was created.

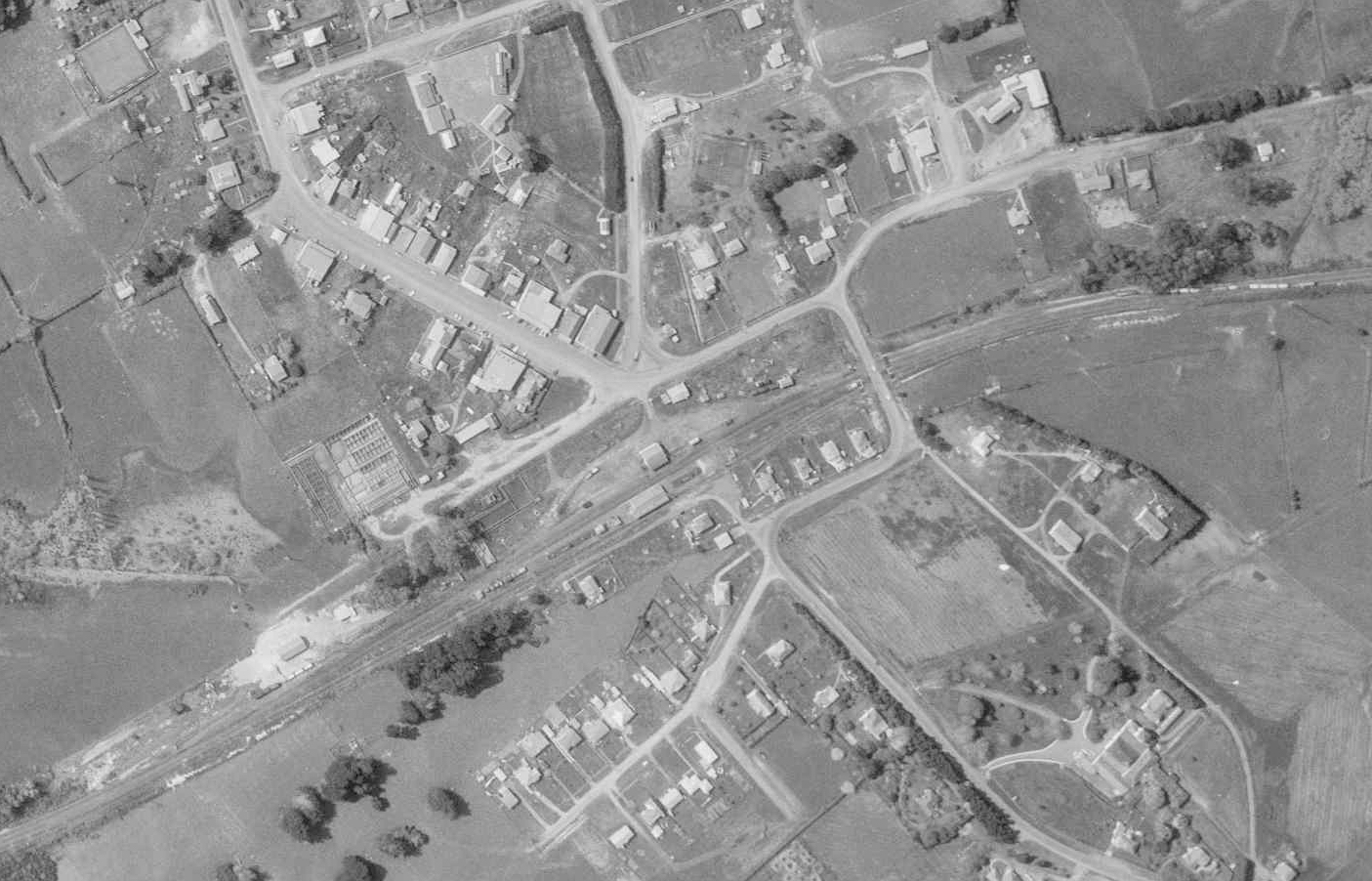
1963 aerial photo of Te Kauwhata

== History ==
The station opened on 13 August 1877. The early service averaged about 13 mph (21 km/h), taking about 4hr 15 mins to Auckland.

The original station had a platform, shelter and a siding for 61 wagons. Station buildings were added in 1879, a cattle yard and loading platform in 1886, a goods shed from Otorohanga in 1894 and the old Pukekohe station in 1913, as a ladies’ waiting room. A goods shed was built in 1924 and a new station by 1925. There was a station master in 1932.

Track doubling to ease congestion had been authorised in 1914, but work was delayed by the war. Doubling from Ohinewai to Te Kauwhata didn't open until 14 December 1958 and the line to the north remains single, though doubling is being investigated in a business case from July 2021.

Unlocked points caused an express to derail in 1911. Three goods trains crashed at the station in 1930. A shunter was killed in 1931.

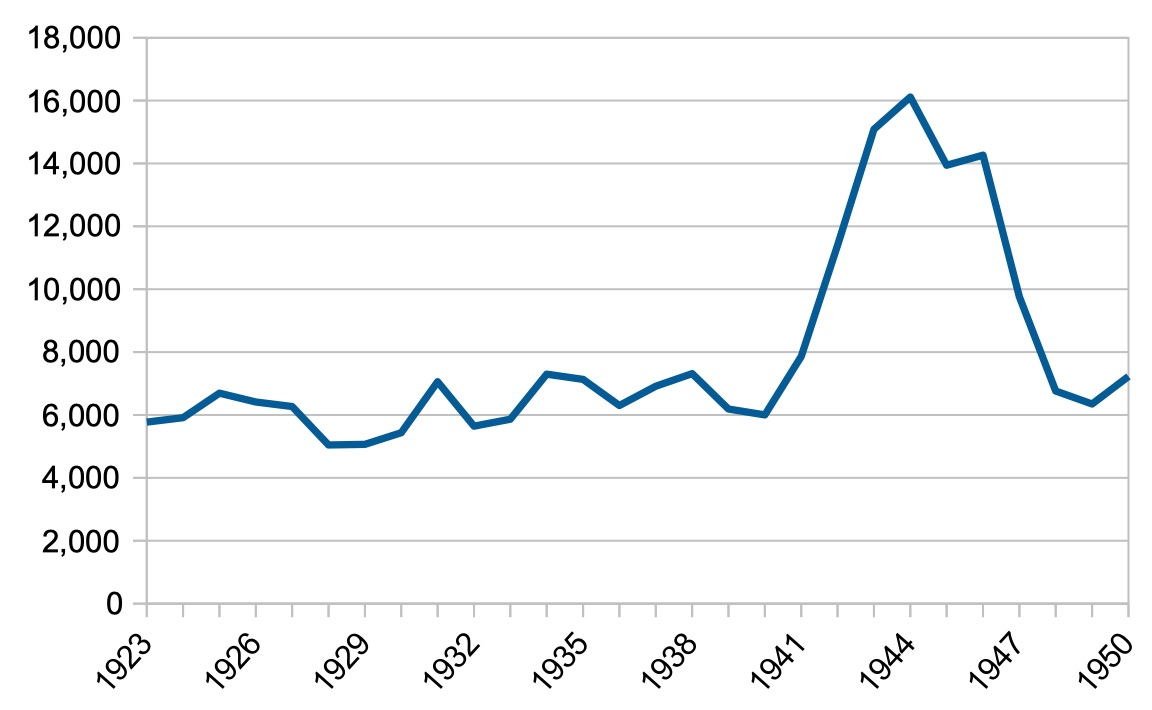
Te Kauwhata railway station passenger use 1923-1950

Passenger numbers peaked in 1944, as shown in the graph and table below -

year	tickets	season tickets	source	title
1923	5,773	47	https://paperspast.natlib.govt.nz/parliamentary/appendix-to-the-journals-of-the-house-of-representatives/1923/I-II/1321	RETURN No. 12. Statement of Revenue for each Station for the Year ended 31 March 1923
1924	5,914	24	https://paperspast.natlib.govt.nz/parliamentary/appendix-to-the-journals-of-the-house-of-representatives/1924/I/2458	RETURN No. 12. Statement of Revenue for each Station for the Year ended 31 March 1924
1925	6,694	66	https://paperspast.natlib.govt.nz/parliamentary/appendix-to-the-journals-of-the-house-of-representatives/1925/I/1804	RETURN No. 12. Statement of Traffic and Revenue for each Station for the Year ended 31 March 1925
1926	6,412	38	https://paperspast.natlib.govt.nz/parliamentary/appendix-to-the-journals-of-the-house-of-representatives/1926/I/1930	STATEMENT No. 18 Statement of Traffic and Revenue for each Station for the Year ended 31 March 1926
1927	6,269	40	https://paperspast.natlib.govt.nz/parliamentary/appendix-to-the-journals-of-the-house-of-representatives/1927/I/2230	STATEMENT No. 18 Statement of Traffic and Revenue for each Station for the Year ended 31 March 1927
1928	5,046	34	https://paperspast.natlib.govt.nz/parliamentary/appendix-to-the-journals-of-the-house-of-representatives/1928/I/2628	STATEMENT No. 18 Statement of Traffic and Revenue for each Station for the Year ended 31 March 1928
1929	5,064	26	https://paperspast.natlib.govt.nz/parliamentary/appendix-to-the-journals-of-the-house-of-representatives/1929/I/2090	STATEMENT No. 18 Statement of Traffic and Revenue for each Station for the Year ended 31 March 1929
1930	5,436	30	https://paperspast.natlib.govt.nz/parliamentary/appendix-to-the-journals-of-the-house-of-representatives/1930/I/2212	STATEMENT No. 18 Statement of Traffic and Revenue for each Station for the Year ended 31 March 1930
1931	7,056	13	https://paperspast.natlib.govt.nz/parliamentary/appendix-to-the-journals-of-the-house-of-representatives/1931/I-II/1778	STATEMENT No. 18 Statement of Traffic and Revenue for each Station for the Year ended 31 March 1931
1932	5,645	9	https://paperspast.natlib.govt.nz/parliamentary/appendix-to-the-journals-of-the-house-of-representatives/1932/I-II/1934	STATEMENT No. 18 Statement of Traffic and Revenue for each Station for the Year ended 31 March 1932
1933	5,866	10	https://paperspast.natlib.govt.nz/parliamentary/appendix-to-the-journals-of-the-house-of-representatives/1933/I/1388	STATEMENT No. 18 Statement of Traffic and Revenue for each Station for the Year ended 31 March 1933
1934	7,298	11	https://paperspast.natlib.govt.nz/parliamentary/appendix-to-the-journals-of-the-house-of-representatives/1934/I/2278	STATEMENT No. 18 Statement of Traffic and Revenue for each Station for the Year ended 31 March 1934
1935	7,131	12	https://paperspast.natlib.govt.nz/parliamentary/appendix-to-the-journals-of-the-house-of-representatives/1935/I/1326	STATEMENT No. 18 Statement of Traffic and Revenue for each Station for the Year ended 31 March 1935
1936	6,299	23	https://paperspast.natlib.govt.nz/parliamentary/appendix-to-the-journals-of-the-house-of-representatives/1936/I/1552	STATEMENT No. 18 Statement of Traffic and Revenue for each Station for the Year ended 31 March 1936
1937	6,915	27	https://paperspast.natlib.govt.nz/parliamentary/appendix-to-the-journals-of-the-house-of-representatives/1937/I/1896	STATEMENT No. 18 Statement of Traffic and Revenue for each Station for the Year ended 31 March 1937
1938	7,316	25	https://paperspast.natlib.govt.nz/parliamentary/appendix-to-the-journals-of-the-house-of-representatives/1938/I/1652	STATEMENT No. 18 Statement of Traffic and Revenue for each Station for the Year ended 31 March 1938
1939	6,190	61	https://paperspast.natlib.govt.nz/parliamentary/appendix-to-the-journals-of-the-house-of-representatives/1939/I/1970	STATEMENT No. 18 Statement of Traffic and Revenue for each Station for the Year ended 31 March 1939
1940	6,001	45	https://paperspast.natlib.govt.nz/parliamentary/appendix-to-the-journals-of-the-house-of-representatives/1940/I/1314	STATEMENT No. 18 Statement of Traffic and Revenue for each Station for the Year ended 31 March 1940
1941	7,862	68	https://paperspast.natlib.govt.nz/parliamentary/appendix-to-the-journals-of-the-house-of-representatives/1941/I/1203	STATEMENT No. 18 Statement of Traffic and Revenue for each Station for the Year ended 31 March 1941
1942	11,396	53	https://paperspast.natlib.govt.nz/parliamentary/appendix-to-the-journals-of-the-house-of-representatives/1942/I/651	STATEMENT No. 18 Statement of Traffic and Revenue for each Station for the Year ended 31 March 1942
1943	15,087	61	https://paperspast.natlib.govt.nz/parliamentary/appendix-to-the-journals-of-the-house-of-representatives/1943/I/679	STATEMENT No. 18 Statement of Traffic and Revenue for each Station for the Year ended 31 March 1943
1944	16,112	58	https://paperspast.natlib.govt.nz/parliamentary/appendix-to-the-journals-of-the-house-of-representatives/1944/I/895	STATEMENT No. 18 Statement of Traffic and Revenue for each Station for the Year ended 31 March 1944
1945	13,944	34	https://paperspast.natlib.govt.nz/parliamentary/appendix-to-the-journals-of-the-house-of-representatives/1945/I/969	STATEMENT No. 18 Statement of Traffic and Revenue for each Station for the Year ended 31 March 1945
1946	14,264	20	https://paperspast.natlib.govt.nz/parliamentary/appendix-to-the-journals-of-the-house-of-representatives/1946/I/1548	STATEMENT No. 18 Statement of Traffic and Revenue for each Station for the Year ended 31 March 1946
1947	9,758	17	https://paperspast.natlib.govt.nz/parliamentary/appendix-to-the-journals-of-the-house-of-representatives/1947/I/2495	STATEMENT No. 18 Statement of Traffic and Revenue for each Station for the Year ended 31 March 1947
1948	6,762	2	https://paperspast.natlib.govt.nz/parliamentary/appendix-to-the-journals-of-the-house-of-representatives/1948/I/2521	STATEMENT No. 18 Statement of Traffic and Revenue for each Station for the Year ended 31 March 1948
1949	6,348	1	https://paperspast.natlib.govt.nz/parliamentary/appendix-to-the-journals-of-the-house-of-representatives/1949/I/2104	STATEMENT No. 18 Statement of Traffic and Revenue for each Station for the Year ended 31 March 1949
1950	7,226	3	https://paperspast.natlib.govt.nz/parliamentary/appendix-to-the-journals-of-the-house-of-representatives/1950/I/2366	STATEMENT No. 18 Statement of Traffic and Revenue for each Station for the Year ended 31 March 1950

== Reopening ==
A 2018 report to Waikato Regional Council suggested reopening in 2023, as the station has 3 tracks and "Te Kauwhata was considered to be the easiest of these stations to reactivate", the main work being raising the platform. The initial Te Huia train, to commence in August 2020, will not stop at Te Kauwhata. In 2020 reopening of the platform was put forward as part of a scheme to help the region recover from the economic impact of the COVID-19 pandemic, at an estimated cost of $10m.
