= Ngāti Te Wehi =

- Iwi (tribe) in Māoridom
- Rohe (region): Aotea Harbour
- Waka (canoe): Tainui
- Population: 10,000

Ngāti Te Wehi is a Māori iwi (tribe) based in Kawhia on the west coast of New Zealand's North Island.

According to the 1874 census, Ngati Te Wehi were registered as an iwi. They are the principal iwi of the Aotea Harbour iwi, with close ties and connections with Ngati Reko, Ngati Mahuta, Ngati Whawhakia], Ngati Patupo, Ngati Te Uru and Ngati Mahanga. Ngāti Te Wehi also have historical connections with Ngāti Hauā, Ngati Whatua, Ngati Koata, Ngati Toa Rangatira, Ngati Mutunga, Ngati Ruanui, Ngati Tahinga, Ngati Paipai, Ngati Paiaka, Ngati Rangitauwwaro, Ngati Whare, Ngati Koura, Ngati Hourua, Te Wehiwhakaruru and Ngati Peehi. The Aotea Moana iwi all consider Mt Karioi and her Husband Kārewa / Gannet Island to be sacred. Ngāti Te Wehi have tribal holdings in Te Taitokerau, Ngati Maniapoto and Aotea.

== History ==
Te Wehi is the founding ancestor of the Ngāti Te Wehi iwi. Achieving this by recapturing a sacred dog skin war cloak, or Kahu Kuri (dog-skin korowai were the most prestigious of Māori cloaks), and also a mere pounamu (jade club), items that no other local chief could obtain. But he was able to by the mana (prestige) of his father Pakaue, who was killed for them anyway by Tautini-moko (the son of Tuahu-māhina, the local Kāwhia Chief) who was jealous as he was refused the High Chiefly and sacred items.

Te Wehi's (or Te Wehi Te Kihi) parents are father Pakaue & mother Koata of Ngāti Koata, Pakaue is of Ngāti Tū-irirangi/Ngāti Wairere. There are a few versions to the whakapapa of who were the parents of Pakaue according to Ngāti Te Wehi Kāumatua and Kūia during the Waitangi hearings held at Ngāruawāhia. In 1908-09, both Kauki Tauira of Ngaati Te Wehi and Te Kamanomano of Ngāti Reko state the whakapapa of Pakaue and reference to Tuhorotini a son of Tūirirangi and Koura Tuwhea of Ngāti Wairere to be Pakaue's parents. Te Wehi's mum Koata according to Tainui is of the Ngāti Mahanga, Ngāti Mahuta & Ngāti Mango people.

According to research Te Wehi is said to have been a very swift runner and a fierce warrior, so too his older half brother Kawharu the Giant was 9 ft tall , both living prosperous but then separate lives after a small brotherly scuffle at Kāwhia, in which Kawharu went to live with his father Ngaere and his people the Ngāti Tamainupo at Wai-keria.

Te Wehi Te Kihi was born in Kawhia at a pā site known as Karere-atua and spent his young adolescence in Kāwhia, after their little scuffle older brother Kawharu left Kawhia but eventually came back after helping in battles against Te Arawa with Ngāti Raukawa chief Ngatokowaru.

Te Wehi moved to the Aotea Harbour after Pakaue his father was murdered for items only he could obtain, a Dogskin Korowai cloak named Pīpītewai & a sacred war club named Karioi-mutu was given to Pakaue by an inland chief named Te Rau who lived over the ranges in the Waipa Valley. Te Rau had completed this kahu kuri (dogskin) cloak and it was coveted by many local Chiefs. Pakaue's cousin Tūahu-māhina a son of Tū-irirangi & chief of the Ngāti Ariari tribe, lived at Motu-ngaio pa not far from Karere-atua, His failed attempt to obtain these coveted items & remarks from the Maniapoto chief Te Kanawa “O Tūahu-māhina, your prestige has been lowered by your younger relative Pakaue, because he has been able to obtain that which has been denied to you.” The thought of this made Tūahu-māhina very angry.

Te Kanawa went on to Kawhia to see Pakaue and his warrior sons and started an argument with Kawharu, which incensed Te Kanawa enough to complain to Tūahu-māhina who attacked with the Ngāti Ariari, Pakaue & his family escaping but Pakaue taking a different route was found by Tautini-moko son of Tuahu-māhina and killed elderly Pakaue for the cloak & sacred war patu.

Now Toa-Rangatira(Ngāti Mango) is an uncle to Te Wehi as he married Pakaue's sister Mananaki. Half brother Kawharu married Toa-Rangatira's daughter Waikauri, the tupuna of Te Rauparaha.

Giant Kawharu not satisfied with his one revenge upon Tūahu-māhina's warriors, decided to enlist the help of his father-in-law Toa-Rangatira, whose first joint battle with Kawharu beat Te Kanawa after he attacked them, but Toa-Rangatira let Te Kanawa go, to spread their fame as great warriors, the pair with their tribes then won a battle against Tūahu-māhina at Te Maika, the latter running to the safety of his Motu-ngaio Pa but then surrounded was ambushed & killed by Toa-Rangatira as he then tried to escaped Motu-ngaio, the names of the battles fought have been handed down to us. They were Te Moana-waipu, Pohoetangehe, and Te Keukeukeua.

After these battles about 1675, Kawharu & Toa-Rangatira from Marokopa had Kawhia district in their undisputed possession. Older brother Kawharu now satisfied with the revenge he had obtained, desired to make peace with the survivors. Te Wehi would not agree, & Kawharu, not wishing to be further involved, collected his people & moved to the shores of Aotea harbour & occupied Raorao-kauere & Manuaiti Pa, while Te Wehi went to live at Matakowhai and the Ngāti Toa-Rangatira retained Motu Ngaio Pa until the 1820s before migrating south with Te Rauparaha & Ngāti Koata.

News of the death of Tūahu-māhina spread & reached the ears of Tautini-moko, who had fled to Whanganui, and hearing that peace had been made, he returned with the sacred Patu & dogskin Korowai cloak & occupied the pa Te Rau-o-te-huia, not far distant from Raorao-kauere. When Tautini-moko returned, Te Wehi was living at Te Maari Aotea Harbour, & when the news reached him that his father's slayer was across the harbour, he decided to kill him. When he announced his intentions however, he received no support, it being contended that peace had been made; but Te Wehi was not to be cheated of his revenge, & set out to Waikato to obtain assistant from that tribe.

According to ancestor's, Ngāti Te Wehi became an iwi after he had regained his father's Mana and made connections to his granduncles Wharetiipeti and Tapaue of Ngaati Mahuta. Mahuta begat Uerata who married Puakirangi, Koata's Auntie. Uerata & Puakirangi had Rangihoto, Wharetiipeti, Hourua & Tapaue.

After the support from Wharetiipeti & Tapaue to attack Te Rau-o-te-huia pa, Te Wehi, a very fast runner, chased down his father's assailant off the Aotea harbour peninsula killing him and sercuring Karioi Mutu & Pīpī Te Wai. Te Wehi gave the Scared Patu & Korowai to the Ngāti Mahuta Chiefs as they had their hand out for them, he also gave his daughter Reko to marry Tapaue's son Tahau. The then named Tokoreko & her husband Tahau became the Great Grand Parents of Whakaawi, mother of King Tawhiao. Decades later the korowai cloak & Mere were secured in a round-a-bout way by the rightful owners and placed in Ruakuri, one of three famous caves at Waitomo, but when this cave became known to Europeans they were both removed by Te Moerua Natanahira and placed in a vault at Te Kotahitanga, Otorohanga.

Ngati Whatua had heard of Kawharu's bravery and strength in battle, and in 1680, asked him north to Kaipara to help fight Te Kawerau. He led a series of raids — known as Te Raupatu Tihore, "The Stripping Conquest" — across the Tamaki isthmus, before being killed at a pa at Waiherunga in South Kaipara.

Te Wehi had many small pa sites located around Aotea but his most beautiful was at the peak tops of Matakowhai. Upon his death, his people, known as "Ngāti Te Wehi", moved South West of Aotea Harbour, some stayed at Makomako, Te Papatapu and Motakotako.

Te Wehi has been known to have had 3 wives, but his principle wife was Mariu who bore Te Hauwhangairua, Te Paipai, Tokoreko, Paiaka, Te Whakamaui, Hineketu and Te Rangitauwawaro. Each of these Children lived at Mowhiti (Pākoka), Te Papatapu, Te Maari, Makomako, Te Urewera, Waiteika, Kaiariki, Paataka, Patumarama, Ruakotare, Wairoa, Maungaroa and so too did their descendants. Later most of the descendants headed to Waitetuna district as part of the conquested lands claimed by Te Wehi with the overthrow of the giant tyrant Toa-angiangi, these lands that the fastest runner in Aotearoa claimed were from Pukekohe to Otorohanga and the West Coast, so these Children of Te Wehi and Mariu are of importance as they are founders of many iwi and hapu today.

This brings us to Rangitaupopoki the son of Waenganui II who is the son of Paiaka & Rangihora, Rangihora being the daughter of the giant Ngaati Koura warloard Hotumauea & Paiaka being the son of the great Te Wehi & his princess wife Mariu, daughter of Hape & Te Angaangawaero who is the daughter of the great chief Wahiao of Te Arawa descendant of Tuhourangi-Ngāti Wahiao, Tuhourangi was 9 ft tall.

Rangitaupopoki married two Ngāti Maniapoto descendants named Parehikitanga & Waimahanga who were sisters. Parehikitanga & husband had three children, Te Urumahue a daughter, Tūtemahurangi & Te Moke. Tūtemahurangi begat three known sons, and he married Metiria Waikato a Daughter to Te Riria Whareherehere, one of his sons was Pita Waikato later known as Pita Mahu Waikato of Ngāti Te Wehi. Pita Mahu married Tirimata Karuwhero a Chieftess who occupied Maukutea before her marriage to him. Tirimata was given the Chieftess title after the death of her father Mohi Karuwhero a great grandchild of Tahuariki and Tokoreko. One of Pita and Tirimata sons was Te Mahara Pita Mahu who was very active in claimant for Ngati Te Wehi. The other known sons of Tūtemahurangi were Matiu and Te Aotūroa a.k.a. Hōne Waitere, sons born to Marutehiakina II. Matiu was taken as hostage in 1822, in which after Nga Puhi took him back to Whangarei and he was raised my a Chief there as his own son.

Te Wehi's great grandson Rangitaupopoki of Ngati Paiaka/Ngapuhi and his Ngāti Maniapoto princess had 2 warrior sons, Te Moke and a Tutemahurangi, whose sons Pita Mahu Waikato and Te Aotūroa Hōne Waitere who were in their 20s at the time, would have helped their dad and uncle Te Moke with the battles against Te Rauparaha as he killed Te Uira and a battle to fight for a Ngāti Te Wehi chief Te Aomārama at Makomako, Aotea harbour. Soon after with the Ngāti Mahanga & Ngāti Maniapoto Te Moke rounded up 5000 with Pōtatau Te Wherowhero of Ngāti Mahuta plus the Ngāti Hourua and together the Ngāti Koata(Aotea) and Ngāti Toa of Kawhia harbour were cleared out and everlasting peace ensued and all the tangata whenua(people of the land) worked their lands and sold their produce to Auckland pakeha until 1863 when the government wanted the fertile Waikato Basin for themselves so the battles against the British army started.

After the 1821 warfare Ngāti Mahanga/Ngāti Te Wehi chief Te Aoturoa Hone Waitere and his Ngāti Mahanga/Koura princess Pirihiri moved to Te Waihi on the Aotea peninsular when in 1822 his younger brother was taken by Nga Puhi. Hōne Waitere is then remembered living at Te Pahi where their children were born in the late 1830s and 1842, they all lived in peace at their dads residences and his burial place Te Pahi, Aotea Harbour.

Te Aotūroa took the name Te Aotūroa Hōne Waitere when the Wesleyan Mission was set up in area mid 1830s by John Whiteley. John convinced Te Aoturoa in 1840 to sign the Treaty of Waitangi but could not convince Te Wherowhero. Te Aotūroa Hōne Waitere sold land at Te Kopua in the Waipa for the Wesleyan's to teach their people to read and grow new food from countries afar. Shortly after signing the Treaty of Waitangi he got his uncle Te Moke to sell land at Raoraokaurere to the Wesleyan's so they had their own mission station and using old planting grounds at Raoraokauere were growing wheat and barley so Ngāti Te Wehi had the first water powered water mills in the area.

Te Aotūroa Hōne Waitere was a Ngāti Te Wehi/Ngāti Mahanga chief who signed the Manukau-Kawhia copy of the Treaty of Waitangi 15 June 1840. This Manukau-Kawhia Maori-language copy of the Treaty of Waitangi, with 13 signatures, & is the only surviving copy with the signature of Colonial Secretary Willoughby Shortland. It was also the last copy to be returned, in 1841.

Shortland sent it to Captain William Symonds on 13 March 1840 to gather signatures from chiefs around and to the south of the Manukau Harbour. Symonds was working in the area on behalf of a proposed Scottish land company settlement. He and James Hamlin of the Church Missionary Society assembled several chiefs, probably at Awhitu, but failed to get their agreement. Many Waikato chiefs, including Te Wherowhero, attended a second meeting on 20 March. Three Ngāti Whatua chiefs signed then (Kawau, Tinana and Reweti) but none of the Waikato chiefs. Wesleyan missionaries James Wallis and John Whiteley(Hone Waitere to Kawhia Maori) gathered 10 more signatures at Kawhia between April and September 1840. Each name has the prefix 'Ko', which is not part of the name and has 'his mark' following the moko or mark. Signed Treaty on 15 June 1840, witnessed by John Whiteley.

Born in Aotea Harbor approx.1799 Te Aotūroa(a.k.a. Hōne Waitere) before signing the Treaty of Waitangi was also signatory to 35 acres of land sold at £4 for the Wesleyan mission at Te Kopua on 5 May 1840, & Sold 10,000 aces with other chiefs to the crown on 2nd Dec 1857 called Te Wharauroa Block, £410 was paid by John Rogan on behalf of Queen Victoria over 4 years. The last of land transactions with the crown before the Waikato Wars until 1911 when 17,000 acres of Moerangi Block was sold to the government.

=== Aotea Wesleyan Mission School and farm ===
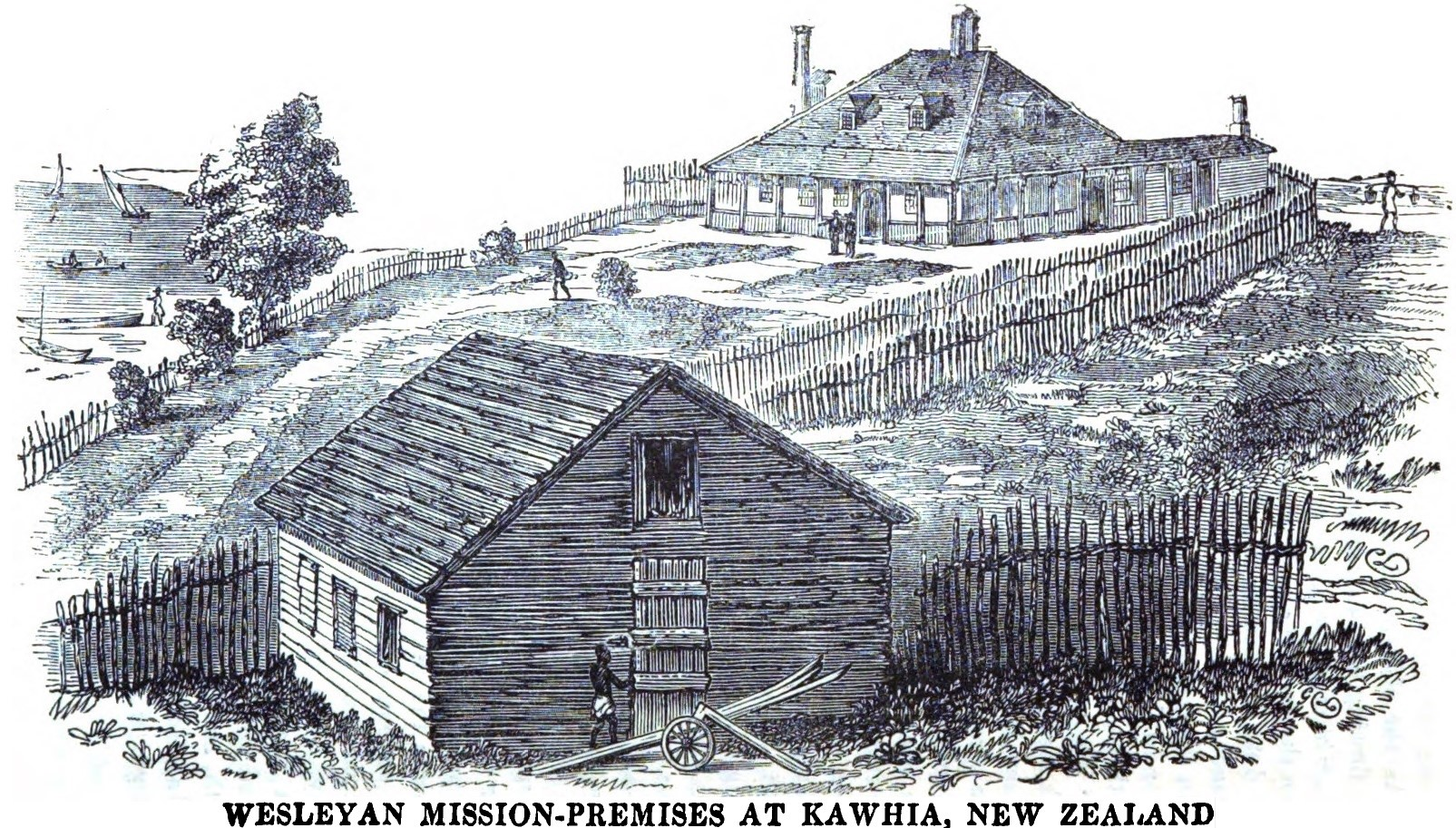
Wesleyan Mission-Premises at Kawhia

By 1840 here were now 3 Wesleyan Missions in the area, Waiharakeke the site of the first Wesleyan Mission Station established by John Whiteley in April 1835.(Te Waitere) Kawhia, Raglan 1839 and now Te Kopua 1840 but not one with the Ngāti Te Wehi at Aotea Harbor. So at around the time of signing the Treaty Kawhia Hōne Waitere Te Aotūroa Rangatira of Ngāti Te Wehi, Hapu Ngāti Paiaka of Aotea Harbor lovingly persuaded Rev. John Bumby the Superintendent of the Wesleyan Church to set up a mission in Aotea Harbour, site of the landing of the Aotea Canoe and of an ancient Pa. On the northern side 844 acres were gifted to the Wesleyans for a boys’ school and mission station & the non-maori speaking Rev H.Hansen.Turton was re-appointed to that area.

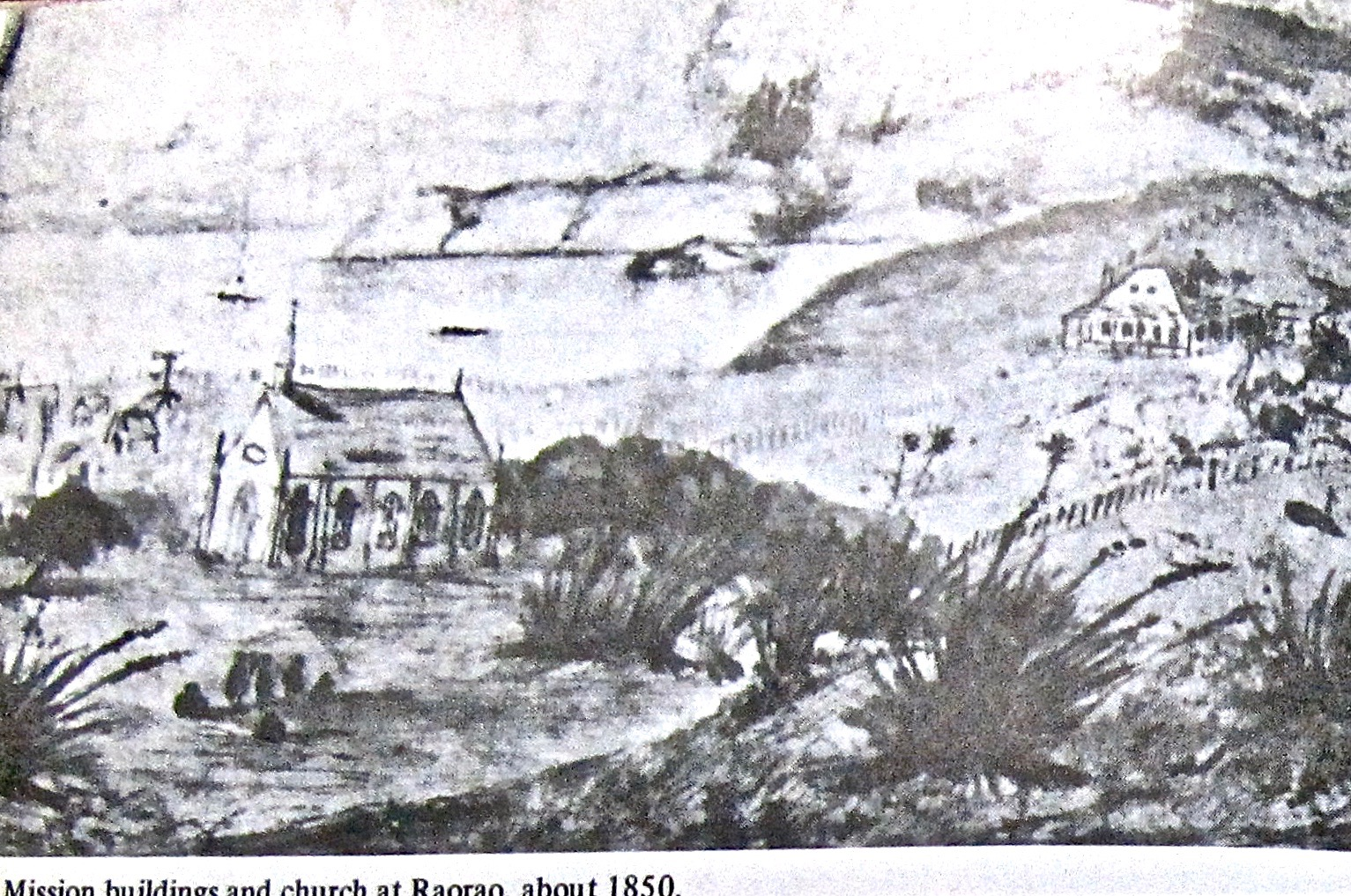
Mission buildings and church at Raorao, about 1850

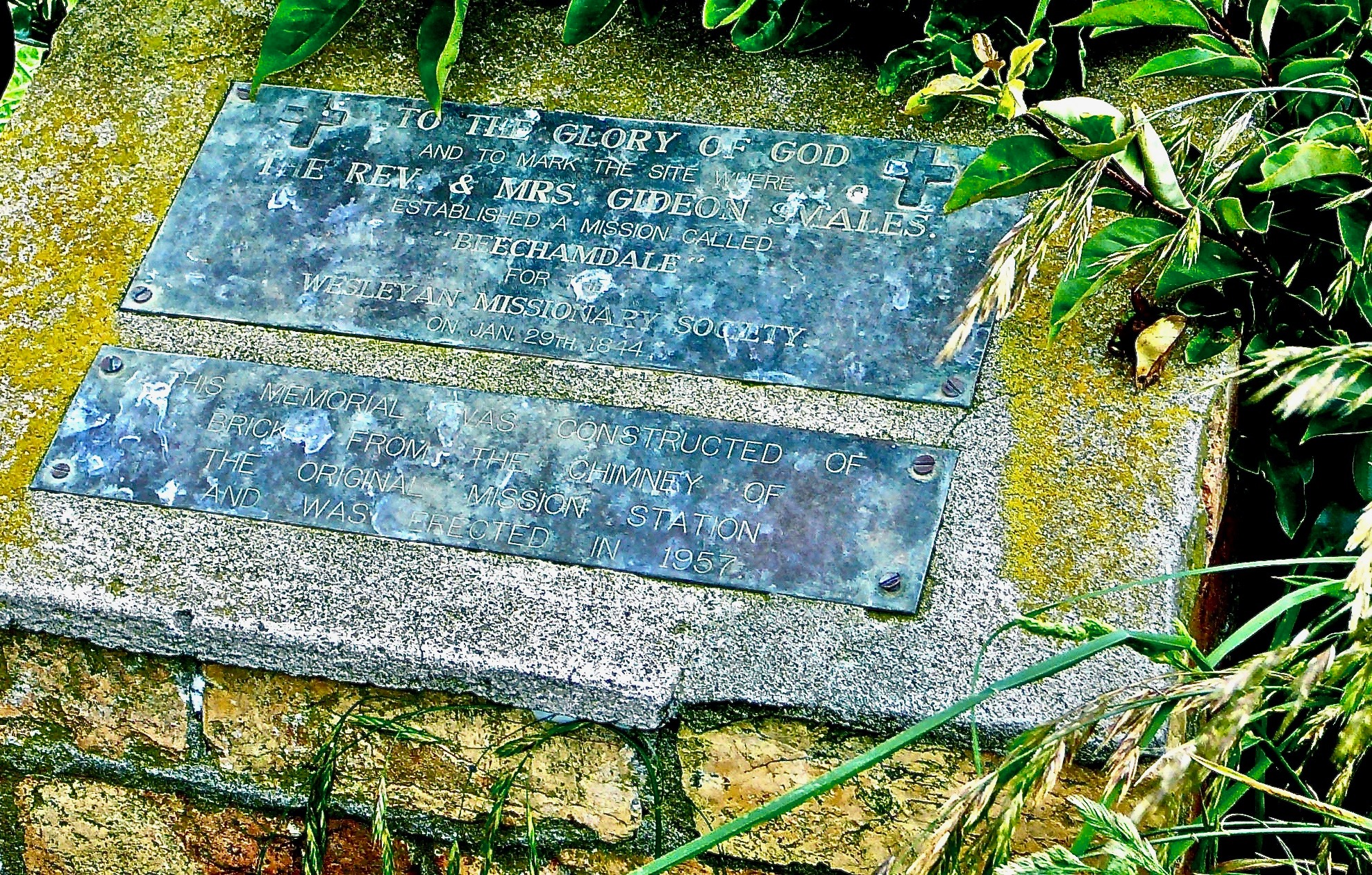
Plaque on the site of Raoraokauere mission station

In 1843 Rev. Gideon Smales was appointed to replace Rev Turton. Smales raised funding for the mission station, travelling extensively to do so & 95% of contributions were from maori. On 29 January 1844 Gideon Smales landed at Raoraokauere on the northern side of the Aotea Harbour and proceeded to build his mission – which he called BEECHAMDALE. So a farm & school had been established growing wheat "In 1844, they reaped throughout the Circuit not more than twenty acres of wheat...in 1845, about eighty...in 1846, one hundred and fifty...and this year they will reap about two hundred acres of wheat besides a small patch of oats, and another of barley.

A good portion of their wheat has been sold to traders for calico, and print, and sent to Auckland, and other Anglo-New Zealand towns by small vessels. They have used what they retained for their own consumption, in some cases, by simply boiling the wheat; in others, as kororirori, or boiled flour and water; (with sugar, when it could be obtained) and very often in the form of bread.

The school opened in 1898 and appears to have closed by July 1904, due to sickness of its teachers, though a replacement was appointed in April that year.

=== Water flour mill ===
To grind their wheat, the labour and expense of hand-mills was found to be too heavy; and during last year, we managed to erect an excellent little water flour-mill. This is the first thing of.the kind that has been erected for the natives of New Zealand; and I am glad to learn that other three parties are now arranging to follow this praiseworthy example of our people.

The expense of the labour of the mill-wright alone was eighty pounds, which amount they paid with an ox and pigs; a large sum for so poor a people. Many of them have had to shiver out the whole winter in their tattered blankets, in consequence of this, to them, extraordinary effort.

But the result is interesting.. It is extremely gratifying to see two or three old veterans in barbarous life sitting for hours near the water-wheel; its brisk, rattling noise seems to impart a new life into their warrior hardened souls.

And as if just awakened from the long sleep of barbarism, the sudden turn of civilization appears to impart a vivacity, and cheerfulness to which they have hitherto, been strangers. They chat with a new interest and vigor around the machinery, whilst the water dashes and foams beneath their feet.

Innumerable are the advantages resulting from the progress of Christianity here, as in other parts. I am not aware that there has been a single case either of infanticide or murder, as the consequence of witchcraft, in the circuit, since the beginning of 1844.

Te Aotūroa took the name Hone Waitere in honor of John Whitley (or Hone Waitere to Kawhia Maori) as they were friends but also around New Zealand other Wesleyan Maori were naming themselves or their sons after John Whiteley(Hone Waitere)

Te Aotūroa Hōne Waitere married Pirihira (Ngāti Te Wehi/Koura) and raised their daughter Meri and 2 sons Te Moke II and Ngatokorua Hone Waitere (b.1842) at Aotea Harbor.

Ngatokorua Hone Waitere & Wife Hingaia Mahara (Ngati Horokatere) left Aotea Harbor during the 1863/64 Land Grab Wars and rode on horses to Thames therefore not fighting with the pakeha and retaining their mana whenua on return and built a whare at Kaitenaki then later at Te Maari. Large tracts of confiscated land owned by other Ngāti Te Wehi descendants are still to be addressed with the crown as the Great Te Wehi coveted more land with the killing of Toa-angiangi and added it to his huge holding. Ngatokorua Hone Waitere is shown in this picture taken Feb 1934 at 92 years old with his son Wiri Toko Waitere & grandsons (waka carver)Tutemahurangi(Ned) & Hone Joe Waitere.

Therefore, Ngāti Te Wehi is connected to & supports The King movement Te Kingitanga, as one of Ngāti Te Wehi Marae 'Okapu Marae Te Kotahitanga ō Ngāti Te Wehi' are part of the 29 Marae who hold an Annual General Poukai, 14 March of every year. The first Poukai was held at Raoraokauere then in the early 1800s by Motakotako Marae Te Ohaaki ō Mahuta which was given to Makomako Te Tihi ō Moerangi but at that time Makomako, Te Tihi ō Moerangi was called Kaokao in 1896 and finally placed the Poukai with Okapu Marae in 1897 making the Poukai at Okapu Marae 119 years old.

== Government ==
Ngati Te Wehi iwi continue to seek redress with the Crown and Waitangi Tribunal over grievances during the New Zealand Wars and European colonisation. The first hearing was scheduled and held at Waipapa Marae hosted by Ngati Hikairo on 7 October 2013 Ngati Te Wehi are awaiting the outcome before negotiations can proceed.

== Marae and wharenui ==
There are 11 marae (meeting ground) affiliated to Ngati Mahuta. Most include a wharenui (meeting house).

=== Aotea Harbour ===
- Mokai Kainga Marae and Kote Mokai wharenui on 111 Aotea Rd, Aotea, Kawhia 3889, New Zealand
- Ōkapu marae and Te Kotahitanga o Ngāti Te Weehi wharenui on 4 Aotea Road in Kāwhia
- Mōtakotako marae and Te Ōhākī a Mahuta wharenui on Phillips Road
- Te Papatapu (Te Wehi) marae and Pare Whakarukuruku wharenui on Te Papatapu Road
- Te Tihi o Moerangi marae and wharenui on Kāwhia Road

=== Kāwhia Harbour ===
- Maketū marae and Auau ki te Rangi wharenui on Kaora Street in Kāwhia
- Waipapa Marae and Takuhiahia wharenui on 5491 Kawhia Rd, Aotea, Kawhia 3889, New Zealand
- Āruka marae and Tahaaroa wharenui on Āruka Marae Road in Taharoa
- Te Kōraha marae and Te Ōhākī wharenui on Taharoa Road in Taharoa

=== Ngāruawāhia ===
- Tūrangawaewae marae and Mahinaarangi / Turongo wharenui on River Road
- Waikeri – Tangirau marae on Old Taupiri Road

== See also ==
- List of Māori iwi
