= Lake Parangi =

Lake in Waikato, New Zealand

- Location within North Island
- Location: Ōtorohanga District, Waikato region, North Island
- Coordinates: 38°2′15″S 174°48′41″E
- Type: supertrophic
- Primary outflows: seepage
- Catchment area: 122 ha (300 acres)
- Basin countries: New Zealand
- Surface area: 12.18 ha (30.1 acres)
- Max. depth: 17.6 m (58 ft)
- Surface elevation: 46 m (151 ft)

Lake Parangi is a small supertrophic (i.e. saturated in phosphorus and nitrogen, with excessive phytoplankton growth after a few weeks of calm, sunny weather), dune-dammed lake 3 km north of Kawhia in the Waikato region of New Zealand. In 1937, Lake Parangi was described by the Evening Post as having, "a steep sand-cliff at one end of it and is reputed to be bottomless. Here and there are groves of gnarled pohutukawas, serving as valuable landmarks in the Sahara-like wilderness of the dunes."

Lake Parangi is in the Waikato region of the North Island.

== Biota ==
Lake Parangi has freshwater mussels, eels, pondweed Potamogeton ochreatus and watermilfoil Myriophyllum triphyllum. Catfish have been introduced and water quality is deteriorating. Canadian Waterweed has invaded much of the lake.

== See also ==
List of lakes in New Zealand
