= Oxygen demand =

Oxygen demand is an environmental chemistry term that may refer to:

- Biochemical oxygen demand (BOD), the amount of oxygen needed by organisms to break down organic material present in a water sample
- Carbonaceous biochemical oxygen demand (CBOD), the amount of oxygen needed to break down carbon compounds, excluding nitrogen compounds
- Chemical and biological oxygen demand, the combination of biochemical (BOD) and chemical oxygen demand (COD)
- Chemical oxygen demand (COD), a test commonly used to indirectly measure the amount of organic compounds in a water sample
- Nitrogenous oxygen demand (NOD), the amount of oxygen required to break down nitrogenous compounds in a water sample, like ammonia
- Theoretical oxygen demand (ThOD), the calculated amount of oxygen required to oxidize a compound to its final oxidation products
