= Lake Waikare =

Lake in the North Island of New Zealand

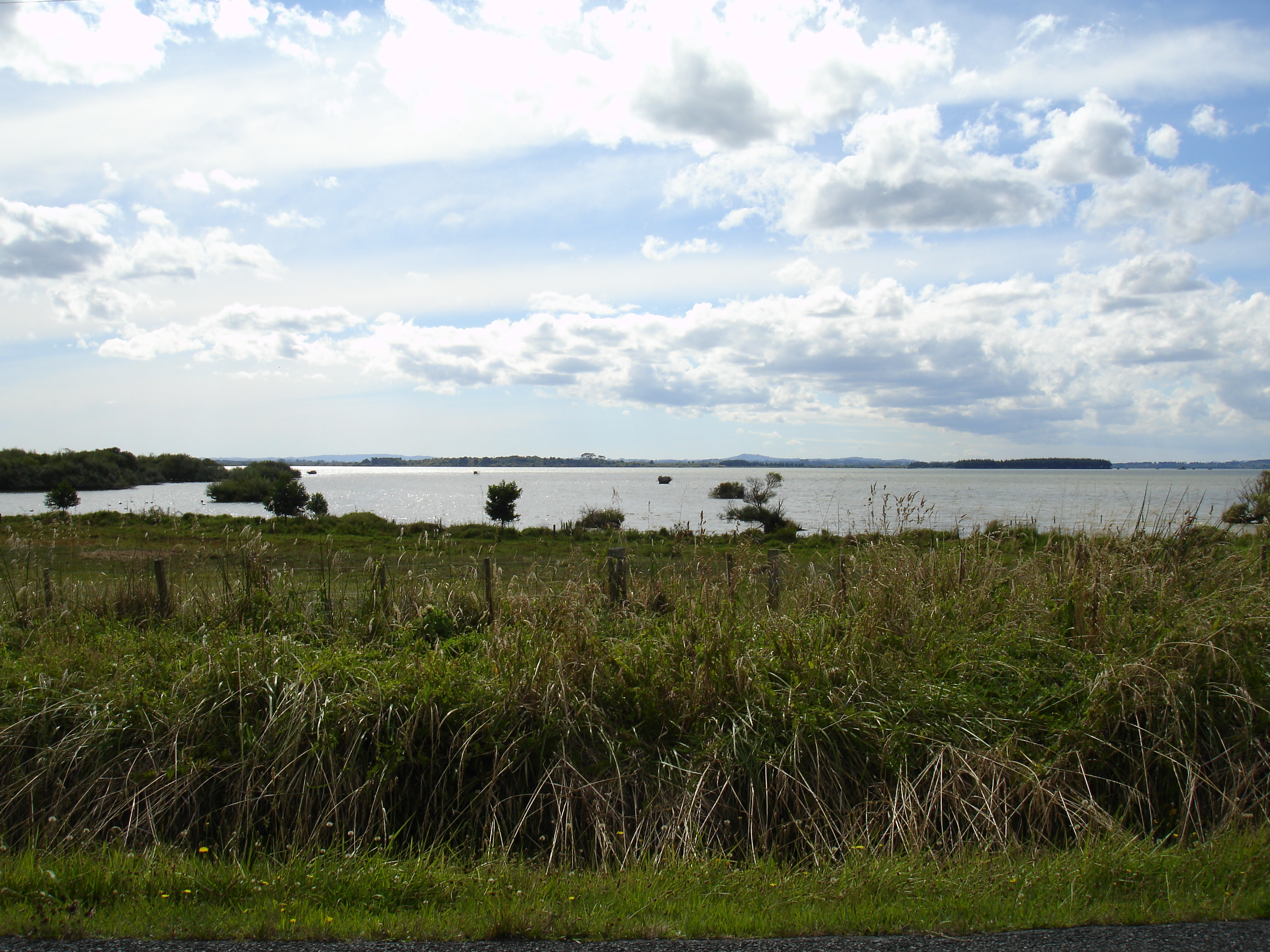
- View from the south-eastern side of the lake

- Location within New Zealand Location within North Island
- Interactive map of Lake Waikare
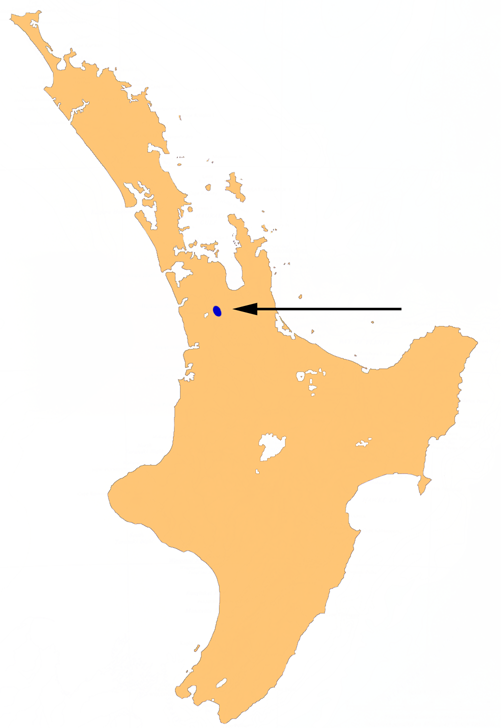
- Location: Waikato District, Waikato region, North Island
- Coordinates: 37°26′24″S 175°12′00″E
- Basin countries: New Zealand
- Surface area: 34 km^{2} (13 sq mi)

Lake Waikare is the largest of several shallow lakes in the upper floodplain of the Waikato River in New Zealand's North Island. It is a riverine lake, located to the east of Te Kauwhata and 40 kilometres north of Hamilton. It covers 34 km^{2} (13 sq mi).

Due to its shallow nature (its depth is never more than two metres) and the heavy use of fertiliser in the surrounding farming district, the waters of the lake are in poor condition. A 2010 report showed that of all the measured lakes it had the highest trophic level index, a measurement of the amount of pollutants. Pollution also comes from Te Kauwhata sewage works, which is subject to a Regional Council abatement notice for excessive discharges of Kjeldahl Nitrogen, Total Nitrogen, Total Phosphorus and E. coli. A health warning was issued in 2020 for cyanobacteria.
