= Air–fuel ratio =

Mass ratio of air to a fuel

Air–fuel ratio (AFR) is the mass ratio of air to a solid, liquid, or gaseous fuel present in a combustion process. The combustion may take place in a controlled manner such as in an internal combustion engine or industrial furnace, or may result in an explosion (e.g., a dust explosion). The air–fuel ratio determines whether a mixture is combustible at all, how much energy is being released, and how much unwanted pollution is produced in the reaction. Typically a range of air to fuel ratios exists, outside of which ignition will not occur. These are known as the lower and upper explosive limits.

In an internal combustion engine or industrial furnace, the air–fuel ratio is an important measure for anti-pollution and performance-tuning reasons. If exactly enough air is provided to completely burn all of the fuel (stoichiometric combustion), the ratio is known as the stoichiometric mixture, often abbreviated to stoich. Ratios lower than stoichiometric (where the fuel is in excess) are considered "rich". Rich mixtures are less efficient, but may produce more power and burn cooler. Ratios higher than stoichiometric (where the air is in excess) are considered "lean". Lean mixtures are more efficient but may cause higher temperatures, which can lead to the formation of nitrogen oxides. Some engines are designed with features to allow lean-burn. For precise air–fuel ratio calculations, the oxygen content of combustion air should be specified because of different air density due to different altitude or intake air temperature, possible dilution by ambient water vapor, or enrichment by oxygen additions.

== Air-fuel ratio meters ==
An air-fuel ratio meter monitors the air–fuel ratio of an internal combustion engine. Also called air–fuel ratio gauge, air–fuel meter, or air–fuel gauge, it reads the voltage output of an oxygen sensor, sometimes also called AFR sensor or lambda sensor.

The original narrow-band oxygen sensors became factory installed standard in the late 1970s and early 1980s. In recent years a newer and much more accurate wide-band sensor, though more expensive, has become available.

Most stand-alone narrow-band meters have 10 LEDs and some have more. Also common, narrow band meters in round housings with the standard mounting 52 and 67 mm (2 1/16 and 2 5/8 in) diameters, as other types of car 'gauges'. These usually have 10 or 20 LEDs. Analogue 'needle' style gauges are also available.

== Internal combustion engines ==
In theory, a stoichiometric mixture has just enough air to completely burn the available fuel. In practice, this is never quite achieved, due primarily to the very short time available in an internal combustion engine for each combustion cycle.

Most of the combustion process is completed in approximately 2 milliseconds at an engine speed of 6,000 revolutions per minute (100 revolutions per second, or 10 milliseconds per revolution of the crankshaft. For a four-stroke engine this would mean 5 milliseconds for each piston stroke, and 20 milliseconds to complete one 720 degree Otto cycle). This is the time that elapses from the spark plug firing until 90% of the fuel–air mix is combusted, typically some 80 degrees of crankshaft rotation later. Catalytic converters are designed to work best when the exhaust gases passing through them are the result of nearly perfect combustion.

A perfectly stoichiometric mixture burns very hot and can damage engine components if the engine is placed under high load at this fuel–air mixture. Due to the high flame temperatures at this mixture, detonation is possible under high load. (Detonation is known as knocking or pinging). Such detonation can cause serious engine damage as the uncontrolled burning of the fuel-air mix can create very high pressures in the cylinder. As a consequence, stoichiometric mixtures are only used under light to low-moderate load conditions. For acceleration and high-load conditions, a richer mixture (lower air–fuel ratio) is used to produce cooler combustion products and so avoid overheating of the cylinder head, and thus prevent detonation.

== Engine management systems ==
The stoichiometric mixture for a gasoline engine is the ideal ratio of air to fuel that burns all fuel with no excess air. For gasoline fuel, the stoichiometric air–fuel mixture is about 14.7:1 i.e. for every one gram of fuel, 14.7 grams of air are required. For pure octane fuel, the oxidation reaction is:

[25 O_{2} + 2 C_{8}H_{18} → 16 CO_{2} + 18 H_{2}O + energy]

Any mixture greater than 14.7:1 is considered a lean mixture; any less than 14.7:1 is a rich mixture – given perfect (ideal) "test" fuel (gasoline consisting of solely n-heptane and iso-octane). In reality, most fuels consist of a combination of heptane, octane, a handful of other alkanes, plus additives including detergents, and possibly oxygenators such as MTBE (methyl tert-butyl ether) or ethanol/methanol. These compounds all alter the stoichiometric ratio, with most of the additives pushing the ratio downward (oxygenators bring extra oxygen to the combustion event in liquid form that is released at the time of combustions; for MTBE-laden fuel, a stoichiometric ratio can be as low as 14.1:1). Vehicles that use an oxygen sensor or other feedback loops to control fuel to air ratio (lambda control), compensate automatically for this change in the fuel's stoichiometric rate by measuring the exhaust gas composition and controlling fuel volume. Vehicles without such controls (such as most motorcycles until recently, and cars predating the mid-1980s) may have difficulties running certain fuel blends (especially winter fuels used in some areas) and may require different carburetor jets (or otherwise have the fueling ratios altered) to compensate. Vehicles that use oxygen sensors can monitor the air–fuel ratio with an air–fuel ratio meter.

== Other types of engines ==
In the typical air to natural gas combustion burner, a double-cross limit strategy is employed to ensure ratio control. (This method was used in World War II). The strategy involves adding the opposite flow feedback into the limiting control of the respective gas (air or fuel). This assures ratio control within an acceptable margin.

== Other terms used ==
There are other terms commonly used when discussing the mixture of air and fuel in internal combustion engines.

=== Mixture ===
Mixture is the predominant word that appears in training texts, operation manuals, and maintenance manuals in the aviation world.

Air-fuel ratio is the ratio between the mass of air and the mass of fuel in the air-fuel mix at any given moment. The mass is the mass of all constituents that compose the air or fuel, whether they take part in the combustion or not. For example, a calculation of the mass of natural gas as fuel — which often contains carbon dioxide (CO_{2}), nitrogen (N_{2}), and various alkanes — includes the mass of the carbon dioxide, nitrogen and all alkanes in determining the value of( m_{fuel}.)

For pure octane the stoichiometric mixture is approximately 15.1:1, or λ of 1.00 exactly.

In naturally aspirated engines powered by octane, maximum power is frequently reached at AFRs ranging from 12.5 to 13.3:1 or λ of 0.850 to 0.901.

The air-fuel ratio of 12:1 is considered as the maximum output ratio, whereas the air-fuel ratio of 16:1 is considered as the maximum fuel economy ratio.

=== Fuel–air ratio (FAR) ===
Fuel–air ratio is commonly used in the gas turbine industry as well as in government studies of internal combustion engine, and refers to the ratio of fuel to the air.

$$\mathrm{FAR} = \frac{1}{\mathrm{AFR}}$$

=== Air–fuel equivalence ratio (λ) ===
Air–fuel equivalence ratio, λ (lambda), is the ratio of actual AFR to stoichiometry for a given mixture. λ = 1.0 is at stoichiometry, rich mixtures λ < 1.0, and lean mixtures λ > 1.0.

There is a direct relationship between λ and AFR. To calculate AFR from a given λ, multiply the measured λ by the stoichiometric AFR for that fuel. Alternatively, to recover λ from an AFR, divide AFR by the stoichiometric AFR for that fuel. This last equation is often used as the definition of λ:

$$\lambda = \frac{\mathrm{AFR}}{\mathrm{AFR}_\text{stoich}}$$

Because the composition of common fuels varies seasonally, and because many modern vehicles can handle different fuels when tuning, it makes more sense to talk about λ values rather than AFR.

Most practical AFR devices actually measure the amount of residual oxygen (for lean mixes) or unburnt hydrocarbons (for rich mixtures) in the exhaust gas.

=== Fuel–air equivalence ratio (Φ) ===
The fuel–air equivalence ratio, Φ (phi), of a system is defined as the ratio of the fuel-to-oxidizer ratio to the stoichiometric fuel-to-oxidizer ratio. Mathematically,

$$\phi = \frac{\mbox{fuel-to-oxidizer ratio}}{(\mbox{fuel-to-oxidizer ratio})_\text{st}} = \frac{m_\text{fuel}/m_\text{ox}}{\left(m_\text{fuel}/m_\text{ox}\right)_\text{st}} = \frac{n_\text{fuel}/n_\text{ox}}{\left(n_\text{fuel}/n_\text{ox}\right)_\text{st}}$$

where m represents the mass, n represents a number of moles, subscript st stands for stoichiometric conditions.

The advantage of using equivalence ratio over fuel–oxidizer ratio is that it takes into account (and is therefore independent of) both mass and molar values for the fuel and the oxidizer. Consider, for example, a mixture of one mole of ethane (C_{2}H_{6}) and one mole of oxygen (O_{2}). The fuel–oxidizer ratio of this mixture based on the mass of fuel and air is

$$\frac{m_\ce{C2H6}}{m_\ce{O2}} = \frac{1 \times (2\times12+6\times1)}{1 \times (2\times16)} = \frac{30}{32} = 0.9375$$

and the fuel-oxidizer ratio of this mixture based on the number of moles of fuel and air is

$$\frac{n_\ce{C2H6}}{n_\ce{O2}} = \frac{1}{1} = 1$$

Clearly the two values are not equal. To compare it with the equivalence ratio, we need to determine the fuel–oxidizer ratio of ethane and oxygen mixture. For this we need to consider the stoichiometric reaction of ethane and oxygen,

C_{2}H_{6} + 7/2 O_{2} → 2 CO_{2} + 3 H_{2}O

This gives

$$(\text{fuel-to-oxidizer ratio based on mass})_\text{st} = \left(\frac{m_\ce{C2H6}}{m_\ce{O2}}\right)_\text{st} = \frac{1 \times (2 \times 12 + 6 \times 1)}{3.5 \times (2 \times 16)} = \frac{30}{112} = 0.268$$
$$(\text{fuel-to-oxidizer ratio based on number of moles})_\text{st} = \left(\frac{n_\ce{C2H6}}{n_\ce{O2}}\right)_\text{st} = \frac{1}{3.5} = 0.286$$

Thus we can determine the equivalence ratio of the given mixture as

$$\phi = \frac{m_\ce{C2H6}/m_\ce{O2}}{\left(m_\ce{C2H6}/m_\ce{O2}\right)_\text{st}} = \frac{0.938}{0.268} = 3.5$$

or, equivalently, as

$$\phi = \frac{n_\ce{C2H6}/n_\ce{O2}}{\left(n_\ce{C2H6}/n_\ce{O2}\right)_\text{st}} = \frac{1}{0.286} = 3.5$$

Another advantage of using the equivalence ratio is that ratios greater than one always mean there is more fuel in the fuel–oxidizer mixture than required for complete combustion (stoichiometric reaction), irrespective of the fuel and oxidizer being used—while ratios less than one represent a deficiency of fuel or equivalently excess oxidizer in the mixture. This is not the case if one uses fuel–oxidizer ratio, which takes different values for different mixtures.

The fuel–air equivalence ratio is related to the air–fuel equivalence ratio (defined previously) as follows:

$$\phi = \frac{1}{\lambda}$$

=== Mixture fraction ===
The relative amounts of oxygen enrichment and fuel dilution can be quantified by the mixture fraction, Z, defined as

$$Z = \left[ \frac{s Y_\mathrm{F} - Y_\mathrm{O} + Y_\mathrm{O,0}}{s Y_\mathrm{F,0} + Y_\mathrm{O,0}} \right]$$,

where

$$s = \mathrm{AFR}_\mathrm{stoich} = \frac{W_\mathrm{O} \times v_\mathrm{O}}{W_\mathrm{F} \times v_\mathrm{F}}$$,

Y_{F,0} and Y_{O,0} represent the fuel and oxidizer mass fractions at the inlet, W_{F} and W_{O} are the species molecular weights, and v_{F} and v_{O} are the fuel and oxygen stoichiometric coefficients, respectively. The stoichiometric mixture fraction is

$Z_\mathrm{st} = \left[ \frac{1}{1 + \frac{Y_\mathrm{F,0} \times W_\mathrm{O} \times v_\mathrm{O}}{Y_\mathrm{O,0} \times W_\mathrm{F} \times v_\mathrm{F}}} \right ]$

The stoichiometric mixture fraction is related to λ (lambda) and Φ (phi) by the equations

$$Z_\text{st} = \frac{\lambda}{1+\lambda} = \frac{1}{1+\phi}$$,

assuming

$\mathrm{AFR} = \frac{Y_\mathrm{O,0}}{Y_\mathrm{F,0}}$

=== Percent excess combustion air ===
Ideal stoichiometry

In industrial fired heaters, power plant steam generators, and large gas-fired turbines, the more common terms are percent excess combustion air and percent stoichiometric air. For example, excess combustion air of 15 percent means that 15 percent more than the required stoichiometric air (or 115 percent of stoichiometric air) is being used.

A combustion control point can be defined by specifying the percent excess air (or oxygen) in the oxidant, or by specifying the percent oxygen in the combustion product. An air–fuel ratio meter may be used to measure the percent oxygen in the combustion gas, from which the percent excess oxygen can be calculated from stoichiometry and a mass balance for fuel combustion. For example, for propane (C_{3}H_{8}) combustion between stoichiometric and 30 percent excess air (AFR_{mass} between 15.58 and 20.3), the relationship between percent excess air and percent oxygen is:

$$\begin{align}
\mathrm{Mass\% \ O_2 \ in \ propane \ combustion \ gas} &\approx -0.1433(\mathrm{\% \ excess \ O_2})^2 + 0.214(\mathrm{\% \ excess \ O_2}) \\
\mathrm{Volume\% \ O_2 \ in \ propane \ combustion \ gas} &\approx -0.1208(\mathrm{\% \ excess \ O_2})^2 + 0.186(\mathrm{\% \ excess \ O_2})
\end{align}$$

== See also ==
- Adiabatic flame temperature
- Mass flow sensor
- Stoichiometric air-to-fuel ratio of common fuels
- Exhaust gas analyzer
