= Exhaust gas analyzer =

Scientific equipment used for enforcement of safety standards

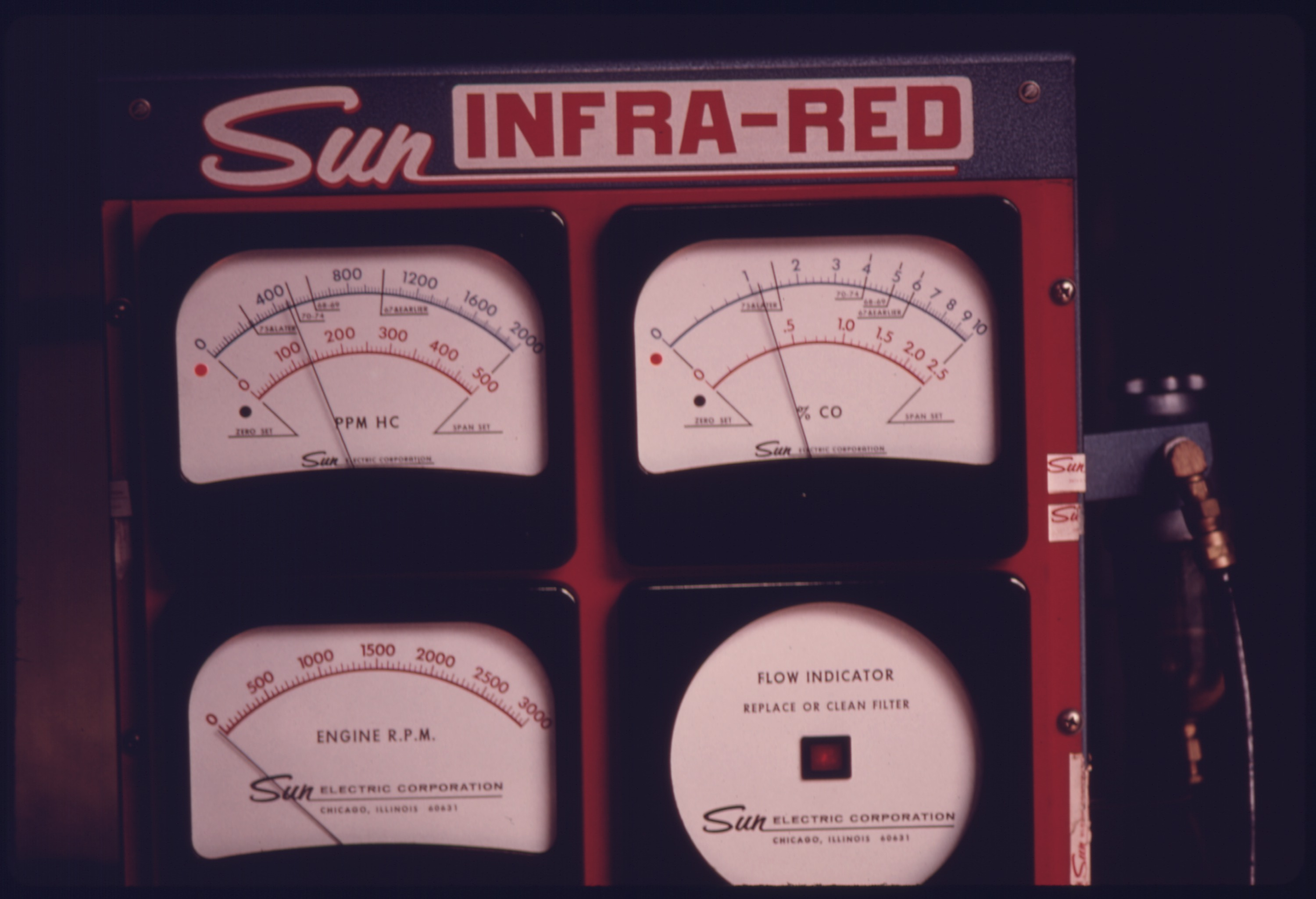
A classical exhaust gas analyser

An exhaust gas analyser or exhaust carbon monoxide (CO) analyser is an instrument for the measurement of carbon monoxide among other gases in exhaust, caused by inefficient or incorrect combustion. Lambda coefficient measurement is the most common method.

The principles used for CO sensors (and other types of gas) are infrared gas sensors and chemical gas sensors. Carbon monoxide sensors are used to assess the CO amount during an Ministry of Transport test. In order to be used for such test it must be approved as suitable for use in the scheme. In the UK, a list of acceptable exhaust gas analysers for use within the MOT test is available via the Driver and Vehicle Standards Agency website.

== Lambda coefficient measurement ==
The presence of oxygen in the exhaust gases indicates that the combustion of the mixture was not perfect, resulting in contaminant gases. Thus measuring the proportion of oxygen in the exhaust gases of these engines can monitor and measure these emissions. This measurement is performed in the MOT test through Lambda coefficient measurement.

The Lambda coefficient (λ) is obtained from the relationship between air and gasoline involved in combustion of the mixture. It is a measure of the efficiency of the gasoline engine by measuring the percentage of oxygen in the exhaust.

When gasoline engines operate with a stoichiometric mixture of 14.7: 1 the value of lambda (λ) is "1".

Mixing ratio = weight of fuel / weight of air

- Expressed as mass ratio: 14.7 kg of air per 1 kg. of fuel.
- Expressed as volume ratio: 10,000 liters of air per 1 liter of fuel.

With this relationship theoretically a complete combustion of gasoline is achieved and greenhouse gas emissions would be minimal. The coefficient is defined as Lambda coefficient:

If Lambda > 1 = lean mixture, excess of air. If Lambda < 1 = rich mixture, excess of gasoline.

- A lean mixture contains an excess of oxygen. The surplus oxygen will react with nitrogen to (oxides of nitrogen), if the temperature is high enough (around 1600 °C) for enough time to permit so.
- A rich mixture contains a deficit of oxygen. This makes it impossible for all fuel to combust completely to carbon dioxide and water vapour. Hence, some fuel will remain as a hydrocarbon, or it will react only to carbon monoxide (CO). The carbon monoxide concentration in exhaust gases is closely related, and almost proportional to the air fuel ratio in the rich regions. It is, therefore, of great value when tuning an engine.
- Carbon dioxide emitted is theoretically directly proportional to the fuel consumed at a given and constant air fuel ratio. Less carbon dioxide will be emitted per litre of fuel if λ < 1, since some fuel won't be able to combust completely.

== Types of sensors ==
=== Chemical CO sensors ===
- Chemical CO gas sensors with sensitive layers based on polymer- or heteropolysiloxane have the principal advantage of a very low energy consumption, and can be reduced in size to fit into microelectronic-based systems. On the downside, short- and long term drift effects as well as a rather low overall lifetime are major obstacles when compared with the nondispersive infrared sensor measurement principle.
- Another method (Henry's Law) also can be used to measure the amount of dissolved CO in a liquid, if the amount of foreign gases is insignificant.

=== Nondispersive infrared CO sensors ===
Nondispersive infrared sensors are spectroscopic sensors to detect CO in a gaseous environment by its characteristic absorption. The key components are an infrared source, a light tube, an interference (wavelength) filter, and an infrared detector. The gas is pumped or diffuses into the light tube, and the electronics measures the absorption of the characteristic wavelength of light. Sensors are most often used for measuring carbon monoxide. The best of these have sensitivities of 20–50 PPM.

Most CO sensors are fully calibrated prior to shipping from the factory. Over time, the zero point of the sensor needs to be calibrated to maintain the long term stability of the sensor. New developments include using microelectromechanical systems to bring down the costs of this sensor and to create smaller devices. Typical sensors cost in the (US) $100 to $1000 range.

== Cambridge indicator ==
Used by older aircraft, the Cambridge Mixture Indicator displayed air-fuel ratio by measuring the thermal conductivity of exhaust gas. It was manufactured by the Cambridge Instrument Company. This device was installed on airplanes in the 1930s, including the Lockheed Model 10 Electra flown by Amelia Earhart on her last flight.

== See also ==
- AFR sensor
- Oxygen sensor
- Auto mechanic
- Automobile repair shop
- Car ramp, a means of accessing the underside of a vehicle
- Engine tuning
- Italian tuneup
- Mechanical engineering
- Service (motor vehicle)
