= Oxygen sensor =

Device for measuring oxygen concentration

An oxygen sensor is an electronic component that detects the concentration of oxygen molecules in the air or a gas matrix such as in a combustion engine exhaust gas.

For automotive applications, an oxygen sensor is referred to as a lambda sensor, where lambda refers to the air–fuel equivalence ratio, usually denoted by λ. It was developed by Robert Bosch GmbH during the late 1960s under the supervision of Günter Bauman. The original sensing element is made with a thimble-shaped zirconia ceramic coated on both the exhaust and reference sides with a thin layer of platinum and comes in both heated and unheated forms. The planar-style sensor entered the market in 1990 and significantly reduced the mass of the ceramic sensing element, as well as incorporating the heater within the ceramic structure. This resulted in a sensor that started sooner and responded faster.

The most common application is to measure the exhaust-gas concentration of oxygen for internal combustion engines in automobiles and other vehicles in order to calculate and, if required, dynamically adjust the air-fuel ratio so that catalytic converters can work optimally, and also determine whether the converter is performing properly or not. An oxygen sensor will typically generate up to about 0.9 volts when the fuel mixture is rich and there is little unburned oxygen in the exhaust.

Scientists use oxygen sensors to measure respiration or production of oxygen and use a different approach. Oxygen sensors are used in oxygen analyzers, which find extensive use in medical applications such as anesthesia monitors, respirators and oxygen concentrators.

Divers use oxygen sensors (and often call them ppO_{2} sensors) to measure the partial pressure of oxygen in their breathing gas. Open circuit scuba divers test the gas before diving as the mixture remains unchanged during the dive and partial pressure changes due to pressure are simply predictable, while mixed gas rebreather divers must monitor the partial pressure of oxygen in the breathing loop throughout the dive, as it changes and must be controlled to stay within acceptable bounds.

Oxygen sensors are also used in hypoxic air fire prevention systems to continuously monitor the oxygen concentration inside the protected volumes.

There are many different ways of measuring oxygen. These include technologies such as zirconia, electrochemical (also known as galvanic), infrared, ultrasonic, paramagnetic, and very recently, laser methods.

== Automotive applications ==
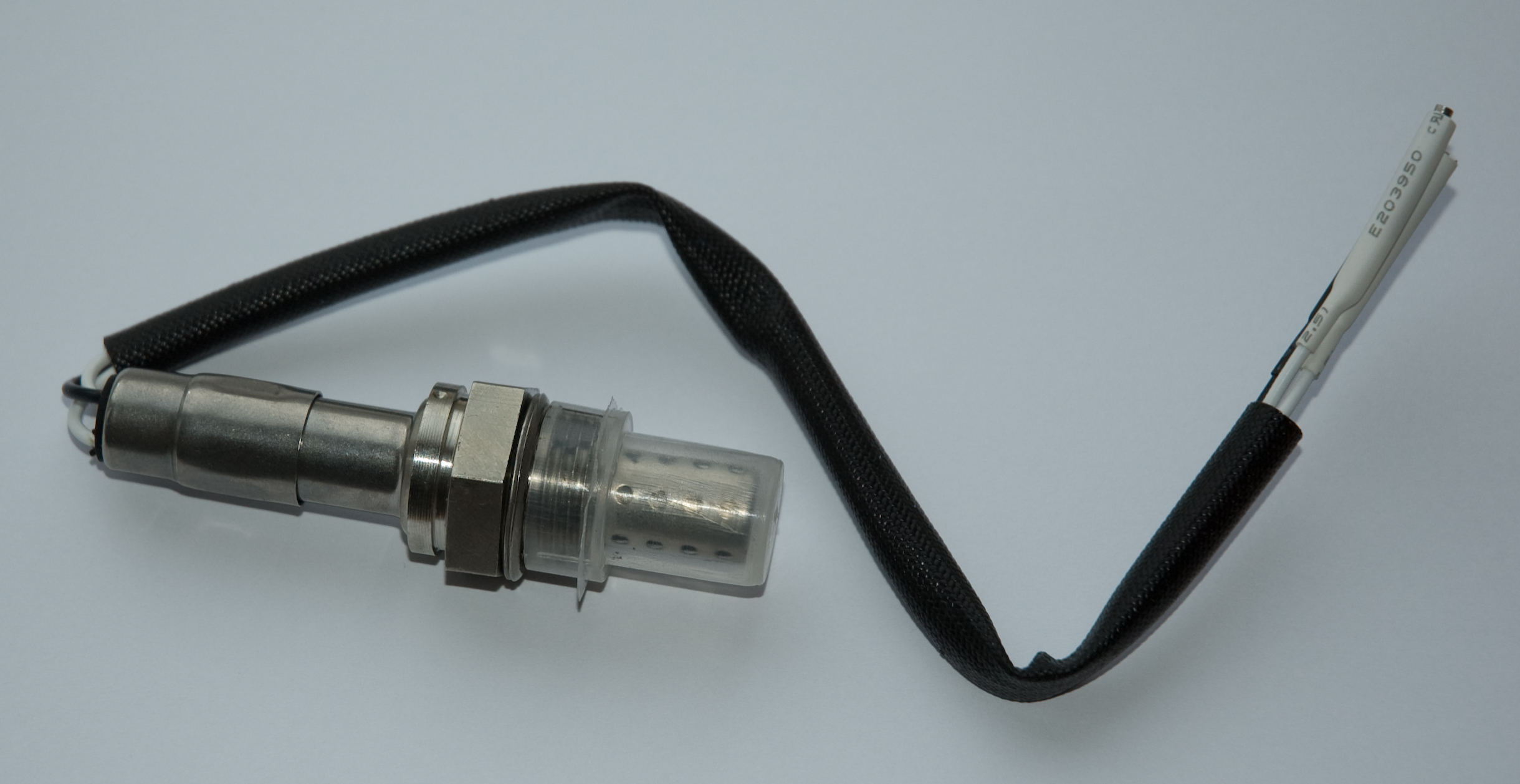
A three-wire oxygen sensor suitable for use in a Volvo 240 or similar vehicle

Automotive oxygen sensors, colloquially known as O_{2} sensors, make modern electronic fuel injection and emission control possible. They help determine, in real time, whether the air–fuel ratio of a combustion engine is rich or lean. Since oxygen sensors are located in the exhaust stream, they do not directly measure the air or the fuel entering the engine. Still, when information from oxygen sensors is combined with that from other sources, it can be used to determine the air–fuel ratio indirectly. Closed-loop feedback-controlled fuel injection varies the fuel injector output according to real-time sensor data rather than operating with a predetermined (open-loop) fuel map. In addition to enabling efficient electronic fuel injection, this emissions control technique can reduce the amounts of both unburnt fuel and oxides of nitrogen entering the atmosphere. Unburnt fuel is pollution in the form of air-borne hydrocarbons. At the same time, oxides of nitrogen (NO_{x} gases) are a result of combustion chamber temperatures exceeding 1300 kelvin, due to excess air in the fuel mixture, thereby contributing to smog and acid rain. Volvo was the first automobile manufacturer to employ this technology in 1976, along with the three-way catalyst used in the catalytic converter.

The sensor does not actually measure oxygen concentration, but rather the difference between the oxygen content of the exhaust gas and that of the air. Rich mixture causes an oxygen demand. This demand causes the voltage output to rise as oxygen ions are transported through the sensor layer. A lean mixture causes low voltage because there is an oxygen excess.

Modern spark-ignited combustion engines use oxygen sensors and catalytic converters to reduce exhaust emissions. Information on oxygen concentration is sent to the engine management computer or engine control unit (ECU), which adjusts the amount of fuel injected into the engine to compensate for excess air or excess fuel. The ECU attempts to maintain, on average, a specific air-fuel ratio by interpreting information from the oxygen sensor. The primary goal is a compromise between power, fuel economy, and emissions, and in most cases is achieved by an air–fuel ratio close to stoichiometric. For spark-ignition engines (such as those that burn gasoline or autogas / liquefied petroleum gas (LPG), as opposed to diesel), the three types of emissions modern systems are concerned with are: hydrocarbons (which are released when the fuel is not burnt completely, such as when misfiring or running rich), carbon monoxide (which is the result of running slightly rich) and NO_{x} (which dominate when the mixture is lean). Failure of these sensors, either through normal aging, the use of leaded fuels, or fuel contaminated with silicones or silicates, for example, can lead to damage of an automobile's catalytic converter and expensive repairs.

Tampering with or modifying the signal that the oxygen sensor sends to the engine computer can be detrimental to emissions control and can even damage the vehicle. When the engine is under low-load conditions (such as when accelerating very gently or maintaining a constant speed), it is operating in "closed-loop mode". This refers to a feedback loop between the ECU and the oxygen sensor(s), in which the ECU adjusts the amount of fuel and expects to see a resulting change in the oxygen sensor's response. This loop forces the engine to operate both slightly lean and slightly rich on successive loops, as it attempts to maintain a mostly stoichiometric ratio on average. Suppose modifications cause the engine to run moderately lean. In that case, there will be a slight increase in fuel efficiency, sometimes at the expense of increased NO_{x} emissions, much higher exhaust gas temperatures, and sometimes a slight increase in power that can quickly turn into misfires and a drastic loss of power, as well as potential engine and catalytic-converter (due to the misfires) damage, at ultra-lean air–fuel ratios. Suppose modifications cause the engine to run rich. In that case, there will be a slight increase in power up to a point (after which the engine starts flooding from too much unburned fuel), at the cost of decreased fuel efficiency and increased unburned hydrocarbons in the exhaust, which can cause overheating of the catalytic converter. Prolonged operation at rich mixtures can cause catastrophic failure of the catalytic converter (see backfire). The ECU also controls the spark engine timing and the fuel-injector pulse width, so modifications that cause the engine to operate either too lean or too rich may result in inefficient fuel consumption when the fuel is ignited too soon or too late in the combustion cycle.

When an internal combustion engine is under high load (e.g. wide open throttle), the output of the oxygen sensor is ignored, and the ECU automatically enriches the mixture to protect the engine, as misfires under load are much more likely to cause damage. This is referred to as an engine running in "open-loop mode". Any changes in the sensor output will be ignored in this state. In many cars (except for some turbocharged models), inputs from the air flow meter are also ignored, as they might otherwise lower engine performance due to the mixture being too rich or too lean, and increase the risk of engine damage due to detonation if the mixture is too lean.

=== Function of an O_{2} sensor ===
O_{2} sensors provide feedback to an engine control unit (ECU). Where applicable, gasoline, propane, and natural gas engines are fitted with three-way catalysts to comply with on-road vehicle emissions legislation. Using the O_{2} sensor signal, the ECU can operate the engine with an air–fuel ratio very close to 14.7:1, which is the ideal operating mixture for a three-way catalyst to be effective. Robert Bosch GmbH introduced the first automotive lambda sensor in 1976, and it was first used by Volvo and Saab in that year. The sensors were introduced in the US from approximately 1979 and were required on all car models in many European countries by 1993.

=== The probe ===
The sensor element is a ceramic cylinder, plated on the inside and outside with porous platinum electrodes; a metal gauze protects the whole assembly. It operates by measuring the difference in oxygen between the exhaust gas and the external air, generating a voltage or changing its resistance accordingly.

The sensors only begin to work effectively when heated to approximately 316 °C (600 °F), so most newer lambda probes have heating elements encased in the ceramic that bring the ceramic tip up to temperature quickly. Older probes without heating elements would eventually heat up from the exhaust. Still, there is a time lag between when the engine is started and when the components in the exhaust system reach thermal equilibrium. The time required for the exhaust gases to bring the probe to temperature depends on the ambient air temperature and the geometry of the exhaust system. Without a heater, the process may take several minutes. There are pollution problems attributed to this slow start-up process, including a similar issue with the catalytic converter's working temperature.

The probe typically has four wires attached: two for the lambda output and two for the heater power. However, some automakers use the metal case as ground for the sensor element signal, resulting in three wires. Earlier non-electrically-heated sensors had one or two wires.

=== Operation of the probe ===
==== Zirconia sensor ====
A planar zirconia sensor (schematic picture)

The zirconium dioxide, or zirconia, lambda sensor is based on a solid-state electrochemical fuel cell called the Nernst cell. Its two electrodes provide an output voltage corresponding to the quantity of oxygen in the exhaust relative to that in the atmosphere.

An output voltage of 0.2 V (200 mV) DC represents a "lean mixture" of fuel and oxygen, where the amount of oxygen entering the cylinder is sufficient to fully oxidize the carbon monoxide (CO), produced in burning the air and fuel, into carbon dioxide (CO_{2}). An output voltage of 0.8 V (800 mV) DC represents a "rich mixture", which is high in unburned fuel and low in remaining oxygen. The ideal setpoint is approximately 0.45 V (450 mV) DC. This is where the quantities of air and fuel are in the optimal ratio, which is ~0.5% lean of the stoichiometric point, such that the exhaust output contains minimal carbon monoxide.

The voltage produced by the sensor is nonlinear with respect to oxygen concentration. The sensor is most sensitive near the stoichiometric point (where λ = 1) and less sensitive when either very lean or very rich.

The ECU is a control system that uses feedback from the sensor to adjust the fuel/air mixture. As in all control systems, the time constant of the sensor is important; the ability of the ECU to control the fuel–air ratio depends upon the response time of the sensor. An aging or fouled sensor tends to have a slower response time, which can degrade system performance. The shorter the time period, the higher the so-called "cross count" and the more responsive the system.

The sensor has a rugged stainless-steel construction internally and externally. Due to this the sensor has a high resistance to corrosion, allowing it to be used effectively in aggressive environments with high temperature/pressure.

The zirconia sensor is of the "narrow-band" type, referring to the narrow range of fuel/air ratios to which it responds.

==== Wideband zirconia sensor ====
A planar wideband zirconia sensor (schematic picture)

A variation on the zirconia sensor, called the "wideband" sensor, was introduced by NTK in 1992 and has been widely used for car engine management systems in order to meet the ever-increasing demands for better fuel economy, lower emissions and better engine performance at the same time. It is based on a planar zirconia element, but also incorporates an electrochemical gas pump. An electronic circuit containing a feedback loop controls the gas-pump current to keep the output of the electrochemical cell constant, so that the pump current directly indicates the oxygen content of the exhaust gas. This sensor eliminates the lean–rich cycling inherent in narrow-band sensors, allowing the control unit to adjust the fuel delivery and ignition timing of the engine much more rapidly. In the automotive industry this sensor is also called a UEGO (universal exhaust-gas oxygen) sensor. UEGO sensors are also commonly used in aftermarket dyno tuning and high-performance driver air–fuel display equipment. The wideband zirconia sensor is used in stratified fuel injection systems and can now also be used in diesel engines to satisfy the upcoming EURO and ULEV emission limits.

Wideband sensors have three elements:

1. ion oxygen pump
2. narrowband zirconia sensor
3. heating element

The wiring diagram for the wideband sensor typically has six wires:

1. resistive heating element
2. resistive heating element
3. sensor
4. pump
5. calibration resistor
6. common

==== Titania sensor ====
A less common type of narrow-band lambda sensor has a ceramic element made of titania (titanium dioxide). This type does not generate its own voltage, but changes its electrical resistance in response to the oxygen concentration. The resistance of the titania is a function of the oxygen partial pressure and the temperature. Therefore, some sensors are used with a gas-temperature sensor to compensate for the resistance change due to temperature. The resistance value at any temperature is about 1/1000 the change in oxygen concentration. Luckily, at λ = 1, there is a large change of oxygen, so the resistance change is typically 1000 times between rich and lean, depending on the temperature.

As titania is an N-type semiconductor with a structure TiO_{2−x}, the x defects in the crystal lattice conduct the charge. So, for fuel-rich exhaust (lower oxygen concentration) the resistance is low, and for fuel-lean exhaust (higher oxygen concentration) the resistance is high. The control unit feeds the sensor with a small electric current and measures the resulting voltage drop across the sensor, which varies from nearly 0 volts to about 5 volts. Like the zirconia sensor, this type is nonlinear, such that it is sometimes simplistically described as a binary indicator, reading either "rich" or "lean". Titania sensors are more expensive than zirconia sensors, but they also respond faster.

In automotive applications the titania sensor, unlike the zirconia sensor, does not require a reference sample of atmospheric air to operate properly. This makes the sensor assembly easier to design against water contamination. While most automotive sensors are submersible, zirconia-based sensors require a very small supply of reference air from the atmosphere. In theory, the sensor wire harness and connector are sealed. Air that leaches through the wire harness to the sensor is assumed to come from an open point in the harness – usually the ECU, which is housed in an enclosed space like the trunk or vehicle interior.

=== Location of the probe in a system ===
Diagram of the lambda control system and location of the lambda sensor

The probe is typically screwed into a threaded hole in the exhaust system, located after the branch manifold of the exhaust system combines and before the catalytic converter. New vehicles are required to have a sensor before and after the exhaust catalyst to meet U.S. regulations requiring that all emissions components be monitored for failure. Pre- and post-catalyst signals are monitored to determine catalyst efficiency, and if the converter is not performing as expected, an alert gets reported to the user through on-board diagnostics systems by, for example, lighting up an indicator in the vehicle's dashboard. Additionally, some catalyst systems require brief cycles of lean (oxygen-containing) gas to load the catalyst and promote additional oxidation reduction of undesirable exhaust components.

=== Sensor surveillance ===
Oxygen sensor voltage while driving

The air–fuel ratio and naturally, the status of the sensor, can be monitored by means of using an air–fuel ratio meter that displays the output voltage of the sensor.

=== Sensor failures ===
Normally, the lifetime of an unheated sensor is about 30,000 to 50,000 miles (50,000 to 80,000 km). Heated sensor lifetime is typically 100,000 miles (160,000 km). Failure of an unheated sensor is usually caused by the buildup of soot on the ceramic element, which lengthens its response time and may cause total loss of ability to sense oxygen. For heated sensors, normal deposits are burned off during operation, and failure occurs due to catalyst depletion. The probe then tends to report lean mixture, the ECU enriches the mixture, the exhaust gets rich with carbon monoxide and hydrocarbons, and the fuel economy worsens.

Leaded gasoline contaminates the oxygen sensors and catalytic converters. Most oxygen sensors are rated for some service life in the presence of leaded gasoline, but sensor life will be shortened to as little as 15,000 miles (24,000 km), depending on the lead concentration. Lead-damaged sensors typically have their tips discolored light rusty.

Another common cause of premature failure of lambda probes is contamination of fuel with silicones (used in some sealings and greases) or silicates (used as corrosion inhibitors in some antifreezes). In this case, the deposits on the sensor are colored between shiny white and grainy light gray.

Leaks of oil into the engine may cover the probe tip with an oily black deposit, with associated loss of response.

An overly rich mixture causes buildup of black powdery deposit on the probe. This may be caused by failure of the probe itself, or by a problem elsewhere in the fuel-rationing system.

Applying an external voltage to the zirconia sensors, e.g. by checking them with some types of ohmmeter, may damage them.

Some sensors have an air inlet to the sensor in the lead, so contamination from the lead caused by water or oil leaks can be sucked into the sensor and cause failure.

Symptoms of a failing oxygen sensor includes:

- sensor light on dash indicates problem,
- increased tailpipe emissions,
- increased fuel consumption,
- hesitation on acceleration,
- stalling,
- rough idling.

== Diving applications ==
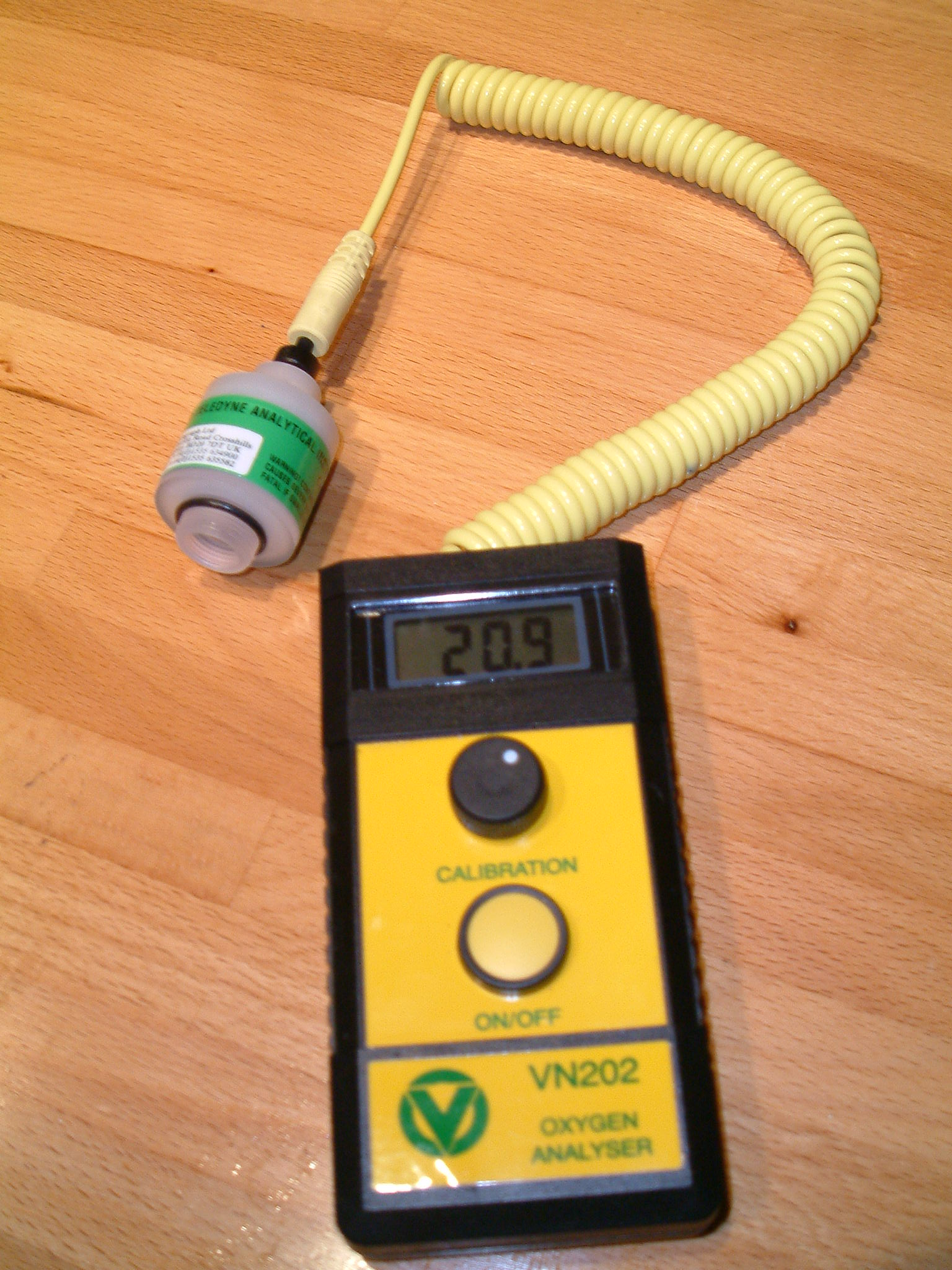
An oxygen analyser for breathing gas mixtures for diving

The type of oxygen sensor used in most underwater diving applications is the electro-galvanic oxygen sensor, a type of fuel cell, which is sometimes called an oxygen analyser or ppO_{2} meter. They are used to measure the oxygen concentration of breathing gas mixes such as nitrox and trimix. They are also used within the oxygen control mechanisms of closed-circuit rebreathers to keep the partial pressure of oxygen within safe limits. and to monitor the oxygen content of the breathing gas in saturation diving systems and of surface supplied mixed gas. This type of sensor operates by measuring the voltage generated by a small electro-galvanic fuel cell.

== Scientific and production applications ==
=== Soil respiration ===
In soil respiration studies oxygen sensors can be used in conjunction with carbon dioxide sensors to help improve the characterization of soil respiration. Typically, soil oxygen sensors use a galvanic cell to produce a current flow that is proportional to the oxygen concentration being measured. These sensors are buried at various depths to monitor oxygen depletion over time, which is then used to predict soil respiration rates. Generally, these soil sensors are equipped with a built-in heater to prevent condensation from forming on the permeable membrane, as relative humidity can reach 100% in soil.

=== Marine biology ===
In marine biology or limnology, oxygen measurements are usually done in order to measure respiration of a community or an organism, but have also been used to measure primary production of algae. The traditional way of measuring oxygen concentration in a water sample has been to use wet chemistry techniques e.g. the Winkler titration method. There are however commercially available oxygen sensors that measure the oxygen concentration in liquids with great accuracy. There are two types of oxygen sensors available: electrodes (electrochemical sensors) and optodes (optical sensors).

=== Brewing ===
In breweries, dissolved oxygen is measured at multiple places within a beer production operation, from DO (dissolved oxygen) control at wort aeration, to measurement with a trace oxygen sensor (low-PPB; low-parts per billion) at the filling line. These measurements are either taken with an in-line dissolved oxygen sensor or a portable dissolved oxygen meter.

=== Pharmaceutical production ===
Oxygen sensors play a critical role in the production of active pharmaceutical ingredients made in a bioreactor by cell culture or fermentation. Because oxygen is important in cellular respiration, the oxygen sensor provides a critical measurement to ensure that cells in the bioreactor are getting the oxygen needed to maximize production. The accuracy of the oxygen sensor is critical, as a lack of oxygen negatively impacts productivity and excess oxygen can lead to changes in cell metabolism. In bioreactors, oxygen sensors can be installed vertically or at an angle. For vertical installations, angled-tip oxygen sensors help to provide accurate readings.

== Oxygen sensor technologies ==
=== Electrodes ===
The Clark-type electrode is the most used oxygen sensor for measuring oxygen dissolved in a liquid. The basic principle is that there is a cathode and an anode submersed in an electrolyte. Oxygen enters the sensor through a permeable membrane by diffusion and is reduced at the cathode, creating a measurable electric current.

There is a linear relationship between the oxygen concentration and the electric current. With a two-point calibration (0% and 100% air saturation), it is possible to measure oxygen in the sample.

One drawback to this approach is that oxygen is consumed during the measurement with a rate equal to the diffusion in the sensor. This means that the sensor must be stirred in order to get the correct measurement and avoid stagnant water. With an increasing sensor size, the oxygen consumption increases and so does the stirring sensitivity. In large sensors there tend to also be a drift in the signal over time due to consumption of the electrolyte. However, Clark-type sensors can be made very small with a tip size of 10 μm. The oxygen consumption of such a microsensor is so small that it is practically insensitive to stirring and can be used in stagnant media such as sediments or inside plant tissue.

=== Optodes ===
An oxygen optode is a sensor based on optical measurement of the oxygen concentration. A chemical film is glued to the tip of an optical cable, and the fluorescence properties of this film depend on the oxygen concentration. Fluorescence is at a maximum when there is no oxygen present. The higher the concentration of oxygen, the shorter the lifetime of the fluorescence. When an O_{2} molecule comes along, it collides with the film, and this quenches the photoluminescence. In a given oxygen concentration, there will be a specific number of O_{2} molecules colliding with the film at any given time, and the fluorescence properties will be stable.

The signal (fluorescence) to oxygen ratio is not linear, and an optode is most sensitive at low oxygen concentration. That is, the sensitivity decreases as oxygen concentration increases, following the Stern–Volmer relationship. The optode sensors can, however, work in the whole region with 0% to 100% oxygen saturation in water, and the calibration is done the same way as with the Clark-type sensor. No oxygen is consumed, and hence the sensor is insensitive to stirring, but the signal will stabilize more quickly if the sensor is stirred after being put in the sample. These types of electrode sensors can be used for in situ and real-time monitoring of oxygen production in water-splitting reactions. The platinized electrodes can accomplish the real-time monitoring of hydrogen production in water-splitting device.

Planar optodes are used to detect the spatial distribution of oxygen concentrations in a platinized foil. Based on the same principle as optode probes, a digital camera is used to capture fluorescence intensities over a specific area.

== See also ==
- Exhaust gas analyzer
- Digifant engine management system
- Jetronic
- Motronic
- Oxygen saturation
- Winkler test for dissolved oxygen
- Pulse oximetry
