= BOD bottle =

Scientific device

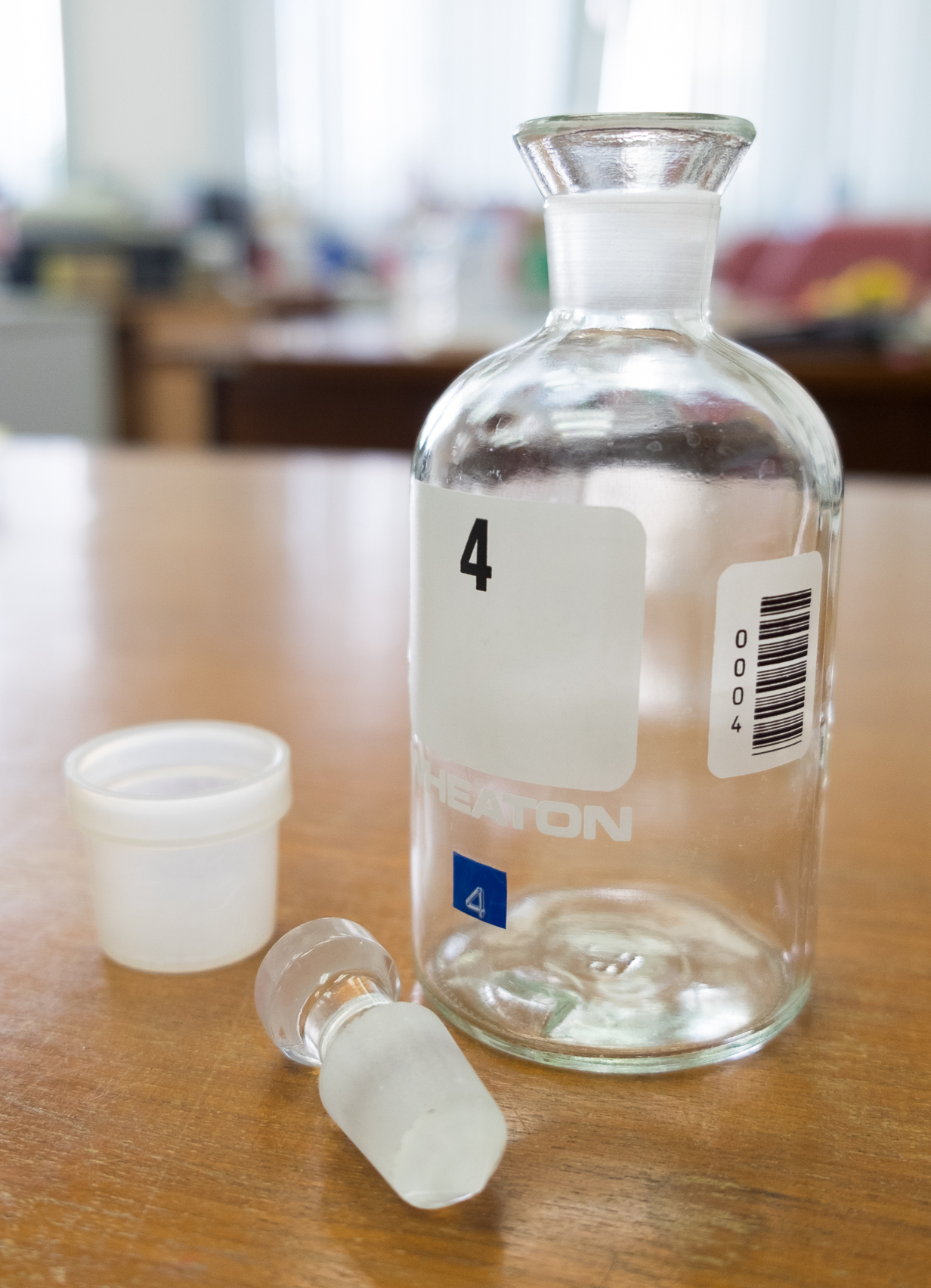
BOD Bottle

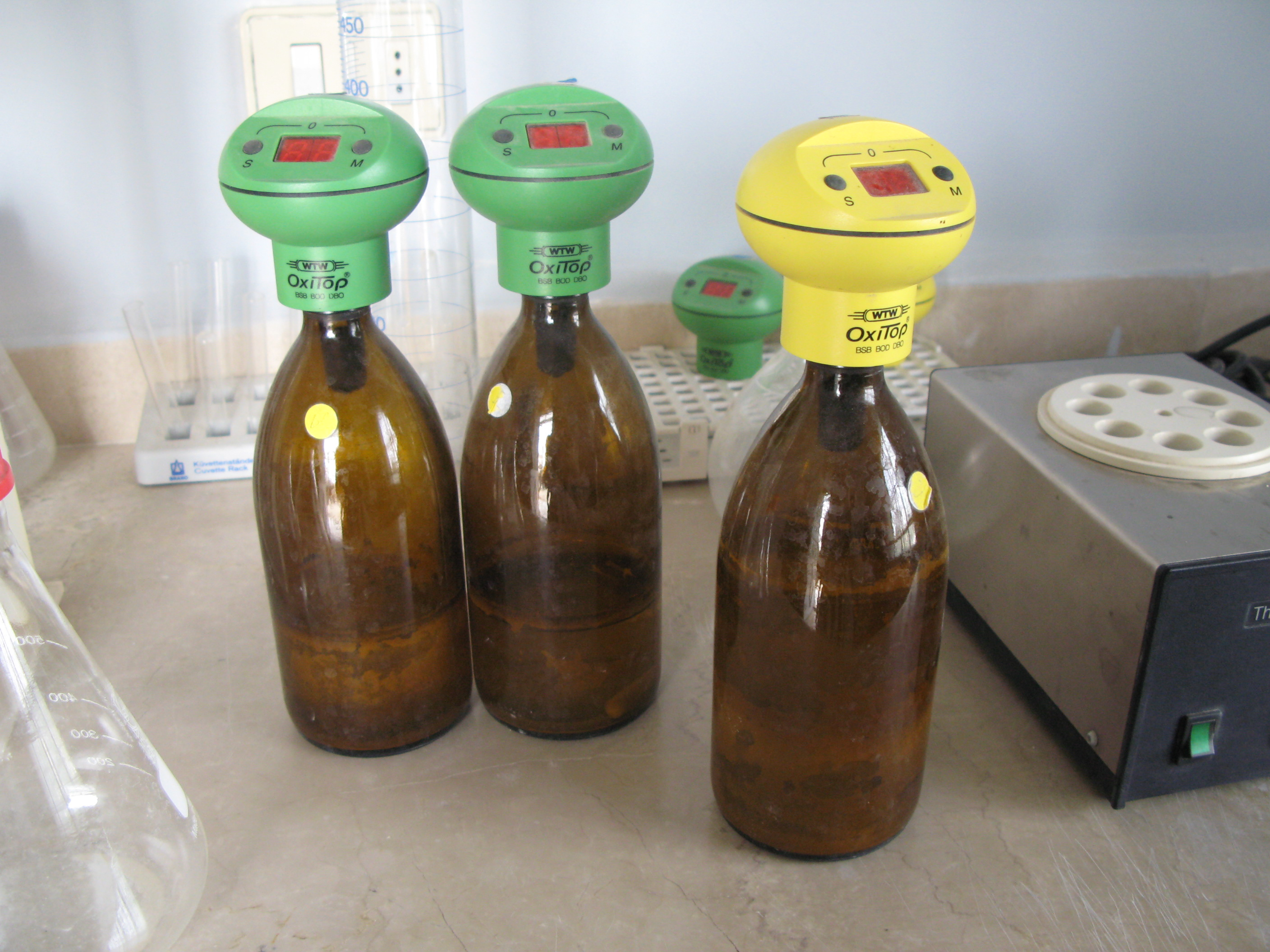
BOD test bottles at the laboratory of a wastewater treatment plant.

BOD Bottle or an incubation bottle is a main apparatus used for the Biological Oxygen Demand (BOD) test. During the five-day BOD or BOD5 test process, the BOD bottle is used for incubating diluted samples under the 20 °C or 68 °F of temperature.

== Structure ==
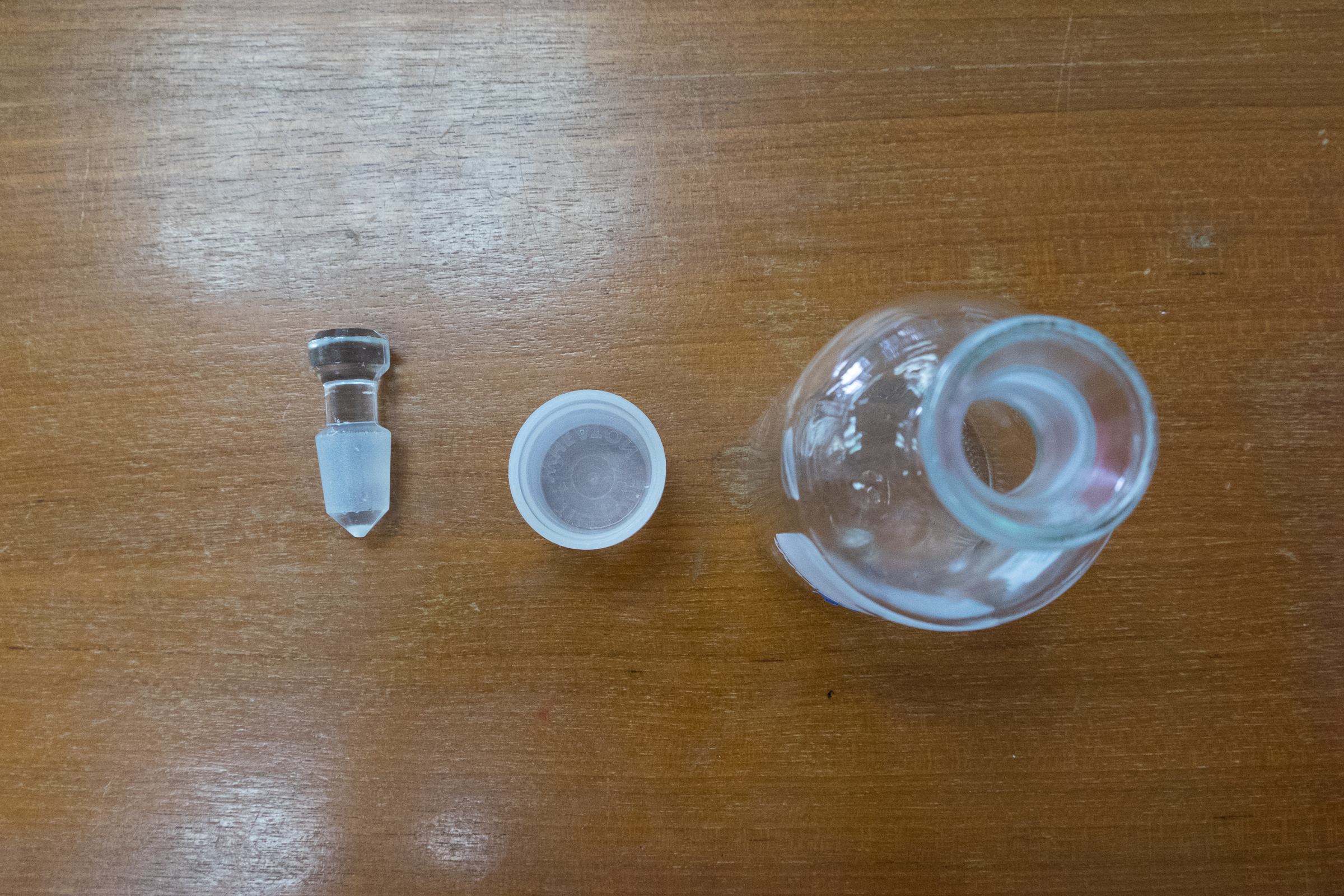
BOD Bottle Bird's-eye view

The bottle is normally designed to have a special shoulder radius to push out all air from the inside of the bottle when a sample solution is being filled. According to Method 5210 in Standard Methods for the Examination of Water and Wastewater, the BOD bottle should include a ground-glass stopper and a flared mouth which form a water seal preventing the air from the outside of the bottle coming in. Method 5210 also recommends to use a paper, a foil or a plastic cup to cap over the mouth of the bottle reducing the evaporation during the incubation. Generally, the side of the BOD bottle is permanently screened with white writing area, and is printed with a specific number; both for the aid of the sample identification.

Stopper

There are two kinds of stopper: the Glass Pennyhead and the Glass Robotic stopper.

Sizes

There are many BOD bottle sizes. The dose of the mixture of the solution (nutrient, mineral and buffer solution) is related to the size of the bottle. For the Standard Methods 5210, the BOD bottle “having 60 mL or greater capacity (300-mL)” is mentioned as one of the apparatus for the BOD test. A 60 mL BOD bottle is available and listed as "often convenient" by EPA (Environmental Protection Agency) Method 405.1. However, EPA Method 405.1 was written in 1974 and is no longer an EPA-approved method per 40CFR Part 136.

== Materials ==
Glass is a material being specified in the Standard Methods 5210 of the BOD5 test. The glass bottles are manufactured from Type 1 borosilicate glass.

A black BOD bottle

A black BOD bottle is coated with PVC plastic that blocks visible light. Black bottles are used in marine photosynthesis projects which needs to compare oxygen levels in light and dark conditions.

Disposable BOD Bottle or Carbonaceous Biochemical Oxygen Demand (CBOD) Bottle

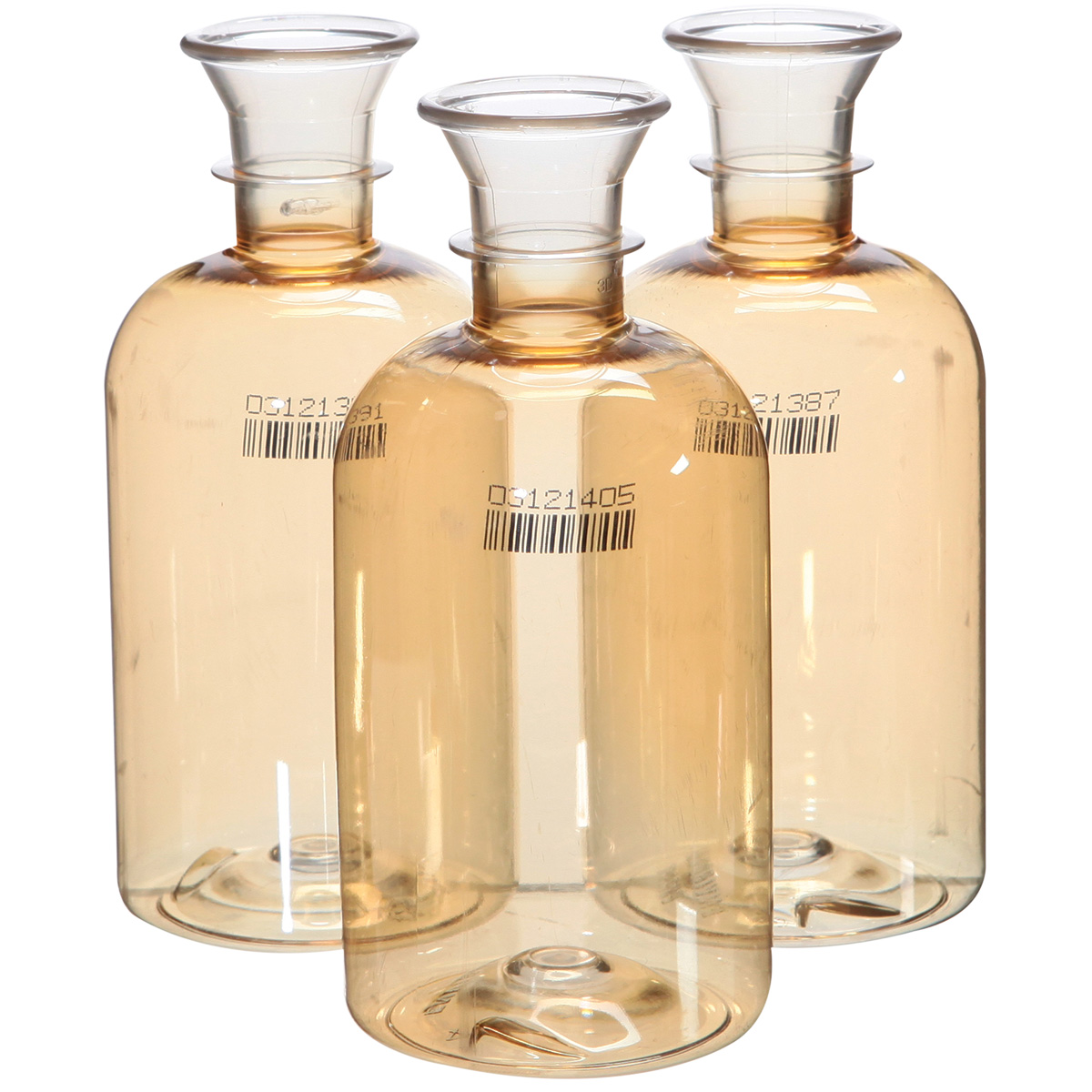
Disposable BOD bottles

It is a carbon-coated polyethylene terephthalate (PET) bottle that is solely manufactured by Environmental Express in Charleston, SC. The bottle is lightweight, unbreakable, and recyclable. Since the bottle is designed for single-use, it eliminates any potential for cross-contamination between samples. The bottle does not require any resources nor energy for cleaning and rinsing as it is disposable. CBOD bottle is also claimed to be cheaper, and cause less contamination in the sample solution than the conventional- BOD bottle.
