= Winkler titration =

Test to determine the concentration of dissolved oxygen in water

The Winkler test is used to determine the concentration of dissolved oxygen in water samples. Dissolved oxygen (DO) is widely used in water quality studies and the routine operation of water reclamation facilities to analyze its level of oxygen saturation.

In the test, an excess of manganese(II) salt, iodide (I^{−}) and hydroxide (OH^{−}) ions are added to a water sample, causing a white precipitate of Mn(OH)_{2} to form. This precipitate is then oxidized by the oxygen that is present in the water sample into a brown manganese-containing precipitate with manganese in a more highly oxidized state (either Mn(III) or Mn(IV)).

In the next step, a strong acid (preferably sulfuric acid) is added to acidify the solution. The brown precipitate then converts the iodide ion (I^{−}) to iodine. The amount of dissolved oxygen is directly proportional to the titration of iodine with a thiosulfate solution. Today, the method is effectively used as its colorimetric modification, where the trivalent manganese produced on acidifying the brown suspension is directly reacted with ethylenediaminetetraacetic acid (EDTA) to give a pink color. As manganese is the only common metal giving a color reaction with EDTA, it has the added effect of masking other metals as colorless complexes.

== History ==
The test was originally developed by Ludwig Wilhelm Winkler, in later literature referred to as Lajos Winkler, while working at Budapest University on his doctoral dissertation in 1888. The amount of dissolved oxygen is a measure of the biological activity of the water masses. Phytoplankton and macroalgae present in the water mass-produce oxygen by photosynthesis. Bacteria and eukaryotic organisms (zooplankton, fish) consume this oxygen through cellular respiration. The result of these two mechanisms determines the concentration of dissolved oxygen, which in turn indicates the rate of biomass production. The difference between the physical concentration of oxygen in the water (or the theoretical concentration if there were no living organisms) and the actual concentration of oxygen is referred to as the biochemical oxygen demand (BOD). The Winkler test is often controversial as it is not 100% accurate, and the oxygen levels may vary from test to test despite using the same constant sample.

== Chemical processes ==
In the first step, manganese(II) sulphate (at 48% of the total volume) is added to an environmental water sample. Next, potassium iodide (15% in potassium hydroxide 70%) is added to produce a pinkish-brown precipitate.

In the alkaline solution, dissolved oxygen oxidize manganese(II) ions to the tetravalent state:

2 Mn^{2+}(aq) + O_{2}(aq) + 4 OH^{−}(aq) → 2 MnO(OH)_{2}(s)

Mn has been oxidised to 4+, and MnO(OH)_{2} appears as a brown precipitate. There is some uncertainty about whether the oxidised manganese is tetravalent or trivalent. Some sources claim that Mn(OH)_{3} is the brown precipitate, but hydrated MnO_{2} may also give the brown colour.

4 Mn(OH)_{2}(s) + O_{2}(aq) + 2 H_{2}O → 4 Mn(OH)_{3}(s)

The second part of the Winkler test acidifies the solution. The precipitate dissolves back into solution as the H^{+} ions react with the O^{2−} and OH^{−} ions to form water:

MnO(OH)_{2}(s) + 4 H^{+}(aq) → Mn^{4+}(aq) + 3 H_{2}O(l)

The acid facilitates the conversion of the iodide ion into elemental iodine by the brown, manganese-containing precipitate.

The Mn^{IV}(SO_{4})_{2} formed by acidification of the solution with sulfuric acid converts the iodide ions into iodine, while Mn(IV) is reduced back to manganese(II) ions in an acidic medium:

Mn^{IV}(SO_{4})_{2} + 2 I^{−}(aq) → Mn^{2+}(aq) + I_{2}(aq) + 2 SO^{2−}_{4}(aq)

Thiosulfate is used, with a starch indicator, to titrate the iodine:

2 S_{2}O^{2−}_{3}(aq) + I_{2} → S_{4}O^{2−}_{6}(aq) + 2 I^{−}(aq)

== Analysis ==
From the above stoichiometric equations, we can find that:

1 mole of O_{2} → 2 moles of MnO(OH)_{2} → 2 mole of I_{2} → 4 mole of S_{2}O^{2−}_{3}

Therefore, after determining the number of moles of iodine produced, one can determine the number of moles of oxygen molecules present in the original water sample. The oxygen content is usually given in milligrams per liter (mg/L).

== Limitations ==
The success of this method is critically dependent upon the manner in which the sample is manipulated. At all stages, steps must be taken to ensure that oxygen is neither introduced to nor lost from the sample. Furthermore, the water sample must be free of any solutes that could oxidize or reduce iodine.

Instrumental methods, based on oxygen sensors (fuel cell battery reducing O_{2} at their cathode), have supplanted the routine use of the Winkler test. However, the test is still used to verify instrument calibration.

== BOD_{5} ==
To determine five-day biochemical oxygen demand (BOD_{5}), several dilutions of a sample are analyzed for dissolved oxygen before and after a five-day incubation period at 20 °C in the dark. In some cases, bacteria are used to provide a standardized community to uptake oxygen while consuming the organic matter in the sample; these bacteria are known as "seed". The difference in DO and the dilution factor are used to calculate BOD_{5}. The resulting number (usually reported in parts per million or milligrams per liter) helps determine the relative organic strength of sewage or other polluted waters.

The BOD_{5} test is an example of an analysis that determines classes of materials in a sample.

== Winkler bottle ==
A Winkler bottle is a piece of laboratory glassware specifically made for carrying out the Winkler test. These bottles feature conical tops and a close-fitting stopper, designed to exclude air bubbles when the top is sealed. This is important because oxygen in trapped air would be included in the measurement and would affect the test accuracy.

== See also ==
- Clark electrode – Electrode measuring the oxygen partial pressure in a solution
- Oxygen sensor – Device for measuring oxygen concentration
