= Lajos Winkler =

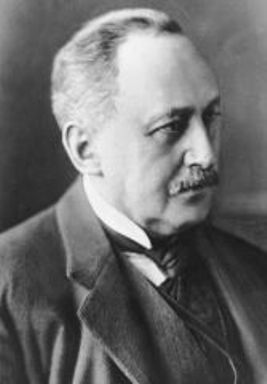
- Lajos Winkler
- Born: May 21, 1863
- Died: April 14, 1939 (aged 75)
- Education: University of Budapest
- Scientific career
- Doctoral advisor: Carl von Than

Lajos Winkler (May 21, 1863 – April 14, 1939) was a Hungarian analytical chemist. He is best known today for his discovery of the Winkler method for the measurement of oxygen dissolved in water.

== Life ==
Relatively little is in print in English concerning the life of Lajos Winkler. Winkler studied science at the Budapest University of Science, receiving his doctorate there in 1890, while working with Carl von Than. He stayed on to work as a lecturer, among other positions, and directed the Institute of Chemistry, starting in 1909, for more than 25 years. He is said to have published several hundred papers, to have helped found the Hungarian Journal of Chemistry, and to have been a member of the Hungarian Academy of Sciences. See also the study of Vamos for more information and references.

== Dissolved oxygen ==
Natural water contains molecular oxygen (O_{2}), necessary for life in ponds, rivers, and so on. A common nineteenth-century test for determining dissolved oxygen, as described by Alfred Wanklyn, involved boiling the water sample and collecting, over mercury, the gases released, for subsequent analysis.

In 1888, while still a doctoral student, Lajos Winkler discovered a much safer, and more precise, method of dissolved-oxygen analysis, which is still widely used today. The Winkler method uses the dissolved oxygen to convert manganese(II) hydroxide into manganese(III) species, and then analyzing for the latter by titration.

== See also ==
- Winkler bottle
