= Wastewater quality indicators =

Ways to test the suitability of wastewater

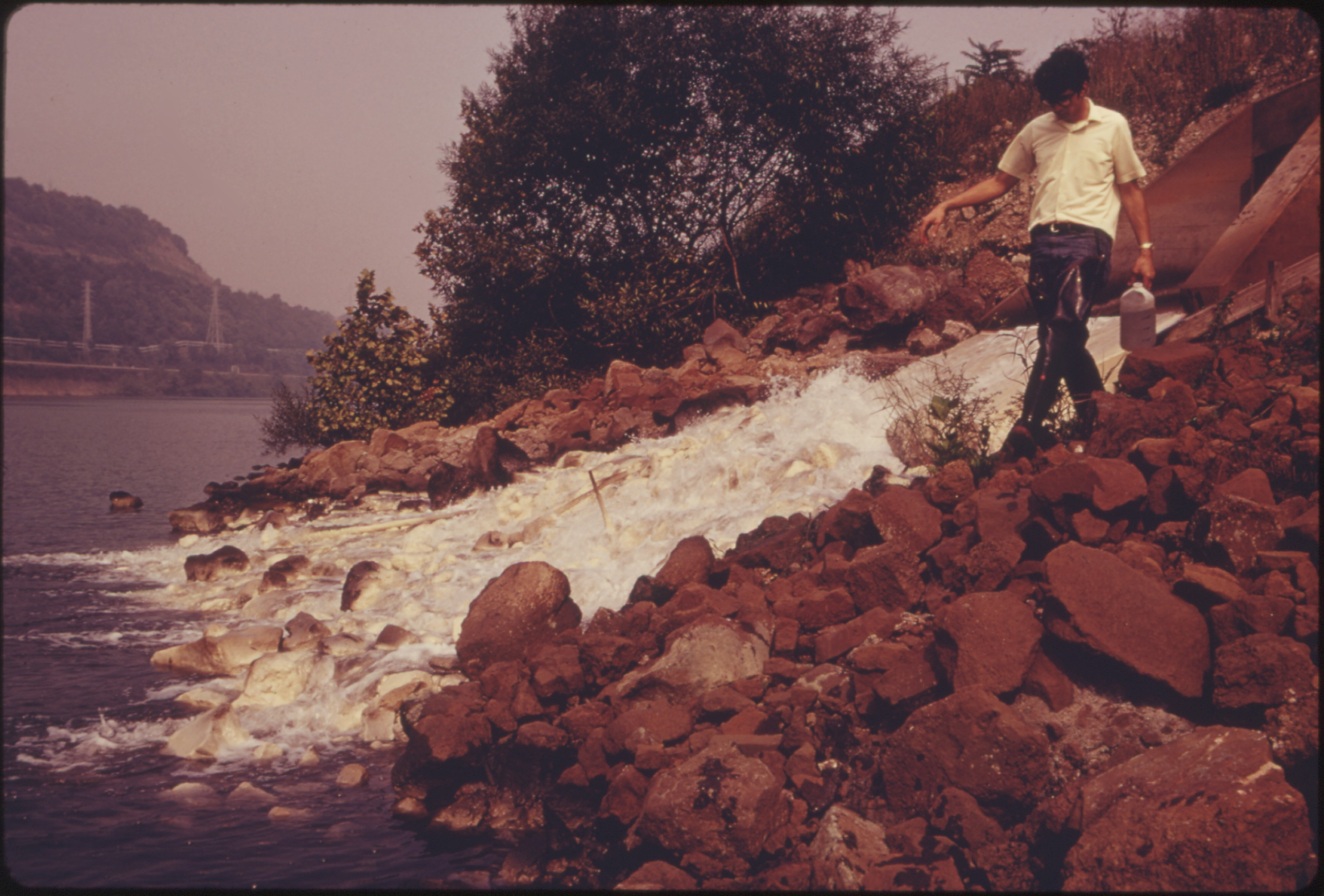
Tests will determine the quality of this wastewater.

Wastewater quality indicators are laboratory test methodologies to assess suitability of wastewater for disposal, treatment or reuse. The main parameters in sewage that are measured to assess the sewage strength or quality as well as treatment options include: solids, indicators of organic matter, nitrogen, phosphorus, indicators of fecal contamination. Tests selected vary with the intended use or discharge location. Tests can measure physical, chemical, and biological characteristics of the wastewater. Physical characteristics include temperature and solids. Chemical characteristics include pH value, dissolved oxygen concentrations, biochemical oxygen demand (BOD) and chemical oxygen demand (COD), nitrogen, phosphorus, chlorine. Biological characteristics are determined with bioassays and aquatic toxicology tests.

Both the BOD and COD tests are a measure of the relative oxygen-depletion effect of a waste contaminant. Both have been widely adopted as a measure of pollution effect. Any oxidizable material present in an aerobic natural waterway or in an industrial wastewater will be oxidized both by biochemical (bacterial) or chemical processes. The result is that the oxygen content of the water will be decreased.

== Physical characteristics ==
=== Temperature ===
Aquatic organisms cannot survive outside of specific temperature ranges. Irrigation runoff and water cooling of power stations may elevate temperatures above the acceptable range for some species. Elevated temperature can also cause an algae bloom which reduces oxygen levels. (See thermal pollution.) Temperature may be measured with a calibrated thermometer.

=== Solids ===
Solid material in wastewater may be dissolved, suspended, or settled. Total dissolved solids or TDS (sometimes called filterable residue) is measured as the mass of residue remaining when a measured volume of filtered water is evaporated. The mass of dried solids remaining on the filter is called total suspended solids (TSS) or nonfilterable residue. Settleable solids are measured as the visible volume accumulated at the bottom of an Imhoff cone after water has settled for one hour. Turbidity is a measure of the light scattering ability of suspended matter in the water. Salinity measures water density or conductivity changes caused by dissolved materials.

== Chemical characteristics ==
Virtually any chemical may be found in water, but routine testing is commonly limited to a few chemical elements of unique significance.

=== pH value ===
Water ionizes into hydronium (H_{3}O^{+}) cations and hydroxyl (OH^{−}) anions. The concentration of ionized hydrogen (as protonated water) is expressed as pH.

=== Oxygen and oxygen demand ===
==== Dissolved oxygen concentrations ====
Most aquatic habitats are occupied by fish or other animals requiring certain minimum dissolved oxygen concentrations to survive. Dissolved oxygen concentrations may be measured directly in wastewater, but the amount of oxygen potentially required by other chemicals in the wastewater is termed as oxygen demand. Dissolved or suspended oxidizable organic material in wastewater will be used as a food source. Finely divided material is readily available to microorganisms whose populations will increase to digest the amount of food available. Digestion of this food requires oxygen, so the oxygen content of the water will ultimately be decreased by the amount required to digest the dissolved or suspended food. Oxygen concentrations may fall below the minimum required by aquatic animals if the rate of oxygen utilization exceeds replacement by atmospheric oxygen.

Basically, the reaction for biochemical oxidation may be written as:

Oxidizable material + bacteria + nutrient + O_{2} → CO_{2} + H_{2}O + oxidized inorganics such as NO^{−}_{3} or SO^{2−}_{4}

Oxygen consumption by reducing chemicals such as sulfides and nitrites is typified as follows:

S^{2−} + 2 O_{2} → SO^{2−}_{4}

NO^{−}_{2} + 1/2 O_{2} → NO^{−}_{3}

==== Biochemical oxygen demand and chemical oxygen demand ====
Since all natural waterways contain bacteria and nutrient, almost any waste compounds introduced into such waterways will initiate biochemical reactions (such as shown above). Those biochemical reactions create what is measured in the laboratory as the BOD.

Oxidizable chemicals (such as reducing chemicals) introduced into a natural water will similarly initiate chemical reactions (such as shown above). Those chemical reactions create what is measured in the laboratory as COD.

Both the BOD and COD tests are a measure of the relative oxygen-depletion effect of a waste contaminant. Both have been widely adopted as a measure of pollution effect. The BOD test measures the oxygen demand of biodegradable pollutants whereas the COD test measures the oxygen demand of oxidizable pollutants.

The so-called 5-day BOD measures the amount of oxygen consumed by biochemical oxidation of waste contaminants in a 5-day period. The total amount of oxygen consumed when the biochemical reaction is allowed to proceed to completion is called the "Ultimate BOD". Because the Ultimate BOD is so time consuming, the 5-day BOD has been almost universally adopted as a measure of relative pollution effect.

There are also many different COD tests of which the 4-hour COD is probably the most common.

There is no generalized correlation between the 5-day BOD and the ultimate BOD. Similarly there is no generalized correlation between BOD and COD. It is possible to develop such correlations for specific waste contaminants in a specific wastewater stream but such correlations cannot be generalized for use with any other waste contaminants or wastewater streams. This is because the composition of any wastewater stream is different. As an example an effluent consisting of a solution of simple sugars that might discharge from a confectionery factory is likely to have organic components that degrade very quickly. In such a case, the 5 day BOD and the ultimate BOD would be very similar since there would be very little organic material left after 5 days. However a final effluent of a sewage treatment works serving a large industrialised area might have a discharge where the ultimate BOD was much greater than the 5 day BOD because much of the easily degraded material would have been removed in the sewage treatment process and many industrial processes discharge difficult to degrade organic molecules.

The laboratory test procedures for the determining the above oxygen demands are detailed in many standard texts. American versions include Standard Methods for the Examination of Water and Wastewater.

Any oxidizable material present in an aerobic natural waterway or in an industrial wastewater will be oxidized both by biochemical (bacterial) or chemical processes. The result is that the oxygen content of the water will be decreased.

=== Nitrogen ===
Nitrogen is an important nutrient for plant and animal growth. Atmospheric nitrogen is less biologically available than dissolved nitrogen in the form of ammonia and nitrates. Availability of dissolved nitrogen may contribute to algal blooms. Ammonia and organic forms of nitrogen are often measured as Total Kjeldahl Nitrogen, and analysis for inorganic forms of nitrogen may be performed for more accurate estimates of total nitrogen content.

=== Phosphorus ===
Total phosphorus and phosphate, PO^{3−}_{4}

Phosphates enter surface waters through both nonpoint sources and point sources. Nonpoint source (NPS) pollution refers to water pollution from diffuse sources. Nonpoint source pollution can be contrasted with point source pollution, where discharges occur to a body of water at a single location. The nonpoint sources of phosphates include natural decomposition of rocks and minerals, stormwater runoff, agricultural pollution, erosion and sedimentation, atmospheric deposition, and direct input by animals/wildlife. Point sources of phosphorus may include municipal sewage treatment plants and industrial dischargers. In general, the nonpoint source pollution typically is significantly higher than the point sources of pollution. Therefore, the key to sound management is to limit the input from both point and nonpoint sources of phosphate. High concentration of phosphate in water bodies is an indication of pollution and largely responsible for eutrophication.

Phosphates are not toxic to people or animals unless they are present in very high levels. Digestive problems could occur from extremely high levels of phosphate.

The following criteria for total phosphorus were recommended by the U.S. Environmental Protection Agency.

1. No more than 0.1 mg/L for streams which do not empty into reservoirs,
2. No more than 0.05 mg/L for streams discharging into reservoirs, and
3. No more than 0.025 mg/L for reservoirs.

Phosphorus is normally low (< 1 mg/L) in clean potable water sources and usually not regulated;

=== Chlorine ===
Chlorine has been widely used for bleaching, as a disinfectant, and for biofouling prevention in water cooling systems. Remaining concentrations of oxidizing hypochlorous acid and hypochlorite ions may be measured as chlorine residual to estimate effectiveness of disinfection or to demonstrate safety for discharge to aquatic ecosystems.

== Biological characteristics ==
Water may be tested by a bioassay comparing survival of an aquatic test species in the wastewater in comparison to water from some other source. Water may also be evaluated to determine the approximate biological population of the wastewater. Pathogenic micro-organisms using water as a means of moving from one host to another may be present in sewage. Coliform index measures the population of an organism commonly found in the intestines of warm-blooded animals as an indicator of the possible presence of other intestinal pathogens.

Aquatic toxicology tests are used to provide qualitative and quantitative data on adverse effects on aquatic organisms from a toxicant. Testing types include acute (short-term exposure), chronic (life span) and bioaccumulation tests. Many industrial facilities in the US conduct "whole effluent toxicity" (WET) tests on their wastewater discharges, typically in combination with chemical tests for selected pollutants.

== See also ==
- Carbonaceous biochemical oxygen demand
- Conventional pollutant
- Hypoxia (environmental)
- Water pollution
- Water quality
