= Theoretical oxygen demand =

Theoretical oxygen demand (ThOD) is the calculated amount of oxygen required to oxidize a compound to its final oxidation products. However, there are some differences between standard methods that can influence the results obtained: for example, some calculations assume that nitrogen released from organic compounds is generated as ammonia, whereas others allow for ammonia oxidation to nitrate. Therefore, in expressing results, the calculation assumptions should always be stated.

In order to determine the ThOD for glycine (CH_{2}(NH_{2})COOH) using the following assumptions:

1. In the first step, the organic carbon and nitrogen are converted to carbon dioxide (CO_{2}) and ammonia (NH_{3}), respectively.
2. In the second and third steps, the ammonia is oxidized sequentially to nitrite and nitrate.
3. The ThOD is the sum of the oxygen required for all three steps.

We can calculate by following steps:

1. Write balanced reaction for the carbonaceous oxygen demand.
  CH_{2}(NH_{2})COOH + 1.5O_{2} → NH_{3} + 2CO_{2} + H_{2}O
2. Write balanced reactions for the nitrogenous oxygen demand.
  NH_{3} + 1.5O_{2} → HNO_{2} + H_{2}O
  HNO_{2} + 0.5O_{2} → HNO_{3}
  NH_{3} + 2O_{2} → HNO_{3} + H_{2}O
3. Determine the ThOD.
  ThOD = (1.5 + 2) mol O_{2}/mol glycine
  = 3.5 mol O_{2}/mol glycine × 32 g/mol O_{2} / 75 g/mol glycine
  = 1.49 g O_{2}/g glycine

The theoretical oxygen demand represents the worst-case scenario. The actual oxygen demand of any compound depends on the biodegradability of the compound and the specific organism metabolizing the compound. The actual oxygen demand can be measured experimentally and is called the biochemical oxygen demand (BOD).

== See also ==
- Biological oxygen demand
- Chemical oxygen demand
- Carbonaceous biochemical oxygen demand
