= Biochemical oxygen demand =

Oxygen needed to remove organics from water

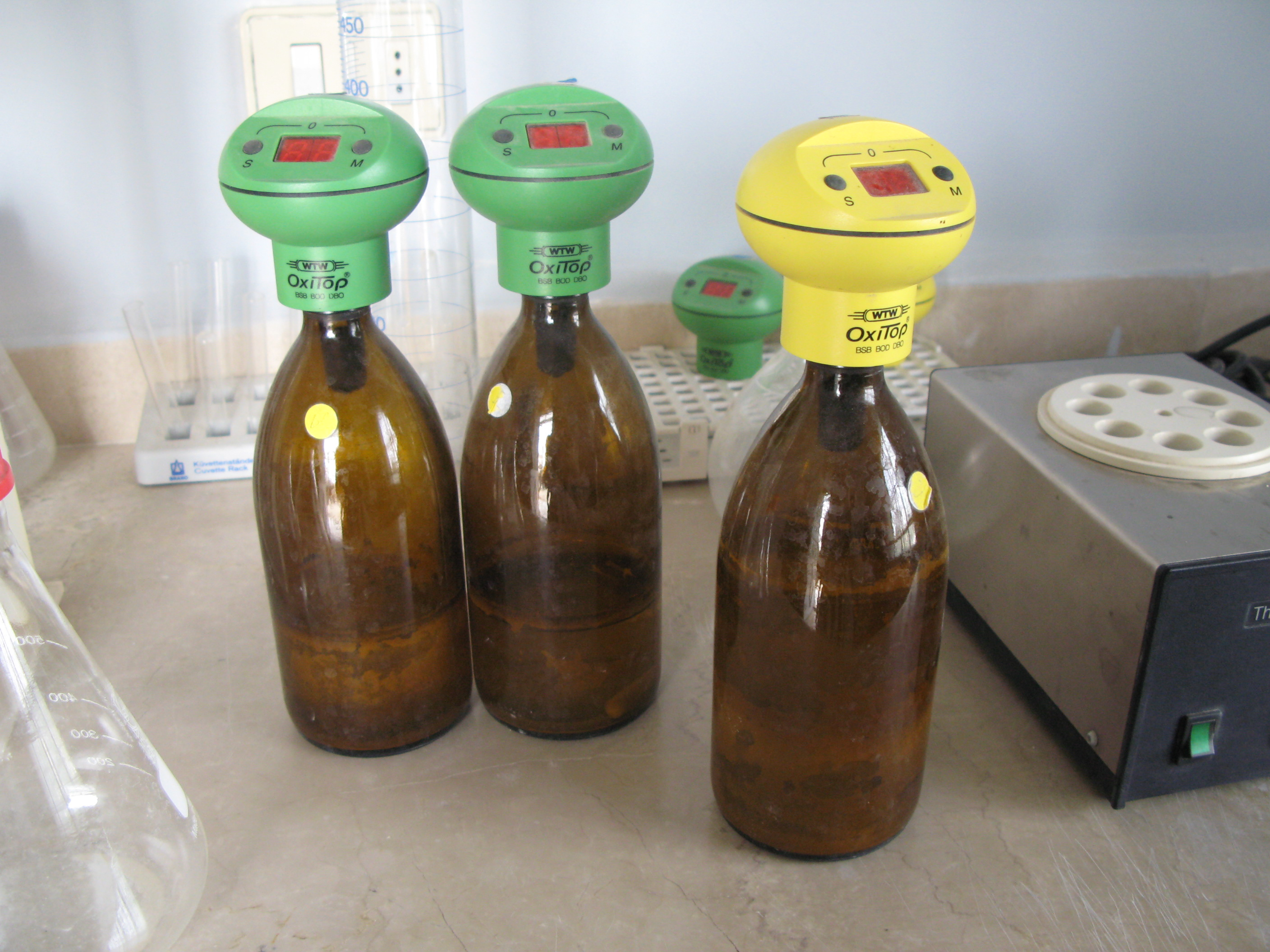
BOD test bottles at the laboratory of a wastewater treatment plant

Biochemical oxygen demand (also known as BOD or biological oxygen demand) is an analytical parameter representing the amount of dissolved oxygen (DO) consumed by aerobic bacteria growing on the organic material present in a water sample at a specific temperature over a specific time period. The BOD value is most commonly expressed in milligrams of oxygen consumed per liter of sample during 5 days of incubation at 20 °C and is often used as a surrogate of the degree of organic water pollution.

Biochemical oxygen demand reduction is used as a gauge of the effectiveness of wastewater treatment plants. BOD of wastewater effluents is used to indicate the short-term impact on the oxygen levels of the receiving water.

BOD analysis is similar in function to chemical oxygen demand (COD) analysis, in that both measure the amount of organic compounds in water. However, COD analysis is less specific, since it measures everything that can be chemically oxidized, rather than just levels of biologically oxidized organic matter.

== Background ==
Most natural waters contain small quantities of organic compounds. Aquatic microorganisms have evolved to use some of these compounds as food. Microorganisms living in oxygenated waters use dissolved oxygen to oxidatively degrade the organic compounds, releasing energy which is used for growth and reproduction. Populations of these microorganisms tend to increase in proportion to the amount of food available. This microbial metabolism creates an oxygen demand proportional to the amount of organic compounds useful as food. Under some circumstances, microbial metabolism can consume dissolved oxygen faster than atmospheric oxygen can dissolve into the water or the autotrophic community (algae, cyanobacteria and macrophytes) can produce. Fish and aquatic insects may die when oxygen is depleted by microbial metabolism.

Biochemical oxygen demand is the amount of oxygen required for microbial metabolism of organic compounds in water. This demand occurs over some variable period of time depending on temperature, nutrient concentrations, and the enzymes available to indigenous microbial populations. The amount of oxygen required to completely oxidize the organic compounds to carbon dioxide and water through generations of microbial growth, death, decay, and cannibalism is total biochemical oxygen demand (total BOD). Total BOD is of more significance to food webs than to water quality. Dissolved oxygen depletion is most likely to become evident during the initial aquatic microbial population explosion in response to a large amount of organic material. If the microbial population deoxygenates the water, however, that lack of oxygen imposes a limit on population growth of aerobic aquatic microbial organisms resulting in a longer term food surplus and oxygen deficit.

A standard temperature at which BOD testing should be carried out was first proposed by the Royal Commission on Sewage Disposal in its eighth report in 1912:

(c) An effluent in order to comply with the general standard must not contain as discharged more than 3 parts per 100,000 of suspended matter, and with its suspended matters included must not take up at 65 °F (18.3 °C) more than 2.0 parts per 100,000 of dissolved oxygen in 5 days. This general standard should be prescribed either by Statute or by order of the Central Authority, and should be subject to modifications by that Authority after an interval of not less than ten years.

This was later standardized at 68 °F and then 20 °C. This temperature may be significantly different from the temperature of the natural environment of the water being tested.

Although the Royal Commission on Sewage Disposal proposed 5 days as an adequate test period for rivers of the United Kingdom of Great Britain and Ireland, longer periods were investigated for North American rivers. Incubation periods of 1, 2, 5, 10 and 20 days were being used into the mid-20th century. Keeping dissolved oxygen available at their chosen temperature, investigators found up to 99 percent of total BOD was exerted within 20 days, 90 percent within 10 days, and approximately 68 percent within 5 days. Variable microbial population shifts to nitrifying bacteria limit test reproducibility for periods greater than 5 days. The 5-day test protocol with acceptably reproducible results emphasizing carbonaceous BOD has been endorsed by the United States Environmental Protection Agency (EPA). This 5-day BOD test result may be described as the amount of oxygen required for aquatic microorganisms to stabilize decomposable organic matter under aerobic conditions. Stabilization, in this context, may be perceived in general terms as the conversion of food to living aquatic fauna. Although these fauna will continue to exert biochemical oxygen demand as they die, that tends to occur within a more stable evolved ecosystem including higher trophic levels.

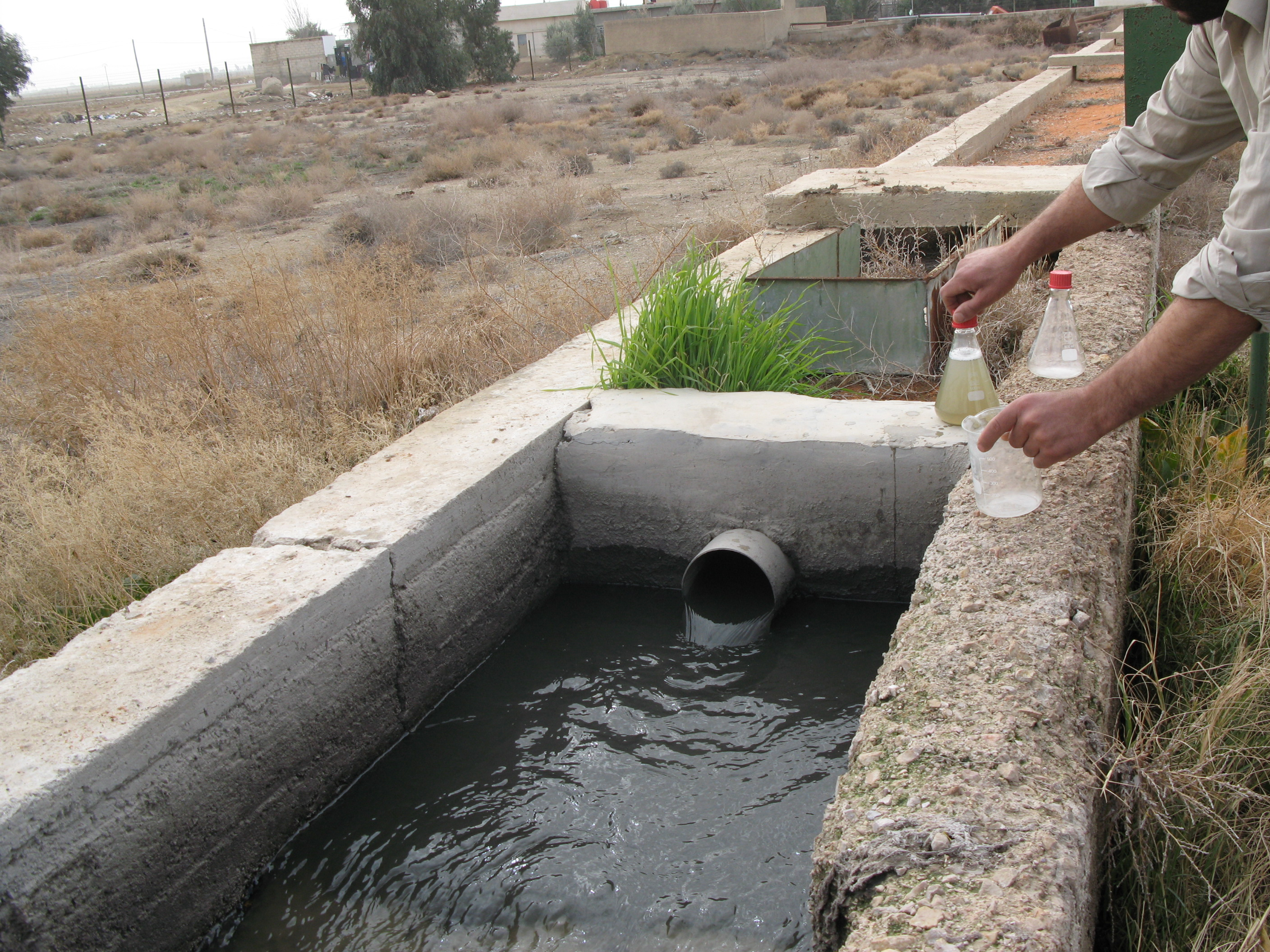
Taking samples from the influent raw wastewater stream for BOD measurements at a wastewater treatment plant in Haran-Al-Awamied near Damascus in Syria

== History ==
The Royal Commission on River Pollution, established in 1865, and the formation of the Royal Commission on Sewage Disposal in 1898 led to the selection in 1908 of BOD_{5} as the definitive test for organic pollution of rivers. Five days was chosen as an appropriate test period because this is supposedly the longest time that river water takes to travel from source to estuary in the U.K. In its sixth report the Royal Commission recommended that the standard set should be 15 parts by weight per million of water. However, in the Ninth report the commission had revised the recommended standard:

An effluent taking up 2–0 parts dissolved oxygen per 100,000 would be found by a simple calculation to require dilution with at least 8 volumes of river water taking up 0.2 part if the resulting mixture was not to take up more than 0.4 part. Our experience indicated that in a large majority of cases the volume of river water would exceed 8 times the volume of effluent, and that the figure of 2–0 parts dissolved oxygen per 100,000, which had been shown to be practicable, would be a safe figure to adopt for the purposes of a general standard, taken in conjunction with the condition that the effluent should not contain more than 3–0 parts per 100,000 of suspended solids.

This was the cornerstone 20:30 (BOD:Suspended Solids) + full nitrification standard which was used as a yardstick in the U.K. up to the 1970s for sewage works effluent quality.

The United States includes BOD effluent limitations in its secondary treatment regulations. Secondary sewage treatment is generally expected to remove 85 percent of the BOD measured in sewage and produce effluent BOD concentrations with a 30-day average of less than 30 mg/L and a 7-day average of less than 45 mg/L. The regulations also describe "treatment equivalent to secondary treatment" as removing 65 percent of the BOD and producing effluent BOD concentrations with a 30-day average less than 45 mg/L and a 7-day average less than 65 mg/L.

=== Typical values ===
Most pristine rivers will have a 5-day carbonaceous BOD below 1 mg/L. Moderately polluted rivers may have a BOD value in the range of 2 to 8 mg/L. Rivers may be considered severely polluted when BOD values exceed 8 mg/L. Municipal sewage that is efficiently treated by a three-stage process would have a value of about 20 mg/L or less. Untreated sewage varies, but averages around 600 mg/L in Europe and as low as 200 mg/L in the U.S., or where there is severe groundwater or surface water infiltration/inflow. The generally lower values in the U.S. derive from the much greater water use per capita than in other parts of the world.

== Use in sewage treatment ==
The BOD is used in measuring waste loadings to treatment plants and in evaluating the BOD-removal efficiency of such treatment systems.

== Methods ==
Winkler published the methodology of a simple, accurate and direct dissolved oxygen analytical procedure in 1888. Since that time, the analysis of dissolved oxygen levels for water has been key to the determination of surface water. The Winkler method is still one of only two analytical techniques used to calibrate oxygen electrode meters; the other procedure is based on oxygen solubility at saturation as per Henry's law.

There are two recognized methods for the measurement of dissolved oxygen for BOD and a number of other methods not currently internationally recognised as standard methods

=== Dilution method ===
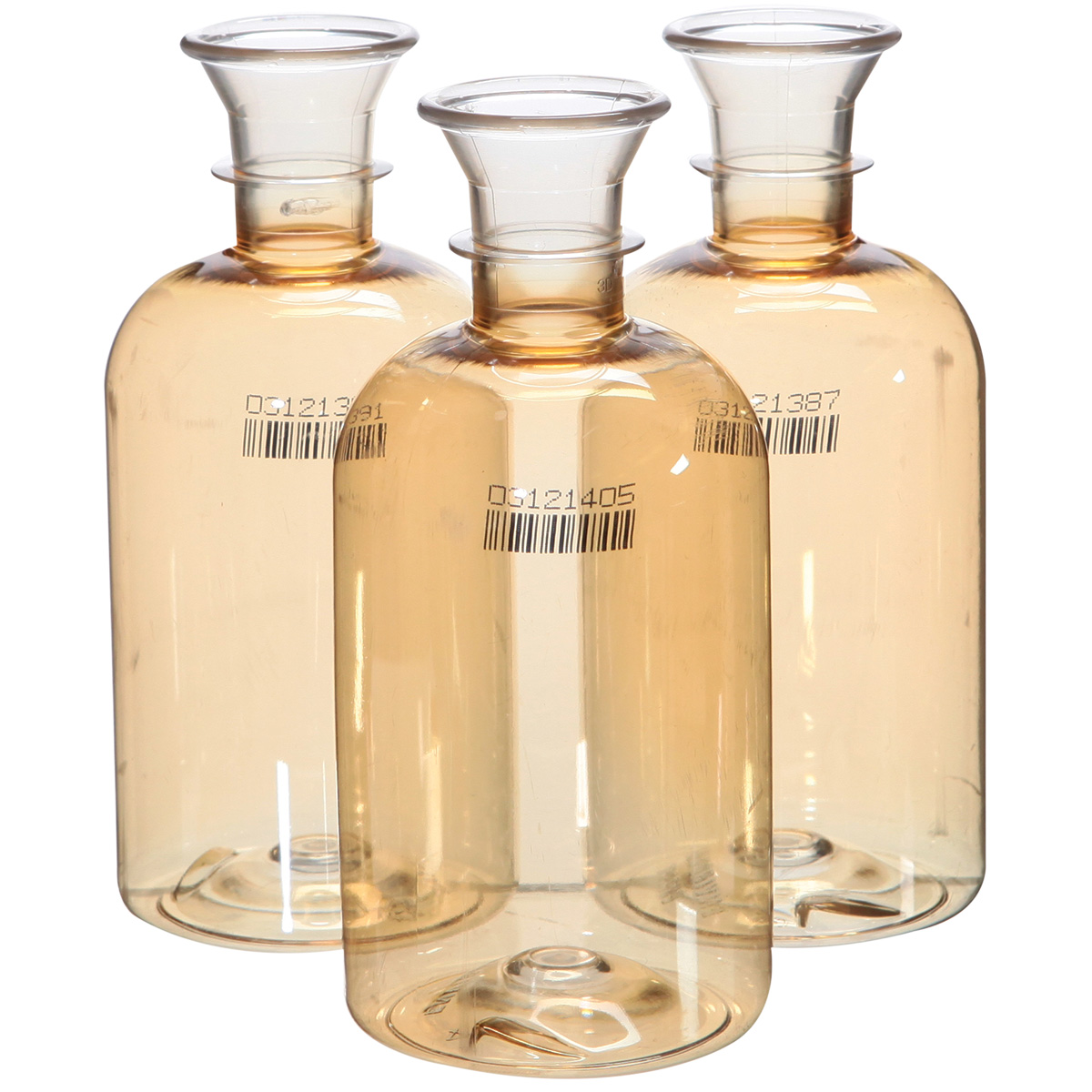
Disposable BOD bottle

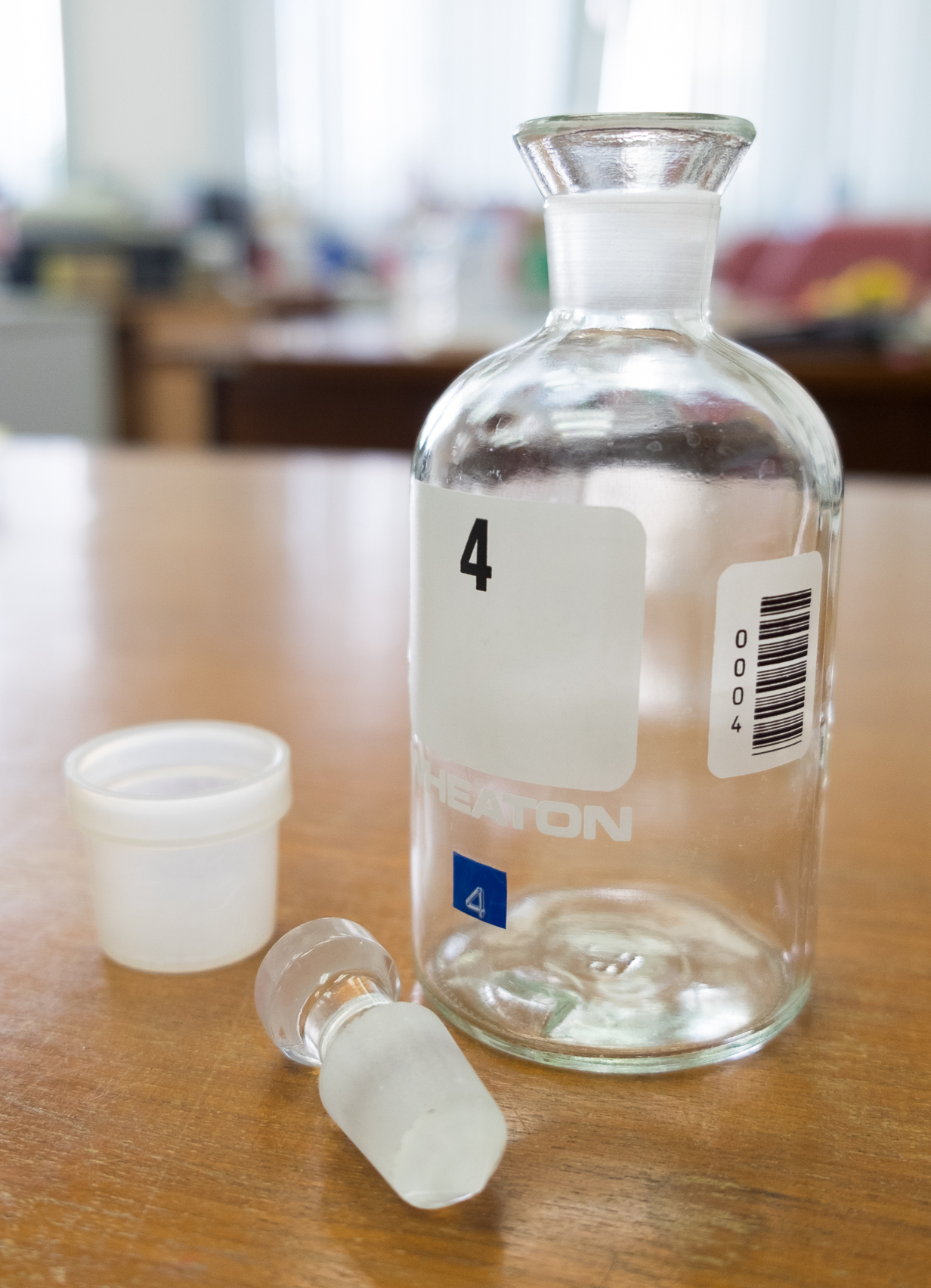
Glass BOD bottle

This standard method is recognized by EPA, which is labeled Method 5210B in the Standard Methods for the Examination of Water and Wastewater. In order to obtain BOD_{5}, dissolved oxygen (DO) concentrations in a sample must be measured before and after the incubation period, and appropriately adjusted by the sample corresponding dilution factor. This analysis is performed using 300 mL incubation bottles in which buffered dilution water is dosed with seed microorganisms and stored for 5 days in the dark room at 20 °C to prevent DO production via photosynthesis. The bottles have traditionally been made of glass, which required cleaning and rinsing between samples. A SM 5210B approved, disposable, plastic BOD bottle is available which eliminates this step. In addition to the various dilutions of BOD samples, this procedure requires dilution water blanks, glucose glutamic acid (GGA) controls, and seed controls. The dilution water blank is used to confirm the quality of the dilution water that is used to dilute the other samples. This is necessary because impurities in the dilution water may cause significant alterations in the results. The GGA control is a standardized solution to determine the quality of the seed, where its recommended BOD_{5} concentration is 198 mg/L ± 30.5 mg/L. For measurement of carbonaceous BOD (cBOD), a nitrification inhibitor is added after the dilution water has been added to the sample. The inhibitor hinders the oxidation of ammonia nitrogen, which supplies the nitrogenous BOD (nBOD). When performing the BOD_{5} test, it is conventional practice to measure only cBOD because nitrogenous demand does not reflect the oxygen demand from organic matter. This is because nBOD is generated by the breakdown of proteins, whereas cBOD is produced by the breakdown of organic molecules.

BOD_{5} is calculated by:

- Unseeded :$\mathrm{BOD}_5 = \frac{(D_0 - D_5)}{P}$
- Seeded: $\mathrm{BOD}_5 = \frac{(D_0 - D_5) - (B_0 - B_5)f}{P}$

where:

$D_0$ is the dissolved oxygen (DO) of the diluted solution after preparation (mg/L)
$D_5$ is the DO of the diluted solution after 5 day incubation (mg/L)
$P$ is the decimal dilution factor
$B_0$ is the DO of diluted seed sample after preparation (mg/L)
$B_5$ is the DO of diluted seed sample after 5 day incubation (mg/L)
$f$ is the ratio of seed volume in dilution solution to seed volume in BOD test on seed

=== Manometric method ===
This method is limited to the measurement of the oxygen consumption due only to carbonaceous oxidation. Ammonia oxidation is inhibited.

The sample is kept in a sealed container fitted with a pressure sensor. A substance that absorbs carbon dioxide (typically lithium hydroxide) is added in the container above the sample level. The sample is stored in conditions identical to the dilution method. Oxygen is consumed and, as ammonia oxidation is inhibited, carbon dioxide is released. The total amount of gas, and thus the pressure, decreases because carbon dioxide is absorbed. From the drop of pressure, the sensor electronics computes and displays the consumed quantity of oxygen.

The main advantages of this method compared to the dilution method are:

- simplicity: no dilution of sample required, no seeding, no blank sample.
- direct reading of BOD value.
- continuous display of BOD value at the current incubation time.

== Alternative methods ==
=== Biosensor ===
An alternative to measure BOD is the development of biosensors, which are devices for the detection of an analyte that combines a biological component with a physicochemical detector component. Enzymes are the most widely used biological sensing elements in the fabrication of biosensors. Their application in biosensor construction is limited by the tedious, time-consuming and costly enzyme purification methods. Microorganisms provide an ideal alternative to these bottlenecks.

Many micro organisms useful for BOD assessment are relatively easy to maintain in pure cultures, grow and harvest at low cost. Moreover, the use of microbes in the field of biosensors has opened up new possibilities and advantages such as ease of handling, preparation and low cost of device. A number of pure cultures, e.g. Trichosporon cutaneum, Bacillus cereus, Klebsiella oxytoca, Pseudomonas sp. etc. individually, have been used by many workers for the construction of BOD biosensor. On the other hand, many workers have immobilized activated sludge, or a mixture of two or three bacterial species and on various membranes for the construction of BOD biosensor. The most commonly used membranes were polyvinyl alcohol, porous hydrophilic membranes etc.

A defined microbial consortium can be formed by conducting a systematic study, i.e. pre-testing of selected micro-organisms for use as a seeding material in BOD analysis of a wide variety of industrial effluents. Such a formulated consortium can be immobilized on suitable membrane, i.e. charged nylon membrane. Charged nylon membrane is suitable for microbial immobilization, due to the specific binding between negatively charged bacterial cell and positively charged nylon membrane. So the advantages of the nylon membrane over the other membranes are : The dual binding, i.e. Adsorption as well as entrapment, thus resulting in a more stable immobilized membrane. Such specific Microbial consortium based BOD analytical devices, may find great application in monitoring of the degree of pollutant strength, in a wide variety of industrial waste water within a very short time.

Biosensors can be used to indirectly measure BOD via a fast (usually <30 min) to be determined BOD substitute and a corresponding calibration curve method (pioneered by Karube et al., 1977). Consequently, biosensors are now commercially available, but they do have several limitations such as their high maintenance costs, limited run lengths due to the need for reactivation, and the inability to respond to changing quality characteristics as would normally occur in wastewater treatment streams; e.g. diffusion processes of the biodegradable organic matter into the membrane and different responses by different microbial species which lead to problems with the reproducibility of result (Praet et al., 1995). Another important limitation is the uncertainty associated with the calibration function for translating the BOD substitute into the real BOD (Rustum et al., 2008).

=== Fluorescent ===
A surrogate to BOD_{5} has been developed using a resazurin derivative which reveals the extent of oxygen uptake by micro-organisms for organic matter mineralization. A cross-validation performed on 109 samples in Europe and the United-States showed a strict statistical equivalence between results from both methods.

An electrode has been developed based on the luminescence emission of a photo-active chemical compound and the quenching of that emission by oxygen. This quenching photophysics mechanism is described by the Stern–Volmer equation for dissolved oxygen in a solution:

$$I_0/I~=~1~+~K_{SV}~[\ce{O2}]$$

- $I$: Luminescence in the presence of oxygen
- $I_0$: Luminescence in the absence of oxygen
- $K_{SV}$: Stern-Volmer constant for oxygen quenching
- $\ce{[O2]}$: Dissolved oxygen concentration

The determination of oxygen concentration by luminescence quenching has a linear response over a broad range of oxygen concentrations and has excellent accuracy and reproducibility.

=== Polargraphic method ===
The development of an analytical instrument that utilizes the reduction-oxidation (redox) chemistry of oxygen in the presence of dissimilar metal electrodes was introduced during the 1950s. This redox electrode utilized an oxygen-permeable membrane to allow the diffusion of the gas into an electrochemical cell and its concentration determined by polarographic or galvanic electrodes. This analytical method is sensitive and accurate down to levels of ± 0.1 mg/L dissolved oxygen. Calibration of the redox electrode of this membrane electrode still requires the use of the Henry's law table or the Winkler test for dissolved oxygen.

=== Software sensor ===
There have been proposals for automation to make rapid prediction of BOD so it could be used for on-line process monitoring and control. For example, the use of a computerised machine learning method to make rapid inferences about BOD using easy to measure water quality parameters. Ones such as flow rate, chemical oxygen demand, ammonia, nitrogen, pH and suspended solids can be obtained directly and reliably using on-line hardware sensors. In a test of this idea, measurements of these values along with BOD which had been made over three years was used to train and test a model for prediction. The technique could allow for some missing data. It indicated that this approach was possible but needed sufficient historic data to be available.

=== Real-time BOD monitoring ===
Until recently, real-time monitoring of BOD was unattainable owing to its complex nature. Recent research by a leading UK university has discovered the link between multiple water quality parameters including electrical conductivity, turbidity, TLF and CDOM. These parameters are all capable of being monitored in real-time through a combination of traditional methods (electrical conductivity via electrodes) and newer methods such as fluorescence. The monitoring of tryptophan-like fluorescence (TLF) has been successfully utilised as a proxy for biological activity and enumeration, particularly with a focus on Escherichia coli (E. Coli). TLF based monitoring is applicable across a wide range of environments, including but by no means limited to sewage treatment works and freshwaters. Therefore, there has been a significant movement towards combined sensor systems that can monitor parameters and use them, in real-time, to provide a reading of BOD that is of laboratory quality.

== Dissolved oxygen probes: Membrane and luminescence ==
The development of an analytical instrument that utilizes the reduction-oxidation (redox) chemistry of oxygen in the presence of dissimilar metal electrodes was introduced during the 1950s. This redox electrode (also known as dissolved oxygen sensor) utilized an oxygen-permeable membrane to allow the diffusion of the gas into an electrochemical cell and its concentration determined by polarographic or galvanic electrodes. This analytical method is sensitive and accurate to down to levels of ± 0.1 mg/L dissolved oxygen. Calibration of the redox electrode of this membrane electrode still requires the use of the Henry's law table or the Winkler test for dissolved oxygen.

Dissolved oxygen sensor in a sewage treatment plant used as a feedback loop to control the blowers in an aeration system

== Test limitations ==
The test method involves variables limiting reproducibility. Tests normally show observations varying plus or minus ten to twenty percent around the mean.

=== Toxicity ===
Some wastes contain chemicals capable of suppressing microbiological growth or activity. Potential sources include industrial wastes, antibiotics in pharmaceutical or medical wastes, sanitizers in food processing or commercial cleaning facilities, chlorination disinfection used following conventional sewage treatment, and odor-control formulations used in sanitary waste holding tanks in passenger vehicles or portable toilets. Suppression of the microbial community oxidizing the waste will lower the test result.

=== Appropriate microbial population ===
The test relies upon a microbial ecosystem with enzymes capable of oxidizing the available organic material. Some waste waters, such as those from biological secondary sewage treatment, will already contain a large population of microorganisms acclimated to the water being tested. An appreciable portion of the waste may be utilized during the holding period prior to commencement of the test procedure. On the other hand, organic wastes from industrial sources may require specialized enzymes. Microbial populations from standard seed sources may take some time to produce those enzymes. A specialized seed culture may be appropriate to reflect conditions of an evolved ecosystem in the receiving waters.

== See also ==
- Theoretical oxygen demand
- Wastewater quality indicators discusses both BOD and COD as indicators of wastewater quality.
