= Melbourne Sandbelt =

- Region
- Coordinates: 37°58′26″S 145°7′6″E
- Country: Australia
- State: Victoria

The Melbourne Sandbelt is a region in southeastern Melbourne, Australia, known for its sandy soil. Several significant golf courses are located in the region.

== Location ==
The Melbourne Sandbelt is a rough triangle extending from Brighton south along the coast of Port Phillip Bay to Frankston and to the east as far as Clayton and Springvale.

== Geology ==
Much of Melbourne's eastern suburbs are covered by heavy clay subsoil. Around 20 million years ago, lower lying areas were flooded, which deposited sandstone material, now known as the Brighton Group. A map can be found in this paper. The Sandbelt suburbs are built on remnant sand dunes from this time. The sand can reach a depth of 80 metres in some places. Further east and north, the clay remains, and this region is sometimes referred to as the Clay Belt by contrast to the Sandbelt.

== Flora of the Sandbelt ==
The surface soils across the Sandbelt today are the result of the geology, topography, marine currents, climate and vegetation. The present-day coastal dune systems were formed in the last 6000 years by wave action depositing sand and silts from the bay onto its beaches. The most prominent dune systems are between Mordialloc and Frankston. This formed a coastal barrier, behind which occurs the Carrum Carrum Swamp in a section of the Port-Phillip sunkland.

Currently, the Sandbelt region has been impacted by extensive suburb growth, and there are few locations where the remnant vegetation has been preserved. Revegetation efforts by local councils are ongoing, and seek to return the land back to the remnant vegetation (prior to European settlement). To help achieve this, various vegetation communities have been identified.

The following table presents the different vegetation communities of the Sandbelt, along with a list of associated species.

Vegetation communities of the Sandbelt
Attribute	Primary dune vegetation	Coastal scrub	Wetlands	Heathy woodlands
Vegetation community and soil properties	Example location: Carrum Beach; Soil: Wind blown sands on beach dunes, normally with high pH.	Example location: Mentone Beach; Soil: Coastal sand dunes and sandstone bluff, inland of primary dune vegetation.	Example location: Braeside Park, Braeside; Soil: Variable, usually heavy, clayey soils, relatively high in nutrients with permanently and seasonally inundated areas.	Example location: Bradshaw Bushland Reserve, Mordialloc. Soil: Deep free-draining, nutrient poor sands on crests and slopes of undulating sand hills and ridges, usually slightly acidic.
Ground layer	Poa poiformis; Spinifex sericeus; Actites megalocarpa; Apium prostratum; Austrostipa stipoides; Carex pumila; Carpobrotus rossii; Lepidosperma gladiatum; Ficinia nodosa; Imperata cylindrica; Acaena ovina; Galenia pubescens; Dianella brevicaulis; Senecio pinnatifolius; Zoysia macrantha	Dichondra repens; Lepidosperma gladiatum; Acaena novae-zelandiae; Acaena ovina; Rytidosperma geniculata; Austrostipa flavescens; Austrostipa mollis; Carpobrotus rossii; Carpobrotus edulis; Chrysocephalum apiculatum; Dianella brevicaulis; Ficinia nodosa; Geranium potentilloides; Lepidosperma concavum; Lomandra longifolia; Microlaena stipoides; Pelargonium australe; Senecio pinnatifolius	Azolla filiculoides; Agrostis avenacea; Eleocharis acuta; Poa labillardieri; Alisma plantago-aquatica; Machaerina articulata; Machaerina juncea; Machaerina tetragona; Bolboschoenus medianus; Carex appressa; Carex gaudichaudiana; Centella cordifolia; Isolepis inundata; Lemna disperma; Persicaria decipiens; Phragmites australis; Potamogeton pectinatus; Potamogeton cheesemanii; Cycnogeton procerum; Ottelia ovalifolia	Dianella revoluta; Goodenia geniculata; Kennedia prostrata; Lagenophora stipitata; Laxmannia orientalis; Lomandra longifolia; Lomandra filiformis; Opercularia varia; Patersonia fragilis; Thelionema caespitosum; Thysanotus patersonii; Trachymene composita
Climbers	Tetragonia implexicoma	Clematis microphylla; Muehlenbeckia adpressa	Cassytha pubescens	Clematis microphylla; Comesperma volubile
Shrubs	Atriplex cinerea; Leucophyta brownii; Alyxia buxifolia; Rhagodia candolleana	Acacia longifolia; Leptospermum laevigatum; Bursaria spinosa; Goodenia ovata; Rhagodia candolleana; Leucopogon parviflorus; Myoporum insulare; Alyxia buxifolia; Correa alba; Lasiopetalum baueri; Olearia axillaris; Ozothamnus turbinatus; Pomaderris paniculosa	Typha domingensis; Typha orientalis; Gahnia sieberiana	Acacia paradoxa; Bossiaea cinerea; Dillwynia sericea; Epacris impressa; Hakea ulicina; Hibbertia acicularis; Hibbertia sericea; Isopogon ceratophyllus; Leptospermum continentale; Leucopogon ericoides; Leucopogon virgatus; Olearia ramulosa; Persoonia juniperina; Platylobium obtusangulum
Trees	None	Allocasuarina verticillata; Banksia integrifolia	Melaleuca ericifolia	Eucalyptus viminalis ssp. pryoriana; Eucalyptus cephalocarpa; Eucalyptus radiata; Acacia melanoxylon; Acacia implexa; Allocasuarina littoralis; Exocarpus cupressiformis

== Sand mining ==
Sand mining has been conducted in the Sandbelt region since the 1880s. Several former sand mining sites have been used for landfill waste disposal once mining ceased.

== Golf courses ==
Sandy soil is particularly suitable for golf courses. It is easy to place bunkers wherever a course designer chooses, without the need to carry in sand from another location, and it is easy to ensure appropriate drainage. A feature of several Melbourne Sandbelt courses is that bunkers are cut right on the edge of a green, which is not possible in other courses with different soil types.

There are several major championship courses in the Melbourne Sandbelt which are regularly listed among the world's best. Notable courses include Royal Melbourne Golf Club, Victoria Golf Club, Kingston Heath Golf Club, Huntingdale Golf Club, and Metropolitan Golf Club. Royal Melbourne and Kingston Heath both feature in the Golf Digest top 20 courses in the world.

=== Major championship courses ===
- Commonwealth Golf Club, Oakleigh South
- Huntingdale Golf Club, Oakleigh South
- Kingston Heath, Heatherton
- Metropolitan Golf Club, Oakleigh South
- Royal Melbourne Golf Club, Black Rock
- Victoria Golf Club, Cheltenham
- Yarra Yarra Golf Club, Bentleigh East

=== Private courses ===
- Capital Golf Club, Heatherton
- Cheltenham Golf Club, Cheltenham
- Eastern Sward Golf Club, Bangholme
- Keysborough Golf Club, Keysborough
- Long Island Country Club, Frankston North
- Patterson River Golf Club, Bonbeach
- Peninsula Kingswood Country Golf Club, Frankston
- Rossdale Golf Club, Aspendale
- Sandhurst Club, Skye
- Southern Golf Club, Keysborough
- Spring Valley Golf Club, Clayton South
- Woodlands Golf Club, Mordialloc

=== Public courses ===
- Amstel Park, Cranbourne
- Brighton Golf Course Brighton, Victoria
- Centenary Park, Frankston
- Chelsea Public Golf Course, Edithvale
- Sandringham Golf Course, Cheltenham and Black Rock
- Spring Park Golf Course, Dingley Village
