= Native carrot =

Native carrot is a common name for several plants and may refer to:

- Daucus glochidiatus
- Several species of Geranium, including:
  - Geranium potentilloides
  - Geranium solanderi, native to Australia and New Zealand
