= Kingston Heath Golf Club =

Golf club in Melbourne, Australia

- Location within Australia Location within Victoria Location within Melbourne
- 37°57′33.57″S 145°05′16.27″E

Club information
- Location: Cheltenham, Victoria, Australia
- Established: 1909
- Type: Private
- Total holes: 19
- Tournaments: Australian Open (7); Women's Australian Open (1); World Cup of Golf (1); Australian Masters (2); Victorian Open (7); Australian Matchplay (7)
- Greens: A1 Bent
- Fairways: Santa Ana Couch
- Website: www.kingstonheath.melbourne
- Designed by: Dan Soutar
- Par: 72

Kingston Heath Golf Club is one of the premier golf clubs in Australia, located in Cheltenham, Victoria. The course is situated on the sandbelt region in the southeast suburbs of Melbourne famed for its golf courses, with Kingston Heath consistently ranked in the top 3 courses in Australia and top 20 courses in the world.

The club has hosted many major events, including 7 x Men's Australian Opens, 1 x Women's Australian Open, 7 x Victorian Opens, 2 x Australian Masters and the 2016 World Cup of Golf. The Men's Australian Open was scheduled to return to Kingston Heath in 2020 but was cancelled due to the COVID-19 pandemic.

Kingston Heath will host the Presidents Cup in 2028.

== History ==
=== Elsternwick Park (1909–1925) ===
Kingston Heath was originally formed as the Elsternwick Golf Club in 1909, and was based at present day Elsternwick Park. In 1920, the committee discussed a relocation to the South-Eastern suburbs of Melbourne. This area would become world famous as the Melbourne Sandbelt.

=== Cheltenham (1925–present) ===
The club relocated to its present location in Cheltenham in 1925. This move included the complete dismantling, moving and re-assembling of the original clubhouse to the new site. The club officially opened in April 1925, and was renamed Kingston Heath 5 months later.

== Course ==
The current course was designed by Dan Soutar and was constructed by M.A Morcom. Originally, it played as a par 82 and at the time was the longest course in Australia. Its founders were of the opinion that it was easier to shorten the course rather than to lengthen it. The original scorecard read as below:

Original Scorecard - 1925
| Hole | 1 | 2 | 3 | 4 | 5 | 6 | 7 | 8 | 9 | Out | 10 | 11 | 12 | 13 | 14 | 15 | 16 | 17 | 18 | In | Total |
|---|---|---|---|---|---|---|---|---|---|---|---|---|---|---|---|---|---|---|---|---|---|
| Yards | 432 | 360 | 277 | 416 | 195 | 430 | 489 | 425 | 355 | 3,379 | 132 | 431 | 471 | 351 | 535 | 222 | 418 | 452 | 421 | 3,433 | 6,812 |
| Par | 5 | 5 | 4 | 5 | 3 | 5 | 5 | 5 | 4 | 41 | 3 | 5 | 5 | 4 | 5 | 4 | 5 | 5 | 5 | 41 | 82 |

Advice was sought from Alister MacKenzie during his visit to Australia in 1926, who provided a suitable bunkering strategy for the course. Although many link MacKenzie to the actual design of Kingston Heath, his only course routing input was to change the 15th hole. This was a short par 4 (222 yards) which played as a blind tee shot over a hill before descending to the green. MacKenzie's recommendation was to shorten the hole, bringing the green to the top of the rise and becoming a tricky, uphill par 3. Work commenced soon after, with the newly rated par 3 15th becoming one of the most recognisable holes in Australian golf, and Kingston Heath's signature hole.

Over the years, the par of the course has gradually dropped, now playing as a par 72 for Men and 74 for Women.

In 2002, the club constructed a 19th hole - a par 3 positioned between the 1st green and 2nd tee. This hole was designed to championship specifications, allowing the club to insert it into the course rotation during times of required maintenance of another hole. The 19th has since become a fixture in the club's "Tournament" course, often replacing the 10th hole in major events.

An interesting feature of the course is the adaptability in producing different layouts. Given it does not allow a traditional "9 out, 9 in" layout as many courses of its stature do, an alternative was required for the hosting of major events. The introduction of the 19th hole assisted in allowing the club to produce a more tournament friendly layout, known as the "Inner and Outer" course, routing players through the 9 innermost holes of the property as the front 9, returning them to the clubhouse after 9 holes. They then play the 9 outermost holes of the property as the back 9, allowing them to finish on the 18th hole.

=== Course records ===
- Professional

(Men) Mark Brown: 62 (-10), during Round 2 of The Open IFQ, 2013
(Women) Karrie Webb & Jiyai Shin: 67 (-6), both recorded during the final round of the 2008 MFS Women's Australian Open

- Amateur

(Men) Cruze Strange: 63 (-9), during the 2011 Port Phillip Amateur Championship
(Women) Stephanie Kyriacou: 66 (-8), during the 2017 Port Phillip Amateur Championship

== Championships ==
=== Professional events ===
- Australian Open: 7

| Year | Winner | Country | Score | | | | | Winning margin | Runner-up |
| Year | Winner | Country | R1 | R2 | R3 | R4 | Total | Winning margin | Runner-up |
|---|---|---|---|---|---|---|---|---|---|
| 1948 | Ossie Pickworth | Australia | 72 | 73 | 70 | 74 | 289 (+1) | Playoff | (Australia) Jim Ferrier |
| 1957 | Frank Phillips | Australia | 68 | 70 | 75 | 74 | 287 (−1) | 1 shot | (South Africa) Gary Player (Australia) Ossie Pickworth |
| 1970 | Gary Player | South Africa | 71 | 65 | 70 | 74 | 280 (−8) | 3 shots | (Australia) Bruce Devlin |
| 1983 | Peter Fowler | Australia | 72 | 76 | 68 | 69 | 285 (−3) | 3 shots | (Australia) Ian Baker-Finch |
| 1989 | Peter Senior | Australia | 66 | 66 | 69 | 70 | 271 (−17) | 6 shots | (Australia) Peter Fowler |
| 1995 | Greg Norman | Australia | 72 | 69 | 69 | 68 | 278 (−10) | 2 shots | (Australia) Peter McWhinney |
| 2000 | Aaron Baddeley | Australia | 69 | 69 | 68 | 72 | 278 (−10) | 2 shots | (Australia) Robert Allenby |

- Women's Australian Open: 1

| Year | Winner | Country | Score | | | | | Winning margin | Runner-up |
| Year | Winner | Country | R1 | R2 | R3 | R4 | Total | Winning margin | Runner-up |
|---|---|---|---|---|---|---|---|---|---|
| 2008 | Karrie Webb | Australia | 72 | 72 | 73 | 67 | 284 (−8) | Playoff | (South Korea) Jiyai Shin |

- World Cup of Golf: 1

| Year | Winners | Country | Score | | | | | Winning margin | Runner-up |
| Year | Winners | Country | R1 | R2 | R3 | R4 | Total | Winning margin | Runner-up |
|---|---|---|---|---|---|---|---|---|---|
| 2016 | Søren Kjeldsen; Thorbjørn Olesen | Denmark | 72 | 60 | 70 | 66 | 268 (−20) | 4 shots | China (Wu Ashun & Li Haotong); France (Victor Dubuisson & Romain Langasque); United States (Rickie Fowler & Jimmy Walker) |

- Australian Masters: 2

| Year | Winner | Country | Score | | | | | Winning margin | Runner-up |
| Year | Winner | Country | R1 | R2 | R3 | R4 | Total | Winning margin | Runner-up |
|---|---|---|---|---|---|---|---|---|---|
| 2009 | Tiger Woods | United States | 66 | 68 | 72 | 68 | 274 (−14) | 2 shots | (Australia) Greg Chalmers |
| 2012 | Adam Scott | Australia | 67 | 70 | 67 | 67 | 271 (−17) | 4 shots | (England) Ian Poulter |

- Victorian Open: 7

| Year | Winner | Country | Score | Winning margin | Runner-up |
|---|---|---|---|---|---|
| 1958 | Peter Thomson | Australia | 289 (−7) | 3 shots | (Australia) Barry West |
| 1969 | Kel Nagle | Australia | 279 (−17) | 3 shots | (Australia) Bill Dunk (Australia) Peter Thomson |
| 1976 | Guy Wolstenholme | England | 281 (−7) | Playoff | (Australia) Graham Marsh |
| 1979 | Rodger Davis | Australia | 291 (+3) | Playoff | (Australia) Geoff Parslow (South Africa) Gary Player |
| 1987 | Roger Mackay | Australia | 277 (−11) | 1 shot | (Australia) Greg Norman |
| 1988 | Jim Benepe | United States | 282 (−6) | 3 shots | (Australia) Ian Baker-Finch (Australia) Peter McWhinney |
| 1989 | Mike Clayton | Australia | 285 (−3) | 2 shots | (Australia) Ossie Moore |

- Australian Match Play Championship: 7

1986, 1987, 1988, 1989, 1990, 1991, 1992

| Year | Winner | Country | Winning margin | Runner-up |
Robert Boyd Transport Australian Match Play Championship
| 1986 | Peter Fowler | Australia | 6 & 5 | (Australia) Bob Shearer |
| 1987 | Ian Baker-Finch | Australia | 5 & 4 | (Australia) Ossie Moore |
Mercedes-Benz Australian Match Play Championship
| 1988 | Ronan Rafferty | Northern Ireland | 1 up | (Australia) Mike Clayton |
| 1989 | Ossie Moore | Australia | 1 up | (Australia) Peter Fowler |
| 1990 | David Smith | Australia | 4 & 2 | (Australia) Peter Fowler |
| 1991 | Chris Patton | United States | 5 & 3 | (Australia) Ken Dukes |
| 1992 | Mike Clayton | Australia | 4 & 3 | (Australia) Peter McWhinney |

=== The Open Championship International Final Qualifying ===
Kingston Heath was the preferred Australian venue of the R&A for the staging of International Final Qualifying for The Open Championship, which was held each January from 2004 to 2013.

=== Amateur events ===
- Australian Men's Amateur Championship: 1 (1963)
- Australian Women's Amateur Championship: 2 (1952, 1996)

== Course ranking ==
The course is consistently ranked within the top 3 courses in Australia. It also regularly features in publications such as Golf Digest and Golf Magazine in their "World's Top 100 Golf Courses" lists, which has seen Kingston Heath hold a position in the top-20 for a number of years.

| Year | Source | Ranking |
Australia's Top 100 Courses
| 2020 | Australian Golf Digest | #3 |
| 2018 | Australian Golf Digest | #2 |
| 2016 | Australian Golf Digest | #2 |
| 2014 | Australian Golf Digest | #2 |
| 2012 | Australian Golf Digest | #2 |
| 2010 | Australian Golf Digest | #1 Golf Course in Australia |
World's Top 100 Courses
| 2020 | Planet Golf | #17 |
| 2018 | Golf Digest | #16 |
| 2016 | Golf Digest | #18 |
| 2014 | Golf Digest | #20 |

== See also ==
- List of links golf courses
