= Dwarf sedge =

Dwarf sedge is a common name for several small sedges and may refer to:

- Carex humilis, native to Europe
- Carex paupera, native to Australia
- Carex pumila, introduced to North America
