= Australian Match Play Championship =

Tournament information
- Location: Melbourne, Australia
- Established: 1986
- Course: Kingston Heath Golf Club
- Par: 72
- Tour: PGA Tour of Australasia
- Format: Match play
- Prize fund: A$200,000
- Month played: February
- Final year: 1992

Tournament record score
- Score: 6 and 5 Peter Fowler (1986)

Final champion
- (Australia) Mike Clayton
- Location in Australia Location in Victoria

The Australian Match Play Championship was a golf tournament held in Australia between 1986 and 1992 at Kingston Heath Golf Club, Melbourne. In 1986, the event was contested by 16 players over two days. In 1987, it was played over three days. The field was increased to 24 with eight players receiving a bye to the second round. The final was over 36 holes. In 1989, the field increased to 32 with play over four days. There was one 18-hole round on the first two days, two rounds on the third day and a 36-hole final on the final day. Each year there was also a third-place playoff. Prize money was A$60,000 in 1986, A$100,000 in 1987 and 1988, A$150,000 in 1989 and A$200,000 from 1990 to 1992.

== Winners ==
Year	Winner	Margin of victory	Runner-up	Winner's share (A$)	Ref.
Australian Match Play Championship
1993	Cancelled				
Mercedes-Benz Australian Match Play Championship
1992	(Australia) Mike Clayton	4 and 3	(Australia) Peter McWhinney	36,000	
1991	(United States) Chris Patton	5 and 3	(Australia) Ken Dukes	36,000	
1990	(Australia) David Iwasaki-Smith	4 and 2	(Australia) Peter Fowler	36,000	
1989	(Australia) Ossie Moore	1 up	(Australia) Peter Fowler	32,000	
1988	(Northern Ireland) Ronan Rafferty	1 up	(Australia) Mike Clayton	20,000	
Robert Boyd Transport Australian Match Play Championship
1987	(Australia) Ian Baker-Finch	5 and 4	(Australia) Ossie Moore	20,000	
1986	(Australia) Peter Fowler	6 and 5	(Australia) Bob Shearer	16,000	
