= Carex bichenoviana =

Scientific classification
- Kingdom: Plantae
- Clade: Tracheophytes
- Clade: Angiosperms
- Clade: Monocots
- Clade: Commelinids
- Order: Poales
- Family: Cyperaceae
- Genus: Carex
- Species: C. bichenoviana

Binomial name
- Carex bichenoviana Boott

Synonyms
- Carex pumila var. bichenoviana (Boott) Kük.

Species of grass-like plant

Carex bichenoviana, the plains sedge, is a species of sedge that was first formally named by Francis Boott in 1858. It is native to eastern Australia and has been introduced to New Zealand. It has previously been considered a variety of Carex pumila.
