= Papilionaceous flower =

Butterfly-like flowers

Flower parts of a Chinese wisteria. It has a diadelphous stamen morphology (one stamen not fused with the remaining nine), which Linnaeus classed as the Diadelphia.

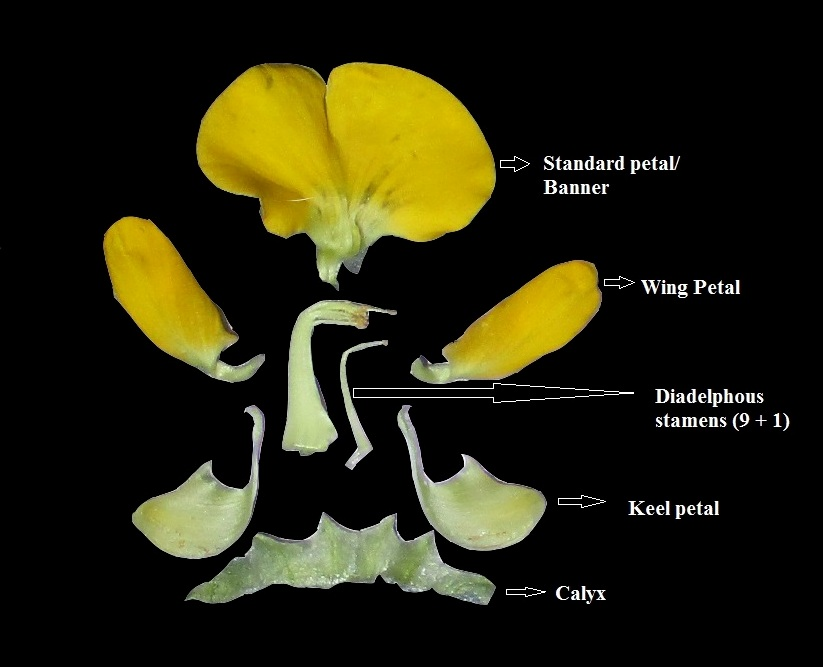
Dissected flower parts of Sesbania bispinosa

Papilionaceous flowers (from Latin: papilion, a butterfly) are flowers with the characteristic irregular and butterfly-like corolla found in many, though not all, plants of the species-rich subfamily Faboideae of legumes. Tournefort suggested that the term Flores papilionacei originated with Valerius Cordus, who applied it to the flowers of the bean.

== Structure ==
=== Corolla ===
The flowers have a bilateral symmetry with the corolla consisting of five petals. A single, large, upper petal is known as the banner (also vexillum or standard petal). The semi-cylindrical base of the banner embraces and compresses two equal and smaller lateral wings (or alae). The wings in turn enclose a pair of small keel petals, that are situated somewhat lower than the wings, but are interior to them. They have concave sides and correspond with the shape of the wings. The two keel petals are fused at their bases or stuck together to form a boat-shaped structure that encloses the essential flower organs, namely the androecium and gynoecium. Typically these flowers have a vexillary (i.e. descendingly imbricate or overlapping) aestivation.

=== Stamens ===
The stamens often have a diadelphous morphology, meaning that they are united in two sets with a distinct filament shape in each set. The inferior set forms a membranous sheath at its base, that envelops the single, superior pistil in a tube. The tube divides into nine filaments, which trace the base of the keel petals that enclose them. The single free filament lies above them. In Smithia the two sets are equal, with 5 stamens in each.

Many papilionaceous flowers however have ten distinct stamens. Genera that conform to the latter morphology include Sophora, Anagyris, Cercis, Daviesia, Dillwynia, Gompholobium, Mirbelia and Pultenaea.

== Ecology ==
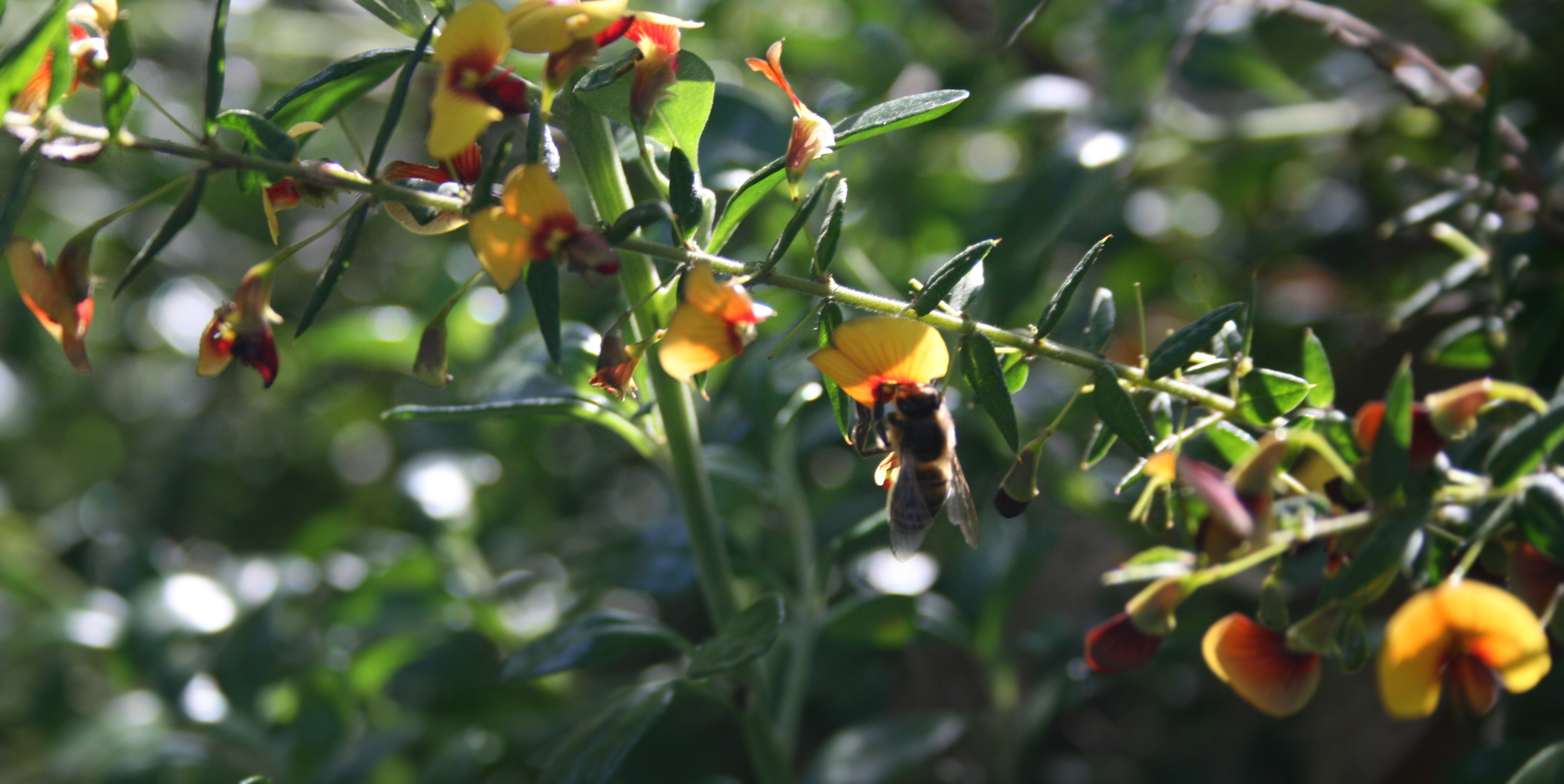
A bee pollinating the flower of Bossiaea cinerea.

Charles Darwin observed that the fertility of plants with papilionaceous flowers depend to an important extent on visits by bees, and it is accepted that this corolla structure evolved under selective pressure of bee pollinators. Linnaeus remarked that they produce hardly any scent, but the flowers of Spanish broom, sweet pea, scorpion vetch, European yellow lupine, fava bean and various species of clover are notable exceptions.

Four different mechanisms of pollen release are known in papilionaceous flowers, which are respectively known as the explosive, valvular, piston and brush mechanisms. In the explosive or tripping mechanism (cf. alfalfa, common broom, ox-eye bean) all pollen is instantly released when pressure on the staminal column is permanently released (usually by an insect) causing it to snap against the standard petal. In the valvular mechanism pollen is released repeatedly when pollinators unseal the upper rim of the keel petals, and force them downwards. In the piston mechanism (cf. scorpion senna) pollen is released repeatedly when the keel tip is moved by an insect so as to release pollen through a hole in the tip. The brush mechanism employs a pistil which is longer than the stamens, so as to avoid self-pollination. When a pollinator presses against the standard and wing petals, a brush on the temporarily lifted pistil brushes pollen onto the pollinator, while the stigma receives external pollen.

== Examples and exceptions ==
Well-known plant genera in the Faboideae which exhibit this corolla morphology include beans, peas, sweet peas, alfalfa (lucerne), clovers, lupines, smoke trees, black locusts, locoweeds and coral trees. The flowers of coral trees are diadelphous and are considered papilionaceous, but the wings are much reduced, suggesting a flower with three petals. Their keel petals are elongate, fused together and sometimes tubular to facilitate pollination by certain bird groups, while secondary compounds in their nectar seem to repel bees.

The false indigo genus, though belonging to the Faboideae, does not exhibit a papilionaceous corolla morphology, as it has only one petal per flower, namely the banner. The corolla of clovers tends to be monopetalous, as all five petals are often fused below to form a tube.

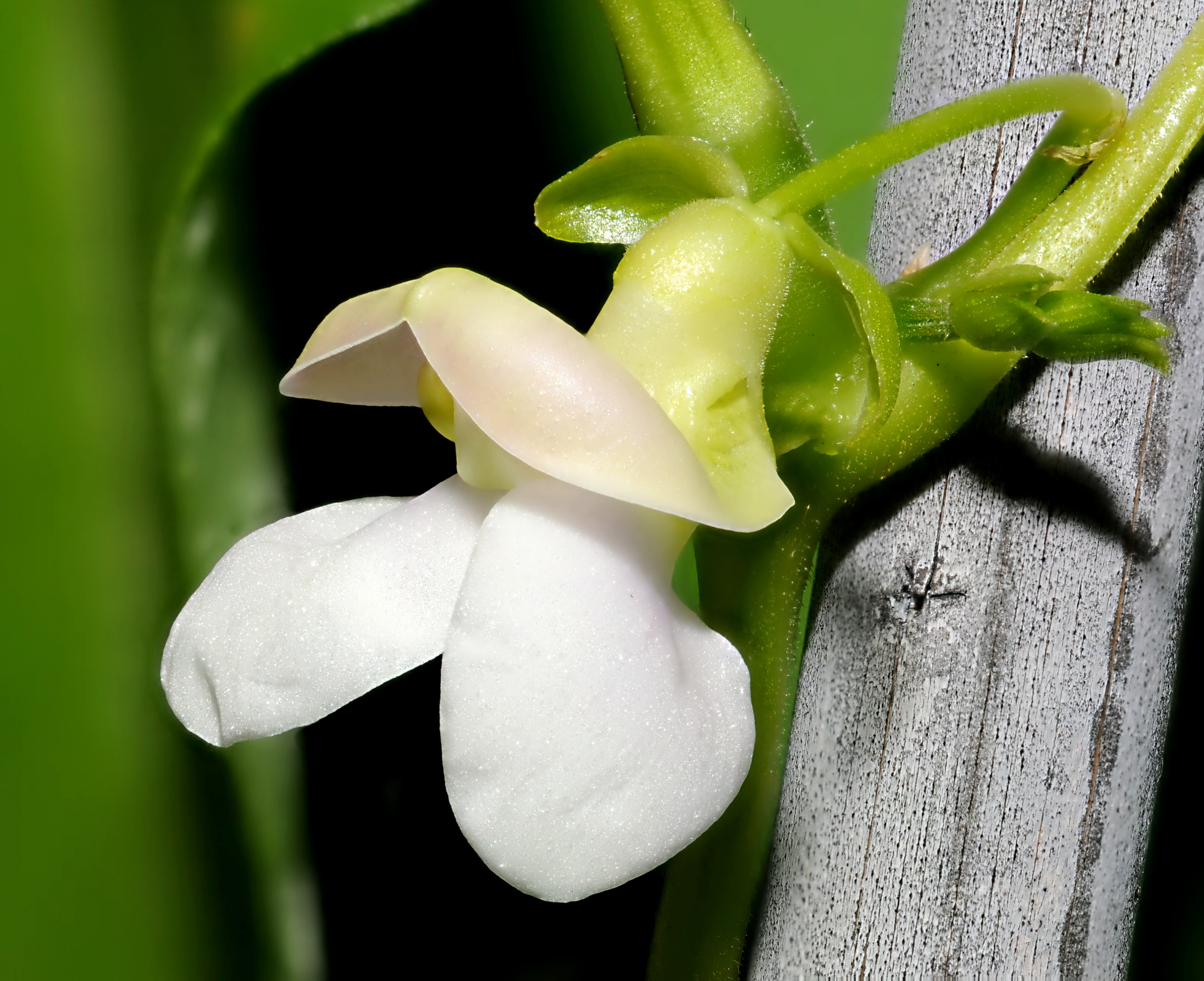
Common bean flower

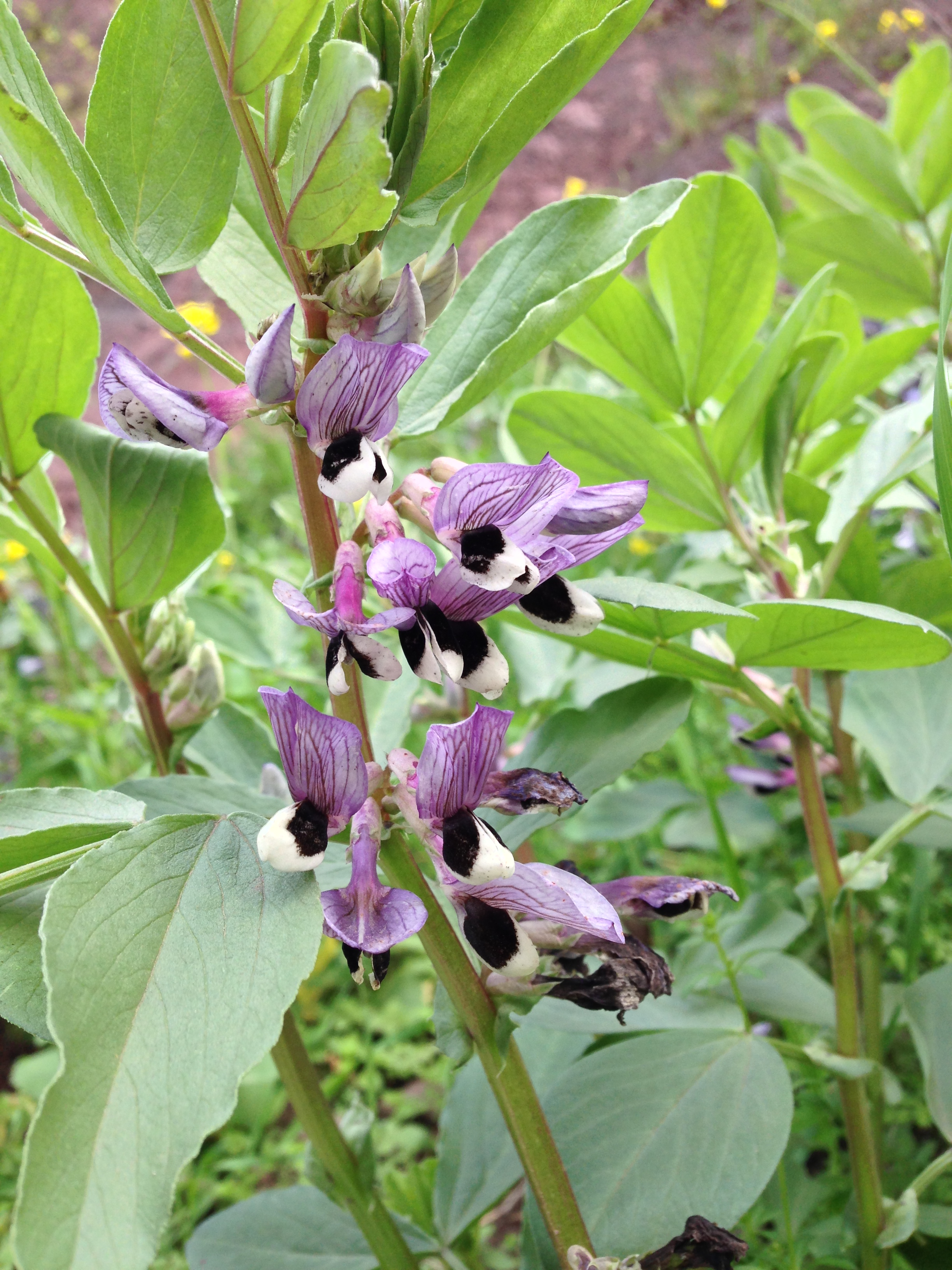
Fava bean flowers with purple banners and pied wings

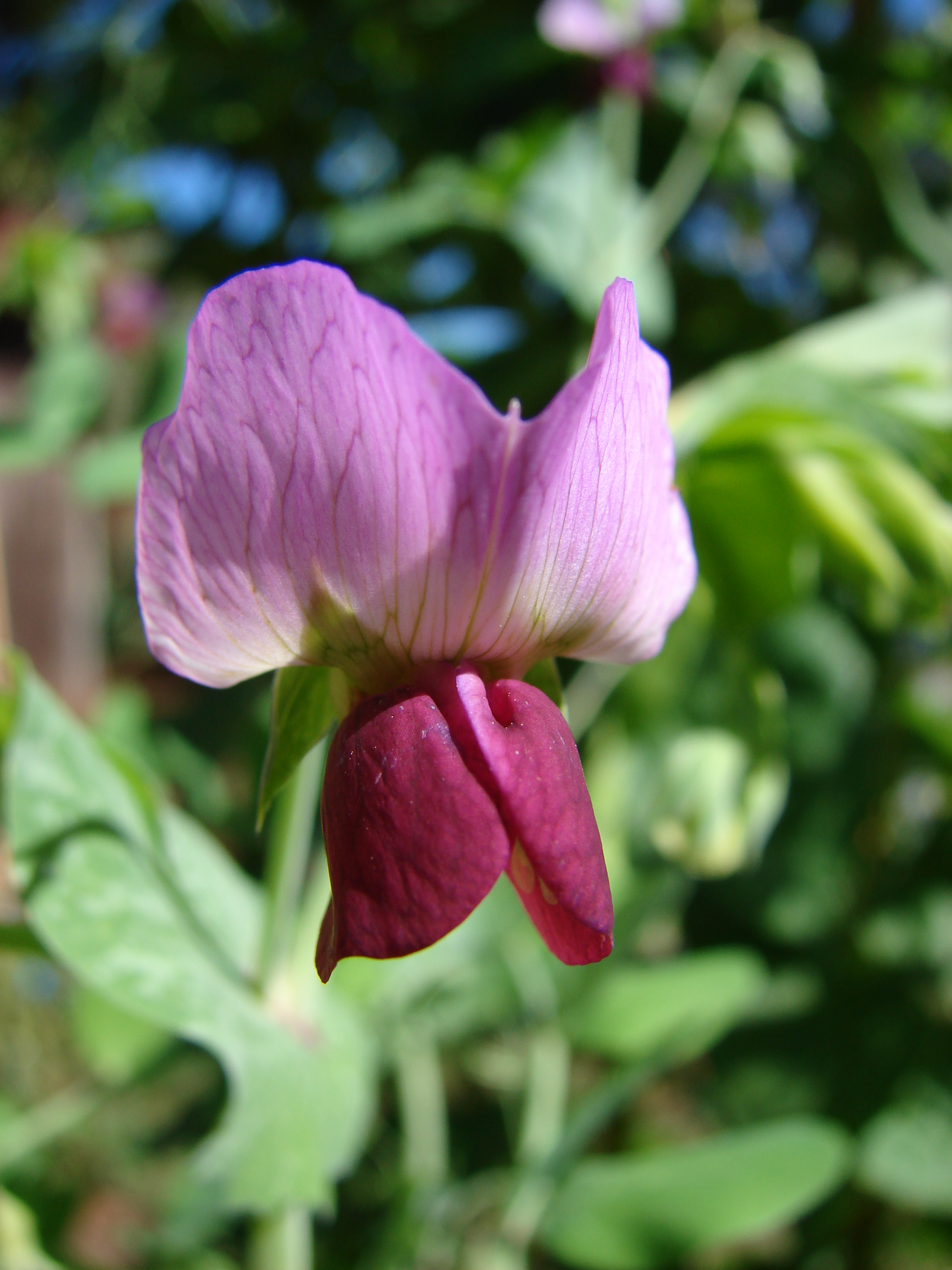
Pea flower with pink banner and maroon wings

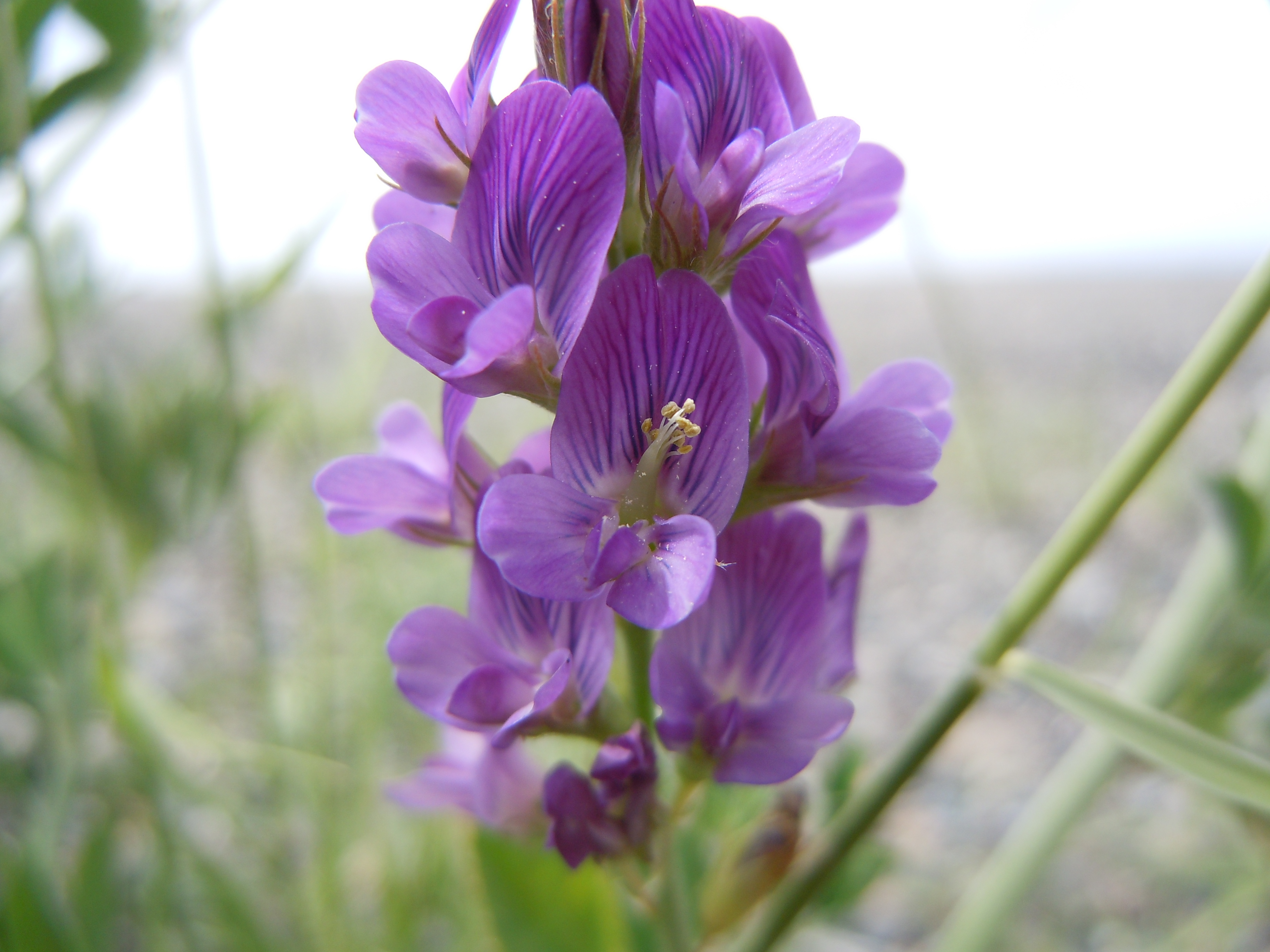
Alfalfa flowers with staminal column of central flower tripped

== Other legume subfamilies ==
To the contrary, plants in the Mimosoideae subfamily of legumes have the petals reduced, and have numerous stamens arranged in showy spikes. In the Caesalpinioideae subfamily of legumes the upper petal is initially enveloped by the lateral petals, before the petals unfold to assume a radial five-fold symmetry. The aestivation of Mimosoideae, Caesalpinioideae and Faboideae is presented in diagram below.

== See also ==
- Pollination syndrome
- Zoophily
