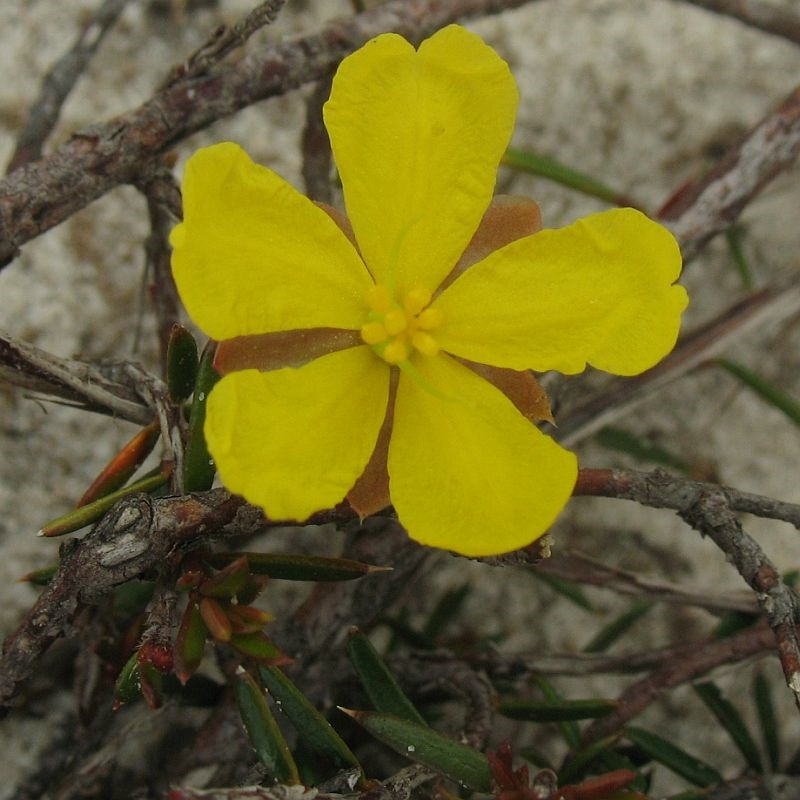
- In Bournda National Park

Scientific classification
- Kingdom: Plantae
- Clade: Tracheophytes
- Clade: Angiosperms
- Clade: Eudicots
- Order: Dilleniales
- Family: Dilleniaceae
- Genus: Hibbertia
- Species: H. acicularis

Binomial name
- Hibbertia acicularis (Labill.) F.Muell.

Synonyms
- Hibbertia acicularis (Labill.) F.Muell. var. acicularis; Pleurandra acicularis Labill.

= Hibbertia acicularis =

Prickly guinea-flower

Species of flowering plant

Hibbertia acicularis, commonly known as prickly guinea-flower, is a species of flowering plant in the family Dilleniaceae and is endemic to eastern Australia. It is an erect or prostrate shrub with linear to lance-shaped leaves and yellow flowers arranged singly in leaf axils with the six to eight stamens joined at the base, in a single cluster.

== Description ==
Hibbertia acicularis is an erect to prostrate, openly-branched shrub that typically grows to a height of up to 1 m (3 ft 3 in). The leaves are linear to lance-shaped with an awned tip, mostly 7–9 mm (0.28–0.35 in) long and 0.6–0.7 mm (0.024–0.028 in) wide on a petiole 0.2–0.5 mm (0.0079–0.0197 in) long. The flowers are arranged singly in leaf axils on a thread-like peduncle 2–10 mm (0.079–0.394 in) long with a narrow egg-shaped bract. The sepals are 3.8–6 mm (0.15–0.24 in) long but of unequal lengths. The petals are yellow, 3.9–5 mm (0.15–0.20 in) long and egg-shaped with the narrower end towards the base. The six to eight stamens are joined at the base in a single cluster, all on one side of the two carpels. The carpels are velvety to woolly hairy and there are usually two ovules per carpel. Flowering occurs from September to December.

== Taxonomy ==
Prickly guinea-flower was first formally described in 1806 by Jacques Labillardière who gave it the name Pleurandra acicularis in his book Novae Hollandiae Plantarum Specimen. In 1862, Ferdinand von Mueller changed the name to Hibbertia acicularis in his book The Plants Indigenous to the Colony of Victoria. The specific epithet (acicularis) means "needle-pointed".

== Distribution and habitat ==
Hibbertia acicularis grows in heath, woodland and forest in south-eastern Queensland, the coast and tablelands of New South Wales, east of Port Phillip Bay in Victoria, and in Tasmania.

== See also ==
- List of Hibbertia species
