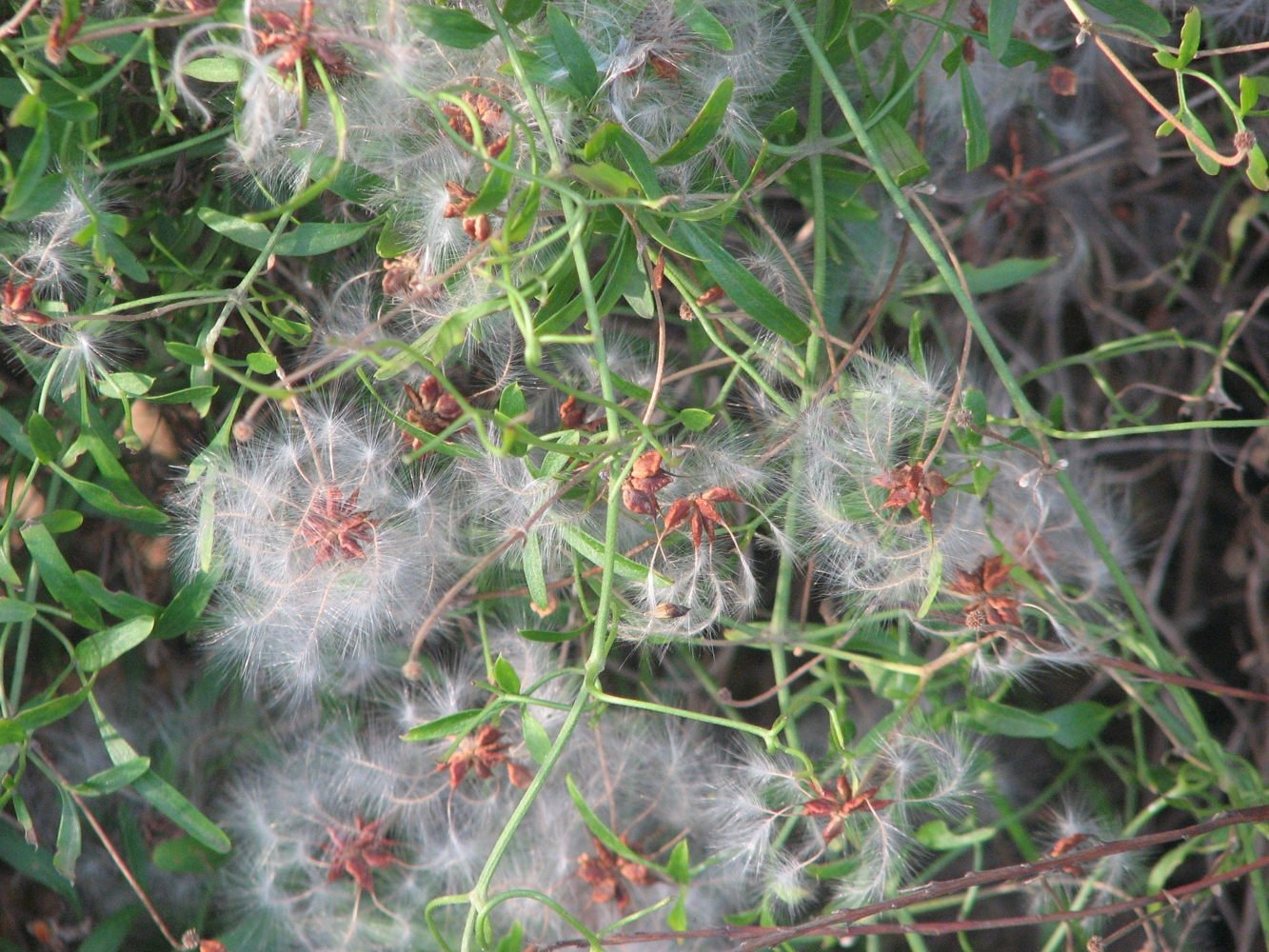

Scientific classification
- Kingdom: Plantae
- Clade: Tracheophytes
- Clade: Angiosperms
- Clade: Eudicots
- Order: Ranunculales
- Family: Ranunculaceae
- Genus: Clematis
- Species: C. microphylla

Binomial name
- Clematis microphylla DC.

= Clematis microphylla =

Species of flowering plant in the buttercup family

Clematis microphylla (Small-leaved Clematis) is one of 8 Clematis species native to Australia. It occurs in all states and the ACT, but not in the Northern Territory.

It is a common, quick-growing, small-leaved climbing species which prefers full sun and good drainage. It is very frost tolerant (-5 degrees Celsius). There are two variants,

- Clematis microphylla var. microphylla, leaves over 20 mm long and 3 mm wide
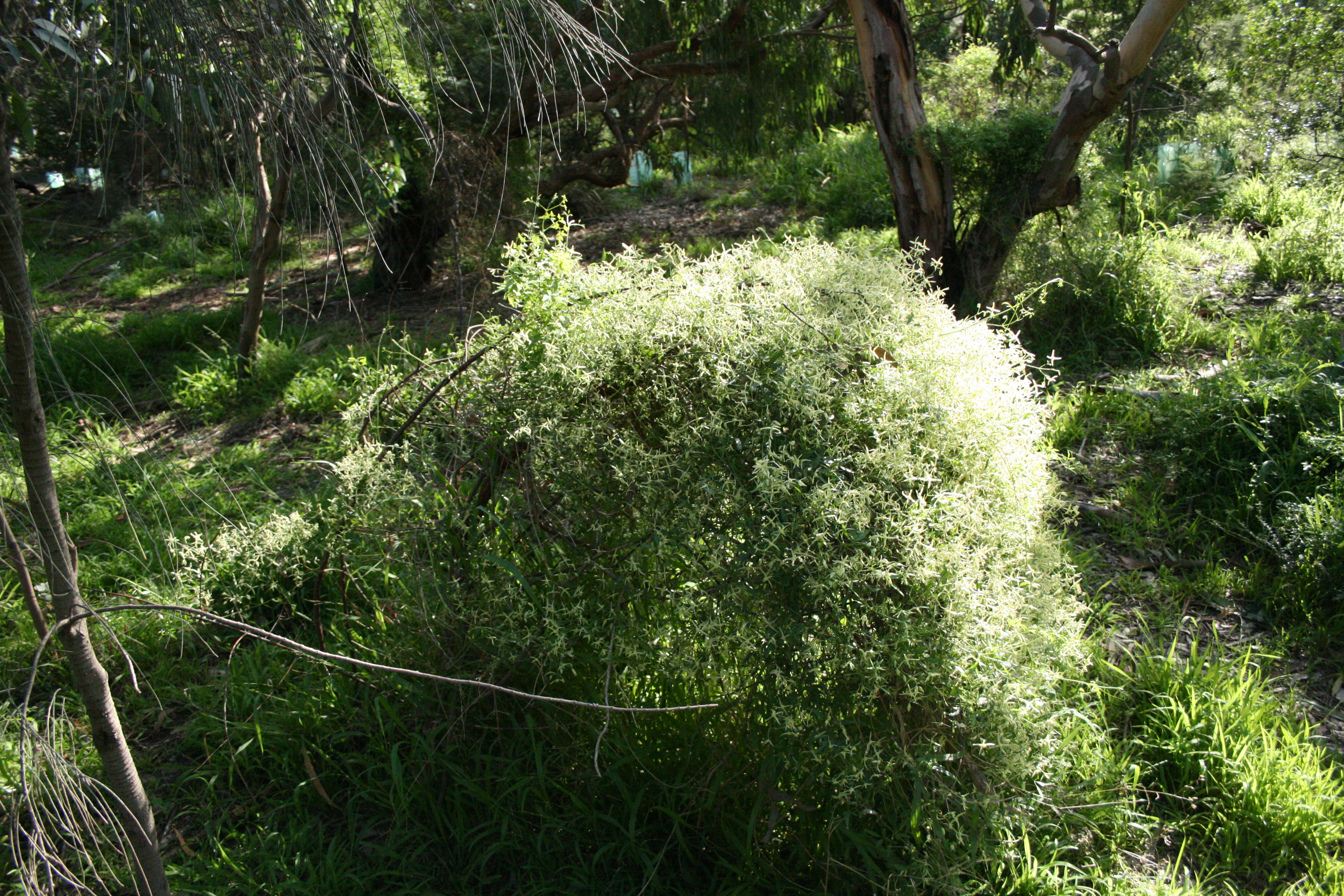
Clematis microphylla var. microphylla in its natural habitat

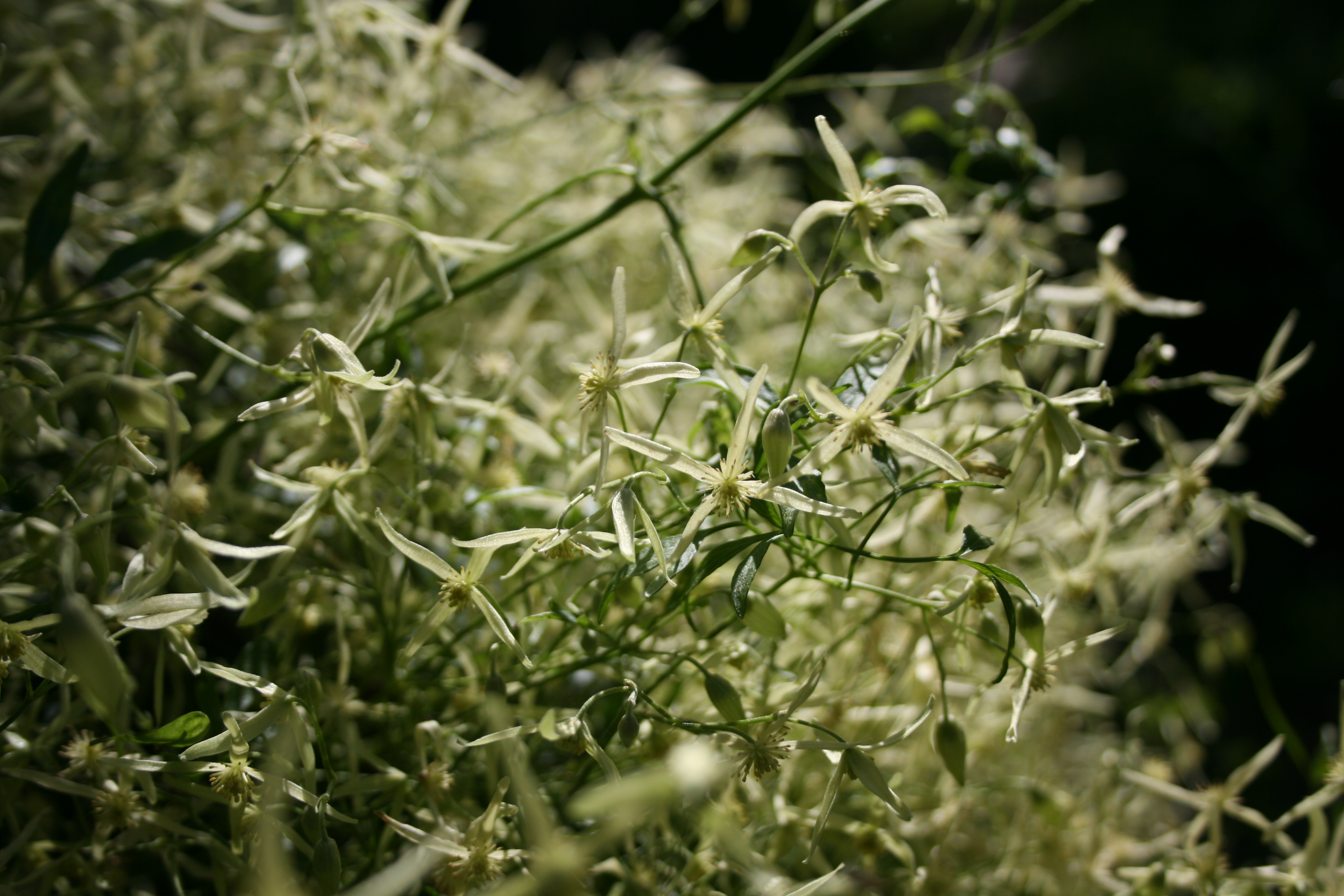
A close-up of the flowers of Clematis microphylla var. microphylla
- Clematis microphylla var. leptophylla, leaves less than 20 mm long and 3 mm wide - a medium sided climber with cream-green flowers through spring followed by bearded fruit.
