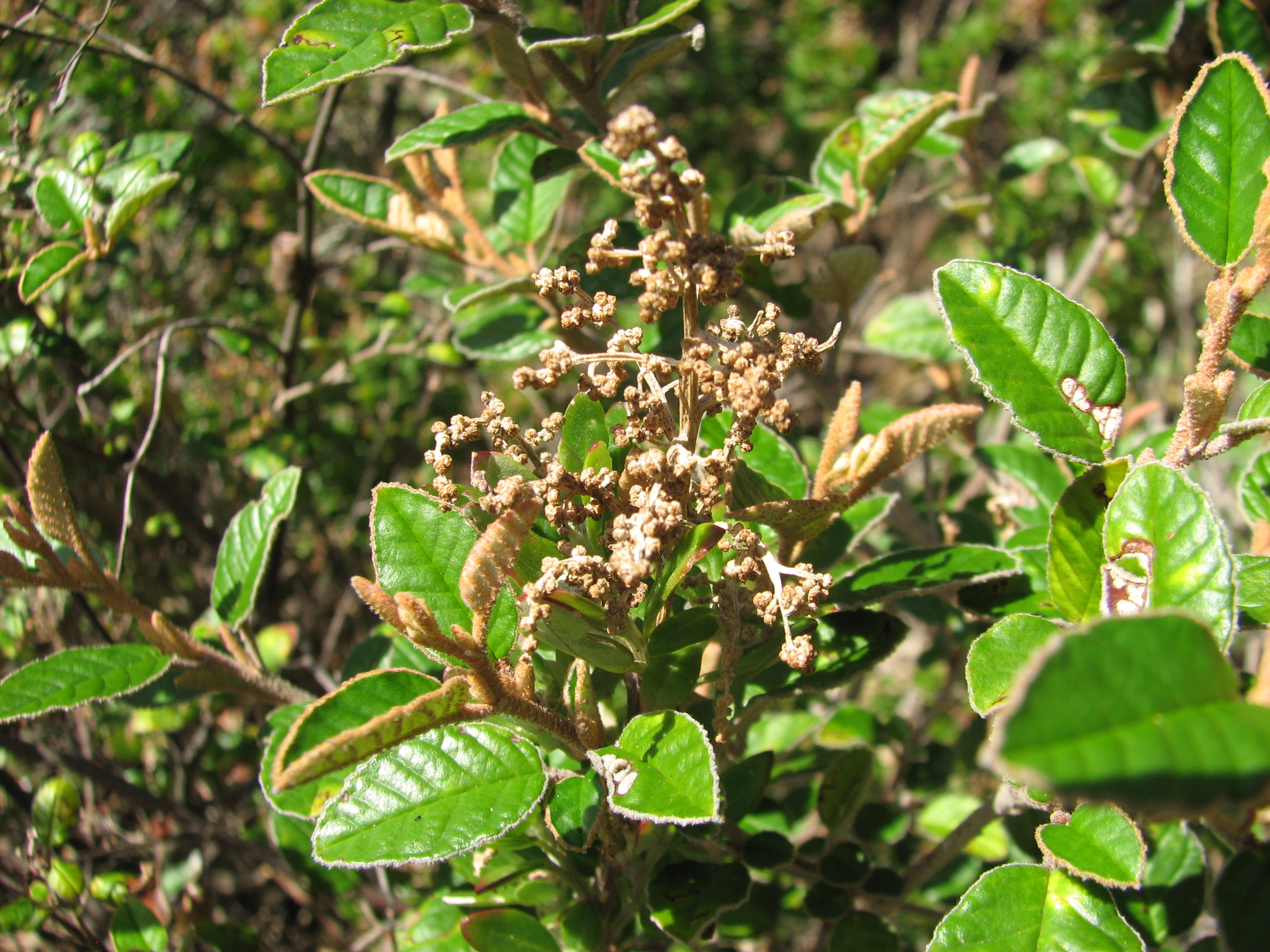
- Subsp. paralia at Cape Otway, Victoria

Scientific classification
- Kingdom: Plantae
- Clade: Tracheophytes
- Clade: Angiosperms
- Clade: Eudicots
- Clade: Rosids
- Order: Rosales
- Family: Rhamnaceae
- Genus: Pomaderris
- Species: P. paniculosa

Binomial name
- Pomaderris paniculosa F.Muell. ex Reissek

= Pomaderris paniculosa =

Species of plant

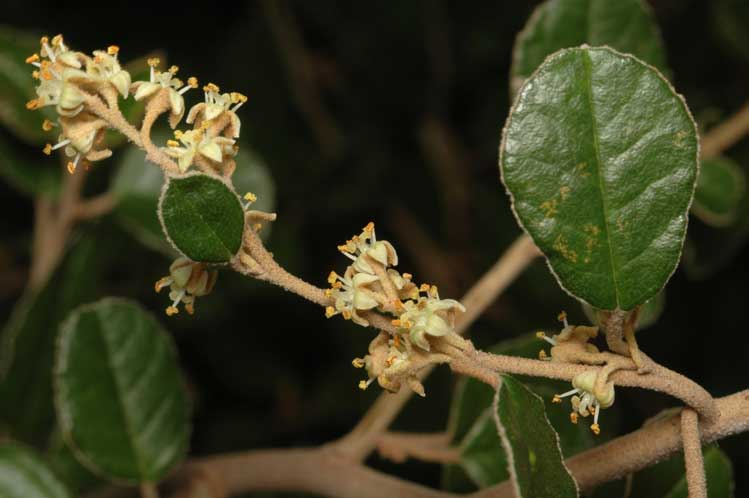
Flowers of subsp. paralia

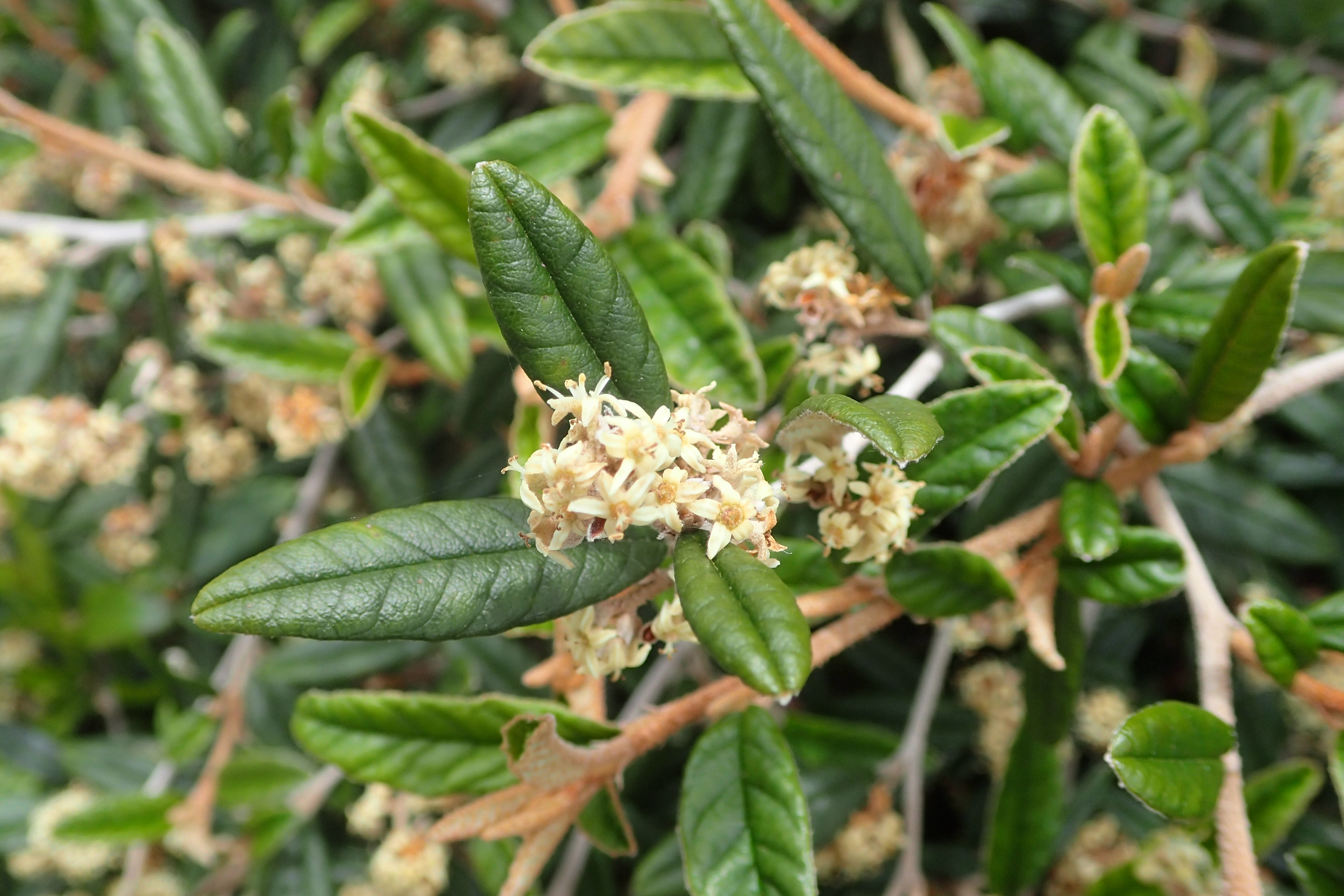
Subspecies novae-zelandiae in Auckland Botanic Gardens

Pomaderris paniculosa, commonly known as scurfy pomaderris, is a species of flowering plant in the family Rhamnaceae and is native to Australia and New Zealand. It is a shrub with hairy branchlets, round to elliptic or egg-shaped leaves with the narrower end towards the base and panicles of hairy, cream-coloured to greenish, sometimes crimson-tinged flowers.

== Description ==
Pomaderris paniculosa is a shrub that typically grows to a height of 1–3 m (3 ft 3 in – 9 ft 10 in), and has many branchlets with soft greyish to rust-coloured, star-shaped hairs. The leaves are round or elliptic to egg-shaped with the narrower end towards the base, the size depending on subspecies, with stipules 2–4 mm (0.079–0.157 in) long at the base, but that fall off as the leaf develops. The upper surface of the leaves is more or less glabrous, the lower surface densely covered with woolly white or rust-coloured, star-shaped hairs. The flowers are borne on the ends of branchlets or in leaf axils, usually in panicles, each flower on a short pedicel. The flowers are cream-coloured to greenish or tinged with crimson and densely covered with soft, star-shaped hairs. The size of the petal-like sepals varies with subspecies and there are no petals. Flowering occurs from July to November and the fuit is a capsule about 3 mm (0.12 in) long.

== Taxonomy ==
Pomaderris paniculosa was first formally described in 1858 by Siegfried Reissek in the journal Linnaea: Ein Journal für die Botanik in ihrem ganzen Umfange from an unpublished description by Ferdinand von Mueller. The specific epithet (paniculosa) means "paniculate".

In 1990, Neville Grant Walsh described two subspecies of P. paniculosa in the journal Muelleria, and the names are accepted by the Australian Plant Census:

- Pomaderris paniculosa subsp. paniculosa F.Muell. ex Reissek has leaves mostly 8–15 mm (0.31–0.59 in) long and 6–12 mm (0.24–0.47 in) wide, the sepals 1.5–2 mm (0.059–0.079 in) long and 1.0–1.3 mm (0.039–0.051 in) wide;
- Pomaderris paniculosa N.G.Walsh subsp. paralia has leaves mostly 15–50 mm (0.59–1.97 in) long and 10–25 mm (0.39–0.98 in) wide, the sepals 2.0–2.5 mm (0.079–0.098 in) long and about 1.5 mm (0.059 in) wide.

In 1961, Lucy Moore described Pomaderris oraria F.Muell. ex Reissek var. novae-zelandiae L.B.Moore in Harry Allan's Flora of New Zealand and in 1992, Walsh changed the name to Pomaderris paniculosa F.Muell. ex Reissek subsp. novae-zelandiae (L.B.Moore) N.G.Walsh in the New Zealand Journal of Botany. The name is accepted by the New Zealand Plant Conservation Network.

== Distribution and habitat ==
This pomaderris grows in Western Australia, South Australia, Victoria and Tasmania. In Western Australia, it grows along watercourse and near cliffs in the Esperance Plains biogeographic region, but subspecies paralia is only known from a single collection on Middle Island. In Victoria, subsp. paniculosa grows in shallow soil in mallee woodland in north-western areas of the state, subsp. paralia along cliffs and on dunes in near-coastal areas. In Tasmania, subsp. paralia is recorded from near-coastal sites along cliffs and near dunes in the north-east of the state, including on islands of the Furneaux Group and on King Island. The species is presumed extinct in New South Wales.

== Conservation status ==
In Western Australia, this species is listed as "not threatened" but subsp. paralia is listed as "Priority Two" by the Western Australian Government Department of Biodiversity, Conservation and Attractions, meaning that it is poorly known and from only one or a few locations. In Tasmania, subsp. paralia is listed as "rare" under the Tasmanian Government Threatened Species Protection Act 1995.
