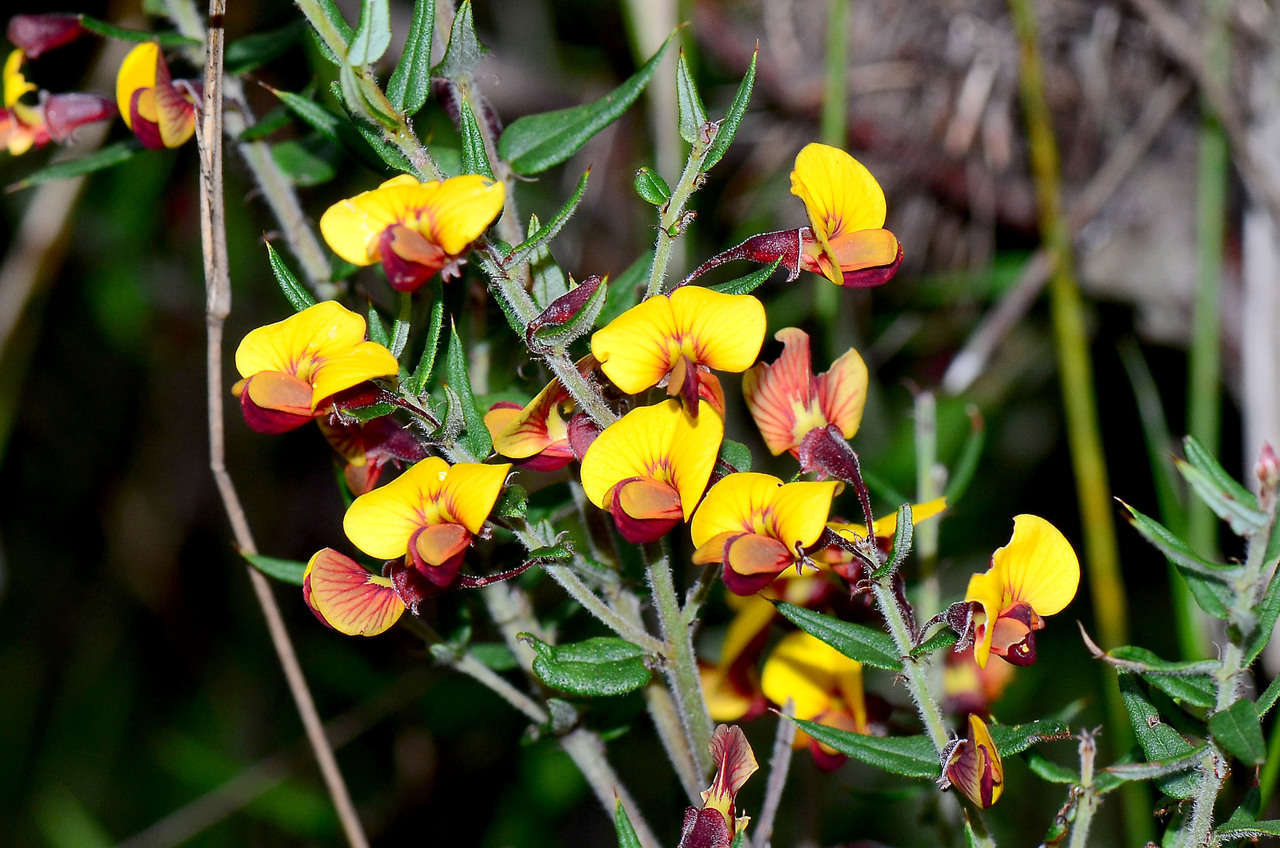
- Bossiaea cinerea in the Grampians

Scientific classification
- Kingdom: Plantae
- Clade: Embryophytes
- Clade: Tracheophytes
- Clade: Spermatophytes
- Clade: Angiosperms
- Clade: Eudicots
- Clade: Rosids
- Order: Fabales
- Family: Fabaceae
- Subfamily: Faboideae
- Genus: Bossiaea
- Species: B. cinerea

Binomial name
- Bossiaea cinerea R.Br.
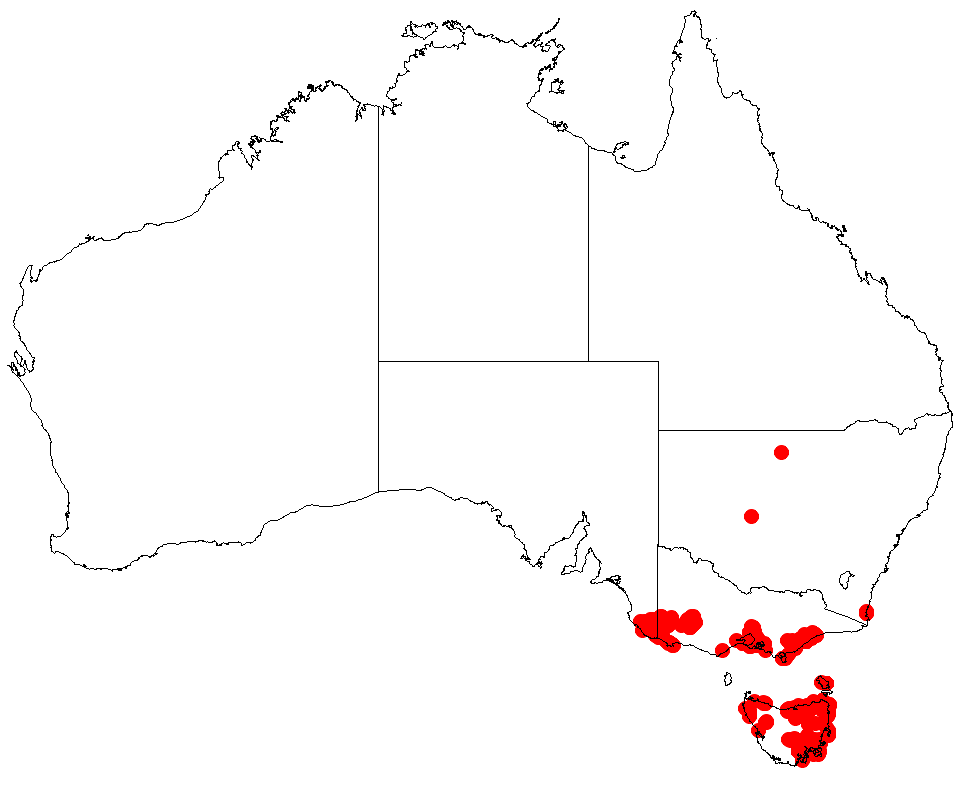
- Occurrence data from AVH

Synonyms
- Bossiaea cinerea R.Br. var. cinerea; Bossiaea cinerea var. tenuicaulis (Graham) J.M.Black; Bossiaea cordifolia Sweet; Bossiaea tenuicaulis Graham

= Bossiaea cinerea =

Showy bossiaea

Species of plant

Bossiaea cinerea, commonly known as showy bossiaea, is a species of flowering plant in the family Fabaceae and is endemic to south-eastern Australia. It is an erect or spreading shrub with trowel-shaped, triangular, egg-shaped or lance-shaped leaves with a sharply-pointed tip and golden yellow and red to purplish-brown flowers.

== Description ==
Bossiaea cinerea is an erect to spreading shrub that typically grows to a height of up to 1.5 m (4 ft 11 in) tall and has densely hairy stems. The leaves are more or less sessile, trowel-shaped, triangular, egg-shaped or lance-shaped with a sharply-pointed tip, 10–20 mm (0.39–0.79 in) long and 2–5 mm (0.079–0.197 in) wide with bristly stipules up to 2.5 mm (0.098 in) long at the base. The flowers are arranged singly in leaf axils along the branchlets, each flower 7–12 mm (0.28–0.47 in) long and borne on a pedicel 5–20 mm (0.20–0.79 in) long with crowded egg-shaped bracts and bracteoles equal to or less than 1 mm (0.039 in) long. The sepals are 3–5 mm (0.12–0.20 in) long and joined at the base with the upper lobes much broader than the lower ones. The standard petal is yellow with a red base, a darker colour on the back and up to 9 mm (0.35 in) long. The wings are yellow to orange with red or brownish-purple streaks and more than twice as long as the sepals, the wings and keel are shorter than the standard petal and brownish-purple or red. Flowering occurs from August to November and the fruit is an egg-shaped to oblong pod 19–20 mm (0.75–0.79 in) long.

== Taxonomy ==
Bossiaea cinerea was first formally described in 1812 by Robert Brown in William Aiton's Hortus Kewensis. The specific epithet (cinerea) means "ash-covered" or "grey".

== Distribution and habitat ==
Showy bossiaea grows in forest, woodland, coastal heath and scrub, south from Bega in New South Wales, through southern Victoria to far south-eastern South Australia. It is common and widespread in Tasmania.

== Use in horticulture ==
This bossiaea grows best in well drained soils but tolerates salty winds and dry conditions. It can be grown in full sun but prefers partial shade.

== Gallery ==
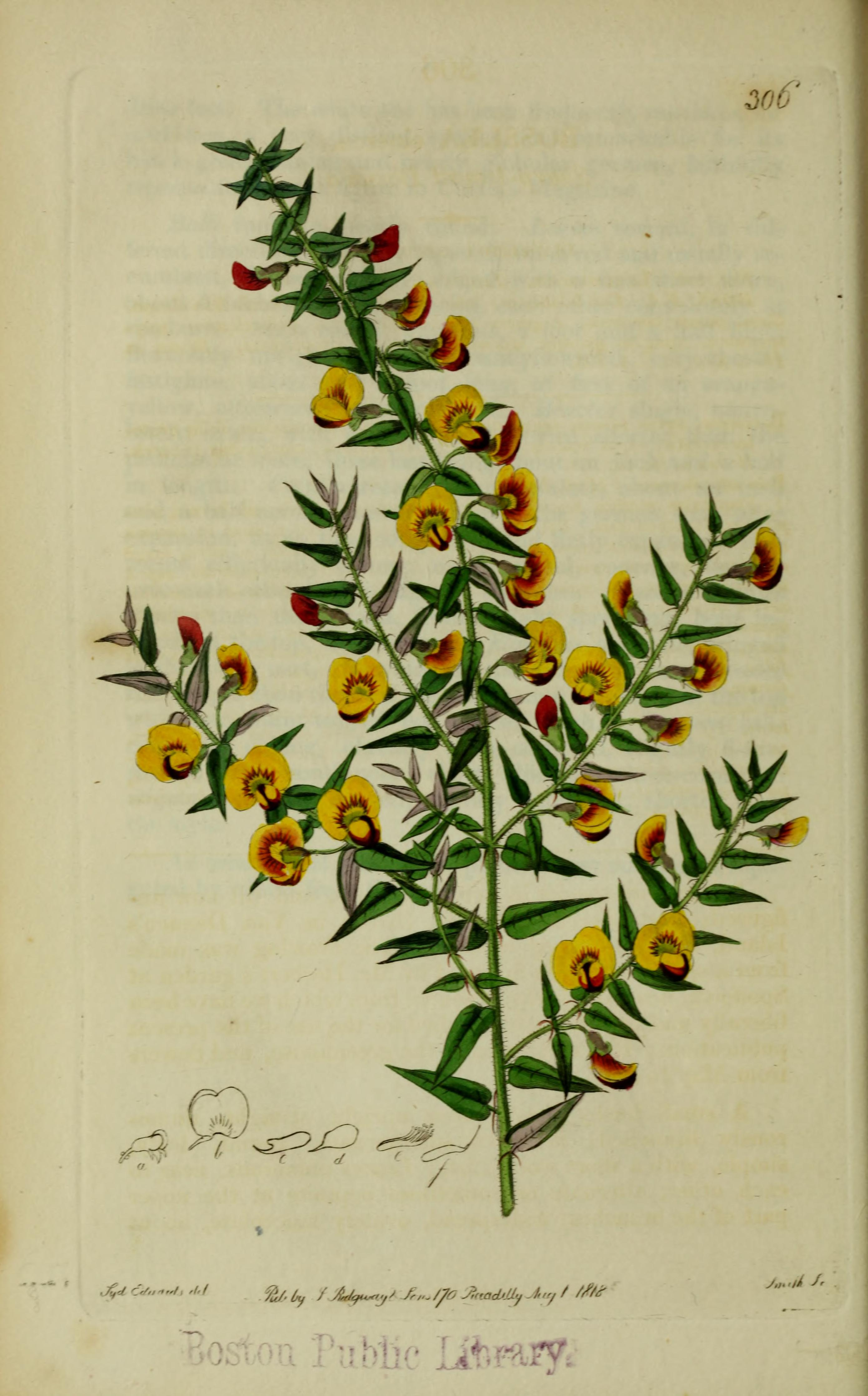
Illustraion of Bossiaea cinerea from the Botanical Register

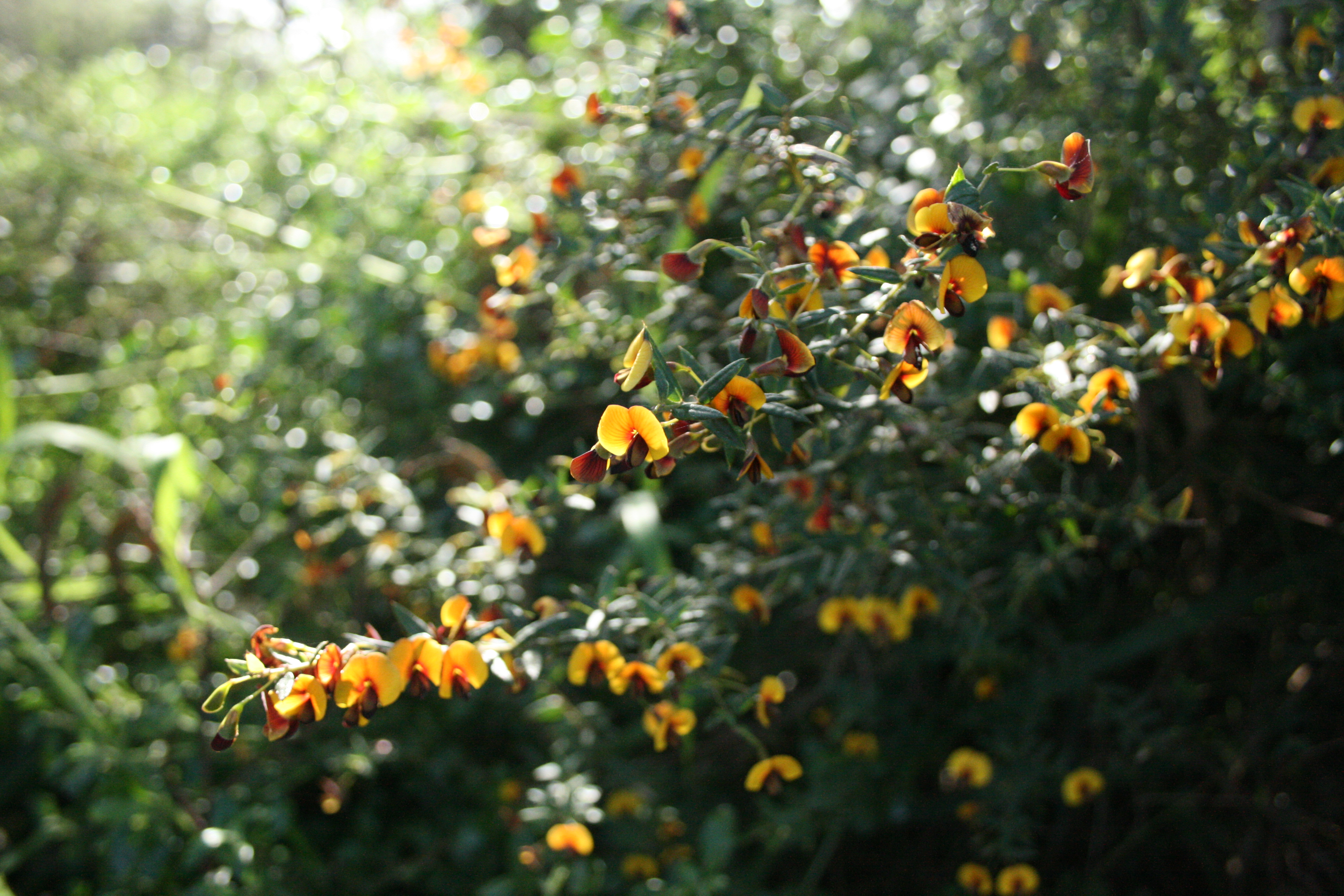
The numerous flowers growing singly along the stem

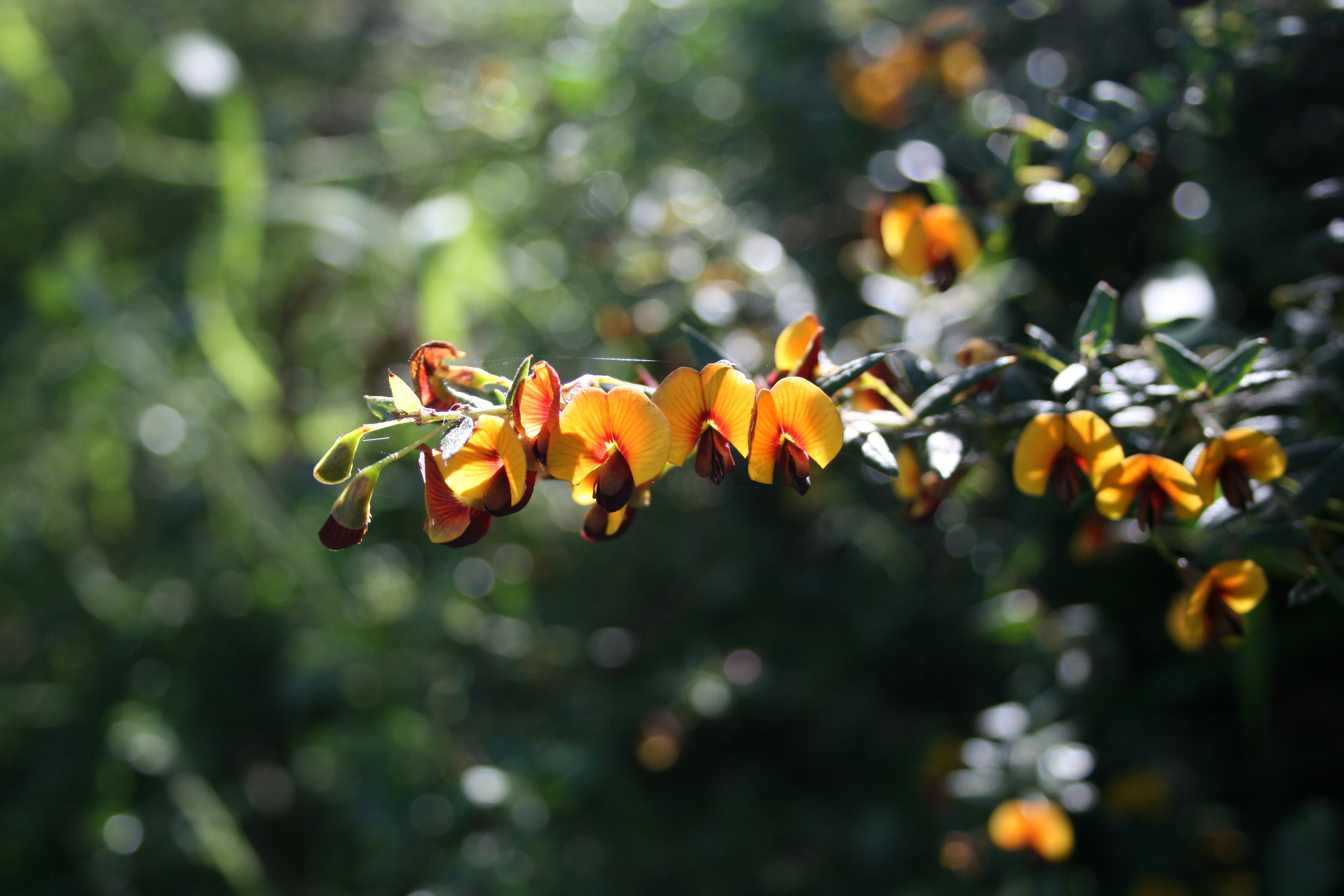
A closer-up view of the flowers of Bossiaea cinerea

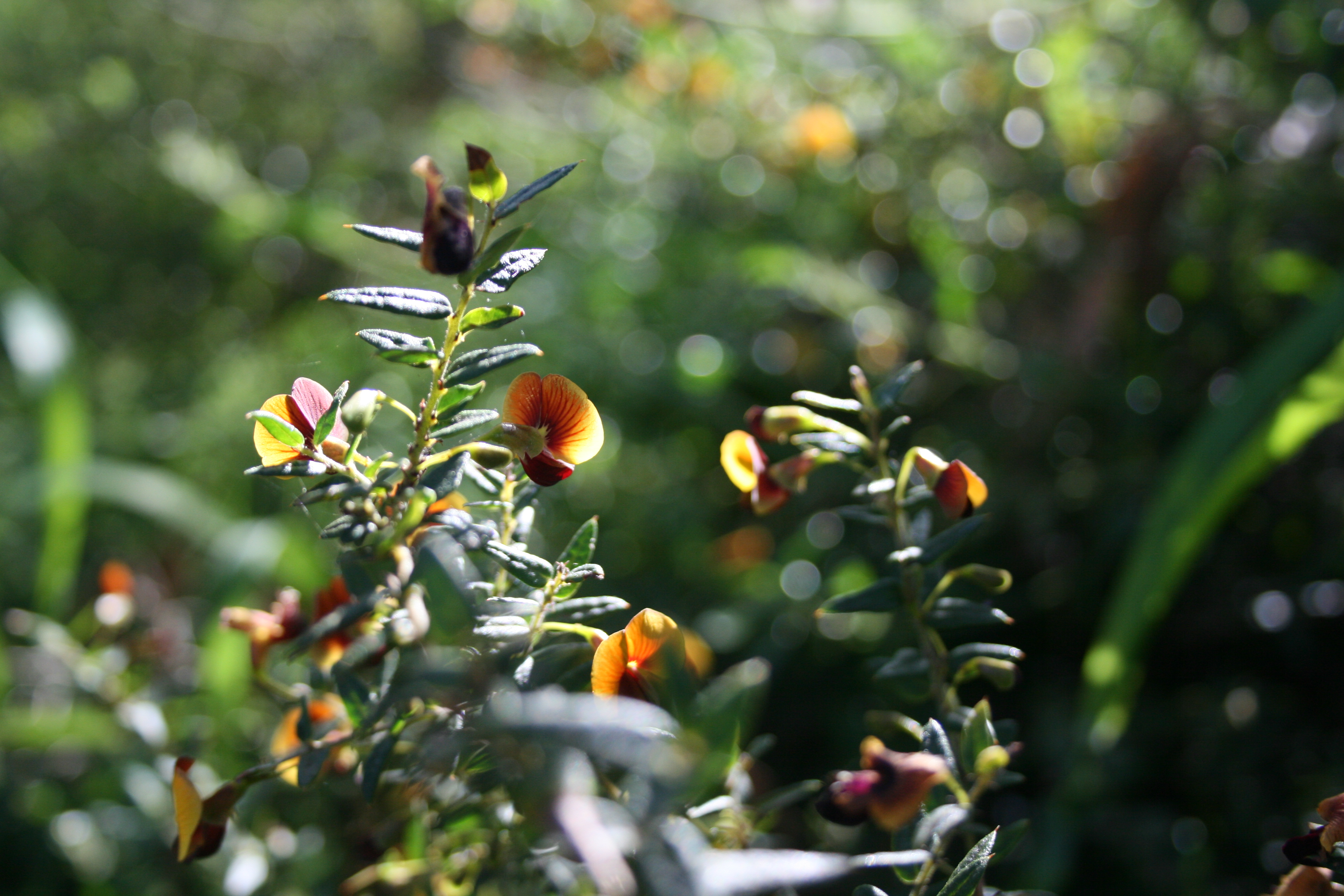
Image showing the back of flower and alternating leaf arrangement

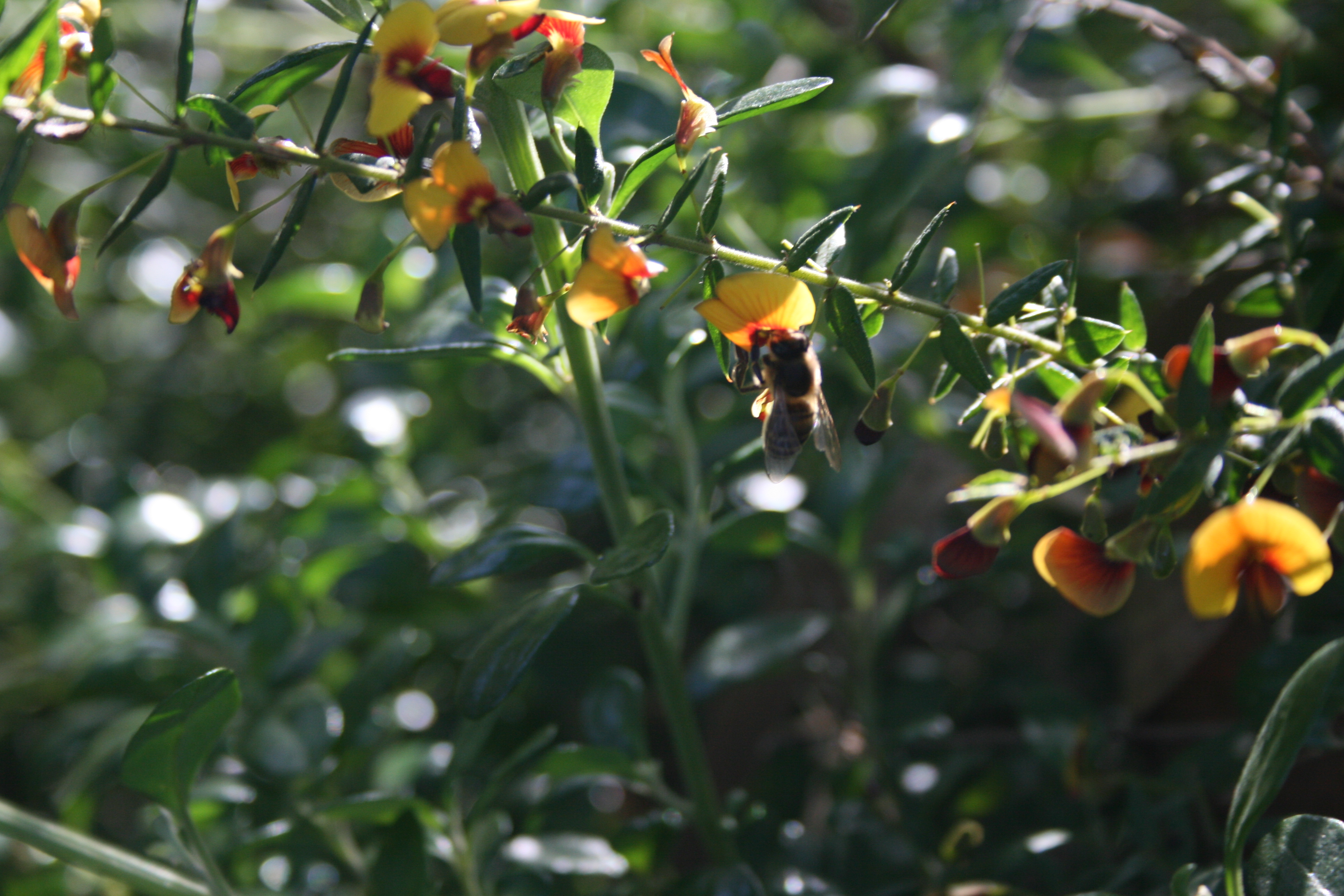
Pollination of Bossiaea cinerea by a bee (of unknown species)
