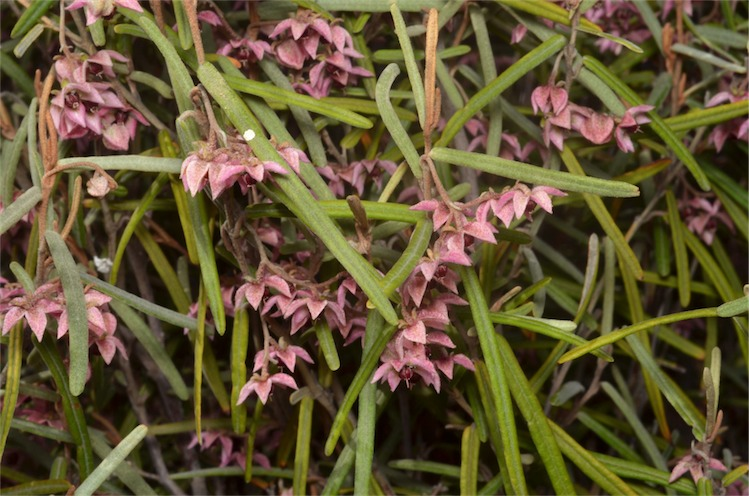
- Lasiopetalum baueri near Hopetoun, Victoria

Scientific classification
- Kingdom: Plantae
- Clade: Tracheophytes
- Clade: Angiosperms
- Clade: Eudicots
- Clade: Rosids
- Order: Malvales
- Family: Malvaceae
- Genus: Lasiopetalum
- Species: L. baueri

Binomial name
- Lasiopetalum baueri Steetz

= Lasiopetalum baueri =

Slender velvet bush

Species of plant

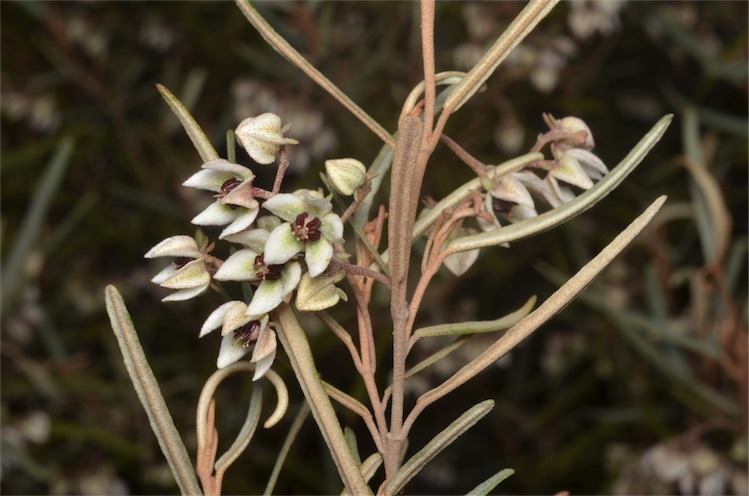
White form

Lasiopetalum baueri, commonly known as slender velvet bush, is a species of flowering plant in the family Malvaceae and is endemic to south-eastern Australia. It is a small, greyish shrub with more or less linear to narrowly oblong or narrowly elliptic leaves and groups of white or pink flowers.

== Description ==
Lasiopetalum baueri is a greyish, densely foliaged, spreading shrub 0.3–1.5 m (12–59 in) high and 1–2.5 m (3.3–8.2 ft) wide, its new growth prominently covered with red-brown hair. The leaves are linear to narrowly oblong or narrowly elliptic, 15–80 mm (0.59–3.15 in) long and 2–12 mm (0.079–0.472 in) wide on a petiole 2–4 mm (0.079–0.157 in) long, the margins flat or turned downwards. Hairy below, they become smooth above over time. The flowers are arranged in sometimes crowded groups of two to six with three bracteoles 1.4–3.0 mm (0.055–0.118 in) long at the base. The sepals are 3.4–5.7 mm (0.13–0.22 in) long and usually pink or white with a green base, the outer surface densely covered with star-shaped hairs. The petals are less than 1 mm (0.039 in) long and the anthers are reddish-brown and about 1.5 mm (0.059 in) long. Flowering occurs from September to November and the fruit is a densely hairy capsule 4–8 mm (0.16–0.31 in) in diameter.

== Taxonomy ==
Lasiopetalum baueri was first formally described in 1806 by Joachim Steetz in Lehmann's Plantae Preissianae from specimens collected by the botanical illustrator Ferdinand Bauer. The specific epithet (baueri) honours the collector of the type specimens.

== Distribution and habitat ==
Slender velvet bush is found in southern South Australia, central and western Victoria, and southwestern New South Wales where it is confined to the vicinity of Rankins Springs, and in the north-east of Tasmania. It grows in mallee communities or coastal cliffs on sandy soil over limestone, the top layer of soil often neutral to acidic, while the subsoil is highly alkaline.

== Conservation status ==
This lasiopetalum is listed as "rare" under the Tasmanian Government Threatened Species Protection Act 1995.

== Use in horticulture ==
Lasiopetalum baueri can be readily grown in dryer climates in well-drained soils and sunny aspects, and is used as a windbreak or hedge. It responds well to being pruned. It was introduced into cultivation in England in 1868. The dried flowers are long-lasting and have potential as a cut flower.
