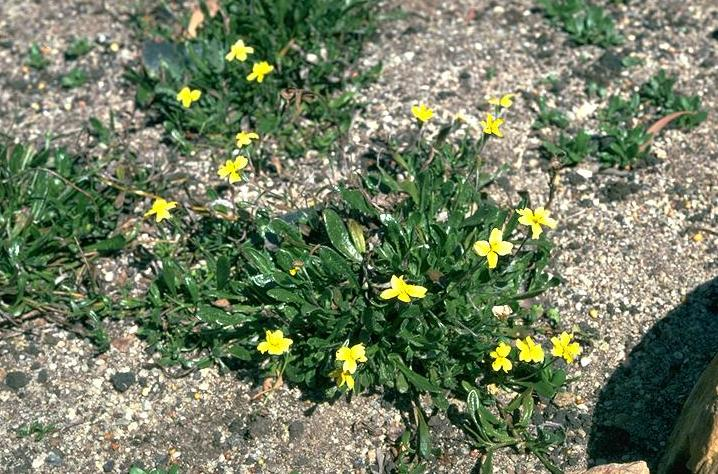
- In the ANBG

Scientific classification
- Kingdom: Plantae
- Clade: Tracheophytes
- Clade: Angiosperms
- Clade: Eudicots
- Clade: Asterids
- Order: Asterales
- Family: Goodeniaceae
- Genus: Goodenia
- Species: G. geniculata

Binomial name
- Goodenia geniculata R.Br.

Synonyms
- Goodenia geniculata R.Br. var. geniculata; Goodenia geniculata var. primulacea (Schltdl.) Benth.; Goodenia primulacea Schltdl.

= Goodenia geniculata =

Bent goodenia

Species of plant

Goodenia geniculata, commonly known as bent goodenia or native primrose, is a species of flowering plant in the family Goodeniaceae and is endemic to south-eastern Australia. It is a low-lying to ascending herb with linear to lance-shaped, often toothed leaves at the base of the plant and racemes of yellow flowers with hairy backs.

== Description ==
Goodenia geniculata is a low-lying to ascending, hairy herb with stems up to 25 cm (9.8 in) and often forming stolons. The leaves at the base of the plant are linear to lance-shaped with the narrower end towards the base, 30–100 mm (1.2–3.9 in) long and 3–10 mm (0.12–0.39 in) wide and often have toothed edges. The flowers are arranged in racemes up to 50 mm (2.0 in) long on a peduncle 15–50 mm (0.59–1.97 in) long with leaf-like bracts on the base or solitary in leaf axils. Each flower is on a pedicel 20–50 mm (0.79–1.97 in) long. The sepals are oblong, 4–5 mm (0.16–0.20 in) long, the corolla yellow, about 14–16 mm (0.55–0.63 in) long with hairs on the back. The lower lobes of the corolla are 7–8 mm (0.28–0.31 in) long with wings about 3 mm (0.12 in) wide. Flowering occurs from September to January and the fruit is an oval capsule about 10 mm (0.39 in) long and 7 mm (0.28 in) wide.

== Taxonomy and naming ==
Goodenia geniculata was first formally described in 1810 by Robert Brown in Prodromus Florae Novae Hollandiae et Insulae Van Diemen.

== Distribution and habitat ==
This goodenia grows in woodland, forest, grassland and scrub from the Eyre Peninsula in South Australia to Victoria, where it is often common, and in a few locations in Tasmania, where it is rare.

== Conservation status ==
In Tasmania, Goodenia geniculata is classified as "endangered" under the Tasmanian Government Threatened Species Protection Act 1995.
