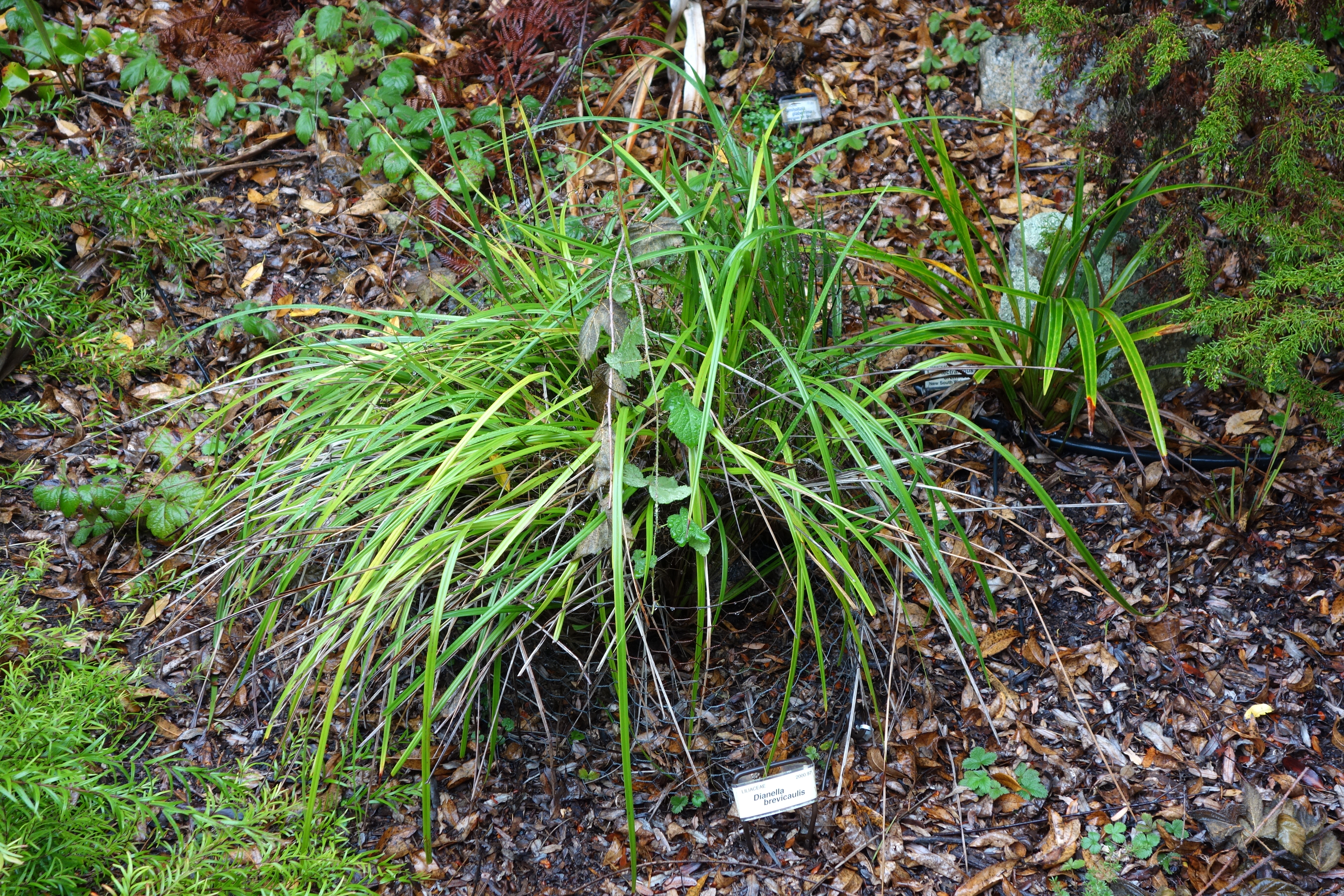

Scientific classification
- Kingdom: Plantae
- Clade: Tracheophytes
- Clade: Angiosperms
- Clade: Monocots
- Order: Asparagales
- Family: Asphodelaceae
- Subfamily: Hemerocallidoideae
- Genus: Dianella
- Species: D. brevicaulis

Binomial name
- Dianella brevicaulis (Ostenf.) G.W.Carr & P.F.Horsfall

Synonyms
- Dianella revoluta var. brevicaulis Ostenf.

= Dianella brevicaulis =

Species of flowering plant

Dianella brevicaulis, commonly known as the coast flax-lily, is a tufted, rhizomatous, perennial herb with fibrous roots and blue-purple flowers. Its long leaves form a soft, green tussock which conceal the flowering stems. It grows to 0.5 m in height and prefers sandy soils to quite far inland. It is native to southern Australia where it is usually found in coastal and subcoastal habitats and sandy inland ranges.
