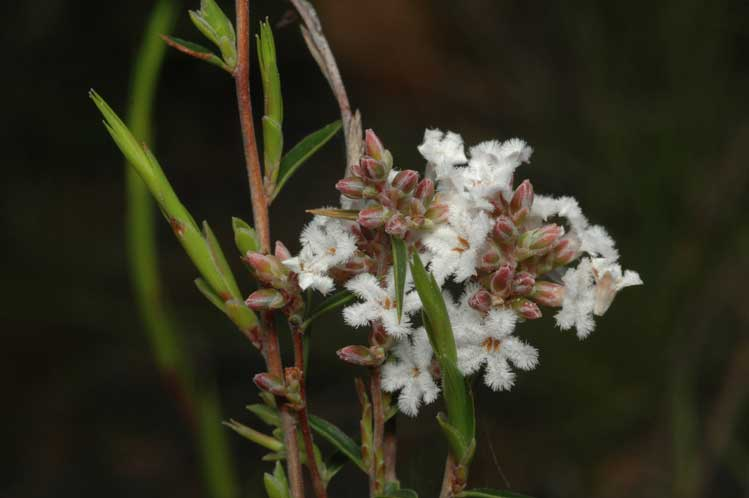
- In Kosciuszko National Park

Scientific classification
- Kingdom: Plantae
- Clade: Tracheophytes
- Clade: Angiosperms
- Clade: Eudicots
- Clade: Asterids
- Order: Ericales
- Family: Ericaceae
- Genus: Leucopogon
- Species: L. virgatus

Binomial name
- Leucopogon virgatus (Labill.) R.Br.
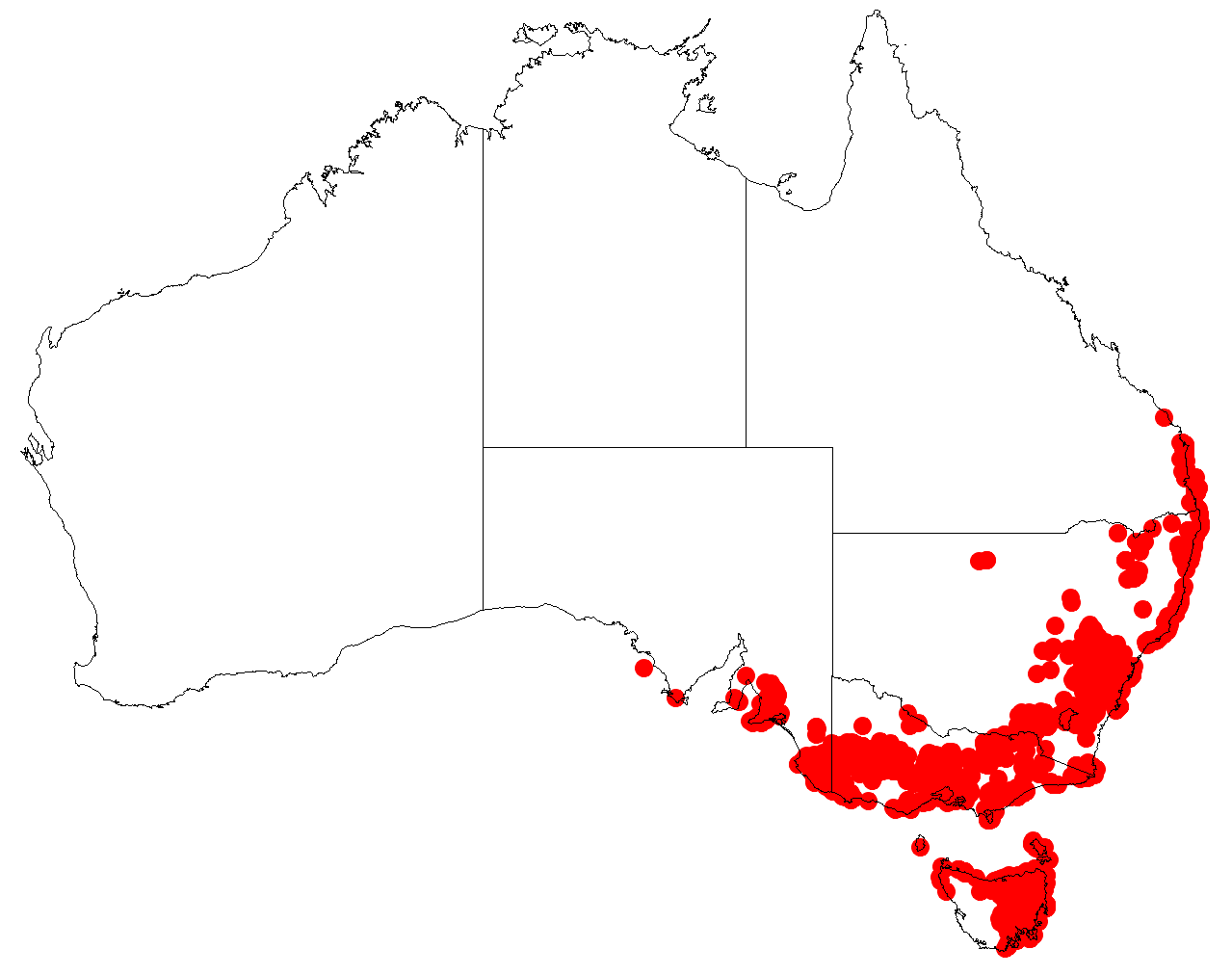
- Occurrence data from AVH

Synonyms
- Choristemon humilis H.B.Will.; Styphelia virgata Labill.

= Leucopogon virgatus =

Common beard-heath

Species of plant

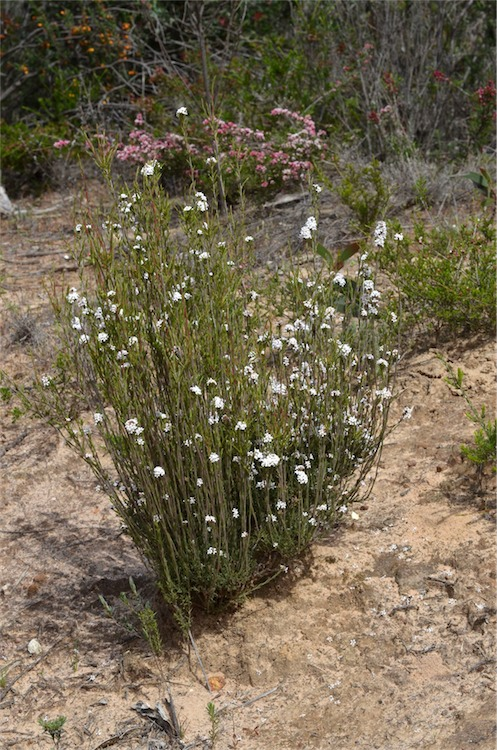
Habit of var. virgatus in the Grampians National Park

Leucopogon virgatus, commonly known as common beard-heath, is a species of flowering plant in the heath family Ericaceae and is endemic to south-eastern Australia. It is an erect to low-lying shrub with linear to narrowly lance-shaped or egg-shaped leaves, and erect clusters of three to seven white, tube-shaped flowers on the ends of branches and in upper leaf axils.

== Description ==
Leucopogon virgatus is an erect to low-lying shrub that typically grows to a height of 35–60 cm (14–24 in) high and has softly-hairy, redish brown branchlets. The leaves are more or less erect, linear to narrowly lance-shaped or egg-shaped, 2–25 mm (0.079–0.984 in) long and 0.9–5.0 mm (0.035–0.197 in) wide on a petiole up to 1 mm (0.039 in) long. Both sides of the leaves are glabrous, the same shade of green and there are three more or less parallel veins on the lower surface. The flowers are erect, arranged in groups of four to seven in spikes 5–10 mm (0.20–0.39 in) long on the ends of branchlets and in upper leaf axils. The bracteoles are egg-shaped, about 1 mm (0.039 in) long. The sepals are egg-shaped, 1.7–3.0 mm (0.067–0.118 in) long, and the petals white, 3.0–3.5 mm (0.12–0.14 in) long and joined at the base to form a tube, the petal lobes about the same length as the tube and densely bearded inside. Flowering occurs from July to December and the fruit is an oblong drupe about 2.3 mm (0.091 in) long.

== Taxonomy and naming ==
This species was first formally described in 1805 by Jacques Labillardière who gave it the name Styphelia virgata in his Novae Hollandiae Plantarum Specimen. In 1810, Robert Brown changed the name to Leucopogon virgatus in his Prodromus Florae Novae Hollandiae. The specific epithet (virgatus) means "twiggy" or "long and slender".

In 1868, George Bentham described two subspecies of L. virgatus in Flora Australiensis and the names are accepted by the Australian Plant Census, but not by the National Herbarium of New South Wales:

- Leucopogon virgatus var. brevifolius Benth. has leaves that are egg-shaped, 2–7 mm (0.079–0.276 in) long and not sharply pointed.
- Leucopogon virgatus (Labill.) R.Br.var. virgatus has leaves that are lance-shaped to narrowly lance-shaped, 7–25 mm (0.28–0.98 in) long and more or less sharply pointed.

== Distribution and habitat ==
Leucopogon virgatus var. virgatus grows in heath, woodland and forest on the coast and ranges up to an altitude of 600 m (2,000 ft) in south-eastern Queensland, New South Wales and the Australian Capital Territory, and is widespread throughout Victoria, south-eastern South Australia and Tasmania. Variety brevifolius grows in heath or heathy woodland in western Victoria, south-eastern South Australia and in forest and woodland in the Northern Midlands of Tasmania.

== Conservation status ==
Leucopogon virgatus var. brevifolius is listed as "rare" under the Tasmanian Government Threatened Species Protection Act 1995.
