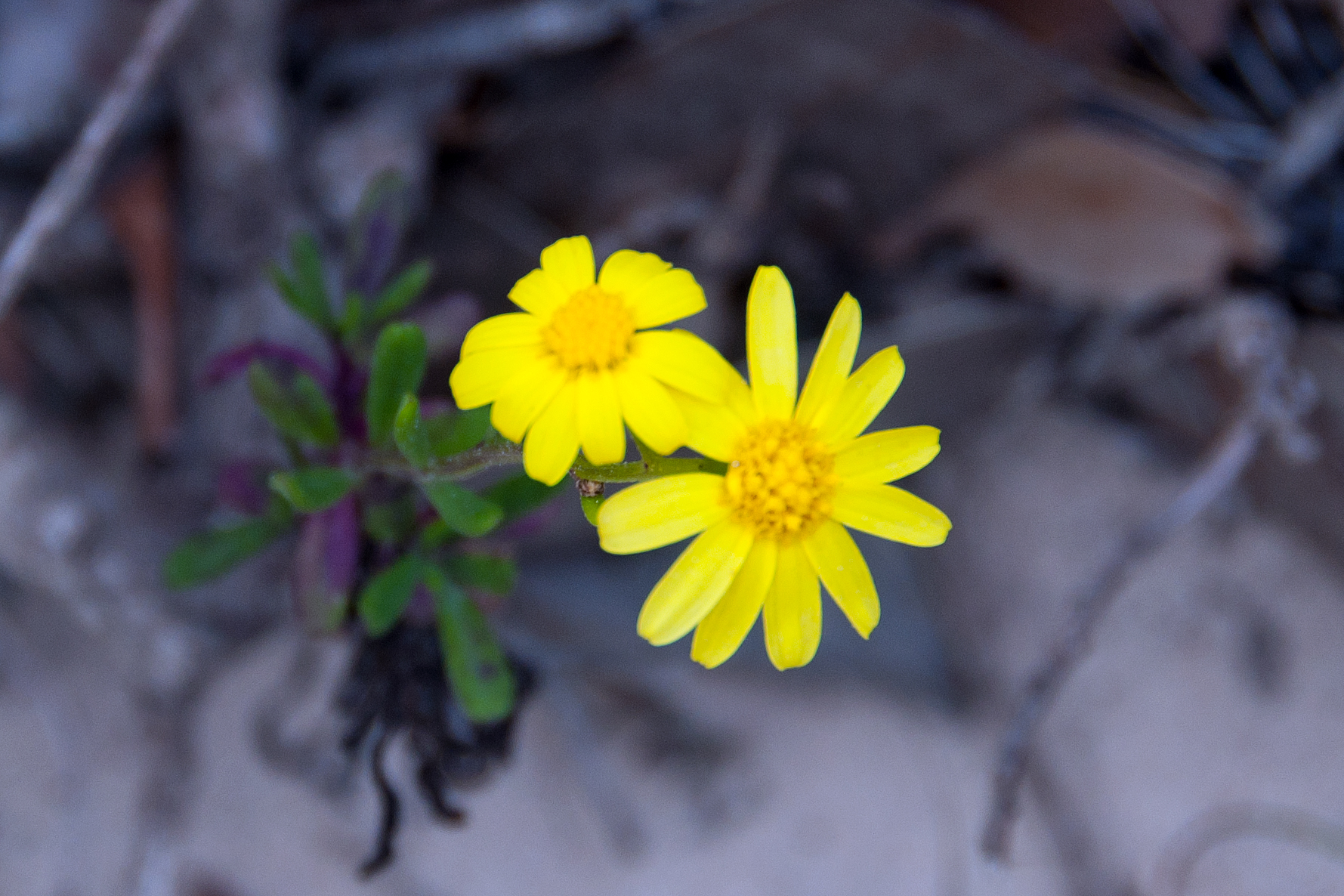

Scientific classification
- Kingdom: Plantae
- Clade: Tracheophytes
- Clade: Angiosperms
- Clade: Eudicots
- Clade: Asterids
- Order: Asterales
- Family: Asteraceae
- Genus: Senecio
- Species: S. pinnatifolius

Binomial name
- Senecio pinnatifolius A.Rich.

= Senecio pinnatifolius =

Species of herb

Senecio pinnatifolius is a species of herb native to Australia. Common names include coast groundsel, dune groundsel and variable groundsel.

== Description ==
It grows as an erect herb up to a metre in height, with yellow flowers.

== Taxonomy ==
The name Senecio pinnatifolius was first published by Achille Richard in 1834, but it was not immediately taken up. Instead, the species was long treated as the Australian component of S. lautus. In 1969, the Australian members of S. lautus were recognised as a distinct species, and the name S. pinnatifolius was reinstated.

The infraspecific taxonomy of the species is complicated and in a state of flux. A number of subspecies and varieties have been published, but these have long been recognised as not accurately reflecting variation within the species. In 2004 a thorough study of the species found ten variants, but did not publish names for them because further nomenclatural work was required for this. The following year a new revision, was published, in which the following varieties were recognised:

- S. pinnatifolius var. alpinus (Highland groundsel)
- S. pinnatifolius var. capillifolius (Fineleaf coast groundsel)
- S. pinnatifolius var. lanceolatus (Lanceleaf coast groundsel)
- S. pinnatifolius var. latilobus
- S. pinnatifolius var. laucocarpus
- S. pinnatifolius var. maritimus (Western coast groundsel)
- S. pinnatifolius var. pinnatifolius (Common coast groundsel)
- S. pinnatifolius var. serratus

== Distribution and habitat ==
It is native to Australia.
