= Peter McWhinney =

Australian professional golfer

Personal information
- Full name: Peter J. McWhinney
- Nationality: Australia
- Born: 25 July 1956 (age 70)
- Height: 1.88 m (6 ft 2 in)
- Weight: 102 kg (225 lb; 16.1 st)

Career
- Sport: Golf
- Status: Professional
- Former tour: Japan Golf Tour (1993-99)
- Professional wins: 2

Number of wins by tour
- Japan Golf Tour: 1
- PGA Tour of Australasia: 1

Best results in major championships
- Masters Tournament: DNP
- PGA Championship: DNP
- U.S. Open: DNP
- The Open Championship: CUT: 1988

Peter J. McWhinney (born 25 July 1956) is an Australian professional golfer.

== Professional career ==
McWhinney played in the 1983 Queensland PGA Championship. During the second round he shot a 67 (−5) to equal the course record. He was at 143 (−1), in a tie for second with Mike Ferguson, one back of Ossie Moore. After a third round 70 (−2), he took the 54-hole lead by three shots. He won the tournament.

McWhinney took the second round lead at the 1995 Australian Open.

McWhinney played on the Japan Golf Tour from 1993 to 1999, winning once.

== Professional wins (2) ==
=== PGA of Japan Tour wins (1) ===
No.	Date	Tournament	Winning score	Margin of victory	Runner-up
1	14 Apr 1996	Tsuruya Open	−12 (70-72-68-66=276)	1 stroke	(Australia) Peter Senior

=== PGA Tour of Australasia wins (1) ===
No.	Date	Tournament	Winning score	Margin of victory	Runner-up
1	12 Dec 1983	Queensland PGA Championship	−5 (76-67-70-70=283)	2 strokes	(Australia) Ossie Moore

== Results in major championships ==
Tournament	1988
The Open Championship	CUT

CUT = missed the halfway cut
Note: McWhinney only played in The Open Championship.
