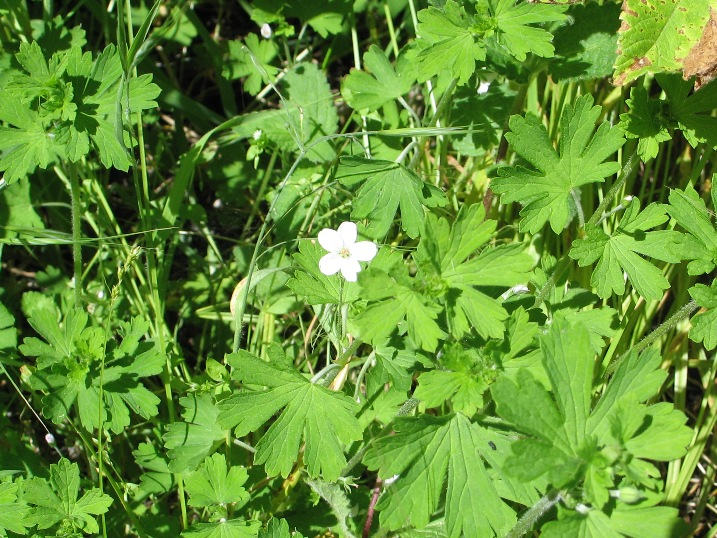

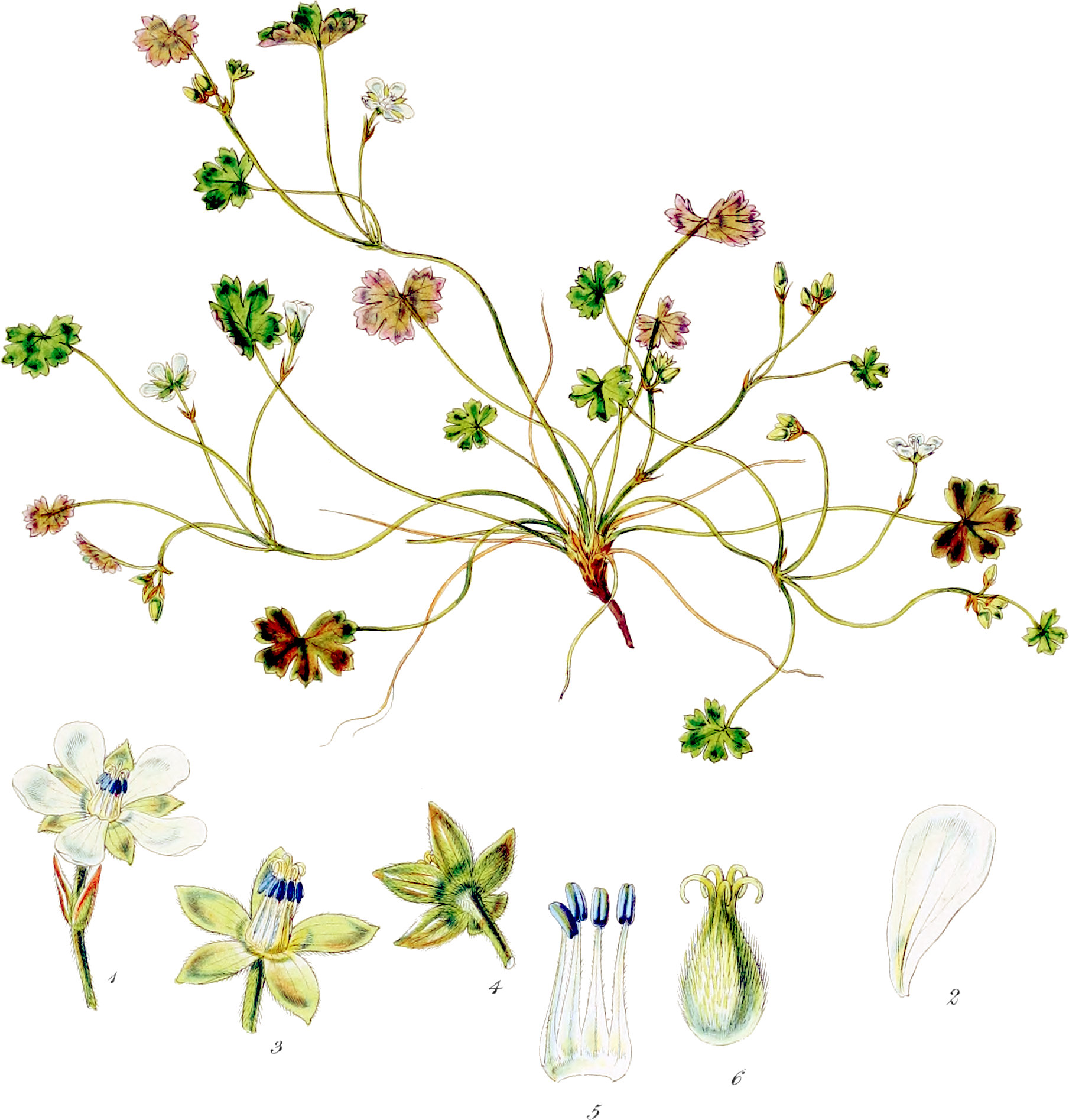
- as G. microphyllum

Scientific classification
- Kingdom: Plantae
- Clade: Tracheophytes
- Clade: Angiosperms
- Clade: Eudicots
- Clade: Rosids
- Order: Geraniales
- Family: Geraniaceae
- Genus: Geranium
- Species: G. potentilloides

Binomial name
- Geranium potentilloides L'Hér. ex DC.

Synonyms
- Geranium graniticola Carolin; Geranium microphyllum Hook.f. Geranium philonotum DC. Geranium pilosum var. potentilloides (L'Hér. ex DC.) Ewart; Geranium potentilloides var. abditum Carolin

= Geranium potentilloides =

Species of flowering plant

Geranium potentilloides, belongs to the family Geraniaceae, and is a small prostrate perennial herb that can grow up to 60cm high. The species is commonly referred to as Soft Cranesbill or Cinquefoil geranium.

== Description ==
Geranium potentilloides grows upwards and sideways to a height between 15-60cm, and can take root from the leaf nodes to form extensive clumps. The leaves of Geranium potentilloides are dark green or greyish-green in colour with a indented glossy surface. The underside of the leaves is often purplish. The leaves are round to kidney-shaped and divided into wedge-shapes segments, containing 5-7 lobes to a leaf. These lobes are narrow-obovate and toothed. The stem leaves are 1.5–3.5 cm long and to 5 cm wide and sit opposite on stem. The basal leaves are larger than the stem leaves and are not persistent in summer. The stem of this species has short, bristly reflexed hairs that are pressed towards the stem, which can also be found on the leaves. The roots of Geranium potentilloides consist of a thick multi-branched taproot system. Thee roots have the ability to nodes that come in contact with soil.

The flowers are a white to pale pink. The stalks that grow up to 7cm contain a singular flower, consisting of five green sepals and five white to pale pink petals with translucent veins. The petals are 5-6mm long and the tips may be notched or rounded. Each plant has both male and female organs and is usually pollinated by insects. Geranium potentilloides flower from around October to April in its native habitat.

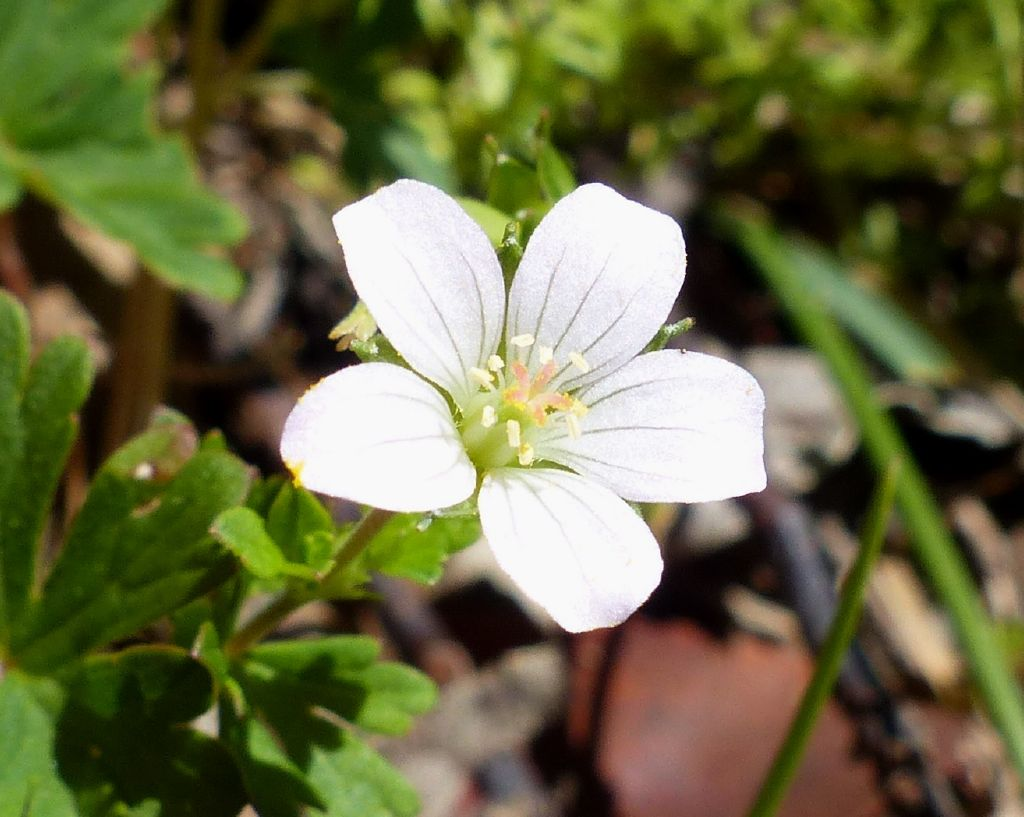
Geranium potentilloides flower

The seed of Geranium potentilloides is brown or black, and has a bristle that helps it to pierce the soil crust for germination. The fruit of the species is Fruit 12–14 mm long.

== Habitat and Distribution ==
Geranium potentilloides is native to the south-east of Australia, New Zealand and Indonesia. In Tasmania, Australia the species is found on eastern and central mountains up to 1000m. The species has also been introduced to coastal areas of central California, where it is known as Australian cranesbill and flowers from May to August.

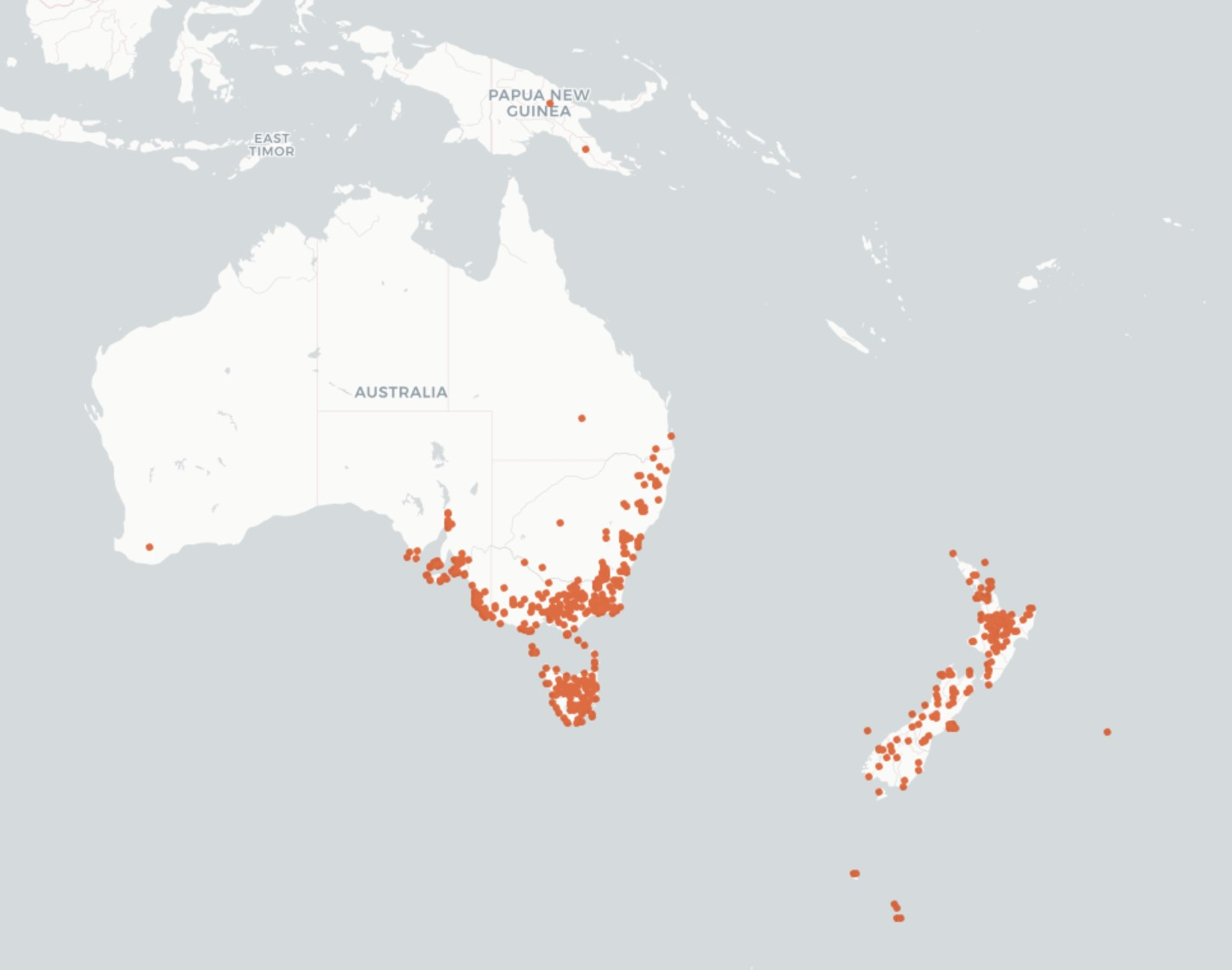
Distribution of Geranium potentilloides across Southern Hemisphere

The species is commonly found in woodlands, grasslands and moist forested areas and prefers damp, shady sites. Geranium potentilloides requires well drained moist soil and can survive in dryish basalt and clay soils and dolerite in Tasmania. The species can tolerate seasonal drought conditions but is intolerant of prolonged inundation.

== Uses ==
Geranium potentilloides has roots which are edible raw or cooked. The starchy roots are known to have been roasted for food by aboriginal Australian people, although it is likely that this was only the less bitter younger roots. Some Geranium species contain high levels of tannin and were used as an anti-diarrhoeal by aboriginal people.
