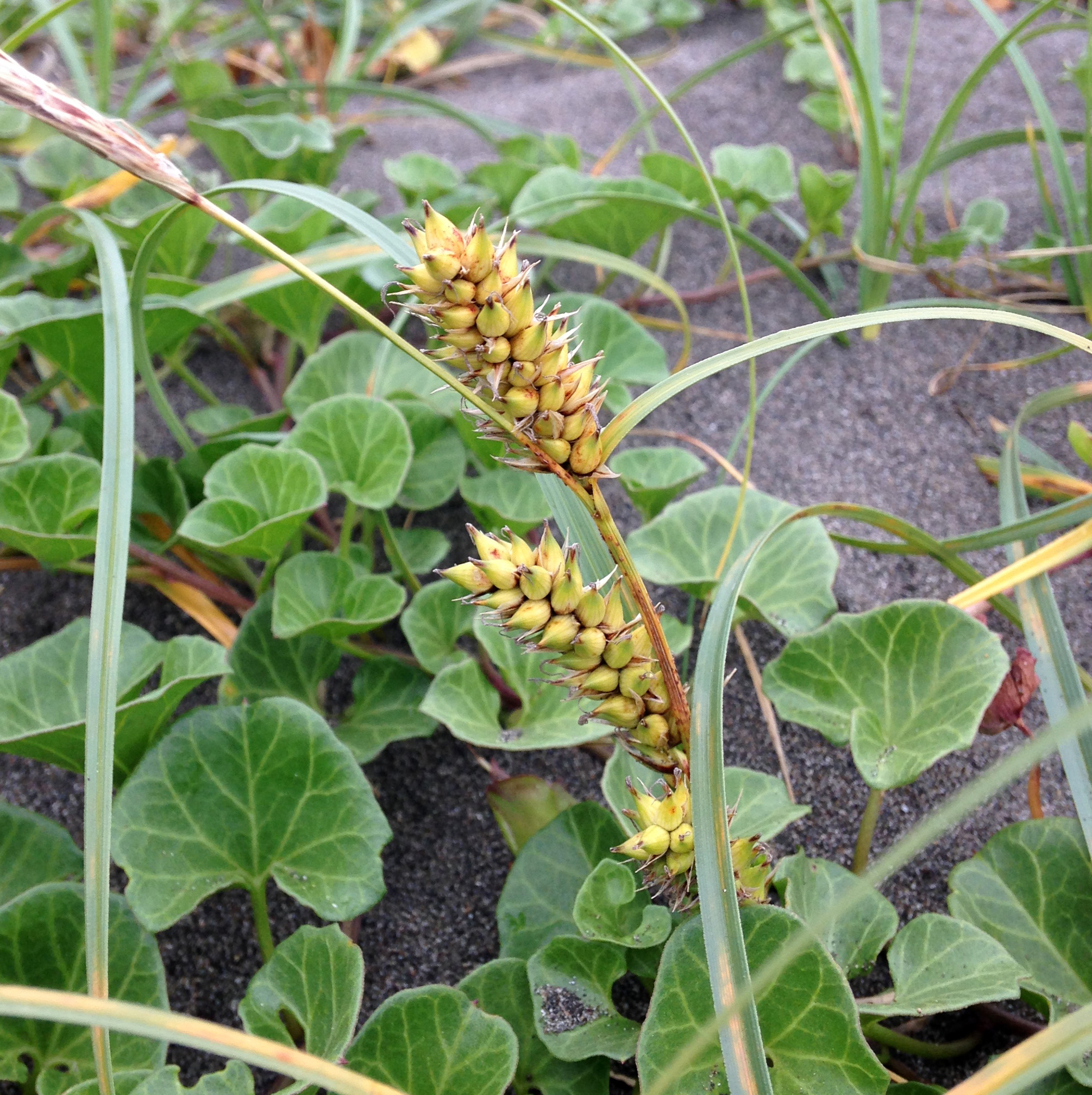

Scientific classification
- Kingdom: Plantae
- Clade: Tracheophytes
- Clade: Angiosperms
- Clade: Monocots
- Clade: Commelinids
- Order: Poales
- Family: Cyperaceae
- Genus: Carex
- Species: C. pumila

Binomial name
- Carex pumila Thunb. in Murray

= Carex pumila =

Strand sedge

Species of grass-like plant

Carex pumila, commonly known as strand sedge or spreading sedge, is a species of sedge of the family Cyperaceae.

== Description ==
The monoecious and rhizomatous perennial grass-like sedge has a tufted habit and typically grows to a height of 0.4 metres (1.3 ft). It blooms in summer usually between November and February in Australia producing brown flowers. The foliage is deep blue-green with coarse tufts, arising from a long creeping rhizome with a diameter of about 2 millimetres (0.08 in). The culms are usually buried in sand and are 5 to 30 centimetres (2.0 to 11.8 in) in length. The culms are terete, smooth, cream or light green in colour but almost completely enclosed by light cream brown to red-brown sheaths. The leaves are longer than the culms, up to 40 cm (15.7 in) in length and about 2 mm (0.08 in) in width. The leaves are channelled, rigid, curved and taper to a fine point t the end.

The seeds are oval shaped nuts and are 2 to 3 mm (0.08 to 0.12 in) in length.

== Taxonomy ==
The species was first formally described by the botanist Carl Peter Thunberg in 1784 as a part of Johan Andreas Murray's work Systema Vegetabilium. The name of this species is often misapplied to Carex bichenoviana.

== Distribution ==
The plant is widely distributed and is found in Australia, New Zealand, Lord Howe Island, Chile, China, Japan and Korea.

Mostly found along the coast in dune areas but occasionally around the sandy margins of coastal rivers and estuaries. Also sometimes as an urban lawn weed, mostly in coastal settlements.

It is found in coastal areas through much of temperate Australia from Queensland to Western Australia, including Tasmania. In Western Australia it is found on sand dunes in the Peel and South West regions where it grows in sandy soils.

== See also ==
- List of Carex species
