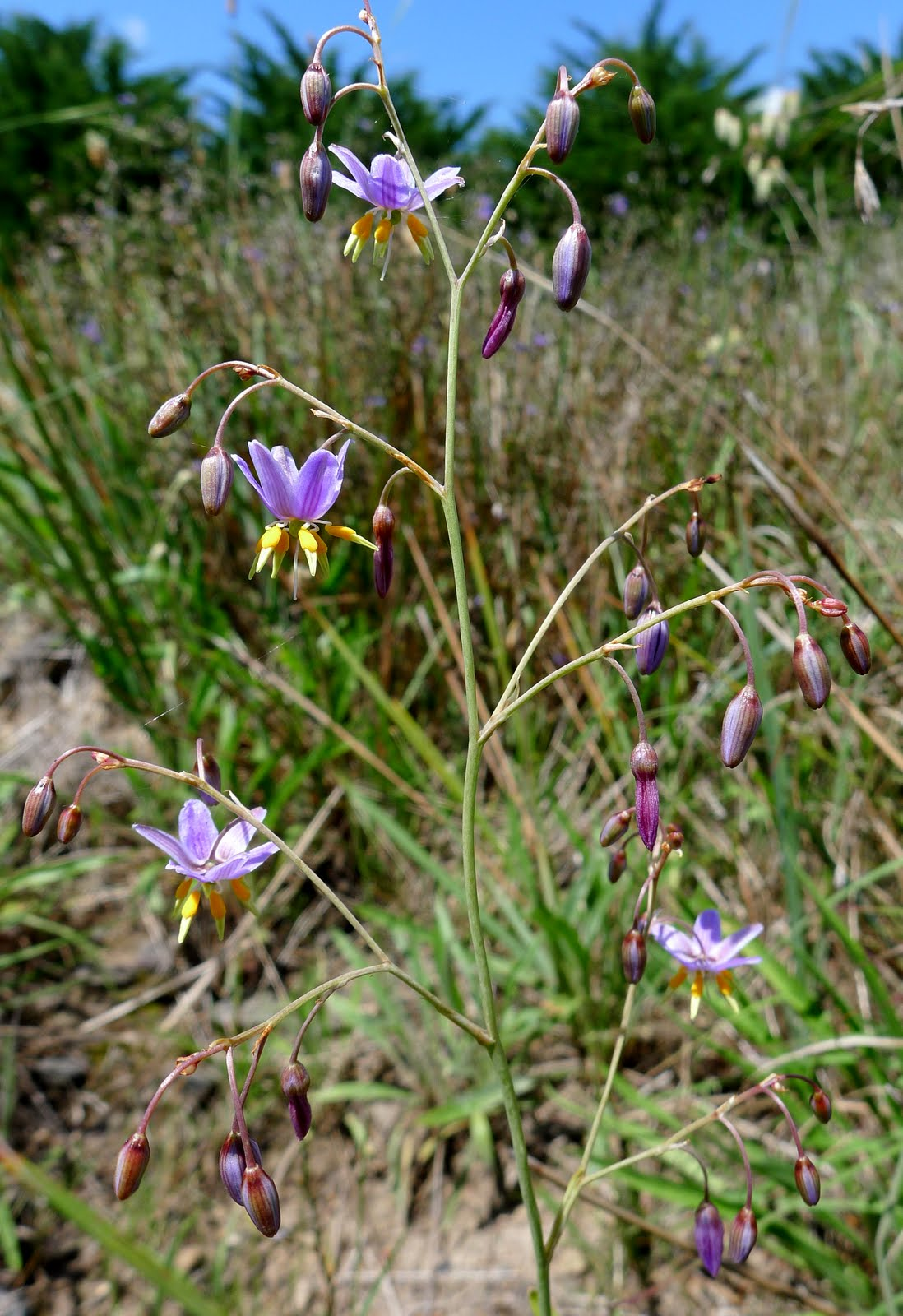

Scientific classification
- Kingdom: Plantae
- Clade: Tracheophytes
- Clade: Angiosperms
- Clade: Monocots
- Order: Asparagales
- Family: Asphodelaceae
- Subfamily: Hemerocallidoideae
- Genus: Dianella
- Species: D. amoena

Binomial name
- Dianella amoena G.W.Carr & P.F.Horsfall

= Dianella amoena =

Species of flowering plant

Dianella amoena, commonly known as the matted flax-lily, is an endangered, herbaceous, perennial plant endemic to Australia. It belongs to the family Asphodelaceae, subfamily Hemerocallidoideae. It has long grey-green leaves which grow in clumps from an underground rhizome, and displays blue-purple flowers in spring-summer, up to 90 cm in height. The common name Matted Flax-lily refers to its extensively rhizomatous nature, sometimes forming large mats up to 5m wide.

== Description ==
The slender, grey-green leaves of Dianella amoena have a V-shaped cross section, and generally exhibit peg-like projections or “teeth” along the leaf midrib and margins. It is clonal, meaning one plant or colony consists of multiple genetically identical ramets connected via a rhizome, and it is capable of both vegetative (asexual), and sexual reproduction. Shoots can appear up to 30 cm apart along rhizomes, but usually less. Inflorescences are 20–90 cm high and consist of a slender scape with fragrant flowers with blue-purple tepals and yellow stamens, which develop into dark blue-purple fruits following buzz pollination by native bees. It is partially summer deciduous when water stressed, but can flower from October to April in favourable conditions.

== Taxonomy ==
Dianella amoena was first described in 1995 by G.W Carr and P.F. Horsfall. Before being formally described, known populations were referred to as Dianella. sp. nov. (Nutfield). Its specific epithet comes from the Latin amoenus, meaning beautiful or pleasing. This is in reference to the plant's appearance, particularly the fragrant, colourful flowers which are in the upper size range for Dianella.

A phylogenetic study of Dianella taxa using combined chloroplast DNA and nuclear DNA placed Dianella amoena samples among some members of the Dianella longifolia species complex and Dianella tarda, Dianella porracea, and Dianella crinoides, suggesting these taxa to be its closer relatives in the genus. However, many nodes in the molecular phylogeny were poorly supported. Further molecular and morphological research was suggested to resolve relationships among these taxa, and no taxonomic changes were advised.

== Distribution and habitat ==
Dianella amoena inhabits grassland and grassy woodland ecosystems, often on volcanic soils. It has a sparse distribution across south-eastern Australia, mostly in the states of Victoria and Tasmania, with some records extending the range into New South Wales. The species exists in small fragments of its original range in roadsides, railways, and urban nature reserves, often in degraded habitats. Recruitment is believed to be non-existent, but it is long-lived and persists in remnant clonal patches.

== Conservation ==
Dianella amoena is listed as "Endangered" under the Environment Protection and Biodiversity Conservation Act 1999 federal legislation. It is listed as "Critically Endangered" under the Flora and Fauna Guarantee Act 1988 state legislation in Victoria, and "Rare" under the Threatened Species Protection Act 1995 state legislation in Tasmania. The main threats to the species are weed invasion, habitat disturbance, mowing and grazing. A recovery plan was prepared in 2010, and estimated 1,400 plants remained over 120 locations, however the plan considered Dianella amoena endemic to Victoria as records outside of Victoria were limited at the time. A more recent population estimate considering the entire range of the species is unavailable. The extensively rhizomatous nature of the species makes accurate population estimation difficult, as genetically distinct plants cannot be easily distinguished. The species has also been subject to numerous translocations, both for conservation and development mitigation purposes, which may have impacted total population size.

== Uses ==
Some plants in the Dianella genus have edible fruits, while others are considered poisonous. Aboriginal peoples ate the fruits of some Dianella species historically, and used the leaves for weaving. Information regarding Dianella amoena specifically is unavailable as it has only been formally recognised since 1995.
