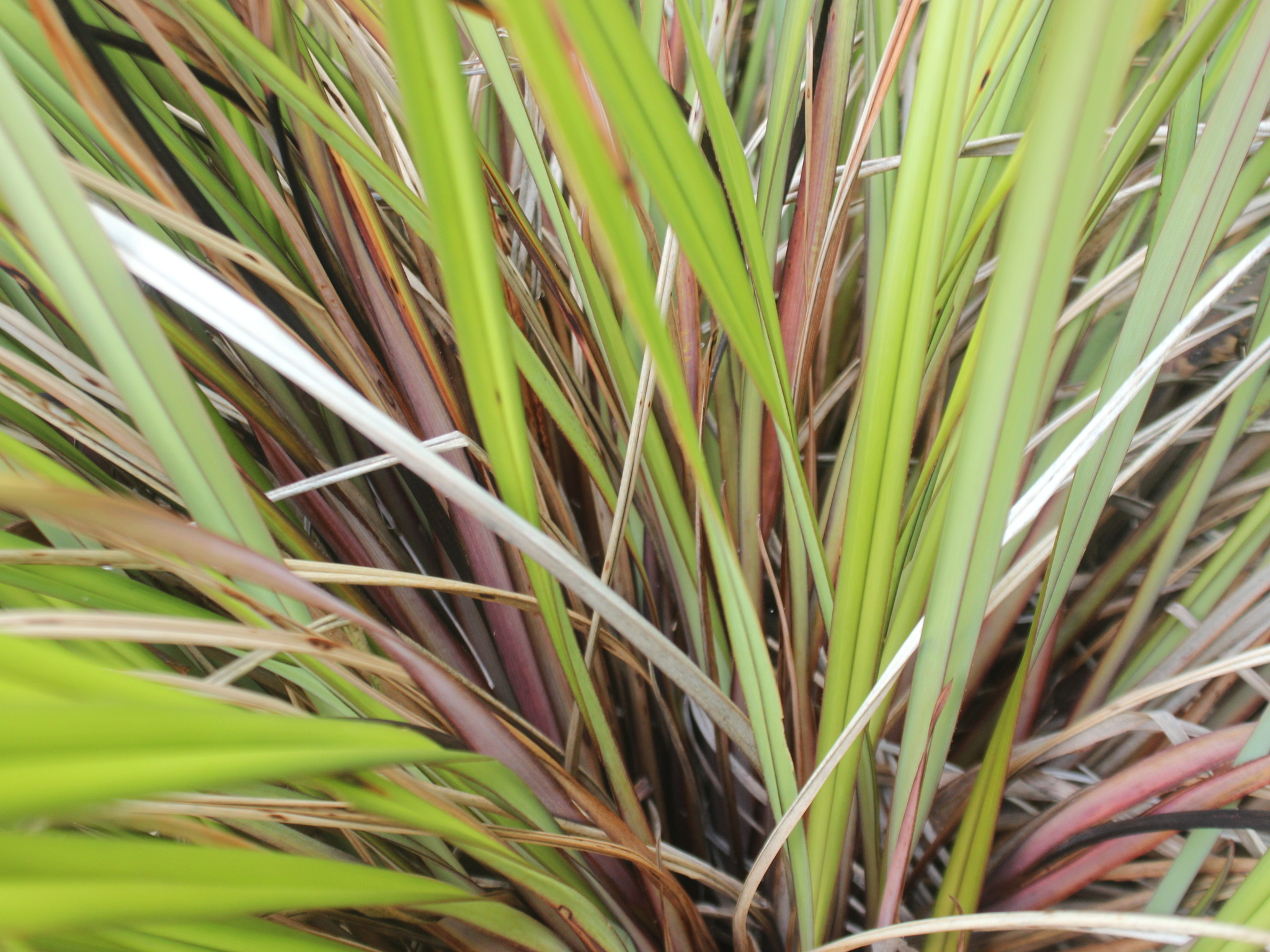
- Pink leaf bases of Dianella haematica

Conservation status
- Not Threatened (NZ TCS)

Scientific classification
- Kingdom: Plantae
- Clade: Tracheophytes
- Clade: Angiosperms
- Clade: Monocots
- Order: Asparagales
- Family: Asphodelaceae
- Subfamily: Hemerocallidoideae
- Genus: Dianella
- Species: D. haematica

Binomial name
- Dianella haematica Heenan & de Lange

= Dianella haematica =

Species of flowering plant

Dianella haematica, commonly known as swamp blueberry, swamp dianella, and swamp ink berry, is a species of flowering plant in the family Asphodelaceae. It is endemic to New Zealand; its range mainly covers the northern North Island. It grows in coastal to lowland wetland environments. The species was first described in 2007 by Peter de Lange and Peter Brian Heenan. A pernnial herb, the species has distinct blood red or pink rhizomes and leaf bases. The conservation status of D. haematica was assessed by the New Zealand Threat Classification System in 2023 as "Not Threatened".

== Description ==
Dianella haaematica is a species of perennial herb in the family Asphodelaceae and the subfamily Hemerocallidoideae. It is evergreen, dense, tussock-like, with clumps of rhizomes up to 20 mm long. Leaves can reach 1–2 metres (3 feet 3 inches – 6 feet 7 inches) long and 18–25 mm (0.71–0.98 in) wide. They are green to dull dark green in colour. The laminae (leaf blades) are smooth and glossy. The leaf bases are blood-red, red-maroon or pink in colour.

The inflorescences (flower clusters) are 1–2 m (3 ft 3 in – 6 ft 7 in) long. The panicles are 400–700 mm (16–28 in) long. The pedicels are 9–20 mm long. Flowers are 10–11 mm in diameter. The sepals are 4.8–5.5 × 1.9–2.0 mm long. The petals are 4.1–4.2 × 2.9–3.0 mm long and white in colour. The ovaries are about 1.3–1.5 × 1.3 mm, green, and the styles are 1.4–1.5 mm long. The glossy berries are 8–20 × 7–10 mm long, initially coloured grey-white or dull then ripening to strong violet-blue colour. The typically violet-blue colour of the berries of the Dianella genus is attributed to the anthocyanins and pigments in them. D. haematica's seeds are 1.8–2.5 × 2.3–3.2 mm long.

== Taxonomy ==
The Dianella genus was first established in 1789 by the French naturalist Jean-Baptiste Lamarck. D. haematica was first described in 2007 by Peter de Lange and Peter Brian Heenan. There are forty species of the Dianella genus currently accepted by the Plants of the World Online taxonomic database. This genus is widespread and is found in several countries in Africa, Asia, and Oceania. The genus Dianella is closely related to Thelionema and Herpolirion.

=== Etymology ===
The etymology (word origin) of D. haematica's genus name, Dianella, refers to the Roman goddess of the chase Diana. The specific epithet (second part of the scientific name), haematica, refers to the typically bright red colour at the bases of the leaves. The species is commonly known as swamp blueberry, swamp dianella, and swamp ink berry.

== Distribution ==
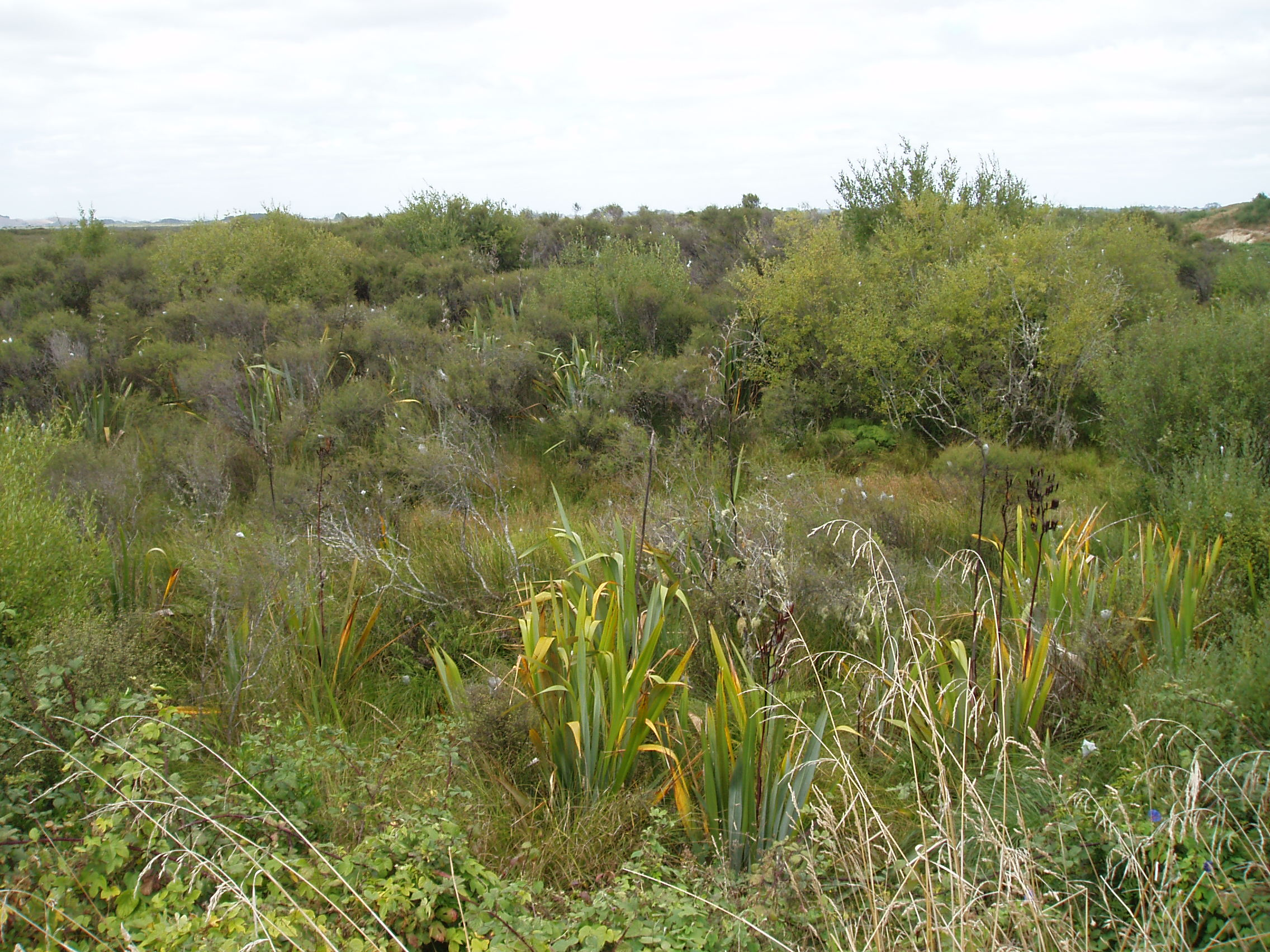
Habitat of Dianella haematica

Dianella haematica is endemic to New Zealand. It is only found in the northern North Island, and also the offshore Great Barrier Island. In the North Island, it occurs from the Northland Region south to the Mamaku Plateau or near the near town of Te Awamutu. D. haematica is most common in Waikato where it associates with peat swamps and other wetland habitats. The conservation status of D. haematica was assessed by the New Zealand Threat Classification System in 2023 as "Not Threatened".

=== Habitat ===
Dianella haematica is found in coastal to lowland environments, commonly association with peat boglands. The species has a high tolerance for a variety of wetlands and other acidic soil environments. Some individuals are found in highly acidic, restiad-dominated peat boglands in the Waikato Region.

== Ecology ==
Dianella haematica's pollination strategy is unknown, but its relative D. tasminca has a cleistogamy pollination strategy, and the flowers are capable of self-pollinating. The berries of D. haematica are dispersed by fruit-eating animals (frugivores).

== Works cited ==
Books

- Gledhill, David (2008). The Names of Plants. Cambridge, United Kingdom: Cambridge University Press. ISBN 978-0-521-68553-5.
- Metcalf, Lawrie (2009). Know Your New Zealand Native Plants. Auckland, New Zealand: White Cloud Books. ISBN 978-1-77694-036-3.

Journals

- Bloor, Stephen J (2001). "Deep Blue Anthocyanins from Blue Dianella Berries". Phytochemistry. 58 (6): 923–927. doi:10.1016/S0031-9422(01)00343-0.
- Devey, Dion; Leitch, Ilia; Pires, Chris; Pillon, Yohan; Chase, Mark (2006). "Systematics of Xanthorrhoeaceae Sensu Lato, with an Emphasis on Bulbine". Aliso. 22 (1): 345–351. doi:10.5642/aliso.20062201.28.
- Heenan, P. B.; De Lange, P. J. (2007). "Two new species of Dianella (Hemerocallidaceae) from New Zealand". New Zealand Journal of Botany. 45 (1): 269–285. doi:10.1080/00288250709509714. ISSN 0028-825X.
- Muscat, Karen M.; Ladiges, Pauline Y.; Bayly, Michael J. (2019). "Molecular phylogenetic relationships reveal taxonomic and biogeographic clades in Dianella (flax lilies; Asphodelaceae, Hemerocallidoideae)". Systematics and Biodiversity. 17 (3): 308–329. doi:10.1080/14772000.2019.1607617. ISSN 1477-2000.

Websites

- De Lange, Peter (2026). "Dianella haematica". New Zealand Plant Conservation Network. Archived from the original on 5 August 2025.
- "Dianella Lam. ex Juss". Plants of the World Online. Archived from the original on 17 December 2024 – via Royal Botanic Gardens, Kew.
