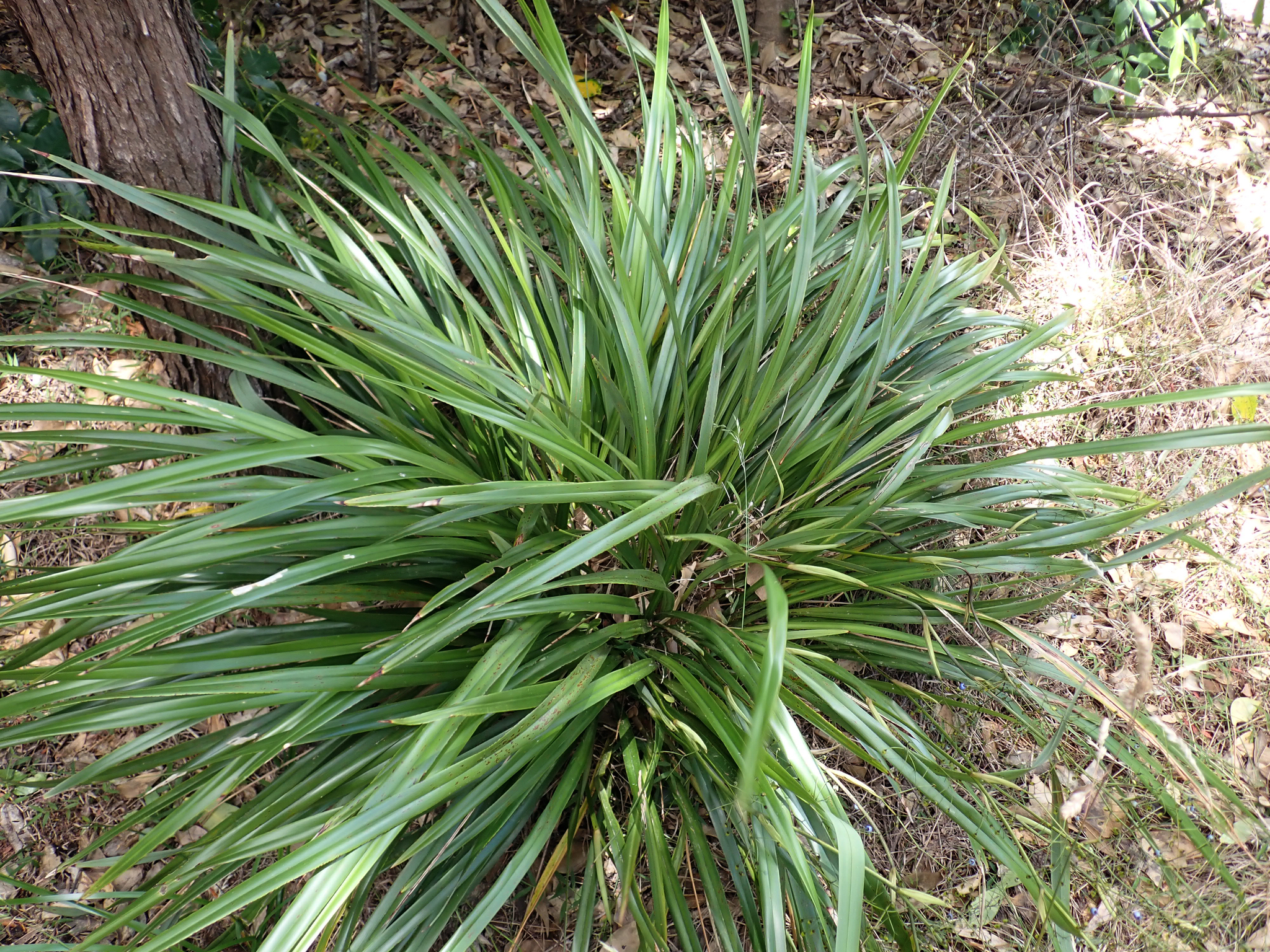
- A mature Dianella latissima specimen

Conservation status
- Not Threatened (NZ TCS)

Scientific classification
- Kingdom: Plantae
- Clade: Tracheophytes
- Clade: Angiosperms
- Clade: Monocots
- Order: Asparagales
- Family: Asphodelaceae
- Subfamily: Hemerocallidoideae
- Genus: Dianella
- Species: D. latissima

Binomial name
- Dianella latissima Heenan & de Lange

= Dianella latissima =

Species of flowering plant

Dianella latissima, commonly known as blueberry and ink berry, is a species of flowering plant in the family Asphodelaceae. It is endemic to New Zealand; its range mainly covers the northern North Island. It grows in coastal to montane environments. The species was first described in 2007 by Peter de Lange and Peter Brian Heenan. A perennial herb, the species has long leaves and exposed inflorescences (flower clusters). The conservation status of D. latissima was assessed by the New Zealand Threat Classification System in 2023 as "Not Threatened".

== Description ==
Dianella latissima is a species of perennial herb in the family Asphodelaceae and the subfamily Hemerocallidoideae. It is evergreen, dense, tussock-like with horizontal rhizomes up to 100 mm long. Leaves are 0.5–1.2 metres (1 foot 8 inches – 3 feet 11 inches) long and 15–35 millimetres (0.59–1.38 inches) wide. They are green to light green, curved and hanging, with smooth, glossy blades. Leaf bases are pale green to yellow-green in colour.

The inflorescences (flower clusters) can rise 1–1.5 m (3 ft 3 in – 4 ft 11 in) above the foliage. The panicles are 500–800 mm (20–31 in) long. Flowers are 9–11 mm in diameter. The sepals are 4.4–4.5 × 1.6–1.7 mm long. The glossy berries are 8–20 × 7–10 mm long, initially coloured grey-white or dull, then ripening to a violet-blue colour. The typically violet-blue colour of the berries of the Dianella genus is attributed to the anthocyanins and pigments in them. D. latissima's seeds are about 1.8–2.1 × 2.3–3.0 mm long.

== Taxonomy ==
The Dianella genus was first established in 1789 by the French naturalist Jean-Baptiste Lamarck. D. haematica was first described in 2007 by Peter de Lange and Peter Brian Heenan. There are forty species of the Dianella genus currently accepted by the Plants of the World Online taxonomic database. This genus is widespread and is found in several countries in Africa, Asia, and Oceania. The genus Dianella is closely related to Thelionema and Herpolirion.

=== Etymology ===
The etymology (word origin) of D. latissima's genus name, Dianella, refers to the Roman goddess of the chase Diana. The specific epithet (second part of the scientific name), latissima, refers to the wide leaves which are the largest of the New Zealand species. The species is commonly known as blueberry and inkberry.

== Distribution ==
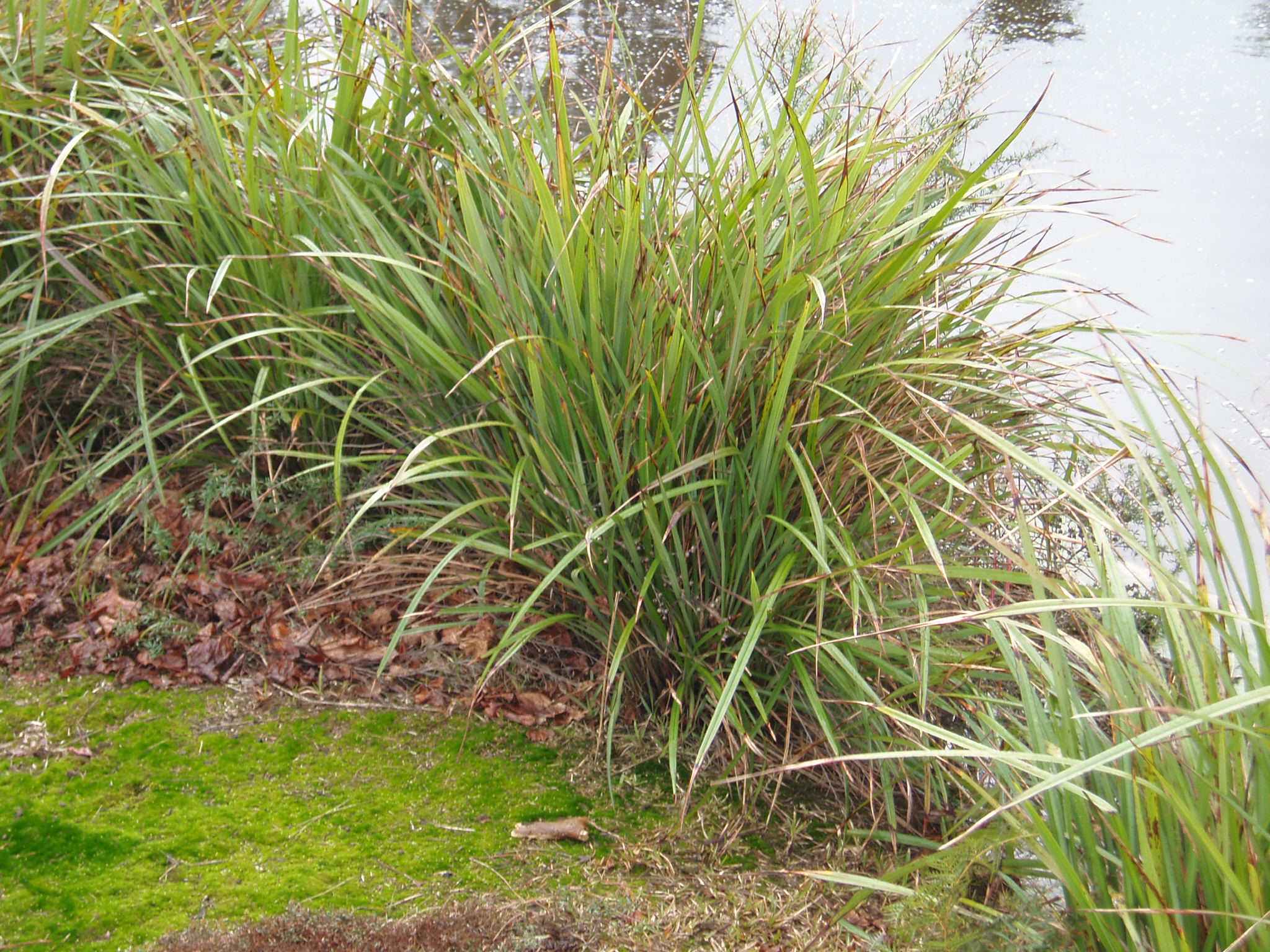
Habitat of Dianella latissima

Dianella latissima is endemic to New Zealand. It is mainly found in the northern North Island, but also occurs on some offshore islands, such as the Hen and Chickens Islands, and islands in the Hauraki Gulf such as Little Barrier, Great Barrier, Ponui, and Pakihi. The conservation status of D. latissima was assessed by the New Zealand Threat Classification System in 2023 as "Not Threatened".

=== Habitat ===
Dianella latissima is found in coastal to montane environments. It commonly associates with kauri (Agathis australis).

== Ecology ==
Dianella latissima's pollination strategy is unknown, but its relative D. tasminca has a cleistogamy pollination strategy, and the flowers are capable of self-pollinating. The berries of D. latissima are dispersed by fruit-eating animals (frugivores).

== Works cited ==
Books

- Gledhill, David (2008). The Names of Plants. Cambridge, United Kingdom: Cambridge University Press. ISBN 978-0-521-68553-5.
- Metcalf, Lawrie (2009). Know Your New Zealand Native Plants. Auckland, New Zealand: White Cloud Books. ISBN 978-1-77694-036-3.

Journals

- Bloor, Stephen J (2001). "Deep Blue Anthocyanins from Blue Dianella Berries". Phytochemistry. 58 (6): 923–927. doi:10.1016/S0031-9422(01)00343-0.
- Devey, Dion; Leitch, Ilia; Pires, Chris; Pillon, Yohan; Chase, Mark (2006). "Systematics of Xanthorrhoeaceae Sensu Lato, with an Emphasis on Bulbine". Aliso. 22 (1): 345–351. doi:10.5642/aliso.20062201.28.
- Heenan, P. B.; De Lange, P. J. (2007). "Two new species of Dianella (Hemerocallidaceae) from New Zealand". New Zealand Journal of Botany. 45 (1): 269–285. doi:10.1080/00288250709509714. ISSN 0028-825X.
- Muscat, Karen M.; Ladiges, Pauline Y.; Bayly, Michael J. (2019). "Molecular phylogenetic relationships reveal taxonomic and biogeographic clades in Dianella (flax lilies; Asphodelaceae, Hemerocallidoideae)". Systematics and Biodiversity. 17 (3): 308–329. doi:10.1080/14772000.2019.1607617. ISSN 1477-2000.

Websites

- De Lange, Peter (2026). "Dianella latissima". New Zealand Plant Conservation Network. Archived from the original on 8 September 2025.
- "Dianella Lam. ex Juss". Plants of the World Online. Archived from the original on 17 December 2024 – via Royal Botanic Gardens, Kew.
