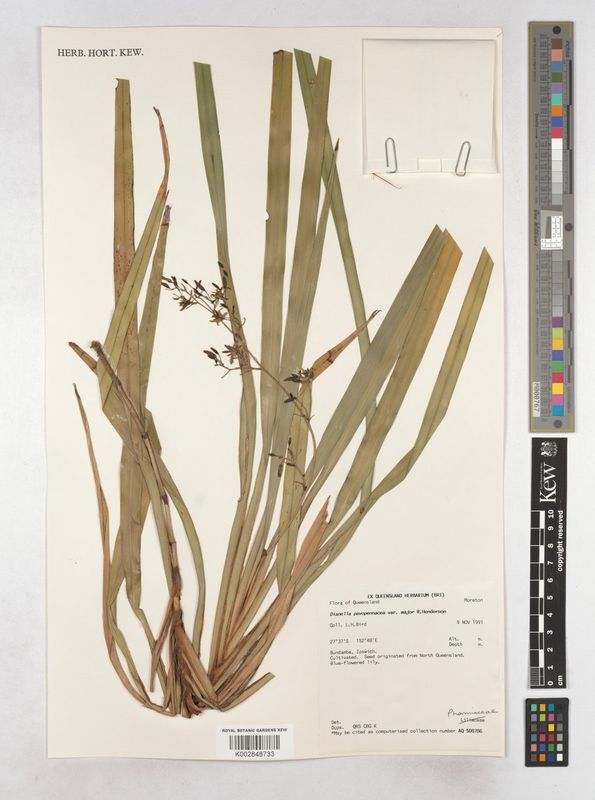
- Dianella pavopennacea var. major

Scientific classification
- Kingdom: Plantae
- Clade: Embryophytes
- Clade: Tracheophytes
- Clade: Spermatophytes
- Clade: Angiosperms
- Clade: Monocots
- Order: Asparagales
- Family: Asphodelaceae
- Subfamily: Hemerocallidoideae
- Genus: Dianella
- Species: D. pavopennacea

Binomial name
- Dianella pavopennacea R.J.F.Hend.

Varieties
- Dianella pavopennacea var. major R.J.F.Hend.; Dianella pavopennacea var. pavopennacea; Dianella pavopennacea var. robusta R.J.F.Hend.

= Dianella pavopennacea =

Species of flowering plant

Dianella pavopennacea is a species of flowering plant in the family Asphodelaceae. It is a perennial with conical inflorescences, blue or purple flowers, and berries. The species is native to Queensland, Australia, and was described in 1987.

== Taxonomy ==
The species was described by Rodney John Francis Henderson in 1987. The type specimen was transplanted from near Wenlock, Queensland, and cultivated at the Royal Botanic Garden, Sydney.

Three varieties are recognised:

- Dianella pavopennacea var. major R.J.F.Hend.
- Dianella pavopennacea var. pavopennacea
- Dianella pavopennacea var. robusta R.J.F.Hend.

== Distribution ==
Dianella pavopennacea is native to the wet tropical biome of northern Queensland, Australia. The species is present from southern Cooktown to the Torres Strait Islands.

The species grows mainly on loamy and sandy soils, in open eucalyptus forests.

== Description ==
Dianella pavopennacea is a perennial plant with fibrous roots. It grows up to 1.5 metres (4.9 ft) high, and the stems are 0.1–1.2 metres (0.33–3.94 ft) long. The leaves are 0.5–2.8 centimetres (0.20–1.10 in) wide, more or less flat, hooded, and obtuse.

The inflorescences are more or less conical. The flower stems are 3–10 millimetres (0.12–0.39 in) long. The perianth segments are blue or purple, and narrowly-ovate to elliptical. The sepals are 4.3–10 millimetres (0.17–0.39 in) long, and have five to seven nerves. The petals are 3.6–9 millimetres (0.14–0.35 in) long, and usually have three or four nerves.

The fruits are 5–8 millimetres (0.20–0.31 in) long berries. The seeds are smooth, black, shiny, and 2.8–3.9 millimetres (0.11–0.15 in) long.

Dianella pavopennacea appears to be closely related to Dianella odorata.
