= Dianella brevipedunculata =

Scientific classification
- Kingdom: Plantae
- Clade: Tracheophytes
- Clade: Angiosperms
- Clade: Monocots
- Order: Asparagales
- Family: Asphodelaceae
- Subfamily: Hemerocallidoideae
- Genus: Dianella
- Species: D. brevipedunculata

Binomial name
- Dianella brevipedunculata R.J.F.Hend.

Species of flowering plant

Dianella brevipedunculata is a species of flax lily native to Eastern Australia. It is known as the blue flax lily.

The species grows up to half a meter in height, with leaves up to 1 meter in length. Roots are fibrous, and the flowers are purplish-blue. Fruit are round and blue. The species is hardy and perennial.

Dianella brevipedunculata is common in cultivation as an ornamental plant. The berries are reported to be mildly toxic.
