= Dianella atraxis =

Scientific classification
- Kingdom: Plantae
- Clade: Tracheophytes
- Clade: Angiosperms
- Clade: Monocots
- Order: Asparagales
- Family: Asphodelaceae
- Subfamily: Hemerocallidoideae
- Genus: Dianella
- Species: D. atraxis

Binomial name
- Dianella atraxis R.J.F.Hend.

Species of flowering plant

Dianella atraxis is a species of flowering plant in the family Asphodelaceae. It is a shrub with papery leaves, blue flowers, and spherical berries. The species is native to Queensland, Australia, and was described in 1987.

== Taxonomy ==
The species was described by Rodney John Francis Henderson in 1987.

== Distribution ==
Dianella atraxis is native to the seasonally dry tropical biome of north-east Queensland, Australia. It grows in coastal areas and rainforests, at elevations of up to 500 metres (1,600 ft).

== Description ==
Dianella atraxis is a shrub that grows up to 1 metre (3.3 ft) high. The roots are fibrous. The stems are up to 30 centimetres (12 in) long.

The leaves are flat, papery, 20–90 centimetres (7.9–35.4 in) long, and 1.8–4.5 centimetres (0.71–1.77 in) wide. The edges are finely toothed.

The inflorescence is cylindrical or ovate in outline, and has five to fifty flowers. The flower stems are 2–5 millimetres (0.079–0.197 in) long. The flowers are dark blue to violet, and the perianth segments are narrowly ovate to elliptical. The sepals are 6–7 millimetres (0.24–0.28 in) long, and have five nerves. The petals are 5–6 millimetres (0.20–0.24 in) long, and have five nerves.

The fruit is a spherical, 6–8 millimetres (0.24–0.31 in) wide berry. The seeds are black, shiny, 2.6–3.5 millimetres (0.10–0.14 in) long, and have a smooth case. Each locule has six to eight ovules.

Dianella atraxis is similar to Dianella ensifolia, and to some varieties of Dianella caerulea.
