= Dianella bambusifolia =

Scientific classification
- Kingdom: Plantae
- Clade: Tracheophytes
- Clade: Angiosperms
- Clade: Monocots
- Order: Asparagales
- Family: Asphodelaceae
- Subfamily: Hemerocallidoideae
- Genus: Dianella
- Species: D. bambusifolia

Binomial name
- Dianella bambusifolia Hallier f.

Synonyms
- Dianella caerulea var. bambusacea F.Muell.

Species of flowering plant

Dianella bambusifolia is a species of flowering plant in the family Asphodelaceae. It is a perennial with pale blue or white flowers, and dark brown berries. The species is native to New Guinea and Queensland, Australia.

Dianella bambusifolia was first described as a variety of Dianella caerulea in 1868.

== Taxonomy ==
The species was described by Ferdinand von Mueller in 1868, and initially placed as a variety of Dianella caerulea. In 1914, Johannes Gottfried Hallier placed Dianella bambusifolia as a distinct species.

== Distribution ==
Dianella bambusifolia is native to the wet tropical biome of New Guinea and north-east Queensland, Australia. It grows in coastal areas and rainforests, on sand and loam. The species is present at elevations of up to 660 metres (2,170 ft).

== Description ==
Dianella bambusifolia is a perennial that grows up to 1 metre (3.3 ft) high. The stems are up to 80 centimetres (31 in) long, and the roots are fibrous.

The leaves are flat, 11–30 centimetres (4.3–11.8 in) long, and 1–3 centimetres (0.39–1.18 in) wide. The leaf stems are 6–7 centimetres (2.4–2.8 in) long.

The inflorescence is narrowly cylindrical, and has four to fifteen flowers. The flower stems are 1.5–10 millimetres (0.059–0.394 in) long. The perianth has elliptical segments. The sepals are purple, 4.5–5.5 millimetres (0.18–0.22 in) long, and have five nerves. The petals are pale blue or white, 3.7–5.2 millimetres (0.15–0.20 in) long, and have three nerves.

The fruit is a 4–7 millimetres (0.16–0.28 in) long berry. Each berry has four seeds. The seeds are dark brown, 3.8–4.5 millimetres (0.15–0.18 in), irregularly ribbed, and matt or shiny.

Dianella bambusifolia is similar to Dianella odorata.
