= Dianella lignosa =

Scientific classification
- Kingdom: Plantae
- Clade: Tracheophytes
- Clade: Angiosperms
- Clade: Monocots
- Order: Asparagales
- Family: Asphodelaceae
- Subfamily: Hemerocallidoideae
- Genus: Dianella
- Species: D. lignosa

Binomial name
- Dianella lignosa R.L.Barrett & M.D.Barrett

Species of flowering plant

Dianella lignosa, commonly known as the Kimberley flax lily, is a species of flowering plant in the family Asphodelaceae. It is a perennial herb with pale blue flowers and pale blue or purple fruits. The species is native to Australia, and was described in 2022.

== Taxonomy ==
The species was described by Russell Lindsay Barrett and Matthew David Barrett in 2022. It was previously included under Dianella longifolia.

== Distribution ==
Dianella lignosa is native to the subtropical biome of Kimberley, Western Australia. It is the only Dianella species found in Kimberley.

The species grows in sandy soil, in woodlands with Eucalyptus miniata, Eucalyptus tetrodonta, and Corymbia latifolia. Dianella lignosa is associated with Buchanania oblongifolia, Cajanus marmoratus, Commelina ensifolia, Decaschistia occidentalis, Eriachne, Erythrophleum, Galactia tenuiflora, Haemodorum ensifolium, Haemodorum flaviflorum, Haemodorum griseofuscum, Haemodorum interrex, Murdannia graminea, Pandanus spiralis, Petalostigma pubescens, Sarga, Triodia, and Triumfetta.

== Description ==
Dianella lignosa is a perennial herb that grows to around 80 centimetres (31 in) high. It grows to around 50 centimetres (20 in) wide at the base. The ramets grow from a woody brown rhizome. The leaves are soft, smooth, 13–46 centimetres (5.1–18.1 in) long, and 6–12 millimetres (0.24–0.47 in) wide.

The inflorescence is an 8–12 centimetres (3.1–4.7 in) long, compound panicle with up to five branches, and five to eighteen flowers. The flower stems are 8–21 millimetres (0.31–0.83 in) long. The flowers have a weak, sweet scent, and open in the early morning. The perianth segments are 6–10 millimetres (0.24–0.39 in) long, 1.8–2.2 millimetres (0.071–0.087 in) wide, ovate-lanceolate to elliptic, pale blue, and usually have five purple veins. The plant has been observed flowering in January.

The fruit is 3.5–5 millimetres (0.14–0.20 in) long, 2.5–4 millimetres (0.098–0.157 in) wide, subglobose to ovoid, and ripens from mid-green to whitish, pale blue, or purple. The plant has been recorded fruiting from January to April.

== Etymology ==
The specific epithet lignosa is derived from the Latin lignosus, meaning "wood-like". It refers to the species' distinctive woody rhizomes.
