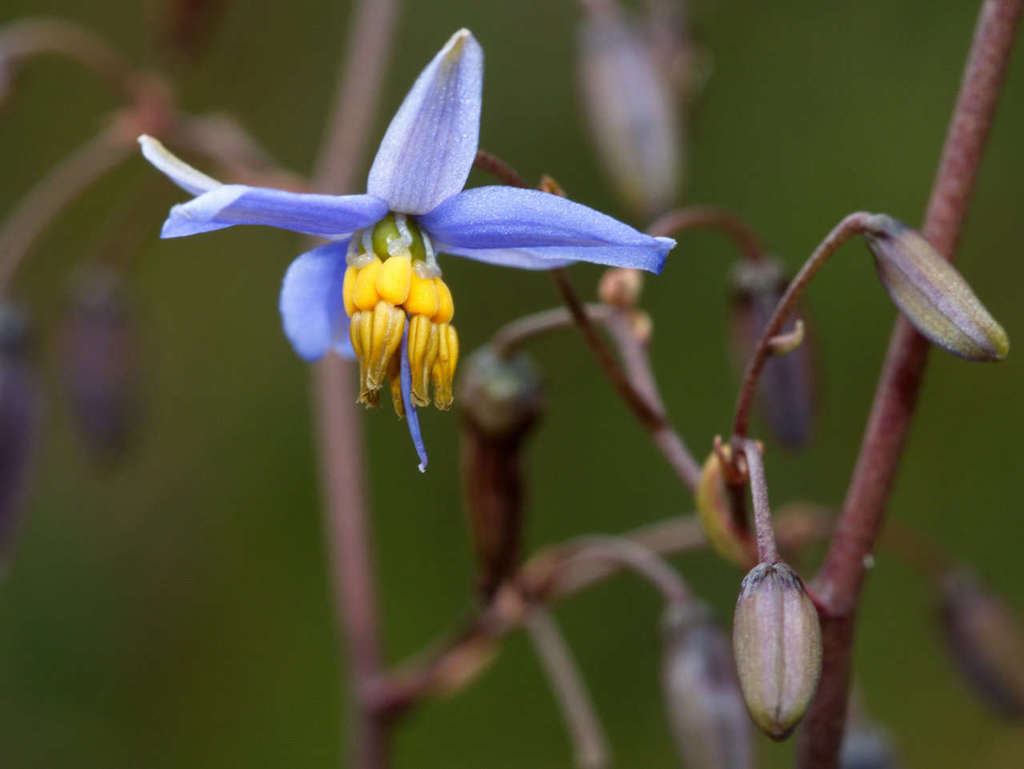

Scientific classification
- Kingdom: Plantae
- Clade: Embryophytes
- Clade: Tracheophytes
- Clade: Spermatophytes
- Clade: Angiosperms
- Clade: Monocots
- Order: Asparagales
- Family: Asphodelaceae
- Subfamily: Hemerocallidoideae
- Genus: Dianella
- Species: D. callicarpa

Binomial name
- Dianella callicarpa G.W.Carr & P.F.Horsfall

= Dianella callicarpa =

Species of flowering plant

Dianella callicarpa, commonly known as swamp flax-lily, is a species of flowering plant in the family Asphodelaceae. It is native to Victoria, Australia, and was described in 1995.

Dianella callicarpa is an evergreen subshrub with lilac, mauve, or blue-violet flowers. The fruits are berries. The specific epithet refers to the species' "brilliant, deep purple fruits."

== Taxonomy ==
The species was described by Geoffrey William Carr and Peter F. Horsfall in 1995, in the journal Muelleria. The holotype was cultivated in Carr's garden.

The species was first collected by Alexander Clifford Beauglehole, and was initially mistaken for Dianella tasmanica.

== Distribution ==
Dianella callicarpa is native to the subtropical biome of Victoria, Australia. It has been recorded in the Grampians, Hamilton, and Portland areas.

It grows in grasslands, woodlands, and swamp-scrub. The species mostly grows in waterlogged or moist clay soil derived from basalt, but can also grow in sandy loam.

== Description ==
Dianella callicarpa is an evergreen perennial tufted subshrub, that grows up to 1.9 metres (6.2 ft) high. It can grow up to 1.5 metres (4.9 ft) wide at the base. The species can spread via rhizomes to form colonies. The roots are fibrous and yellow.

The leaves are lorate, and flat or slightly curved at the edges. The leaves are dark to mid green, and are often reddish at the base. The leaves are 30–80 centimetres (12–31 in) long, and 8–20 millimetres (0.31–0.79 in) wide.

The inflorescence is 60–190 centimetres (24–75 in) long, and has a sparse ovoid panicle, measuring 25–50 centimetres (9.8–19.7 in) long. The flower stems are 3–11 millimetres (0.12–0.43 in) long. The flowers are nodding, medium-sized, and have a weak sweet scent. The flowers open in the early or mid morning, and collapse in the late afternoon. The perianth segments are lilac to mauve, or blue-violet suffused with crimson. The segments are curved, 6.5–9 millimetres (0.26–0.35 in) long, and 3–4.5 millimetres (0.12–0.18 in) wide. The plant flowers from October to February.

The fruits are deep purple, ovoid to globular berries, which are 6–18 millimetres (0.24–0.71 in) long. The ovary is green, and has three locules. The ovary is 1.25 millimetres (0.049 in) long, and 1.5 millimetres (0.059 in) wide. The seeds are smooth, black, shiny, around 3 millimetres (0.12 in) long, and around 2 millimetres (0.079 in) wide.

== Ecology ==
Dianella callicarpa has been found alongside Leucopogon affinis, Gahnia clarkei, Eucalyptus viminalis, Notelaea ligustrina, and Melicytus dentatus. Pollination has not been observed in situ, though an unidentified bee was seen on a cut inflorescence.

== Cultivation ==
Dianella callicarpa can be cultivated and propagated by division, and by seeds. The plants are self-fertile. Fruit production can be enhanced through artificial pollination.

== Conservation ==
Dianella callicarpa is listed as Endangered under the Flora and Fauna Guarantee Act 1988.

== Etymology ==
The specific epithet callicarpa is derived from the Greek calli (beautiful) and carpus (fruit). It refers to the "abundant, brilliant, deep purple fruits on a graceful infrutescence". The common name "Swamp flax-lily" refers to the species' moist habitat.
