= Dianella rara =

Scientific classification
- Kingdom: Plantae
- Clade: Tracheophytes
- Clade: Angiosperms
- Clade: Monocots
- Order: Asparagales
- Family: Asphodelaceae
- Subfamily: Hemerocallidoideae
- Genus: Dianella
- Species: D. rara

Binomial name
- Dianella rara R.Br.

Synonyms
- Dianella longifolia var. rara (R.Br.) Domin; Arthropodium dianellaceum F.Muell.

Species of flowering plant

Dianella rara, commonly known as the northern vanilla lily, is a species of flowering plant in the family Asphodelaceae. It is a subshrub or shrub with pale blue flowers. The species is native to Queensland, Australia, and was described in 1810.

== Taxonomy ==
The species was described by Robert Brown in 1810. Karel Domin classified it as a variety of Dianella longifolia.

== Distribution ==
Dianella rara is native to the seasonally dry tropical biome of Queensland, Australia. It occurs in open forests east of the Great Dividing Range.

== Description ==
Dianella rara is a subshrub or shrub that grows up to 0.8 metres (2.6 ft) high. The roots are tuberous. The leaves are 15–35 centimetres (5.9–13.8 in) long, and 0.2–0.5 centimetres (0.079–0.197 in) wide.

The inflorescences are irregular in outline, and have five to fifteen flowers. The flower stems are 14–28 millimetres (0.55–1.10 in) long. The perianth is pale blue. The sepals are narrowly elliptical, 7.5–8.5 millimetres (0.30–0.33 in) long, and have five nerves. The petals are elliptical, 7–8.2 millimetres (0.28–0.32 in) long, and have three nerves.

The fruit is a 2.5–4 millimetres (0.098–0.157 in) long berry. The seeds are black, shiny, and 2–2.8 millimetres (0.079–0.110 in) long.
