= Dianella fruticans =

Scientific classification
- Kingdom: Plantae
- Clade: Tracheophytes
- Clade: Angiosperms
- Clade: Monocots
- Order: Asparagales
- Family: Asphodelaceae
- Subfamily: Hemerocallidoideae
- Genus: Dianella
- Species: D. fruticans

Binomial name
- Dianella fruticans R.J.F.Hend.

Species of flowering plant

Dianella fruticans is a species of flowering plant in the family Asphodelaceae. It is a perennial with pale bluish yellow or greenish flowers, and purplish-blue berries. The species is native to Queensland, Australia, and was described in 1991.

== Taxonomy ==
The species was described by Rodney John Francis Henderson in 1991. The first specimens were collected from Mount Moffatt, Carnarvon National Park, in 1986.

== Distribution ==
Dianella fruticans is native to the seasonally dry tropical biome of eastern Queensland, Australia. It grows on rocky sandstone outcrops in eucalypt forests.

== Description ==
Dianella fruticans is a perennial that grows to around 2 metres (6.6 ft) high. The roots are fibrous and fleshy, and some have tubers that are up to 20 centimetres (7.9 in) long and 2.5 centimetres (0.98 in) wide. The leaves are 5–20 centimetres (2.0–7.9 in) long, 0.6–1.2 centimetres (0.24–0.47 in) wide, grey-green, and glaucous.

The inflorescences are irregular in outline, and have one to three flowers. The flower stems are 0.5–1 centimetre (0.20–0.39 in) long. The perianth has ovate to elliptical, pale bluish-yellow or greenish segments. The sepals are 7–8 millimetres (0.28–0.31 in) long, and have five nerves. The petals are 6.5–7 millimetres (0.26–0.28 in) long, and have five nerves. The plant flowers from spring to early summer.

The fruit is a purplish-blue berry measuring around 1 centimetre (0.39 in) long, and 1.2 centimetres (0.47 in) wide. The seeds are smooth, black, glossy, and 4.3–4.7 millimetres (0.17–0.19 in) long. The plant fruits from mid to late summer.

Dianella fruticans appears similar to Dianella incollata.

== Etymology ==
The specific epithet fruticans is Latin for "growing into a shrub-like plant", and refers to the plant's habit.
