= Dianella crinoides =

Scientific classification
- Kingdom: Plantae
- Clade: Tracheophytes
- Clade: Angiosperms
- Clade: Monocots
- Order: Asparagales
- Family: Asphodelaceae
- Subfamily: Hemerocallidoideae
- Genus: Dianella
- Species: D. crinoides

Binomial name
- Dianella crinoides R.J.F.Hend.

Species of flowering plant

Dianella crinoides is a species of flowering plant in the family Asphodelaceae. It is a subshrub or shrub with blue flowers. The species is native to Australia, and was described in 1987.

== Taxonomy ==
The species was described by Rodney John Francis Henderson in 1987. It is most closely related to varieties of Dianella longifolia.

== Distribution ==
Dianella crinoides is native to the seasonally dry tropical biome of New South Wales and Queensland, Australia. It is found in maritime areas, in sand and sandy soil, and is often found near Dianella congesta.

== Description ==
Dianella crinoides is a subshrub or shrub. It grows up to 0.8 metres (2.6 ft) high. The stems are up to 15 centimetres (5.9 in) long. The roots are fleshy and fibrous. The leaves are 20–70 centimetres (7.9–27.6 in) long, and 0.6–1.8 centimetres (0.24–0.71 in) wide.

The inflorescence is irregular in outline, and have five to fifteen flowers. The flower stems are up to 7.5 millimetres (0.30 in) long. The perianth has blue, narrowly elliptical to ovate segments. The sepals are 7.5–9.5 millimetres (0.30–0.37 in) long, and have five to nine nerves. The petals are 7–8.5 millimetres (0.28–0.33 in) long, and have three to five nerves. The plant flowers in spring and summer.

The fruit is a 5–8 millimetres (0.20–0.31 in) long berry. The seeds are smooth, black, shiny, and 2.5–3.2 millimetres (0.098–0.126 in) long.
