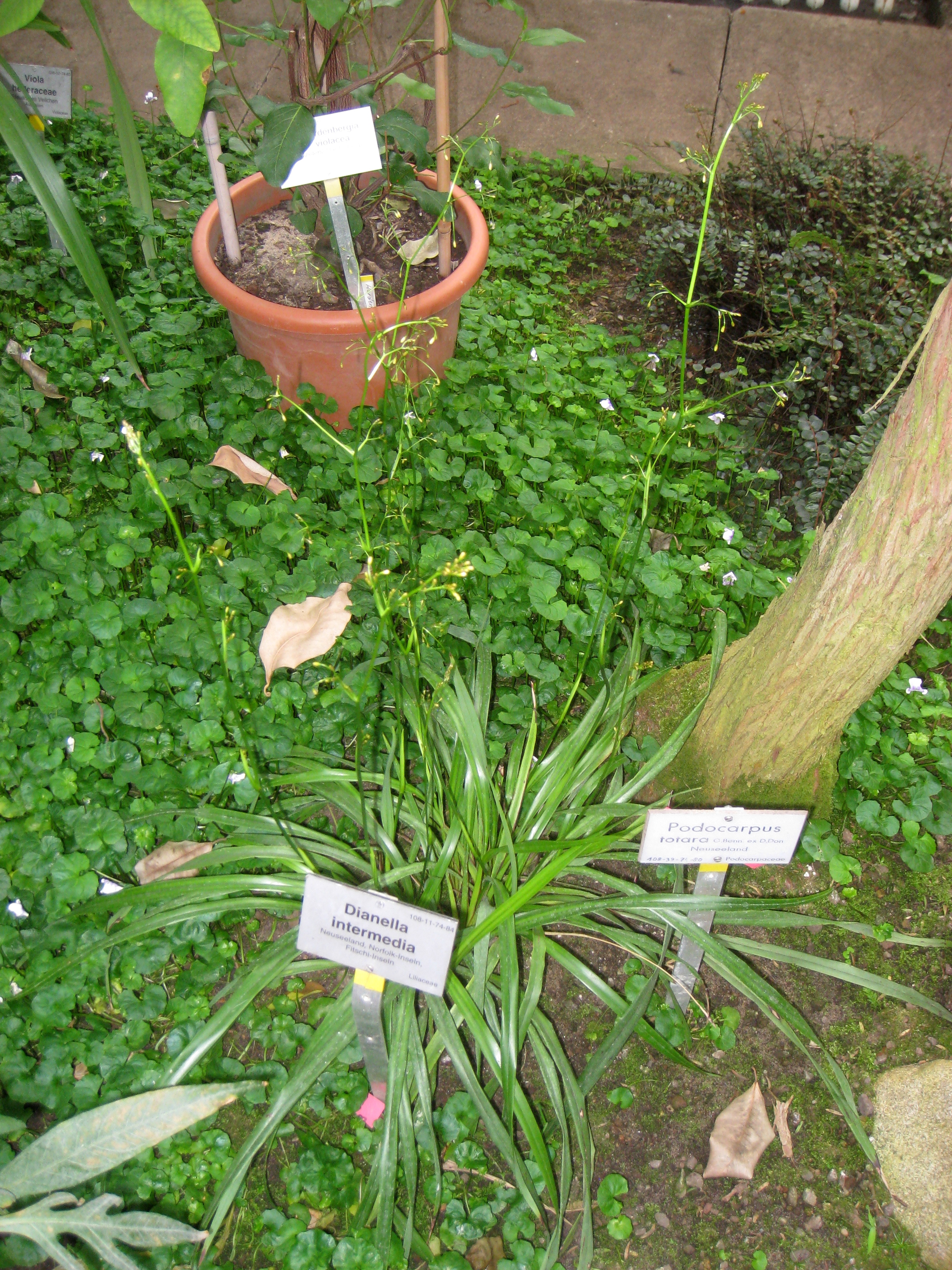

Scientific classification
- Kingdom: Plantae
- Clade: Tracheophytes
- Clade: Angiosperms
- Clade: Monocots
- Order: Asparagales
- Family: Asphodelaceae
- Subfamily: Hemerocallidoideae
- Genus: Dianella
- Species: D. intermedia

Binomial name
- Dianella intermedia Endl.

= Dianella intermedia =

Species of flowering plant

Dianella intermedia, is a perennial herb of the family Asphodelaceae, subfamily Hemerocallidoideae, found in the Australian territories of Lord Howe Island and Norfolk Island. It was first described by Stephan Endlicher in 1833. It grows to 2 feet with pale violet flowers followed by turquoise berries.
