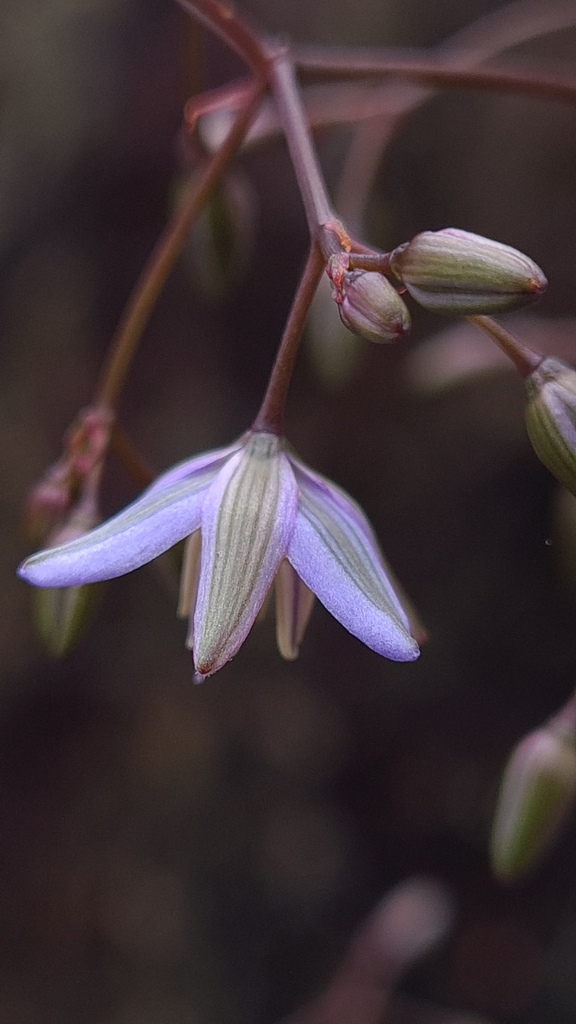

Scientific classification
- Kingdom: Plantae
- Clade: Embryophytes
- Clade: Tracheophytes
- Clade: Angiosperms
- Clade: Monocots
- Order: Asparagales
- Family: Asphodelaceae
- Subfamily: Hemerocallidoideae
- Genus: Dianella
- Species: D. prunina

Binomial name
- Dianella prunina R.J.F.Hend.

= Dianella prunina =

Species of flowering plant

Dianella prunina is a species of flowering plant in the family Asphodelaceae. It is a perennial plant with blue to purple flowers. The fruits are berries. The species is native to New South Wales, Australia, and was described in 1987.

== Taxonomy ==
Dianella prunina was described by Rodney John Francis Henderson in 1987. It is closely related to Dianella revoluta.

== Distribution ==
Dianella prunina is native to the subtropical biome of south-east New South Wales. It grows in the Sydney Basin, from Wollemi National Park to Bundanoon.

The species grows on sandy soils in Eucalyptus forest, at elevations of 60–1,000 metres (200–3,280 ft).

== Description ==
Dianella prunina is a perennial herb that grows up to 2 metres (6.6 ft) high. The stems are around 25 centimetres (9.8 in) long. The roots are fibrous and fleshy. The leaves are 15–90 centimetres (5.9–35.4 in) long, 0.8–3.8 centimetres (0.31–1.50 in) wide, and flat to curved.

The inflorescences are more or less conical in outline, and have two to eight flowers. The flower stems are around 2 metres (79 in) long. The perianth is mid-blue to dark violet in colour. The sepals are narrowly ovate to elliptic, 7–10.5 millimetres (0.28–0.41 in) long, and have five veins. The petals are narrowly elliptical, 7.9–5 millimetres (0.31–0.20 in) long, and normally have five nerves. The plant flowers in spring.

The fruit is a 5–8 millimetres (0.20–0.31 in) long berry. The seeds are 3.5–5 millimetres (0.14–0.20 in) long, and can be dull or shiny. The seed case is grooved.
