= Dianella porracea =

Scientific classification
- Kingdom: Plantae
- Clade: Tracheophytes
- Clade: Angiosperms
- Clade: Monocots
- Order: Asparagales
- Family: Asphodelaceae
- Subfamily: Hemerocallidoideae
- Genus: Dianella
- Species: D. porracea

Binomial name
- Dianella porracea (R.J.F.Hend.) P.F.Horsfall & G.W.Carr

Synonyms
- Dianella longifolia var. porracea R.J.F.Hend.

Species of flowering plant

Dianella porracea, commonly known as the leek flax-lily, is a species of flowering plant in the family Asphodelaceae. It is a perennial herb with pale green or blue flowers, and blue berries. The species is native to Australia, and was described in 1987.

== Taxonomy ==
The species was first described by Rodney John Francis Henderson in 1987, and placed as a variety of Dianella longifolia. He suggested that it could later be elevated to a subspecies or species. In 1995, P.F. Horsfall and Geoffrey William Carr placed it as a distinct species.

== Distribution ==
Dianella porracea is native to the deserts, dry shrublands, and riparian forests of New South Wales, South Australia, and Queensland. It often grows on red loam.

== Description ==
Dianella porracea is a perennial herb that grows up to 1.2 metres (3.9 ft) tall. The roots are fleshy and fibrous. It can survive for several months with inundated roots.

The leaves are smooth, broad, flat, soft, and fleshy. The leaves are 20–50 centimetres (7.9–19.7 in) long, and 0.5–2 centimetres (0.20–0.79 in) wide.

The inflorescences are 15–50 centimetres (5.9–19.7 in) long, semi-globular in outline, and have two to ten flowers. The flower stems are 3–8 millimetres (0.12–0.31 in) long, and curved. The flowers are pale green to pale blue, and 13–18 millimetres (0.51–0.71 in) wide. The outer tepals are 6–10 millimetres (0.24–0.39 in) long, and have five veins. The inner tepals are 5.5–9 millimetres (0.22–0.35 in) long, and have three veins. The plant flowers in spring and summer, and the flowers open around midday.

The fruit is an ovoid or globular, 3–7 millimetres (0.12–0.28 in) long berry. The beries are blue when ripe. The seeds are black, and 3–4.2 millimetres (0.12–0.17 in) long.
