= Dianella incollata =

Scientific classification
- Kingdom: Plantae
- Clade: Tracheophytes
- Clade: Angiosperms
- Clade: Monocots
- Order: Asparagales
- Family: Asphodelaceae
- Subfamily: Hemerocallidoideae
- Genus: Dianella
- Species: D. incollata

Binomial name
- Dianella incollata R.J.F.Hend.

Species of flowering plant

Dianella incollata is a species of flowering plant in the family Asphodelaceae. It is a subshrub with blue flowers. The fruit is a berry. The species is native to Queensland, Australia, and was described in 1987.

== Taxonomy ==
The species was described by Rodney John Francis Henderson in 1987.

== Distribution ==
Dianella incollata is native to the wet tropical biome of north-eastern Queensland, Australia. It grows in dry sandy soil.

== Description ==
Dianella incollata is a subshrub. It grows up to 0.7 metres (2.3 ft) high. The stems are 30–75 centimetres (12–30 in) long. The roots are fibrous. The leaves are 10–40 centimetres (3.9–15.7 in) long, and 0.5–1.1 centimetres (0.20–0.43 in) long.

The inflorescences are irregular in outline, and have four to twelve flowers. The flower stems are 2–8 millimetres (0.079–0.315 in) long. The perianth segments are blue, and oblong to elliptical. The sepals are 6.5–8 millimetres (0.26–0.31 in) long, and have five nerves. The petals are 6.5–7.5 millimetres (0.26–0.30 in) long, and have three to five nerves.

The fruit is a 5–7.5 millimetres (0.20–0.30 in) long berry. The seeds are black, shiny, and 3.5–4.5 millimetres (0.14–0.18 in) long.

Dianella incollata is thought to be closely related to Dianella odorata.
