= Dianella pendula =

Scientific classification
- Kingdom: Plantae
- Clade: Tracheophytes
- Clade: Angiosperms
- Clade: Monocots
- Order: Asparagales
- Family: Asphodelaceae
- Subfamily: Hemerocallidoideae
- Genus: Dianella
- Species: D. pendula

Binomial name
- Dianella pendula Schlittler

Species of flowering plant

Dianella pendula is a species of flowering plant in the family Asphodelaceae.

== Taxonomy ==
The species was described by Jakob Schlittler in 1940.

== Distribution ==
Dianella pendula is native to the wet tropical biome of the Loyalty Islands, New Caledonia.
