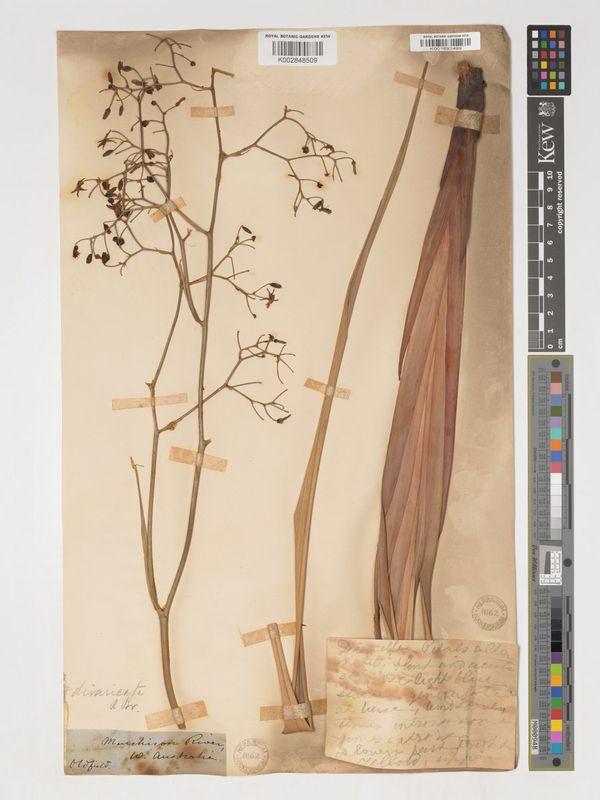

Scientific classification
- Kingdom: Plantae
- Clade: Embryophytes
- Clade: Tracheophytes
- Clade: Angiosperms
- Clade: Monocots
- Order: Asparagales
- Family: Asphodelaceae
- Subfamily: Hemerocallidoideae
- Genus: Dianella
- Species: D. plicata

Binomial name
- Dianella plicata Schlittler

= Dianella plicata =

Species of flowering plant

Dianella plicata is a species of flowering plant in the family Asphodelaceae.

== Taxonomy ==
The species was described by Jakob Schlittler in 1940.

== Distribution ==
Dianella plicata is native to the wet tropical biome of New Caledonia.
