= Dianella carolinensis =

Scientific classification
- Kingdom: Plantae
- Clade: Tracheophytes
- Clade: Angiosperms
- Clade: Monocots
- Order: Asparagales
- Family: Asphodelaceae
- Subfamily: Hemerocallidoideae
- Genus: Dianella
- Species: D. carolinensis

Binomial name
- Dianella carolinensis Lauterb.

Species of flowering plant

Dianella carolinensis is a species of flowering plant in the family Asphodelaceae. It is a perennial native to the Caroline Islands, and was described in 1913.

== Taxonomy ==
The species was described by Carl Adolf Georg Lauterbach in 1913.

== Distribution ==
Dianella carolinensis is native to the wet tropical biome of the Caroline Islands.

== Description ==
Dianella carolinensis is a perennial.

== Nomenclature ==
In Palauan, the species is known as Kobesos.
