= Dianella nervosa =

Scientific classification
- Kingdom: Plantae
- Clade: Tracheophytes
- Clade: Angiosperms
- Clade: Monocots
- Order: Asparagales
- Family: Asphodelaceae
- Subfamily: Hemerocallidoideae
- Genus: Dianella
- Species: D. nervosa

Binomial name
- Dianella nervosa R.J.F.Hend.

Species of flowering plant

Dianella nervosa is a species of flowering plant in the family Asphodelaceae. It is a perennial with blue flowers. The species is native to Australia, and was described in 1987.

== Taxonomy ==
The species was described by Rodney John Francis Henderson in 1987.

== Distribution ==
Dianella nervosa is native to the seasonally dry tropical biome of Queensland and New South Wales. It grows in open eucalypt forests, in sandy and loamy soils.

== Description ==
Dianella nervosa is a perennial that grows up to 0.7 metres (2.3 ft) high. The stems are under 4 centimetres (1.6 in) long. The roots are fleshy and fibrous. The leaves are 20–110 centimetres (7.9–43.3 in) long, and 0.4–1.2 centimetres (0.16–0.47 in) wide.

The inflorescence is more or less conical in outline, and has two to fifteen flowers. The flower stems grow to around 14 millimetres (0.55 in) long. The perianth segments are ovate to elliptic, and blue. The sepals are 7–10 millimetres (0.28–0.39 in) long, and have five to seven nerves. The petals are 6.5–9.5 millimetres (0.26–0.37 in) long, and have three to five nerves. The plant flowers in spring.

The fruit is a berry, and is less than 1 centimetre (0.39 in) long. The seeds are black, shiny, and 3.5–4.5 millimetres (0.14–0.18 in) long.
