= Dianella acutifolia =

Scientific classification
- Kingdom: Plantae
- Clade: Tracheophytes
- Clade: Angiosperms
- Clade: Monocots
- Order: Asparagales
- Family: Asphodelaceae
- Subfamily: Hemerocallidoideae
- Genus: Dianella
- Species: D. acutifolia

Binomial name
- Dianella acutifolia Schlittler

Species of flowering plant

Dianella acutifolia is a species of flowering plant in the family Asphodelaceae. It is native to New Caledonia, and was described in 1940.

== Taxonomy ==
The species was described by Jakob Schlittler in 1940.

== Distribution ==
Dianella acutifolia is native to the wet tropical biome of New Caledonia.
