= Dianella monophylla =

Scientific classification
- Kingdom: Plantae
- Clade: Embryophytes
- Clade: Tracheophytes
- Clade: Spermatophytes
- Clade: Angiosperms
- Clade: Monocots
- Order: Asparagales
- Family: Asphodelaceae
- Subfamily: Hemerocallidoideae
- Genus: Dianella
- Species: D. monophylla

Binomial name
- Dianella monophylla Hallier f.

Species of flowering plant

Dianella monophylla is a species of flowering plant in the family Asphodelaceae. It is a perennial native to New Guinea, and was described in 1914.

== Taxonomy ==
Dianella monophylla was described by Johannes Gottfried Hallier in 1914.

== Distribution ==
Dianella monophylla is native to the wet tropical biome of New Guinea.

== Description ==
Dianella monophylla is a perennial plant.
