= Dianella dentata =

Scientific classification
- Kingdom: Plantae
- Clade: Tracheophytes
- Clade: Angiosperms
- Clade: Monocots
- Order: Asparagales
- Family: Asphodelaceae
- Subfamily: Hemerocallidoideae
- Genus: Dianella
- Species: D. dentata

Binomial name
- Dianella dentata Schlittler

Species of flowering plant

Dianella dentata is a species of flowering plant in the family Asphodelaceae. It is a subshrub native to China, and was described in 1940.

== Taxonomy ==
The species was described by Jakob Schlittler in 1940.

== Distribution ==
Dianella dentata is native to the subtropical biome of south-east China.

== Description ==
Dianella dentata is a subshrub.
