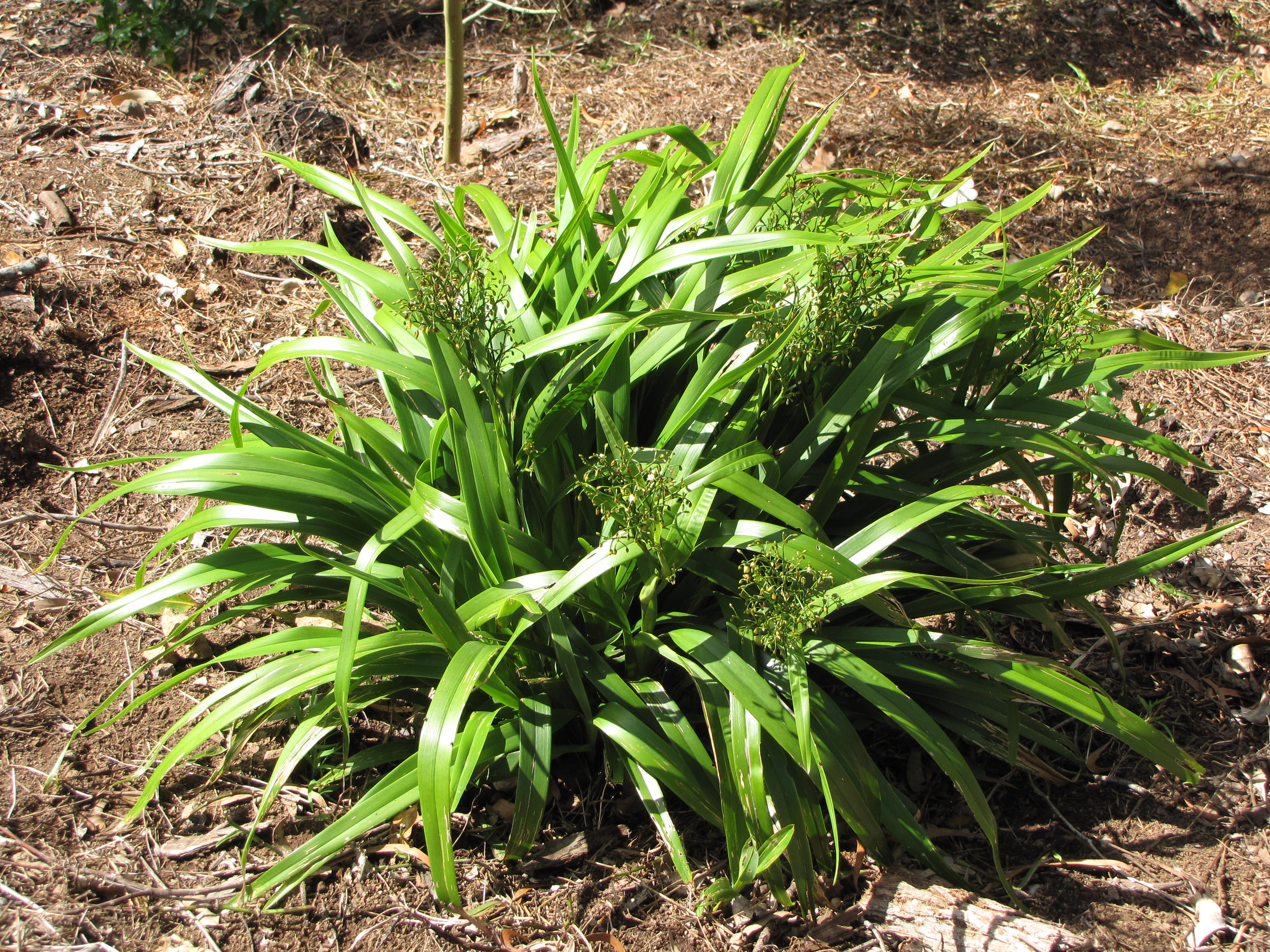
- Flowering and fruiting in Maui

Scientific classification
- Kingdom: Plantae
- Clade: Tracheophytes
- Clade: Angiosperms
- Clade: Monocots
- Order: Asparagales
- Family: Asphodelaceae
- Subfamily: Hemerocallidoideae
- Genus: Dianella
- Species: D. sandwicensis

Binomial name
- Dianella sandwicensis Hook. & Arn.

= Dianella sandwicensis =

Species of flowering plant

Dianella sandwicensis, the Hawaiian lily, is a species of flax lily native to Hawaii and New Caledonia. In Hawaiian it is called ʻukiʻuki. Neal (1965) reports that historically, Hawaiians used the berries to make blue dye for kapa. They also used the leaves for thatching house walls.

When sterile, Dianella sandwicensis is similar in appearance to Machaerina angustifolia.

Its leaves are simple, linear-lanceolate shaped, and usually have entire margins. Also typically blue to purple in color with its anther being orange. Wolkis et al., describes the flowers as "sweet-scented".

== Distribution and habitat ==
Commonly found in the ridges on Oahu, Maui, and Kauai. It has not been confirmed, but it is entirely possible that this specific trope of Dianella is also found in the Marquesas, according to Brown's specimen collection.

== Human use and cultural significance ==
D. sandwicensis has been historically used as a blue dye for clothing.
