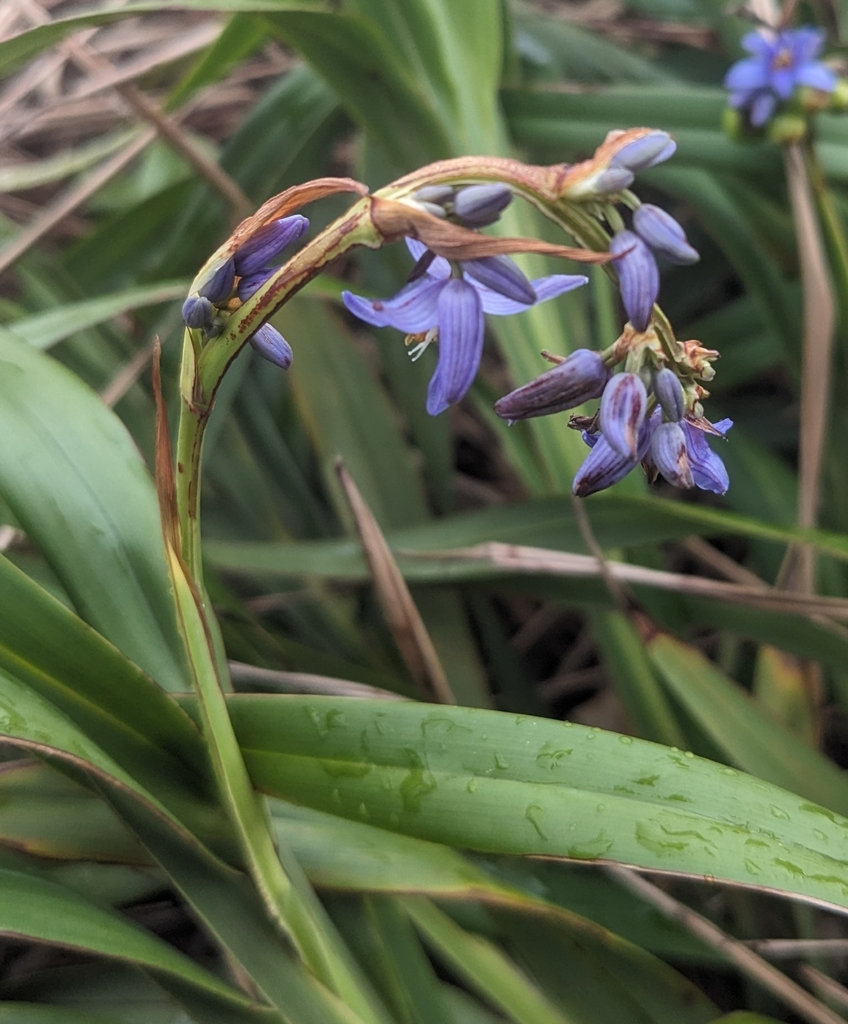

Scientific classification
- Kingdom: Plantae
- Clade: Embryophytes
- Clade: Tracheophytes
- Clade: Spermatophytes
- Clade: Angiosperms
- Clade: Monocots
- Order: Asparagales
- Family: Asphodelaceae
- Subfamily: Hemerocallidoideae
- Genus: Dianella
- Species: D. congesta

Binomial name
- Dianella congesta R.Br.

Synonyms
- Dianella caerulea var. congesta (R.Br.) F.M.Bailey; Dianella nemorosa f. congesta (R.Br.) Schlittler

= Dianella congesta =

Species of flowering plant

Dianella congesta, commonly known as beach flax lily, is a species of flowering plant in the family Asphodelaceae. It is a shrub up to 1 metre (3.3 ft) high, with blue flowers.

The species is native to Australia, and was described in 1810.

== Taxonomy ==
The species was described by Robert Brown in 1810. Frederick Manson Bailey placed it as a variety of Dianella caerulea. Jakob Schlittler placed it as a form of Dianella nemorosa (a synonym of Dianella ensifolia).

== Distribution ==
Dianella congesta is native to the seasonally dry tropical biome of south-east Queensland and eastern New South Wales, Australia. It grows mainly on coastal sand dunes, and is an effective sand-binder.

== Description ==
Dianella congesta is a subshrub or shrub. It grows up to 1 metre (3.3 ft) high, and forms mats that can be 20 metres (66 ft) wide at the base. The stems are 50–60 centimetres (1.6–2.0 ft) long. The roots are fibrous.

The leaves are 10–45 centimetres (0.33–1.48 ft) long, 1–1.5 centimetres (0.39–0.59 in) wide, and curved downwards.

The inflorescences are narrowly cylindrical, and have two to eight flowers. The flower stems are less than 1 centimetre (0.39 in) long. The perianth segments are blue, and elliptic to ovate-elliptic. The sepals are 7.5–8.5 millimetres (0.30–0.33 in) long. The petals are 6.5–7.5 millimetres (0.26–0.30 in) long. The plant flowers in spring and summer.

The berries are 6–12 millimetres (0.24–0.47 in) long. The seeds are 2.9–3.9 millimetres (0.11–0.15 in) long. The seed case is smooth, black, and shiny.

Dianella congesta is closely related to Dianella caerulea.

== Uses ==
Dianella congesta has sometimes been used in horticulture and landscaping.
