= Dianella adenanthera =

Scientific classification
- Kingdom: Plantae
- Clade: Tracheophytes
- Clade: Angiosperms
- Clade: Monocots
- Order: Asparagales
- Family: Asphodelaceae
- Subfamily: Hemerocallidoideae
- Genus: Dianella
- Species: D. adenanthera

Binomial name
- Dianella adenanthera (G.Forst.) R.J.F.Hend.

Synonyms
- Anthericum adenanthera G.Forst.; Endogona adenanthera (G.Forst.) Raf.; Phalangium adenanthera (G.Forst.) Poir.; Dianella intermedia var. gambierensis F.Br.; Dianella intermedia var. marquisensis F.Br.; Dianella intermedia var. nukuhivensis F.Br.; Dianella intermedia var. punctata F.Br.

Species of flowering plant

Dianella adenanthera is a species of flowering plant in the family Asphodelaceae. It is a shrub with pale blue flowers and black berries. The species is native to islands in the South Pacific, and was first described in 1786.

== Taxonomy ==
The species was described by Georg Forster in 1786, as Anthericum adenanthera. In 1977, Rodney John Francis Henderson concluded that this name referred to at least three taxa. In 1988, Henderson moved Anthericum adenanthera from Anthericum to the genus Dianella.

== Distribution ==
Dianella adenanthera is native to the wet tropical biome of the South Pacific (Cook Islands, Fiji, Marquesas Islands, New Caledonia, Pitcairn Islands, Society Islands, Tonga, Tuamotus, Tubuai, and Vanuatu).

== Description ==
Dianella adenanthera is a shrub that grows to around 1 metre (3.3 ft) high. The rhizome is more or less contracted, and the roots are fibrous. The stem grows to around 20 centimetres (7.9 in) long. The scape is erect.

The leaves are curved, folded lengthwise, 5–75 centimetres (2.0–29.5 in) long, and 0.5–1.5 centimetres (0.20–0.59 in) wide. When dried, the leaf edges become curled.

The inflorescences are panicles with two to six flowers. The flowers grow on slender stems that are up to 2 centimetres (0.79 in) long. The flowers are pale or greenish blue. The sepals are 5–6 millimetres (0.20–0.24 in) long, and have five nerves. The petals are 4.2–5.5 millimetres (0.17–0.22 in) long, and have three nerves.

The fruit is a purplish-black, 5–7 millimetres (0.20–0.28 in) long, oblong to ovoid berry. Each locule has two ovules. The seeds are black, shiny, smooth or marked with smallow depressions, oblong to obovate, 3–3.5 millimetres (0.12–0.14 in) long, and 2–2.5 millimetres (0.079–0.098 in) wide.

Dianella adenanthera is similar to Dianella nigra.
