= Flax lily =

Flax lily may refer to two different plant genera:

- Dianella (plant)
- Phormium
