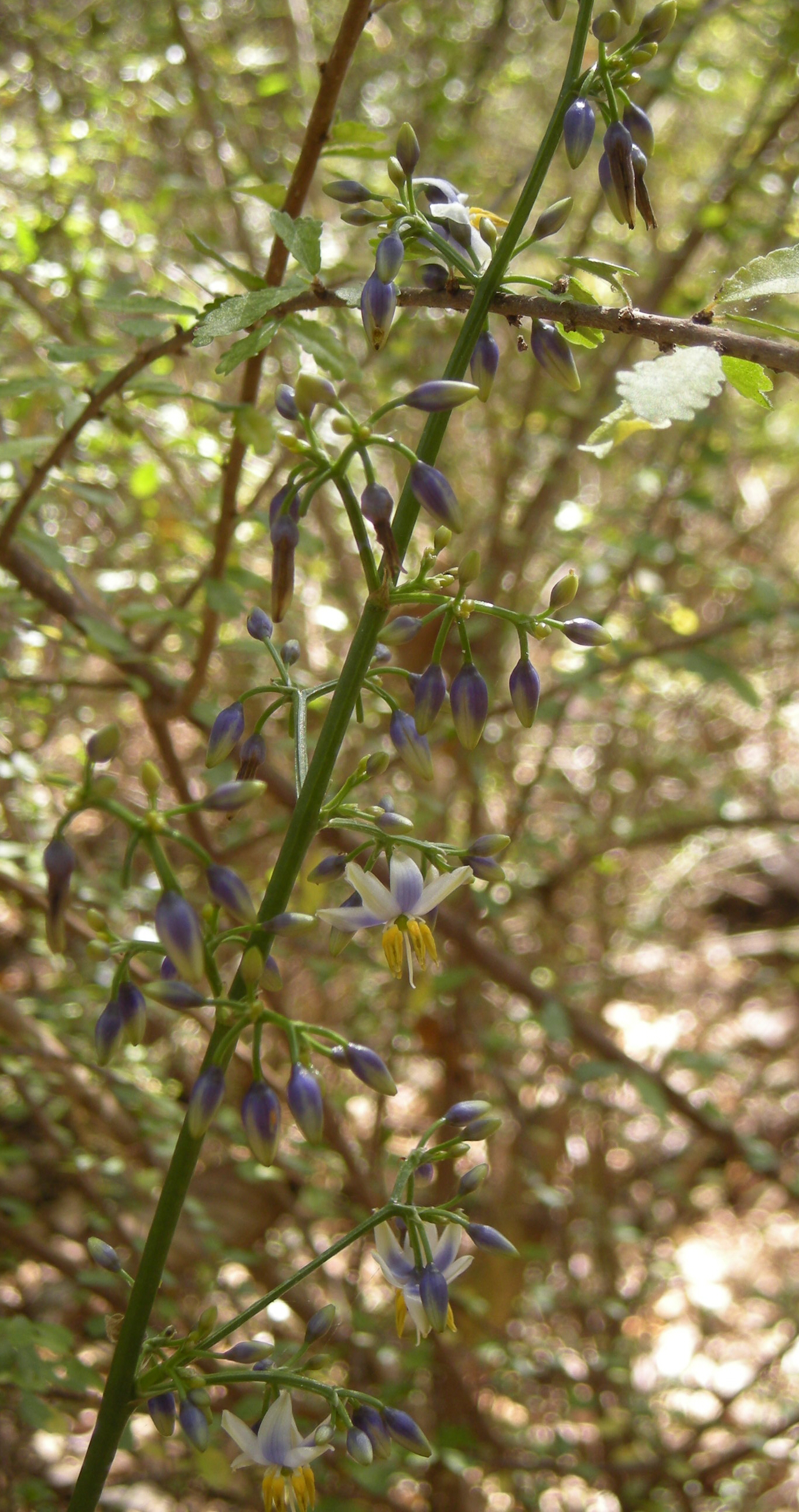
- Dianella sp.

Scientific classification
- Kingdom: Plantae
- Clade: Embryophytes
- Clade: Tracheophytes
- Clade: Spermatophytes
- Clade: Angiosperms
- Clade: Monocots
- Order: Asparagales
- Family: Asphodelaceae
- Subfamily: Hemerocallidoideae
- Genus: Dianella; Lam. ex Juss.

Synonyms
- Diana Comm. ex Lam.

= Dianella (plant) =

Genus of flowering plants

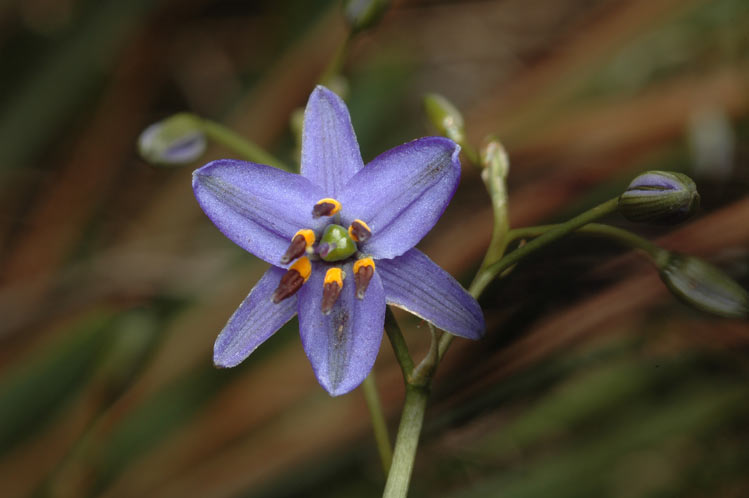
Dianella revoluta flower

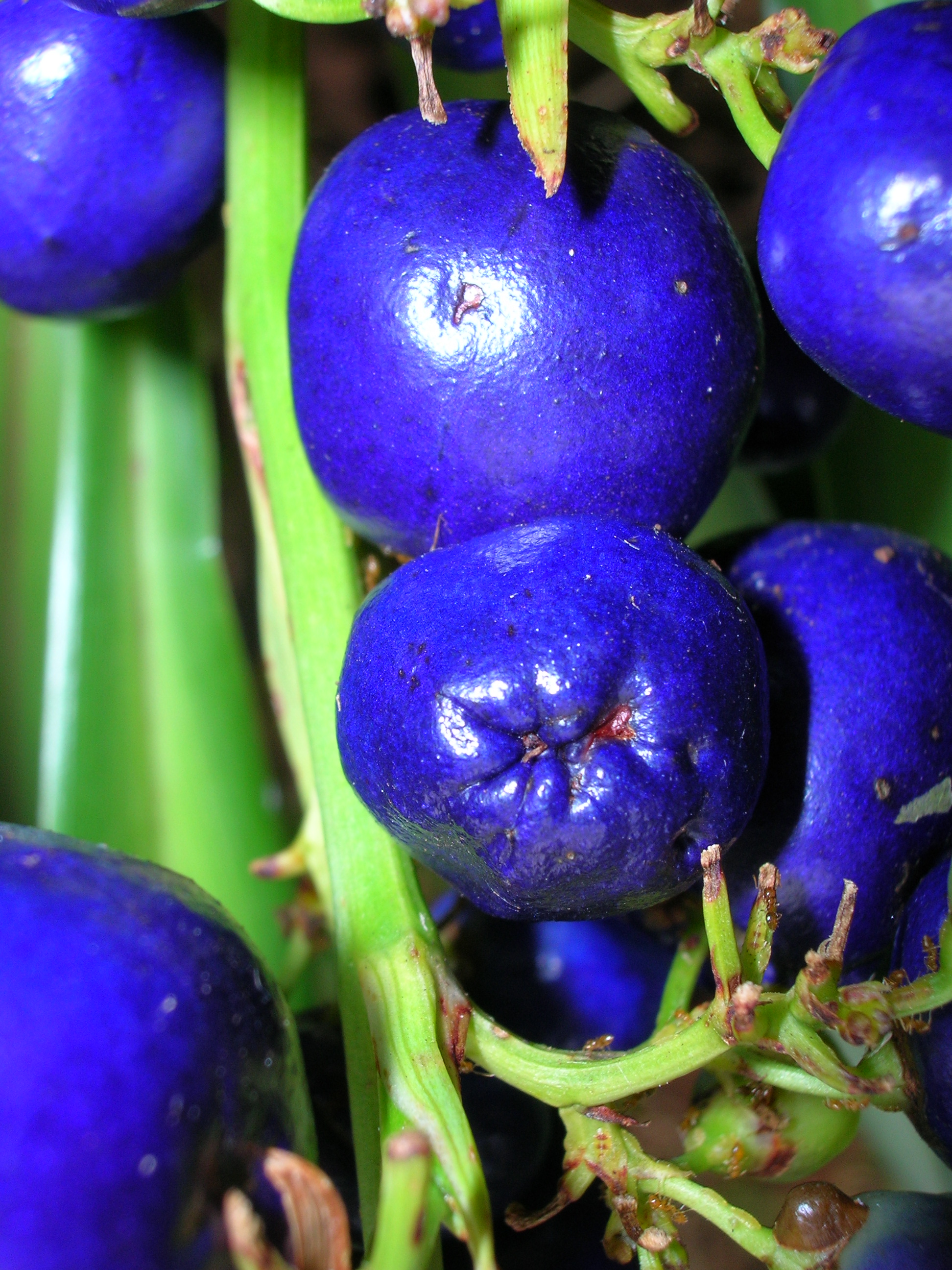
Dianella sandwicensis fruit

Dianella is a genus of about forty species of flowering plants in the monocot family Asphodelaceae, commonly known as flax lilies. Plants in this genus are tufted herbs with more or less linear leaves and bisexual flowers with three sepals more or less similar to three petals and a superior ovary, the fruit a berry. They occur in Africa, South-east Asia, the Pacific Islands, New Zealand and Australia.

Several species of this genus, or the whole genus, are sometimes referred to by the common name blue flax lily, particularly in Australia.

== Description ==
Plants in the genus Dianella are tufted perennial, rhizomatous herbs with fibrous or fleshy roots, more or less linear leaves with their bases overlapping, bisexual flowers with three sepals more or less similar to three blue, purple or white petals and a superior ovary, and the fruit a berry.

== Taxonomy ==
The name Dianella was first formally published by Jean-Baptiste Lamarck in 1786 in his Encyclopédie Méthodique, but this did not validly establish the name because Lamarck did not include a description of the new genus. Antoine Laurent de Jussieu made it a correct name in 1789 when he published a description in the first edition of his Genera Plantarum. The name Dianella is a reference to the Roman goddess Diana with the suffix ella meaning "small".

The genus Dianella is closely related to Thelionema and Herpolirion.

== Distribution and habitat ==
Plants in the genus Dianella occur in Africa, South-east Asia, the Pacific Islands including Hawaii, New Zealand and Australia. About half of the species are native to Australia.

== Species list ==
The following is a list of Dianella species accepted by Plants of the World Online as of June 2026:

- Dianella acutifolia Schlittler - New Caledonia
- Dianella adenanthera (G.Forst.) R.J.F.Hend. - numerous Pacific Islands
- Dianella amoena G.W.Carr & P.F.Horsfall - Tasmania, Victoria
- Dianella atraxis R.J.F.Hend. - Queensland
- Dianella bambusifolia Hallier f. - Queensland, New Guinea
- Dianella brevicaulis (Ostenf.) G.W.Carr & P.F.Horsfall - southern Australia
- Dianella brevipedunculata R.J.F.Hend. - Queensland
- Dianella caerulea Sims - New Guinea, eastern Australia
  - Dianella caerulea var. aquilonia R.J.F.Hend.
  - Dianella caerulea var. assera R.J.F.Hend.
  - Dianella caerulea Sims var. caerulea
  - Dianella caerulea var. cinerascans R.J.F.Hend.
  - Dianella caerulea var. petasmatodes R.J.F.Hend.
  - Dianella caerulea var. producta R.J.F.Hend.
  - Dianella caerulea var. protensa R.J.F.Hend.
  - Dianella caerulea var. vannata R.J.F.Hend.
- Dianella callicarpa G.W.Carr & P.F.Horsfall - Victoria
- Dianella carolinensis Lauterb. - Micronesia
- Dianella congesta R.Br. - Queensland, New South Wales
- Dianella crinoides R.J.F.Hend. - Queensland, New South Wales
- Dianella daenikeri Schlittler - New Caledonia
- Dianella dentata Schlittler - southeastern China
- Dianella ensifolia (L.) DC. (syn. D. ensata) Chimanimani Mountains of southern Africa; Indian Subcontinent, China, Madagascar, Southeast Asia, New Guinea, Solomon Islands, Japan, islands in Indian Ocean
- Dianella fruticans R.J.F.Hend. - Queensland
- Dianella haematica Heenan & de Lange - North Island of New Zealand
- Dianella incollata R.J.F.Hend. - Queensland
- Dianella intermedia Endl. - Norfolk Island of Australia
- Dianella latissima Heenan & de Lange - North Island of New Zealand
- Dianella lignosa R.L.Barrett & M.D.Barrett - Western Australia
- Dianella longifolia R.Br. - widespread in Australia
  - Dianella longifolia var. fragrans R.J.F.Hend.
  - Dianella longifolia var. grandis R.J.F.Hend.
  - Dianella longifolia R.Br. var. longifolia
  - Dianella longifolia var. stenophylla Domin
  - Dianella longifolia var. stupata R.J.F.Hend.
  - Dianella longifolia var. surculosa R.J.F.Hend.
- Dianella monophylla Hallier f. - New Guinea
- Dianella nervosa R.J.F.Hend. - Queensland, New South Wales
- Dianella nigra Colenso - North + South Islands of New Zealand
- Dianella odorata Blume - Maluku, Sulawesi, Sumatra, Queensland, Northern Territory
- Dianella pavopennacea R.J.F.Hend. - Queensland
  - Dianella pavopennacea var. major R.J.F.Hend.
  - Dianella pavopennacea R.J.F.Hend. var. pavopennacea
  - Dianella pavopennacea var. robusta R.J.F.Hend.
- Dianella pendula Schlittler - îles Loyauté of New Caledonia
- Dianella plicata Schlittler - New Caledonia
- Dianella porracea (R.J.F.Hend.) Horsfall & G.W.Carr - Queensland, New South Wales, South Australia
- Dianella prunina R.J.F.Hend. - New South Wales
- Dianella rara R.Br. - Queensland
- Dianella revoluta R.Br. - widespread in Australia
  - Dianella revoluta var. divaricata R.J.F.Hend.
  - Dianella revoluta var. minor R.J.F.Hend.
  - Dianella revoluta (R.Br.) R.J.F.Hend.var. revoluta
  - Dianella revoluta var. tenuis R.J.F.Hend.
  - Dianella revoluta var. vinosa R.J.F.Hend.
- Dianella saffordiana Fosberg & Sachet - Guam
- Dianella sandwicensis Hook. & Arn. - New Caledonia, Hawaiian Islands, Marquesas
- Dianella serrulata Hallier f. - Queensland, New Guinea
- Dianella stipitata Schlittler - New Caledonia
- Dianella tarda Horsfall & G.W.Carr - New South Wales, Victoria
- Dianella tasmanica Hook.f. - Tasmania, Victoria, New South Wales
- Dianella tenuissima G.W.Carr - New South Wales

== Uses ==
Several species of Dianella are grown for their attractive foliage and shiny, blue to purple berries.

Reports of the edibility of the fruit range from very poisonous to sweet and nutty (such as D. caerulea), and the beach flax lily (D. congesta) is reportedly the best-tasting.

The leaves are used to weave dillies and baskets by Indigenous Australians.

== See also ==
- List of plants known as lily
