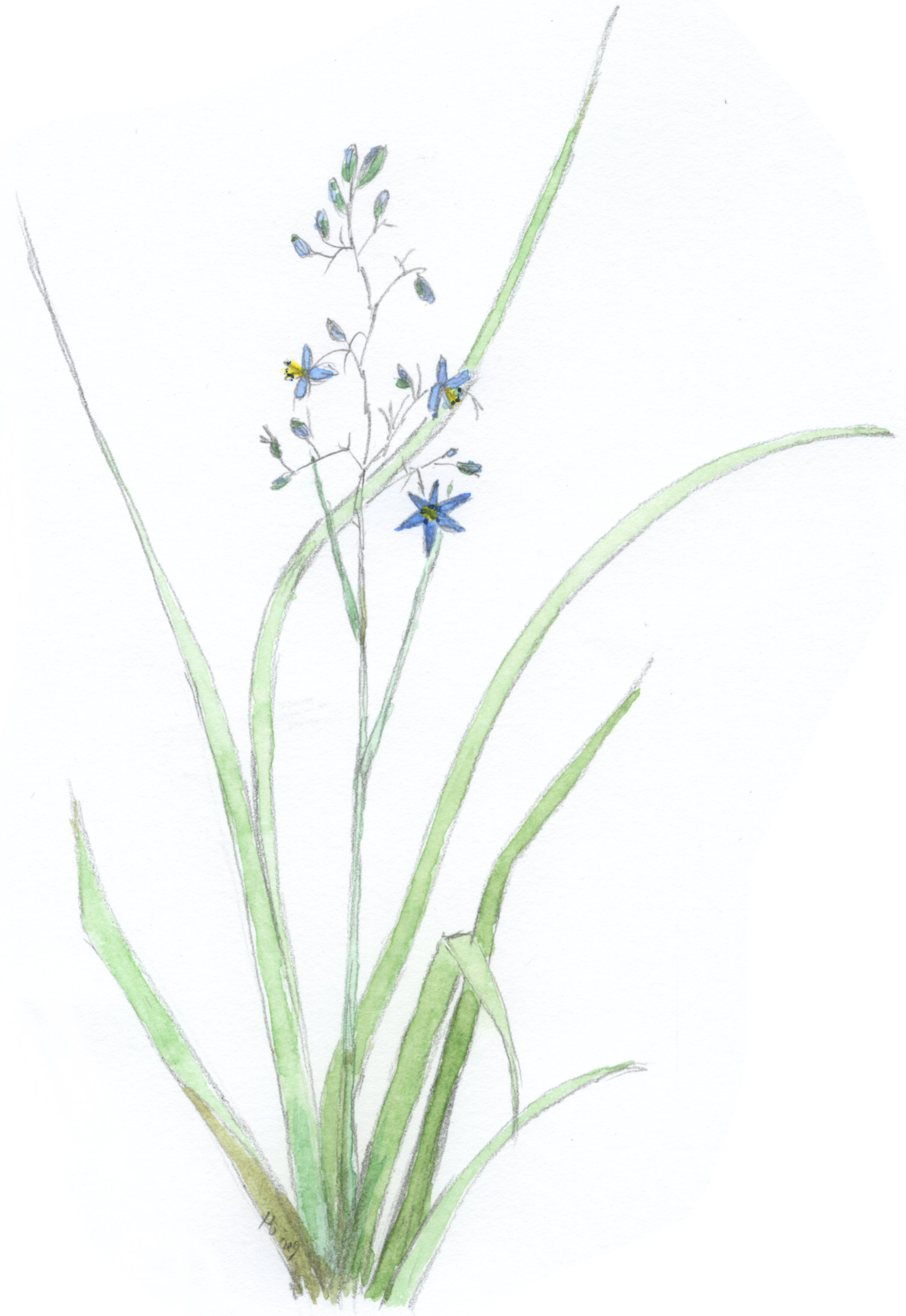

Scientific classification
- Kingdom: Plantae
- Clade: Tracheophytes
- Clade: Angiosperms
- Clade: Monocots
- Order: Asparagales
- Family: Asphodelaceae
- Subfamily: Hemerocallidoideae
- Genus: Dianella
- Species: D. ensifolia

Binomial name
- Dianella ensifolia (L.) Redouté

= Dianella ensifolia =

Species of flax lily

Dianella ensifolia is a flowering plant, of the family Asphodelaceae. It is native to southern China, India, Japan, Madagascar, Malesia, the Pacific Islands, Singapore, Sri Lanka, Taiwan, and tropical Asia. Its common names include umbrella dracaena, common dianella, siak-siak, and flax lily.

== Description ==
Dianella ensifolia is a terrestrial plant that can grow in grasslands, or primary rainforests in tropical areas. The plant's anatomy consists of branching rhizomes, and flowering stems, that can reach up to two meters. Its leaf blades are pointed and tapered at both ends. When flowering, it produces a shoot about 60 cm (23.6 in) long. It has white petals, with orange/yellow anthers. Once it is pollinated by insects, it will produce berries that are dark blue/purple, and about 1.5 cm (0.59 in) wide. These berries contain 3-6 seeds, that are often eaten by native birds.

== Common names ==
Other common names for Dianella ensifolia include umbrella dracaena, common dianella, and flax lily.

== Etymology ==
The Latin name Dianella is after Diana, a goddess in Greek mythology. Further, the Latin ensifolia is used to regard the sword-shaped leaves of the plant.

== Phytochemical properties and chemotaxonomic significance ==
A 2017 study investigated the roots of the Dianella ensifolia, and was able to isolate eleven compounds. When broken into groups, this would constitute two aromatics, two chromones, and 7 flavonoids.

The compounds found in D. ensifolia can be correlated with different taxonomic levels, including the species, genus, and family. The research concluded the structural skeletons of the compounds found in the D. ensifolia, are found within the species of Dianella, and Liliaceae. This would correlate the species to the genus. Further, the aromatics, chromones, and flavonoids were first isolated from the species itself of the genus, and thus, could serve as markers for the identification of Dianella ensifolia.

== Chemical composition and medicinal use of essential oil ==
In 2020 essential oil of the D. ensifolia was chemically analyzed, and tested for its antibacterial, antioxidant, and cytotoxic properties. The main components of the plant essential oil were identified as allo-aromadendrene (7.3%), Geranylacetone (6.2%), Hexahydrofarnesyl acetone (4.4%), Longifolene (4.2%), and β-caryophyllene (4.0%).

When examined individually, these compounds exhibit potent antimicrobial activity, cytotoxic activity, the potential to inhibit cell growth and proliferation, and in-vivo protective effects against juglone-induced oxidative stress in roundworm.

The essential oil was investigated further for its antibacterial activity, and it was determined that it effectively inhibited the growth of numerous bacterial strains, including Bacillus subtilis ATCC 6633 and Staphylococcus aureus ATCC 6538. This effect was associated with the compounds geranylacetone, hexahydrofarnesyl acetone, longifolene, and β-caryophyllene, found in the essential oil.

The cytotoxicity of the essential oil was also examined against liver hepatocellular cells, and human breast adenocarcinoma cell line. The essential oil of the D. ensifolia displayed a dose-dependent effect on both tumor cell lines. This may be contributed to the reported tumor motility inhibition, and tumor aggression inhibition of β-caryophyllene.

== Extract medicinal use ==
A study conducted in 2010 screened plant extracts for antioxidants, and determined that the extract of Dianella ensifolia was both a strong antioxidant, and an agent that could be used to reduce skin hyperpigmentation. The extract of Dianella ensifolia, 1-(2,4-dihydrophenyl)-3-(2,4- dimethoxy-3-methylphenyl) propane (DP), was found to inhibit a free radical, which is linked to hyperpigmentation, and ultraviolet-C induced lipid oxidation. The extract from the plant was then tested against two pharmaceutical topical treatments. It was concluded that the plant extract, containing DP, had an increased rate of fading compared to the other treatments containing hydroquinone.
