= Dianella odorata =

Conservation status
- Least Concern (NCA)

Scientific classification
- Kingdom: Plantae
- Clade: Tracheophytes
- Clade: Angiosperms
- Clade: Monocots
- Order: Asparagales
- Family: Asphodelaceae
- Subfamily: Hemerocallidoideae
- Genus: Dianella
- Species: D. odorata

Binomial name
- Dianella odorata Blume

Synonyms
- Dianella bancana Miq.; Dianella odorata f. bancana (Miq.) Schlittler; Dianella odorata f. indica Schlittler; Dianella odorata f. lorifolia Schlittler; Dianella odorata f. spinulosa Schlittler

Species of flowering plant

Dianella odorata is a species of flowering plant in the family Asphodelaceae. It is a subshrub or shrub with blue or violet flowers, and blue or purple berries. The species is native to parts of Indonesia, Papua New Guinea and northern Australia, and was described in 1827.

== Taxonomy ==
The species was described by Carl Ludwig Blume in 1827.

== Distribution ==
Dianella odorata is native to the wet tropical biome of the Maluku Islands, New Guinea, Sulawesi, Sumatra, and Australia (Northern Territory and Queensland). It grows on loam, in eucalypt forests and woodlands, at elevations of up to 180 metres (590 ft).

== Description ==
Dianella odorata is a subshrub or shrub that grows up to 1.25 metres (4.1 ft) tall. The stems are up to 80 centimetres (31 in) tall. The roots are fibrous. The leaves are 19–40 centimetres (7.5–15.7 in) long, and 0.9–2.2 centimetres (0.35–0.87 in) wide.

The inflorescence is narrowly cylindrical in outline, and usually has three to six flowers. The flower stems are 12–25 millimetres (0.47–0.98 in) long. The perianth has blue to violet segments, which are ovate to elliptical or obtuse. The sepals are 7.5–8.5 millimetres (0.30–0.33 in) long, and have five to seven nerves. The petals are 6.5–8 millimetres (0.26–0.31 in) long, and have five nerves. The plant flowers all year round, except for December.

Berries

The fruit is a blue or purple, 5–8 millimetres (0.20–0.31 in) long berry. The seeds are black, shiny, and 3.5–4 millimetres (0.14–0.16 in) long. The plant fruits in February, April, May, June, July, August, September, October, and November.

Dianella odorata is similar to Dianella longifolia.
