= Systematics and Biodiversity =

- Discipline: Biodiversity
- Language: English

Publication details
- Publisher: Taylor and Francis on behalf of The Natural History Museum
- Impact factor: 2.313 (2021)

Standard abbreviations
- ISO 4: Syst. Biodivers.

Indexing
- ISSN: 1477-2000 (print); 1478-0933 (web)
- OCLC no.: 52503894

Links
- Journal homepage

Systematics and Biodiversity is a peer-reviewed scientific journal covering all aspects of whole-organism biology. It is published by Taylor & Francis on behalf of the Natural History Museum.

== Abstracting and indexing ==
The journal is abstracted or indexed in:

- Science Citation Index Expanded
- Scopus
- EBSCO databases
- ProQuest databases

According to the Journal Citation Reports, the journal has a 2021 impact factor of 2.313.
