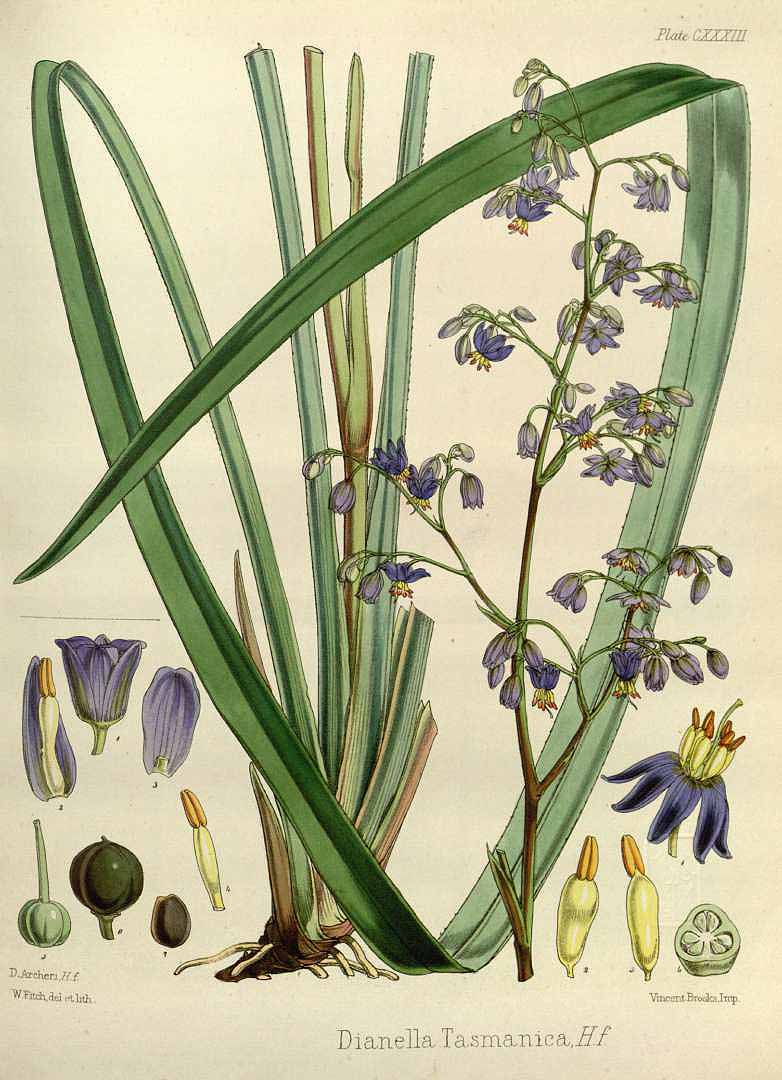
- Dianella tasmanica (artist:W.H.Fitch)
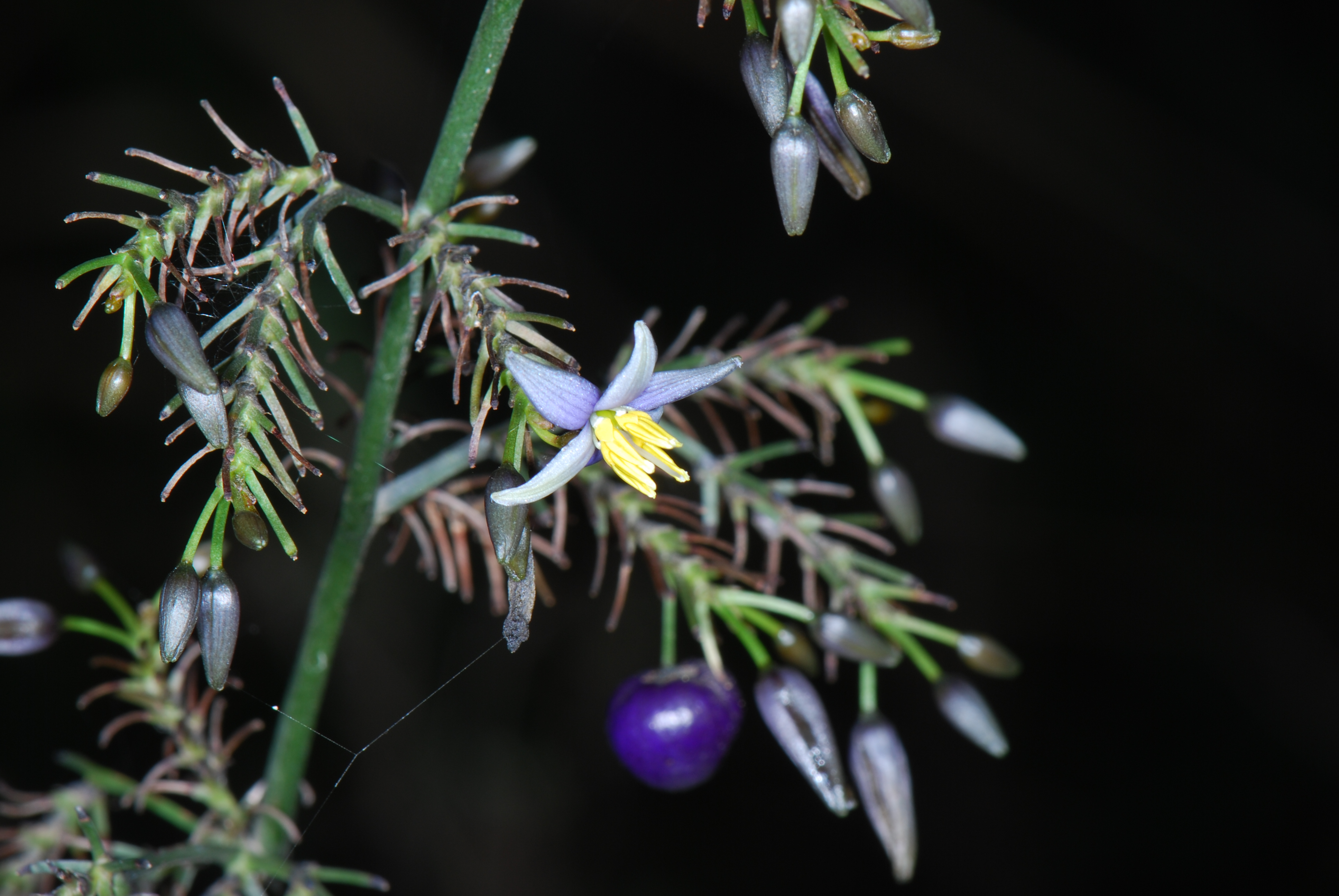

Scientific classification
- Kingdom: Plantae
- Clade: Tracheophytes
- Clade: Angiosperms
- Clade: Monocots
- Order: Asparagales
- Family: Asphodelaceae
- Subfamily: Hemerocallidoideae
- Genus: Dianella
- Species: D. tasmanica

Binomial name
- Dianella tasmanica Hook.f.

= Dianella tasmanica =

Species of flowering plant

Dianella tasmanica, commonly known as the Tasman flax-lily or Tasmanian flax-lily, is a herbaceous strappy perennial herb of the family Asphodelaceae, subfamily Hemerocallidoideae, found in southeastern Australia including Tasmania. Its leaves are up to 80 centimetres (30 inches) in length, and the flower stem is up to 1.5 m (4 ft 11 in) tall. Blue flowers in spring and summer are followed by violet berries. It adapts readily to cultivation and is commonly seen in Australian gardens. Unlike other Dianella species, its fruits are toxic.

== Taxonomy ==
Dianella tasmanica was first described in 1858 by eminent English botanist and explorer Joseph Dalton Hooker. The genus name is derived from the Roman goddess Diana, with a diminutive suffix -ella.

== Description ==
Dianella tasmanica is a strappy herbaceous plant which grows to 0.5–2 metres (1–7 ft) high and wide, with a thick spreading rhizome under the ground. The green linear keeled leaves have finely toothed margins, and may reach 1 m (40 in) in length and 1.5–4 cm wide. The small (1.5 cm diameter) blue flowers bloom in spring and summer (August to February), and are followed by small roughly oval or globular violet berries which range from about 1.2 cm (0.5 in) in diameter.

== Distribution and habitat ==
Found southwards from Dorrigo in New South Wales, and into Victoria and Tasmania, Dianella tasmanica grows singly or in clumps in shady spots in wet forests.

== Cultivation ==
Dianella tasmanica is a hardy plant which has been cultivated in gardens and as a pot plant for many years in Australia, preferring shade and regular moisture. It can also be grown as an indoor plant, in a brightly lit space. A form with variegated leaves known as "Rainbow" is in cultivation, as well as a compact form "Little Devil", and a salt-tolerant form with red-tinged leaves.

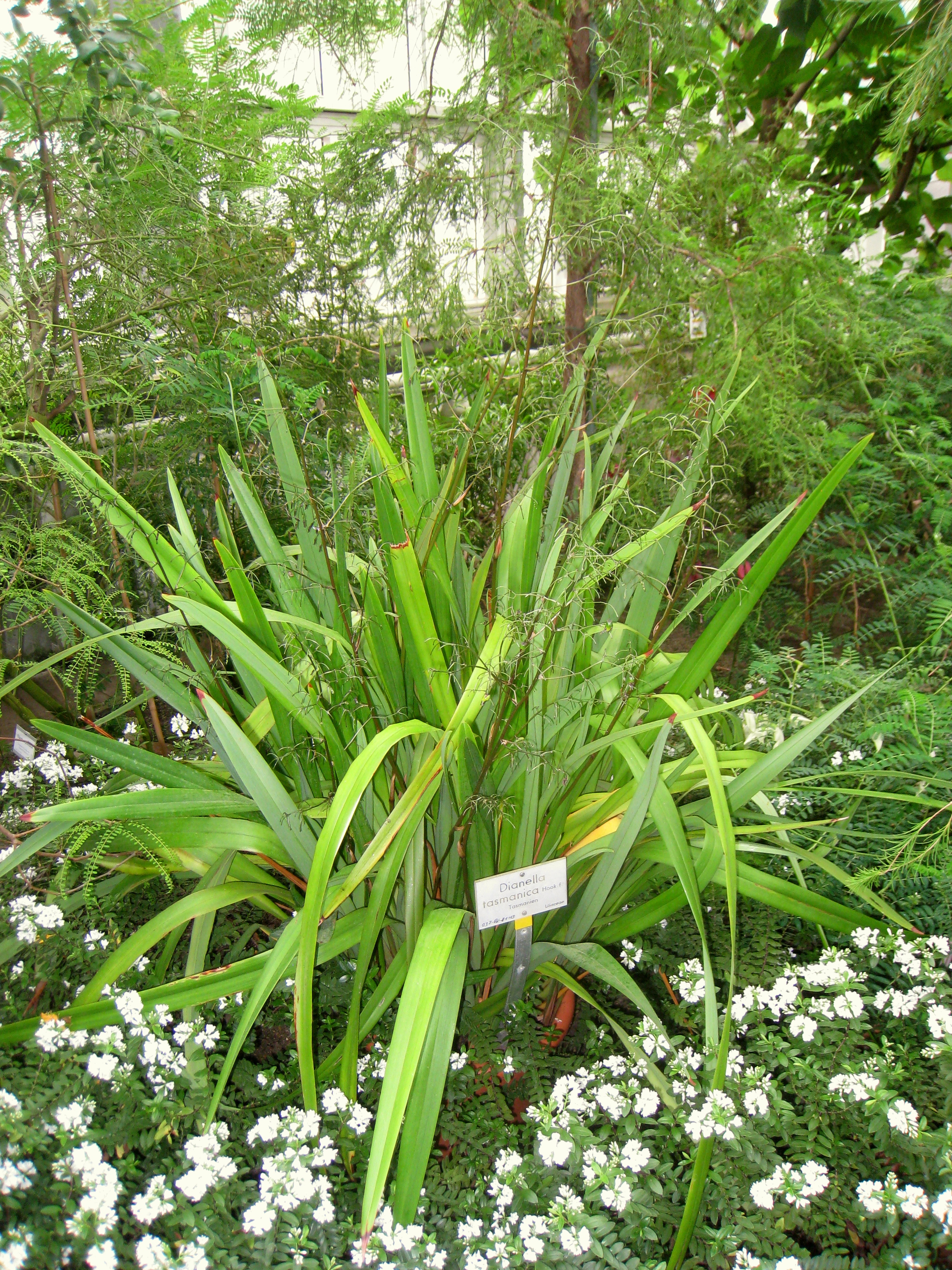
foliage

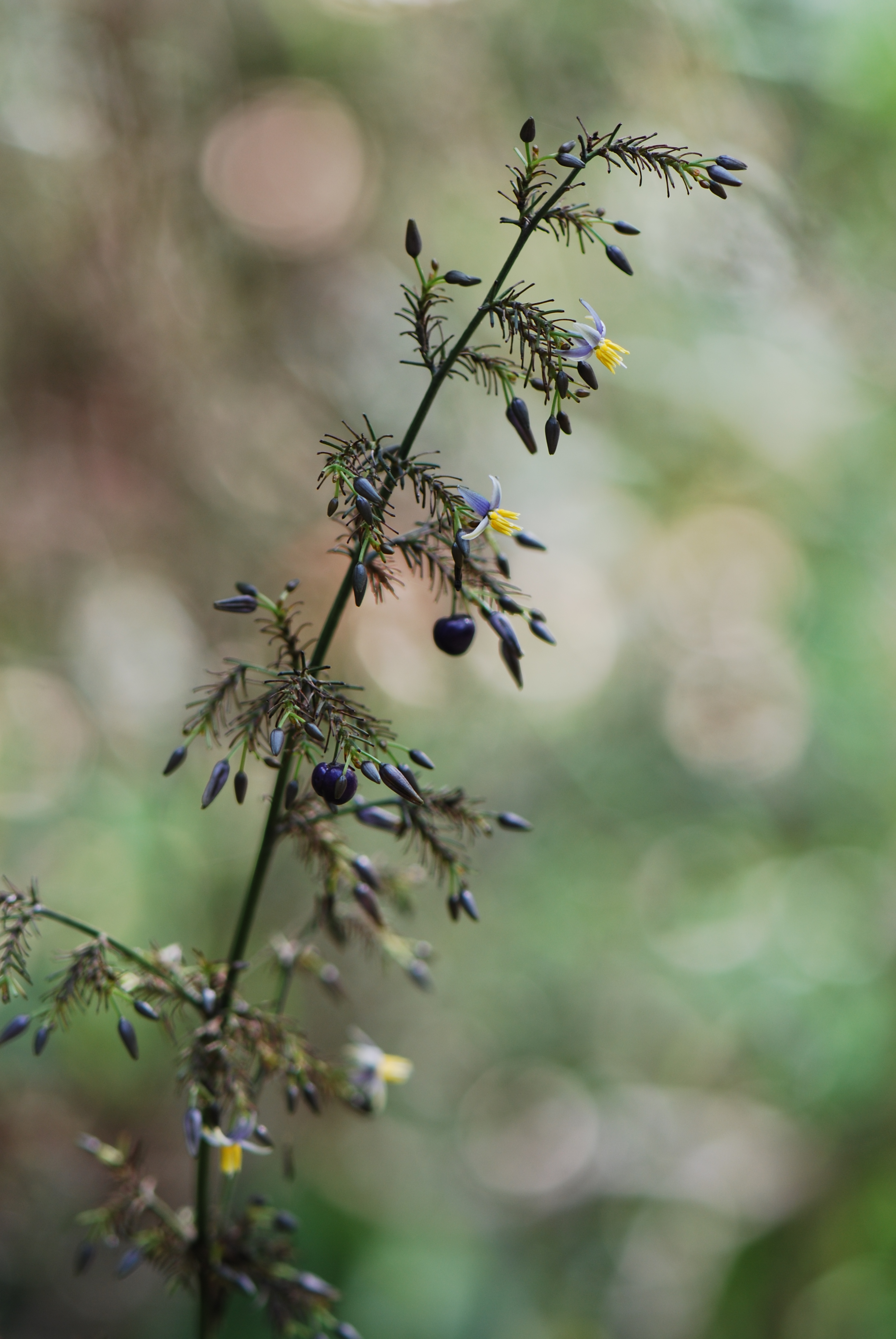
flower stem

== Uses ==
The fruits of Dianella tasmanica are toxic to an unknown degree and should not be eaten. They are markedly larger than the fruits of other Dianella species, and produce an irritating tingling sensation in the mouth when consumed. The fruits have reportedly been used by Aboriginal peoples to dye baskets, and the leaves may be used for weaving.
