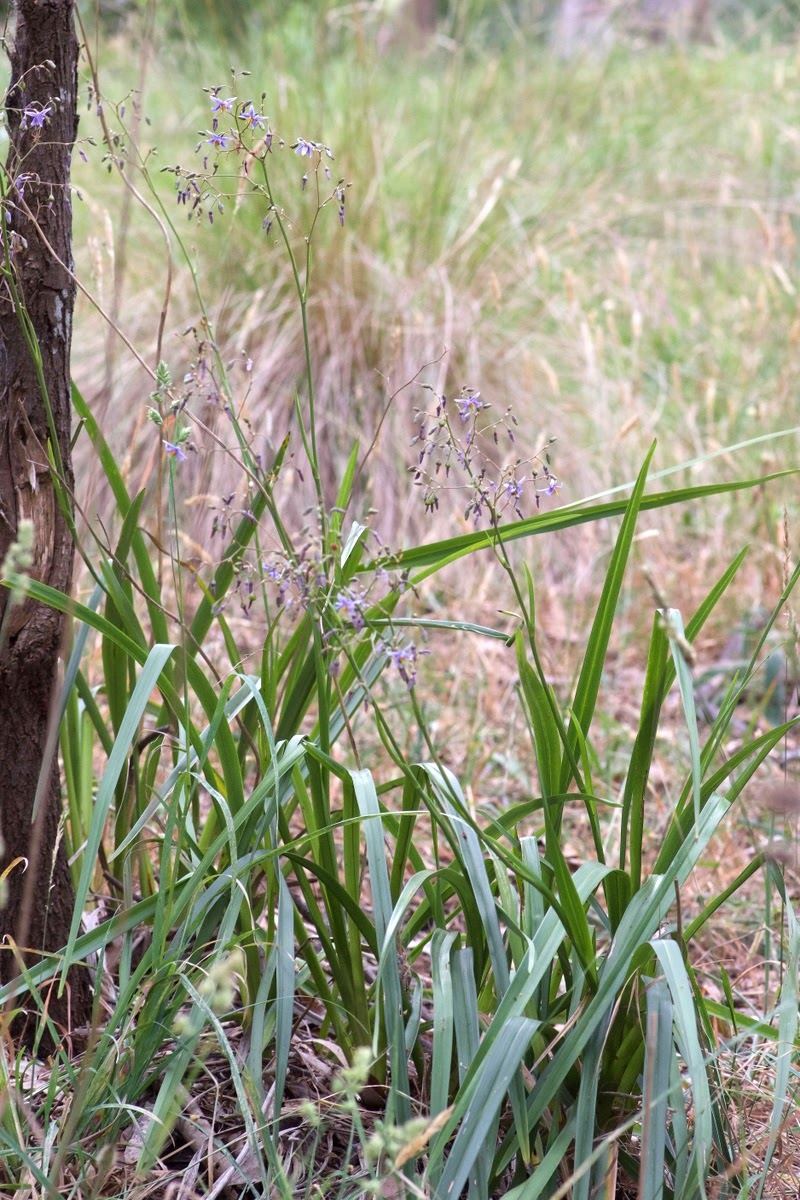

Scientific classification
- Kingdom: Plantae
- Clade: Tracheophytes
- Clade: Angiosperms
- Clade: Monocots
- Order: Asparagales
- Family: Asphodelaceae
- Subfamily: Hemerocallidoideae
- Genus: Dianella
- Species: D. longifolia

Binomial name
- Dianella longifolia R.Br.

= Dianella longifolia =

Blueberry lily

Specie of flowering plants

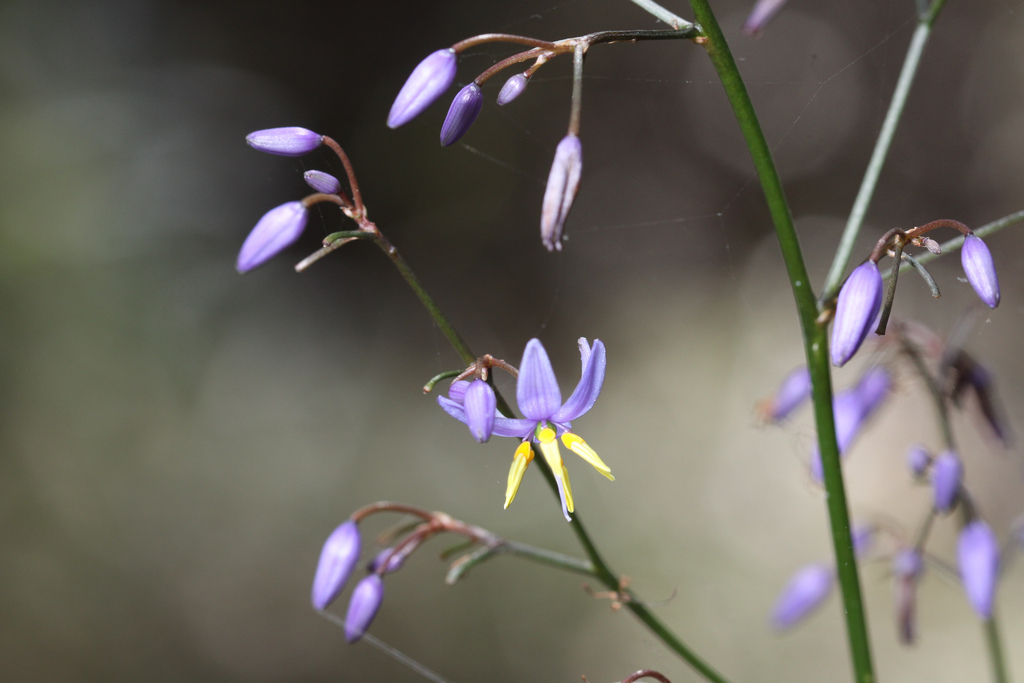
Inflorescence, near the Lane Cove River

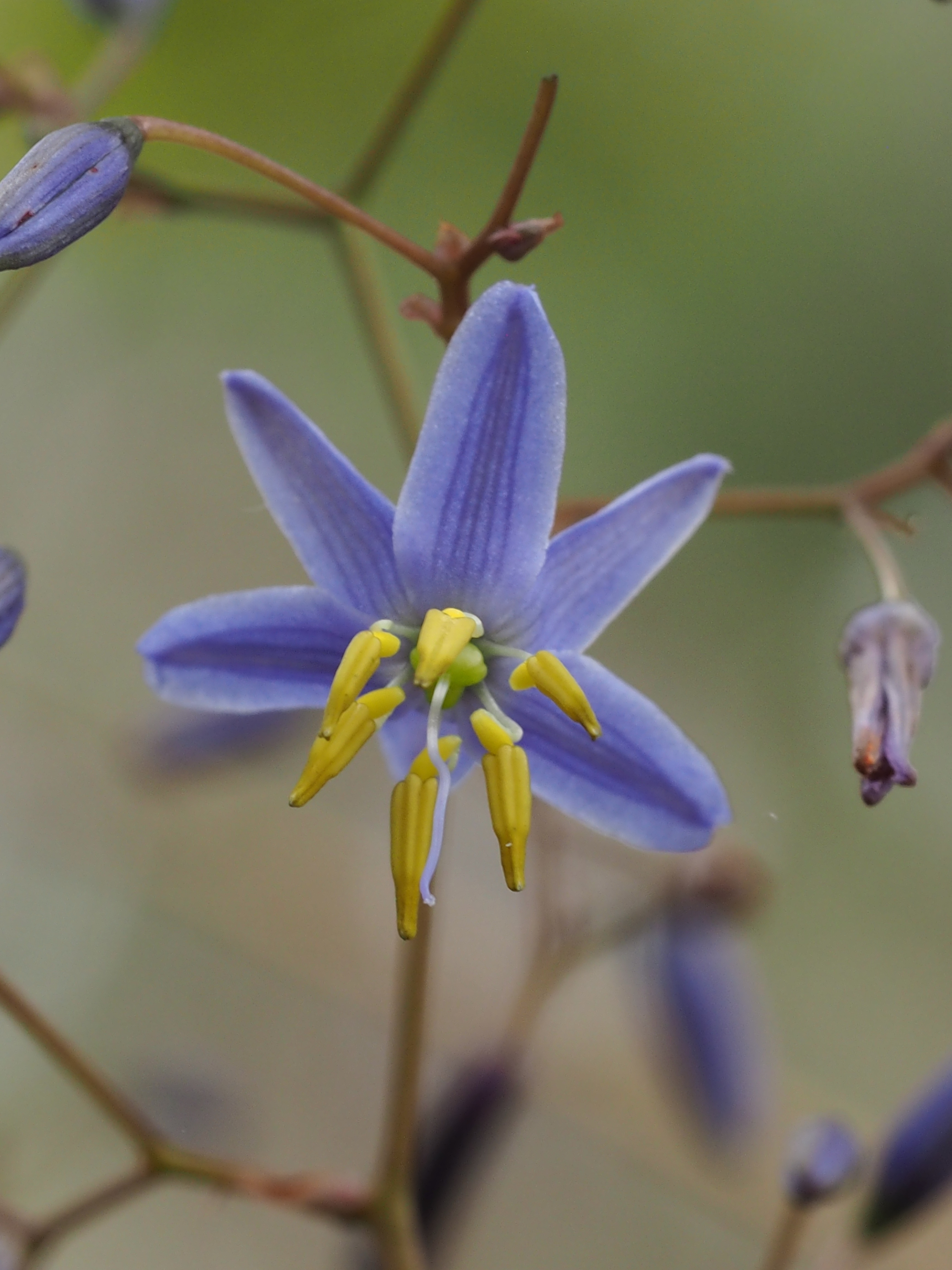
Var. longifolia flower detail, near Wollomombi Falls

Dianella longifolia, commonly known as blueberry lily, pale flax lily or smooth flax lily, or blue flax-lily, (although other species, or the whole genus Dianella are also referred to by this last name) is a species of flowering plant in the family Asphodelaceae and is endemic to non-arid areas of Australia. It is a tufted, rhizomatous, perennial herb with grass-like leaves, pale blue, white or greenish flowers that have pale yellow anthers, and shiny, pale blue berries.

== Description ==
Dianella longifolia is a rhizomatous, perennial herb that forms tufts up to about 1.5 m (4 ft 11 in) tall and has stems less than 10 cm (3.9 in) long. The leaves are folded lengthwise, grass-like, and 20–80 cm (7.9–31.5 in) long with a rounded to keeled sheath and 2–25 mm (0.079–0.984 in) wide. The inflorescence is longer than the leaves, the flowers pale blue, white or greenish and well separated from each other, each on a pedicel 7–16 mm (0.28–0.63 in) long. The three outer tepals are 6–10 mm (0.24–0.39 in) and the inner tepals 5.5–9 mm (0.22–0.35 in) long, each with five veins. The stamens have filament swellings 1–2.3 mm (0.039–0.091 in) long and yellow anthers. Flowering occurs in spring and summer and the fruit is a pale blue berry 3–7 mm (0.12–0.28 in) long.

== Taxonomy and naming ==
Dianella longifolia was first described in 1810 by Robert Brown in his Prodromus Florae Novae Hollandiae et Insulae Van Diemen. The specific epithet (longifolia) is derived from Latin, meaning "long leaved".

Six varieties of D. longifolia have been described and accepted by the Australian Plant Census:

- Dianella longifolia var. fragrans R.J.F.Henderson that is only known from two collections from near Cardwell;
- Dianella longifolia var. grandis R.J.F.Henderson that is widespread in south-eastern Australia, from near Gympie to north of Adelaide;
- Dianella longifolia R.Br. var. longifolia, found throughout northern and eastern Australia, including the Kimberley region of Western Australia;
- Dianella longifolia var. stenophylla Domin in eastern Australia from near Gladstone to near Batemans Bay;
- Dianella longifolia var. stupata R.J.F.Henderson found mostly west of the Great Dividing Range in eastern Australia;
- Dianella longifolia var. surculosa R.J.F.Henderson that occurs in south-eastern Queensland and north-eastern New South Wales.

== Distribution and habitat ==
Blueberry lily is widespread and common in non-arid parts of Australia, including the Kimberley region, eastern and southern Australia and northern Tasmania.
