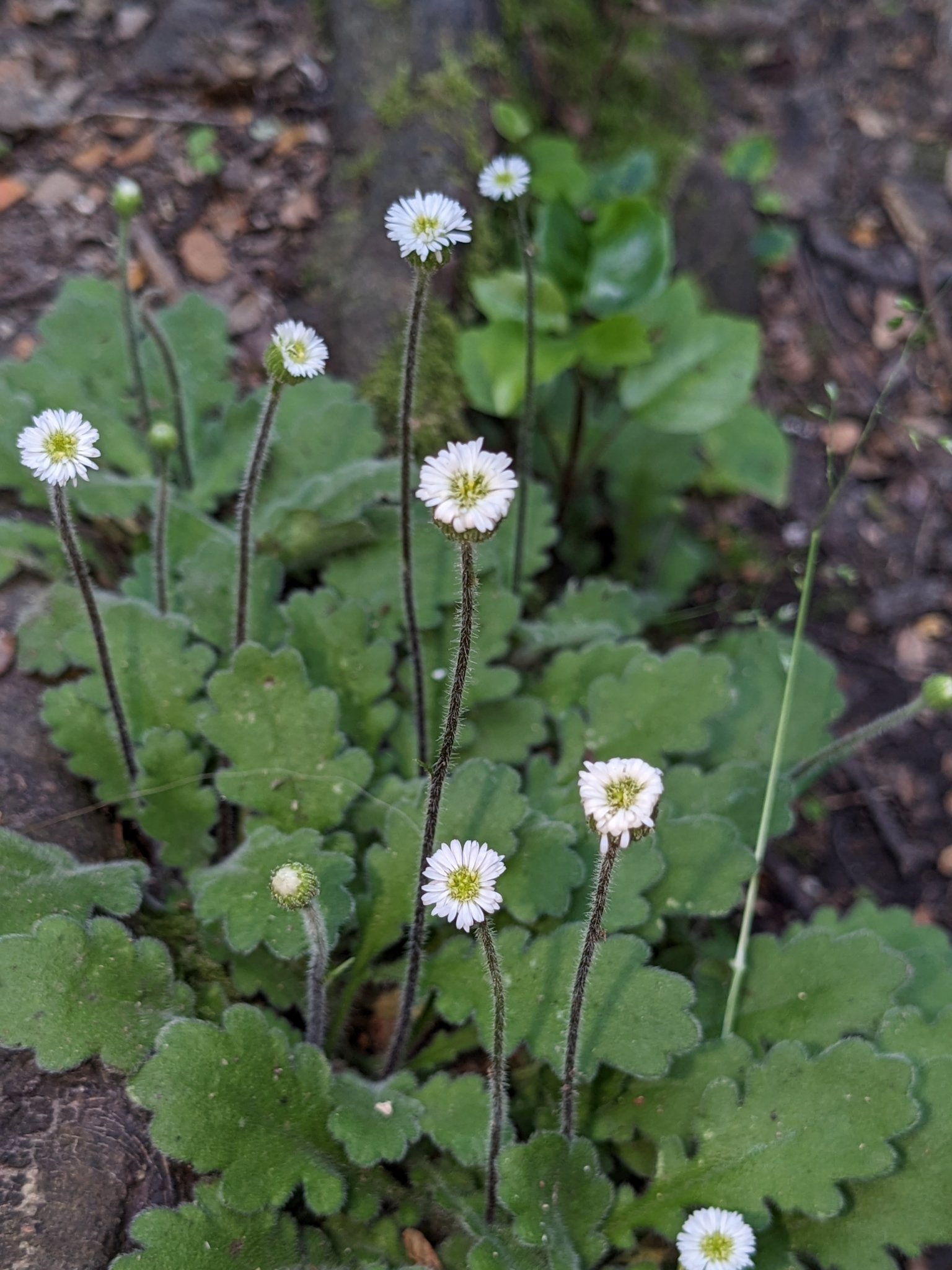
- Lagenophora pinnatifida in Kowai Bush

Conservation status
- Not Threatened (NZ TCS)

Scientific classification
- Kingdom: Plantae
- Clade: Embryophytes
- Clade: Tracheophytes
- Clade: Angiosperms
- Clade: Eudicots
- Clade: Asterids
- Order: Asterales
- Family: Asteraceae
- Genus: Lagenophora
- Species: L. pinnatifida

Binomial name
- Lagenophora pinnatifida Hook.f.

= Lagenophora pinnatifida =

Species of flowering plant

Lagenophora pinnatifida is a species of flowering plant, endemic to New Zealand. It was described by Joseph Hooker in 1853. It is not considered threatened, except in the area of Otago.

It may form a species complex with Lagenophora stipitata.

== Description ==
The flowers are white. The involucre and ray floret length is slightly smaller than the related Lagenophora hirsuta.

There are two varieties. The chromosome pattern is 2n=18.

== Distribution and habitat ==
This species is known from both the North and the South Island. It frequents the margins of water bodies like lakes and streams, and the margins of beech forests. On the North Island, it grows up to 1,200 m (3,900 ft) in elevation, but up to 1,400 m (4,600 ft) on the South Island.

== Ecology ==
It is associated with mountain beech forests, and frequently grows with Halocarpus bidwillii. Near Nelson, it can be found in manuka scrub.

== Etymology ==
Pinnatifida means "pinnately divided, finely cut" in Latin.
