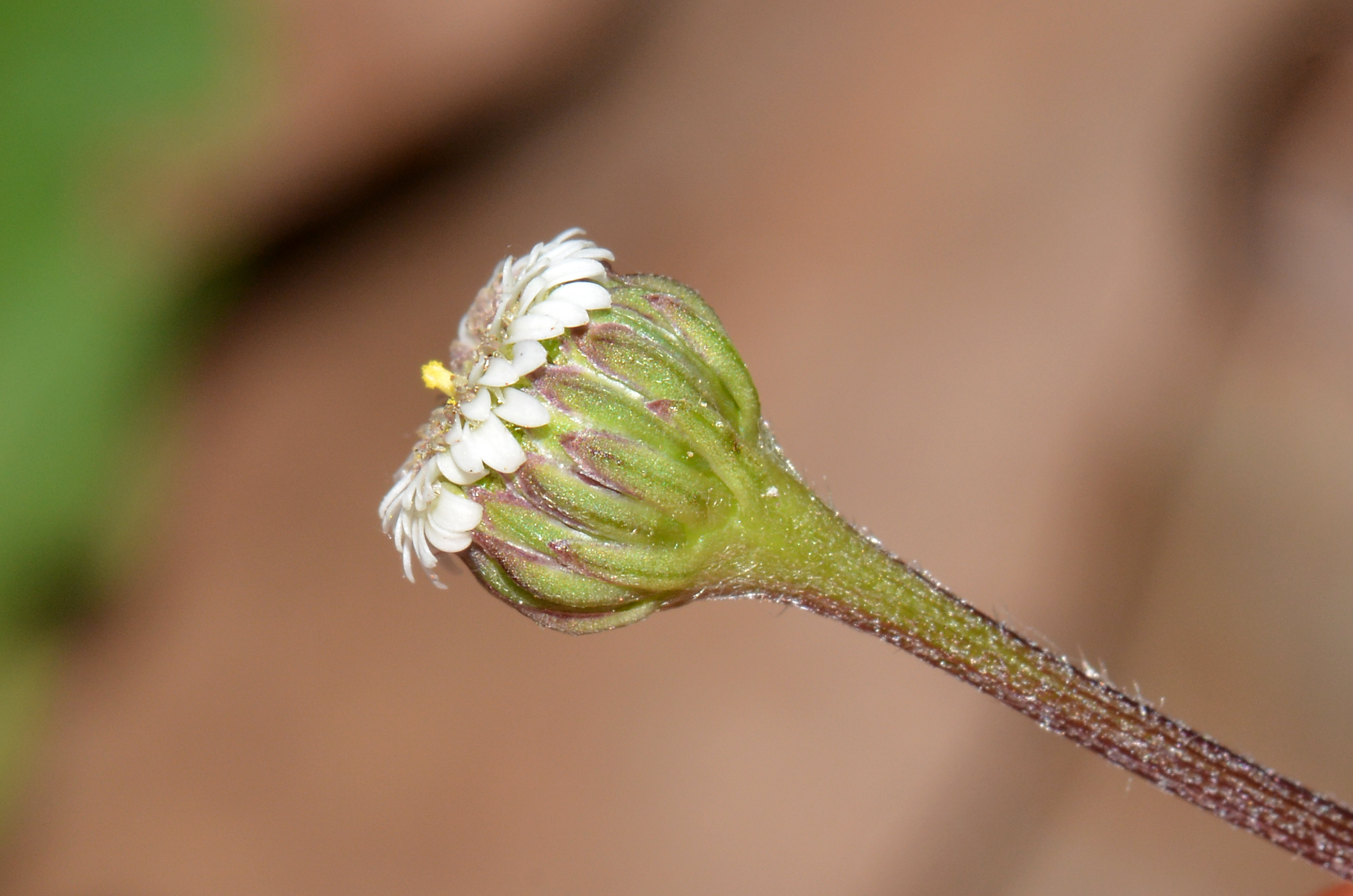

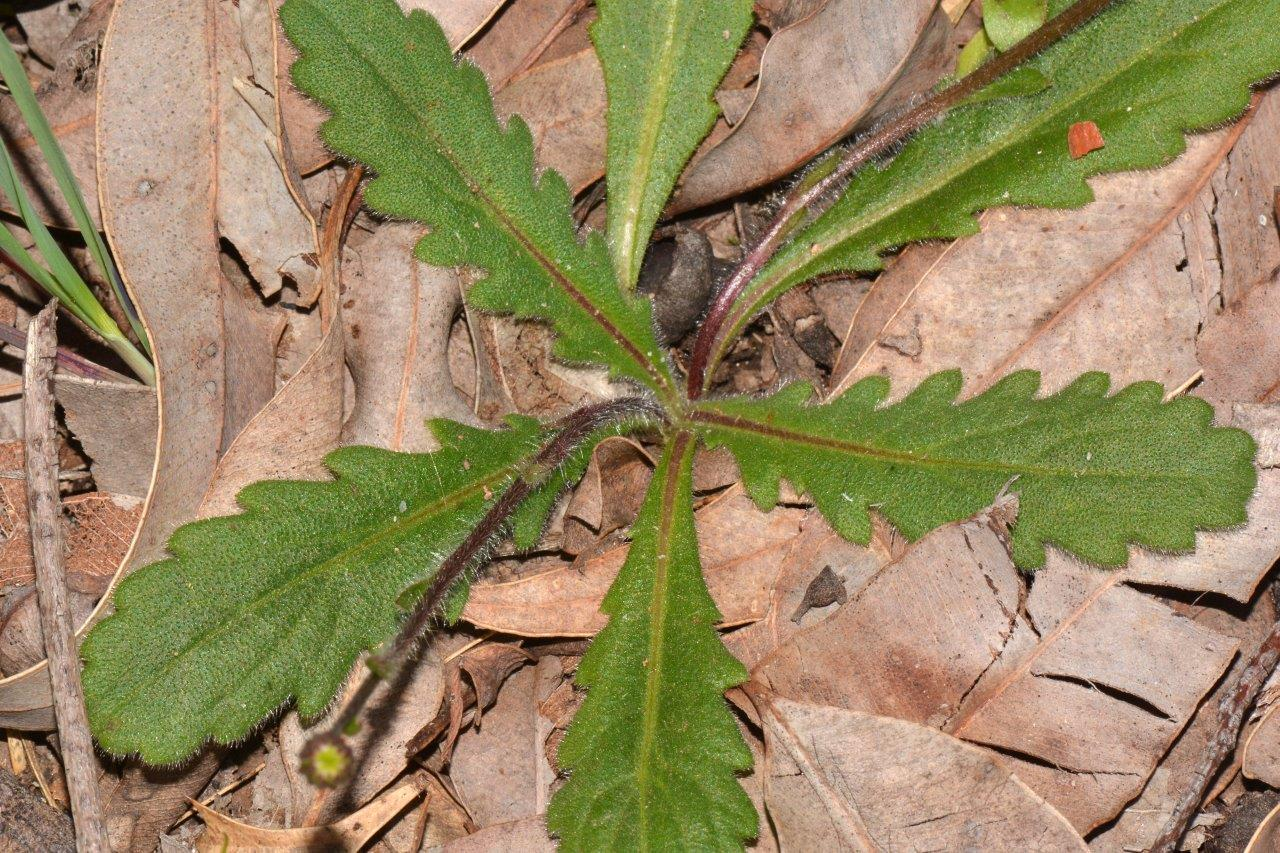

Scientific classification
- Kingdom: Plantae
- Clade: Tracheophytes
- Clade: Angiosperms
- Clade: Eudicots
- Clade: Asterids
- Order: Asterales
- Family: Asteraceae
- Genus: Lagenophora
- Species: L. huegelii

Binomial name
- Lagenophora huegelii Benth

= Lagenophora huegelii =

Species of flowering plant in the sunflower family

Lagenophora huegelii is a species of flowering plant in the family Asteraceae which is endemic to Western Australia. It was formerly considered to also grow in eastern Australia and Tasmania, though these populations are considered a separate species: Lagenophora gunniana.

It was first described in 1837 by George Bentham from specimens described as being collected by Baron Carl von Hügel and coming from the Swan River and King Georges Sound.
