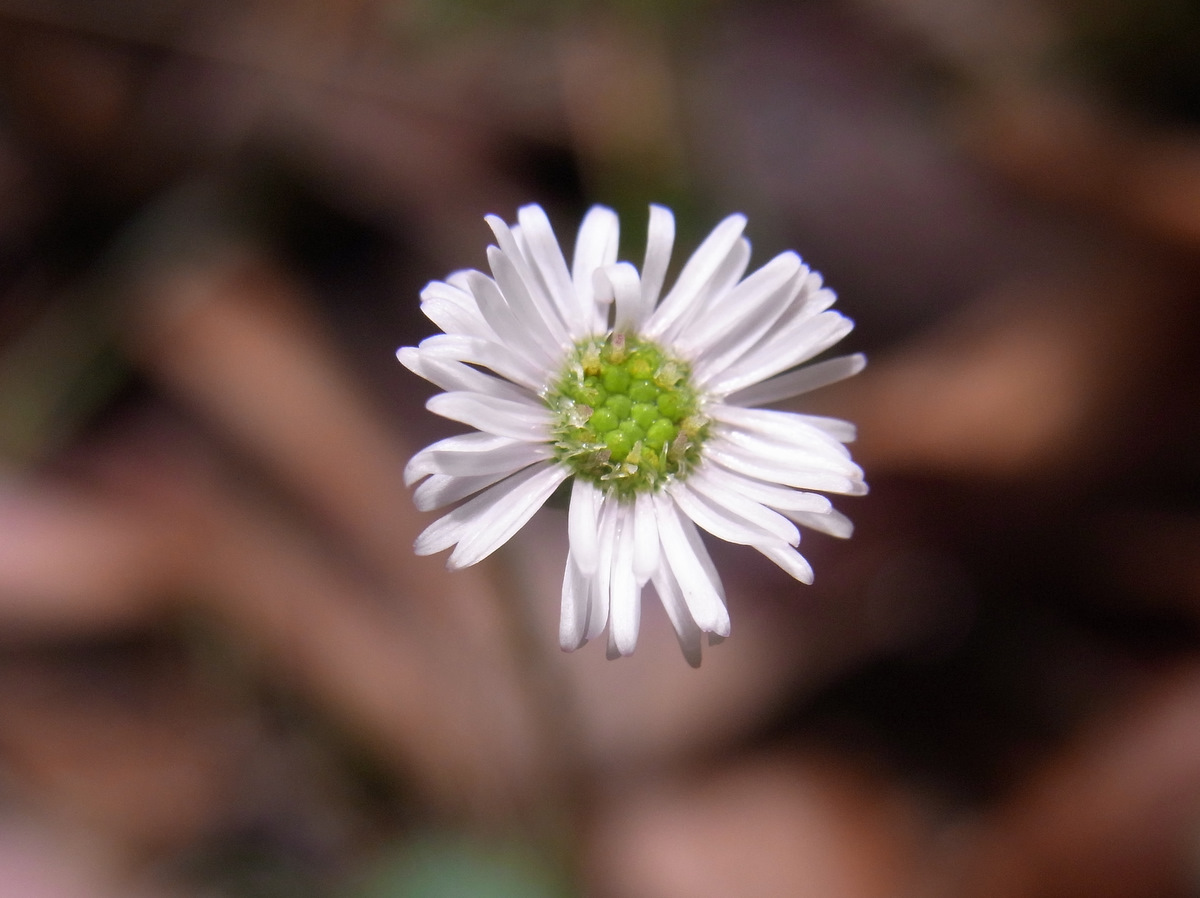
- Lagenophora gracilis

Scientific classification
- Kingdom: Plantae
- Clade: Tracheophytes
- Clade: Angiosperms
- Clade: Eudicots
- Clade: Asterids
- Order: Asterales
- Family: Asteraceae
- Subfamily: Asteroideae
- Tribe: Astereae
- Subtribe: Lagenophorinae
- Genus: Lagenophora; Cass.

Synonyms
- List: Lagenifera Cass., alternate spelling; Keysseria sect. Eukeysseria Mattf.; Myriactis subg. Hecatactis F.Muell.; Keysseria sect. Hecatactis Mattf.; Ixauchenus Cass.; Microcalia A.Rich.; Hecatactis F.Muell. ex Mattf.

= Lagenophora =

Genus of flowering plants

Lagenophora is a genus of flowering plants in the family Asteraceae. Species occur in Southeast Asia, Australia, New Zealand, as well as Central and South America.

== Species ==
The following species are recognised in the genus Lagenophora:

- Lagenophora adenosa Jian Wang ter & A.R.Bean - Australia
- Lagenophora barkeri Kirk - New Zealand
- Lagenophora brachyglossa Jian Wang ter & A.R.Bean - Australia
- Lagenophora cuneata Petrie - New Zealand
- Lagenophora fimbriata Jian Wang ter & A.R.Bean - Australia
- Lagenophora gracilis Steetz - Australia
- Lagenophora gunniana Steetz - Australia
- Lagenophora hariotii (Franch.) Franch. - Argentina, Chile incl. Juan Fernández Islands
- Lagenophora hirsuta (Poeppig ex Less.) Dudley - Argentina, Chile
- Lagenophora huegelii Benth. - Australia
- Lagenophora latifolia Hook.f. - Australia
- Lagenophora mikadoi (Koidz.) Koidz. ex H.Koyama - Japan
- Lagenophora montana Hook.f. - Australia, New Zealand
- Lagenophora nudicaulis (Comm. ex Lam.) Dusén - Argentina, Chile
- Lagenophora petiolata Hook.f. - New Zealand
- Lagenophora pinnatifida Hook.f. - New Zealand
- Lagenophora platysperma Jian Wang ter & A.R.Bean - Australia
- Lagenophora pumila (G.Forst.) Cheeseman - New Zealand
- Lagenophora queenslandica Jian Wang ter & A.R.Bean - Australia
- Lagenophora schmidiae de Lange & Jian Wang ter - New Zealand
- Lagenophora sinuosa Lannuzel, Gâteblé & Jian Wang ter - New Caledonia
- Lagenophora sporadica Jian Wang ter & A.R.Bean - Papua New Guinea
- Lagenophora stipitata (Labill.) Druce - blue bottle-daisy, common lagenophora - Australia, New Zealand, Southeast Asia, China, Indian Subcontinent
- Lagenophora strangulata Colenso - New Zealand
- Lagenophora sublyrata (Cass.) A.R.Bean & Jian Wang ter - Australia, New Zealand, Southeast Asia, China, Japan, Indian Subcontinent

== Destruction of specimens ==
In 2017, Australian customs officials destroyed 106 herbarium specimens of Lagenophora that Australian scientists were attempting to re-import into the country, but the specimens' documentation was insufficient. The specimens dated to as early as the 1790s, and included six type specimens. As a result of this incident, many worldwide institutions put a temporary ban on sending museum specimens to Australia.
