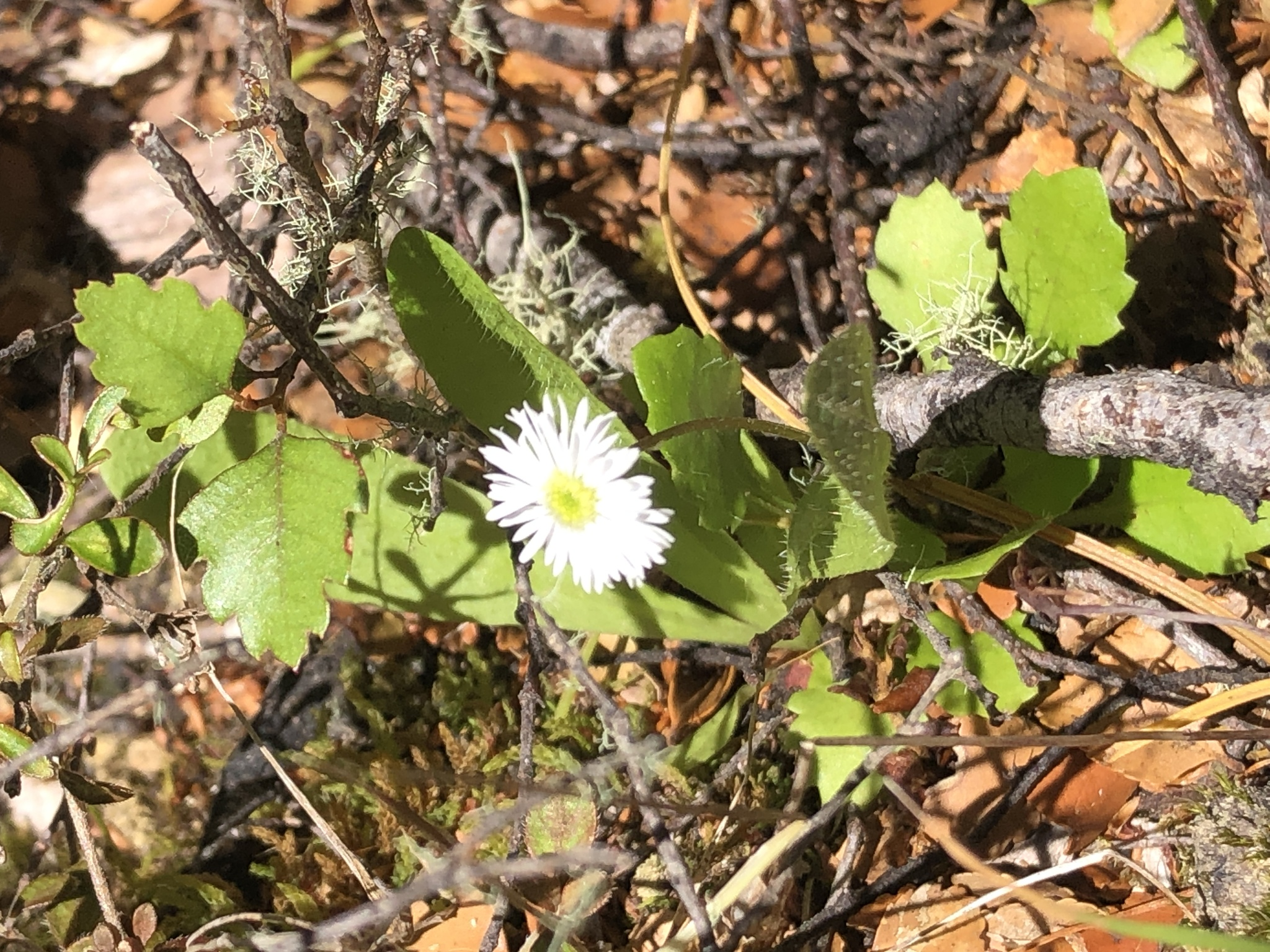
- Lagenophora pumila in Nelson Lakes National Park

Conservation status
- Not Threatened (NZ TCS)

Scientific classification
- Kingdom: Plantae
- Clade: Tracheophytes
- Clade: Angiosperms
- Clade: Eudicots
- Clade: Asterids
- Order: Asterales
- Family: Asteraceae
- Genus: Lagenophora
- Species: L. pumila

Binomial name
- Lagenophora pumila (G.Forst.) Cheeseman

= Lagenophora pumila =

Species of flowering plant

Lagenophora pumila, or papataniwhaniwha, is a species of small flower, endemic to New Zealand.

== Description ==
A small white and yellow flower.

== Range ==
Across New Zealand, including on some outlying islands like Kapiti Island, and more distant chains like the New Zealand Subantarctic Islands. It is also known from Kao (island) in Tonga, from a single specimen.

== Habitat ==
Lowland to montane grasslands.

== Ecology ==
Lagenophora pumila is a good indicator of wetlands.

Puccinia lagenophoricola, a rust fungus, grows exclusively on Lagenophora pumila.

== Etymology ==
Pumila means 'small' in Latin.
