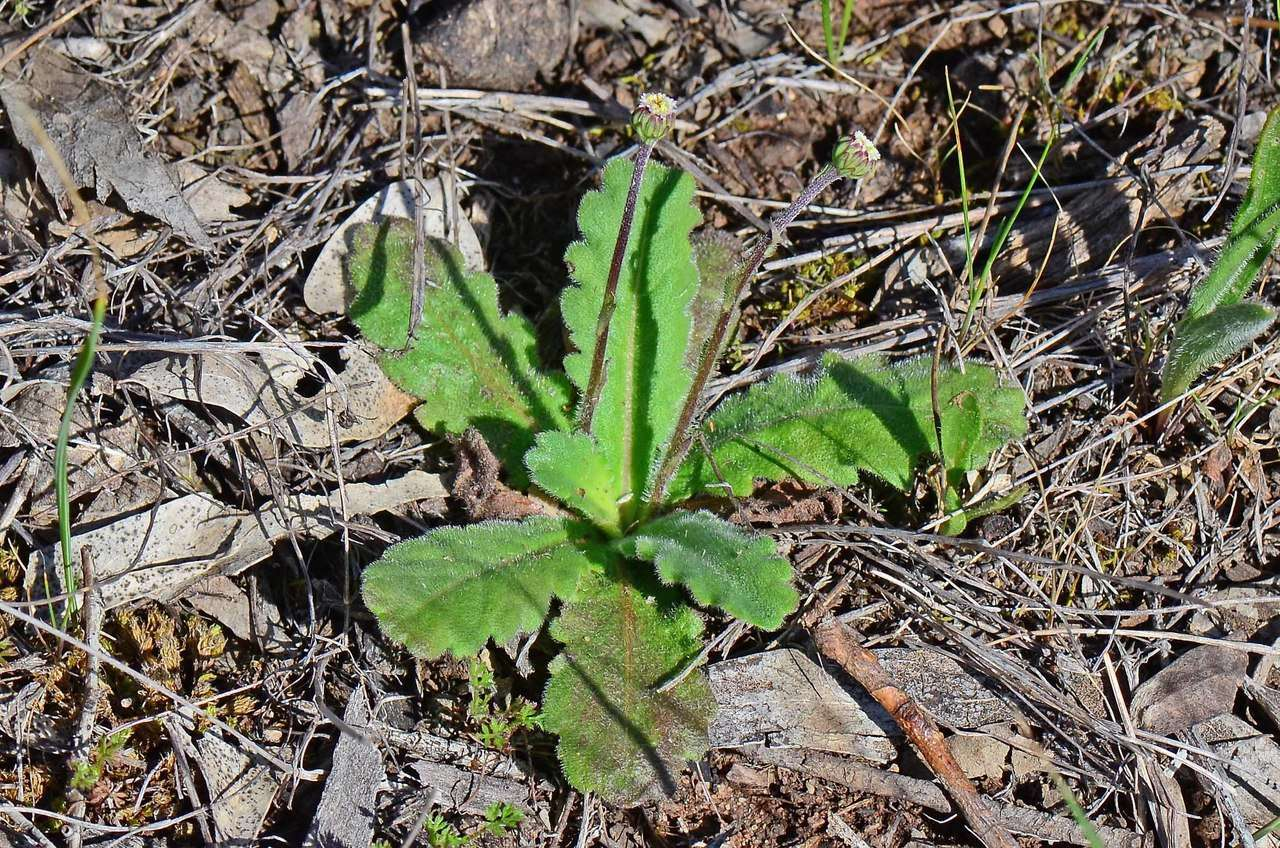
- In Victoria, Australia

Scientific classification
- Kingdom: Plantae
- Clade: Tracheophytes
- Clade: Angiosperms
- Clade: Eudicots
- Clade: Asterids
- Order: Asterales
- Family: Asteraceae
- Genus: Lagenophora
- Species: L. gunniana

Binomial name
- Lagenophora gunniana Steetz

Synonyms
- Lagenophora huegelii Benth (in part)

= Lagenophora gunniana =

Species of plant

Lagenophora gunniana, the coarse bottle-daisy, is a small flowering plant belonging to the family Asteraceae native to the southeastern Australia mainland and Tasmania. The species was first formally named by Joachim Steetz in 1845.

In Victoria, it grows on plains and low hills.
