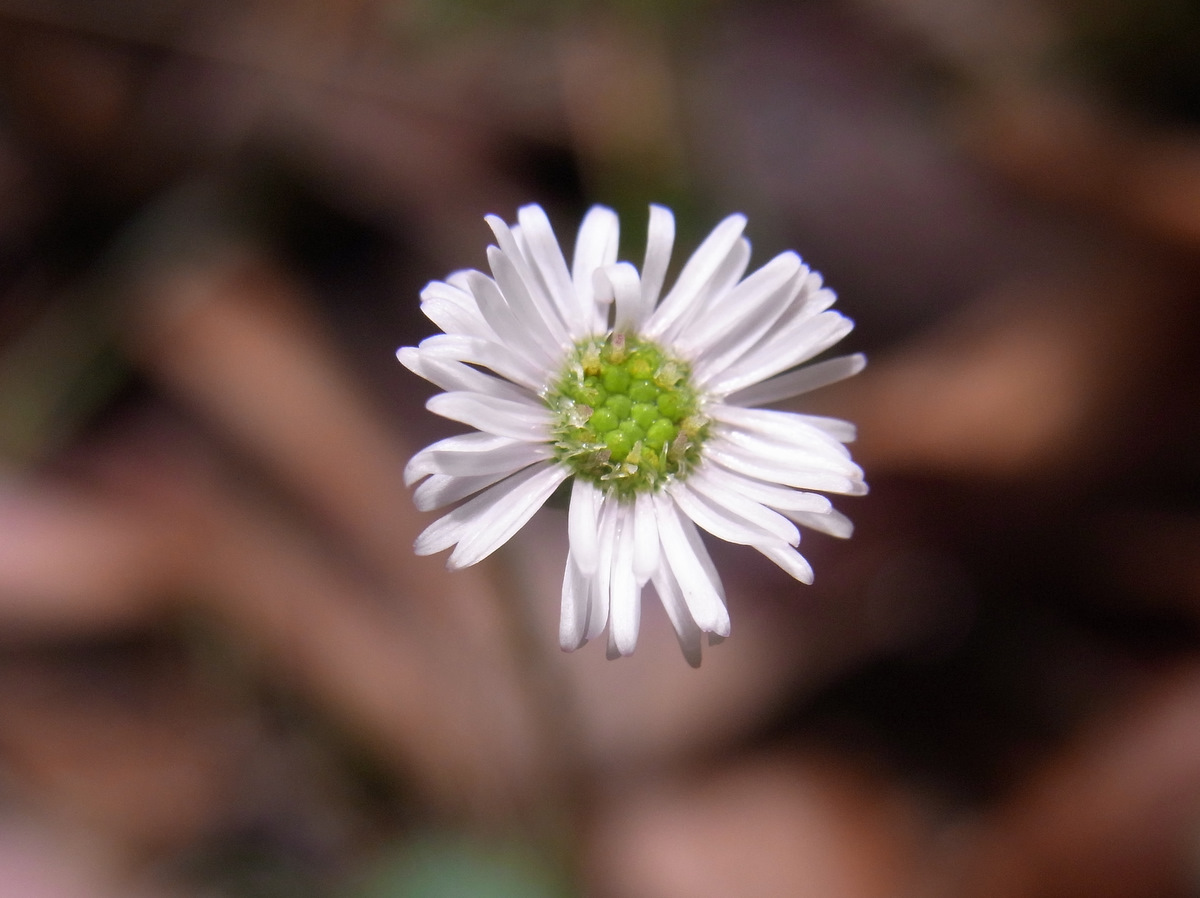
- Sheldon Forest, Australia

Scientific classification
- Kingdom: Plantae
- Clade: Tracheophytes
- Clade: Angiosperms
- Clade: Eudicots
- Clade: Asterids
- Order: Asterales
- Family: Asteraceae
- Genus: Lagenophora
- Species: L. gracilis

Binomial name
- Lagenophora gracilis Steetz
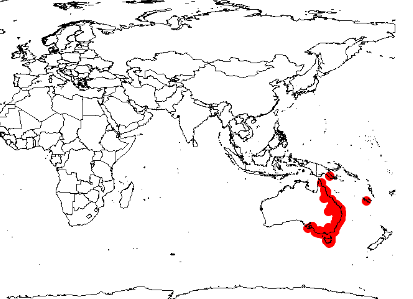
- Occurrence data from AVH

= Lagenophora gracilis =

Species of flowering plant

Lagenophora gracilis is a small plant in the family Asteraceae, found in eastern Australia, and in tropical Asia. Common names include slender bottle-daisy and slender lagenophora. The habitat is the floor of Eucalyptus forests, often in moist situations.
