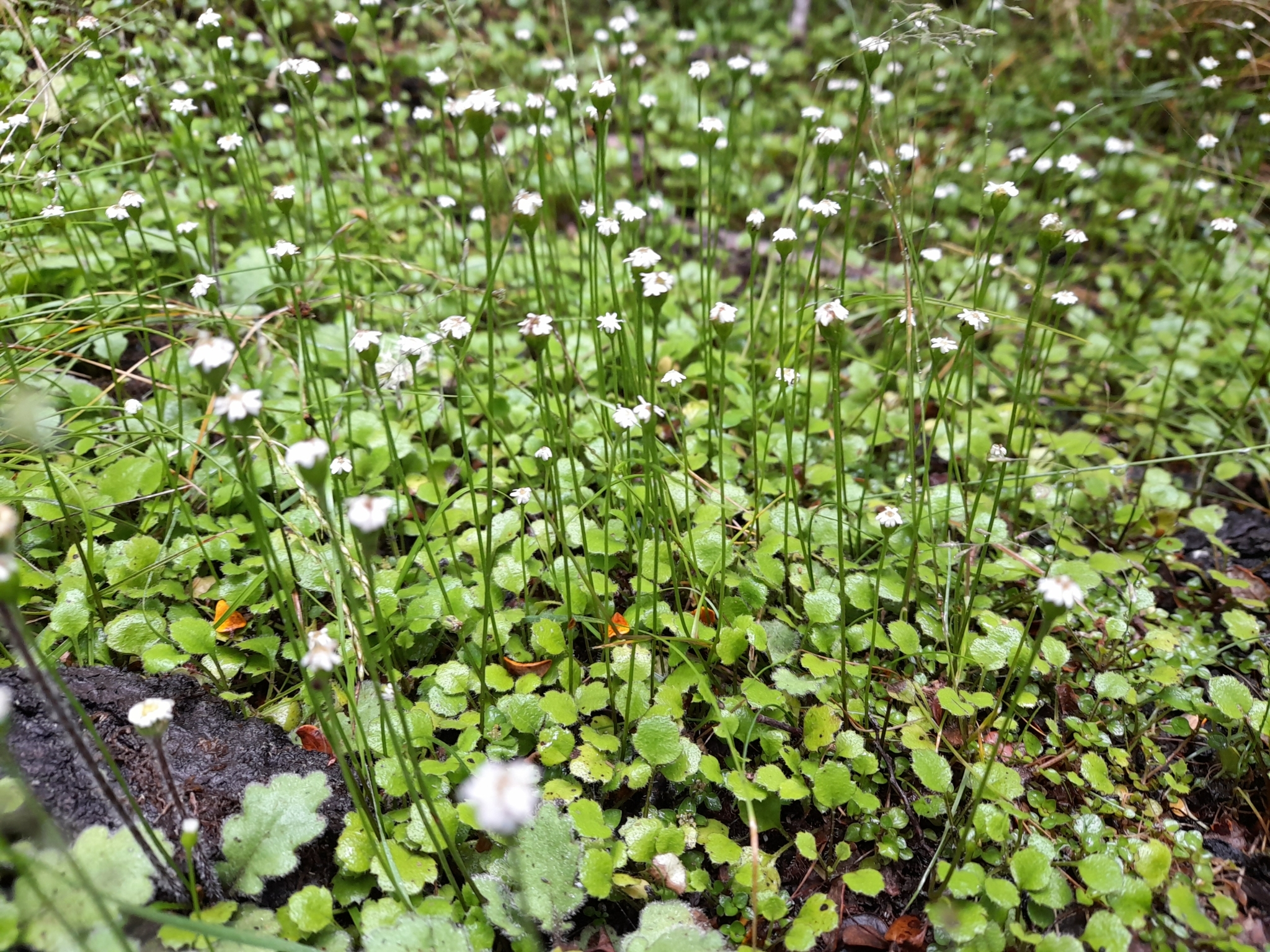
- Lagenophora strangulata in bloom

Conservation status
- Not Threatened (NZ TCS)

Scientific classification
- Kingdom: Plantae
- Clade: Embryophytes
- Clade: Tracheophytes
- Clade: Angiosperms
- Clade: Eudicots
- Clade: Asterids
- Order: Asterales
- Family: Asteraceae
- Genus: Lagenophora
- Species: L. strangulata

Binomial name
- Lagenophora strangulata Colenso, 1890

= Lagenophora strangulata =

Species of flowering plant

Lagenophora strangulata is a species of small flowering plant endemic to New Zealand.

== Description ==
A small green plant with gently toothed leaves, and a long stalk with a small white flower.

== Range ==
New Zealand.
