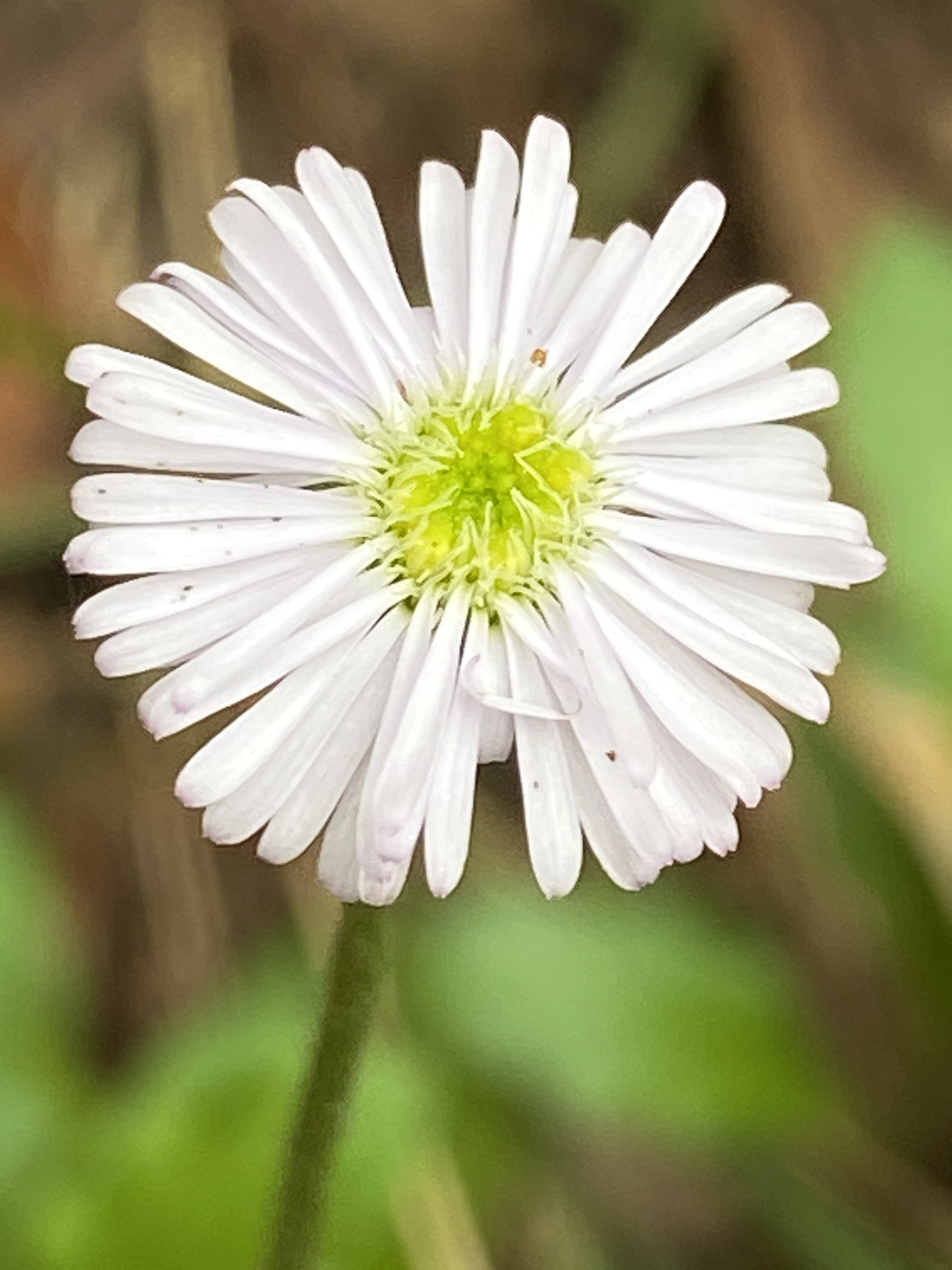

Scientific classification
- Kingdom: Plantae
- Clade: Tracheophytes
- Clade: Angiosperms
- Clade: Eudicots
- Clade: Asterids
- Order: Asterales
- Family: Asteraceae
- Genus: Lagenophora
- Species: L. stipitata

Binomial name
- Lagenophora stipitata (Labill.) Druce
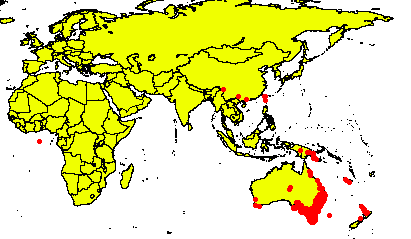
- Occurrence data from GBIF

= Lagenophora stipitata =

Species of plant

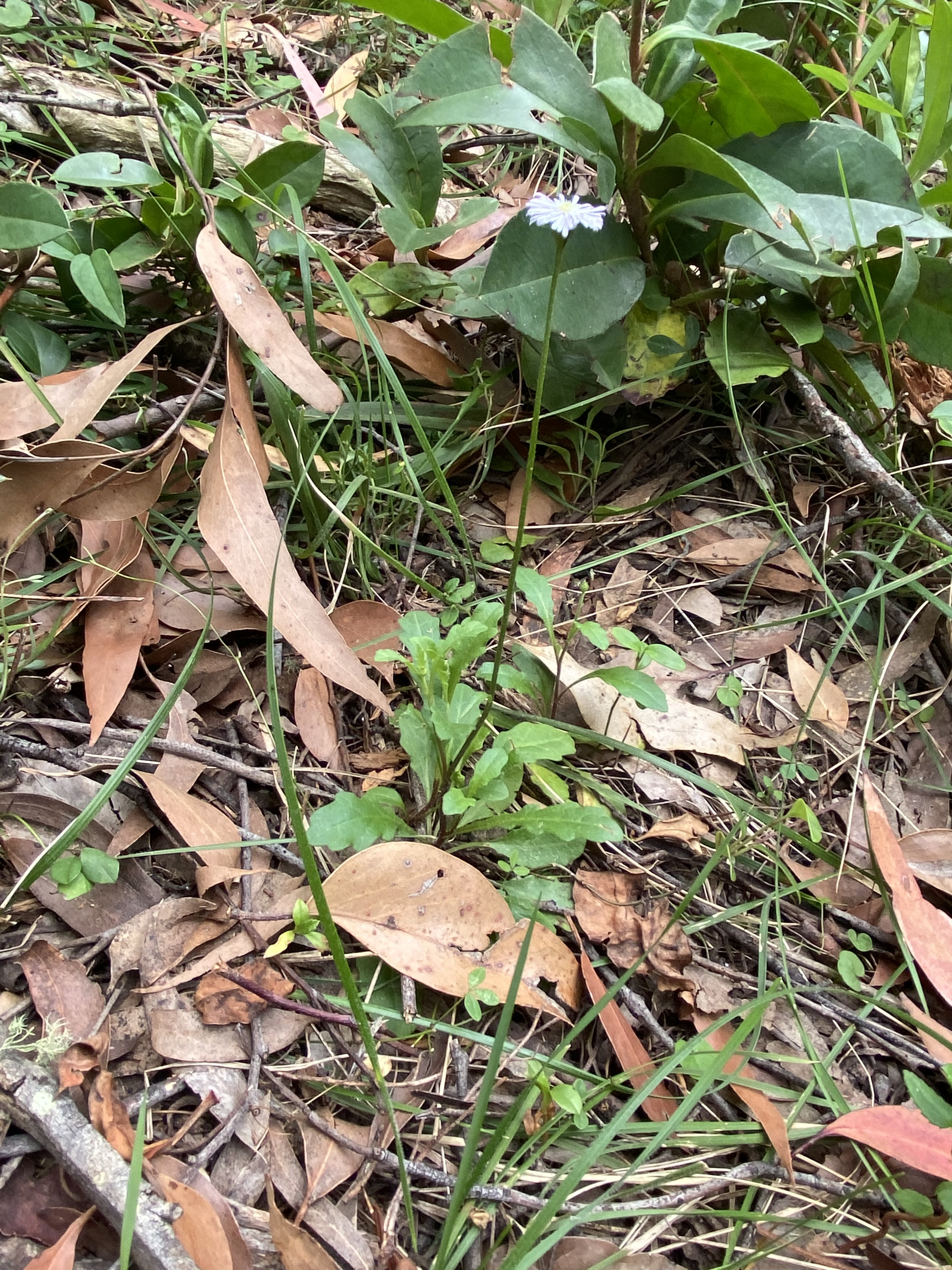
Lagenophora stipitata habit

Lagenophora stipitata, commonly known as blue bottle-daisy or common lagenophora, is a small plant in the family Asteraceae, found in eastern mainland Australia and Tasmania, and also from South East China to East Asia, Java, and New Guinea.

This species is a perennial herb that is stoloniferous and it has fibrous roots.
