= Poihākena =

Poihākena is a Māori language name which can refer to:

- the Māori name for Sydney
- Poihākena Marae in Raglan
