= Waingaro =

Rural community in Waikato, New Zealand

- Hamlet
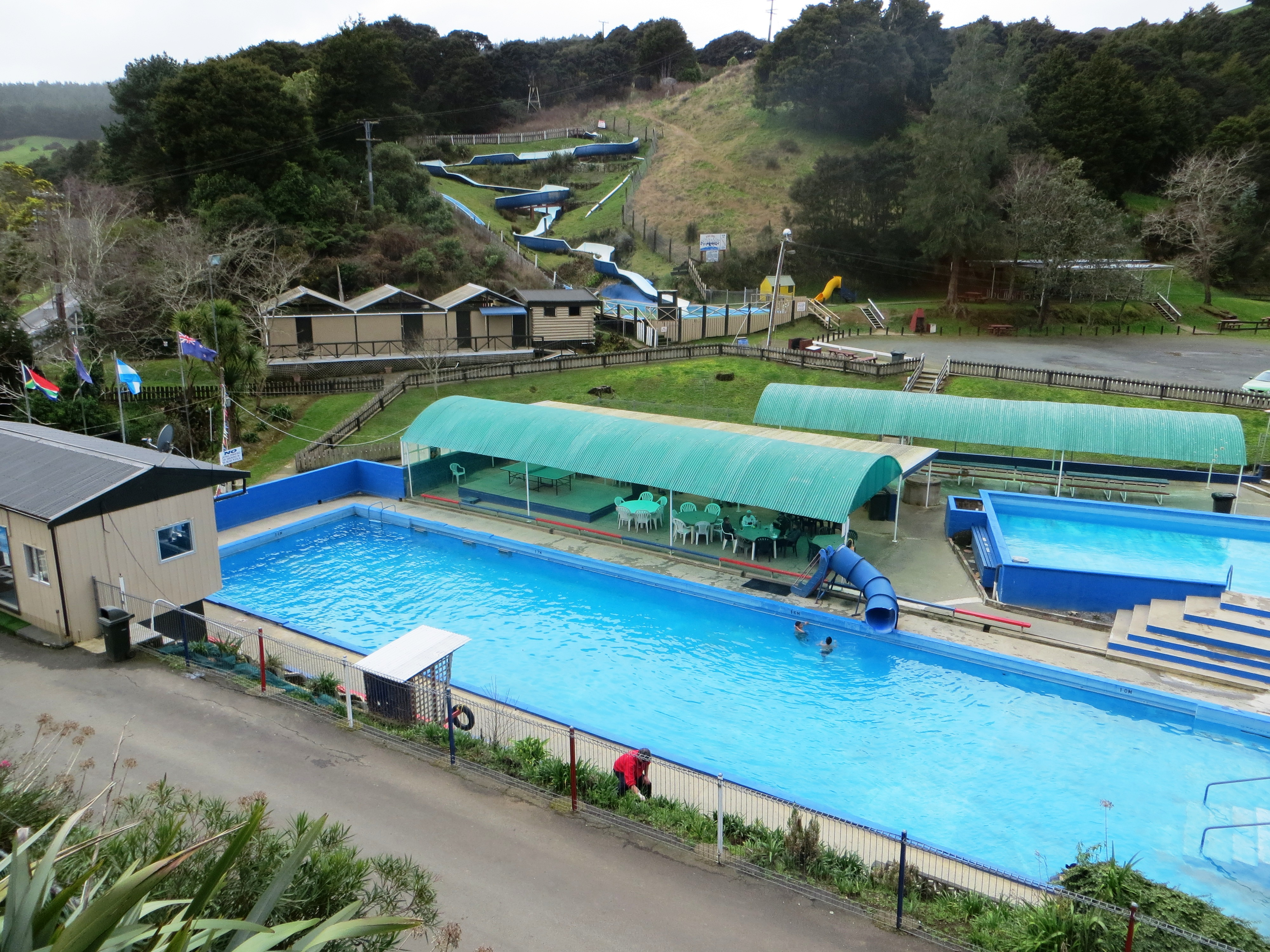
- Waingaro hot pools and hydroslide viewed from hotel
- Interactive map of Waingaro
- Coordinates: 37.68992°S 174.99915°E
- Country: New Zealand
- Region: Waikato
- District: Waikato District
- Wards: Western Districts General Ward; Tai Runga Takiwaa Maaori Ward
- Electorates: Port Waikato; Taranaki-King Country; Hauraki-Waikato (Māori)

Government
  - Territorial Authority: Waikato District Council
  - Regional council: Waikato Regional Council
  - Mayor of Waikato: Aksel Bech
  - Port Waikato MP and Taranaki-King Country MP: Andrew Bayly and Barbara Kuriger
  - Hauraki-Waikato MP: Hana-Rawhiti Maipi-Clarke

Area
  - Territorial: 265.38 km^{2} (102.46 sq mi)
- Elevation: 30 m (98 ft)

Population (2023 Census)
  - Territorial: 564
  - Density: 2.13/km^{2} (5.50/sq mi)
- Time zone: UTC+12 (NZST)
  - Summer (DST): UTC+13 (NZDT)

Waingaro is a rural community in the Waikato District and Waikato region of New Zealand's North Island, on the banks of the Waingaro River, where it is fed by a hot spring.

== Demographics ==
Waingaro covers a total area of 265.38 km^{2} (102.46 sq mi), which overlaps with Glen Massey. It is part of the larger Te Ākau statistical area.

Historical population
Year	Pop.	±% p.a.
2006	510	—
2013	477	−0.95%
2018	531	+2.17%
2023	564	+1.21%
The 2006 population is for a smaller area of 251.18 km^{2}. Source:

Waingaro had a population of 564 in the 2023 New Zealand census, an increase of 33 people (6.2%) since the 2018 census, and an increase of 87 people (18.2%) since the 2013 census. There were 309 males and 252 females in 201 dwellings. 0.5% of people identified as LGBTQ+. There were 105 people (18.6%) aged under 15 years, 90 (16.0%) aged 15 to 29, 273 (48.4%) aged 30 to 64, and 93 (16.5%) aged 65 or older.

People could identify as more than one ethnicity. The results were 78.2% European (Pākehā), 33.5% Māori, 5.3% Pasifika, 1.6% Asian, and 1.1% other, which includes people giving their ethnicity as "New Zealander". English was spoken by 96.8%, Māori language by 8.5%, Samoan by 0.5%, and other languages by 4.3%. No language could be spoken by 2.1% (e.g. too young to talk). New Zealand Sign Language was known by 1.1%. The percentage of people born overseas was 12.8, compared with 28.8% nationally.

Religious affiliations were 22.3% Christian, 4.3% Māori religious beliefs, 1.6% New Age, and 0.5% other religions. People who answered that they had no religion were 62.8%, and 7.4% of people did not answer the census question.

Of those at least 15 years old, 84 (18.3%) people had a bachelor's or higher degree, 252 (54.9%) had a post-high school certificate or diploma, and 123 (26.8%) people exclusively held high school qualifications. 42 people (9.2%) earned over $100,000 compared to 12.1% nationally. The employment status of those at least 15 was that 222 (48.4%) people were employed full-time, 66 (14.4%) were part-time, and 15 (3.3%) were unemployed.

== Marae ==
Waingaro Paa (Marae) is the meeting place of the local Waikato Tainui hapū of Ngaati Tamainupoo, Ngaati Te Huaki and Ngaati Toa Kotara. It includes Ngaa Tokotoru the meeting house. The naming of the wharenui reflects the three Haapu and the Tuupuna that bear their names.

In October 2020, the Government committed $2,584,751 from the Provincial Growth Fund to upgrade the marae and 7 other Waikato Tainui marae, creating 40 jobs.

== Education ==
Waingaro School is a co-educational state primary school, with a roll of 8 as of July 2026. The school opened in 1892.

== Waingaro Hot Spring ==
Waingaro Hot Spring was closed in 2014, until improvements were made and it reopened in 2016. It has dilute alkaline NaCl-type (salty), 37 to 54 °C (99 to 129 °F), thermal water flowing from early Jurassic basement rocks at about 350 litres (92 US gal) per minute, probably originating at least 3 kilometres (2 mi) deep and sharing a source with Naike and Waikorea, as they all have similar chemical composition.

In 1921 this description was given:

Waingaro/ on the coach-road from Ngaruawhahia to the west coast, has waters of the most strictly simple 'thermal' type, containing only 22 grains of solids to the gallon. It is not a 'spa,' though it is used locally and had at one time a great reputation among the Maoris. The outflow of water is very large and the temperature is high. There is a large simple immersion bath, with hotel accommodation alongside.

ANALYSIS Grains per gallon.

Sodium chloride 6-43
Silica 7-80
Total solids 22-66
Temperature. 130 °F.

In 1942 a corrugated iron shelter, which had covered the spring on the north side of the road, was swept away by a flood. After that the hot water was piped under the road and the present complex of baths built.

Spring	Date sampled	T_{D}°C	pH(20 °C)	Li	Na	K	Ca	Sr	Ba	B	HCO_{3}	SiO_{2}	SO_{4}	F	Cl	I	ΔD ‰	δ^{18}O ‰	T (SiO_{2}) °C
Waingaro well	12/05/2005	54.7	9.2	0.05	79	0.73	1.2	0.005	0.0004	4.9	44	55	8.3	3.5	49	0.029	-31.5	-5.74	83

== Waingaro Landing ==
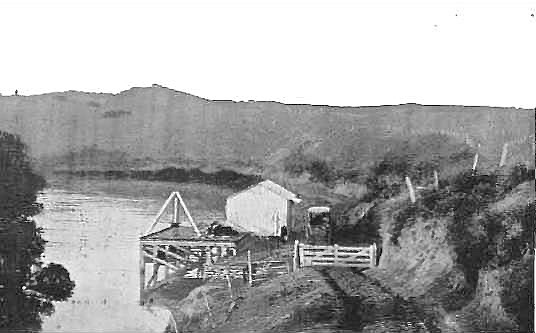
Mail coach at Waingaro Landing

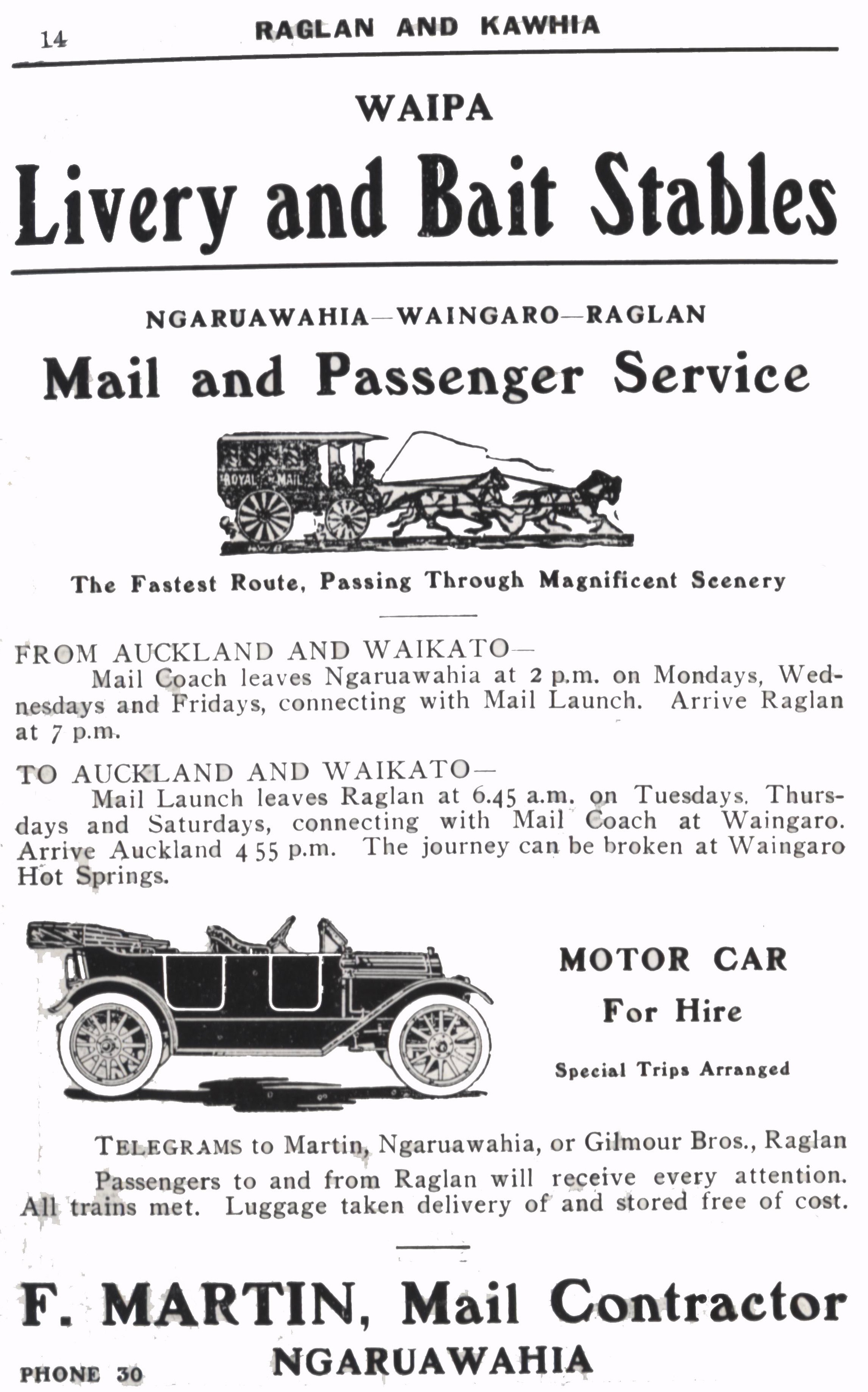
advert from 1915 guidebook

The narrow, 2 km (1.2 mi) gravel road from Ohautira Rd to the boat ramp and whitebait stands at Waingaro Landing now sees little traffic, but was once much more important.

Just south of the point where the Waingaro joins the Kerikeri River, there is a record of Waingaro Landing being used by Rev A N Brown in 1834 to travel from Bay of Islands to Kawhia. Little changed for another half century.

About 1883 a Crown Grant of 1,000 acres (400 ha) on the banks of the Waingaro stream was taken on by M. Barton or Patene, then Mr Clarke, then by Sam Picken. Most of it was in heavy bush. Clarke had started clearing it, employing Arthur Moon and Johnnie Douglas. Picken travelled to Huntly by train, crossing the Waikato by boat, then rode on a bridle track to Glen Afton and finally on a native track through heavy bush of rimu and mataī on the hills, and kahikatea on the flats. Within a year the native track had been turned into a bridle track. Picken was joined by George Richards, Arthur Shilson, Ned Edmonds, Stevens, Arthur Richards and Pyne. The Crown then built a road from Ngāruawāhia to the landing. By 1893 most land had been bought, except 600 acres (240 ha) at the Hot Springs on a 21-year lease to Sam Wilson, who built the hotel.

Charles Sutton bought the 30 ft (9.1 m) steam launch 'Vesta', which could tow a punt from Raglan to Waingaro in one hour. An experiment with the 40 ft (12 m) 'Amateur' was unsuccessful; it took 3 hours. In 1896 the 'Vesta' was repaired and took on the work again.

For almost two decades the landing became a popular route to Raglan, when Captain Coge ran the S.S. 'Maori' between Raglan and the landing from 1903. A coach from Ngāruawāhia brought mail and passengers.

About 1903, the Ministry of Tourist and Health Resorts published these options for journeys from Auckland to Raglan:

- Auckland to Ngāruawāhia, 74 mi (119 km): Depart rail Auckland 10 a.m.
- Arrive Ngāruawāhia, 12.58 p.m. 1st class 8/10, 2nd 5/9.
- Ngāruawāhia to Waingaro, 16 mi (26 km). Coach departs Tuesday and Friday, 1.15 p.m. arrives 4 p.m. 6/- single, 10/- return.
- Waingaro to Raglan, 9 mi (14 km). Oil launch Tuesday and Friday. 2/6 single, 4/- return.
  - Raglan to Onehunga 115 mi (185 km). N.S.S. (Northern Steamship) Steamer weekly. 20/- single, 30/- return. Saloon.
  - Onehunga to Auckland, 8 mi (13 km). Rail frequently. First I/-, 2nd 9 pence.
    - Raglan to Hamilton, 35 mi (56 km). Coach M.W. and Fridays. Departs 7 a.m. Arrives 1.10 p.m.
    - Hamilton to Raglan. Coach Tues., Thurs., and Saturdays. Depart Hamilton 9 a.m. Arrives 4 p.m. Single 12/-, return 20/-.

Coge soon gave up the boat service, but by 18 November 1904 the Raglan Chronicle was advertising for cargo for the launch 'Nita' after 7 local men formed the co-operative, Raglan Launch Co, to take over, with land agent, A. R. Langley, as secretary. With Mr B. Vercoe in charge, she continued trading until a fire in March, 1909, with Frank Charlton in charge. However, the fire seems to have been extinguished and the 'Nita' was later bought by Billy McQueen, who traded round the harbour till about 1920. From time to time the Post Office invited tenders to carry mail on the route. The County Council agreed to extend the shed and wharf in 1910, though not buy extra land for it. The work was completed in 1913.

The road to the landing was still being improved in 1905, when £100 was allocated.

After 1920 the mail coach was replaced by a cream truck run by Bob Gibb on a Ngāruawāhia-Te Ākau mail run.
