= Kerikeri River (Waikato) =

Coordinates: 37°43′S 174°56′E

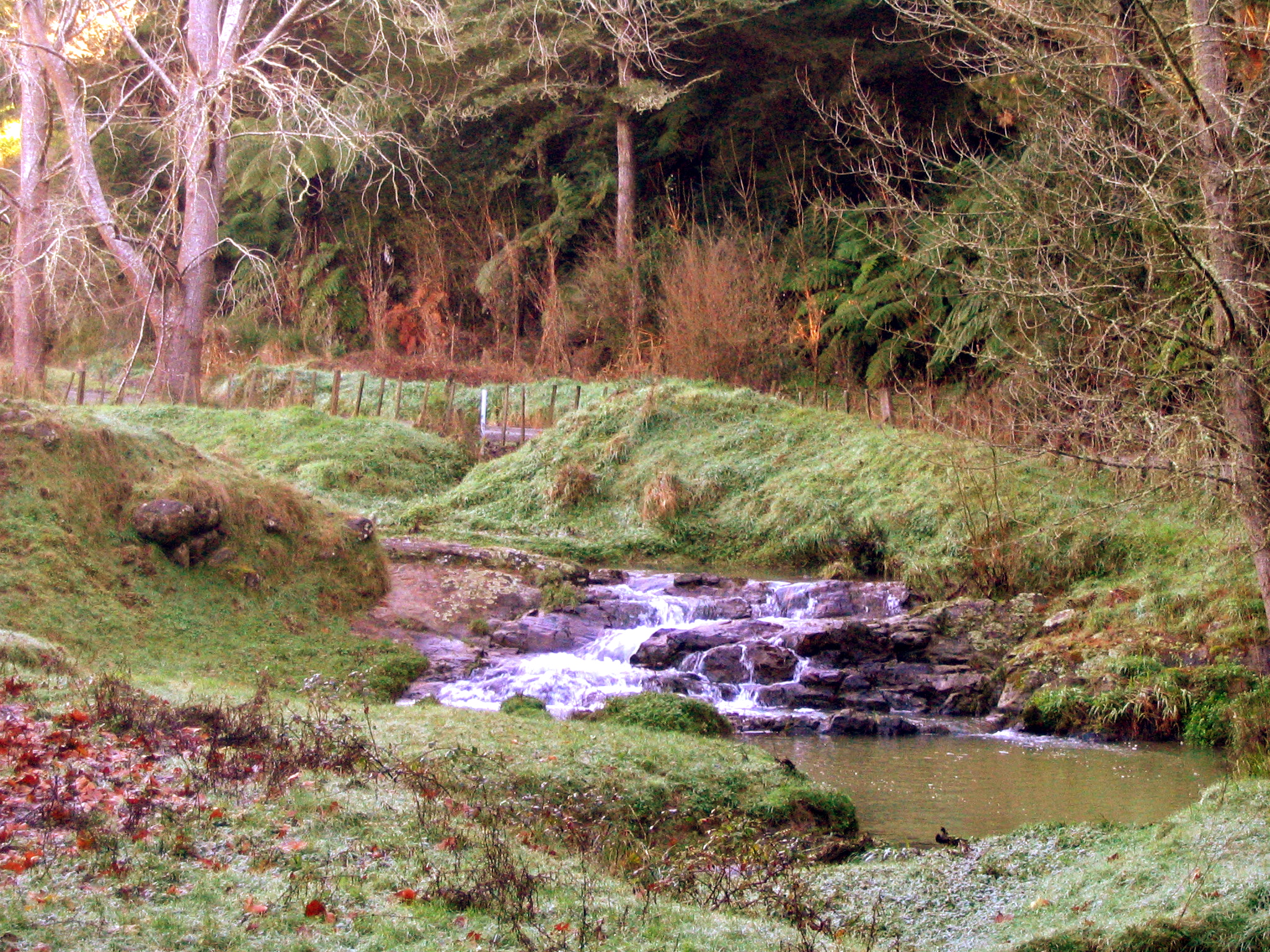
- Rapids beside Ruakiwi Rd

Location
- Country: New Zealand

Physical characteristics
- Source
  - elevation: 170 metres (560 ft)
- Mouth
  - location: Raglan Harbour
  - elevation: 0 m (0 ft)
- Length: 9 km (5.6 mi)

The Kerikeri River is a short river of the Waikato region of New Zealand's North Island, which flows into the northern shore of Raglan Harbour.

The valley is largely along the line of the fault on the eastern edge of Whaingaroa Harbour. It flows over Coleman Conglomerate and, at its lower end, blue-grey Puti Siltstone, both of Puaroan age (about 150 million years ago).

From about 1870 Sam and Tom Wilson ran a flax mill powered by a wheel in the river. Much of the native bush was cleared for farming between 1910 and 1920.

== See also ==
- List of rivers of New Zealand
