= Lake Waitamoumou =

Lake in the North Island of New Zealand

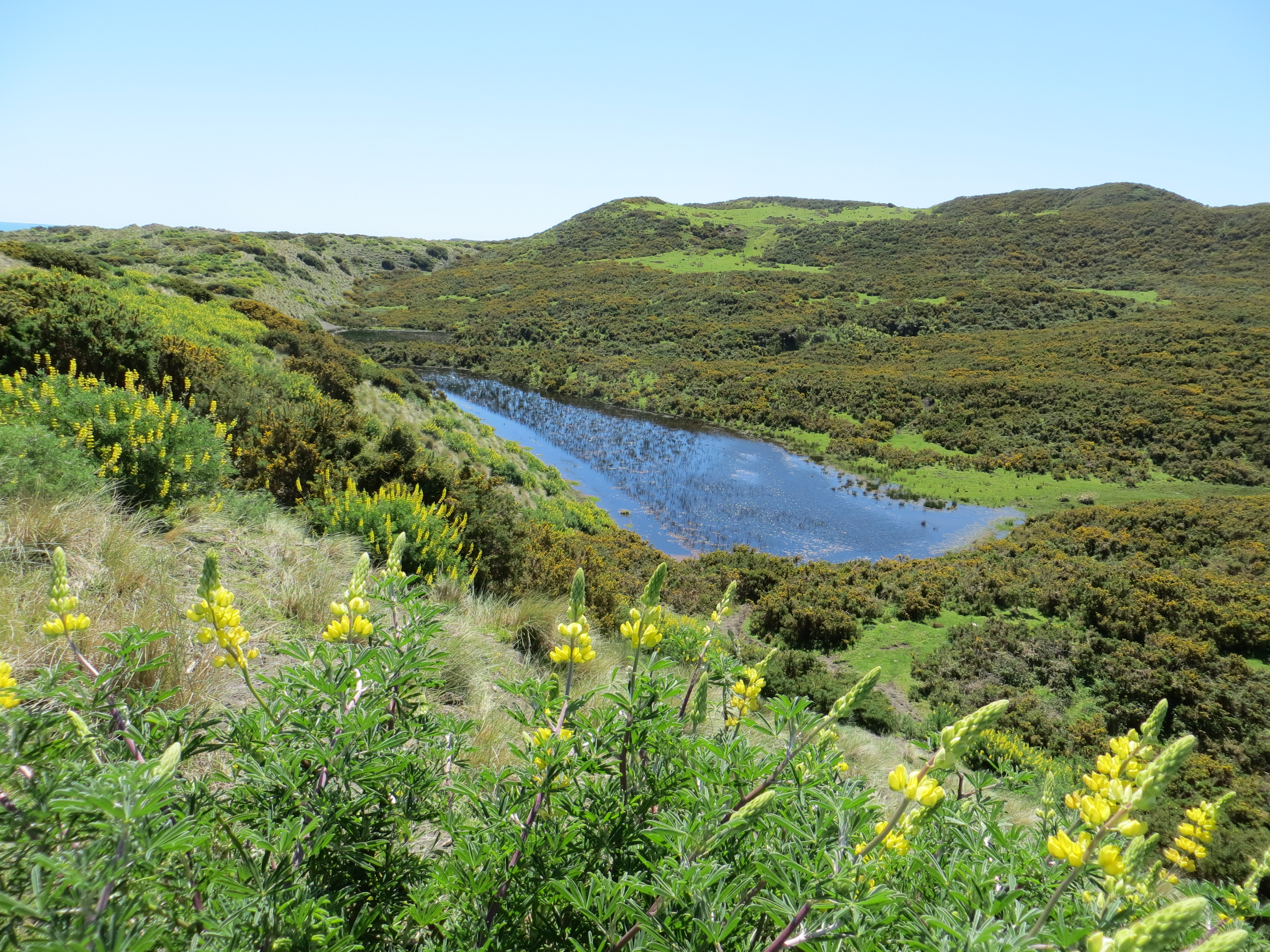
- Lake Waitamoumou (October 2012)

- Lake Waitamoumou is in the Waikato region of the North Island.
- Location: Waikato District, Waikato region, North Island
- Coordinates: 37°47′21″S 174°50′34″E
- Type: Endorheic lake
- Primary inflows: stream from Horea
- Primary outflows: seepage
- Catchment area: 1 km^{2} (0.39 sq mi)
- Basin countries: New Zealand
- Surface area: 2.38 ha (5.9 acres)
- Surface elevation: 24 m (79 ft)

Lake Waitamoumou is a small dune-dammed lake a kilometre north of Raglan in the Waikato region of New Zealand.

== Geology ==
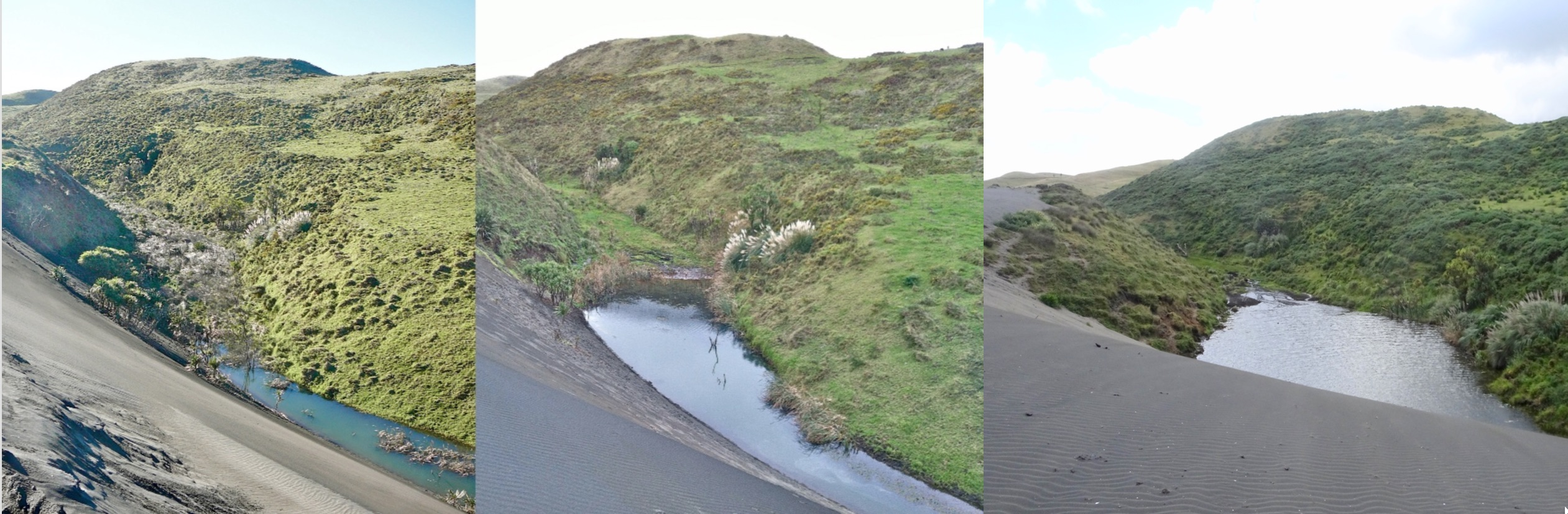
That the dunes have formed in just 800 years is credible when comparing these photos of a newly dune-dammed lake about 600m north of Waitamoumou. Left June 2007. Centre May 2012. Right Dec. 2017. The pampas on the right bank is in the same place in all photos, but the lake has grown as the sand has further blocked its valley and extra sand has covered some of the cabbage trees.

Brown clay underlies the dunes, which limits the rate of seepage through the dunes, thus forming lakes where dune advance has blocked valleys. The lake bed and stream are on Awhitu sands. They are about a million years old and made up of pumiceous cross bedded brown and yellow clayey sands. The lake is dammed by dunes of Nukumiti Sands which have formed in the last 800 years.

== Biota ==
It seems no detailed survey has been done of the lake. As cattle often walk in the lake, it is likely to be polluted. In the 1970s the dunes between the lake and the harbour were sown with tree lupin (Lupinus arboreus) and Marram Grass, which has reduced sand movement and provided a low quality pasture. Frogs can be heard croaking in the lake. The pompilid wasp (Cryptocheilus australis) and its prey, the nursery web spider (Dolomedes minor), have been seen near the lake.

== History ==
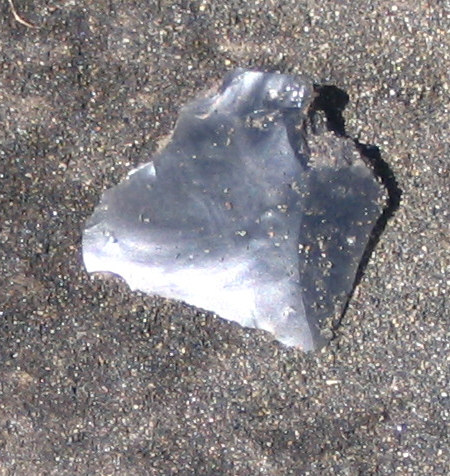
A flake of tūhua (obsidian), used for sharp tools, near the lake

Remains of stone tools and other artefacts show that this area was heavily populated in pre-Colonial times. Raglan Museum has a collection of these Ngāti Taahinga artefacts, with an exhibition of some 2,000 items opened in 2015. Some of the stones are thought to have come from D'Urville Island, Mayor Island / Tuhua and Whakaari/White Island, confirming significant trading in pre-colonial times. The archaeology map records some 30 sites nearby.

The county history says, "On the 25th of May 1850, the chief of the Ngāti Mahuta hapu concerned, ceded to the Crown, the land known as Te Horea. . . In 1874 the whole of Te Ākau, with the exception of certain native reserves, was leased to John Studholme, of Canterbury, for a term of 30 years. Soon the smoke from extensive fires marked further Pakeha inroads into the native forests of the island." His 90,000 acre lease lasted until the early 1890s, when the New Zealand Loan and Mercantile Agency Company took it on. It was known as Darrow's Station when he was manager, but the Liberal land reforms resulted in the break up of Te Akau Station in 1911, after which much more of the native forest was felled and burnt.

== See also ==
- List of lakes of New Zealand
