= Joan Fear =

New Zealand artist (1932–2022)

Joan Fear MNZM
- Born: Joan Elizabeth Gibbison; 2 April 1932; Raglan, New Zealand
- Died: 11 October 2022 (aged 90)
- Occupations: Painter; teacher
- Spouse: Laurie Fear (m. 1955, separated)
- Children: 2

Joan Elizabeth Fear MNZM (née Gibbison; 2 April 1932 – 11 October 2022) was a New Zealand artist and teacher, known for her paintings of Waikato landscapes and portraits. She began exhibiting her work in the 1960s after joining the Waikato Society of Arts (later becoming a life member and patron of the society). In the 1980s she was able to leave her job working as a schoolteacher and become a full-time artist. She continued to paint into her later years; an exhibition was hosted in 2012 by the Waikato Museum to mark her 80th birthday.

== Early life and family ==
Fear was born on 2 April 1932 in Raglan, and raised on a farm in nearby Kauroa. She was the sixth of nine children of Jessie Gibbison (née Carr) and Frank Gibbison. Her mother had worked as a governess and her father had fought at Gallipoli in World War I before returning home to run the family farm. Fear attended Kauroa School and Raglan District High School.

Fear's artistic talents were recognised in her childhood, but her mother forbade her from attending art school due to concerns about immorality. She instead took art courses by correspondence while at high school and also learned from her older sister Dorothy, who had studied art as part of her teaching course. As a young woman, Fear lived and worked on the family farm and used a portion of the farmhouse verandah as her artist's studio.

After working in a bookstore for a period, she spent time working in the South Island, where she met her husband Laurie Fear at night art classes. They were married in 1955 and moved to Hamilton. They had two children, and would later separate in the 1990s when Fear was in her 60s.

== Artistic career ==
After moving to Hamilton, Fear continued to take night classes, joined an artist's collective called the Studio Group based at the studio of Ray Starr and rented a studio space. In 1960, she joined the Waikato Society of Arts, and her paintings were featured in a 1962 exhibition. She was a well-known female artist in Waikato during the late 20th century, together with Ruth Davey and Judy Pickard. In 1964 she donated paintings to the University of Waikato which had not previously had an art collection. Her first solo exhibition was in 1965 at the Hamilton City Art Gallery and featured paintings of landscapes near Raglan such as Whale Bay. A review in the Waikato Times called her an "industrious little painter". In the same year she was the recipient of the Booth & Chapman Art Award for a watercolour called Top of the Morning featuring two children riding ponies.

Fear continued to participate in exhibitions during the late 1960s and 1970s, and held further solo exhibitions in 1971, 1974 to 1976 and 1978. In 1966 she began teaching art at Waikato Diocesan School for Girls and Hamilton Boys' High School. She also judged art competitions, selected work for exhibitions, and attended and organised local arts festivals. In 1972 she founded the Waikato Society of Arts (WSA) Arts School, which continues to operate as of 2022. In the late 1970s she and her husband renovated their house to create a studio area.

In the 1980s she was able to become a full-time artist. Her notable work in this decade included a large painting for the new Hamilton City Council building, a wall hanging for the Waikato Embroiderers' Guild, and a painting that was presented as an official gift by the city of Hamilton to the city of Urawa in Japan. Ross Jansen, then the mayor of Hamilton, described Fear as "a foremost painter". In 1984 her oil painting Entrance received the Gallagher Group National Art Award.

In Awfully Good Taste was a 1997 solo exhibition, her first in 10 years, featuring still-life paintings of food. In an article about the exhibition, the Waikato Times described her as "one of the Waikato's leading artists". In 1999 she collaborated with other Waikato artists on an exhibition about time and mortality at the ArtsPost gallery.

== Later life and death ==
Fear's later solo exhibitions included Acclimatised in 2002, Four Decades of Painting by an Otago Regionalist in 2004 hosted by the University of Waikato and Indigenous in 2008, which featured paintings of New Zealand native flora and fauna. Her style has been described as expressionist or impressionist, and her preferred medium was oil, although she also painted in watercolour and gouache. A review of Acclimatised for the Waikato Times said that "subtlety of colour, delicacy of line and assuredness of technique" are characteristic of Fear's art.

In the 2006 New Year Honours she was appointed a Member of the New Zealand Order of Merit for services to the arts. She was also a patron of the Waikato Society of Arts, and was made a life member in 1996.

In 2012, to mark her 80th birthday, the Waikato Museum held an exhibition of her work, titled Fearless. Leafa Wilson, the museum's curator of art, noted that the work in the exhibition represented only some of her paintings, because Fear's works were "living in collections across the country, in the National Portrait Gallery, in homes, galleries and collection painting racks". Fear attended the exhibition's launch event despite only being released from hospital two days before, having suffered a stroke six weeks previously. At the time, the Waikato Times reported that an oil painting by Fear could sell for as much as NZ$10,000.

Fear died on 11 October 2022. After her death, Wilson said she was the greatest Waikato painter of the 20th century, and that "her ability to mould and shape paint was exemplary and sculptural and beautiful and was deeply informed by not just what she saw but by intuiting and interpreting nature".
