= Strawberry Fields (New Zealand festival) =

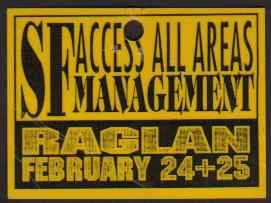
Strawberry Fields AAA (Access All Areas) Pass

The Strawberry Fields music festivals were a series of large outdoor events in New Zealand, featuring music as the central theme. They are considered influential in the timeline of New Zealand rock music festivals.

== Venue ==
The festivals ran in 1993, 1994, and 1995 at farms at Te Uku, 30 km (19 mi) west of Hamilton, near Raglan, and at Queenstown. The festivals were three-day events.

== Associated events ==
Strawberry Fields Management also ran other festivals, such as the Raglan Blues & Roots Festival in April 2001. In 2009 ten local residents cited the local disruption allegedly caused by the Strawberry Fields events in the 1990s, when opposing a series of mini-festivals to be held on the same site.

== External references ==
- Official web site Strawberry Fields Management Ltd
- 1995 festival performance on youtube
