= Raglan, New Zealand =

Raglan Whāingaroa, or Whaaingaroa
- Minor urban area
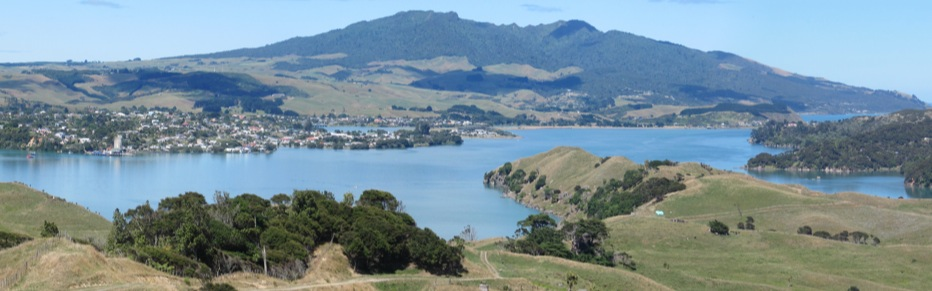
- Mt. Karioi, Raglan and Whāingaroa Harbour
- Interactive map of Raglan
- Coordinates: 37°48′S 174°53′E
- Country: New Zealand
- Region: Waikato
- District: Waikato District
- Wards: Whāingaroa General Ward; Tai Runga Takiwaa Maaori Ward
- Community: Raglan Community
- Electorates: Taranaki-King Country; Hauraki-Waikato (Māori)

Government
  - Territorial Authority: Waikato District Council
  - Regional council: Waikato Regional Council
  - Mayor of Waikato: Aksel Bech
  - Taranaki-King Country MP: Barbara Kuriger
  - Hauraki-Waikato MP: Hana-Rawhiti Maipi-Clarke

Area
  - Total: 7.22 km^{2} (2.79 sq mi)

Population (June 2025)
  - Total: 3,910
  - Density: 542/km^{2} (1,400/sq mi)
- Postcode(s): 3225

Raglan (Māori: Whāingaroa or Rakarana) is a small beachside town located 48 km (30 mi) west of Hamilton, New Zealand on State Highway 23. It is known for its surfing, and volcanic black sand beaches.

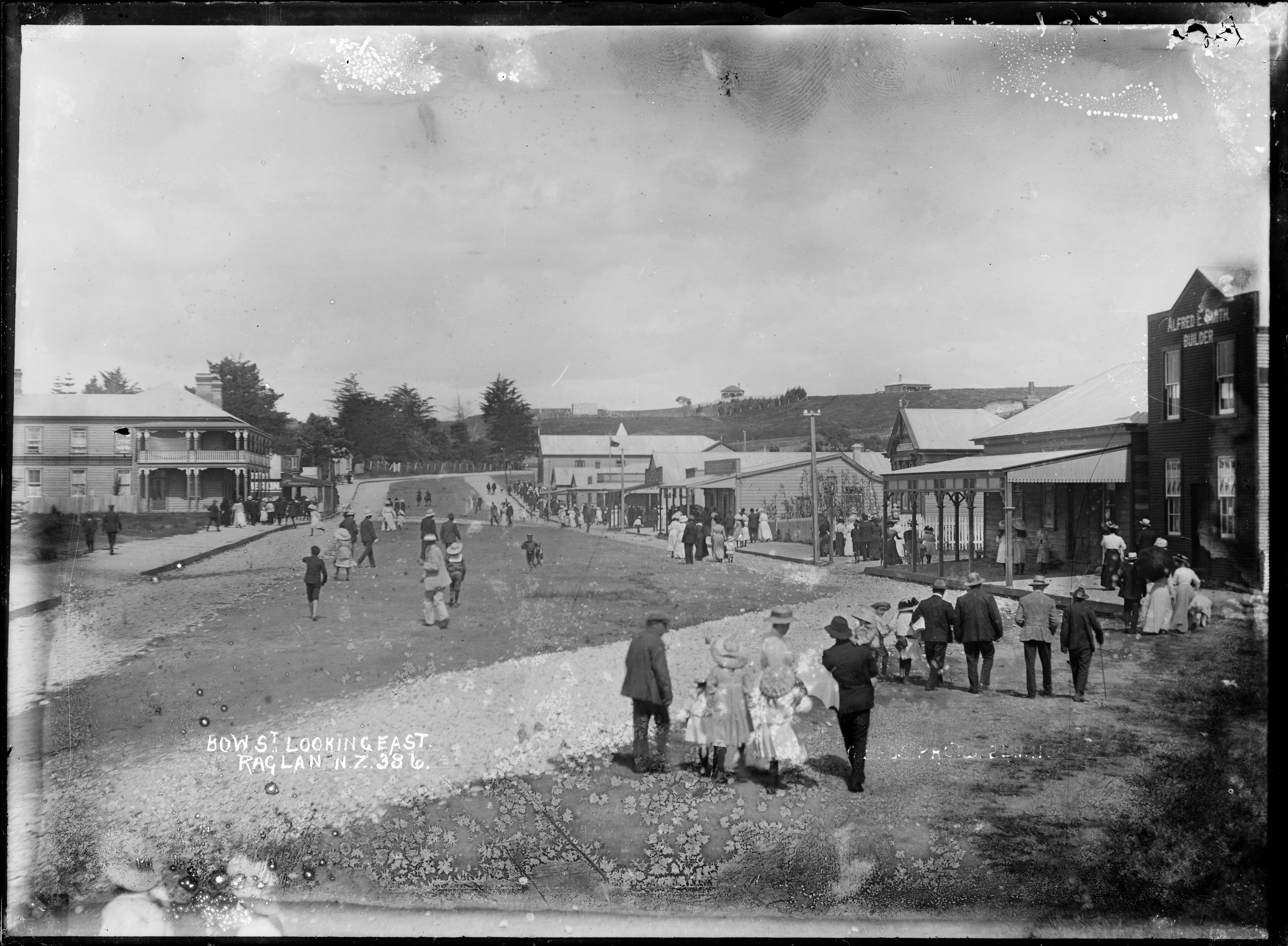
Bow St in 1911 – of these buildings, only those on the far left (Harbour View Hotel) and right (skate shop and ULO) remain, plus the building in the middle distance on the right (Shack). The street retains a grassy centre, but, since October 1924, roads have occupied most of it.

== History ==
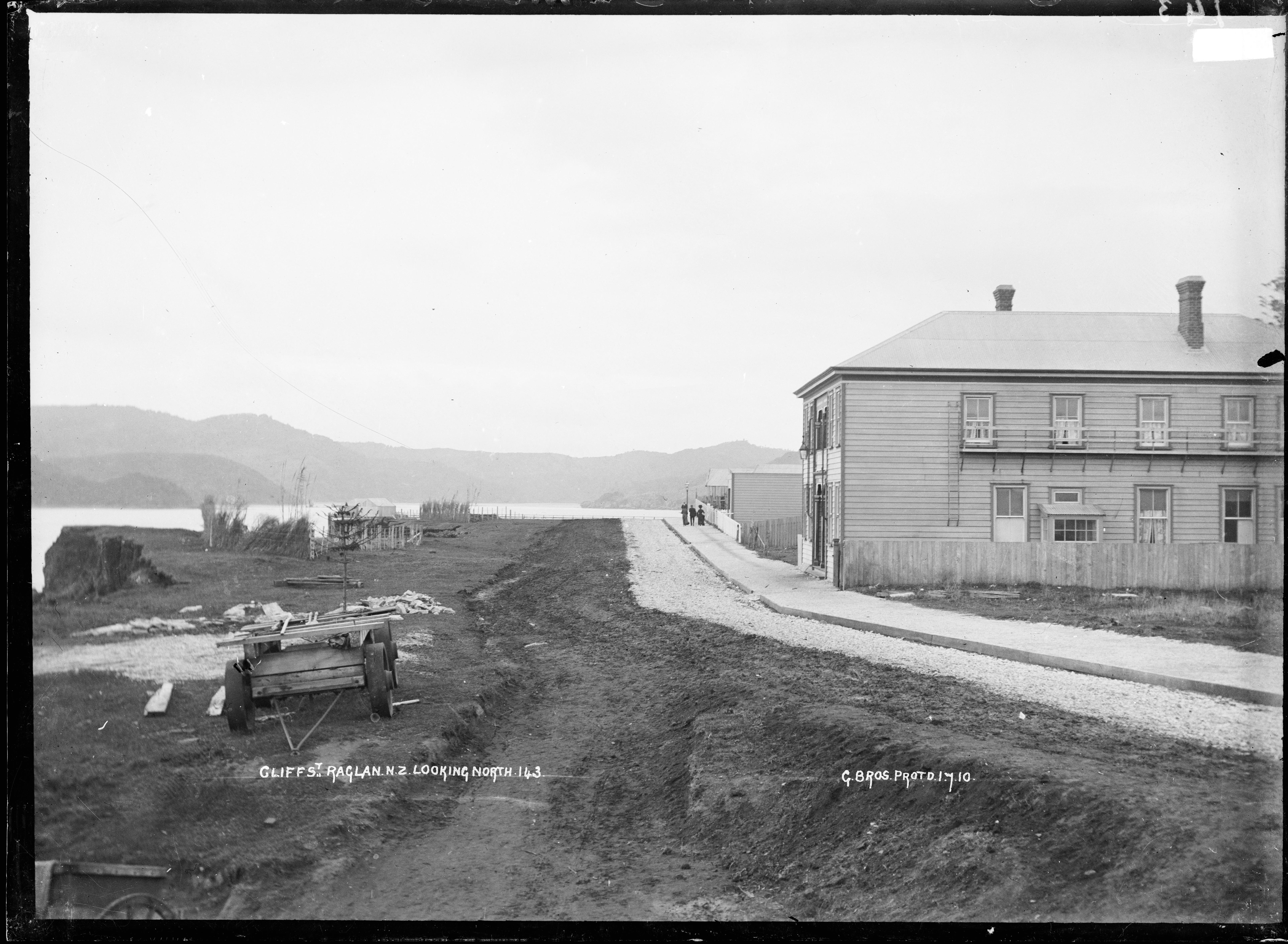
Cliff Street in 1910, just after it had been metalled. The Royal Hotel burnt down in 1931

The Ngāti Māhanga iwi occupied the area around Raglan in the late 18th century. There are at least 81 archaeological sites in the area, mainly near the coast. Limited radiocarbon dating puts the earliest sites at about 1400AD. The Māori people named the site Whāingaroa ("the long pursuit"). One tradition says that Tainui priest, Rakataura, crossed Whāingaroa on his way to Kāwhia. Another says it was among the places the early Te Arawa explorer, Kahumatamomoe, with his nephew Īhenga, visited on their expedition from Maketū.

The first Europeans to settle in the area, the Rev James and Mary Wallis, Wesleyan missionaries, were embraced and welcomed by local Māori in 1835. European settlement, including large scale conversion of land to pasture, began in the mid-1850s after Chief Wiremu Neera Te Awaitaia sold 25,091 acres (10,154 ha), extending from Raglan to Te Uku, to the Crown for £400 in 1851. However, £58 may still be owing, as investigation by the Waitangi Tribunal showed "no evidence as to how or whether" a claim by Wi Neera's son was resolved.

The name "Raglan", adopted in 1858, honours Fitzroy Somerset, 1st Lord Raglan (1788–1855), who had commanded the British forces in the Crimean War of 1853–1856.

The Raglan economy initially featured flax and timber exports, followed by farming which remains the mainstay of the area.

Raglan's first coach link to Hamilton began in 1880 and a telegraph wire was put up beside the road in 1884. In 1904 Raglan was linked to Hamilton telephone exchange. Mains electricity came in 1935 and a sewage scheme in 1977.

Tourism and the arts are significant contributors to the current economy. Raglan and District Museum/ Te Whare Taonga o Whāingaroa contains historic artefacts and archives from the region. A new museum building was built in 2011. Additionally, the Raglan and District Museum's online collection can be accessed here.

=== Traffic ===
A government subsidy was given in 1878, to promote the start of regular steamer services from Manukau Harbour, which took about 8 hours. Until the main road was metalled in 1921, most goods travelled by sea. The wharf remained important until the 1950s, peaking in 1954, with 15,462 tons, handled by 38 ships. One of the problems was the shallow bar at the entrance to the harbour. For example, the Holmburn was stuck there for 26 hours in 1962. However, like other small ports, the main problem was the introduction of the inter-island roll-on roll-off ferries in 1962, with 40 Watersiders Union members made redundant in 1972, though cement volumes increased to a peak of 41,351 tons in 1974. Again the bar was a problem for the larger cement ships and, since John Wilson (1961-85 246 ft (75 m) long, 42 ft (13 m) wide, 18.5 ft (5.6 m) deep, 1679 Grt) made the last call on 7 July 1982, the only goods landed at the harbour have been fish from the fishing boats.

=== Wharves ===
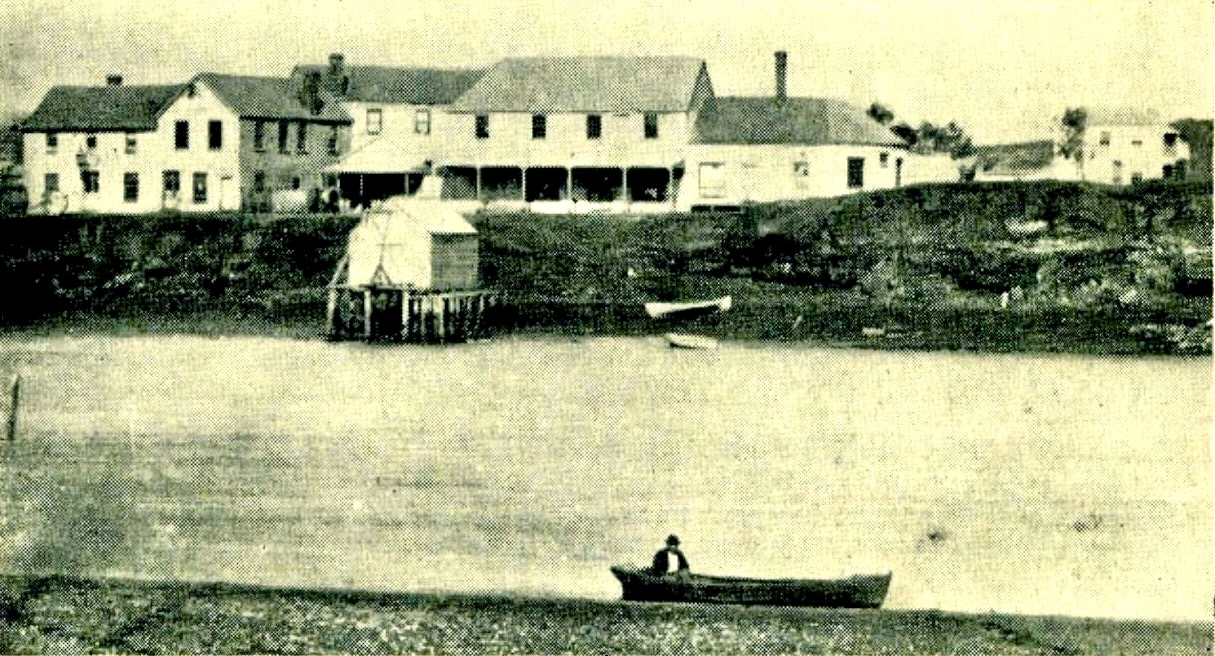
Royal Hotel and Gilmour's Store, with the 1874 jetty in front in about 1880

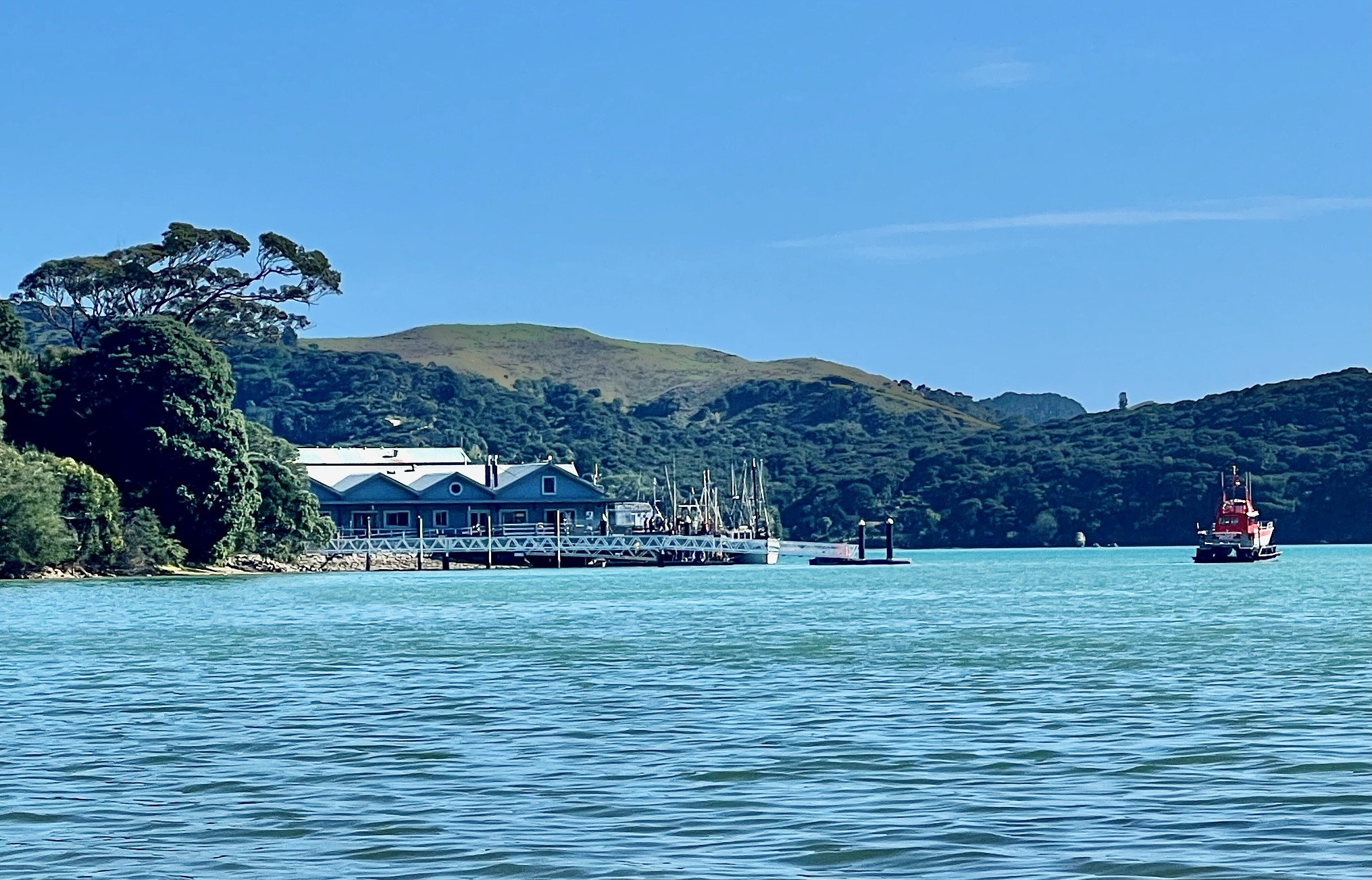
Raglan wharf and pontoon from the east in 2023

Until 1874 goods were transferred off the beach below Cliff Street and small boats moored in a boat harbour, cut off from the harbour by construction of a sluice-gate under Wallis Street causeway in about 1918. The new road gave access to a new dairy factory and the wharf opened in 1921. A small wooden jetty and storage shed beside Cliff Street was built in 1874. That was replaced by a stone jetty about 1 ch (20 m) to the west in 1881, which remains in place at the foot of the main street. A 250yd wooden pier was built in 1889 to the east at the end of James Street, enabling the larger Northern Steamship vessels to moor in deep water, beside a larger storage shed. Two totara piles remain from that Long Wharf, which was replaced by the current concrete wharf, opened in 1921. The wharf was enlarged for construction of a cement silo for Golden Bay Cement in 1967 and a further silo was built in 1973. Cement was supplied for the construction of Huntly power station and the Kaimai tunnel. A fire destroyed the 1921 shed in 2010. A pontoon was added to the east side of the wharf in 2023 as part of a $2.5m Provincial Growth scheme and steps on the other side, with an additional $3.2m of Better Off funding.

=== Airfield ===
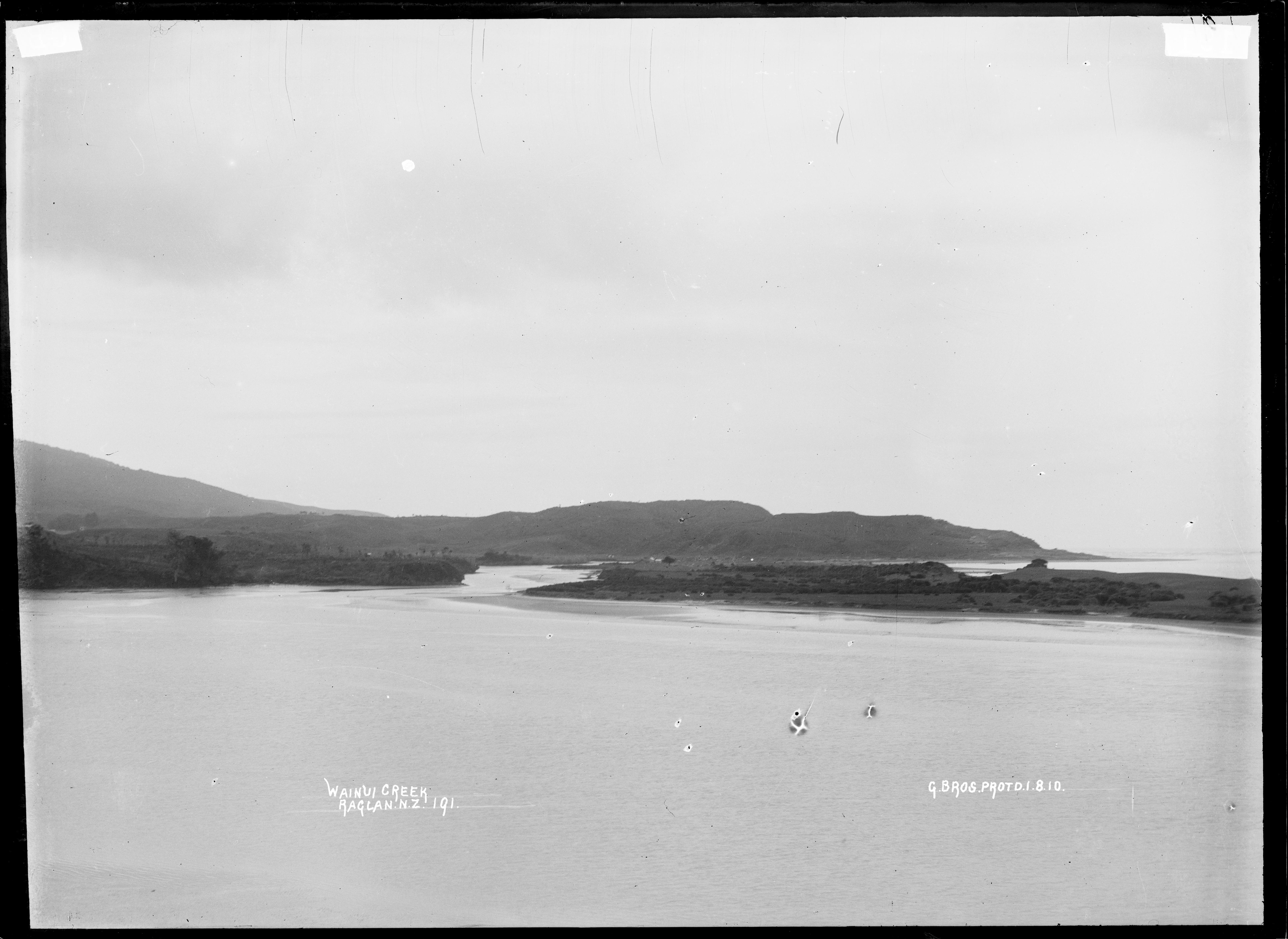
The airfield was formed in 1941 by levelling the dunes on the right of this 1910 photo. The area to the left became Raglan West in the late 1940s

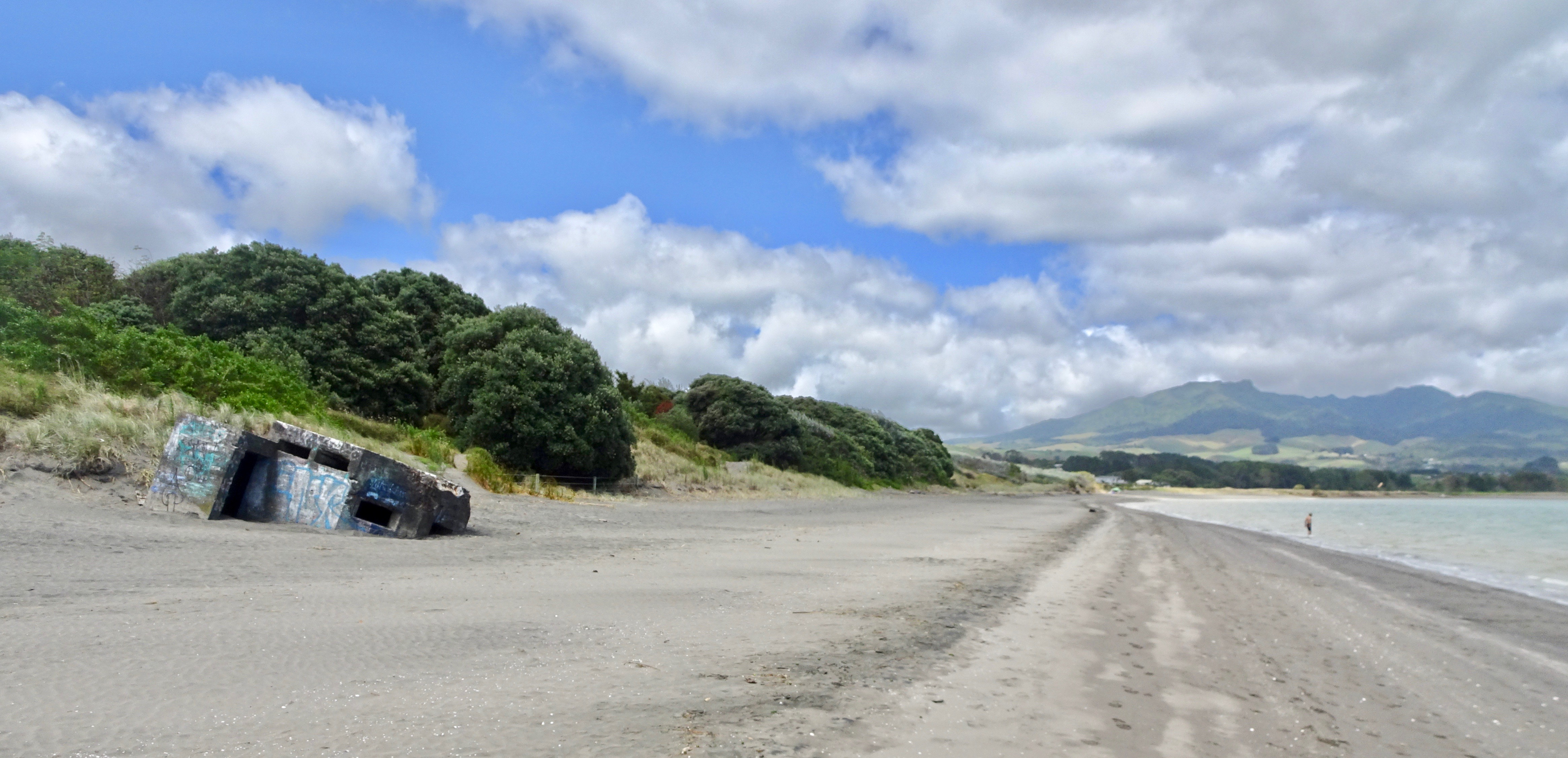
Wainamu Beach, 1942 'Type 22' pillbox and Karioi. One of the airfield windsocks is visible in the middle distance. Another pillbox is beyond the windsock

The town became the scene of public civil disobedience campaigns in the 1970s. In 1941, during World War II (1939–1945), the New Zealand Government took local ancestral land from indigenous Māori owners to construct a military airfield. When no longer required for defence purposes, part of the land, a 62-acre (25 ha) block, was not returned to the owners, but instead was transferred to Raglan County Council in 1953 and became the public Raglan golf-course in 1968.

There ensued widespread protest and attempts to reoccupy the land; in 1978, 20 Māori protesters were arrested on the ninth hole of the golf course. The land was eventually returned to the owners. 150 people were involved in the protest. It became a focus for local job-training and employment programs, as well as for the Māori sovereignty movement. In 2021 the council suggested return of the rest of the land could still "take a number of years". Fencing of the airfield in 2021 halved its width and resulted in a petition to close it.

On August 21, 2022, local councillors unanimously voted to begin the process of returning the airfield land to its original Māori owners.

=== Local government ===
Raglan Highway Board existed from 1868 and merged with the Karioi Board between 1888 and 1892. Raglan Town Board started in 1878 and merged with the highways boards into Raglan County Council in 1889. It was re-inaugurated as Raglan Town Board in 1906 and continued until 1938, when the Board again merged into the County Council. In 1954 Raglan became a county township, administered by a committee of 7 under the jurisdiction of the county council. On 26 March 1957 Raglan Town Committee resigned due to the unsympathetic attitude of the council. Within a month more than 100 ratepayers had petitioned the Governor-General to establish a town board. The Local Government Act 1974 brought about Raglan Community Council, which was replaced by Raglan Community Board in 1989, when Waikato District Council was formed.

== Demographics ==
In 1859, the local magistrate, F. D. Fenton, reported the population of Whāingaroa as 424. That was the number shown in the 1858 census for the Ngāti Mahanga population of Raglan. That accords with Ferdinand von Hochstetter's account of his 1859 tour, when he said that the Māori population was estimated at 400 and said that he had been told there were 122 Europeans, including 20 farmer-families. Hochstetter said there were six or eight houses, with a tavern and a store in Raglan and a Māori village and an old pā at Horea on the north shore. Many of the Europeans were evacuated in 1860 and again in 1863, when war threatened and it was said 95 inhabitants remained.

After that, as the graph below shows, Raglan's population recovered slowly until the main road from Hamilton was completely metalled in 1921 and then grew again after completion of tar-sealing in 1961.

The population of the Raglan ward (covering most of the harbour catchment area) was 4680 in 2006. It had increased to 4920 in 2013.

Raglan covers 7.22 km^{2} (2.79 sq mi) and had an estimated population of 3,910 as of June 2025, with a population density of 542 people per km^{2}.

Historical population

Year	Pop.	±% p.a.
1878	68	—
1881	70	+0.97%
1886	56	−4.36%
1891	83	+8.19%
1896	137	+10.54%
1901	114	−3.61%
1906	154	+6.20%
1911	246	+9.82%
1916	217	−2.48%
1921	302	+6.83%
1931	350	+1.49%
1936	377	+1.50%

Year	Pop.	±% p.a.
1945	518	+3.59%
1951	895	+9.54%
1961	1,019	+1.31%
1971	1,058	+0.38%
1981	1,414	+2.94%
1991	2,316	+5.06%
1996	2,634	+2.61%
2001	2,667	+0.25%
2006	2,637	−0.23%
2013	2,757	+0.64%
2018	3,327	+3.83%
2023	3,717	+2.24%

The 2006 population is for a smaller area of 4.90 km^{2} (1.89 sq mi). Earlier populations may be for different boundaries.

Raglan had a population of 3,717 in the 2023 New Zealand census, an increase of 390 people (11.7%) since the 2018 census, and an increase of 960 people (34.8%) since the 2013 census. There were 1,785 males, 1,917 females and 15 people of other genders in 1,416 dwellings. 3.1% of people identified as LGBTIQ+. The median age was 41.2 years (compared with 38.1 years nationally). There were 741 people (19.9%) aged under 15 years, 495 (13.3%) aged 15 to 29, 1,824 (49.1%) aged 30 to 64, and 657 (17.7%) aged 65 or older.

People could identify as more than one ethnicity. The results were 84.6% European (Pākehā); 24.8% Māori; 2.7% Pasifika; 3.4% Asian; 2.4% Middle Eastern, Latin American and African New Zealanders (MELAA); and 2.5% other, which includes people giving their ethnicity as "New Zealander". English was spoken by 96.9%, Māori language by 8.7%, and other languages by 12.3%. No language could be spoken by 2.2% (e.g. too young to talk). New Zealand Sign Language was known by 0.5%. The percentage of people born overseas was 23.2, compared with 28.8% nationally.

Religious affiliations were 23.0% Christian, 0.3% Hindu, 0.1% Islam, 1.0% Māori religious beliefs, 0.7% Buddhist, 1.0% New Age, 0.2% Jewish, and 1.7% other religions. People who answered that they had no religion were 65.5%, and 6.8% of people did not answer the census question.

Of those at least 15 years old, 999 (33.6%) people had a bachelor's or higher degree, 1,386 (46.6%) had a post-high school certificate or diploma, and 588 (19.8%) people exclusively held high school qualifications. The median income was $36,600, compared with $41,500 nationally. 369 people (12.4%) earned over $100,000 compared to 12.1% nationally. The employment status of those at least 15 was that 1,353 (45.5%) people were employed full-time, 567 (19.1%) were part-time, and 90 (3.0%) were unemployed.

Growth by about 500 households is expected by 2045 and to 12,500 by 2070, with several new suburbs.

Property prices have risen sharply since 2000, for example by 49.6% from 2014 to 2017 and a further 42% to 2020. That coincides with a decline in the Māori proportion of the population –

	2006 (%)	2013 (%)	2018 (%)
European	72.6	80.9	82.9
Māori	29.7	27.3	26.5
Pacific peoples	3.1	2.9	2.9
Asian	1.1	2.4	2.5
Middle Eastern/Latin American/African	0.2	0.7	1.6
Other ethnicity	8.8	1.3	1.2

By 2018 there were 6 fewer unoccupied private dwellings at 471, but those occupied had increased to 1,275.

Year	Average age	Households	Average income	National average
2001	37.4	1056	$14,200	$18,500
2006	37.8	1068	$18,900	$24,100
2013	39.7	1143	$24,900	$27,900
2018	39.6	1275	$27,200	$31,800

Employment and commuting increased between 2006 and 2013, as shown in this table.

Commuting type	Totals, 2006	Totals, 2013	2018
Live and work in area unit	432	504	
Commute out (mainly to Hamilton)	402	519	477
Commute in (mainly from the neighbouring country areas)	177	282	318
Total people working in area unit	609	786	

== Marae ==
Raglan has several marae within 25 km (16 mi), affiliated with hapū of Waikato Tainui:

- Poihākena Marae and Tainui a Whiro meeting house is a meeting place for Ngāti Tāhinga and Tainui hapū
- Te Kōpua Marae is a meeting place of Tainui hapū and does not have a meeting house, as it was destroyed on 12 August 1941 to create the airfield A 60 ft (18 m) × 25 ft (7.6 m) meeting house had been built there in 1913 for a coronation ceremony for King Te Rata Mahuta.
- Te Kaharoa or Aramiro Marae and Te Kaharoa meeting house is a meeting place of Ngāti Māhanga and Ngāti Tamainupō, near the head of the Waitetuna valley

The hapū of Ngāti Tamainupō also have a meeting place, Mai Uenuku ki te Whenua Marae, in the inner harbour, between Te Uku and Waingaro.

In 2018, it produced a local history book about prominent Waikato chief Ngaere and how Ngāruawāhia and the Hakarimata Ranges were named in the late 1600s.

In October 2020, the Government committed $414,300 from the Provincial Growth Fund to upgrade Mai Uenuku ki te Whenua Marae, creating 8 jobs.

== Geography ==
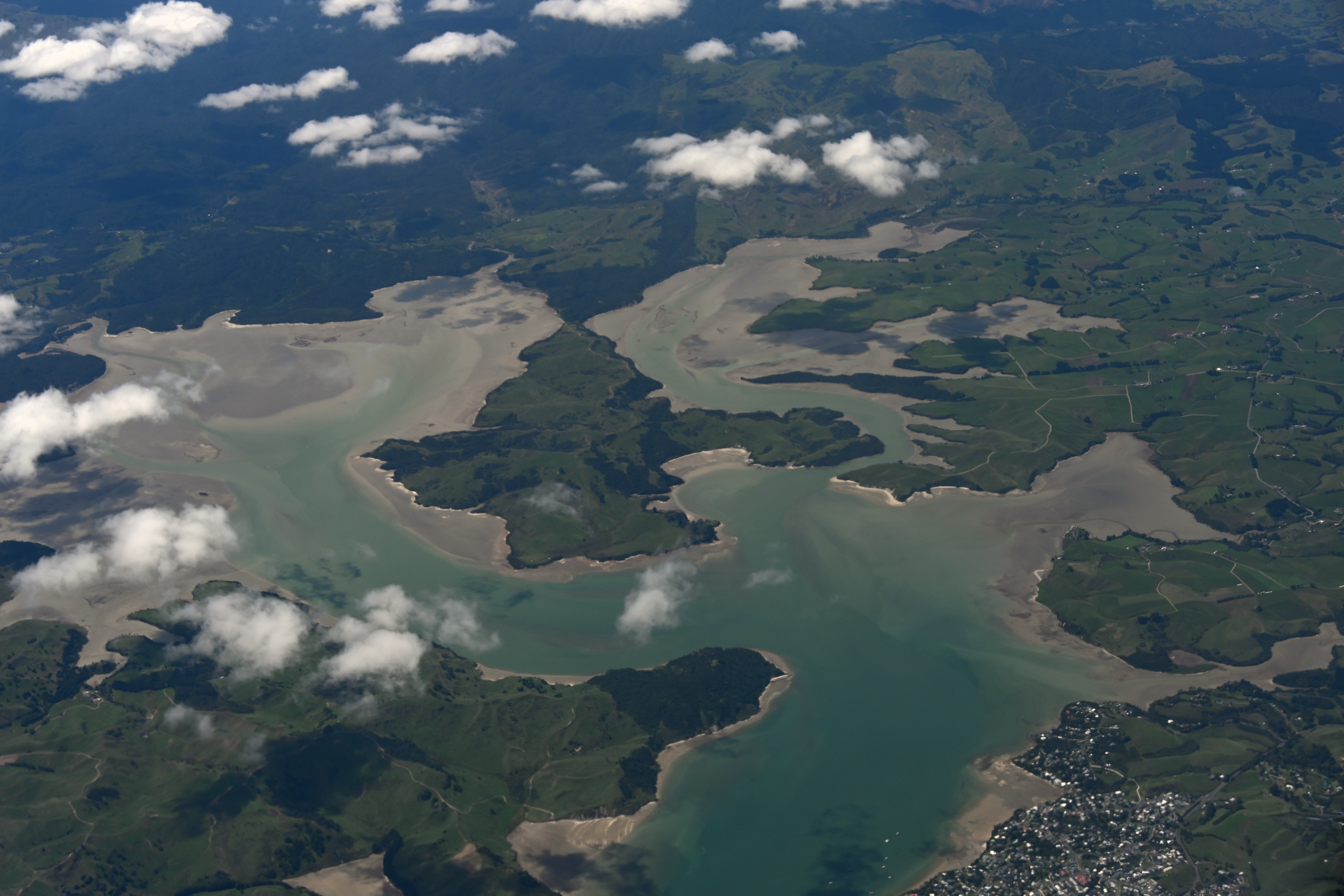
An aerial photograph of Raglan Harbour with the Paritata Peninsula at centre.

Raglan is associated with Whāingaroa Harbour (also known as Raglan Harbour) on the west coast of the Waikato region in New Zealand's North Island. The harbour catchment extends as far north as Glen Afton, covers 525 km^{2} (203 sq mi) and the harbour covers 35 km^{2} (14 sq mi) and has 133 km (83 mi), 137.32 km (85.33 mi), or 220 km (140 mi), of coastline. It runs 12 km inland from the entrance, for the most part is less than 2 km wide, has a high-tide area of 32.96 km^{2} (12.73 mi^{2}), a low-tide area of 9.01 km^{2} (3.48 mi^{2}), 2–4 m tidal range, with a spring-tide range of 2.8 m and neap 1.8 m, spring tide flow around 46 × 10^{6} m^{3} and neap 29 × 10^{6} m^{3}. A 2005 survey said on average water stays in the harbour 1.1 days at spring-tides, but a 2015 study showed a median residence time for whole estuary of 39.4 days with median river flows, ranging between 18 and 45 days. It is the northernmost of three large inlets in the Waikato coast (the others, also drowned river valleys, are Aotea Harbour and Kawhia Harbour). 15 significant rivers and streams run into the harbour, including the largest, Waingaro and Waitetuna, accounting for 60% of catchment area, and the smaller Opotoru and Tawatahi rivers. Total length of the streams is 826 km (513 mi).

A study for Regional Council said, "Whāingaroa Harbour began to fill with sediment at least 8000 years before present (B.P.) and before the sea had reached its present level 6500 years B.P. Rapid sedimentation in the harbour before 6500 years B.P. is attributed to the formation of now relict intertidal shore platforms up to 700-m wide and ≤10 m below present-day mean high water level. These coastal landforms were rapidly formed 8000-6500 years B.P. by physical weathering of soft mudstone cliffs and wave action. Consequently, all but the upper two metres of the present day sediment column was deposited before 6000 years B.P. and thousands of years before the arrival of Maori some 700 years ago. Today, the harbour has largely infilled with catchment sediment up to ~8-m thick, with 70% of its high tide surface area being intertidal." It concluded that most sediment is now swept up to 20 km out to sea.

70% of the land in the harbour catchment is used for farming, 20% of it is under native vegetation, 14% under forestry, 7% mānuka/kānuka and 0.3% wetlands. 68% of land has slopes greater than 1 in 4.

Southwest of the township stands the extinct volcano of Mt Karioi. According to Māori legend Karioi was a jilted Māori Princess who, upon discovering that love was lost, lay down and rests.

North of the harbour mouth there are extensive dunes and dune-dammed lakes. Like the beaches, the dunes are rich in ironsand and have been considered for mining several times. Threats of seabed mining following passage of the Foreshore and Seabed Act 2004 resulted in formation of the opposition group KASM, based in Raglan (see also Mining in New Zealand and Sand mining).

The area is also home to the popular tourist destination, Bridal Veil Falls, which is located 20 kilometres southeast of the township and the unusual Lake Disappear 4 km further on.

=== Suburbs ===
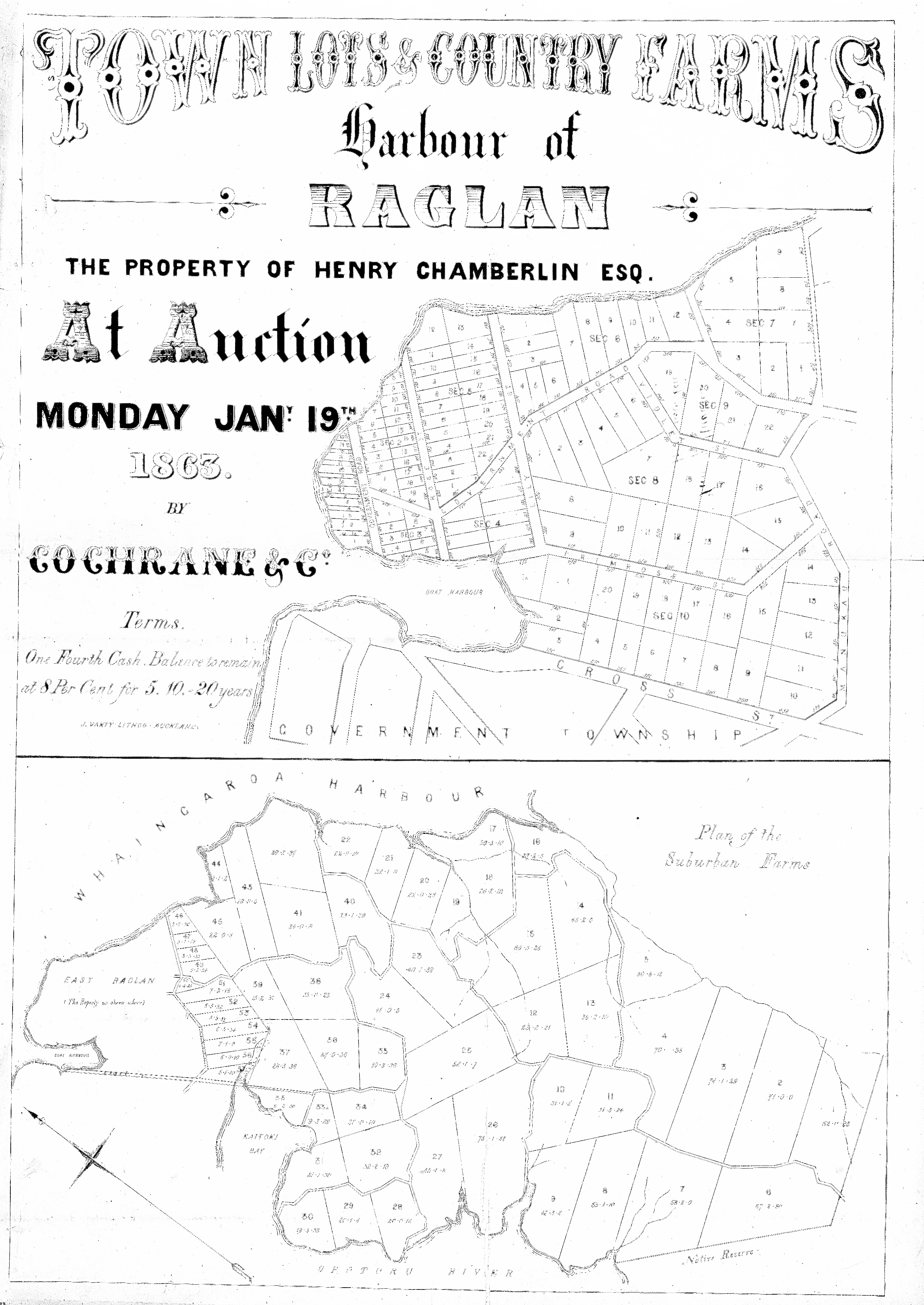
1863 plans of Raglan East

==== Raglan East ====
Raglan East was Raglan's first suburb. It was formed after Henry Chamberlin sold his estate in 1863.

==== Raglan West ====
Raglan West developed after the farm containing the site of the Wesleyan Nihinihi mission station (see History above) was surveyed between 1940 and 1952.

==== Rangitahi ====
Rangitahi was the name of a farm. A concrete bridge from Raglan West replaced a tidal causeway in 2019 and work started on developing 259 residential lots. Over 550 houses are being built in stages on 117 ha (290 acres).

=== Climate ===
Average annual rainfall at Raglan 1984–2004 was 1.354m a year. Average temperature and rainfall graphs show an average high of 24C in February and an average low of 8C in July. Raglan usually has no more than a degree of frost and then only for a few hours on occasional winter mornings.

Climate data for Raglan, New Zealand (1981–2010)
Month	Jan	Feb	Mar	Apr	May	Jun	Jul	Aug	Sep	Oct	Nov	Dec	Year
Mean daily maximum °C (°F)	23.3 (73.9)	23.9 (75.0)	22.5 (72.5)	19.9 (67.8)	16.9 (62.4)	14.6 (58.3)	14 (57)	14.8 (58.6)	16.2 (61.2)	17.7 (63.9)	19.7 (67.5)	21.6 (70.9)	18.8 (65.8)
Daily mean °C (°F)	18.6 (65.5)	19.1 (66.4)	17.7 (63.9)	15.3 (59.5)	12.6 (54.7)	10.4 (50.7)	9.6 (49.3)	10.5 (50.9)	12 (54)	13.5 (56.3)	15.3 (59.5)	17.1 (62.8)	14.3 (57.8)
Mean daily minimum °C (°F)	13.9 (57.0)	14.3 (57.7)	13 (55)	10.8 (51.4)	8.3 (46.9)	6.2 (43.2)	5.3 (41.5)	6.3 (43.3)	7.9 (46.2)	9.4 (48.9)	11 (52)	12.6 (54.7)	9.9 (49.8)
Average precipitation mm (inches)	88 (3.5)	83 (3.3)	99 (3.9)	106 (4.2)	128 (5.0)	151 (5.9)	149 (5.9)	131 (5.2)	120 (4.7)	113 (4.4)	104 (4.1)	107 (4.2)	1,379 (54.3)
Source: Climate Data

== Education ==
Raglan Area School is a co-educational state composite school covering years 1 to 13, with a roll of 597 as of July 2026. There have been schools at Raglan since 1866. The current school opened as Raglan District High School in 1937.

There are also primary schools in the nearby settlements of Te Mata, Te Uku and Waitetuna, it is very common in recent years for students to move from the Te Mata, Te Uku and Waitetuna primary schools to RAS when they reach high school due to it being a nearby, bicultural and accepting school full of students that have often already met their contemporaries from Te Mata, Te Uku and Waitetuna.

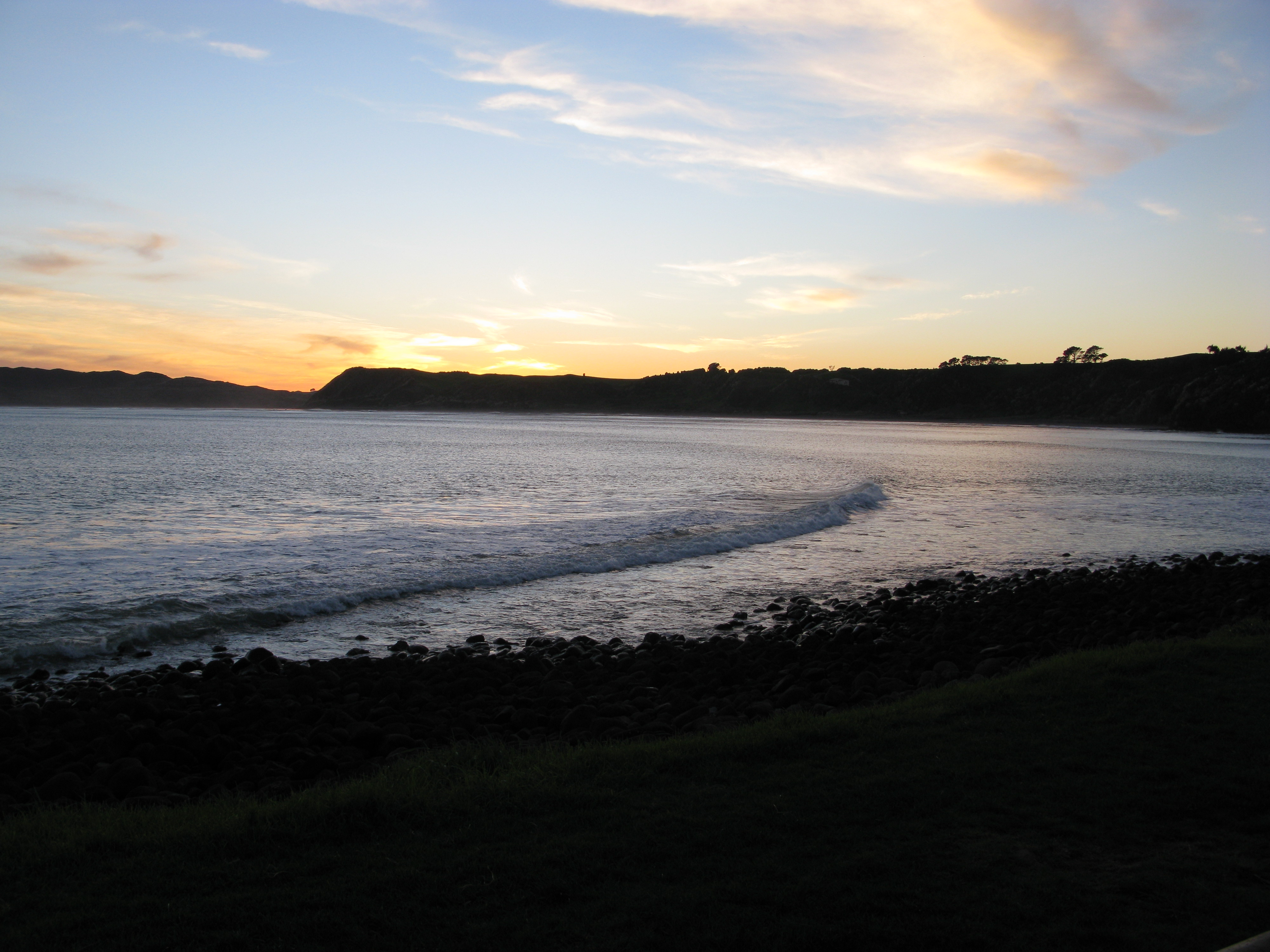
View from Manu Bay in Raglan

== Culture ==
=== Arts ===
Visual artists hold regular exhibitions at the Raglan Old School Art Centre. Fabric artists show their creations in the biennial ArtoWear competition. There is also a Raglan Arts Trail Guide with an Open Studio Weekend in late January. For Matariki there are displays of Māori art. Local art is on display in the Show Off Gallery, Kanuka Design, Matapihi Gallery, local cafes and the Raglan Old School Arts Centre. The Arts Centre is in a 19th-century heritage building, the former Raglan School.

=== Markets ===
There is a regular market on the second Sunday of every month at the Raglan Old School Arts Centre in Stewart Street. This Raglan Creative Market specialises in local crafts, food and art.

=== Music ===
Raglan has a live music scene. The International Soundsplash Eco Reggae Festival ran yearly in summer on the Wainui Reserve, between 2001 and 2008 and more recently, and attracted some of the biggest names in roots, reggae and dub, as well as local acts.

The main venue in Raglan for live music was the Yot Club, a regular stop for NZ musicians on national tours until 2024. There is still live music at the Yard, Orca Restaurant and Bar, the Harbour View Hotel, the Raglan Club and The Old School.

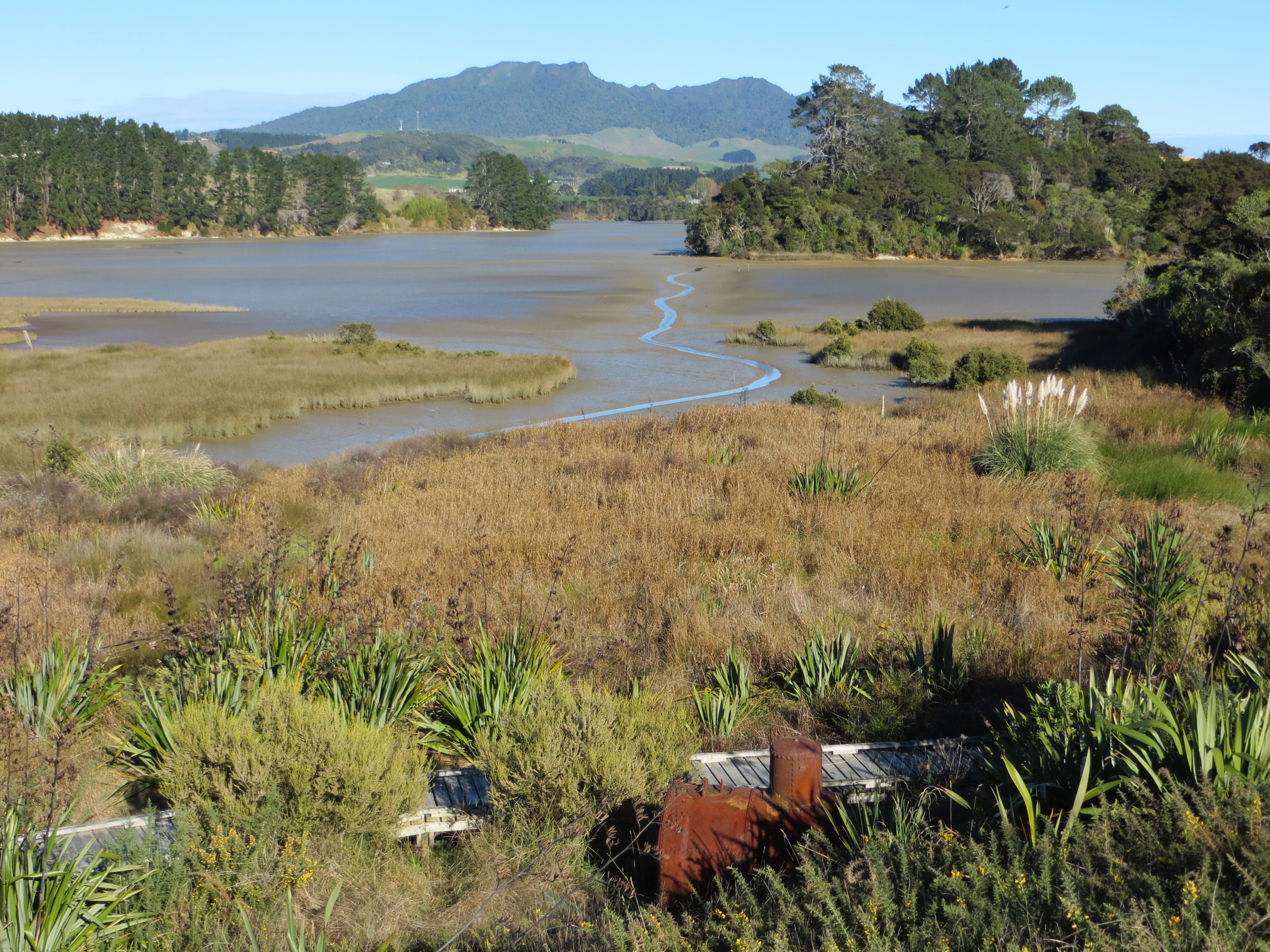
Kaitoke Walkway is on the south side of Raglan. At Flax Cove it has a boardwalk beside a boiler of a 1903, or 1904 flax mill

The New Zealand reggae bands Cornerstone Roots and Zionhill were formed in Raglan.

== Recreation ==
=== Surfing ===
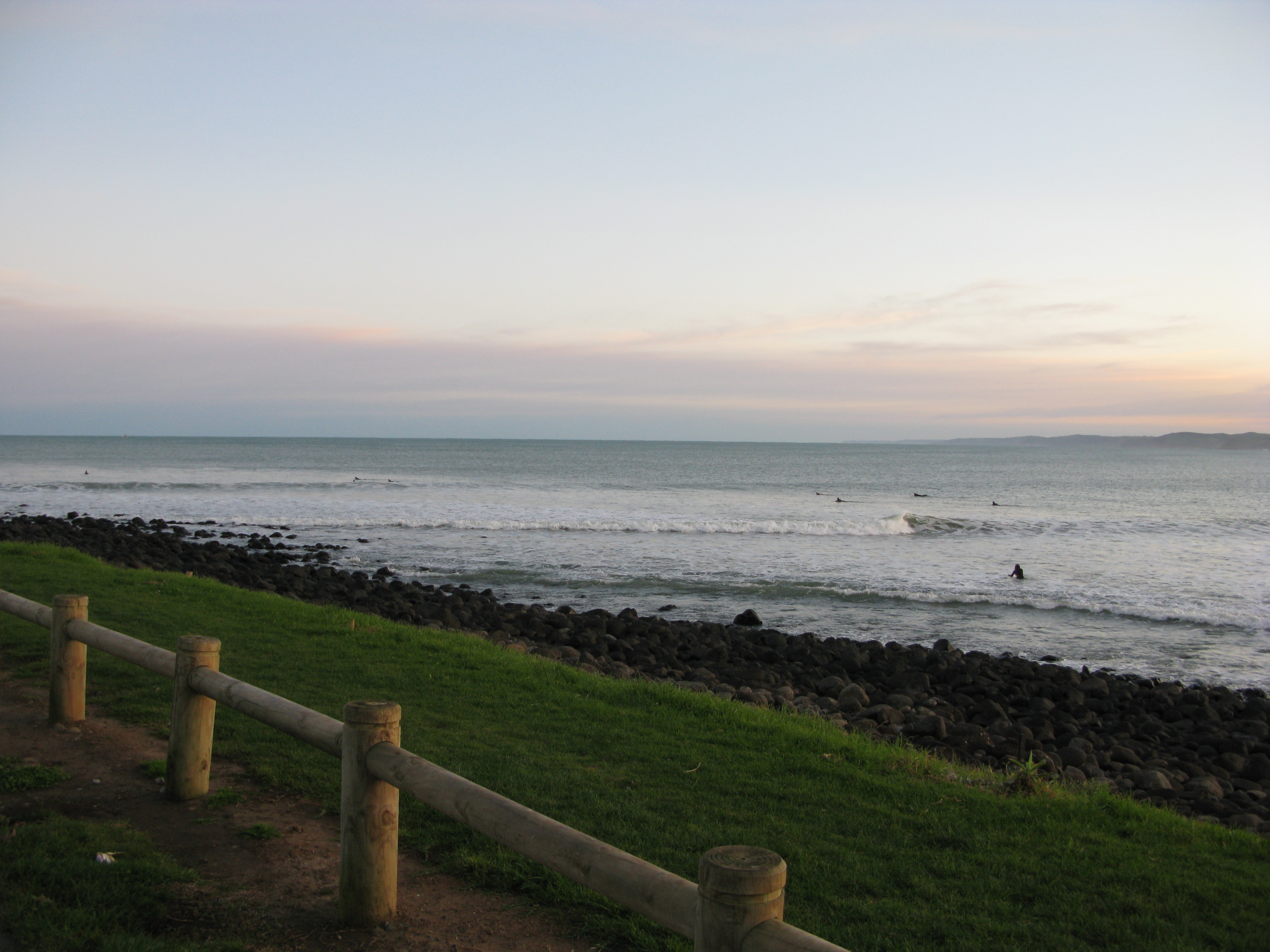
Surfers in Manu Bay

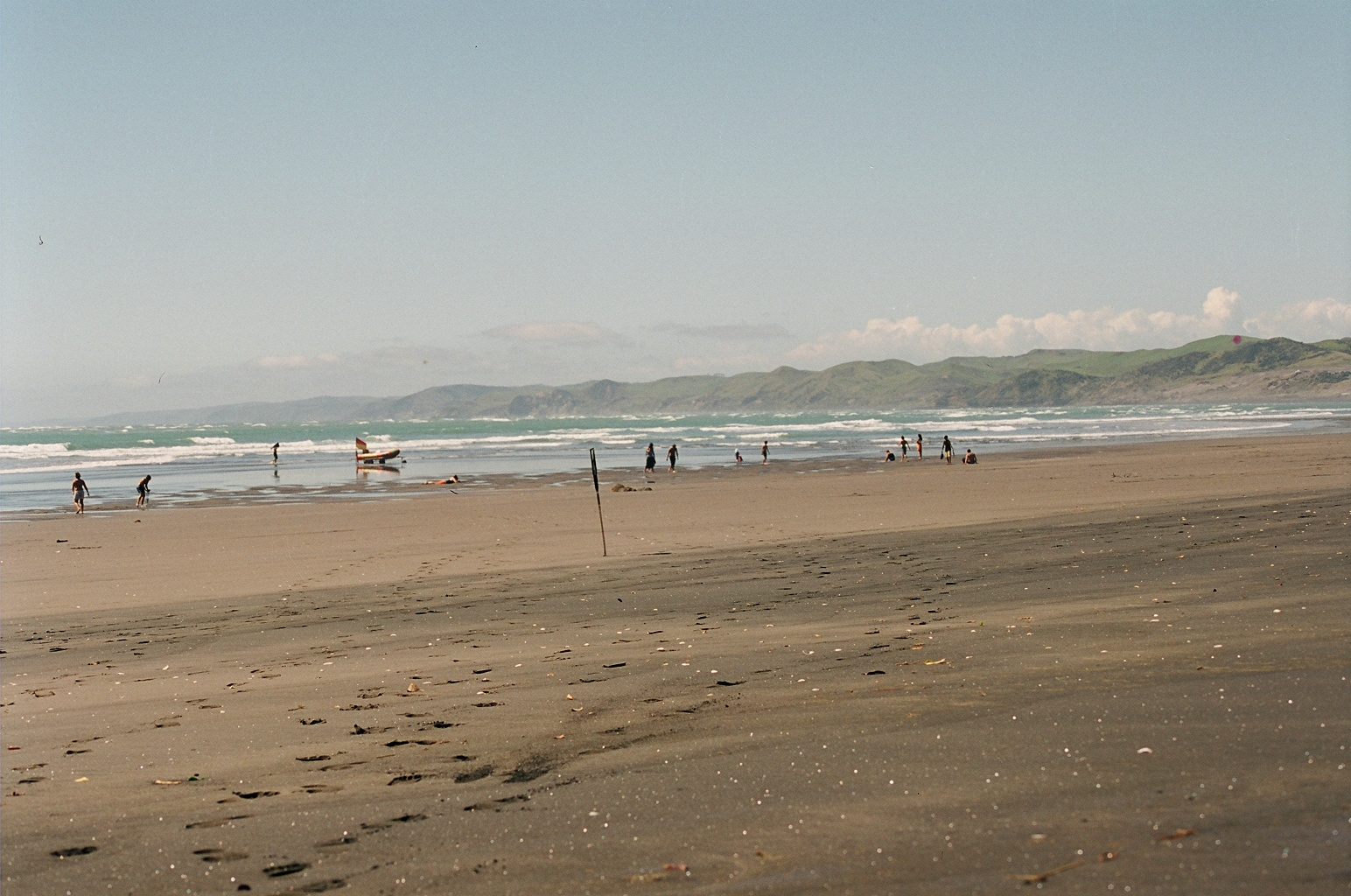
Raglan's black sand beach, December 2000

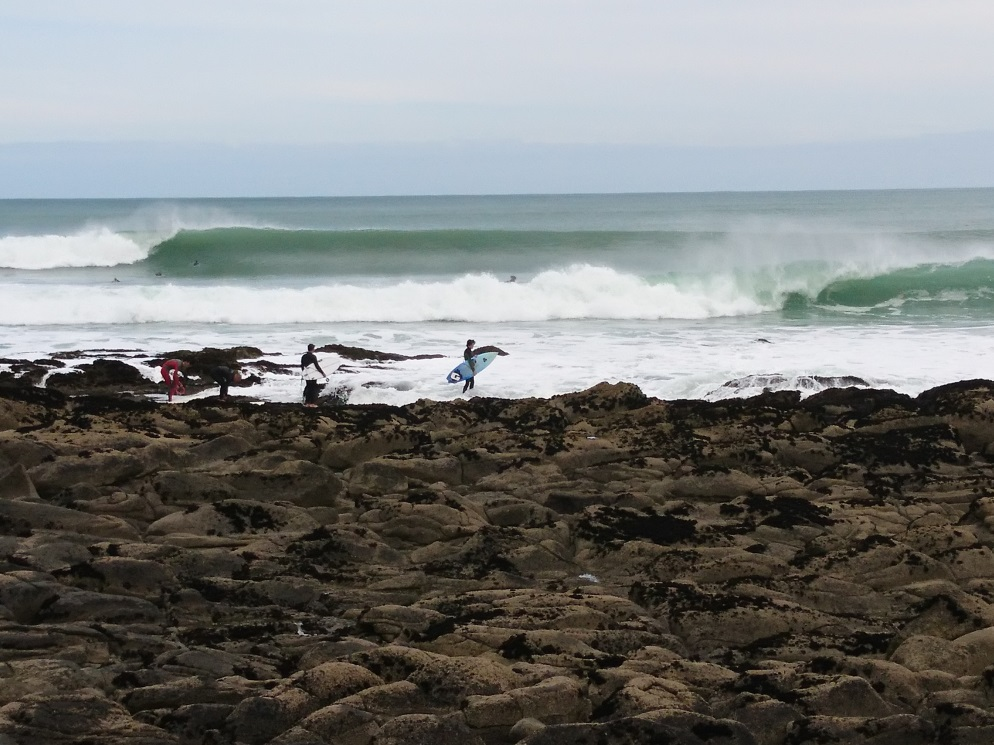
Whale Bay

Raglan is best known for its surf. Eight kilometres from the Raglan township is a series of surf breaks including Indicators, Whale Bay, Manu Bay, Vortex Bay. Manu Bay was featured in the 1966 movie The Endless Summer and in the 2010 movie Last Paradise. The traditional name for Manu Bay is 'Waikeri', meaning surging or swirling waters. The former native reserve was bought for a recreation reserve in 1971.

Indicators is a left hand point break that breaks for up to 600m, from 2 to 10 feet+ (Hawaiian scale). It is a long-walled, fast wave with occasional barrels, particularly on the low tide. It picks up a lot of swell and is very consistent. On big days the wave can link up with the next break called Whale Bay.

Whale Bay is a left hand point break that breaks up to 200m in length, from about 2 to 8 feet+. It has two sections, an inside hollow section up to about 4 feet that breaks very close to the rocks, and an outside, slower section from 4 feet up. It has been rumoured by locals to link up with the next break further down-Manu Point-but only on very large swells, making a potential ride of up to 2 km from the top of Indicators, which locals say has only been achieved once.

Manu Bay is a left hand point break which works from 2 to 10 feet+, breaking over 300m. It has alternate hollow and wall sections, occasional barrels, and is usually about 2/3 the size of Indicators.

Vortex Bay is a soft peak east of the boat ramp that sometimes breaks on low tide when the swell is too large for the main three points.

There is also a beach break further down from Manu Point. Ruapuke is another beach break well to the west around the point.

Raglan has hosted a world championship surfing event at Manu Bay in 1998. Raglan is also home to New Zealand's first sanctioned surf school, the Raglan Surfing School which was established in 1999.

=== Walking ===
Whāingaroa has a variety of walks, from an easy stroll over the footbridge to the more strenuous Mount Karioi tracks. Walking has been a popular activity here since at least 1915, when the guidebook said, "An hour's walk brings one to the harbour entrance and to the sea coast. Here there is a wide sandy beach with a background of bush-covered cliffs, and the picturesque Mount Karioi close at hand" and went on, "Many suitable landing places are to be found where parties may leave the launch for a ramble ashore or may picnic ‘neath the shade of the kowhai trees". (see also Walking trip resources below)

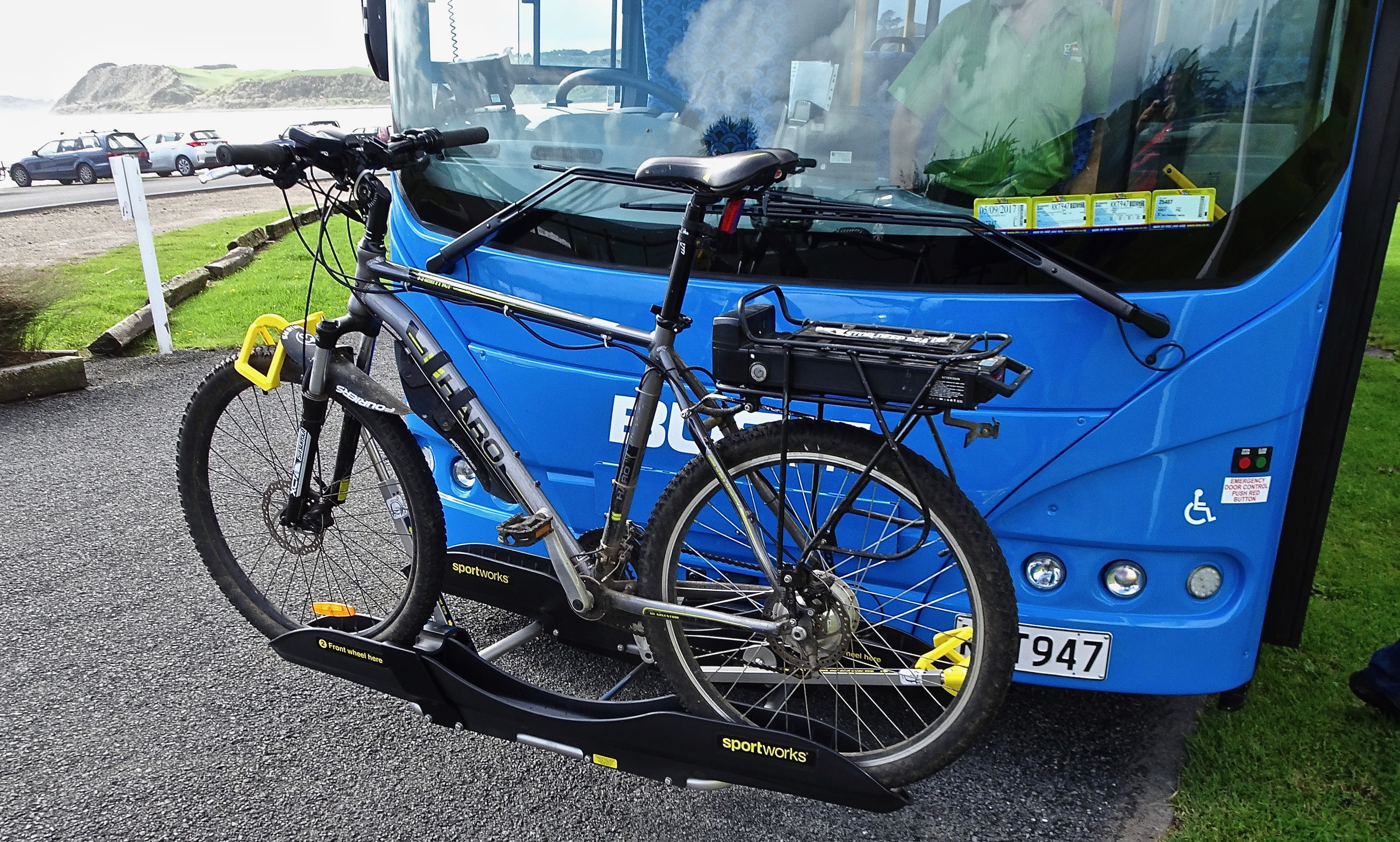
The Raglan bus carries bikes. Some buses run here to Manu Bay.

=== Cycling ===
Several sections of a Town2Surf cycle lane have been built, which will link the town with Ngarunui Beach, and Te Ara Kākāriki Ocean Trails opened on 3 December 2016, providing about 4 km (2.5 mi) of mountain bike trails in a pine forest on Wainui Reserve. A 43 km (27 mi) to 85 km (53 mi) bike race, mainly on gravel roads around Mt Karioi, took place each July, from 2009 to 2021 and revived in 2025. About 21 km (13 mi) from Raglan, Pipiwharauroa Way has 9 km (5.6 mi) of cycle/walking track, which links to a very difficult 7 km (4.3 mi) paper road to Waitetuna.

== Environment ==
Whāingaroa has a high proportion of environmentalists, as evidenced by the existence of several high-profile environmental groups. The proportion of environmentalists in Raglan is indicated by the size of the Green Party vote, which was 28% in 2011 and rose to 30% in 2014 (266 of 867 in the Taranaki-King Country constituency vote and 40 of 152 in Hauraki-Waikato). In 2017 it dropped to 20% (433), but the Labour vote rose from 18% to 40% (872), when Labour also highlighted environmental issues.

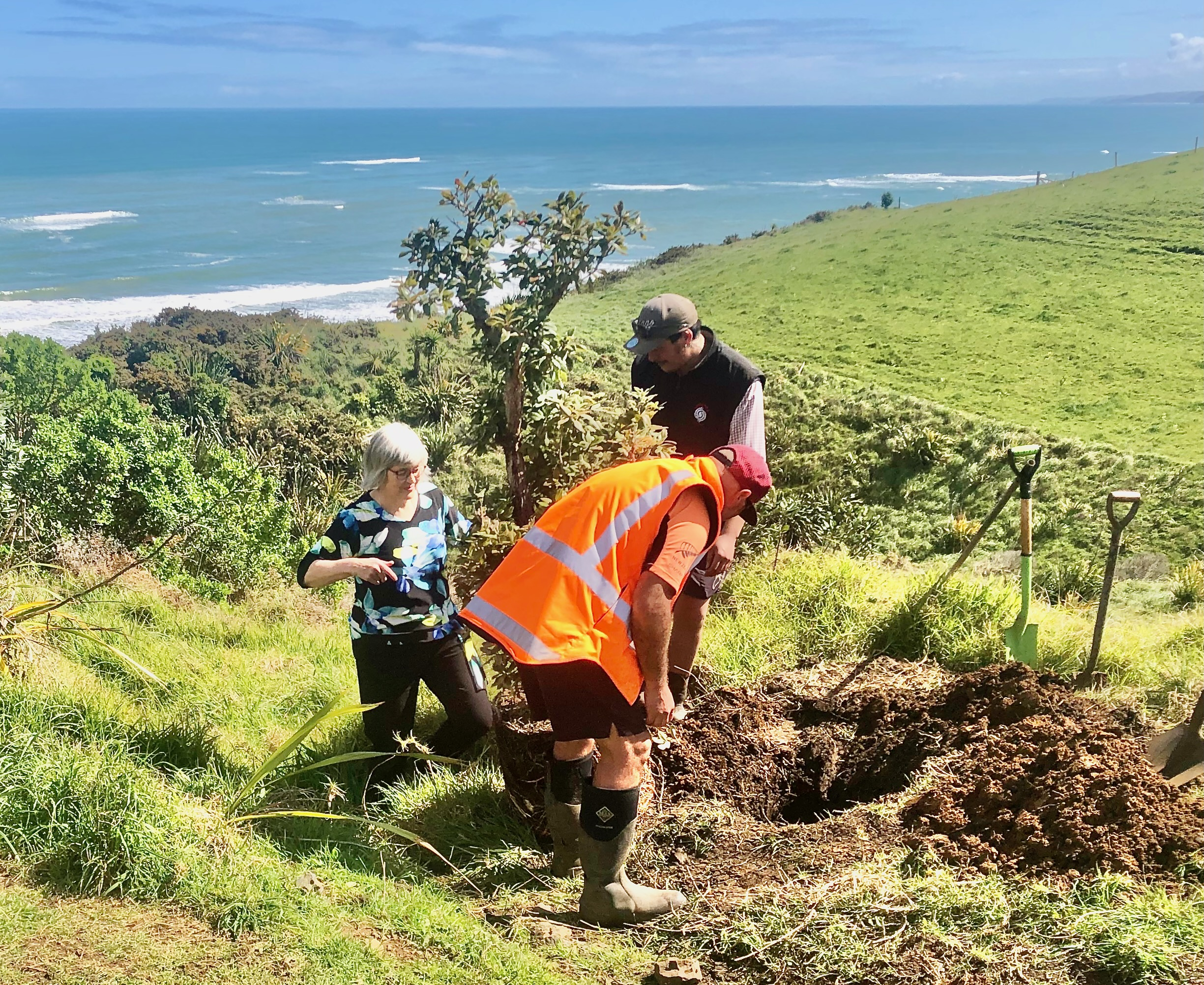
Planting of Whāingaroa Harbour Care's 2 millionth tree with Conservation Minister, Eugenie Sage in 2020

The environmentalism has been recognised in local government policy as, "passionate about the arts and protecting its environment".

=== Whāingaroa Harbour Care ===
Whāingaroa Harbour Care planted more than 2 million trees between 1995 and 2024.

After discussions in 1994 with the local MP and Minister for the Environment, Simon Upton, about the poor environmental state of the harbour, a meeting was held on 24 March 1995, leading to the formation of Whāingaroa Harbour Care Incorporated Society (WHC) in July 1995. A plant nursery was set up on Wainui Reserve to collect eco-sourced (with genes better adapted to local conditions) local seeds, grow them into native trees and plant them densely beside streams, to reduce run-off of nutrients and other pollutants by up to 60%. By 2013 over 40 farmers had fenced and planted about 450 km (280 mi) of riparian areas. WHC closed in January 2024.

=== Recycling ===
Recycling in Raglan is managed by a non-profit organization called Xtreme Zero Waste. Xtreme's stated goal is to create a waste management system for the Raglan/Whāingaroa community in which none of the waste is stored in landfills. The organization was founded in 2000, after Raglan's landfill closed and the town decided to find an alternative to transporting its waste elsewhere. Xtreme Waste has recycled an increasing volume and percentage of waste every year, and as of 2010, it diverts nearly three-quarters of the town's waste from reaching the landfill. It operates a recycling centre, which is open to the public and offers group tours.

Actor Antonio Te Maioha, who lives in Raglan, has publicly spoken about his own involvement and Raglan's leadership in recycling. He mentioned that Raglan is one of the few towns in New Zealand with recycling bins in the main street, and describes how people he knew became involved in recycling because of Xtreme Waste's programs.

== Water supply ==
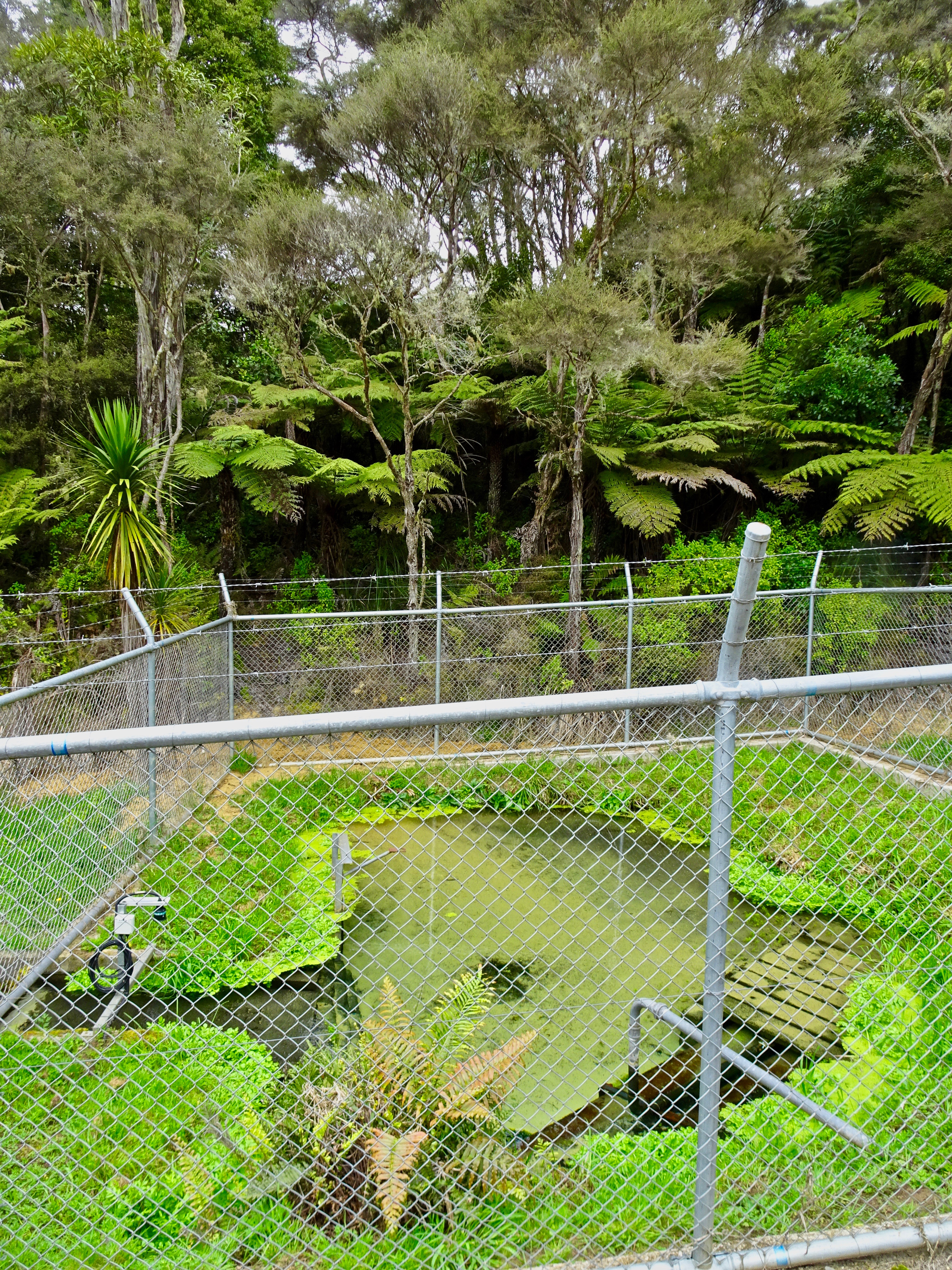
Waipatukahu or Riki Spring, source of Raglan's water

Raglan's water supply comes from a well and the nearby Waipatukahu (or Riki) Spring between Te Hutewai Rd and Omahina Creek, about 3 km (1.9 mi) south of Raglan, where water which has sunk into the volcanic rocks, seeps along the contact with the Tertiary beds.

Water is chlorinated, pumped to a 1,335 m^{3} (294,000 imp gal) tank and distributed through about 42 km (26 mi) of pipes. Tanks at Bow St (1,000 m^{3} (220,000 imp gal)) and Cornwall Rd, (1,250 m^{3} (270,000 imp gal)) maintain pressure. Demand has been forecast at 3,606 m^{3} (793,000 imp gal) per day by 2034, based on a Waikato University population prediction assuming consumption of 260 L (57 imp gal)/person/day. However, in December 2015 use was averaging 1,510 m^{3} (330,000 imp gal) a day. The capacity of the spring is 4,800 m^{3} (1,100,000 imp gal) per day. Consent allows up to 3,100 m^{3} (680,000 imp gal)/day (the remainder maintains a flow in the short stream below the spring) from the spring and 500 m^{3} (110,000 imp gal)/day from the well. Despite using less than half the consented water, water meters are planned to be installed and operational by 2017. When last rated Raglan's water got a poor 'Ed' (unsatisfactory level of risk) rating, but work was done in 2014 to upgrade the quality.

=== History ===
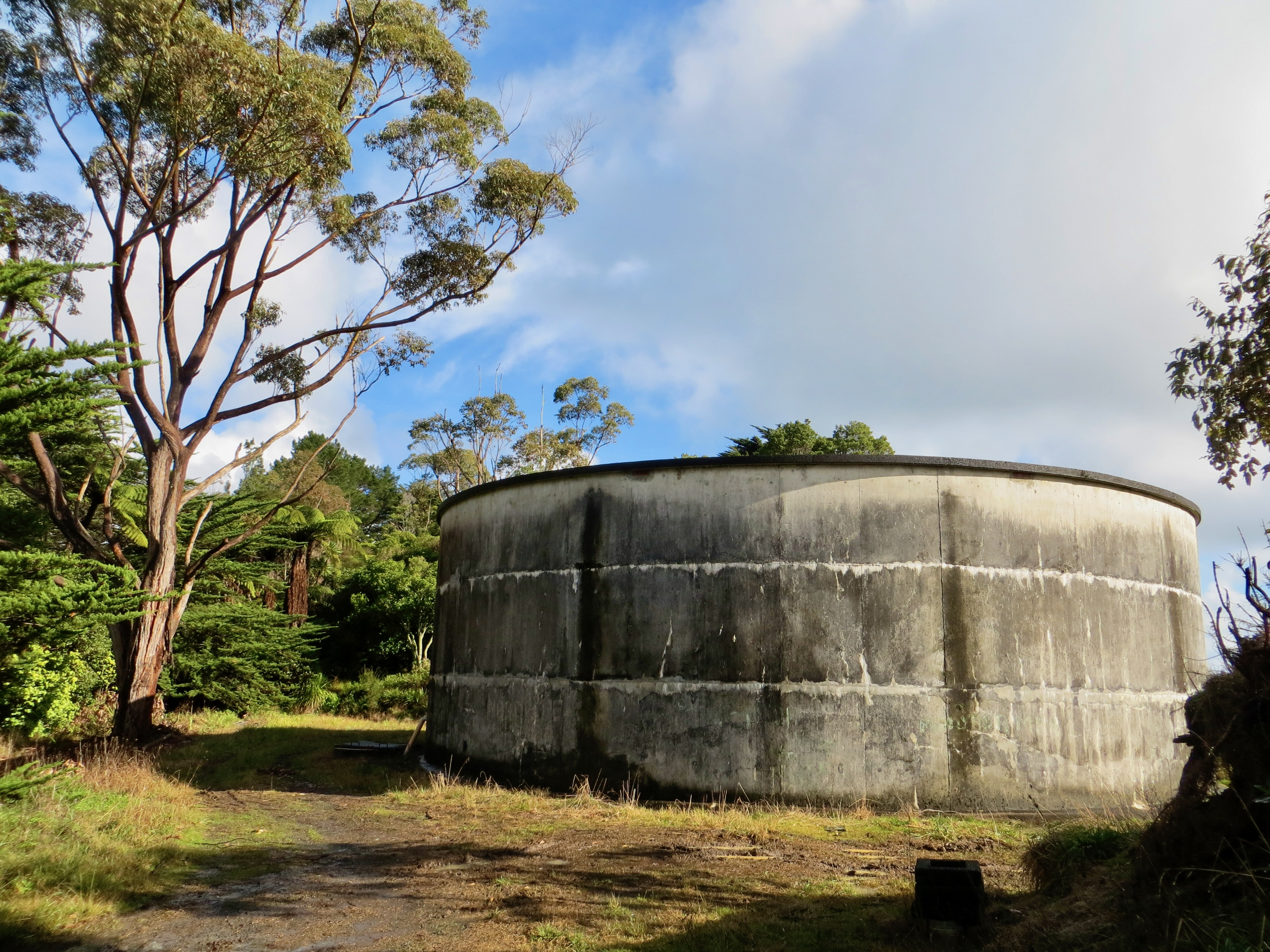
Raglan's water supply is stored in three water towers. This is the first, above Riki Spring

The spring was long used as a source of fresh water. In 1862 a dam was built and it was used to power an 8 ft (2.4 m) waterwheel for a flaxmill. In the early 1950s the spring was again used to power a water-wheel, this time pumping water for use on the farm.

Several residents had bores drilled, but over half (1000) relied on tank water. A 2½ in. bore behind the Harbour View Hotel had 1,920 imp gal (8.7 m^{3})/day rising to about 8 ft (2.4 m) below the surface, though rather hard and tinged with iron. Of its 160 ft (49 m) the first 50 ft. was in clay, 4 ft. in hard blue shingle tightly packed with a minimum of sandy matrix and 106 ft in papa. The 225 ft (69 m) deep, 3 in. bore for the dairy factory, 70 ft. above sea-level in Rose St, was polluted with ammoniacal nitrogen and chlorides too were high.

As early as 1927 the government was being asked for help with water and sewage. In 1938, ratepayers petitioned the council for a water supply and in 1938 DSIR reported on Waipatukahu Spring where, "Beautifully clear water rises in a pool perhaps 6 ft. across on the floor of Omahina Creek at a point some 10 ch (200 m) up from the south end of the tidal flat and a few chains above sea-level" and flow had been measured at 900,000 imp gal (4,100 m^{3})/day, close to the 4,800 mentioned above.

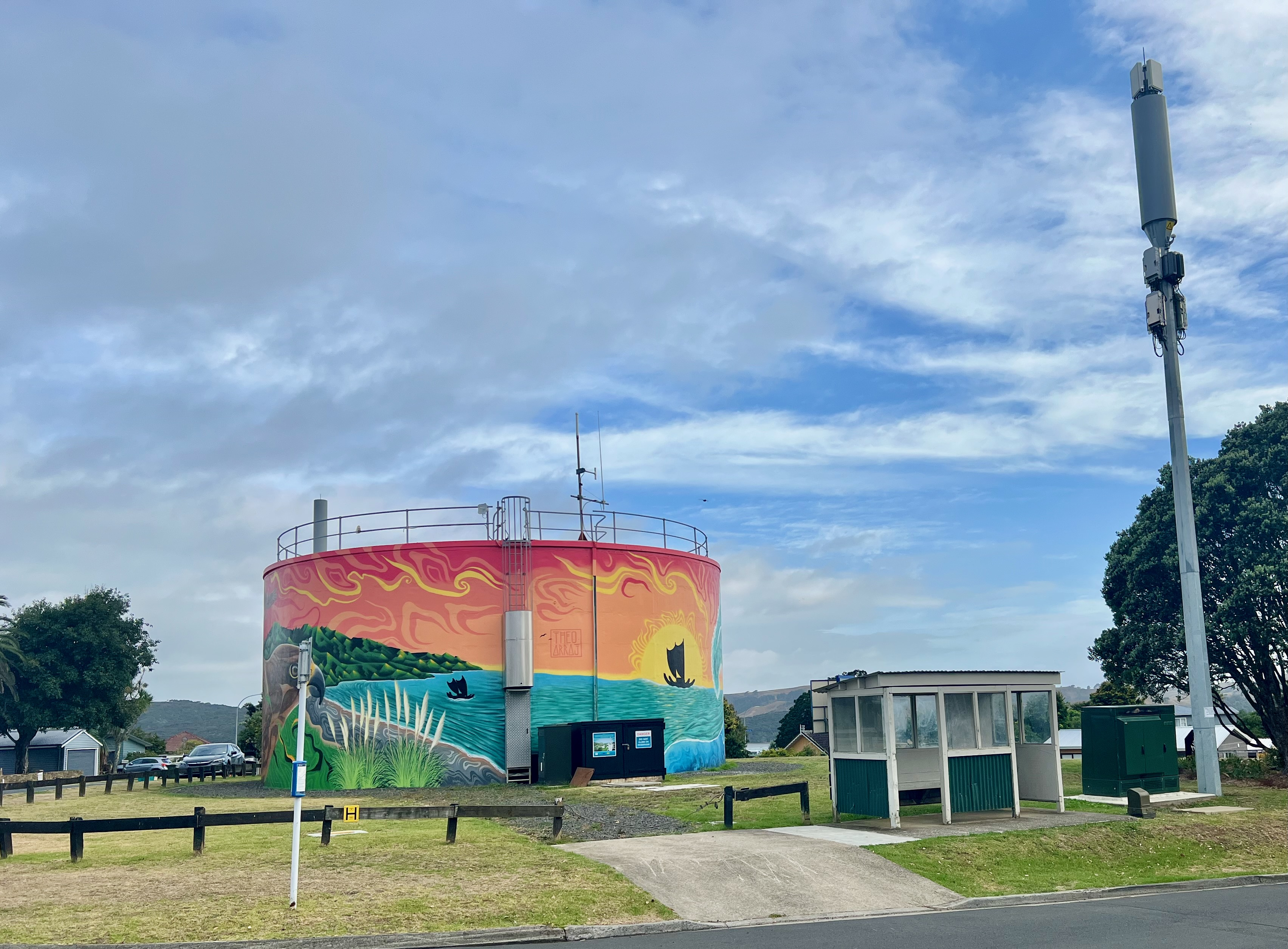
This is the second, next to Norrie Avenue bus shelter and 5G towers

In 1938 the Council said the annual cost of a loan would be £700 for an estimated total cost of £10,000. Another sewage and water scheme was considered in 1949, but still the cost of a loan was too high. Despite pollution, the Rose St bore was connected to the low areas of town and the camping ground. Council put in a new pump, but it could only pump 24,000 imp gal (110 m^{3})/day, so in the 1959 a bore was drilled at Warihi Park, but abandoned in 1962 due to problems with flow and gas in the water. A 1959 £100,000 estimate for Riki springs supply was still considered too expensive.

Finally, in 1961 Council got a £62,000 loan to bring water from Riki Springs, for a pump to lift water up the hill to tanks (another large reservoir was added in 1981), from where it ran by gravity to the top of Bow St. In October 1963, 4 weeks of dry weather resulted in council carting water to fill empty tanks. By Christmas 1963 household tanks were being filled by long hoses connected to the half-finished mains. On 8 July 1964, the first householders were invited to apply for a supply. There were problems with Christmas peak supplies and an upgrade was installed in 1972. In 1981 an extra reservoir was built in Cornwall Rd quarry.

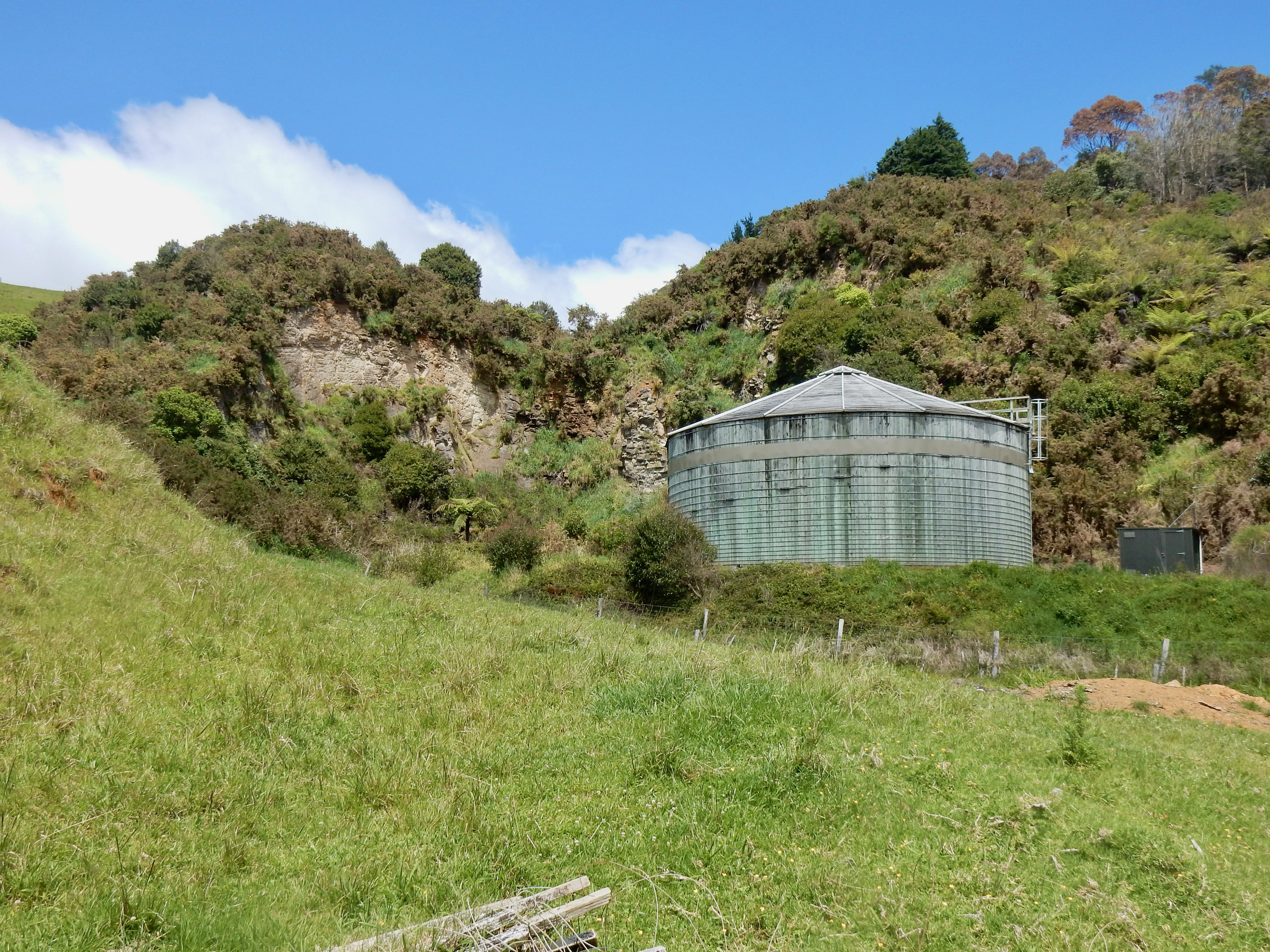
This is the third on Cornwall Road

In the late 1980s, the Community Arts Council got a mural painted on the water tower. It was restored in 2015 and repainted in 2024.

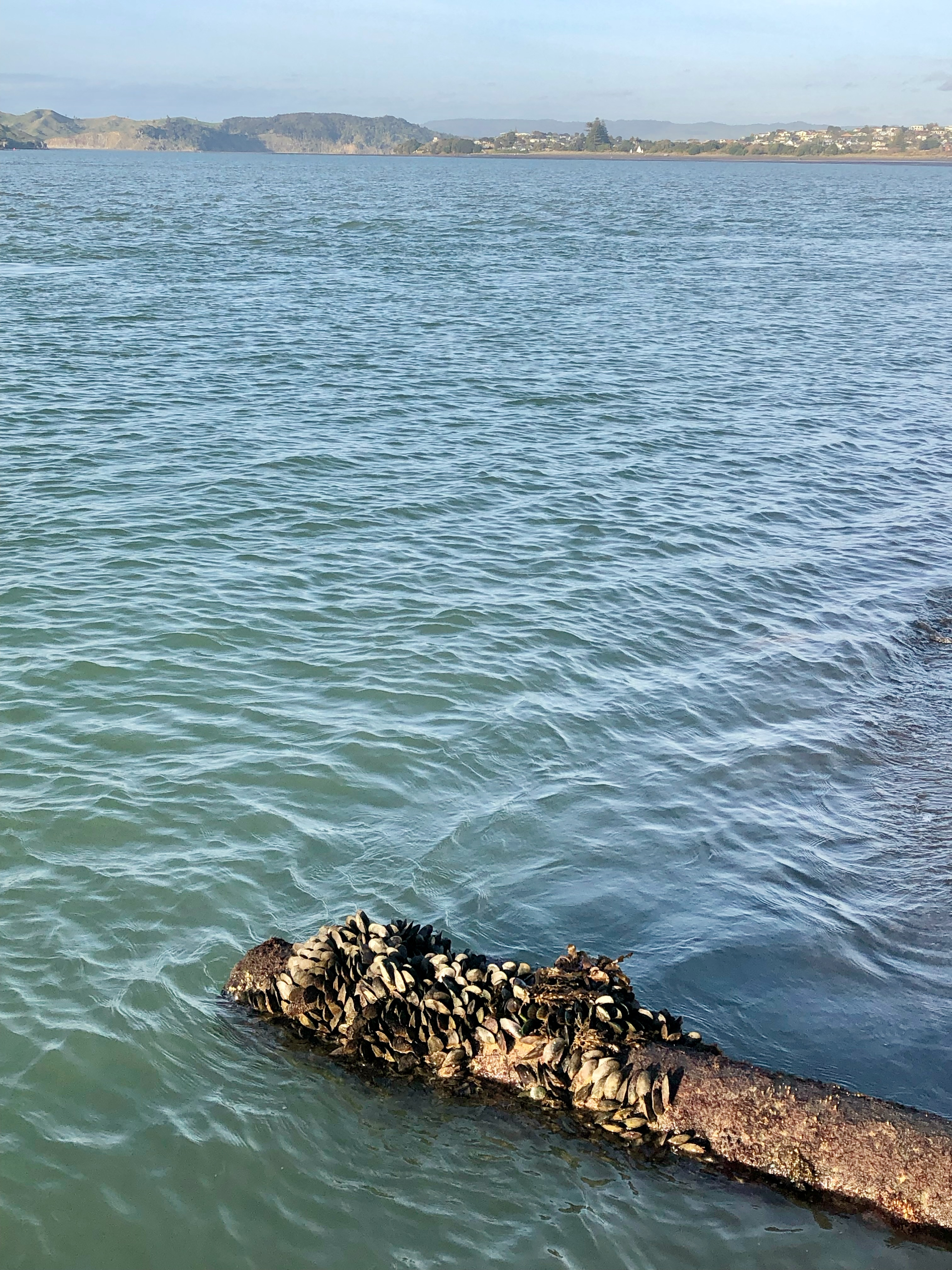
The outfall pipe for treated sewage is visible on very low tides

== Sewage ==
Since 1976 sewage from the town has been pumped to a treatment works to the west, with the treated effluent pumped, mainly on outgoing tides, into the mouth of the harbour. Ultra violet treatment was added in 2008 and aquamats (high surface–area polymer filters) and other upgrades in 2017, but the resource consent conditions for total suspended solids and faecal coliforms were still being breached. A proposal to use subsurface drip field irrigation, rather than disposal to sea was considered, before application was made for a resource consent to discharge into a valley on Wainui Reserve. A membrane bioreactor and membrane aerated biofilm reactor upgraded system opened in August 2025.

== Notable people ==
- Angeline Greensill (born 1948), Māori political rights campaigner and academic
- Anna Coddington, contemporary musician
- Antonio Te Maioha (born 1970), actor
- Dave Currie (born 1945), sports administrator
- Joan Fear (1932–2022), painter
- Hallyburton Johnstone (1897–1970), MP and farmer
- David Pretty (1878–1947), champion axeman and athlete
- Edward Puttick (1890–1976), retired soldier
- Eva Rickard (1925–1997), Māori rights campaigner
- Cort and Annie Jane Schnackenberg, 1860s–1870s missionaries
- Jordan Riki (2000–2017), Brisbane Broncos, Māori All Stars

== See also ==
- Raglan Chronicle, local newspaper
- List of radio stations in Waikato
- Hauauru ma raki formerly proposed windfarm
- Surf Life Saving Northern Region
- Strawberry Fields Music Festival, held at venues around Raglan in the 1990s and until the early 2000s (decade).
- Raglan Harbour Board Empowering Act
- Futuro, fibreglass "spaceship" house (moved to Christchurch in 2015)
