= Raglan Chronicle =

Free newspaper in New Zealand

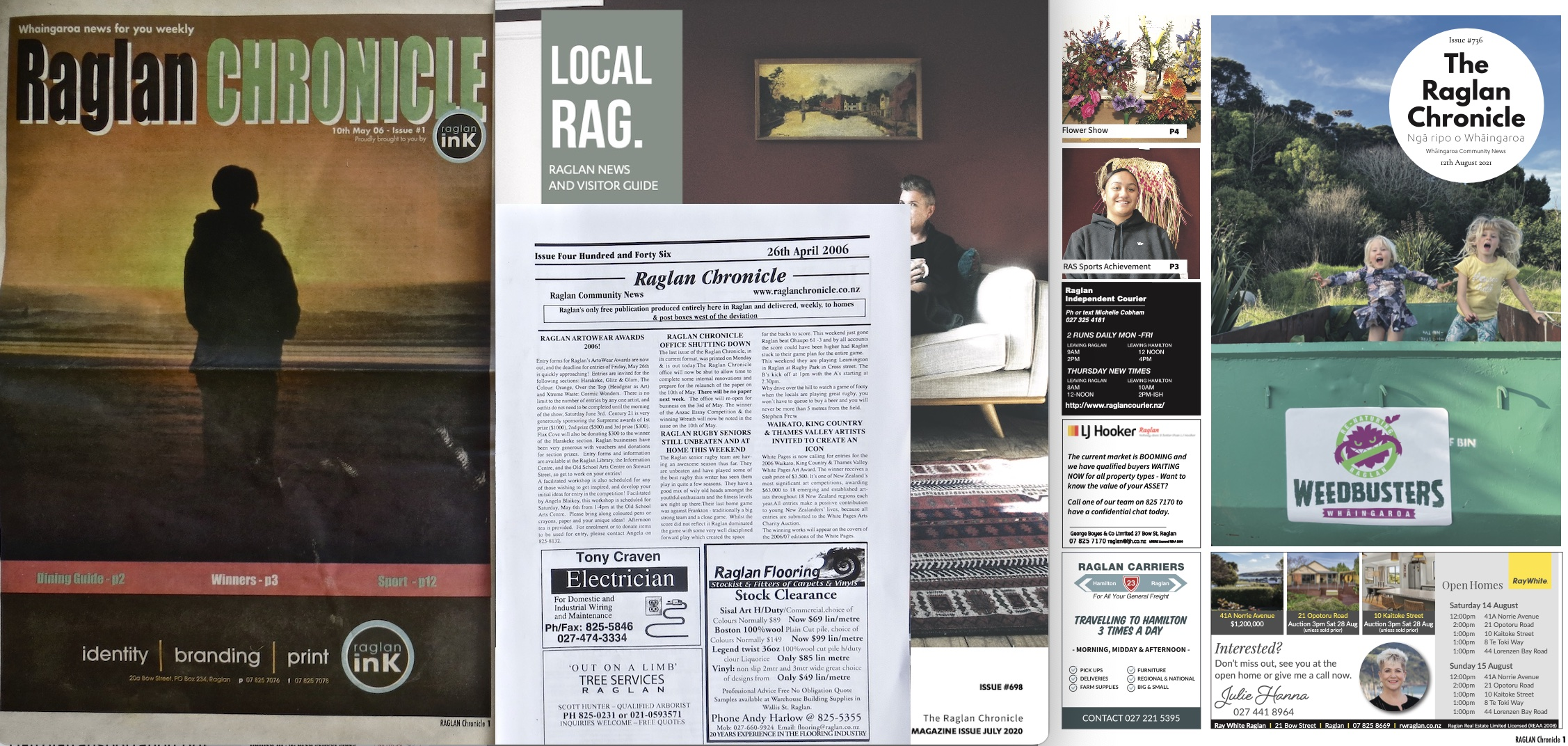
- The last A4 edition was in April, and the first tabloid, in May 2006.
- Type: Weekly newspaper
- Format: Tabloid
- Owner: Raglan Ink Ltd
- Editor: Maki Nishiyama
- Founded: 1903
- Headquarters: Raglan, Waikato region
- Circulation: about 3,000

The Raglan Chronicle, formerly the Raglan County Chronicle, is a free fortnightly newspaper published in Raglan, New Zealand, and delivered to most homes west of the summit of State Highway 23. Circulation figures are not published, but the 2013 Census showed 1,143 dwellings in Raglan and 681 in Te Uku area units, in addition to which copies are available in Raglan shops and cafes. In 2017 circulation was estimated at 3,000 copies a week. Copies can also be downloaded from the website.

== History ==
This is how the history of the Chronicle was presented in the 1940 Centennial Souvenir Booklet -

"In 1903 an event took place which did much for the progress of our district. This was no less than the formation of the Raglan Printing and Publishing Coy., which had for its object the inauguration of a weekly local paper. The first editor was Mr. F. W. Green under whose able management a wide and flourishing circulation was achieved and the venture paid a good dividend to its shareholders. In those days when the only telephones were those in the post offices local news travelled very slowly and often came to residents through the medium only of the Auckland Weekly News, Waikato Times, Waikato Argus or notices at post office or public notice boards, one of which was situated at the Kauroa-Okete cross-roads. Now all this was changed and a paper devoted solely to Raglan news and interests was a great boon and was eagerly looked forward to each week. In every home there was a rush for the Chronicle or "The Buster" as it was affectionately called by many."

=== 1903-13 ===
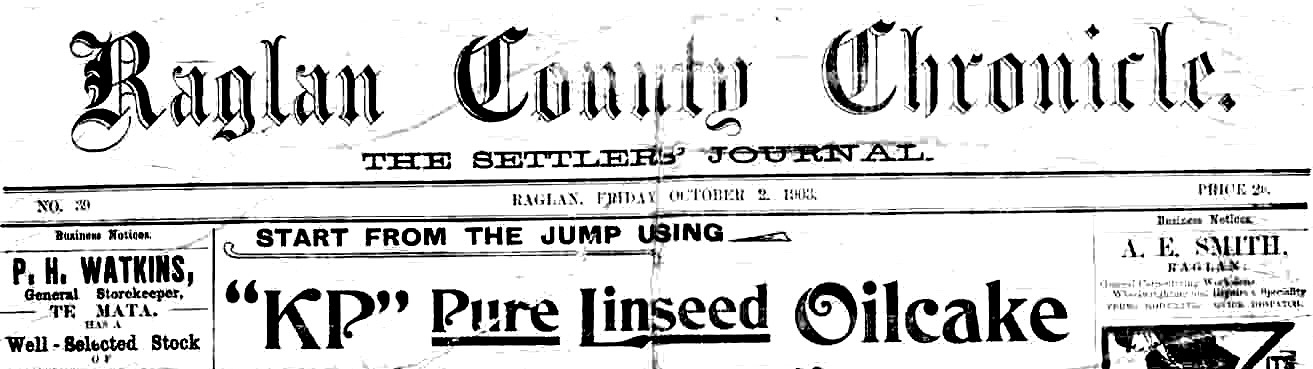
1903 Raglan County Chronicle

A Te Mata farmer, Frank W. Green was the first editor and ran the Raglan County Chronicle for over 10 years. He was also on the Raglan Town Board when it was formed in 1906, resigning in 1907, to become its first Town Clerk. In 1913 Frank left the district and passed the Chronicle to Roy Donaldson for the rest of the year.

=== 1913-19 ===
The Rev. Greenwell Carr then became proprietor and editor. He was Congregational Church minister from 1898 to 1917, came from Denniston and spoke with a broad North Country accent. Increasing deafness caused him to resign from the ministry, though he continued to take services when other ministers were not available. From 1913 until 1938 he too was Town Clerk and from 1915 to 1920 he was secretary of the Raglan Dairy Co.

Gerald Griffiths who was farming at Kauroa took over the Chronicle after returning from the war, about 1919.

=== 1920-35 ===
Dr W.M. Sanders and his wife ran the Chronicle for about 15 years and lived in a house behind the Bow St office. He had been a schoolteacher in Taranaki, before training as a doctor and became Raglan's first doctor. On 15 February 1906, Raglan ratepayers, with Dr. W. M. Sanders in the chair, decided set up a committee to map out a township area get a petition to form Raglan Town Board. Dr Sanders was one of 5 elected unopposed. The Board met at the Chronicle office until the Town Hall was built. Dr Sanders was master of the Masonic lodge in 1912. In 1913 Dr Stewart Moore took over the practice, whilst Dr Sanders moved to Frankton and then to Tonga. In 1916 Dr Sanders returned to Raglan, but sold the practice to Dr. Cashmore in the early 20s. Dr Sanders‚ last home was on the hill, surrounded by a garden and orchard, fronting James and Bow Streets. St Peters church is built on land donated by Dr Sanders in 1922. Then Jack Eggelston and later Mr. Keay and his son Winton managed the business. In 1927 the original office, next to the Town Hall, was burnt down, together with the hall and a draper's shop. It was rebuilt across the road. For the years 1936-38 Ron Pearce managed it for the Sanders Estate.

=== 1938-44 ===
The Chronicle was then sold to C.H. Marcroft. The Centennial Booklet said, "Mr. C. H. Marcroft, came to the rescue and has succeeded in again making the paper the medium of interest and progress it was meant to be when it was started so enthusiastically 37 years ago." He moved to Tauranga in 1944.

=== 1944-59 ===
Ron Pearce, who had managed the Chronicle in the mid 30s, bought the business in 1944. He sold it to Ian Thomson in 1950, but in 1952 Ian had a serious car accident and Ron took over and ran it again until 1959. Ron was master of the Masonic lodge in 1956.

=== 1959-63 ===
Bill Racke was the last editor, ceasing publication on 24 April 1963. In 1963 a few copies of the Raglan Rally came out.

In 1967 the disused Chronicle Office building was purchased for a Jehovah's Witnesses meeting place. The casements were removed and a brick front built. It has since seen several uses and became Raglan Gym in 2011.

=== 1988-97 ===
In the late 1980s, under the influence of Eva Rickard, Whaingaroa Kite Whenua Trust, as part of its training for unemployed youth, ran an Office Skills training module and a Graphics Arts programme. Mike Bell was their literacy and numeracy tutor and assisted students to develop and conduct a survey asking Raglan residents about community needs. Most clearly identified was the need for a local newspaper. The Graphic Arts students under Maurizio Sarsini began producing the Karioi Journal for the rest of the students to read. Shortly after this in August 1988, Mike together with Jacqui Keelan who also worked for the Trust, borrowed $10,000 to purchase a printer and initiated the creation and publication of the first edition of the Raglan New Chronicle. Mike continued to edit and grow the publication over the following eight years. Delivery was by volunteers. Publication and editing was passed on to the Brownlees in 1996.

=== 1997-Present ===
In 1997 Stephen and Tracy Frew took over and, in April 2004, the Chronicle once again got an office on Bow St in the former petrol station shop and dropped the 'New' title. Another new development was the web site, so that the paper was regularly read in UK, US and Australia.

April 2006 saw further change, as David and Jacqui Smith became editors and the Chronicle appeared for the first time in colour and reverted to tabloid format (see photo above). In September 2007 the Chronicle office moved to 2 Wainui Rd (see street scene on Google Maps). The paper moved upstairs, next door, in October 2016. After 9 July 2020 the paper changed from weekly publication to fortnightly, plus a monthly magazine, Local Rag, attributing the change to the impact of the COVID pandemic. From 12 August 2021 the masthead was changed, with the subtitle "Ngā ripo o Whaingaroa - Whāingaroa Community News" added. In 2022 the Chronicle moved to share an office with the information centre, Raglan iHub, which reopened in 2021 after losing its council funding.
