= David Pretty (bushman) =

New Zealand bushman, axeman, athlete and farmer

David Pretty (1878–1947) was a New Zealand bushman, axeman, athlete and farmer. He was born in Okete, Waikato, New Zealand in 1878.
