= List of localities in Waikato =

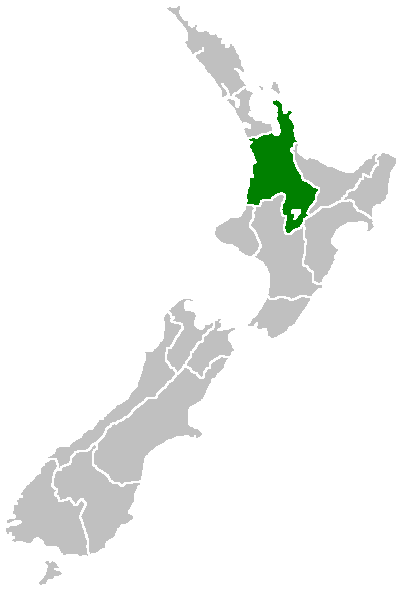
Waikato Region

This is a list of localities in Waikato as defined by government agency Statistics New Zealand in 2013, listed by the territorial authorities to which each locality belongs. Waikato is a region of New Zealand in the central North Island which reaches from coast to coast and from Coromandel Peninsula in the north to Lake Taupō and King Country in the south. Many boundaries and names were changed in the 2018 census. It is bordered by Auckland to the north, Bay of Plenty to the east, and Taranaki, Manawatū-Whanganui and Hawke's Bay to the south.

== Thames-Coromandel District ==
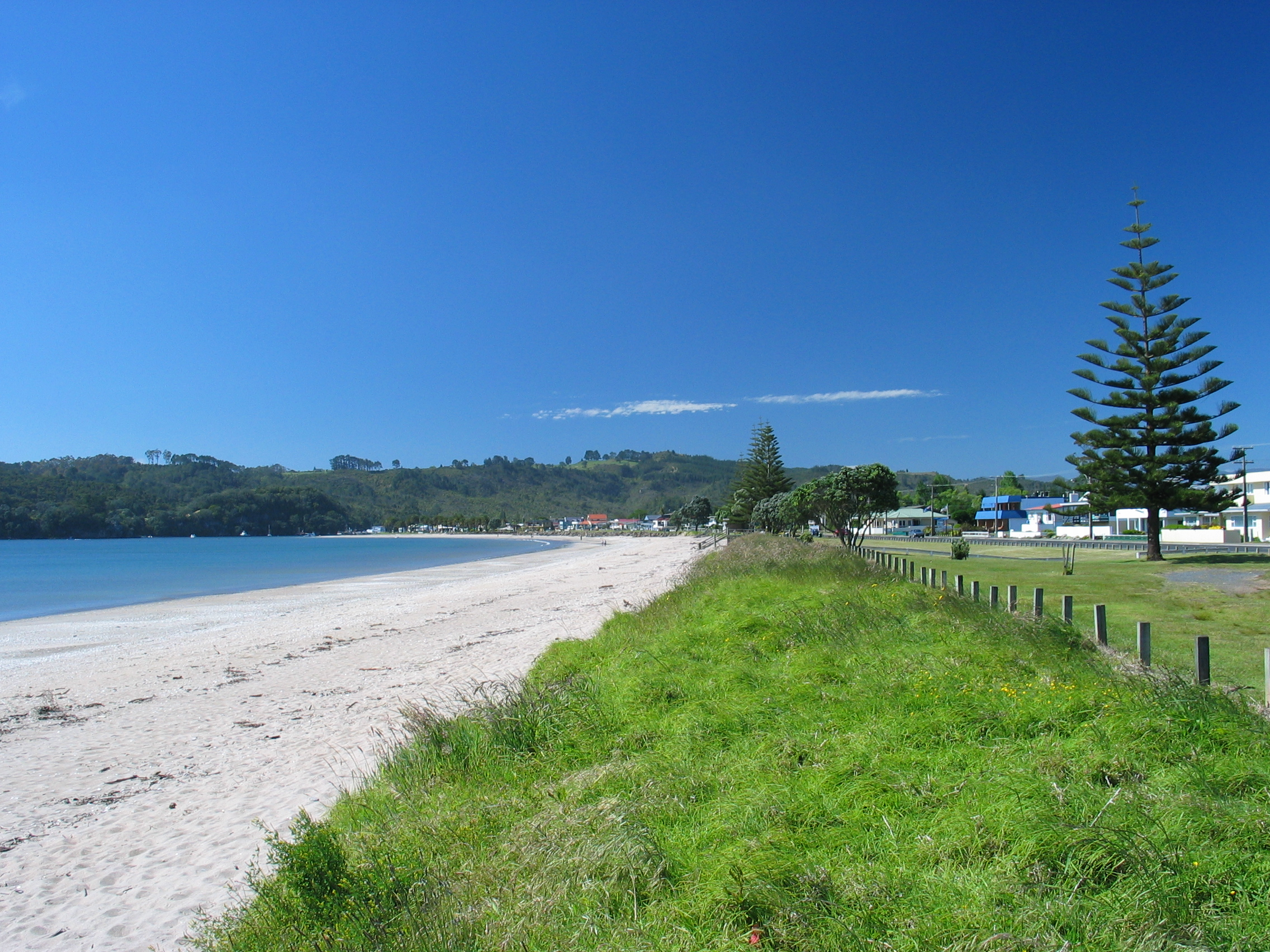
Whitianga

The Thames-Coromandel District is located in the area around the Firth of Thames and Coromandel Peninsula, to the southeast of Auckland. At the 2006 Census, Thames-Coromandel had 25,941 people (including 4,020 self-identified Māori) and 22,704 occupied dwellings. The district council is seated in the district's largest town, Thames, and was constituted before any other district council in 1975. Thames is located in the southwest of the district; the other major settlements are Whitianga in the northeast and Whangamatā in the southeast.

Locality	Population	Occupied Dwellings
Whitianga	3,768 (2006)	1,674 (2006)
Coromandel	1,473 (2006)	642 (2006)
Te Rerenga	4,173 (2006)	1,896 (2006)
Whangamatā	3,555 (2006)	1,701 (2006)
Tairua	1,269 (2006)	603 (2006)
Moanataiari (northern area of Thames)	2,472 (2006)	1,146 (2006)
Parawai (southern area of Thames)	4,284 (2006)	1,734 (2006)
Pauanui Beach	750 (2013)	399 (2013 - 1,749 unoccupied)
Hikuai	3,252 (2006)	1,314 (2013)
Te Puru-Thornton Bay	942 (2006)	426 (2006)
Inlets-Thames-Coromandel District	n/a	n/a
Islands-Thames-Coromandel District	12 (2006)	n/a

== Hauraki District ==
Locality	Population	Occupied Dwellings	Features and Facilities
Ngatea	1,245	531 (2013)	
Hauraki Plains	2,508	930 (2013)	
Turua	1,317	483 (2013)	
Kerepehi	429	162 (2013)	
Ohinemuri	3,111	1,278 (2013)	includes Karangahake Gorge, Waikino and Whiritoa
Paeroa	3,885	1,647 (2013)	
Waihi	4,527	2,001 (2013)	

== Waikato District ==
Locality	2013 Population	2013 Occupied Dwellings	Features and Facilities
Buckland	846	294	
Redoubt	198	72	south west of Tuakau
Opuawhanga	234	81	south east of Tuakau
Pōkeno	1,782	615	
Mangatāwhiri	1,533	543	
Otaua	2,268	810	see Awaroa River, Maioro, Parkinsons Lake and Karioitahi Beach
Tuakau	4,185	1,443	
Onewhero	3,381	1,401	
Rotowaro	0	0	
Raglan	2,736	1,143	
Waikato Western Hills	3,978	1,437	Waikato Western Hills is a New Zealand census area unit covering a large low population area within Waikato District. It includes the localities of Rotongaro, Ruawaro, Renown, Mahuta, Glen Afton, Glen Massey, Waingaro, Ohautira, Waitetuna, Glen Tui and Karakariki.
Te Uku	1,896	681	Area unit includes Te Mata, Ruapuke and the north side of Aotea Harbour.
Te Ākau	930	348	
Te Kauwhata	1,473	552	
Matangi	2,157	735	
Whitikahu	2,115	708	
Taupiri	417	162	
Eureka	2,187	750	includes Tauwhare and Waitakaruru Stream
Gordonton	1,137	342	
Tauwhare			see Tamahere
Kainui	2,766	942	includes Hopuhopu
Tamahere	5,628	1,875	
Waerenga	2,538	666	
Maramarua	1,011	372	
Meremere	468	150	
Huntly West	2,835	906	see Huntly
Huntly East	4,119	1,539	see Huntly
Horotiu	771	279	
Te Kowhai	1,512	549	
Whatawhata	2,475	831	
Ngāruawāhia	5,127	1,719	
Inlet-Raglan Harbour	0	0	
Inlet-Aotea Harbour North	0	0	

== Matamata-Piako District ==
Locality	2013 Population	2013 Occupied Dwellings	Features and Facilities
Tahuroa	2,652	948	includes Mangateparu
Waitoa	306	120	
Springdale	2,454	891	
Waihou-Walton	3,999	1,470	includes Walton
Te Aroha	3,906	1,662	
Morrinsville West	2,562	978	
Morrinsville East	4,431	1,773	
Waharoa	465	147	
Okauia	1,965	723	
Te Poi	801	285	
Hinuera	906	336	
Matamata North	2,928	1,260	
Matamata South	4,164	1,656	

== Hamilton City ==
Locality	Population	Occupied Dwellings	Features and Facilities
Sylvester			
Flagstaff			
Horsham Downs			
Rototuna			
Huntington			
Peacocke			
Temple View			
Bryant			
Pukete			
Pukete West			
Te Rapa			
Burbush			in 2018 it became part of Rotokauri-Waiwhakareke
Rotokauri			
Nawton			
Crawshaw			
Grandview			
Brymer			in 2018 divided between Nawton West and Western Heights
Dinsdale North			see Dinsdale
Dinsdale South			see Dinsdale
Beerescourt			
Maeroa			
Frankton Junction			
Swarbrick			
Hamilton Lake			
Melville			
Glenview			
Queenwood			
Chedworth			
Porritt			
Insoll			
Fairview Downs			
Chartwell			
Hamilton Central			
Clarkin			
Claudelands			
Enderley			
Peachgrove			
Hamilton East			
Naylor			
Bader			
University			
Silverdale			
Hillcrest West			see Hillcrest
Riverlea			

== Waipa District ==
Locality	Population	Occupied Dwellings	Features and Facilities
Te Pahu	1,272	462	
Hautapu	1,914	639	
Swayne	1,461	438	north of Cambridge
Cambridge - North	3,006	1,137	
Cambridge - West	2,718	1,185	
Cambridge - Central	765	345	
Cambridge - Leamington West	3,528	1,341	
Cambridge - Leamington East	3,849	1,482	
Ōhaupō	519	186	
Kihikihi	1,974	726	
Ngāhinapōuri	2,106	735	
Lake Cameron	1,176	399	
Te Rore	420	156	see Paterangi
Pirongia	1,410	513	
Pokuru	528	186	see Kakepuku
Lake Ngaroto	564	201	
Tokanui	444	147	
Pukerimu	462	162	
Kaipaki	975	354	
Rotoorangi	1,935	682	
Te Rahu	900	330	Te Rahu Hall (Dec.2011)
Kihikihi Flat	798	291	see Rangiaowhia
Allen Road	204	72	
Rotongata	816	291	
Te Awamutu West	1,305	474	
Te Awamutu Central	3,321	1,368	
Te Awamutu East	2,769	1,107	
Te Awamutu South	2,913	1,176	
Karapiro	2,625	936	see also Karapiro Power Station, Maungakawa, Maungatautari and Piarere

== Ōtorohanga District ==
Locality	Population	Occupied Dwellings	Features and Facilities
Kawhia - Community	339	153	
Ōtorohanga - Town	2,514	1,005	
Ōtorohanga - Rural West	1,845	705	
Te Kawa	450	153	
Ōtorohanga - Rural East	3,993	1,287	
Te Motu Island	0	0	
Ōtorohanga District - Inlets	0	0	

== South Waikato District ==
Locality	Population	Occupied Dwellings	Features and Facilities
Tīrau	693	294	
Mangakaretu	231	87	see Tokoroa
Kinleith	237	90	
Tapapa	999	369	
Arapuni	2,190	816	
Lichfield	987	369	
Wawa	711	270	see Ātiamuri
Paraonui	1,725	684	see Tokoroa
Parkdale	666	255	see Tokoroa
Putāruru	3,777	1,515	
Matarawa	1,899	741	see Tokoroa
Stanley Park	2,034	771	see Tokoroa
Tokoroa Central	720	288	
Aotea	2,979	1,038	see Tokoroa
Strathmore	2,070	741	see Tokoroa
Amisfield	156	60	see Tokoroa

== Waitomo District ==
Locality	Population	Occupied Dwellings	Features and Facilities
Piopio	396	165	
Taharoa	231	84	
Māhoenui	402	162	see Awakino and Mokau
Marokopa	1,536	588	see Awamarino
Waipa Valley	1,050	372	see Benneydale
Mokauiti	1,026	390	
Te Kūiti	4,218	1,578	
Inlet-Waitomo District	0	0	

== Taupō District ==
Locality	Population	Occupied Dwellings	Features and Facilities
Kuratau	273	114	
Mangakino	741	312	
Tūrangi	2,995	1,173	
Acacia Bay	1,425	570	
Wairakei-Aratiatia	606	207	see Aratiatia Power Station and Wairakei
Maunganamu	411	150	
Taupō East	6	3	
Wharewaka	498	252	
Rangatira Park	696	291	
Rangatira	78	36	
Lakewood	1,425	594	
Marotiri	1,557	552	see Ātiamuri
Oruanui	2,268	822	
Kinloch	489	198	
Broadlands	639	213	see Iwitahi and Bruce McLaren Motorsport Park
Rangipo	99	30	
Nukuhau	1,509	606	
Taupō Central	3,573	1,479	
Tauhara	4,113	1,566	
Hilltop	3,540	1,422	
Waipahihi	1,881	762	
Richmond Heights	2,103	783	
Inland Water - Lake Taupō	0	0	

== Rotorua District ==
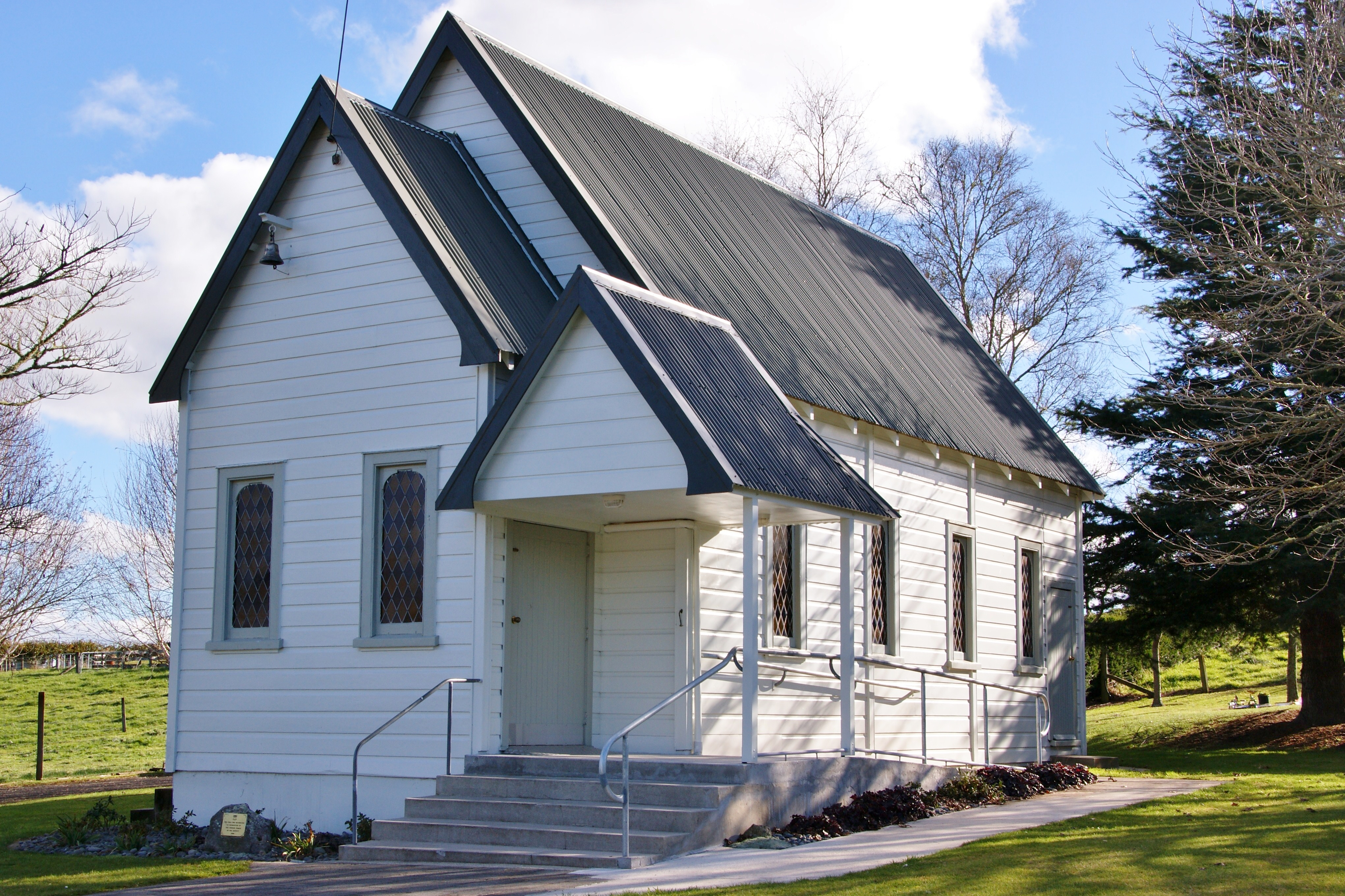
Christ's Church, Ngakuru

Locality	Population	Occupied Dwellings	Features and Facilities
Golden Springs	1,344	468	
Reporoa	450	162	
Ngakuru	1,695	606	
Arahiwi	177	54	

== Area outside territorial authority ==
Locality	Population	Occupied Dwellings	Features and Facilities
Inlet - Firth of Thames			
Oceanic-Waikato Region West			
Bays-Thames-Coromandel District			
Oceanic-Waikato Region East			
