= Clarkin =

Clarkin is a surname. Notable people with the surname include:

- Andrew Clarkin (1891–1955), Irish politician
- Ian Clarkin (born 1995), American baseball player
- John Clarkin (1872–?), Scottish footballer
- John Paul Clarkin (born 1978), New Zealand polo player
- Lucy Gertrude Clarkin (1876–1947), Canadian poet
- Matthew Clarkin (born 1981), British-born New Zealand rugby union player
- Nina Clarkin, British polo player
- Paul Clarkin (1950–2004), New Zealand polo player
- Richard Clarkin, Canadian actor
- Tony Clarkin (1946–2024), British musician and record producer
- Tony Clarkin (actor) (born 1952), Irish actor
