= Glen Massey =

- Village
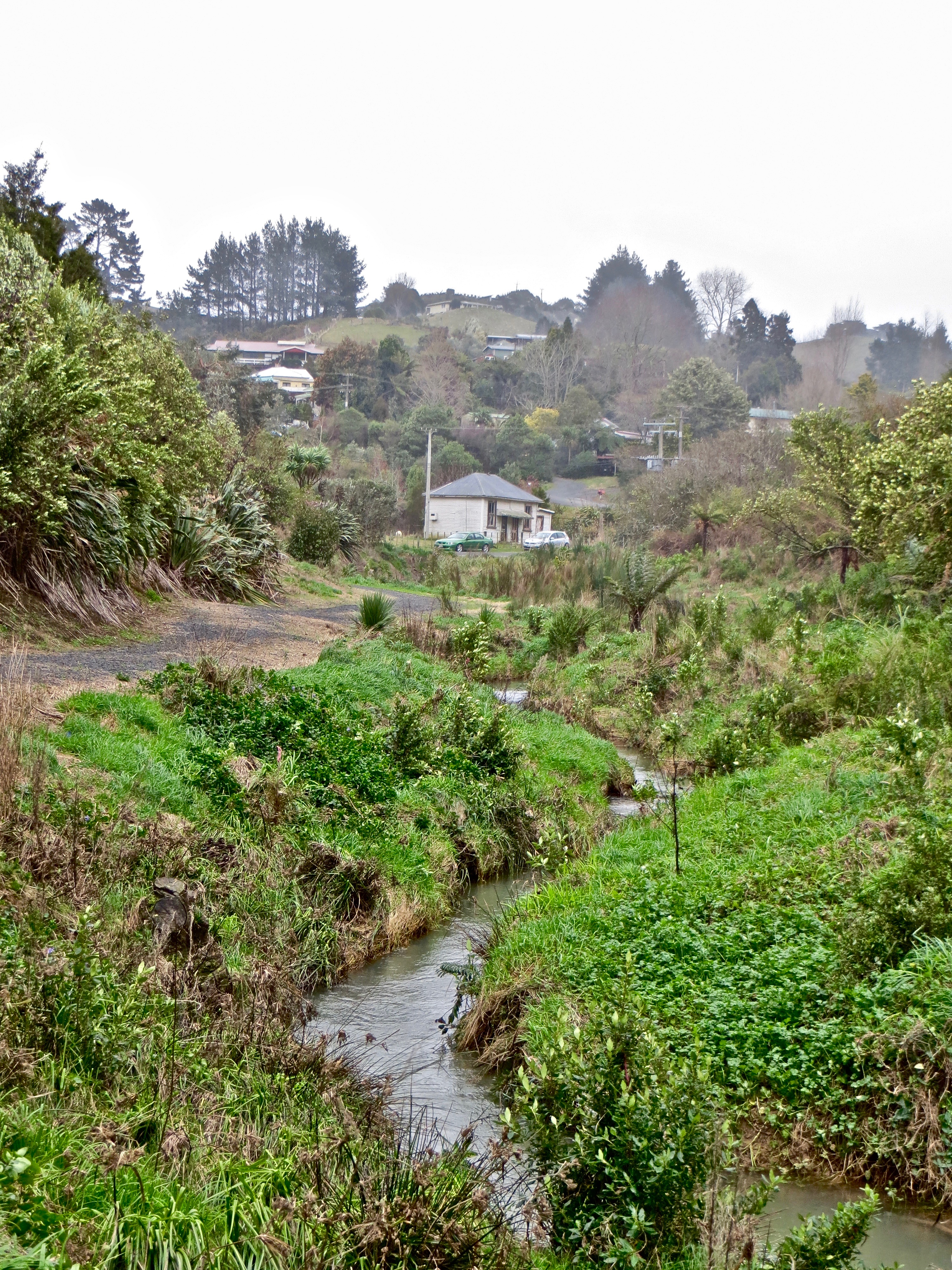
- Stream, former rail track and former medical centre in 2014
- Interactive map of Glen Massey
- Coordinates: 37°40′20″S 175°04′23″E
- Country: New Zealand
- Region: Waikato region
- District: Waikato District
- Wards: Western Districts General Ward; Tai Runga Takiwaa Maaori Ward
- Electorates: Taranaki-King Country; Hauraki-Waikato (Māori)

Government
  - Territorial Authority: Waikato District Council
  - Regional council: Waikato Regional Council
  - Mayor of Waikato: Aksel Bech
  - Taranaki-King Country MP: Barbara Kuriger
  - Hauraki-Waikato MP: Hana-Rawhiti Maipi-Clarke

Area
  - Territorial: 89.00 km^{2} (34.36 sq mi)
- Elevation: 100 m (330 ft)

Population (2023 census)
  - Territorial: 474
  - Density: 5.33/km^{2} (13.8/sq mi)
- Time zone: UTC+12 (NZST)
  - Summer (DST): UTC+13 (NZDT)

Glen Massey is a former mining village, 9.5 km (5.9 mi) west of Ngāruawāhia, which was, until 1958, terminus of the Glen Massey Line. It then went into decline, but is now becoming a home for Hamilton commuters.

== Name ==
There is no official name. Various names appeared on maps and in reports of the area.

Mangahoa is the only name in the area shown on an 1859 map, probably applying to what was later called the Mangaohe Stream, called Mangaohei in an 1867 report, and used on maps up to 1966, but officially named Firewood Creek in 1976. As early as 1909 a report referred to Firewood Creek.

Kupa Kupa was the name used at the 1860s compensation hearings for the 9,280 acres (3,760 ha) area north of Te Awa o te Atua (River of God - now Firewood Creek), and stretching to what is now Huntly, as it included the former village of that name near Huntly.

Te Akatea (translates to white rata, which was plentiful) village settlement of 22 settlers was formed in 1887, spread along much of the route between Ngāruawāhia and Waingaro. The name is still retained by a hamlet about 4 km (2.5 mi) north of what is now Glen Massey.

Glen Massey seems to have first appeared in 1914. One source asserts there was a large Scottish population in the area, the name ‘Glen’ means ‘valley’, and the name ‘Massey’ honoured the Prime Minister, William Massey, elected in 1912.

== Geology ==
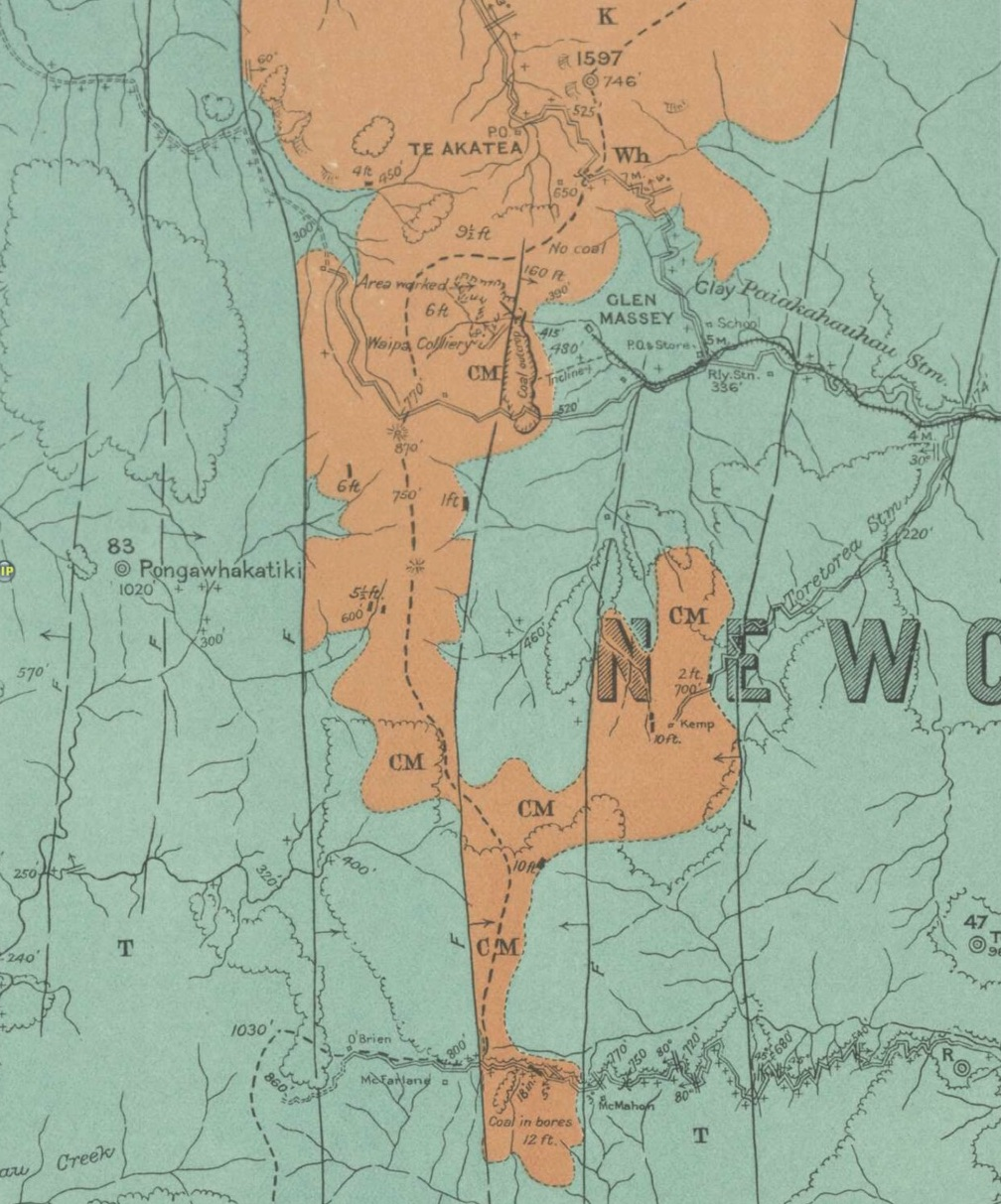
1925 geological map - CM coal measures, K Te Kuiti beds, L Triassic, T Jurassic, Wh Whaingaroa beds

The geology of Glen Massey accounts for its rise and fall as a former coal mining centre.

The 1925 map below shows a simple layout. Since then, maps of 1966 and 2005 have differentiated more strata, as in this list, starting with the oldest rocks -

Triassic (L on the map - 250-200mya), in the Newcastle Formation. They are -

- Hakarimata Formation of indurated siltstones and tuffaceous sandstones, with other siltstones and conglomerates,
- Marakopa Formation, containing intraformational slump structures and shell-beds.

Jurassic (T - 200-145mya)

- Te Pake Sandstone, with plant fragments,
- Pongawhakatiki Siltstone of Ururoan age, another indurated rock.

Eocene (CM - 33-27mya) Waikato coal measures (see next section).

Oligocene (K - late Whaingaroan - 30mya) Glen Massey Formation, named after this locality -

- Elgood Limestone (with up to 95% CaCO_{3}), hard flaggy, grey calcareous
- Dunphail Siltstone (outcropping in Dunphail Bluffs, with up to 60% CaCO_{3})
- Ahirau Sandstone bluffs (with 40-60% CaCO_{3}).

The Late Pliocene to Middle Quaternary (3.6-0.8mya) in the lowlands -

- Walton Subgroup of pumiceous fine-grained sand and silt with interbedded peat, pumiceous gravelly sand, diatomaceous mud, and non-welded ignimbrite and tephra.

The Late Pleistocene (0.13-0.012mya) also in the valleys -

- Hinuera formation of sand and gravel, interbedded with silt and some peat.

=== Coal mining ===
Although the Kupakupa, Renown and Kemps Seams are all present, only Kupakupa has been worked to any extent. Kupakupa Seam reserves are estimated at less than 40 000 tonnes, although 2m tonnes may be concealed under the northern area, and over 1m in 'sub-economic' seams of the old Waipa Colliery.

The beds are in a graben and dip gently N or NW. Major faults strike N or NNW and minor faults NE.

Glen Massey's coal was known of by 1867, when it was suggested a tramway should be built down the Mangaohei valley. However, seams closer to river transport were available, so no significant exploitation began until 1907.

Between 1914 and 1977 about 3.5m tonnes of coal were dug in the Glen Massey coalfield, as follows -

Open	Close	Colliery	Type	Tons
1914	1930	Waipa	mine	1,071,346
1930	1958	Wilton	mine	2,033,232
1944	1949	Kemps	open	239,340
1948	1948	Heworth	mine	505
1949	1950	Hillcrest	mine	54,073
1952	1961	Hunters	mine	6,794
1952	1952	Dunphail	open	945
1962	1969	Hughes	mine	40,412
1967	1968	Hughes	open	2,468
1970	1973	McDougall 1	open	9,853
1972	1973	McDougall 2	open	15,433
1973	1974	McDougall 3	open	6,998
1974	1977	McDougall 4	open	5,552

A 1976 estimate said 30,000 tons might remain in the coalfield, but a 1984 report suggested it was too deep for economic opencasting.

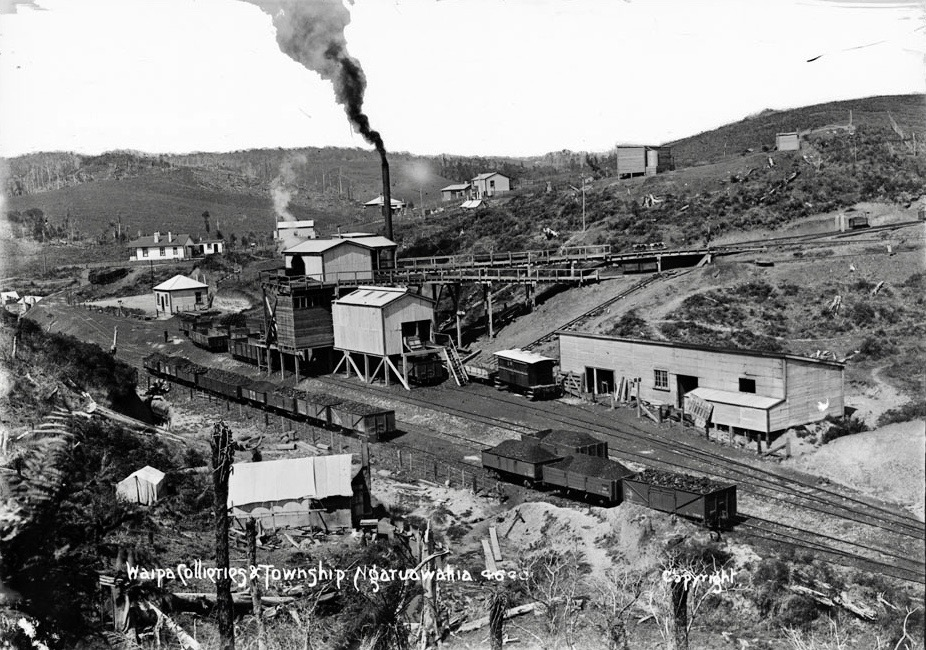
Waipa Colliery about 1917

==== Waipa Colliery ====
In 1907 a request was made to transport coal by motor vehicle and, in 1908, the Ngaruawahia Dairy Association took 3 tons of coal a week from the seams that were to become Waipa Colliery, during a strike at Huntly mines. A start was made on a tramway in 1908, soon described as a light railway for the Co-operative Coal Co Ltd, set up by 3 farmers, soon renamed Ngaruawahia Coal Co Ltd. and merged into Waipa Railway and Collieries Ltd. An adit into an 11 ft (3.4 m) seam had been started by 1911.

=== Clay ===
The China Clay and Porcelain Co Ltd was formed in 1924 to export china clay and make bricks, tiles and bathroom-ware. It probably only made bricks in any quantity. It went into voluntary liquidation in April 1930.

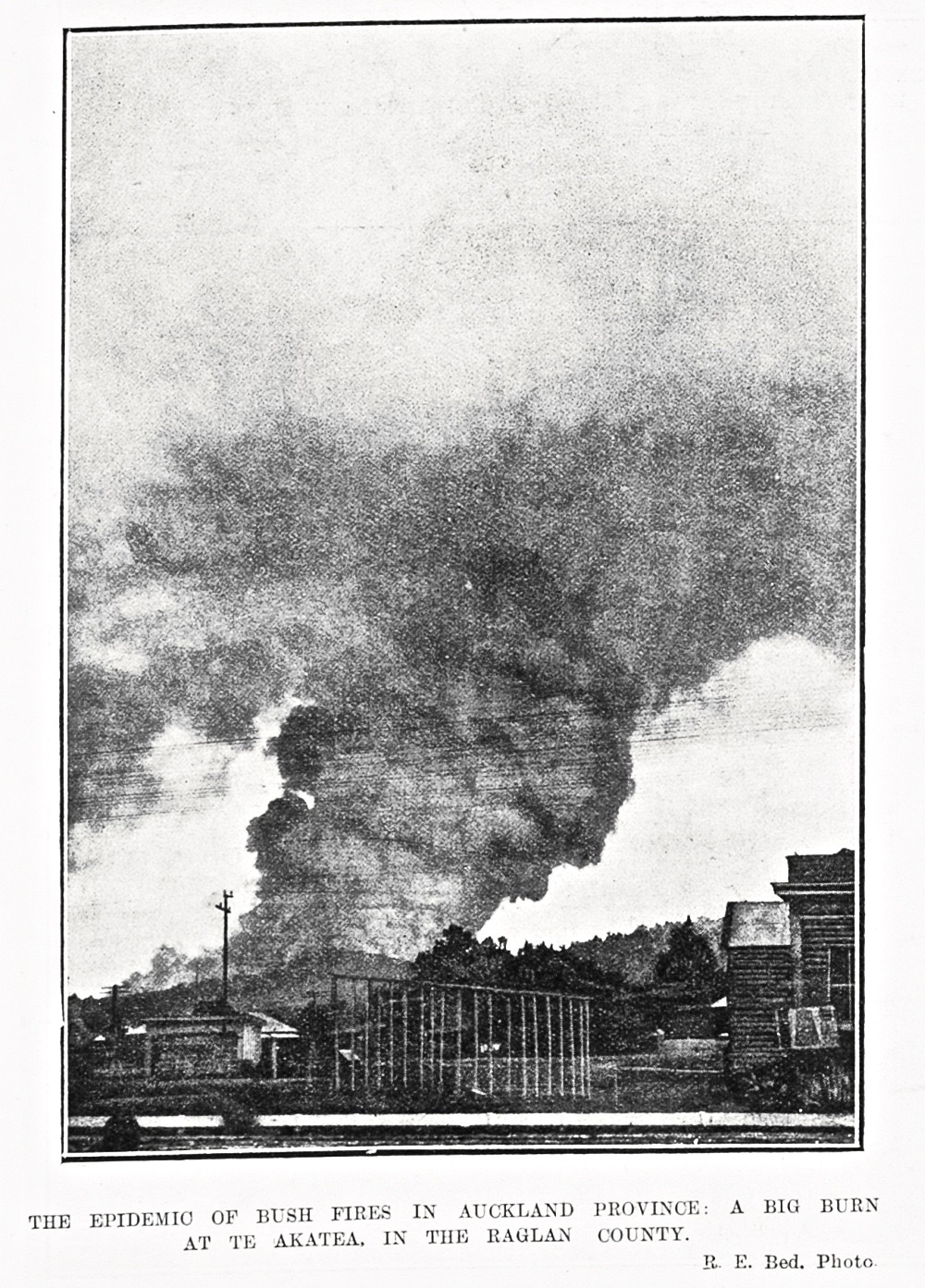
Te Akatea bushfire in 1911

== History ==
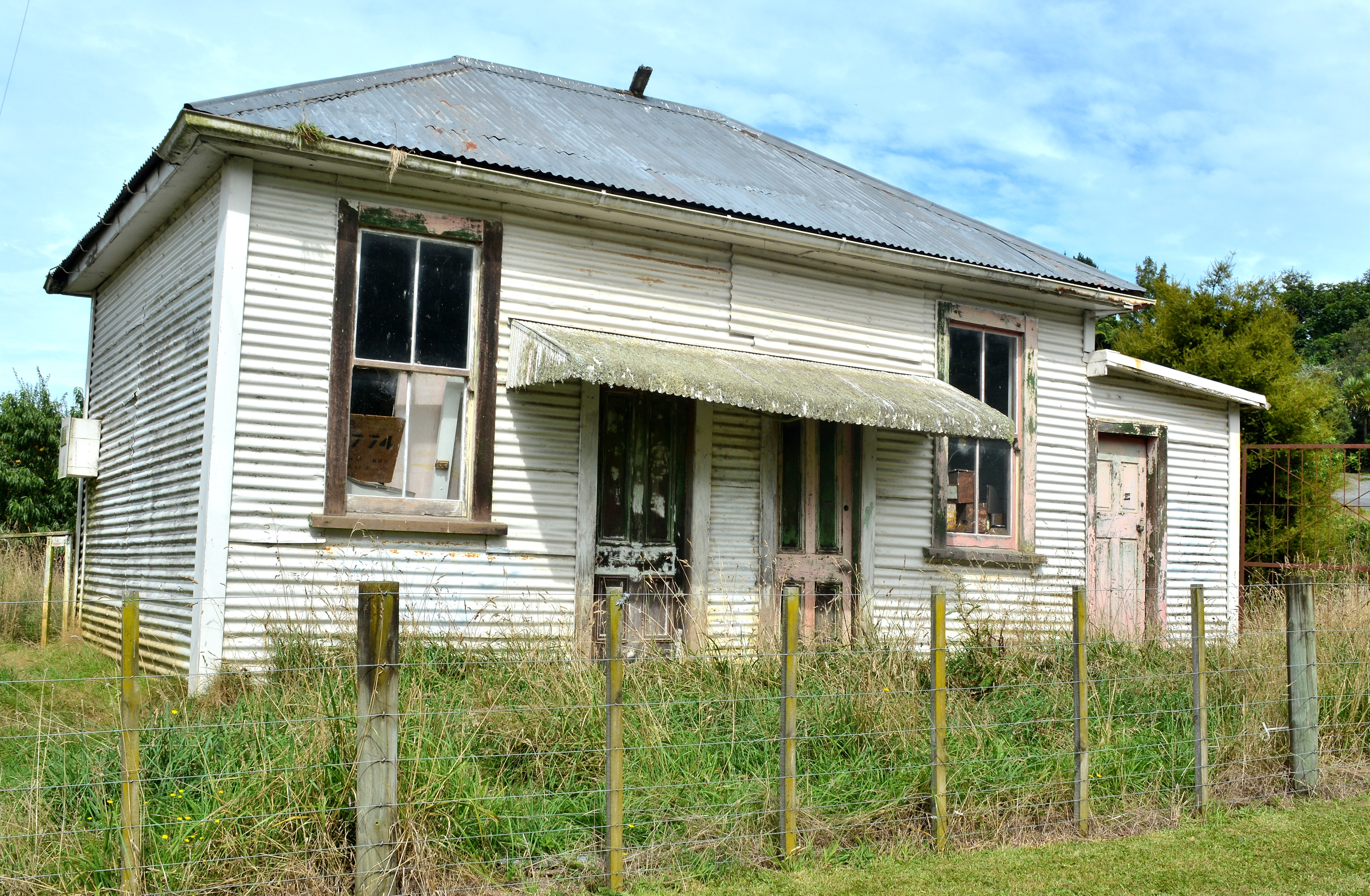
Former Medical Centre

The archaeology map shows no sites between Ngāruawāhia and Waingaro, though many stone axe heads were found on nearby Te Akatea farm, which was largely bush until it was burnt after 1905. Therefore, it's likely the area was largely bush until the arrival of the first settlers, being used by the surrounding populations for food and clothing, including birds, bracken, karaka, hinau, nīkau, kahikatea, raupo, kiekie; flax, dyes from muds, bark, or berries and oils from seeds such as titoki.

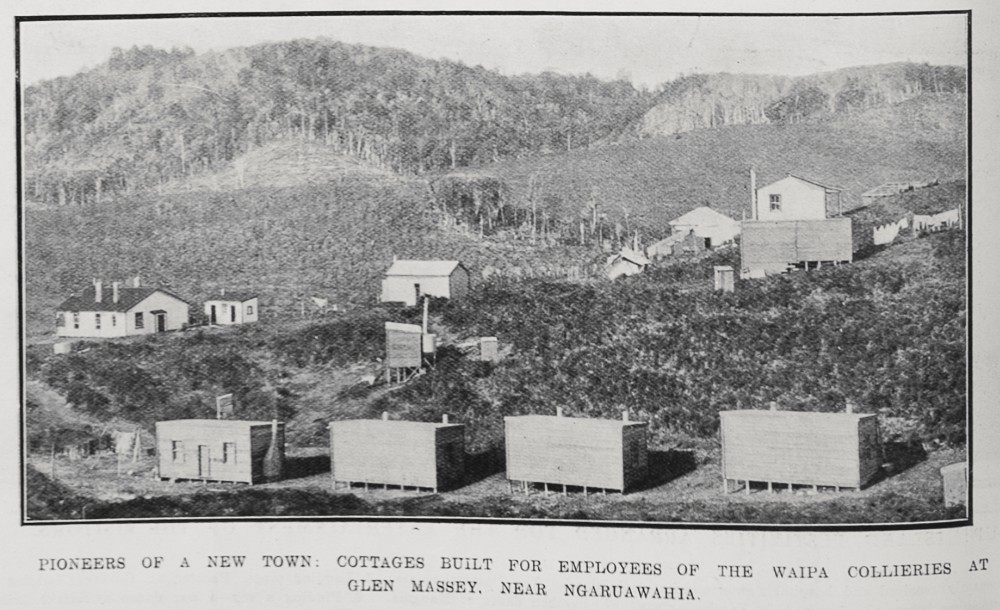
miners cottages

=== Te Akatea settlement ===
After confiscation in 1863, the area was next mentioned in 1879 as not belonging to the Waste Lands Board. At Te Akatea, in 1887, a village settlement of 22 families was formed. An 1888 report said, "I determined when opportunity presented to see if the solution of the problem here was to be a success. These settlements extend from Firewood Creek to within 7 miles of the Hot Springs, and about the same distance from Ngāruawāhia. The land being of fair quality, consisting of both bush and open fern land. They erected 12 timber houses, felled bush, sown grass, orchards, gardens, fenced, grew wheat. Around this settlement 20,000 acres of Government land are now being surveyed for settlement." Te Akatea post office opened in 1889. The first mention of Te Akatea in the annual sheep returns was in 1891.

=== Mining village ===
At its peak Glen Massey had a general store, butcher, post office (replacing Te Akatea in 1914), hall, church and a fire station. The medical association had 120 members in 1919 and 90 in 1920.

A 1919 Board of Trade report described Glen Massey's poor housing, saying it, "is totally inadequate for the needs of the workers, and overcrowding exists. In one case, a miner, with his wife and five children, is living in a two-roomed cottage, and in another ease there are five persons (three children) living in two rooms. At least 10 roomy houses are required for immediate needs. The huts provided by the Waipa Company at present have no fire-places or water tanks, and both these necessary conveniences should be provided."

The village also had a sawmill, brickworks and a pottery. The butcher closed in 1962, the store in 1967 and the post office in 1984.

=== Roads ===
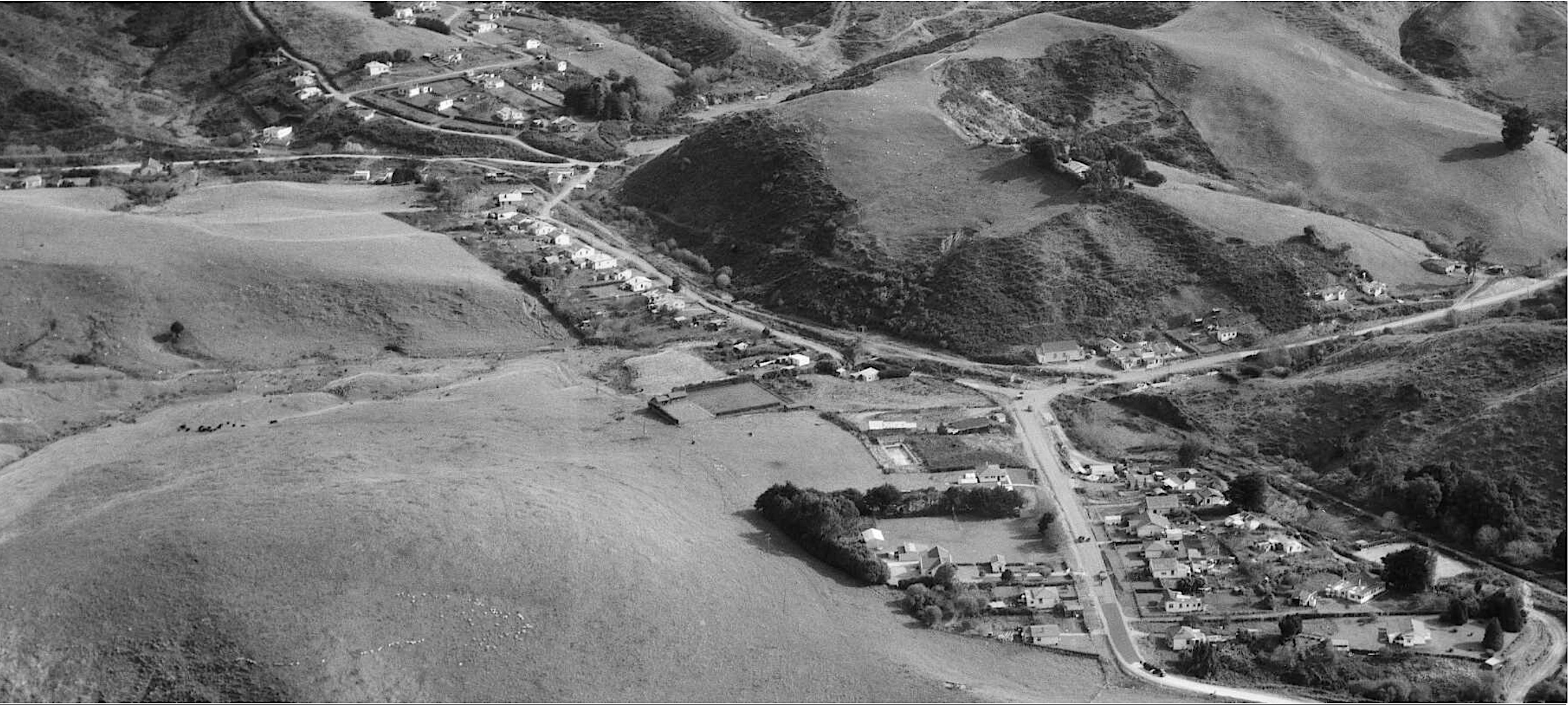
Glen Massey on the day the railway closed in 1958

By 1886 there was a route between Waingaro Landing on the Raglan Harbour and Ngāruawāhia via the Waingaro Hot Springs. In 1888 it was still only a bridle track and the settlers were asking for government employment on the roads. By 1929 it was said to be in "fair order" and metalled. Road improvement is being carried out. relief work on the road. inspected by minister. The road from Ngāruawāhia to Te Ākau was sealed by 1976.

=== Buses ===
In 1921 Bob Gibb of Ngāruawāhia took over the mail run to Waingaro and Te Akau and cream run to the Ngāruawāhia butter factory, with a solid tyred International. Daily buses ran from 1930 until between 1958 and 1961.

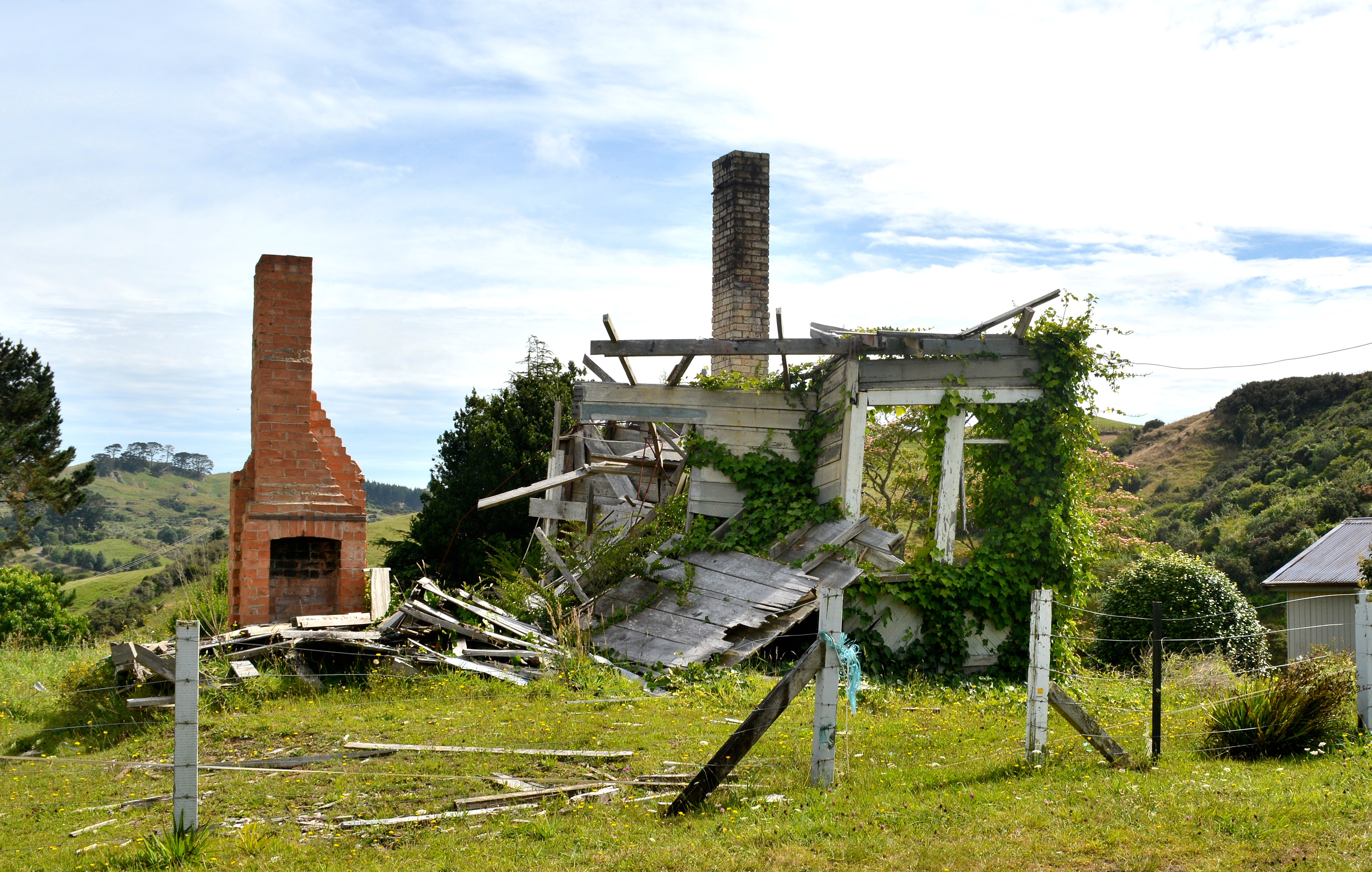
Derelict house

=== Education ===
The first school in Waingaro was opened in 1892. Education was for 3 days, the other 3 days of the week was given by the same teacher at Te Akatea. Te Akatea School was renamed Glen Massey School in 1914, when the church was moved across the road for use as a school, a marquee was erected and the permanent school opened on 1 February 1915.

Glen Massey School is now a state full primary (years 1-8) school, with 5 classrooms, 6 teachers, a principal, a deputy principal, special needs teacher and 2 teacher aides. Pupil numbers rose from 58 in 1915 to a peak of 146 and 4 teachers in 1957, falling to 64 in 1960. The school had a roll of 124 as of July 2026. In the 2018 Education Review Office report, a third of the students were Māori.

=== Utilities ===
A private telephone line was being planned in 1914, though a public phone was provided that year and arrangements were being made for a line in 1902. The 1905 estimates had provided for a line from Ngāruawāhia to Waingaro, on which a loss was reported in 1907.

Electricity supply was investigated in 1925 and, in 1930, it was said a line to Wilton Collieries and the village, "would be undertaken as early as possible". Electric street lights came in 1936.

== Demographics ==
At its peak Glen Massey village was home to about 400, but declined after the colliery closures. It is now growing slightly and becoming more prosperous, presumably as, like other parts of the Waikato Western Hills area (up from 1026 in 2006 to 1242 in 2013), it has more commuters to Hamilton.

Glen Massey locality covers 89.00 km^{2} (34.36 sq mi), which overlaps with Waingaro. It is part of the larger Te Ākau statistical area.

Historical population
Year	Pop.	±% p.a.
2006	414	—
2013	423	+0.31%
2018	474	+2.30%
2023	480	+0.25%

Glen Massey had a population of 480 in the 2023 New Zealand census, an increase of 6 people (1.3%) since the 2018 census, and an increase of 57 people (13.5%) since the 2013 census. There were 264 males, 210 females and 3 people of other genders in 174 dwellings. 2.5% of people identified as LGBTIQ+. There were 78 people (16.2%) aged under 15 years, 69 (14.4%) aged 15 to 29, 267 (55.6%) aged 30 to 64, and 60 (12.5%) aged 65 or older.

People could identify as more than one ethnicity. The results were 85.6% European (Pākehā), 26.2% Māori, 1.2% Pasifika, 1.2% Asian, and 4.4% other, which includes people giving their ethnicity as "New Zealander". English was spoken by 97.5%, Māori language by 3.8%, and other languages by 4.4%. No language could be spoken by 1.9% (e.g. too young to talk). New Zealand Sign Language was known by 1.2%. The percentage of people born overseas was 12.5, compared with 28.8% nationally.

Religious affiliations were 21.9% Christian, 1.2% Māori religious beliefs, 0.6% New Age, and 1.2% other religions. People who answered that they had no religion were 68.1%, and 6.2% of people did not answer the census question.

Of those at least 15 years old, 66 (16.4%) people had a bachelor's or higher degree, 219 (54.5%) had a post-high school certificate or diploma, and 111 (27.6%) people exclusively held high school qualifications. 36 people (9.0%) earned over $100,000 compared to 12.1% nationally. The employment status of those at least 15 was that 204 (50.7%) people were employed full-time, 51 (12.7%) were part-time, and 24 (6.0%) were unemployed.
