= Awaroa River (Waikato River tributary) =

Coordinates: 37°18′7″S 174°45′30″E

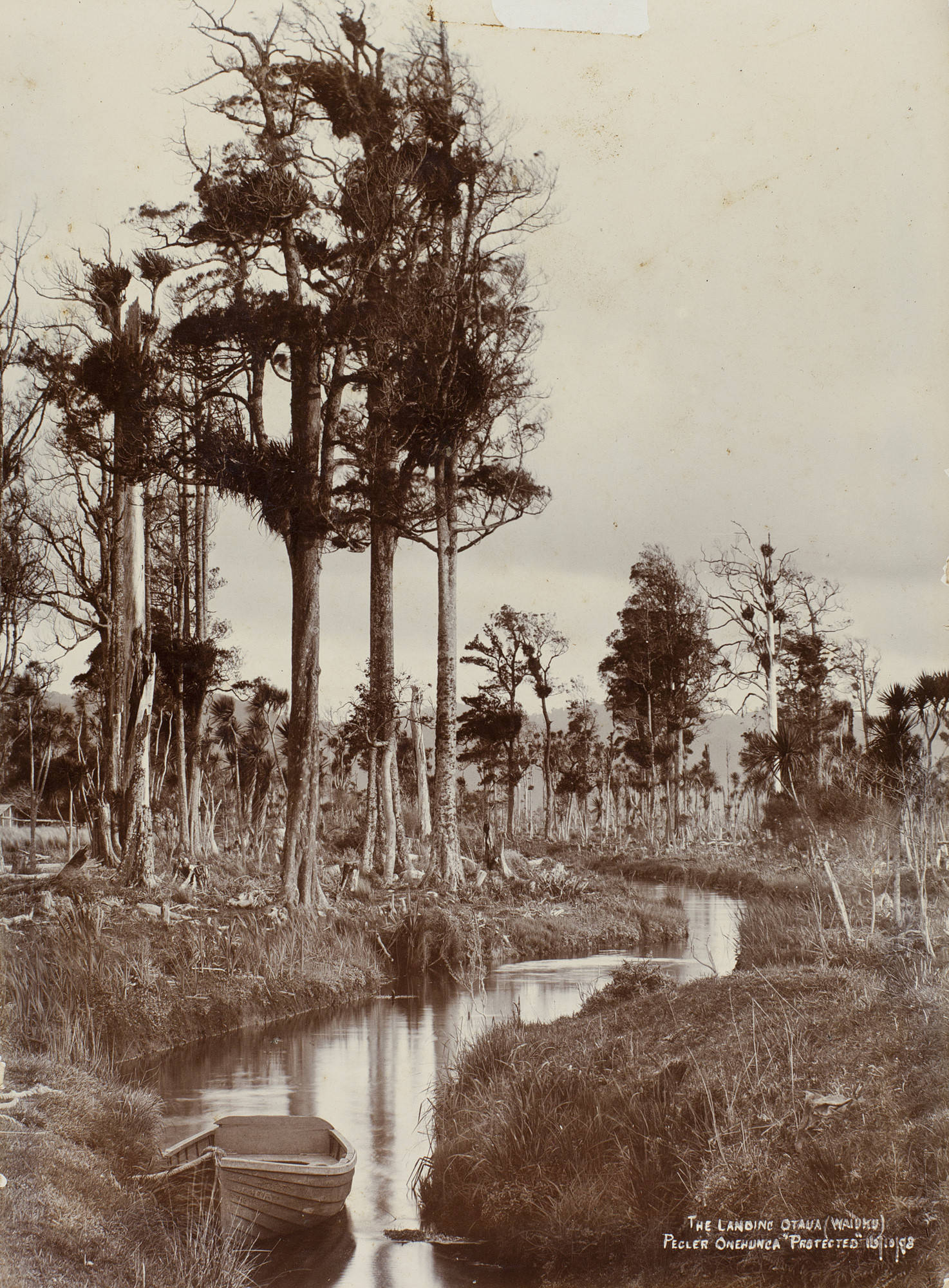
- The Awaroa River at Otaua in 1898

- Location within New Zealand

Location
- Country: New Zealand

Physical characteristics
- Source
  - location: near Karioitahi
  - elevation: 100 m (330 ft)
- Mouth
  - location: Waikato River
  - elevation: 0 m (0 ft)
- Length: 12 km (7.5 mi)
- Basin size: 25.06 km^{2} (9.68 sq mi)

The Awaroa River is a short river in the Waikato District of New Zealand's North Island. It flows east from its source in the dunes near Karioitahi Beach and Lake Puketi, then south from Waiuku joining with the Aka Aka Stream before reaching the Waikato River in its tidal reaches close to Motutieke Island.

Despite being only 12 km (7.5 mi) long, its Māori name to English translates to 'long river'. It is a name used by 33 other locations, including two in Northland (Awaroa River, the same length, and the other, rather longer, flowing into the Wairoa River), 9 of them in Waikato Region (two other Waikato tributaries not far south of this river, which the Regional Council distinguishes from the others with the appendage 'Waiuku', one flowing into Lake Whangape, the other into Lake Waahi, another stream flowing into the Piako River, Awaroa River flowing into Kawhia Harbour, two Awaroa Streams in Coromandel, one flowing into Kennedy Bay, the other a tributary of the Opitonui River) and a river north of Kaiteretere.

The river is the Waikato's 11th most polluted out of 26.

In the 1850s the Awaroa was an important link in the trade between Waikato and Auckland. It was navigated by waka and produce and/or canoes portaged to Manukau Harbour, along Te Pai o Kaiwaka portage, near Waiuku. A canal or tramway was considered as early as 1850 for bringing coal from Huntly and again in 1855. A 1921 report also considered a canal or railway, but also rejected them as too expensive for the likely traffic.
