= Tawatahi River =

Coordinates: 37°45′S 174°56′E

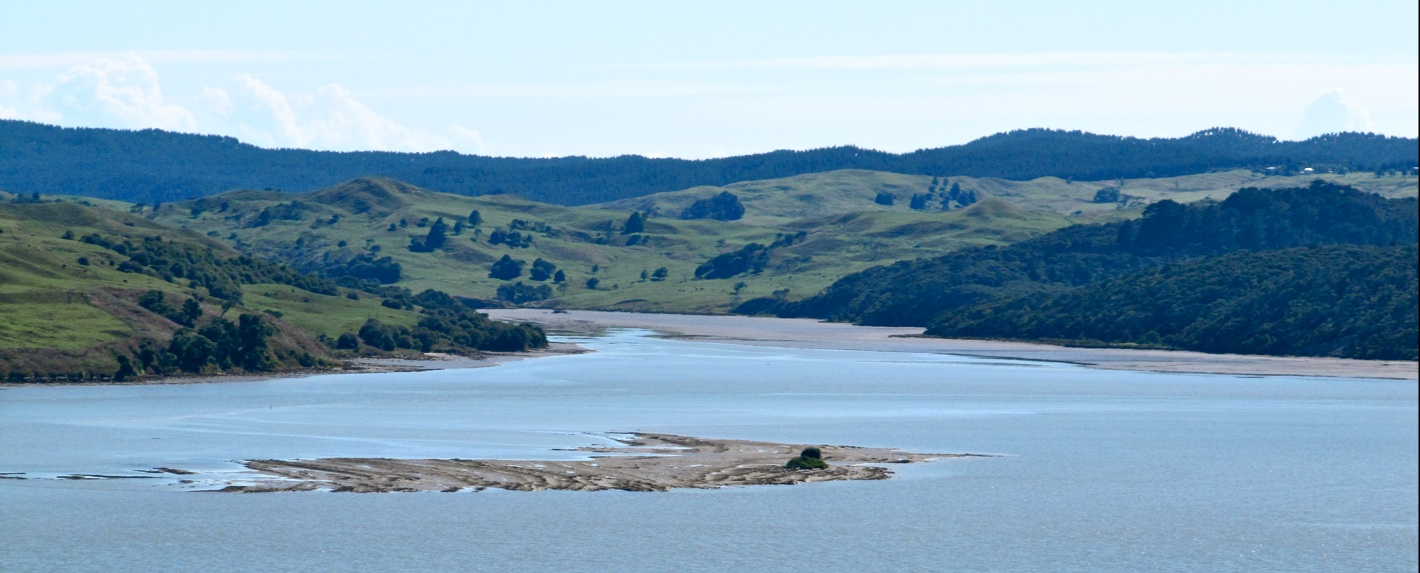
- Tawatahi River and Te Teko Island

Location
- Country: New Zealand

Physical characteristics
- Source
  - elevation: 176 m (577 ft)
- Mouth
  - location: Raglan Harbour
  - elevation: 0 m (0 ft)
- Length: 2 km (1.2 mi)

The Tawatahi River is a short river of the Waikato Region of New Zealand's North Island. It flows into the northern shore of Raglan Harbour.

== Geology ==
The headwaters are listed as worthy of preservation for their geology - "New Katuku Trig / Pukewharangi Hill Oligocene fossil locality" Most of the rock in the valley is Kotuku siltstone, a massive to crudely bedded, light- to blue-grey jointed, calcareous siltstone. The upper slopes are mainly Mangiti Sandstone and Patikirau Siltstone, also calcareous rocks. All were laid on a deepening mid to outer shelf in the Whaingaroan age, about 41 million years ago.

== Alternative names ==
The river has also been called Burgess's Creek, after the farmer who owned Burgess Point to the west, Kerikeri Peninsula, or Puketutu. James Burgess farmed almost 600 sheep in the late C19th, having previously been a shepherd on Te Ākau Station, which had included this area. He had burnt the flax and sown grass on the peninsula.

== Wildlife ==
A 2012 survey found the estuary had a wide band of rushes grading into native forest, with mud crabs, titiko, coastal daisy, makaka, oioi, fescue, marsh clubrush, remuremu, sea primrose, sand buttercup, kowhai, kanuka, miro, tanekaha and hangehange.

== See also ==
- List of rivers of New Zealand
