= Parkinsons Lake =

Lake in New Zealand

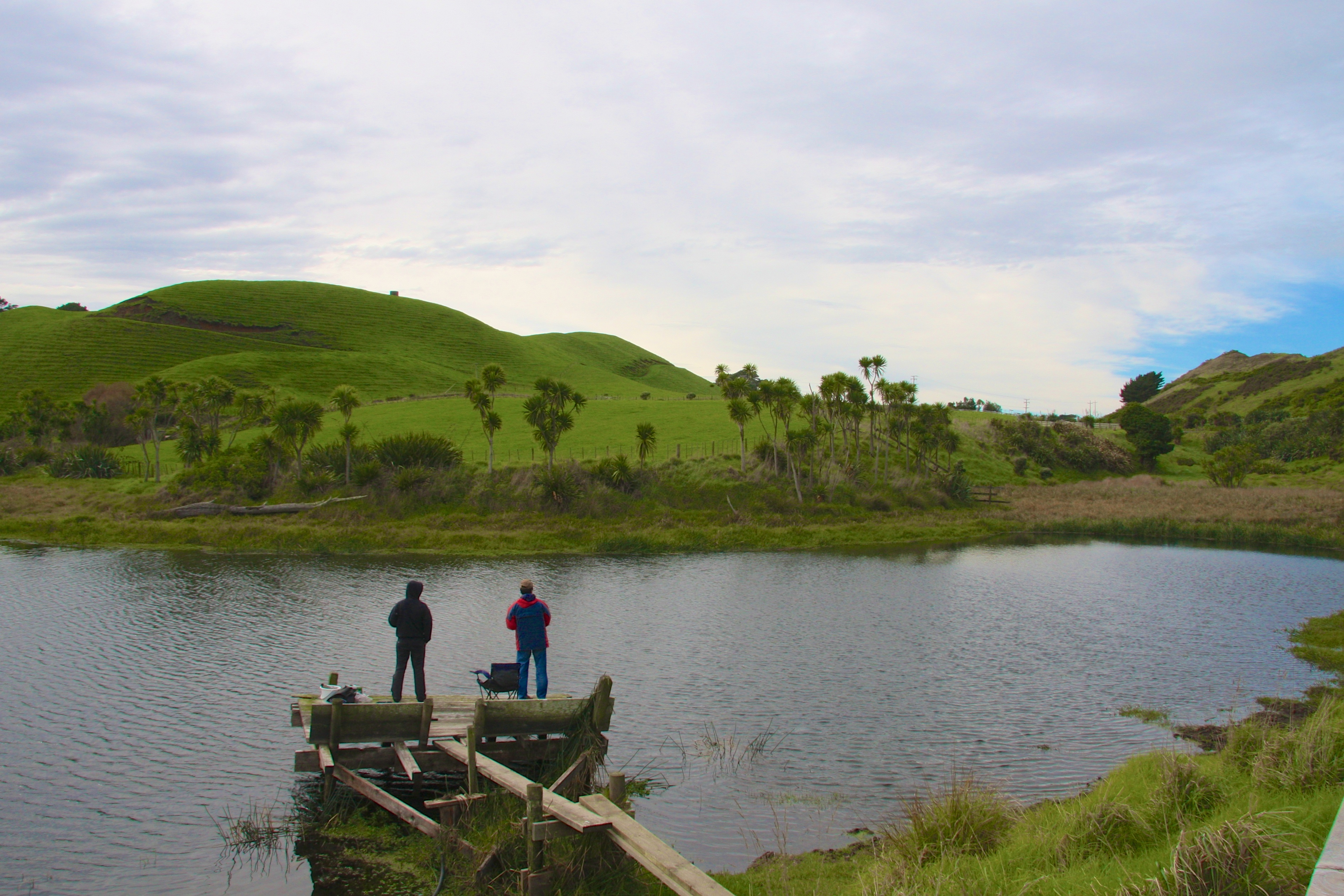
- Trout fishing on Parkinsons Lake

- Location within North Island
- Location: Waikato District, North Island
- Coordinates: 37°18′53.2″S 174°41′04.5″E
- Basin countries: New Zealand
- Surface area: 1.92 ha (4.7 acres)

Parkinsons Lake is a eutrophic, 1.92 ha, sand dune lake in the Waikato District of New Zealand, near the southern part of Karioitahi Beach. It was once choked by dense growths of native and introduced aquatic plants.

== See also ==
- List of lakes in New Zealand
