= Pukerimu =

Locality in Waikato, New Zealand

- Village
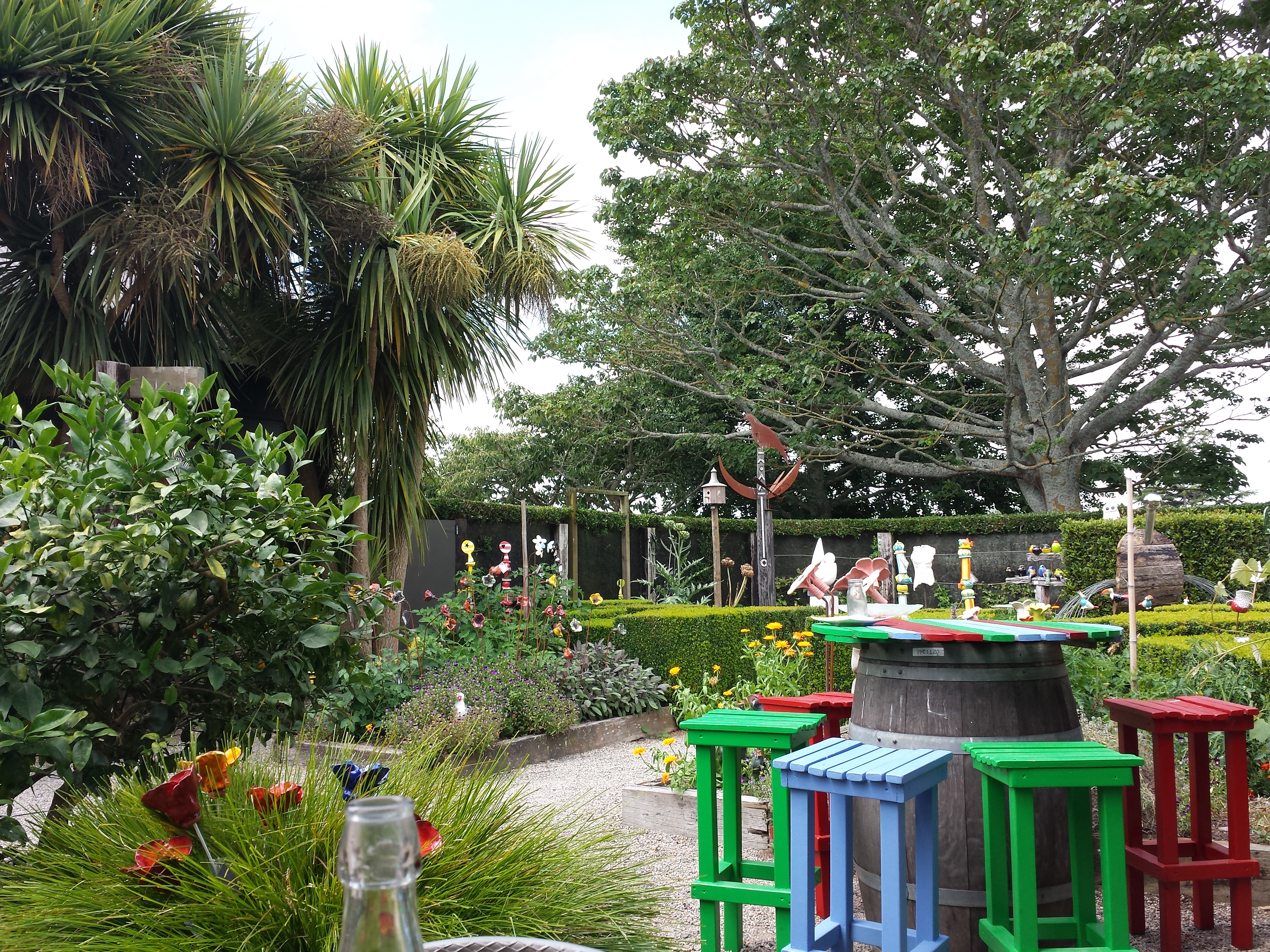
- Lily Pad Cafe
- Interactive map of Pukerimu
- Coordinates: 37.905°S 175.433°E
- Country: New Zealand
- Region: Waikato
- District: Waipā District
- Ward: Cambridge General Ward; Maungatautari General Ward
- Community: Cambridge Community
- Electorates: Taupō; Hauraki-Waikato (Māori)

Government
  - Territorial Authority: Waipā District Council
  - Regional council: Waikato Regional Council
  - Mayor of Waipa: Mike Pettit
  - Taupō MP: Louise Upston
  - Hauraki-Waikato MP: Hana-Rawhiti Maipi-Clarke

Area
  - Territorial: 6.64 km^{2} (2.56 sq mi)

Population (2023 Census)
  - Territorial: 225
  - Density: 33.9/km^{2} (87.8/sq mi)
- Time zone: UTC+12 (NZST)
  - Summer (DST): UTC+13 (NZDT)

Pukerimu is a rural locality southwest of Cambridge in the Waipā District and Waikato region of New Zealand's North Island.

The name is Māori and comes from a rimu tree on a small hill (in Māori puke), which was a landmark for travellers before European settlement.

== History ==
The area was densely populated and farmed by Māori before European settlement. The Waikato River allowed movement to other parts of the country. In 1864 as part of the Invasion of the Waikato, British forces landed at Pukerimu and built redoubts on each side of the river. From 1865, European settlers, some of them soldiers from the invasion, farmed the land.

A church was built in 1871 and shared between Methodists and Presbyterians. It moved to Kaipaki in 1901, and in 1928, it was replaced with a new church which was also used by Anglicans.

=== Education ===
Pukerimu School opened in 1876, but moved west to Kaipaki in 1920.

== Demographics ==
Pukerimu locality covers 6.64 km^{2} (2.56 sq mi). It is part of the larger Pukerimu statistical area.

Historical population for Pukerimu and surrounds
Year	Pop.	±% p.a.
2006	135	—
2013	165	+2.91%
2018	204	+4.33%
2023	225	+1.98%

Pukerimu locality had a population of 225 in the 2023 New Zealand census, an increase of 21 people (10.3%) since the 2018 census, and an increase of 60 people (36.4%) since the 2013 census. There were 111 males and 114 females in 81 dwellings. 4.0% of people identified as LGBTIQ+. The median age was 44.4 years (compared with 38.1 years nationally). There were 42 people (18.7%) aged under 15 years, 45 (20.0%) aged 15 to 29, 93 (41.3%) aged 30 to 64, and 48 (21.3%) aged 65 or older.

People could identify as more than one ethnicity. The results were 86.7% European (Pākehā), 6.7% Māori, 2.7% Pasifika, 9.3% Asian, and 2.7% other, which includes people giving their ethnicity as "New Zealander". English was spoken by 98.7%, Māori by 2.7%, Samoan by 1.3%, and other languages by 13.3%. The percentage of people born overseas was 25.3, compared with 28.8% nationally.

Religious affiliations were 30.7% Christian, and 8.0% other religions. People who answered that they had no religion were 56.0%, and 5.3% of people did not answer the census question.

Of those at least 15 years old, 45 (24.6%) people had a bachelor's or higher degree, 84 (45.9%) had a post-high school certificate or diploma, and 54 (29.5%) people exclusively held high school qualifications. The median income was $54,300, compared with $41,500 nationally. 36 people (19.7%) earned over $100,000 compared to 12.1% nationally. The employment status of those at least 15 was 108 (59.0%) full-time and 30 (16.4%) part-time.

=== Pukerimu statistical area ===
Pukerimu statistical area covers 76.58 km^{2} (29.57 sq mi) and had an estimated population of 990 as of June 2025, with a population density of 13 people per km^{2}.

Historical population for the statistical area
Year	Pop.	±% p.a.
2006	732	—
2013	849	+2.14%
2018	873	+0.56%
2023	951	+1.73%
The 2006 population is for a larger area of 77.25 km^{2}. Source:

Pukerimu statistical area had a population of 951 in the 2023 New Zealand census, an increase of 78 people (8.9%) since the 2018 census, and an increase of 102 people (12.0%) since the 2013 census. There were 474 males, 474 females, and 3 people of other genders in 360 dwellings. 2.2% of people identified as LGBTIQ+. The median age was 40.4 years (compared with 38.1 years nationally). There were 192 people (20.2%) aged under 15 years, 174 (18.3%) aged 15 to 29, 435 (45.7%) aged 30 to 64, and 147 (15.5%) aged 65 or older.

People could identify as more than one ethnicity. The results were 91.8% European (Pākehā); 7.6% Māori; 1.9% Pasifika; 4.4% Asian; 0.3% Middle Eastern, Latin American and African New Zealanders (MELAA); and 0.9% other, which includes people giving their ethnicity as "New Zealander". English was spoken by 97.5%, Māori by 2.8%, Samoan by 0.6%, and other languages by 10.1%. No language could be spoken by 2.2% (e.g. too young to talk). New Zealand Sign Language was known by 0.3%. The percentage of people born overseas was 21.5, compared with 28.8% nationally.

Religious affiliations were 29.7% Christian, 0.3% Hindu, 0.3% Māori religious beliefs, 0.6% New Age, and 2.8% other religions. People who answered that they had no religion were 59.9%, and 6.3% of people did not answer the census question.

Of those at least 15 years old, 183 (24.1%) people had a bachelor's or higher degree, 411 (54.2%) had a post-high school certificate or diploma, and 168 (22.1%) people exclusively held high school qualifications. The median income was $51,300, compared with $41,500 nationally. 153 people (20.2%) earned over $100,000 compared to 12.1% nationally. The employment status of those at least 15 was 441 (58.1%) full-time, 120 (15.8%) part-time, and 6 (0.8%) unemployed.
