= John Paul Clarkin =

New Zealand polo player

- Born: 5 June 1978; New Zealand
- Occupation: Polo player
- Spouse: Nina Clarkin
- Parent(s): Paul Clarkin; Chele Clarkin
- Relatives: Matthew Clarkin (brother)

John Paul Clarkin (born 5 June 1978) is a professional polo player.

== Early life ==
John Paul Clarkin was born on 5 June 1978 in New Zealand. He is the eldest son of Chele and Paul Clarkin. His brother, Matthew Clarkin, is a professional rugby player.

== Career ==
In 2003 John-Paul won the prestigious Veuve Clicquot Gold Cup, held in Cowdray, Midhurst and in 2008 the Cartier Polo World Cup on Snow in St. Moritz, Switzerland. He is currently the highest ranked New Zealand polo player on 8-goals.

In 2007, on the Cadenza team, together with Tony Pidgley, Tomas Fernandez Llorente and Nicolas Espain, he won the Prince of Wales Trophy. In 2010, on the Emlor team, he won it again with Spencer McCarthy, Ignacio Gonzalez and Joaquin Pittaluga.

He spends the major part of each year overseas playing polo in Australia, England, Argentina and South Africa as well as New Zealand.

== Personal life ==
On 2 September 2006, he married Nina Vestey, a niece of the Samuel Vestey, 3rd Baron Vestey, Master of the Horse.

== Controversies ==
In 2024, he was accused of being involved in a money laundering network, headed by Alessandro Bazzoni and Siri Evjemo-Nysveen, dedicated to the purchase of polo horses with money from corruption in the Venezuelan oil company PDVSA through the companies CGC One Planet and Clareville Grove Capital.
