= Nina Clarkin =

British polo player

- Born: Carina Vestey
- Education: The Cheltenham Ladies' College; University of the West of England
- Occupation: Polo player
- Spouse: John Paul Clarkin
- Parent(s): Mark Vestey; Rose Vestey
- Relatives: Samuel Vestey, 3rd Baron Vestey (paternal uncle); Paul Clarkin (father-in-law)

Nina Clarkin is a British polo player.

== Early life ==
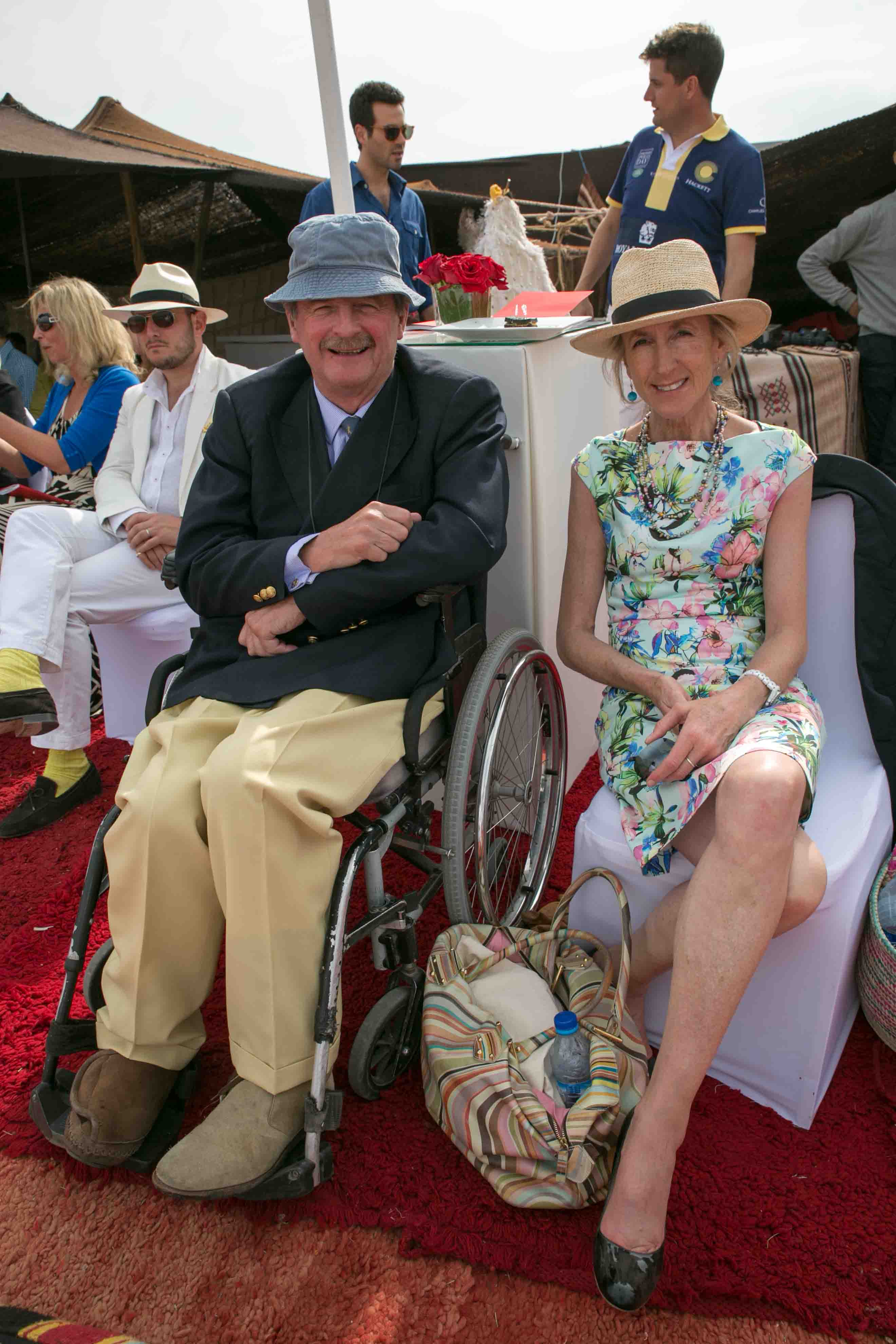
Parents Mark and Rosie Vestey in 2014

Carina Vestey was born circa 1983. Her father, Mark Vestey, (b. 1943, d. 2016) was a former polo player. Her mother, Rose Vestey, is the Master of the Cotswold Hunt. Her paternal uncle is Samuel Vestey, 3rd Baron Vestey. She has a brother, Ben, and a sister, Tamara. She grew up at Foxcote Manor in Foxcote, Gloucestershire, in the Cotswolds.

She was educated at The Cheltenham Ladies' College in Cheltenham. She graduated from the University of the West of England, where she received a Bachelor of Arts degree in English. Clarkin is distantly related to actor Tom Hiddleston.

== Career ==
She worked for Sotheby's in New York City.

== Polo ==
Nina Clarkin is a polo player with a polo handicap (outdoor) currently at 4 goals.

She is credited in the introduction of Ladies Handicaps for the British Hurlingham Polo Association where she currently has the highest Hurlingham Women's handicap of 10.

In 2003, she won the Cowdray Park Gold Cup on the Hindon Polo Team, defeating the Labegorce Polo Team.

== Personal life ==
She is married to John Paul Clarkin, a polo player from New Zealand.
