= Porritt =

Porritt is a surname. Notable people with the surname include:

- Sir Arthur Porritt, Baron Porritt, Bt, GCMG, GCVO, CBE (1900–1994), New Zealand physician, military surgeon, statesman and athlete
- B. D. Porritt FRSE (1884–1940) British chemist
- George Taylor Porritt (1848–1927), English naturalist who studied the peppered moth
- Jonathon Porritt, CBE (born 1950), British environmentalist and writer, advocate of the Green Party
- Luisa Porritt (born 1987), Liberal Democrat politician in London
- Nathan Porritt (born 1990), English footballer
- Richard Porritt (businessman) (1901–1985), Canadian mining industry executive, inductee to the Canadian Mining Hall of Fame
- Richard Whitaker Porritt (1910–1940), UK Member of Parliament for Heywood and Radcliffe, the first British MP killed in World War II
- Trevor Porritt (born 1961), former Canadian field hockey player who played for the Canada men's national field hockey team
- Walter Porritt (1914–1993), English professional footballer

== See also ==
- Porritt Baronets
- Porrittia
- Portrait
- Portti
