= Paul Clarkin =

New Zealand polo player

Paul Clarkin

Paul Francis Clarkin (21 August 1950 – 22 July 2004) was a New Zealand polo player.

== Biography ==
Clarkin started playing polo in his early twenties. He was known internationally as 'Mr Polo'. Together with his wife Chele, he ran a polo club. He also compete as a show-jumper and eventer, and he was a keen huntsman.

He was married to Chele Clarkin. They had one daughter and two sons:

- Emma Clarkin, who was studying law at the time of her death in a car accident at the age of 19.
- John-Paul Clarkin, a successful polo player who took over the running of Mystery Creek Polo Club in New Zealand after the death of his father and is married to Nina (née Vestey) of an equally prestigious polo playing family based in Gloucestershire, England.
- Matthew Clarkin playing TOP 14 rugby in 2011 as captain of Union Bordeaux Bègles in France.

He died playing polo in at the Cirencester Park Polo Club in Cirencester, England, after falling during a game in which he was reputedly "playing a blinder".
