= Ōhaupō =

Settlement in Waikato, New Zealand

- Rural locality
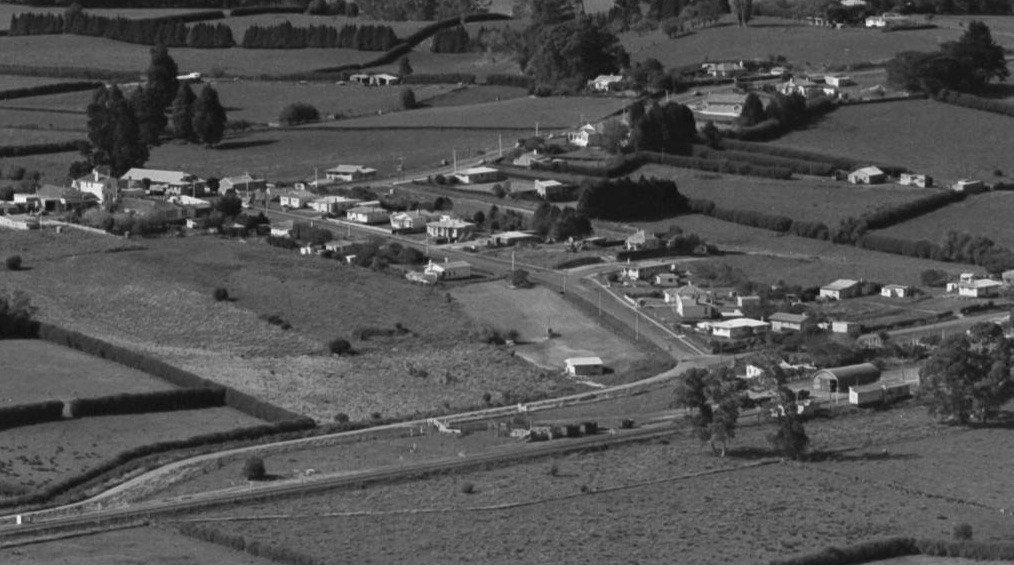
- Aerial photo of Ohaupo in April 1964
- Interactive map of Ōhaupō
- Coordinates: 37.91989°S 175.307465°E
- Country: New Zealand
- Region: Waikato
- District: Waipā District
- Ward: Pirongia-Kakepuku General Ward
- Electorates: Taranaki-King Country; Hauraki-Waikato (Māori)

Government
  - Territorial Authority: Waipā District Council
  - Regional council: Waikato Regional Council
  - Mayor of Waipa: Mike Pettit
  - Taranaki-King Country MP: Barbara Kuriger
  - Hauraki-Waikato MP: Hana-Rawhiti Maipi-Clarke

Area
  - Total: 1.54 km^{2} (0.59 sq mi)

Population (June 2025)
  - Total: 790
  - Density: 510/km^{2} (1,300/sq mi)
- Time zone: UTC+12 (NZST)
  - Summer (DST): UTC+13 (NZDT)
- Postcode: 3803
- Area code: 07

Ōhaupō is a rural community in the Waipā District and Waikato region of New Zealand's North Island. It is located on State Highway 3, about halfway between Hamilton and Te Awamutu.

The Ōhaupō area and surrounding Ngāhinapōuri, Te Rore and Harapēpē area were military outposts during the Waikato War and a military fortification was built about one kilometre north of the township in April 1864. Other military fortifications had been built at nearby Ngāhinapōuri, Tuhikaramea and Te Rore four months earlier, in December 1863.

The earliest European settlers in Ōhaupō were Bohemian militiamen from the Puhoi settlement north of Auckland. As of 2015, many descendants of these militiamen still lived in the area.

In July 2020, the name of the locality was officially gazetted as Ōhaupō by the New Zealand Geographic Board. The New Zealand Ministry for Culture and Heritage gives a translation of "place of a breeze at night" for Ōhaupō.

The Ohaupo railway station was a train station on the North Island Main Trunk It included a ladies' waiting room, public vestibule, ticket lobby, stationmaster's office, an asphalt platform, goods shed and a 7-room stationmaster's house. In 1927 the station was handling almost 2,700 tons of fertiliser each year.

The Mystery Creek Events Centre east of the township hosts the Southern Hemisphere's largest agricultural event, Fieldays.

== Demographics ==
Statistics New Zealand describes Ōhaupō as a rural settlement, which covers 1.54 km^{2} (0.59 sq mi) and had an estimated population of 790 as of June 2025, with a population density of 513 people per km^{2}. The settlement is part of the larger Kaipaki statistical area.

Historical population for Ōhaupō
Year	Pop.	±% p.a.
2006	423	—
2013	516	+2.88%
2018	600	+3.06%
2023	783	+5.47%

Ōhaupō had a population of 783 in the 2023 New Zealand census, an increase of 183 people (30.5%) since the 2018 census, and an increase of 267 people (51.7%) since the 2013 census. There were 372 males, 408 females and 3 people of other genders in 243 dwellings. 2.3% of people identified as LGBTIQ+. The median age was 38.2 years (compared with 38.1 years nationally). There were 201 people (25.7%) aged under 15 years, 87 (11.1%) aged 15 to 29, 345 (44.1%) aged 30 to 64, and 150 (19.2%) aged 65 or older.

People could identify as more than one ethnicity. The results were 87.7% European (Pākehā); 11.1% Māori; 1.1% Pasifika; 6.5% Asian; 1.1% Middle Eastern, Latin American and African New Zealanders (MELAA); and 5.4% other, which includes people giving their ethnicity as "New Zealander". English was spoken by 96.9%, Māori language by 2.7%, and other languages by 10.0%. No language could be spoken by 1.9% (e.g. too young to talk). New Zealand Sign Language was known by 0.4%. The percentage of people born overseas was 18.8, compared with 28.8% nationally.

Religious affiliations were 30.7% Christian, 1.5% Hindu, 1.1% Islam, 0.4% Māori religious beliefs, 0.8% Buddhist, 0.4% New Age, and 1.1% other religions. People who answered that they had no religion were 57.1%, and 6.9% of people did not answer the census question.

Of those at least 15 years old, 153 (26.3%) people had a bachelor's or higher degree, 306 (52.6%) had a post-high school certificate or diploma, and 114 (19.6%) people exclusively held high school qualifications. The median income was $48,200, compared with $41,500 nationally. 81 people (13.9%) earned over $100,000 compared to 12.1% nationally. The employment status of those at least 15 was that 306 (52.6%) people were employed full-time, 78 (13.4%) were part-time, and 9 (1.5%) were unemployed.

=== Kaipaki statistical area ===
Kaipaki statistical area covers 36.52 km^{2} (14.10 sq mi) and had an estimated population of 1,880 as of June 2025, with a population density of 51 people per km^{2}.

Historical population for Kaipaki statistical area
Year	Pop.	±% p.a.
2006	1,212	—
2013	1,335	+1.39%
2018	1,581	+3.44%
2023	1,821	+2.87%

Kaipaki had a population of 1,821 in the 2023 New Zealand census, an increase of 240 people (15.2%) since the 2018 census, and an increase of 486 people (36.4%) since the 2013 census. There were 894 males, 921 females and 12 people of other genders in 603 dwellings. 2.3% of people identified as LGBTIQ+. The median age was 40.4 years (compared with 38.1 years nationally). There were 396 people (21.7%) aged under 15 years, 252 (13.8%) aged 15 to 29, 861 (47.3%) aged 30 to 64, and 312 (17.1%) aged 65 or older.

People could identify as more than one ethnicity. The results were 90.4% European (Pākehā); 10.2% Māori; 2.5% Pasifika; 4.9% Asian; 0.7% Middle Eastern, Latin American and African New Zealanders (MELAA); and 4.1% other, which includes people giving their ethnicity as "New Zealander". English was spoken by 98.0%, Māori language by 2.0%, Samoan by 0.5%, and other languages by 8.6%. No language could be spoken by 1.6% (e.g. too young to talk). New Zealand Sign Language was known by 0.2%. The percentage of people born overseas was 17.8, compared with 28.8% nationally.

Religious affiliations were 31.5% Christian, 0.8% Hindu, 0.5% Islam, 0.2% Māori religious beliefs, 0.5% Buddhist, 0.2% New Age, 0.2% Jewish, and 1.5% other religions. People who answered that they had no religion were 57.7%, and 7.2% of people did not answer the census question.

Of those at least 15 years old, 369 (25.9%) people had a bachelor's or higher degree, 786 (55.2%) had a post-high school certificate or diploma, and 273 (19.2%) people exclusively held high school qualifications. The median income was $49,300, compared with $41,500 nationally. 240 people (16.8%) earned over $100,000 compared to 12.1% nationally. The employment status of those at least 15 was that 792 (55.6%) people were employed full-time, 222 (15.6%) were part-time, and 18 (1.3%) were unemployed.

== Education ==
Ōhaupō School is a co-educational state primary school, with a roll of 212 as of July 2026. The original school at Ōhaupō was built in 1870, and was the first school in the Waikato. It burned in 1915, and was replaced by the present building the following year.

Kaipaki School is another co-educational state primary school located east of the township, with a roll of 130. The school started as Pukerimu School in 1876, and was moved to its current location in 1920.
