= Matthew Clarkin =

English-New Zealand rugby union footballer

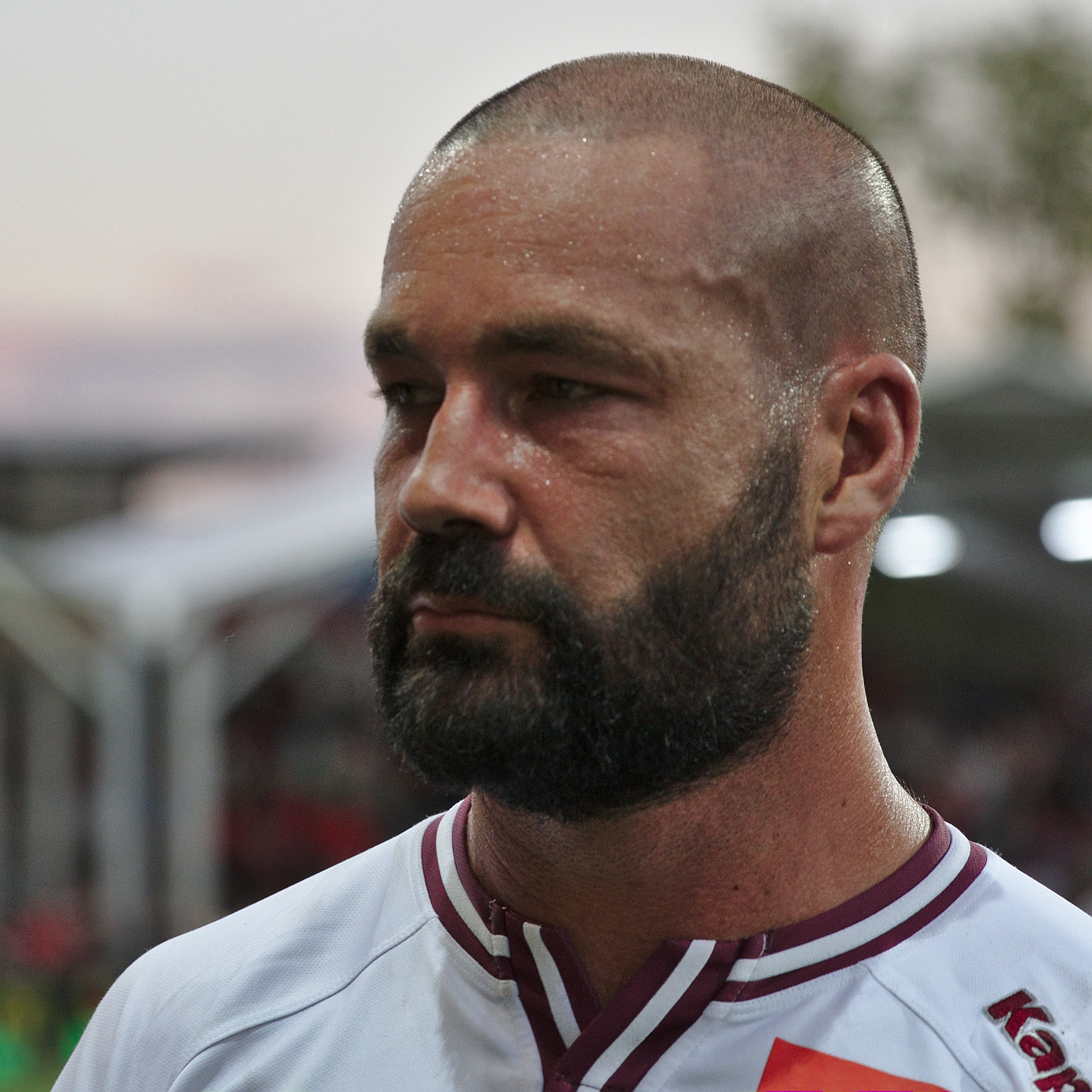
- Born: Matthew Clarkin; 4 July 1981 (age 45) Cirencester, England
- Height: 1.96 m (6 ft 5 in)
- Weight: 105 kg (16.5 st)

Rugby union career
- Position: No.8
Senior career
Years	Team	Apps	(Points)
2004–2010	US Montauban	111	(35)
2010–16	Bordeaux	130	(47)

Matthew (Matt) Clarkin is an English born ex-New Zealand rugby union player and son of Chele and Paul Clarkin who was known internationally as 'Mr Polo'. His elder brother is John-Paul Clarkin a professional polo player.

Clarkin played most of his professional rugby career at the top level in France and was captain of the Top 14 team Union Bordeaux Bègles 2010–2016, retiring from professional rugby after 15/16 season.

He took up a new position in July 2025 and is currently Director of Rugby of the ambitious NISSA RUGBY team situated in Nice. This appointment follows his stint as Director of Rugby of Biarritz Olympique 2018-2024 Biarritz Olympique.

As a player he was described as being someone that is able to orchestrate play, as well as having a strong work ethic and hitting the ball up into the opposition allowing space for the back line.

== Career ==
Clarkin arrived in France in July 2003, aged 22, to play for Bordeaux-based CABBG in the PROD2 league. In 2004 he moved to US Montauban where he played from 2004 to 2010, captaining the side in the 2009–10 Top 14 season. Montauban were liquidated at the end of the 2009–10 season due to financial problems and Clarkin signed a 2-year deal with the Pro D2 team Union Bordeaux Begles (UBB) in April 2010.

Under Clarkin's captaincy, UBB finished 5th in the 2010–11 Rugby Pro D2 season and went on to win the play-offs to gain promotion to the Top 14.

Clarkin finished up with UBB in June 2016. After a 1year stint with Agen Rugby Academy he took up the role as Director of Rugby at Biarritz Olympique Pays Basque in July 2018. Clarkin also attended the French Université de Limoges 2017-2019 and graduated in 2019 with his diploma ‘MANAGER GENERAL DE CLUB SPORTIF PROFESSIONNEL’
