= Te Ākau =

Settlement in Waikato, New Zealand

- Hamlet
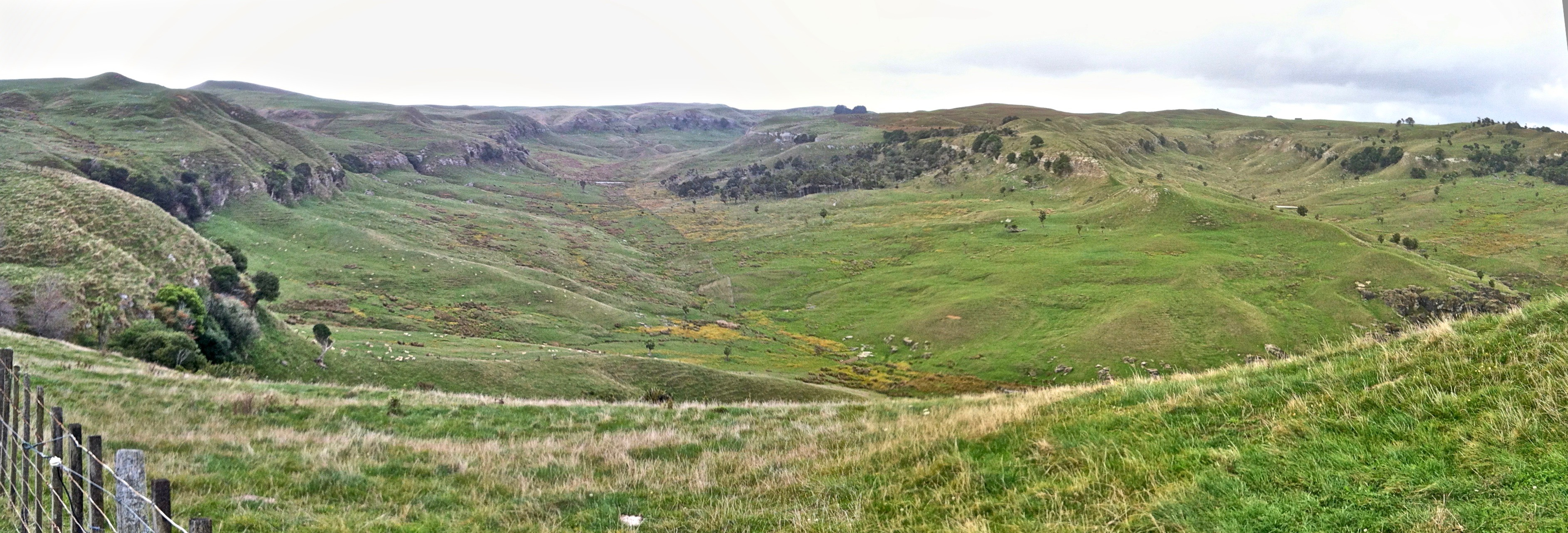
- Raglan Limestone crags from Te Akau Coast Rd – typical of Te Akau scenery
- Interactive map of Te Ākau
- Coordinates: 37°40′41″S 174°51′09″E
- Country: New Zealand
- Region: Waikato
- District: Waikato District
- Wards: Western Districts General Ward; Tai Runga Takiwaa Maaori Ward
- Electorates: Port Waikato; Taranaki-King Country; Hauraki-Waikato (Māori)

Government
  - Territorial Authority: Waikato District Council
  - Regional council: Waikato Regional Council
  - Mayor of Waikato: Aksel Bech
  - Port Waikato MP and Taranaki-King Country MP: Andrew Bayly and Barbara Kuriger
  - Hauraki-Waikato MP: Hana-Rawhiti Maipi-Clarke

Area
  - Territorial: 211.74 km^{2} (81.75 sq mi)
- Elevation: 40 m (130 ft)

Population (2023 Census)
  - Territorial: 273
  - Density: 1.29/km^{2} (3.34/sq mi)
- Time zone: UTC+12 (NZST)
  - Summer (DST): UTC+13 (NZDT)

Te Ākau is a small farming settlement in the North Island of New Zealand, located 62 km (39 mi) north west of Hamilton, 39 km (24 mi) south west of Huntly, 45 km (28 mi) south of Port Waikato and 47 km (29 mi), or 19 km (12 mi) by ferry and road, north of Raglan. It has a hall and a school.

(Te Ākau (officially, Te Ākau / Black Beach) is also the name of a beach in the Marlborough Region of the South Island.)

== Boundaries ==
Te Ākau's only defined boundaries are as a New Zealand census 'statistical area' and a former station. Te Ākau hamlet is near the centre of both, but has no defined boundary. This article covers the southwestern part of the statistical area.

Historically the name was applied to a sheep and cattle station extending from Port Waikato to Raglan, as shown on maps of 1905 (south) and 1906 (north).

Politically it is part of the Onewhero-Te Akau ward of Waikato District Council (Onewhero is the statistical area to the north, extending to the Waikato River and including Limestone Downs, Naike, Port Waikato and Pukekawa) and most of the area unit has been in the Taranaki-King Country general parliamentary constituency since 2014, though the northern area remains in Hunua. The Māori electorate is Hauraki-Waikato.

== Demographics ==
Te Ākau is in two SA1 statistical areas which cover 211.74 km^{2} (81.75 sq mi). The SA1 areas are part of the larger Te Ākau statistical area.

Historical populations for the Te Ākau SA1 areas
| Year | Pop. | ±% p.a. |
|---|---|---|
| 2006 | 255 | — |
| 2013 | 264 | +0.50% |
| 2018 | 300 | +2.59% |
| 2023 | 273 | −1.87% |

The SA1 areas had a population of 273 in the 2023 New Zealand census, a decrease of 27 people (−9.0%) since the 2018 census, and an increase of 9 people (3.4%) since the 2013 census. There were 141 males and 129 females in 105 dwellings. 1.1% of people identified as LGBTIQ+. There were 60 people (22.0%) aged under 15 years, 36 (13.2%) aged 15 to 29, 132 (48.4%) aged 30 to 64, and 42 (15.4%) aged 65 or older.

People could identify as more than one ethnicity. The results were 90.1% European (Pākehā), 15.4% Māori, 1.1% Pasifika, 2.2% Asian, and 2.2% other, which includes people giving their ethnicity as "New Zealander". English was spoken by 96.7%, Māori language by 3.3%, and other languages by 1.1%. No language could be spoken by 2.2% (e.g. too young to talk). The percentage of people born overseas was 13.2, compared with 28.8% nationally.

Religious affiliations were 26.4% Christian, 1.1% Hindu, 3.3% Māori religious beliefs, and 1.1% other religions. People who answered that they had no religion were 61.5%, and 8.8% of people did not answer the census question.

Of those at least 15 years old, 39 (18.3%) people had a bachelor's or higher degree, 120 (56.3%) had a post-high school certificate or diploma, and 51 (23.9%) people exclusively held high school qualifications. 24 people (11.3%) earned over $100,000 compared to 12.1% nationally. The employment status of those at least 15 was that 111 (52.1%) people were employed full-time, 36 (16.9%) were part-time, and 9 (4.2%) were unemployed.

=== Te Ākau statistical area ===
Te Ākau statistical area covers 624.42 km^{2} (241.09 sq mi) and had an estimated population of 1,680 as of June 2025, with a population density of 2.7 people per km^{2}.

Historical population for the statistical area
| Year | Pop. | ±% p.a. |
|---|---|---|
| 2006 | 1,755 | — |
| 2013 | 1,437 | −2.82% |
| 2018 | 1,620 | +2.43% |
| 2023 | 1,668 | +0.59% |
The 2006 population is for a larger area of 804.12 km^{2}. Source:

Te Ākau had a population of 1,668 in the 2023 New Zealand census, an increase of 48 people (3.0%) since the 2018 census, and an increase of 231 people (16.1%) since the 2013 census. There were 882 males, 777 females and 9 people of other genders in 621 dwellings. 1.6% of people identified as LGBTIQ+. The median age was 43.3 years (compared with 38.1 years nationally). There were 315 people (18.9%) aged under 15 years, 243 (14.6%) aged 15 to 29, 867 (52.0%) aged 30 to 64, and 243 (14.6%) aged 65 or older.

People could identify as more than one ethnicity. The results were 86.2% European (Pākehā); 22.8% Māori; 2.3% Pasifika; 1.4% Asian; 0.5% Middle Eastern, Latin American and African New Zealanders (MELAA); and 3.8% other, which includes people giving their ethnicity as "New Zealander". English was spoken by 97.5%, Māori language by 5.6%, Samoan by 0.2%, and other languages by 4.3%. No language could be spoken by 2.0% (e.g. too young to talk). New Zealand Sign Language was known by 0.7%. The percentage of people born overseas was 14.0, compared with 28.8% nationally.

Religious affiliations were 25.2% Christian, 0.2% Hindu, 2.2% Māori religious beliefs, 0.2% Buddhist, 0.5% New Age, 0.2% Jewish, and 0.7% other religions. People who answered that they had no religion were 62.8%, and 8.3% of people did not answer the census question.

Of those at least 15 years old, 252 (18.6%) people had a bachelor's or higher degree, 753 (55.7%) had a post-high school certificate or diploma, and 354 (26.2%) people exclusively held high school qualifications. The median income was $40,300, compared with $41,500 nationally. 135 people (10.0%) earned over $100,000 compared to 12.1% nationally. The employment status of those at least 15 was that 741 (54.8%) people were employed full-time, 192 (14.2%) were part-time, and 39 (2.9%) were unemployed.

== Geology ==
The main geological groups represented in the area are the Kaihu Group of Holocene and Pleistocene pumiceous sands, silts, lignite, and dune sands, the Waitemata Group of Early Miocene sandstones, siltstones and limestones and Te Kuiti Group of Oligocene siltstones and limestones. There are also a couple of small intrusions of Okete Volcanics on the fault to the north of Whaingaroa Harbour, at Te Kaha Point and Horea.

Te Ākau hamlet is mostly on Te Kuiti Group rocks of Waimai Limestone, with Carter Siltstone and Raglan Limestone on the higher ground.

=== Ironsand ===
Following the successful smelting of 100 tons of ironsand in 1866, in 1873 the station leaseholder asked the Government for a lease of the whole foreshore, including permission to use the ironsand, but was refused. The major iron ore mineral is titanomagnetite.

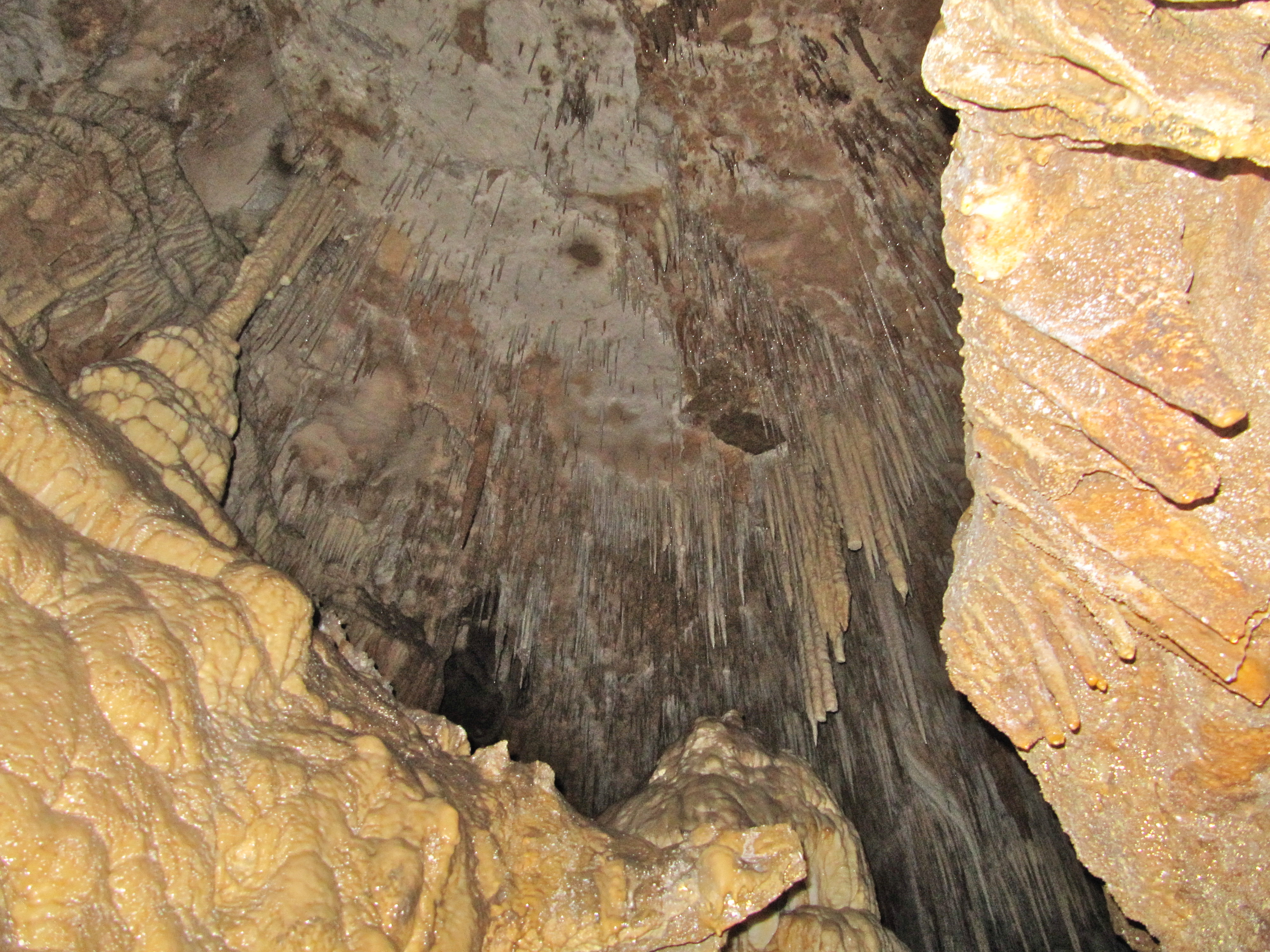
Stalactites and stalagmites in Elgood Limestone cave at Adventure Waikato

In 1957 New Zealand Steel Investigating Co started investigating creation of a steel industry in New Zealand, using N Island W coast ironsands. Its 1962 report led to Glenbrook steelworks and ironsand working at Taharoa and at Waikato North Head. However, in the Raglan North Head area it is estimated there are 25.5 million tons of iron ore concentrate and in the Waikorea/Waimai area 20 million tons.

=== Caves ===
The 1946 one-inch map showed many tomos and the cave in Elgood Limestone, which is now used by Adventure Waikato.

=== Hot spring ===
Waikorea Hot Spring is about 54 °C (129 °F), with some 150 mg/kg Na, 185 mg/kg Cl, 9 mg/kg SO_{4}, 33 mg/kg HCO_{3}, 63 mg/kg SiO_{2} and a flow of about 0.5 imp gal/min (2.3 L/min). It has been suggested that Waikorea, Naike and Waingaro may all source their water from depths of more than 3,000 m (9,800 ft), as they all have similar chemical composition.

== Wildlife ==
A 1909 map showed a mixed podocarp-hardwood forest made up of kahikatea, rimu, rātā and tawa. One of the requirements listed on the map was to 'improve' the land. As early as 1912 there was a petition to protect 50 acres (20 ha) of pūriri bush. Bill Richards moved to Ruakiwi in 1912 and described, "The kākā, or bush parrot, was killed and eaten in large numbers. If by chance one was wounded it would hang by its beak on a limb and call out. In a matter of minutes thousands would answer its call. It was often possible to fill a sack (or run out of ammunition, whichever happened first) without shifting from that one tree." He also described how the bush was cleared and how soon kiwi and kaka became rare.

The Department of Conservation has listed 66 plant species as characteristic of coastal Te Ākau. A 2007 study for the proposed windfarm listed 102 native plants and noted the main bush remnants as 285 ha (700 acres) at Te Kotuku Stream and 147 ha (360 acres) at Matira Road. 291 ha (720 acres) Waikorea Stream wetland has banded dotterel, paradise shelduck, pied stilt, spotless crake and seagulls. Natural areas in Te Ākau, apart from Lake Waikare, have no legal protection.

== History and culture ==
=== Early history ===
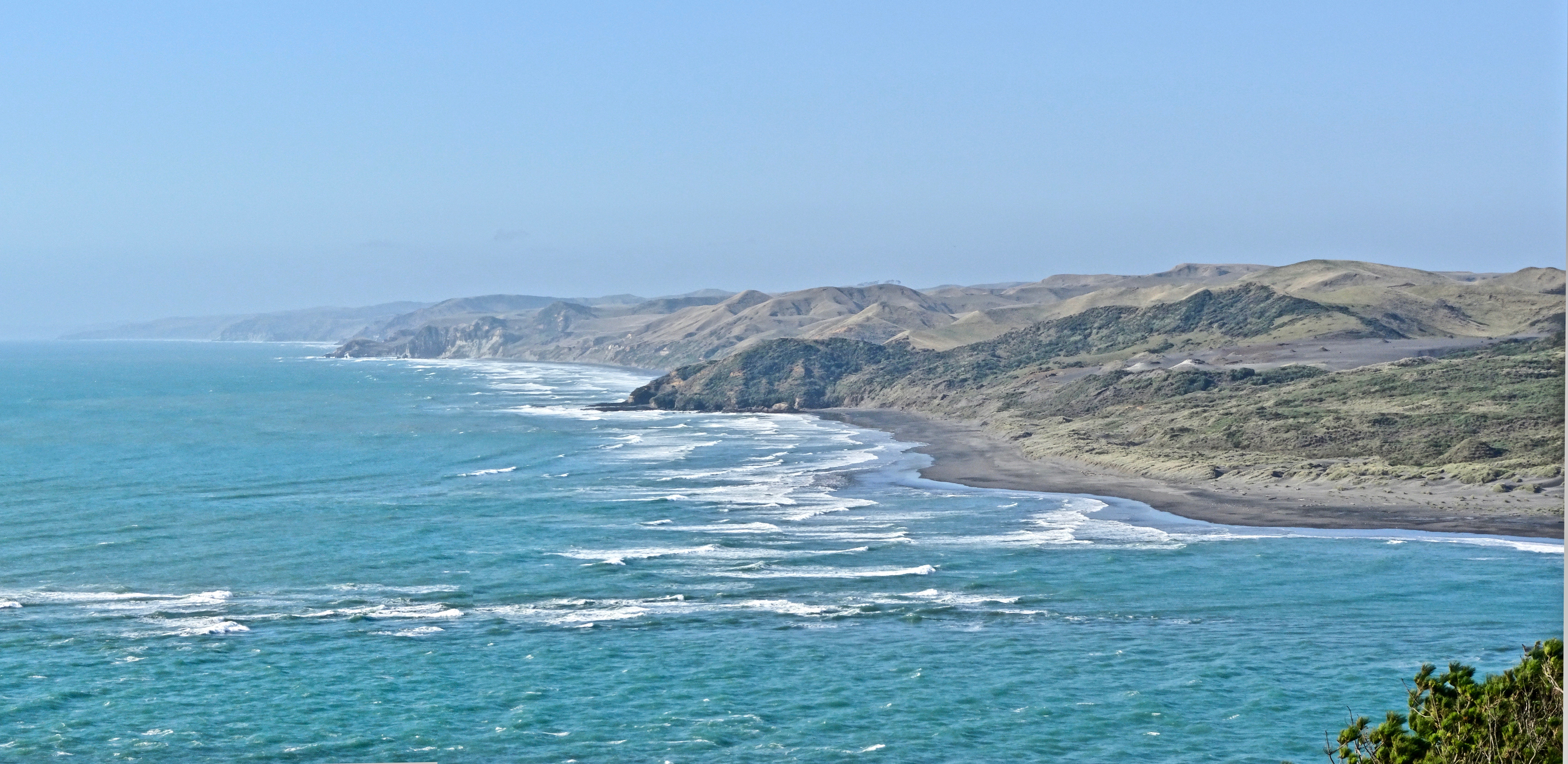
Two shell middens are white mounds towards the right of this view along the Te Akau coast

The area has been inhabited since the 15th century, but was greatly disrupted by war and colonisation in the 19th century.

The archaeology map shows that most pre-colonial settlement was along the coast, especially around Whaingaroa harbour, with over 250 recorded archaeological sites along the coast between Port Waikato and the harbour and 151 in the proposed windfarm area. Carbon from a camp fire at Waikorea was dated to between 1400 and 1440. Fragments of stone tools have been found; most of the obsidian recorded came from Tuhua Island, chert from Te Mata and adzes of metasomatised argillite from Marlborough. Obsidian also came from Taupō and Coromandel and its distribution suggests transport over land, more than by river.

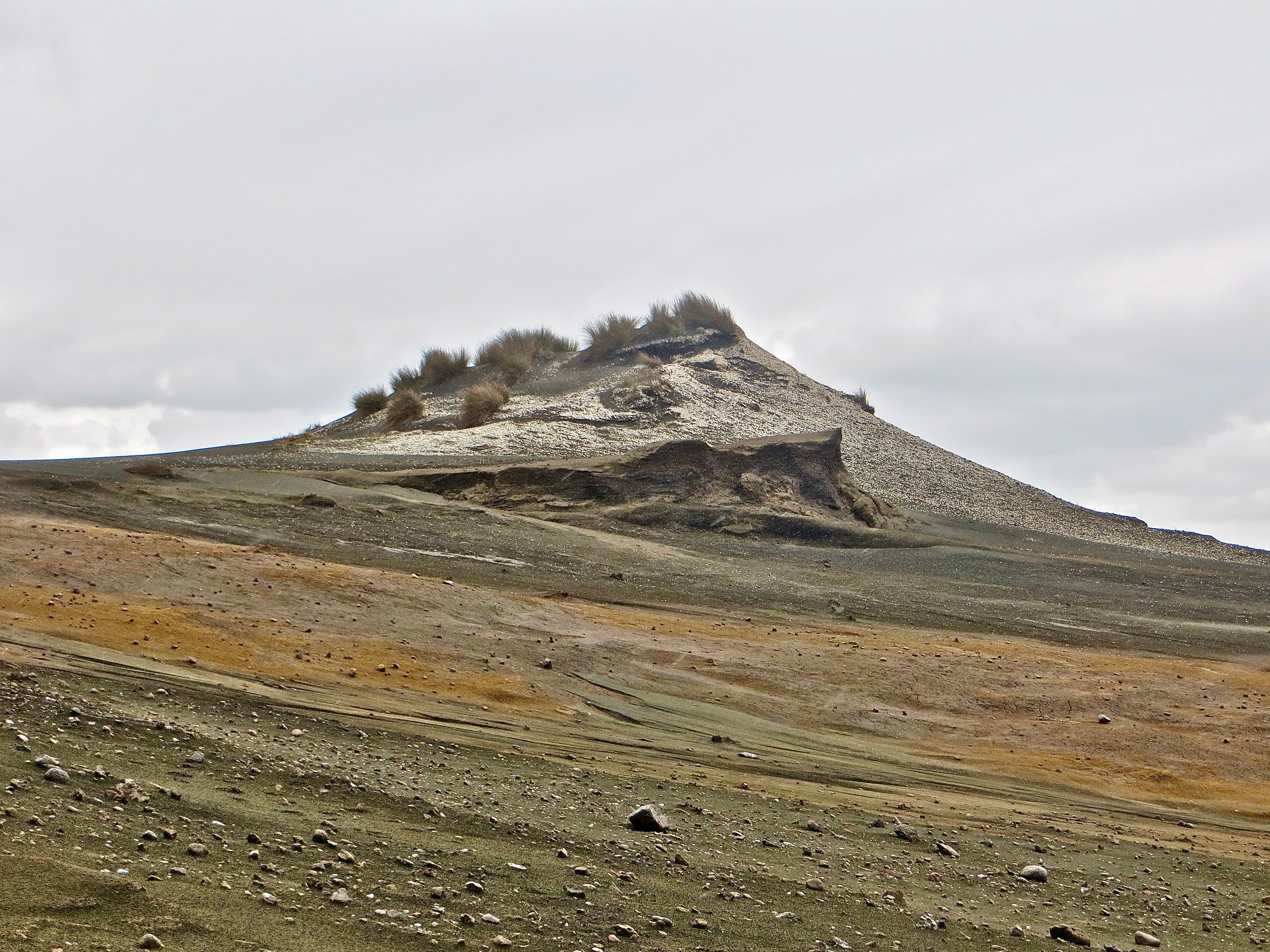
A closer view of one of the middens

In Māori tradition the Tainui waka sailed down the west coast from Manukau, where Poututeka, son of the leader of Tainui Hoturoa, was left behind, along with his son Hapopo. Their descendants, Ngati Pou, were defeated at Whakatiwai on the Firth of Thames and then settled in the Whangape – Te Ākau area.

The name "Te Ākau" translates as "beach" (of which there are several on this coast), but doesn't seem to have been used to describe this area until a report in 1862. Prior to that, only Rangikahu, in the Waimai valley, a little to the north of Te Ākau, was shown on maps and no mention was made of Te Ākau when the Bishop of New Zealand walked down the coast in 1855. By the time of an 1883 trip through Te Ākau, Rangikahu was only a block of the station.

Later history was investigated by a Te Ākau Commission in 1904. It reported that Ngāti Tāhinga were the original owners of Te Ākau Block, but Ngāti Koata acquired a right to a portion, until Waikato defeated Ngāti Koata. In 1817 Ngāti Koata were again attacked and about half fled to conquer both sides of Cook Strait. The other half (since called Tainui) went to Matakitaki, until Hongi Hika's 1822 musket war. Ngāti Māhanga then occupied Horea, though allowing some Tainui to live there, possibly because otherwise Waikato would have taken the land, or possibly as vassals. In 1849 C. W. Ligar, the Surveyor-General, paid £50 to Ngāti Mahuta. A 2011 Waitangi Tribunal report reached much the same conclusion as in 1904, saying, "The resulting payment to Te Wherowhero and Ngati Mahuta does not seem have subsequently been regarded by the Crown as a valid sale."

=== New Zealand Wars ===
Te Ākau was confiscated in 1863. In 1866 a map, showing about 158,600 acres (extending inland to Whangape Lake) claimed by Ngatitahinga and Tainui, was produced in Court. The Court decided there were 77 'loyal' and 44 'rebel' owners (possibly the source of an 1870 return showing 133 of Ngatitahinga and Tainui living in the area between Port Waikato and Raglan. It also showed 108 of Tainui, Te Paitoka, Ngatitekore and Ngatikoata living at Horea). Thus 94,668 acres were returned and 63,932 acres were kept by the Crown. A later survey reduced the area to 90,360 acres. On 23 October 1874, a grant was made to 88 of Ngatitahinga, Tainui and Ngati Mahuta. On a raid to Taranaki prisoners had been brought back as Taurekarekas or slaves. Even when freed, many remained. After confiscation chiefs entered them on the 'loyal' list to increase the area of land returned. Some were displeased when they claimed their share.

In 1894 Te Ākau was divided into 3 pieces. In 1903 an Assessment Court valued the Te Ākau estate at £100,967. The 1904 evidence is still disputed. The report on the windfarm said Ngaati Tahinga have extensive interests from Port Waikato to the Tauterei Stream and Tainui Awhiro south from there, but also claiming interests north of the stream, as "hapu traditionally did not have immutable boundaries, but that their interests were at places permeable and overlapped with neighbours, particularly where they're closely related". The Waitangi Tribunal is yet to report.

=== Mission station ===
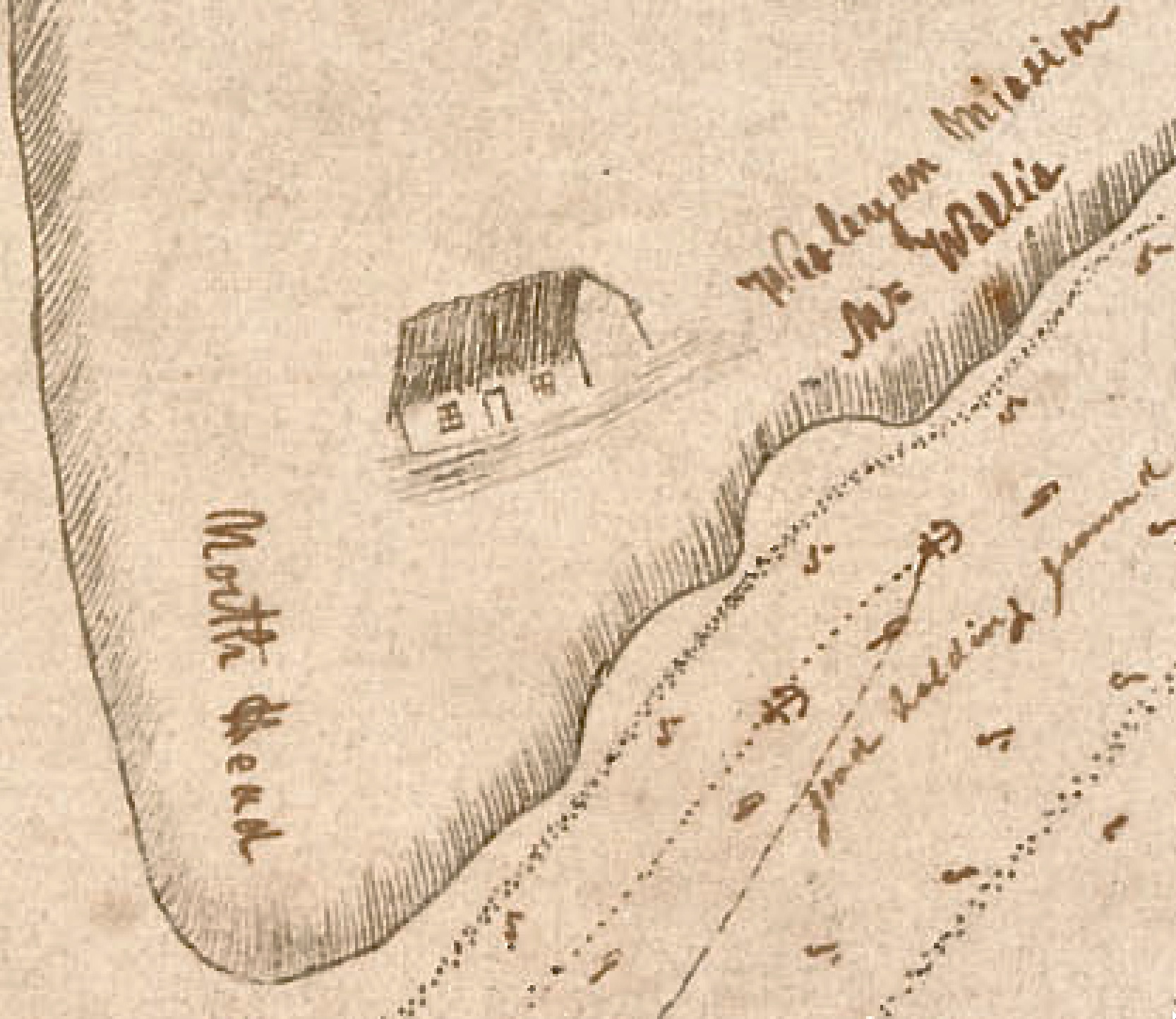
Detail from Whaingaroa Harbour sketch drawn by Captain Thomas Wing January 1836

Christianity spread to this area after 1828, due to missionary work in the north, and release of slaves taken north after the Musket Wars, some of whom returned to their former homes. James and Mary Wallis started a mission station at Te Horea in 1835, but left it in 1836, due to a dispute with the Anglican Church.

=== Cattle and sheep station ===
In 1868, after the disruption of the invasion of the Waikato and confiscation, H. C. Young leased the block from Whaingaroa Harbour to Waikato Heads for 27 years from Ngati-Tahinga and Tainui, at £800 a year.

In 1874 a fresh 30-year lease to Canterbury businessmen and politicians, John Studholme and Thomas Russell, saw more bush cleared for grass and new farm buildings at the southern extremity of the station, just above the 1835 mission station site at Te Horea. Merino sheep were brought from Canterbury and 135 bags of grass seed sown. Ownership was transferred to New Zealand Land Association in 1892.

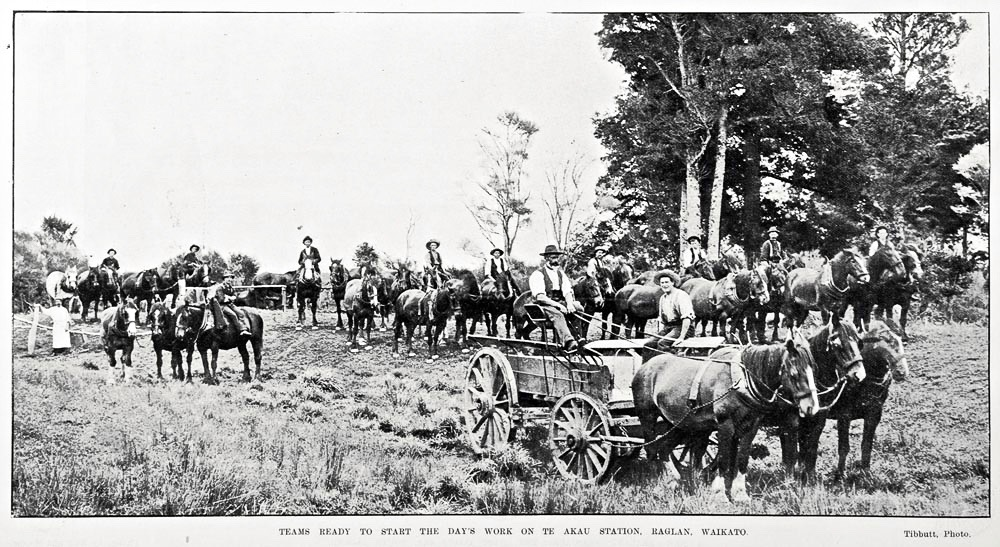
1905 Auckland Weekly News photo

Te Ākau was one of 5 ridings making up Raglan County Council when it was formed in 1876.

Clearing 4,000 acres (1,600 ha) of bush from 1895 allowed 10,000 crossbred ewes to be run for breeding in 1898, in addition to the other 8,000 sheep and 5000 cattle. 500 to 600 fat cattle were sent to Auckland every year, swimming the Waikato and being driven to Auckland. Wool was shipped from the station jetty to Auckland. Sub-stations were opened at Waikato Heads, Ohuka and Mangati. Most of the valleys were good quality land covered with virgin growth and native grasses. In 1898 there were over 17,000 sheep on the station.

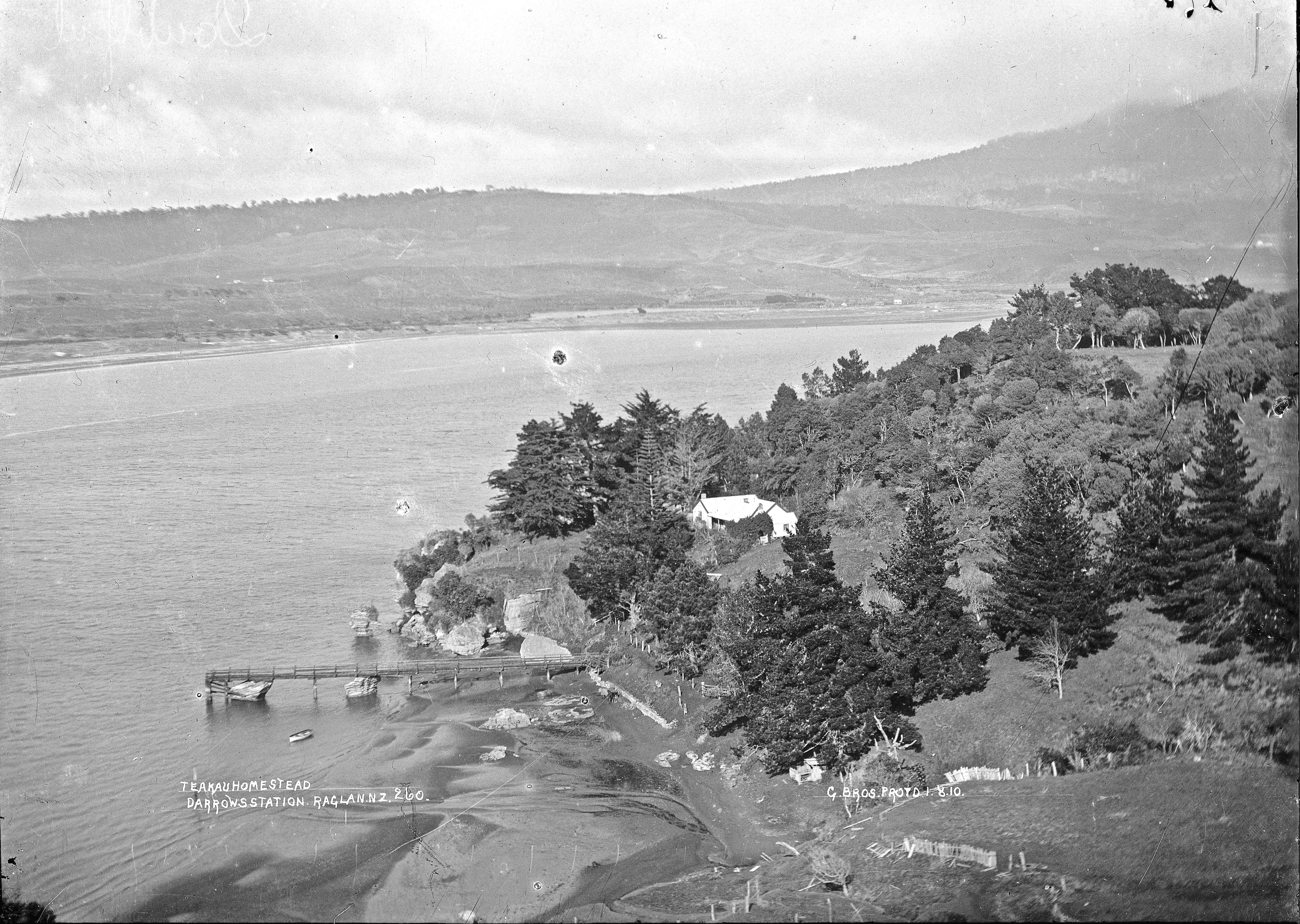
1910 Te Ākau Homestead and jetty

=== Flax mills ===
Sam and Tom Wilson moved to Kerikeri in 1870 had a water-powered flax mill in 1872, when Mrs Wilson was accused of kidnapping slaves. A steam-powered flax mill at Te Aoterei was built in 1889. The mill paid a royalty on the flax, and shipped dressed flax via the station's goods shed to Onehunga. A tramway was built for it in 1906 and shown on the 1909 map.

=== Subdivision ===
The Liberal government passed a Land for Settlements Act in 1894, to promote the break up of large stations. Wars, confiscation and legislation had broken Māori links with the area, an 1883 visitor noting abandoned settlements, so the remaining owners were willing to sell. After the lease ended in 1905, the government started buying the land in 1907. 1076 applications from 455 people for 14,178 acres (5,738 ha), centred around Mangati (a location on the 1909 plan, but now only a road name), went into the ballot (see Auckland Weekly News photo) to purchase in 1909, when government bought another 15,000 acres (6,100 ha). Successful applicants came from all over North Island.

=== Marae ===
There are two local marae: Te Ākau Marae and meeting house; and Weraroa Marae and Kupapa meeting house. Both are meeting grounds for Ngāti Tāhinga and Tainui Hapū, of Waikato Tainui.

In October 2020, the Government committed $2,584,751 from the Provincial Growth Fund to upgrade Te Ākau Marae and 7 other Waikato Tainui marae, creating 40 jobs.

== Infrastructure ==
=== Harbour Landings ===
When Te Ākau was subdivided, water transport was still important, so wharves, and roads to them, were built on Whaingaroa Harbour at Ruakiwi (1914), Mangiti and Te Ākau Wharf, though that is 12 km (7.5 mi) from Te Ākau. Te Ākau Wharf was completed in 1918 with a shed, allowing for vessels of up to a 12 1/2 ft (3.8 m) draught. Presumably they declined as the roads took over the main transport role, though a ferry service still existed in 1938.

=== Roads ===
Road construction started before subdivision, but there was an unexplained delay in 1909 and complaints of the lack of roads were being made in 1910. Work was continuing on several roads in 1914. Waikaretu Rd was finished in 1915.

There are several roads in Te Ākau area unit, including the road through Waingaro on former State Highway 22. The road to Te Ākau Wharf was metalled in the 1930s. The road from Ngāruawāhia to Te Ākau was completely sealed by 1976.

=== Buses ===
In 1921 Bob Gibb of Ngāruawāhia took over the mail run to Waingaro and Te Ākau and cream run to the Ngāruawāhia butter factory, with a solid tyred International. In 1938 Western Highways started a service from Kawhia to Auckland via Makomako, Te Mata, Waingaro and Tuakau (via Highway 22) and back the next day. In 1946 Brosnan Motors started a daily run, leaving Kawhia at 5.45am, arriving at Auckland at 1pm, returning at 2 pm. and back at Kawhia about 9.30pm. In 1950 Brosnan Motors sold the Raglan-Kawhia run to Norman Rankin, who ended it in 1952. Brosnan Motors sold the Raglan-Auckland run to Pavlovich Motors in 1971.

The first bus used on the Auckland-Kawhia run was a 7-seater Studebaker. Then a 10-seater Dodge used by Norman Collett later gave way to a 14-seater Oldsmobile. As the roads improved 18 and 21-seater Diamond T buses took over. Later 40-seaters ran from Raglan to Auckland, until Pavlovich closed the route in 1976.

=== Utilities ===
A post office opened in 1911, with a phone connection from 1913. A private telephone line was added in 1918 to link with a cable laid under the harbour from Raglan. The office was in private houses, such as Mr Wheeler's House, until a post office and telephone exchange were built for the Public Works Department in 1929, about 1 mi (1.6 km) west of the school. In 1987 the post office returned to a general store, which closed in 2000.

Electricity supply to 57 properties was supported by a ballot in 1940 and connected a year later.

A water bore just south of Te Ākau has supplied 24 houses through 9 km (5.6 mi) of pipes since 1994.

=== Windfarm ===
Hauāuru mā Raki Wind Farm was granted consent to build up to 168 wind turbines in 2011, but the project was dropped in 2013.

== Education ==
Te Ākau School opened in 1913, Ruakiwi School in 1917 and Rukuruku School in 1923.

Two school buses have replaced the other schools, leaving only Te Ākau, a 2-classroom, state full primary (years 1–8) school, with a roll of 45 as of July 2026.

== Facilities ==
Te Ākau-Waingaroa Community Centre opened beside the school on 29 March 1980, after council set a special rate area to raise $41,000 in 1976.

It has playing fields, tennis courts, a nine-hole golf course, polo grounds and a 210 m^{2} (2,300 sq ft) timber hall. In 1995 a war memorial plaque was added.

== See also ==
- Kerikeri River
- Tawatahi River
