= Karioitahi Beach =

Beach in New Zealand

- Beach
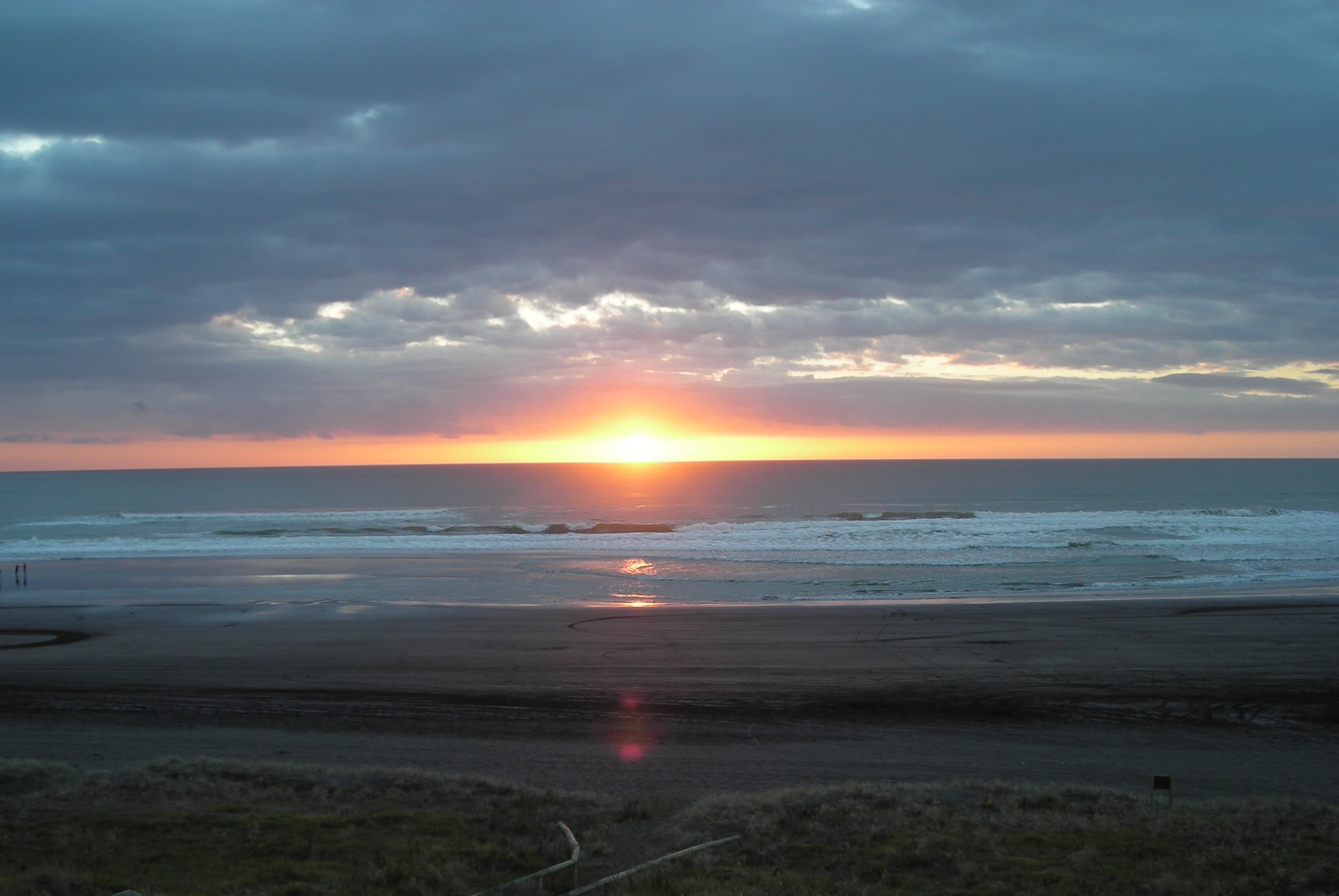
- Sunset at Karioitahi Beach

- Location within New Zealand
- Coordinates: 37.28277°S 174.65403°E
- Location: Auckland Region, New Zealand
- Water bodies: Tasman Sea

Karioitahi Beach is a black sand beach located in the southwest of the Auckland region, on the west coast of New Zealand's North Island. The nearest major town is Waiuku, about 8 km inland.

It is a rugged and windswept environment, popular for activities including surfing, fishing, horse riding, off-road motorcycling and, most notably, paragliding.

== Geology ==
Karioitahi, along with the greater Āwhitu Peninsula was formed by the build up of successive sand dunes, over the course of the past two million years. The iron oxide sand of the beach originated from eroded deposits from Mount Taranaki, and deposits from North Island Volcanic Plateau which have flowed along the Waikato River.

A number of freshwater lakes formed behind Karioitahi Beach in the hollows of these sand dunes, including Lake Otamatearoa, Lake Puketi, Lake Rotoiti and Lake Whatihua.

== Name variations ==
In 1950 Land Information New Zealand designated "Karioitahi" to be the official name, replacing an older spelling "Kariotahi". However, the spelling "Kariotahi" is still occasionally used. The local surf club uses yet another spelling: "Kariaotahi".

== Surf Life Saving Kariaotahi ==
The local surf club, originally named 'Kariaotahi Surf Life Saving Patrol Inc' and later renamed in 2006 to be 'Surf Life Saving Kariaotahi Inc', was founded in 1969.

Patrols operate on all weekends and public holidays from Labour Weekend in October to March or early April, with minimum patrolling hours being 1100 hrs–1600 hrs Oct/Nov/March/April and 1100 hrs–1700 hrs Dec/Jan/February. Weekday patrols (1000 hrs–1800 hrs) are run from mid-December until late January.

SLS Kariaotahi has been recognised with several club and individual awards over its history:

- Voted Best Patrolled Beach in Northern Region for the 2003, 2005, 2006, 2008 and 2012 seasons.
- Senior Lifeguard Dean Lawrence, awarded Surf Life Saving Northern Region, Contribution to Powercraft 2006
- Long standing club member Judith Coe, awarded Surf Life Saving Northern Region, Volunteer of the Year 2006
- Senior Lifeguard Mike Lawrence, awarded Surf Life Saving Northern Region, Surf Lifeguard of the Year and finalist Surf Life Saving New Zealand Surf Lifeguard of the Year 2006
- Senior Lifeguard Chris Parker was awarded Surf Life Saving New Zealand Rescue Of The Year and Northern Regional Lifeguard of the Year for the 2009/10 season.
- Surf Life Saving Northern Region and Surf Life Saving New Zealand Rescue of the Month Winner, February 2011
- Surf Life Saving Northern Region and Surf Life Saving New Zealand Rescue of the Month Winner, Winter/November 2011
- Surf Life Saving Northern Region Rescue of the Month Winner, April 2012

=== Surf sports ===
SLS Kariaotahi used to be identified at competitions by an orange and chocolate-brown quarter-cap but has since adopted the colours of red, white and black which is in line with other sports teams from the region, such as the Counties Manukau rugby union team.

SLS Kariaotahi lifeguards actively compete in canoe racing and IRB racing, which are team events. Both disciplines produced medal-winning performances at the 2011 Northern Region District Championships held at Ruakaka.

== Paragliding ==
The southern end of the beach and cliff, known as Maioro, is commonly used for by local paragliding schools for training beginner pilots. Qualified paraglider pilots are advised against flying in the area, thus leaving it safe and clear for beginners.
