= Te Uku =

Settlement in Waikato, New Zealand

- Village
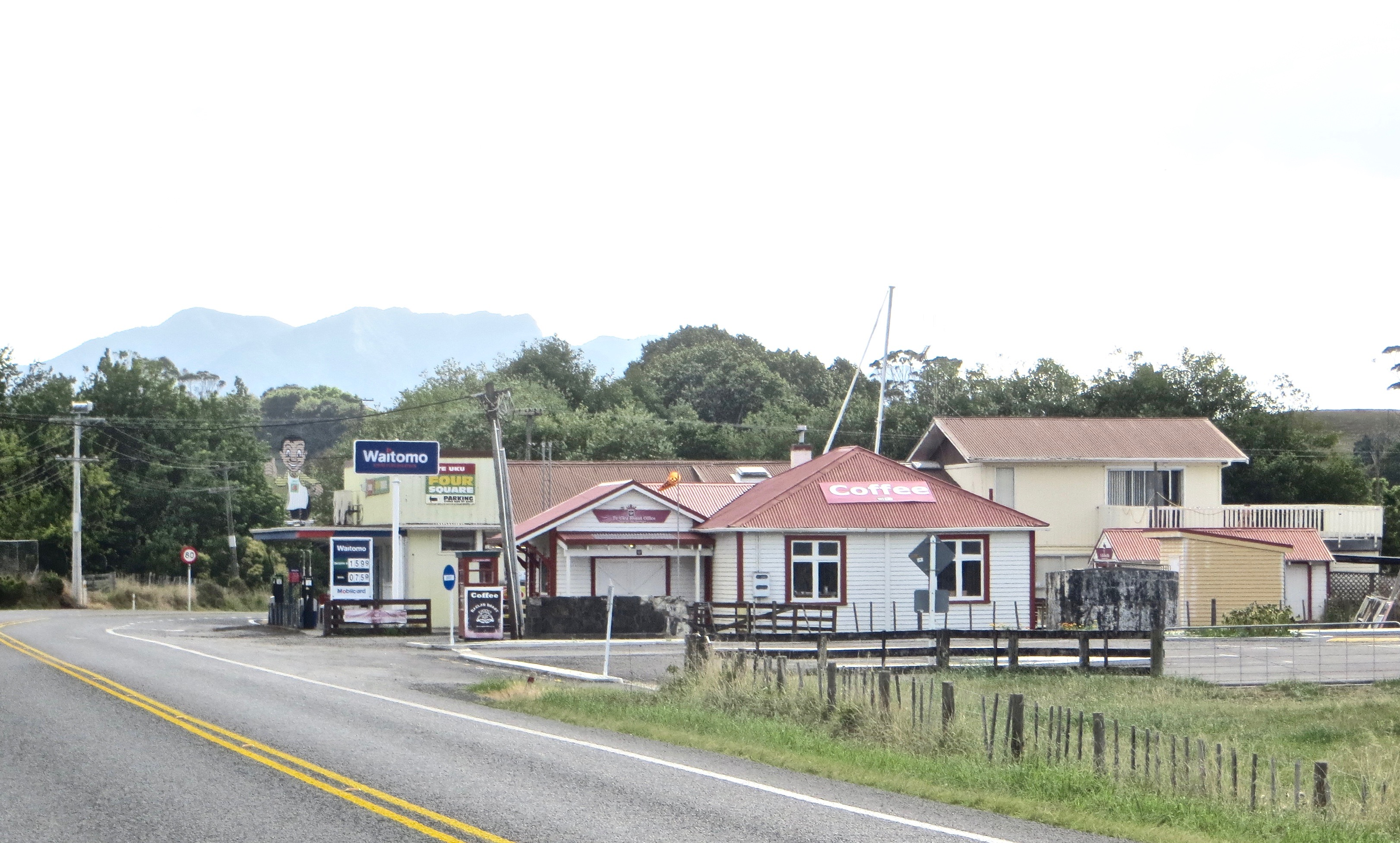
- Te Uku Four Square and Roast Office with Mount Karioi in the background
- Interactive map of Te Uku
- Coordinates: 37°49′45″S 174°57′24″E
- Country: New Zealand
- Region: Waikato
- District: Waikato District
- Wards: Whāingaroa General Ward; Tai Runga Takiwaa Maaori Ward
- Community Board: Raglan Community Board (from October 2022)
- Electorates: Taranaki-King Country; Hauraki-Waikato (Māori)

Government
  - Territorial Authority: Waikato District Council
  - Regional council: Waikato Regional Council
  - Mayor of Waikato: Aksel Bech
  - Taranaki-King Country MP: Barbara Kuriger
  - Hauraki-Waikato MP: Hana-Rawhiti Maipi-Clarke

Area
  - Territorial: 42.65 km^{2} (16.47 sq mi)
- Elevation: 40 m (130 ft)

Population (2023 Census)
  - Territorial: 348
  - Density: 8.16/km^{2} (21.1/sq mi)
- Time zone: UTC+12 (NZST)
  - Summer (DST): UTC+13 (NZDT)

Te Uku is a small, mainly farming, settlement on SH23 in the North Island of New Zealand, located 34 kilometres (21 miles) from Hamilton and 11 km (6.8 mi) from Raglan. It has a 4-Square shop, church, coffee stall and art gallery, filling station, hall, school and Xtreme Zero Waste recycle bins.

Apart from a statistical area which also covers several other settlements, Te Uku has no defined boundaries. Until Te Uku Post Office opened in 1894, Te Uku was usually referred to as Waitetuna, a name now used for another small settlement 8 km (5.0 mi) to the east.

The name is said to be derived from a clay hill in the district. However, 'uku' also translates to a flat-fish, skate.

== Demographics ==
Te Uku settlement and its surrounds cover 42.65 km^{2} (16.47 sq mi). It is part of the larger Te Uku statistical area.

Historical population for Te Uku and surrounds
Year	Pop.	±% p.a.
2006	201	—
2013	249	+3.11%
2018	264	+1.18%
2023	348	+5.68%

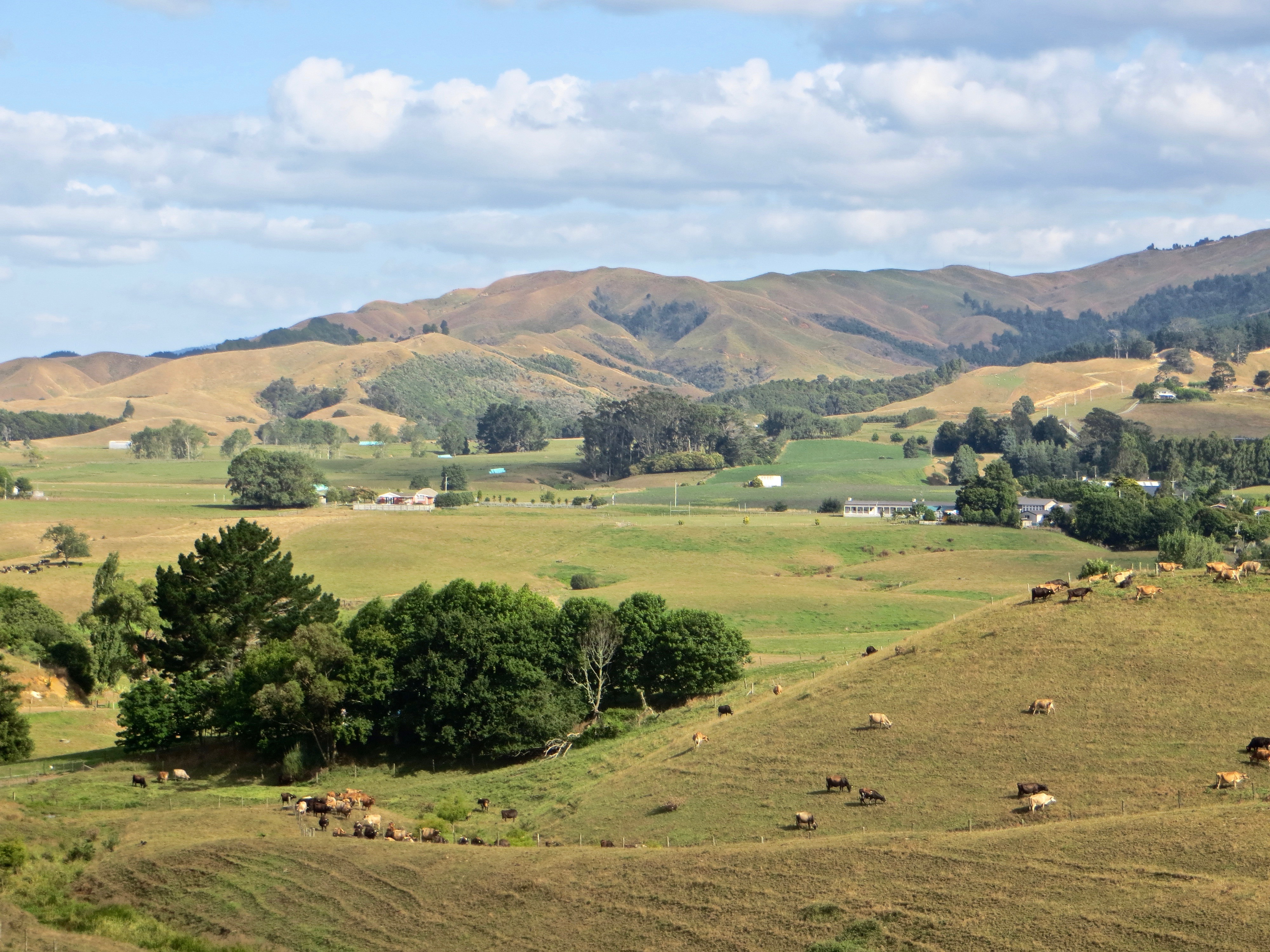
Te Uku from Hauroto Bay Rd – looking south to Surfside Church, school, store and Wharauroa Plateau

Te Uku had a population of 348 in the 2023 New Zealand census, an increase of 84 people (31.8%) since the 2018 census, and an increase of 99 people (39.8%) since the 2013 census. There were 180 males, 168 females and 3 people of other genders in 111 dwellings. 2.6% of people identified as LGBTIQ+. There were 81 people (23.3%) aged under 15 years, 54 (15.5%) aged 15 to 29, 165 (47.4%) aged 30 to 64, and 48 (13.8%) aged 65 or older.

People could identify as more than one ethnicity. The results were 91.4% European (Pākehā); 18.1% Māori; 2.6% Pasifika; 1.7% Asian; 2.6% Middle Eastern, Latin American and African New Zealanders (MELAA); and 1.7% other, which includes people giving their ethnicity as "New Zealander". English was spoken by 97.4%, Māori language by 6.0%, and other languages by 9.5%. No language could be spoken by 2.6% (e.g. too young to talk). The percentage of people born overseas was 17.2, compared with 28.8% nationally.

Religious affiliations were 19.8% Christian, 1.7% Hindu, and 0.9% Islam. People who answered that they had no religion were 65.5%, and 10.3% of people did not answer the census question.

Of those at least 15 years old, 75 (28.1%) people had a bachelor's or higher degree, 132 (49.4%) had a post-high school certificate or diploma, and 60 (22.5%) people exclusively held high school qualifications. 36 people (13.5%) earned over $100,000 compared to 12.1% nationally. The employment status of those at least 15 was that 141 (52.8%) people were employed full-time, 63 (23.6%) were part-time, and 3 (1.1%) were unemployed.

=== Te Uku statistical areas ===
Until the 2023 census, Te Uku statistical area covered all of Waikato District south of Whaingaroa Harbour, with the exception of Raglan, stretching from Waitetuna, through Okete, Kauroa and Te Mata to the coast at Ruapuke and Aotea Harbour. In 2023, the statistical area was split into Te Uku and Whale Bay, which cover 546.57 km^{2} (211.03 sq mi) and had an estimated population of 3,040 as of June 2025, with a population density of 5.6 people per km^{2}.

Historical population for the statistical areas
Year	Pop.	±% p.a.
2006	2,028	—
2013	2,226	+1.34%
2018	2,694	+3.89%
2023	2,901	+1.49%
The 2006 population is for a larger area of 549.67 km^{2}. Source:

Te Uku statistical areas had a population of 2,901 in the 2023 New Zealand census, an increase of 207 people (7.7%) since the 2018 census, and an increase of 675 people (30.3%) since the 2013 census. There were 1,440 males, 1,452 females and 9 people of other genders in 1,032 dwellings. 2.9% of people identified as LGBTIQ+. There were 615 people (21.2%) aged under 15 years, 429 (14.8%) aged 15 to 29, 1,479 (51.0%) aged 30 to 64, and 381 (13.1%) aged 65 or older.

People could identify as more than one ethnicity. The results were 87.4% European (Pākehā); 23.5% Māori; 2.3% Pasifika; 2.1% Asian; 1.3% Middle Eastern, Latin American and African New Zealanders (MELAA); and 2.1% other, which includes people giving their ethnicity as "New Zealander". English was spoken by 97.1%, Māori language by 6.5%, Samoan by 0.2%, and other languages by 9.6%. No language could be spoken by 2.5% (e.g. too young to talk). New Zealand Sign Language was known by 0.7%. The percentage of people born overseas was 19.4, compared with 28.8% nationally.

Religious affiliations were 22.0% Christian, 0.5% Hindu, 0.1% Islam, 0.7% Māori religious beliefs, 0.6% Buddhist, 0.7% New Age, 0.1% Jewish, and 0.8% other religions. People who answered that they had no religion were 66.9%, and 7.8% of people did not answer the census question.

Of those at least 15 years old, 633 (27.7%) people had a bachelor's or higher degree, 1,182 (51.7%) had a post-high school certificate or diploma, and 471 (20.6%) people exclusively held high school qualifications. 300 people (13.1%) earned over $100,000 compared to 12.1% nationally. The employment status of those at least 15 was that 1,143 (50.0%) people were employed full-time, 417 (18.2%) were part-time, and 51 (2.2%) were unemployed.

Individual statistical areas
Name	Area (km^{2})	Population	Density (per km^{2})	Dwellings	Median age	Median income
Te Uku	500.15	1,881	3.8	657	40.7 years	$39,800
Whale Bay	46.42	1,020	22.0	375	41.0 years	$35,200
New Zealand					38.1 years	$41,500

== Geology ==
The village lies in the Matakotea valley, which is a tributary of the Waitetuna River. Most rocks in the area are volcanic. The village, and most of the land to the west, is on Hamilton Ash; a 350,000 year old, strongly weathered, mainly yellow-brown, clay-rich, airfall tephra, of rhyolitic and andesitic composition, which includes corroded quartz crystals, weathered hornblende and augite, halloysite nodules, and some manganese. The hills to the north are of Okete Volcanics. The vertical offsets of the Vanhoutte, Mangawhero and Mangakino Faults reach a maximum of over 250 m (820 ft) near Te Uku trig. The hills to the south of the fault line are of Coleman and Waiharakeke Conglomerates and Puti and Waikorea Siltstones, all of Puaroan age (about 150 million years ago), with 2 million year old Okete Volcanics forming the highest points.

== History ==
Pollen analysis in the sediments of the Waitetuna arm of the harbour shows that the original vegetation was kahikatea on the flats, and a mixed podocarp-hardwood forest on the slopes, with tōtara, maire, mataī, rimu, rātā, beech and tree ferns. Kauri was present, but not abundant.

Te Uku is part of the rohe of Ngāti Māhanga. The archaeology map shows that most pre-colonial settlement was around the harbour, with just three sites in the lower Waitetuna valley, and four sites in the Okete valley, only one of which was a pā site.

European settlement began in the 1850s. The Raglan County history said, "On 22 March 1851, eighteen chiefs of Ngati-Mahanga and Ngati-Hourua, headed by William Naylor, sold to Queen Victoria for the sum of £400 (modern equivalent about $50,000), 19,680 acres (7,960 ha) of country bordering on the southern shores of the harbour. The western boundary of the Whaingaroa Block, as it came to be known, began at Putoetoe (the point on which the town of Raglan now stands) and followed the Opotoru Stream inland. Leaving that stream at its junction with the Hutewai, the line ran south beyond Te Mata to a point "marked by a hole dug by the side of the path to Aotea. Here it turned north-eastward to run (again in a straight line) for eight miles through dense forest to meet the Waitetuna River, the last few miles of which formed the eastern boundary."

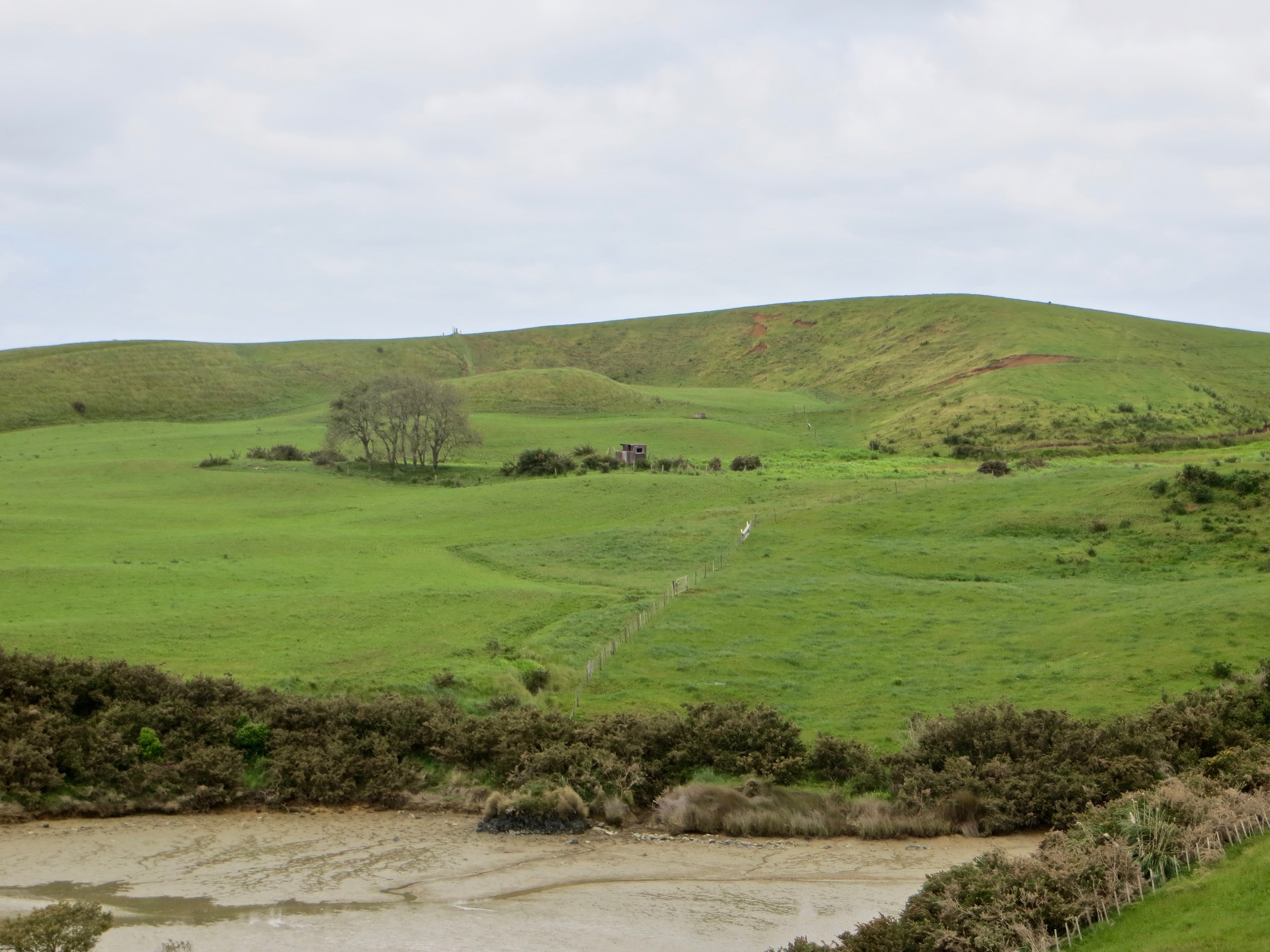
Waitetuna Redoubt site in 2015

In 1852 John and George Moon, walked to Te Uku from New Plymouth, introducing the first sheep, and the first horse-drawn vehicle. In 1856 Abraham Kescel bought 242 acres (98 ha) at Okete and Charles Savage also came from Taranaki. James La Trobe settled in 1857.

Waitetuna Redoubt was built to the south of the Narrows, as part of Colonel Richard Waddy's end of December 1863 expedition to set up a supply line during the invasion of the Waikato. The route was too rugged and it and the redoubt were abandoned, probably before 7 February 1864. It remains as a well preserved earthwork, about 44 m (144 ft) across.

A 1915 guide said, "Te Uku is a small township in Raglan County, 25 mi (40 km) from Frankton by coach, and about 9 mi (14 km) from Raglan, being on the main coach road between Frankton and Raglan. Its principal industries are dairying, flax milling, and timber."

=== Roads ===
There are three through roads serving Te Uku; the main east-west SH23, the road south to Te Mata and Kawhia, and the road north to Waingaro and State Highway 22.

The first road was built in 1863 from Raglan via Okete (Okete Rd remained the main road until 1906, or possibly 1913, or later) to the Waitetuna River. The county history said, "For a dozen years or more before the county was formed (1875), 10 miles of roughly formed dirt road, wide enough to carry horse-drawn drays, linked Raglan township with the Waitetuna River. From there the packhorse route (originally known as the Tikihouhou Track) made by the Army during the Waikato War, wound a tortuous way across the ranges, but it was too narrow, and too steep in parts, to carry vehicles." It became a through road to Hamilton in 1879. It was metalled between 1914 and 1921 and sealing started in 1937, but wasn't completed until 1961.

From the formation of Raglan Town (1868) and Karioi (1870) Highways Boards, road building was paid for by local rates. After the Immigration and Public Works Act of 1870, government also contributed. In 1870 the Karioi Board decided to make a start on Kauroa Rd south to Te Mata. By 1880 it was described as "a more than ordinarily good road", with the bush "felled for some distance on either hand" and "several well cultivated farms". Metal was reported as being spread to Te Mata from Ponds Rd in 1906 and the road was reported as metalled through to Kawhia in 1928.

The road north to Waingaro developed with settlement from 1874. Bridges over the Ohautira and Rautawhairi creeks were tendered in 1887. It was metalled in 1937 and seal completed in 2006.

Dennis trucks were reported as replacing horses and bullock teams from 1922.

=== Railways ===
Te Uku almost got a railway too. In 1923 the Waikato-West Coast railway district was set up under the 1914 Local Railways Act, which enabled cheaper construction of railways. It got a detailed survey done for a 2 ft 6in gauge railway and had a contractor ready to build a line through the Waitetuna valley, past Te Uku School and Okete Falls and along the edge of the harbour to Raglan. However, it was opposed by local MP Alexander Young, the proposed local rate was defeated in an election in 1923 and the Board was wound up in 1928. The voting area included ratepayers who would have gained little from the railway, such as those in Ngāhinapōuri and south of Kawhia Harbour. Generally those areas which would have benefitted from the railway voted for it, the exception being Te Uku.

=== Buses ===
Te Uku is served by the Raglan bus and school buses, but once also had services north and south. The first Hamilton-Raglan coach ran in 1880 and became a service car route about 1916. From March 1922 a two and a half hour, Pakoka Landing to Frankton, via Te Mata, "Silver Trail", bus service started, with a motor launch connection to Kawhia on Fridays. Problems with rough roads and tides caused it to fail. In 1938 Western Highways started a service from Kawhia to Auckland via Makomako, Te Mata, Waingaro and Tuakau (via Highway 22) and back the next day. In 1946 Brosnan Motors started a daily run, leaving Kawhia at 5.45am, arriving at Auckland at 1pm, returning at 2 pm. and back at Kawhia about 9.30pm. In 1950 Brosnan Motors sold the Raglan-Kawhia run to Norman Rankin, who ended it in 1952. Brosnan Motors sold the Raglan-Auckland run to Pavlovich Motors in 1971. The first bus used on the Auckland-Kawhia run was a 7-seater Studebaker. Then a 10-seater Dodge used by Norman Collett later gave way to a 14-seater Oldsmobile. As the roads improved 18 and 21-seater Diamond T buses took over. Later 40-seaters ran from Raglan to Auckland, until Pavlovich closed the route in 1976.

=== Churches ===
On 29 January 1873 Abraham Kescel donated an acre or so of land to the Anglican Church. The church was also used as a school. The church was burnt down about 1880. In 1880 the Wesleyan and Anglican Churches were described as two tiny buildings near the Okete River ford.

In 1872 a Congregational church was built about 30 chains nearer Raglan, on land originally taken up by W. Cogswell. A section of about 3 acres was acquired, running from the road to the top of the hill. It was built by Jim Pearce and Joseph Pretty. A scrub fire about 1904 quickly ran up the hill, and completely demolished the building. A 20 feet high stone cairn was built here in 1971.

2.6 km (1.6 mi) east of Te Uku, St Paul's Anglican church was built in 1906 by Ernest Morris of Morris and Emmett. A Building Inspector said it had to be demolished, because rain water had caused extensive rot and it had begun to fall sideways and nobody should enter while there was any wind movement. A last service was held on Sunday 13 April 1980. Demolition was on 14 January 1981 and a memorial plaque laid in 1982 and dedicated on 20 March 1983. St Paul's Cemetery remains beside the main road.

After the 1904 fire, there seems to have been a gap in Methodist worship until the Memorial Hall was used shortly after it was built in 1919. Arthur Moon married Janet McFarlane, from the Isle of Skye, who had trained as a nurse in Glasgow. They had one son, Keith, who was killed while serving in the R.N.Z.A.F. in World War 2. In 1950, Mrs Moon built the Moon Memorial Methodist Church. Surfside (affiliated with the Assemblies of God) bought it in 2003.

=== Flax mills ===
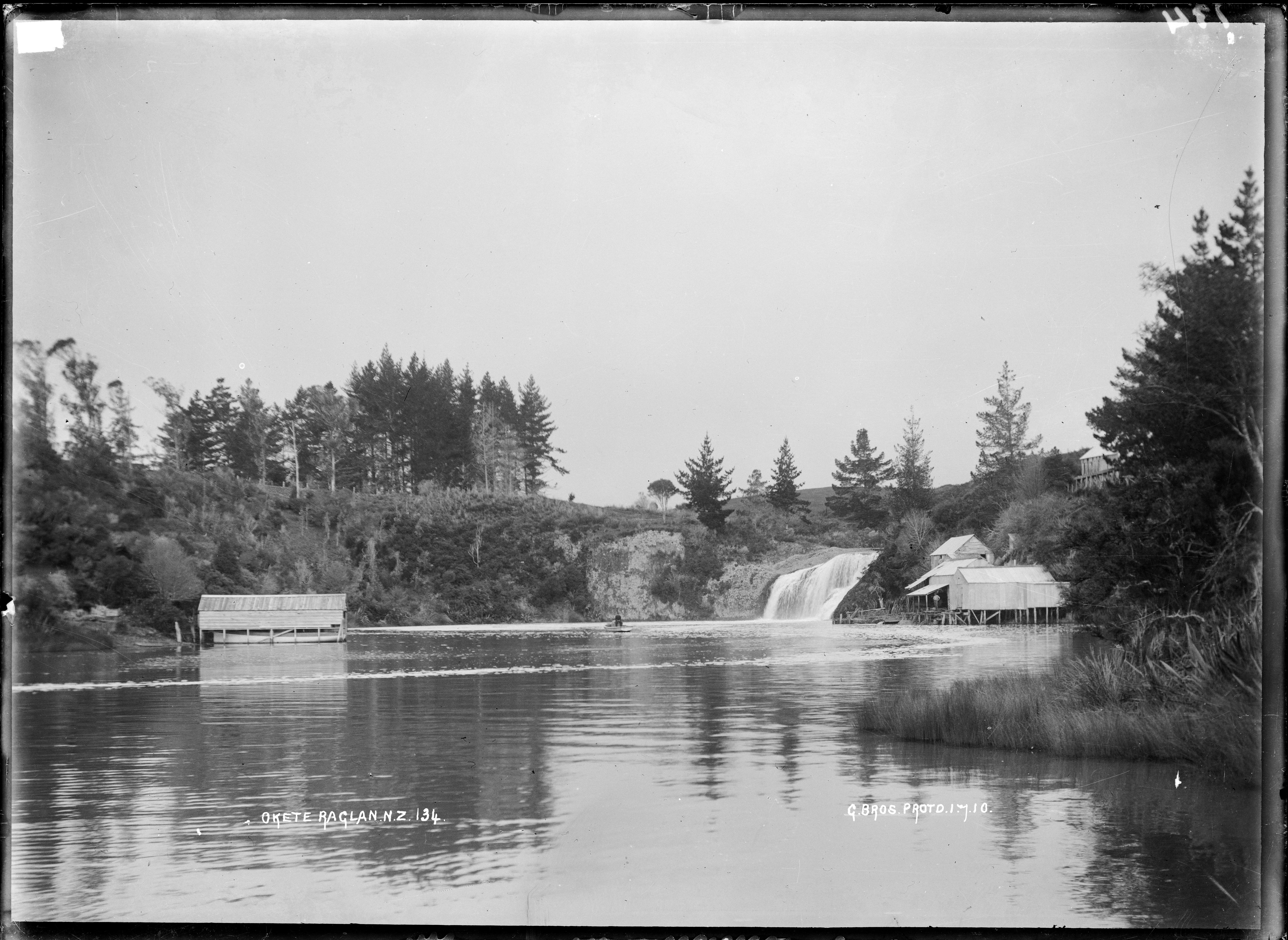
Flax mill at Okete Falls in 1910 Alexander Turnbull Library, Wellington.

In the 19th and early 20th centuries there were many flax mills around Te Uku. The longest lived started about 1868, when Wallis Brothers used a water-wheel to drive a mill at Okete Falls. The overshot wheel was replaced by a pelton wheel in 1902. In 1925, due to shortage of flax, the pelton wheel was attached to a generator and the flax mill closed.

A year later it was reported, "The flax mill belonging to Captain Johnstone is just being completed. This will make the seventh flax mill erected here within about a twelvemonth. These are all in full work, and three others are in preparation. The mills completed and working full time belong to the following gentlemen Messrs Wilson, Moon, Sutton, Wallis, McDonald, Mitchell, and Captain Johnstone. The other mills being erected are by Messrs. Ogilvie, of Auckland, McDonald. and La Trobe."

Two decades later there was a list of "industries along the Raglan and Waipa Road. Five miles from Raglan, we come to the flax-mill of Messrs Wallis just above the beautiful Okete Falls, having abundance of water for the mill. The next mill is that of Mr Wilson, now leased to Messrs Ormiston. A few miles along the flax mill of Mr La Trobe at the junction of the Waipa and Kauroa roads. The next mill is that of Mr Moon, which is not in work just now, but is expected soon to be. On the Hot Springs Road, a short distance from its junction with the Waipa Road, is the flax mill of Mr Cogswell."

As with mills elsewhere in the country, they succumbed to shortage of flax due to fires, drainage and grazing. Little remains; a few parts of Okete mill lie near the falls and its pelton wheel stands outside Raglan museum. Of George Leakey's 1900s mill on the Okete stream, the mill race was, in 1975, still visible "for several 100 yards" below St Paul's cemetery.

=== Memorial Hall ===
The hall was built in 1919 on land donated by Arthur Moon as a memorial to the 1914–18 war. Timber was felled on Mount Karioi, milled at Armstrong's mill at Te Mata, carted by Te Uku farmers and erected by J. Munro of Raglan. Dressing rooms were added later and used for a library, and Plunket room. Apart from dancing, the hall was also used for films, Women's Institute, a garden circle, bowls, badminton and meetings. It was replaced in April 1951 due to borer damage.

=== Quarries ===
Te Uku limeworks opened in the 1930s, just north of Te Uku Landing. Over about 15 years it crushed several thousand tons for agricultural use and driveways, initially with a traction engine and later with electric power.

Okete quarry opened beside Okete Falls in the 1940s. The rock is Basanite, erupted between 2.69 and 1.8 million years ago.

=== Te Uku Landing ===
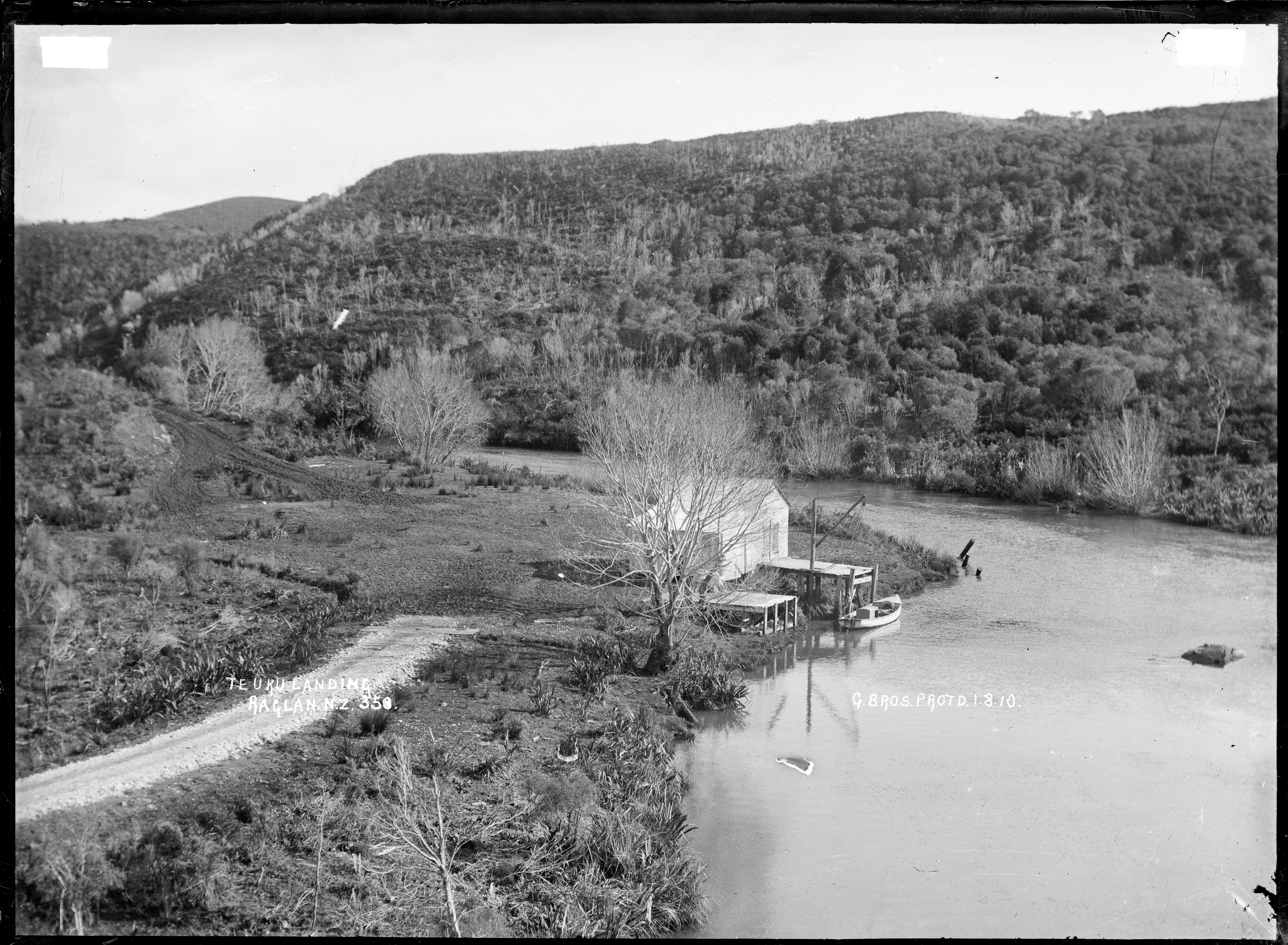
Te Uku Landing, 1910 _{- Photograph taken by Gilmour Brothers. Price, William Archer, 1866–1948 :Collection of post card negatives. Alexander Turnbull Library, Wellington.}

Te Uku Landing is 3.7 km (2.3 mi) from Te Uku, though a 17 acres (6.9 ha) public reserve still exists half a mile closer, which was planned to be the landing before the surveyors realised the difficulty of navigating the rapids. In a 1904 Chronicle, Langley was advertising for cargo for the launch 'Nita', which ran from Raglan to Te Uku every Tuesday. The last auction to lease Te Uku landing reserve (for a term of 14 years) seems to have been in 1918.

=== Sawmills ===
A mill at Ohautira opened in 1943 and closed in the early 1960s. It was still marked on the 1978 map.

=== Saleyards ===
Before Kauroa saleyards were first used on 21 January 1914, sheep and cattle yards had existed at the start of the road to Waingaro. Local farmers formed Kauroa Saleyards Society in 1977, when the yards were threatened with closure, and continue to hold sales.

=== Shops ===
Te Uku store opened in 1924 on land which the Anglican Church had planned to use as a graveyard.

==== Post office ====
Te Uku's first Post Office opened in 1894, about halfway between Te Uku and Waitetuna. It was replaced on the current site, next door to the shop and school, in 1925. The Post Office was among many closed by Richard Prebble on 5 February 1988. It then became a gallery and was renovated to its current coffee bar use, as Te Uku Roast Office, in 2011.

===== Telephone =====
A line connecting Raglan and Hamilton served Te Uku from 1884. A telephone office opened in 1906 and an exchange with 15 subscribers in 1924. Te Uku microwave tower was built in the 1970s and Te Uku exchange was automated in the 1970s. In 2016 the Te Uku cell tower, built under the Rural Broadband Initiative, improved wireless broadband and mobile phone coverage.

=== Electricity ===
Apart from two small 1920s hydro electric schemes, Te Uku was without electricity until 27 September 1935, after which there was a formal switching on ceremony. Connections to other parts of the district were slow, Ruapuke not being connected until 1966. Te Uku windfarm opened in 2011, but there is no direct connection, Te Uku continuing to be supplied from the 11 kV substation on the corner of Ohautira Rd.

=== Historic photos ===
Many photographs were taken for Gilmour Bros, the Raglan store, in 1910. These are on the National Library website –

- Pupils and staff at Te Uku Public School
- St Paul's church
- Mangakino Bridge (compare Google street scene)
- Bridge over the Waitetuna River (compare Google street scene)
- Lynnwood Homestead (replacing nearby Halfway House, which burnt down in 1906)
- Te Uku post office
- Ernest C Moon, postmaster, Te Uku (publicised for writing with his feet)
- Overton, Wallis Rd, Okete Bay
- Copwells Bay, Te Uku
- The Caves, Te Uku

There's also an Auckland Weekly News photo – Flight-Sergeant K. M. Moon, of Te Uku, missing on operations 1943

== Education ==
In 1871 Waitetuna residents agreed to build a school, but an 1872 flood washed away the timber for the scheme. A half-time school and a private school ran for a while. Waitetuna School District was gazetted in 1873, but the Education Rate proved insufficient to pay the teacher and the school closed in 1875.

A new school on donated land opened, with a teacher's residence added in 1877 and an adjacent 11 acres added by the Waste Lands Board in 1878. As early as 1882 a petition requested the school be moved away from the damp hollow, but nothing happened until the main road was diverted through the grounds in 1906.

On 24 August 1903 Waitetuna School changed its name to Te Uku. In August 1908 the present school was established about 800 metres to the east, with one room on another 2 acres of donated land. Inadvertently, an acre of Church land was taken by the school until sold for a post office and store in 1923. A second classroom was added in 1935, a teacher's house in 1941, a concrete play area in 1948, a football paddock leased from 1951, a prefab added in 1954, a lavatory block in 1957, a school pool in 1961 and the Aramiro School building moved here in 1965.

Ohautira Maori School closed in 1969, shortly after the timber mill, and in 1975 another classroom was added. The Ohautira school building was moved to Motumaoho in 1969.

Te Uku School is now a co-educational state primary school, with a roll of 128 as of July 2026.

Other primary schools in the area are at Te Mata and Waitetuna, and there is a composite school at Raglan.

== Okete ==
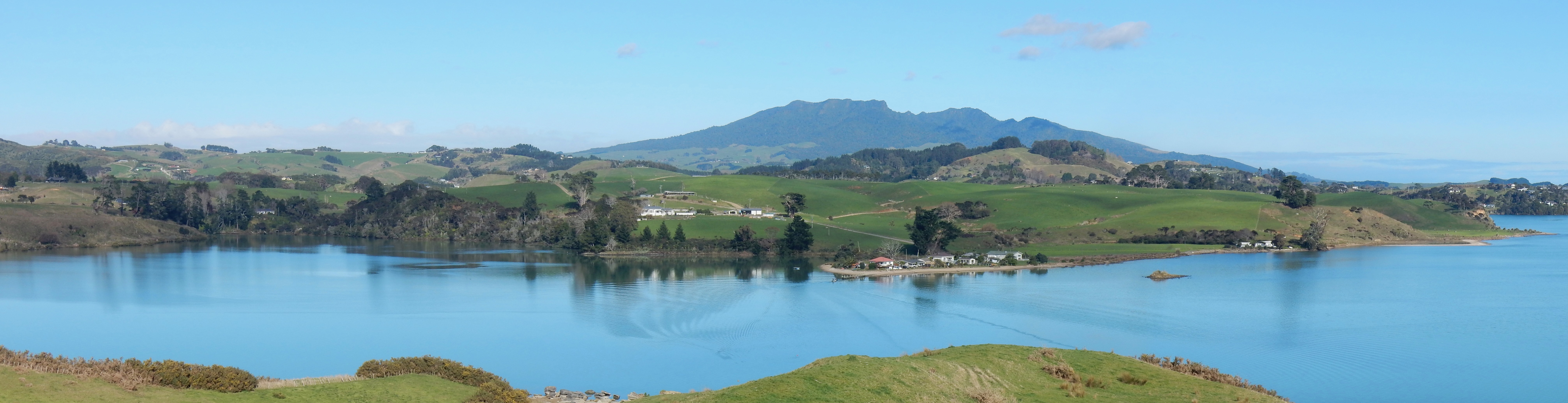
Okete Bay, Howdenville, Motutara Island and Mt Karioi

Okete is on the north-west side of Te Uku. Four Okete pā sites are listed in the District Plan. Okete Methodist Church opened in 1872 and by 1874 the church was also being used as a school. As mentioned above, a flax mill started about 1868 and another burnt down in 1885. Okete Post Office burnt down in 1904 and the same year, the church also burnt down. It was replaced in 1905. In 1886 Okete's population was 39. In 1906 it was 26. The 2013 population of meshblocks 0860500 and 0860600 was 228. Okete Road was a mud road until 1921, when metalling began. In 2011 the road south of Okete Stream was straightened and sealed. About 2 km (1.2 mi) remains as a gravel road. The small settlement of Howdenville was built at the entrance to Okete Bay, on land sold by the Wallis family to Les Howden, a Hamilton jeweller. The former quarry beside Okete Falls has been planted with native trees.
