= Te Mata, Waikato District =

Te Mata
- Village
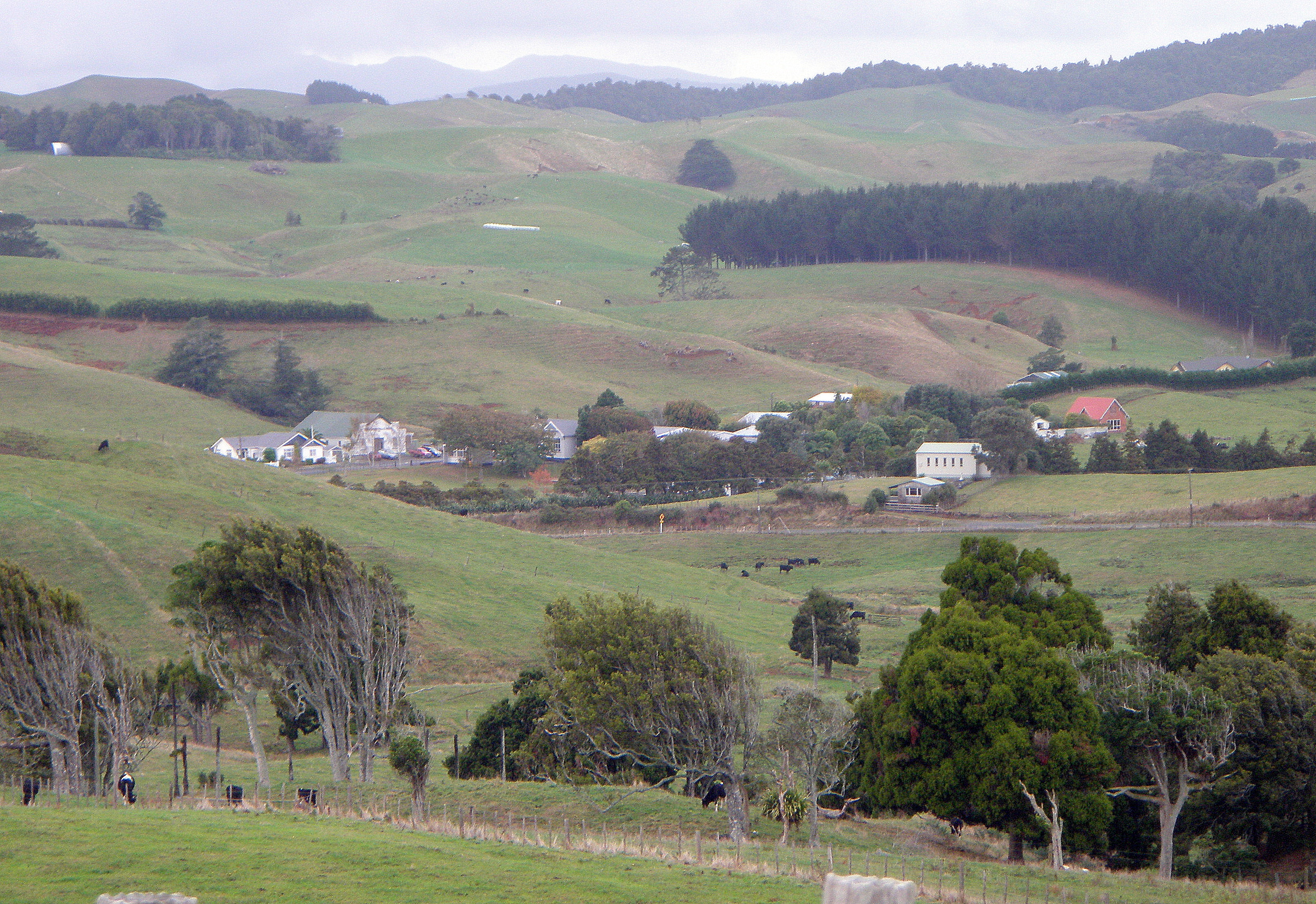
- Te Mata in 2010, viewed from the west, with Pirongia in the background. The 1905 hall is towards the left.

- Location within New Zealand
- Coordinates: 37°53′S 174°52′E
- Country: New Zealand
- Region: Waikato region
- District: Waikato District
- Wards: Whāingaroa General Ward; Tai Runga Takiwaa Maaori Ward
- Community Board: Raglan Community Board (from October 2022)
- Electorates: Taranaki-King Country; Hauraki-Waikato (Māori)

Government
  - Territorial Authority: Waikato District Council
  - Regional council: Waikato Regional Council
  - Mayor of Waikato: Aksel Bech
  - Taranaki-King Country MP: Barbara Kuriger
  - Hauraki-Waikato MP: Hana-Rawhiti Maipi-Clarke

Area
  - Territorial: 20.16 km^{2} (7.78 sq mi)
- Elevation: 150 m (490 ft)

Population (2023 Census)
  - Territorial: 174
  - Density: 8.63/km^{2} (22.4/sq mi)
- Time zone: UTC+12 (NZST)
  - Summer (DST): UTC+13 (NZDT)

Te Mata is a small settlement 47 km (29 mi) from Hamilton and 15 km (9.3 mi) from Raglan.

== Demographics ==
Te Mata is in an area which extends from Te Mata to Pakoka Landing and covers 20.16 km^{2} (7.78 sq mi). The area is part of the larger Te Uku statistical area.

Historical population for Te Mata and surrounds
Year	Pop.	±% p.a.
2006	99	—
2013	135	+4.53%
2018	186	+6.62%
2023	174	−1.32%

Te Mata had a population of 174 in the 2023 New Zealand census, a decrease of 12 people (−6.5%) since the 2018 census, and an increase of 39 people (28.9%) since the 2013 census. There were 75 males and 96 females in 57 dwellings. 3.4% of people identified as LGBTIQ+. The median age was 37.8 years (compared with 38.1 years nationally). There were 42 people (24.1%) aged under 15 years, 27 (15.5%) aged 15 to 29, 81 (46.6%) aged 30 to 64, and 18 (10.3%) aged 65 or older.

People could identify as more than one ethnicity. The results were 91.4% European (Pākehā), 22.4% Māori, 1.7% Asian, and 3.4% other, which includes people giving their ethnicity as "New Zealander". English was spoken by 100.0%, Māori language by 3.4%, and other languages by 6.9%. The percentage of people born overseas was 12.1, compared with 28.8% nationally.

Religious affiliations were 12.1% Christian, 3.4% Māori religious beliefs, 1.7% Buddhist, and 1.7% other religions. People who answered that they had no religion were 74.1%, and 8.6% of people did not answer the census question.

Of those at least 15 years old, 30 (22.7%) people had a bachelor's or higher degree, 81 (61.4%) had a post-high school certificate or diploma, and 24 (18.2%) people exclusively held high school qualifications. The median income was $39,100, compared with $41,500 nationally. 12 people (9.1%) earned over $100,000 compared to 12.1% nationally. The employment status of those at least 15 was that 66 (50.0%) people were employed full-time and 24 (18.2%) were part-time.

== Geology ==
The village lies in the Te Mata Stream valley, which is the main tributary of the Opotoru River. Nearly all the rocks in the area are volcanic, the exception being chert (see History), though it is not marked on the geological map. The village is on Okete Volcanics, on a flat area on formed by volcanic damming, with Karioi Volcanics on the higher land immediately to the west. Some basaltic scoria includes iron oxide bands with up to 51.74% iron content.

== History ==
Te Mata was part of the rohe of Ngāti Māhanga. Until the early twentieth century the area was largely covered in kahikatea bush. The archaeology map shows only one site near the present village, the great bulk of sites being near the coast. However, that one site, just north of the village, was of importance for its chert and the origin of the name, Te Mata, which translates as chert, flint or obsidian. Chert tools from the area have been identified at 18 sites from Manukau South Head to Awakino.

European settlement began in the 1850s. The Raglan County history said, "On 22 March 1851, eighteen chiefs of Ngati-Mahanga and Ngati-Hourua, headed by William Naylor, sold to Queen Victoria for the sum of £400 (modern equivalent about $50,000)", 19,680 acres (7,960 ha) of country bordering on the southern shores of the harbour. The western boundary of the Whaingaroa Block, as it came to be known, began at Putoetoe (the point on which the town of Raglan now stands) and followed the Opotoru Stream inland. Leaving that stream at its junction with the Hutewai, the line ran south beyond Te Mata to a point "marked by a hole dug by the side of the path to Aotea. Here it turned north-eastward to run (again in a straight line) for eight miles through dense forest to meet the Waitetuna River, the last few miles of which formed the eastern boundary."

An 1855 traveller through Pukerangi (2 mi (3.2 km) north of Te Mata) wrote, "We found some English settlers in the open spaces, formerly cleared by the natives, as we walked through the forest: one family of the name of McArthur, another Phillips from Bath, another Day. All seemed pleased with the land, which, though small in quantity, was very good in quality. We stopped half-an-hour after sunset at one of these "saltus," called Mata, where Rota and our lads had proceeded; and pitched our tent in a beautiful spot, where I expect to see, in five years' time, a fair population, and perhaps a Church."

However, settlement wasn't that fast; Raglan Old Settlers, 1940 booklet said, "As nearly as can be ascertained the first settlers in Te Mata were the Hutchisons, Kinnairds and Barretts; about 1857 it is believed they came. Following them came Rollos, J. Mitchell, Bunting, Stebbins, Sherlocks and Wilsons. They had their homes in close proximity in the centre of the district. A narrow track through standing bush formed their outlet to the Raglan township." A store was opened in 1896, Te Mata Co-op. Dairy Co. started in 1902,. Te Mata Hall and a new school were built in 1905.

A 1915 guide said, "Te Mata is a small township in Raglan County, 25 miles from Frankton by coach, and about nine miles south of Raglan, on the Raglan-Kawhia Road. It is chiefly a farming and grazing district." The only stingray fatality recorded in New Zealand occurred at Te Mata in 1938, when 18-year old Jessie Merle Laing was struck in the chest.

=== Transport ===
Te Mata is 8.5 km (5.3 mi) south of SH23, on the road which continues south to a junction with SH31, near Kawhia. It is sealed from SH23 to Phillips Rd, 7 km (4.3 mi) south of Te Mata, as is Ruapuke Rd. Otherwise, most roads are gravel, the transport system having developed slowly.

==== Roads ====
When the land was bought in 1855, the Commissioner wrote, "The land is of good quality, having a Native track leading through it from the harbour, capable of forming a road by deviating slightly inland." Those tracks were later supplemented by settlers' tracks, but it wasn't until the formation of Raglan Town (1868) and Karioi (1870) Highways Boards that road building was paid for by local rates. After the Immigration and Public Works Act of 1870, government also contributed.

Waimaori Rd, now a little used gravel road, was first to be started. An 1864 track ran from Waitomotomo to Waimaori, extended about 1882 by settlers Ward and Jackson as a bullock road from the bridge at Waimaori and later extended up Waimaori Hill to the top of the coastal hills and down Mill Hill to Ruapuke Beach.

The state of transport in 1871 is illustrated by a description of the Saunders family arrival. It says they took a boat from Raglan to Bridle Creek, then a bullock dray to Kauroa, pack horses to Te Mata and then had to widen the track to Te Hutewai to get their packs through. At its 2 January 1872 meeting, the Karioi Board decided to call for tenders to form the Te Mata-Raglan road in the worst places.

On 14 November 1870 the Board decided the bridge (possibly built in the late 1850s) over the Opotoru on the Raglan-Aotea road (Maungatawhiri Rd) was nearly worn out and that a bridge was needed for the new Aotea-Waitetuna road (Kauroa Rd), about 1/2 mi (0.80 km) upstream; now the only bridge. The Board was anxious to make one bridge serve both roads, but 2 were built. On 14 August 1872 it was decided to build a new bridge of pūriri. The present 1960s bridge is concrete.

By 1880 Te Mata Rd was described as "a more than ordinarily good road", with the bush "felled for some distance on either hand" and "several well cultivated farms".

By 1884 7 mi (11 km) of the road to Kawhia had been completed to Pakoka. Public Works Estimates were then made to extend the road over Pakoka Bridge in 1884, 1897, 1902, 1910, 1912, 1913, 1914, and 1918.

==== Buses ====
Te Mata now only has school buses, but once had public services. From March 1922 a two and a half hour, Pakoka Landing to Frankton, via Te Mata, "Silver Trail", bus service started, with a motor launch connection to Kawhia on Fridays. Problems with rough roads and tides caused it to fail. In 1938 a Western Highways bus ran from Kawhia to Auckland via Makomako, Te Mata, Waingaro and Tuakau and back the next day. In 1946 Brosnan Motors started a daily run, leaving Kawhia at 5.45am, arriving at Auckland at 1pm, returning at 2 pm. and back at Kawhia about 9.30pm. In 1950 Brosnan Motors sold the Raglan-Kawhia run to Norman Rankin, who ended it in 1952. Brosnan Motors sold the Raglan-Auckland run to Pavlovich Motors in 1971 but Jim continues to run the local school buses. The first bus used on the Auckland-Kawhia run was a 7-seater Studebaker. Then a 10-seater Dodge used by Norman Collett later gave way to a 14-seater Oldsmobile. As the roads improved 18 and 21-seater Diamond T buses took over. Now 40-seaters run from Raglan to Auckland. Pavlovich ended the Raglan-Auckland service in 1976.

In the early years of motor buses, some Hamilton-Raglan buses ran via Te Mata, but were replaced by a mail van. From 1 October 1950 until after 1983, Robertsons had a 9am bus to Raglan, which left mail at Te Uku en route. Rural mail was sorted in Raglan and this service travelled to Te Mata via Maungatawhiri, and then through Kauroa, on to Aramiro and back to Raglan via Okete, returning to Hamilton at 3pm.

=== Churches ===
All Saints Anglican Church was designed by Thomas Cray and cost £800, mainly raised by Te Mata Ladies Guild. It was dedicated by the Bishop of Waikato in 1928. It was sold in 2013, though had been privately owned before that. The Catholic Church of the Holy Redeemer in Te Mata was built of rimu and cost £600 to build. It was opened on 10 March 1935 by Bishop Liston.

=== Dairies ===
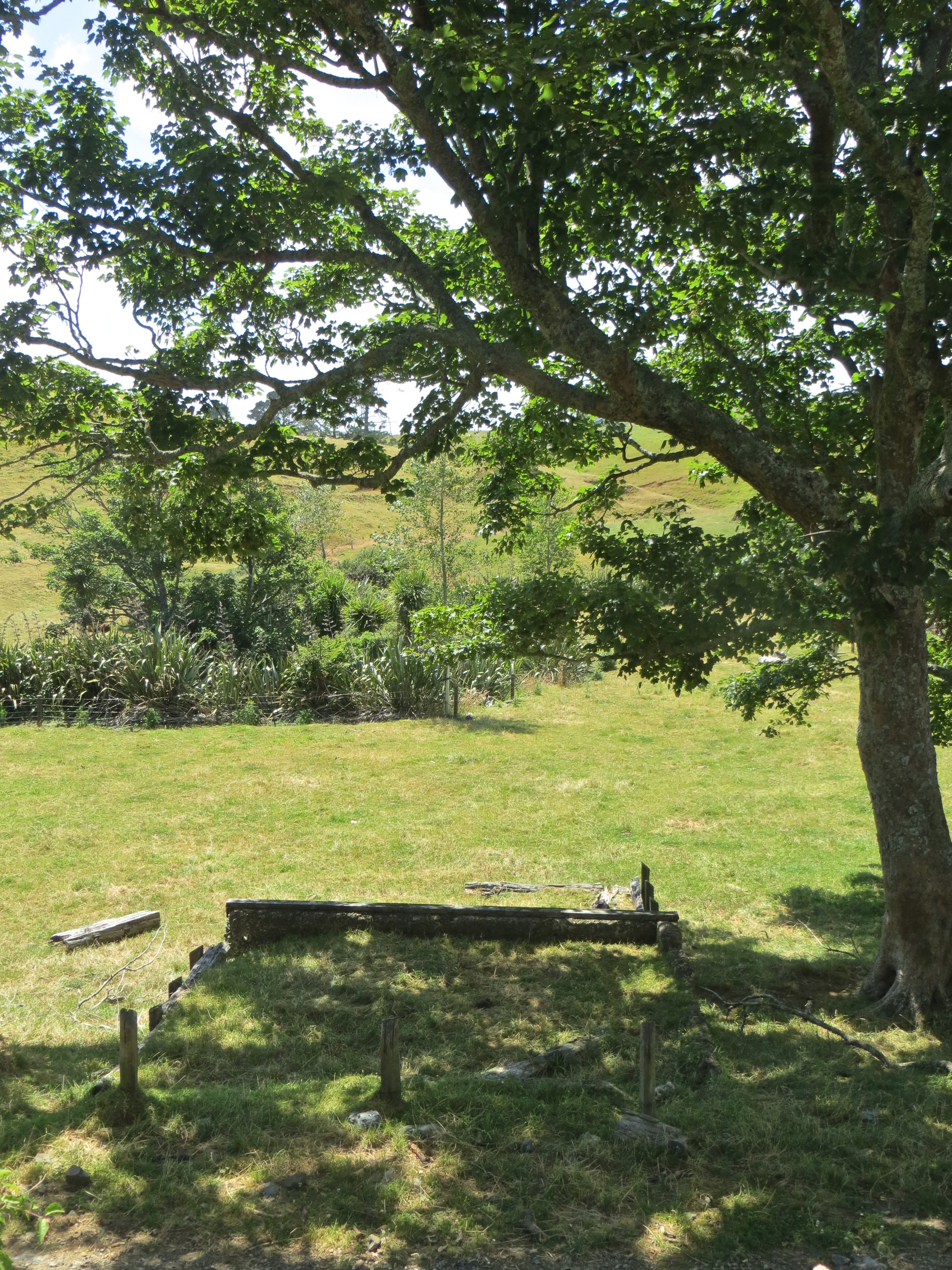
Site of the former (1899–1911) dairy factory on the edge of Te Mata Domain. For 1910 photo see here

About 1899 Mr. W. J. Smith built a butter factory, just south of Te Mata. In 1903 he sold the Te Mata Creamery for £600 and a Co-op Butter Factory was created, with 16 suppliers producing about 17 tons of butter a year. In 1911 it amalgamated with Kauroa and the Te Mata Factory closed.

=== Sawmills ===
The only mill at Te Mata was Fleming's who built a mill a short way up the Ruapuke road in 1903. They cut the timber for the 1905 Te Mata hall. There was also George Saunders' mill at Te Hutewai built about 1908 and powered by a water wheel, fed from a dam which is still there. Raglan Sawmilling Co was formed about 1919. Their Te Hutewai mill burnt down in 1928.

=== Saleyards ===
Kauroa saleyards, 5 km (3.1 mi) north of Te Mata, were first used on 21 January 1914, replacing sheep and cattle yards further north. Local farmers formed Kauroa Saleyards Society in 1977, when the yards were threatened with closure, and continue to hold sales.

=== Shops ===
The nearest shop is now at Te Uku, but in the past there were several others. Mr W. Duffus had a store at Motakotako on Phillips Rd by 1874. By 1880 it was owned by Mr J. W. Ellis. From the 1890s to the early 1920s Mr and Mrs Given ran a store and Post Office at Ruapuke. It closed in 1938, when Rural Delivery started from Te Mata. P. H. Watkins opened a store in 1896 and moved to a larger, more central store in 1902. A hat and frock shop opened in the old store, Scott's saddlery and Cornes' plumbing shops were at the junction of the Te Mata and Ruapuke Roads, Wally Thomson had a blacksmiths and, in the 1920s, there were 2 butchers, each with a slaughterhouse.

=== Telephone ===
About 1880 the first telephone line to connect Kawhia with Hamilton came via Waitetuna, Kauroa and Te Mata. In 1914 the Te Mata Telephone Association was joined by 40 settlers linked to the exchange at the local store operated 9 a.m. to 5 p.m., but with a 24-hour service for local calls. It went into liquidation in 1927 when the new post office, lines and exchange were built with 64 subscribers. The old lines had small insulators, galvanised wire, cheap poles and a single wire earth system. The exchange was automated in 1970.

== Education ==
Te Mata School (Raglan), a state full primary (years 1–8) school, had, as of 2013, a decile rating of 1 and a roll of 81. The school opened in 1877, built from prefabricated immigrants cottages, which had been shipped to Raglan in 1874, and later hauled to Te Mata by John Galvan's bullock team. The present school was built in 1905. New classrooms were built in 1961 and the 1905 building re-modelled. In 1964 the old school house was replaced with one from Te Hutewai school. School baths were built in the 50s, and a filtration plant added in 1969.

Former MP, Katherine O'Regan, was at the school from 1951 to 1958.

Schools formerly existed at Kauroa (1907 until amalgamated with Raglan 1941), Makomako (1926-after 1973), Pakihi (1935-1960-ish), Pakoka (1915–19), Raorao (1844 - 1904, or 1907), Ruapuke and Te Hutewai (1924-1958). Pupils now travel by school bus to Te Mata or Raglan.
