= Waitetuna =

- Village
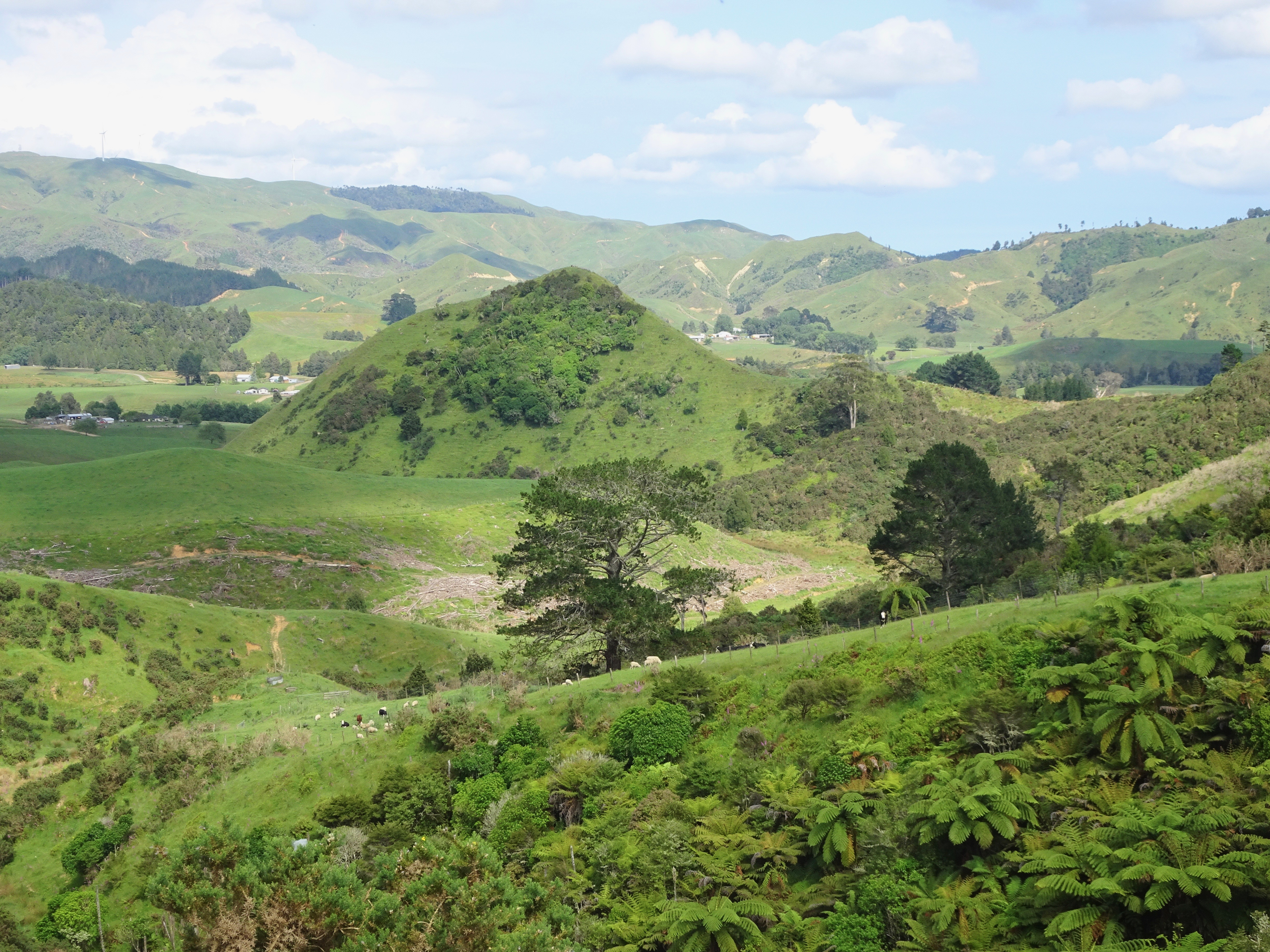
- Puketapu and Waitetuna valley
- Interactive map of Waitetuna
- Coordinates: 37°50′46″S 175°01′50″E
- Country: New Zealand
- Region: Waikato region
- District: Waikato District
- Wards: Whāingaroa General Ward; Tai Runga Takiwaa Maaori Ward
- Electorates: Taranaki-King Country; Hauraki-Waikato (Māori)

Government
  - Territorial Authority: Waikato District Council
  - Regional council: Waikato Regional Council
  - Mayor of Waikato: Aksel Bech
  - Taranaki-King Country MP: Barbara Kuriger
  - Hauraki-Waikato MP: Hana-Rawhiti Maipi-Clarke

Area
  - Territorial: 22.58 km^{2} (8.72 sq mi)
- Elevation: 40 m (130 ft)

Population (2023 census)
  - Territorial: 108
  - Density: 4.78/km^{2} (12.4/sq mi)
- Time zone: UTC+12 (NZST)
  - Summer (DST): UTC+13 (NZDT)

Waitetuna is a rural community in the Waikato District and Waikato region of New Zealand's North Island, in the valley of the Waitetuna River, upstream from the Raglan Harbour.

== History ==
Pollen analysis in the sediments of the Waitetuna arm of the harbour shows that the original vegetation of the valley was kahikatea on the flats, and a mixed podocarp-hardwood forest on the slopes, with totara, maire, mataī, rimu, rata, beech and tree ferns. Kauri was present, but not abundant.

Waitetuna is part of the rohe of Ngāti Māhanga. Aramiro station covers 1,985 ha (4,910 acres) of Māori freehold in the upper part of the valley.

In September 1864, after the invasion of the Waikato, the government bought the 20,840 acres (8,430 ha) Waipā–Waitetuna block, stretching from the summit of Pirongia to Te Uku Landing, for £1,500. A 2018 Waitangi Tribunal report said

The Waipa–Waitetuna purchase occurred during a Crown military occupation of land in Waikato (including the area covered by the purchase block) that was carried out with the express purpose of breaking down Māori authority, including customary rights to land. Although the evidence is not sufficient to draw firm conclusions, aspects of the purchase resemble the process of compensation for confiscated land.

Most of the farms were bought from the government in the 1900s and the bush on them was mostly felled, or burnt.

=== Roads ===
Three through roads serve Waitetuna.

The main road, SH23, is served by the Hamilton to Raglan bus. It was formed as a deviation from Old Mountain Rd between 1907 and 1912.

Waitetuna Valley Road runs south to Te Pahu and Te Awamutu. It follows the old Aramiro Track, which was widened to a 6 ft (1.8 m) track in 1909 and to Fillery Rd about 1990.

Old Mountain Road was originally the main road. It was formed as an extension to the first road, built in 1863 from Raglan via Okete to the Waitetuna River. The county history said

For a dozen years or more before the county was formed (1875), 10 miles of roughly formed dirt road, wide enough to carry horse-drawn drays, linked Raglan township with the Waitetuna River. From there the packhorse route (originally known as the Tikihouhou Track) made by the Army during the Waikato War, wound a tortuous way across the ranges, but it was too narrow, and too steep in parts, to carry vehicles. It became the through road to Hamilton in 1879.

The main road was metalled between 1914 and 1921 and sealing started in 1937, and was completed 1961.

=== Railways ===
Waitetuna almost got a railway. In 1923 the Waikato-West Coast railway district was set up under the 1914 Local Railways Act. It got a detailed survey done for a 2 ft 6in gauge railway and had a contractor ready to build a line through the Kaniwhaniwha and Waitetuna valleys, joined by an 18 ch (1,200 ft; 360 m) tunnel, past Te Uku School and Okete Falls and along the edge of the harbour to Raglan. However, it was opposed by local MP Alexander Young, the proposed local rate was defeated in an election in 1923 and the Board was wound up in 1928.

== Demographics ==
Waitetuna School is in meshblock 0861000, which had these census returns -

Year	Population	Average age	Households	Average income	National average
2001	72	40.2	27	$22,500	$18,500
2006	81	40	27	$36,300	$24,100
2013	93	35.5	36	$36,300	$27,900
2018	81				$31,800
2023	108				

== Education ==
Waitetuna School is a co-educational state primary school for Year 1 to 8 students, with a roll of 64 as of July 2026. It opened on 3 September 1962.

Until 24 August 1903 Te Uku School was known as Waitetuna. Aramiro School closed in 1964 and its pupils transferred to Waitetuna.
