= Waitetuna River =

River in New Zealand

Coordinates: 37.799533°S 174.971645°E

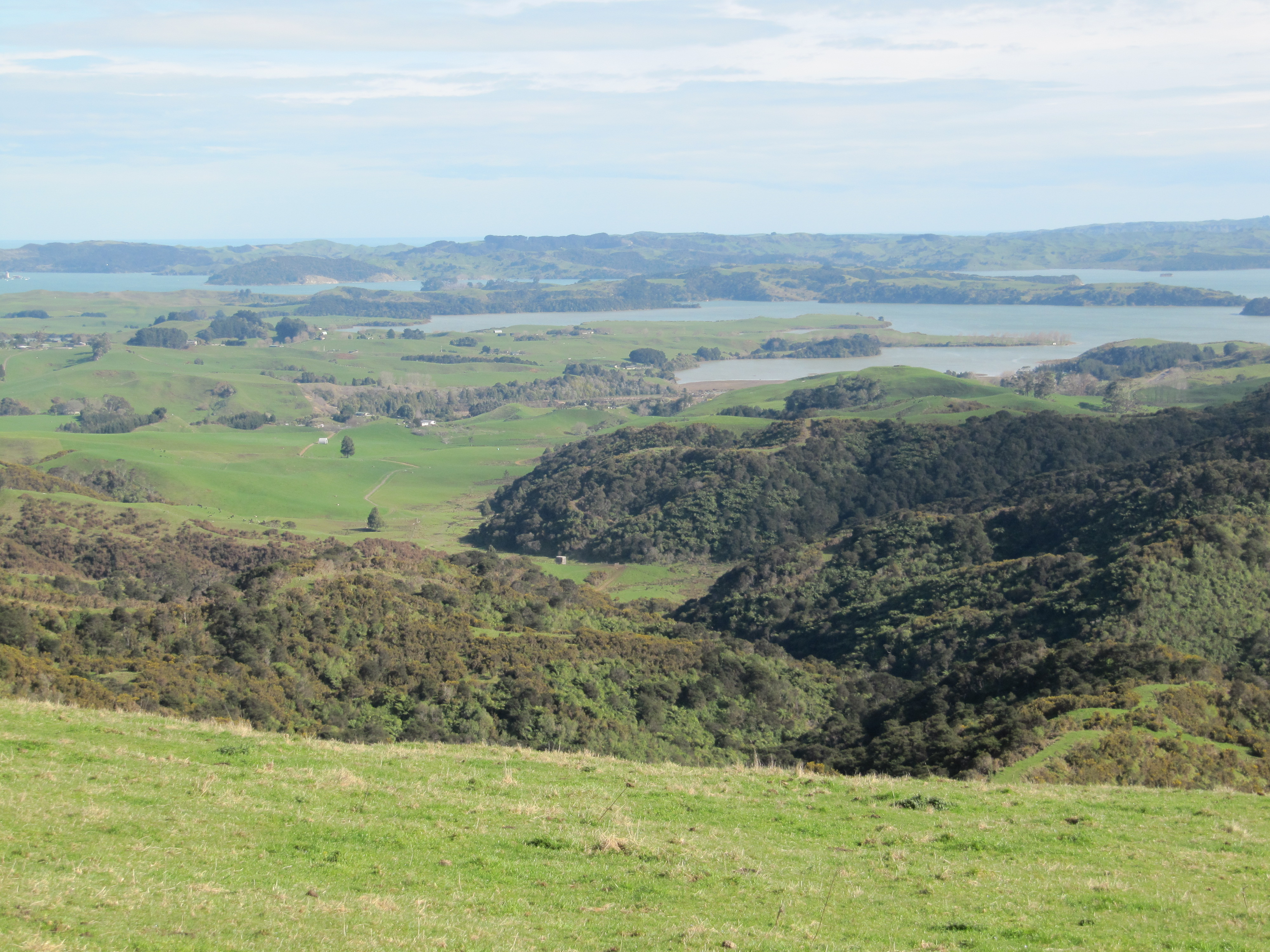
- The Waitetuna River reaches the Waitetuna arm of Whaingaroa Harbour through the trees (centre left). Beyond are Haroto Bay and Paritata Peninsula.

Location
- Country: New Zealand

Physical characteristics
- Source
  - elevation: 200 m (660 ft)
- Mouth
  - location: Raglan Harbour
  - elevation: 0 m (0 ft)
- Length: 17 km (11 mi)
- Basin size: 167 km^{2} (64 sq mi)

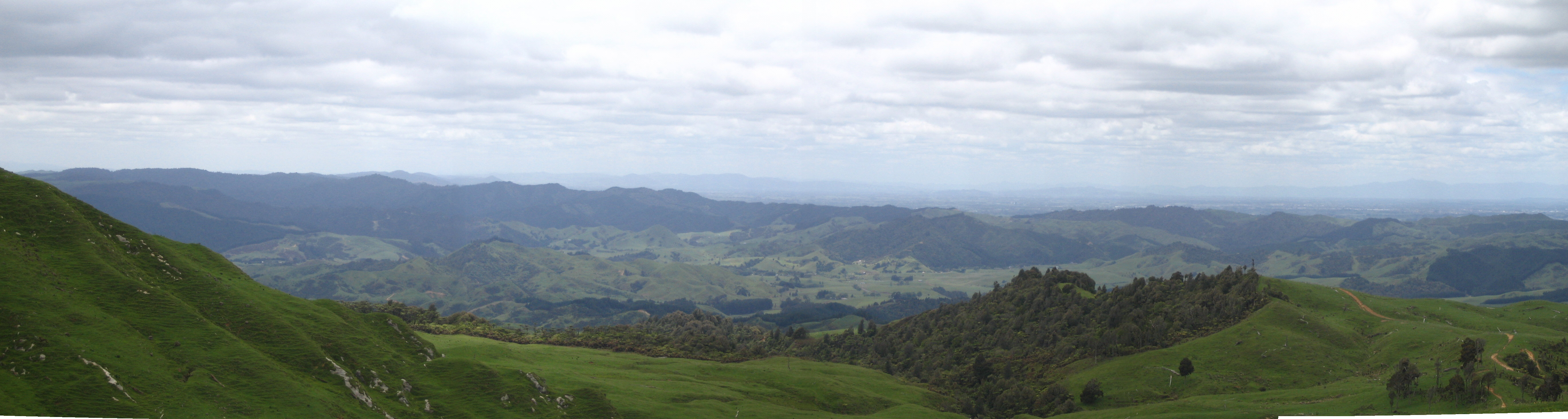
Upper Waitetuna valley from Wharauroa Plateau

The Waitetuna River is a river of the Waikato Region of New Zealand's North Island. It flows generally northwest from its sources southwest of Whatawhata to reach the southeastern coast of the Raglan Harbour.

== Geology ==
Mainly Upper Pliocene–Lower Pleistocene Okete volcanics erupted from many vents, mainly forming greywacke, with small areas of tephra.

== History ==
A study for the Regional Council said, "Harbour-wide sediment accumulation rates (SAR) have averaged 0.3–0.5 mm yr^{−1} over the last 8000-6500 years. The effects of large-scale catchment deforestation (1890-1920s), conversion to pasture and plantation forestry (1985–) on sedimentation have occurred very differently in the Waingaro and Waitetuna arms of the harbour. In the Waitetuna arm, ^{14}C dating of shell and exotic-pollen profiles preserved in core 12B indicate that pre-human SAR of 0.35 mm yr^{−1} has increased threefold following deforestation and averaging 1.1 mm yr^{−1} since 1890. Pine pollen, which is produced in large quantities and widely dispersed by the wind, suggests that SAR have further increased to 2.5 mm yr^{−1} since the early 1990s. At Okete Bay (core 10B) pre-human SAR averaged 0.5 mm yr^{−1}. The pine pollen profile indicates that SAR have averaged 8 mm yr^{−1} since the early 1990s."

A larger than average part of that post-1890 change took place when the 2,569 acres (1,040 ha) Puketutu block, near the estuary, was bought by the Watkins Brothers in 1901. They ran a sawmill in Raglan from 1905 to 1910, largely supplied with timber floated down the river and then towed across the harbour. In 1907 Watkins were selling kahikatea and rimu.

The deforestation took place following sale of most land in the area to settlers. The river was a boundary of the first major land sale. "On 22 March 1851, eighteen chiefs of Ngāti-Māhanga and Ngāti-Hourua, headed by William Naylor, sold to Queen Victoria for the sum of £400, 19,680 acres of country bordering on the southern shores of the harbour. The western boundary of the Whāingaroa Block, as it came to be known, began at Putoetoe (the point on which the town of Raglan now stands) and followed the Opotoru Stream inland. Leaving that stream at its junction with the Hutewai, the line ran south beyond Te Mata to a point "marked by a hole dug by the side of the path to Aotea." Here it turned north-eastward to run (again in a straight line) for eight miles through dense forest to meet the Waitetuna River, the last few miles of which formed the eastern boundary. The 30 square miles thus enclosed included most of the present rich farmlands lying between Karioi Mountain on the west and the Waitetuna on the east; the harbour in the north and the Wharauroa Plateau in the south. Reporting to the Colonial Secretary on 15 April 1852, after paying over the second instalment for the land, Ligar drew attention to the fact that the block was surrounded on three sides by water, thus solving to some extent the problem of communication. "The soil," he said, "is of the finest description, having for its basis a limestone formation. It is also well watered and has an abundant supply of timber for fuel, for building purposes or for commerce."

== Vegetation ==
Pollen analysis shows that the original vegetation was kahikatea on the flats, and a mixed podocarp-hardwood forest on the slopes, with tōtara, maire, matai, rimu, rata, beech and tree ferns. Kauri was present, but not abundant. From 1890 to 1930 80% of the forest was converted to pasture, though some pines have since been planted on former pasture, including 5 km^{2} (1.9 sq mi) by Vela Holdings east of Mangaokahu Stream in 1990–1991. By the mid-1920s indigenous forest was restricted to the steeplands of Mount Karioi, Pirongia and the Moerangi Plateau.

== Fauna and water quality ==
The podocarp forest is now mostly sheep and beef farms, with Te Uku Wind Farm around the sources to the south. A survey for the windfarm said, "The lower and mid reaches of the . . . Matakotea Stream provide very good native fish habitat, notably for inanga, and within well vegetated reaches, banded kokopu." It described the Waitetuna at its mouth as having moderate ecological health. A January 2008 survey identified these indicator species for stream quality as being present in the Waitetuna where it enters the harbour and in its tributary, Matakotea Stream, (the numbers on the left are the MCI Score – the higher the score, the more sensitive these macroinvertebrates are to pollution. The words on the right show how common or rare they were in the Matakotea Stream / Waitetuna at Te Uku landing):

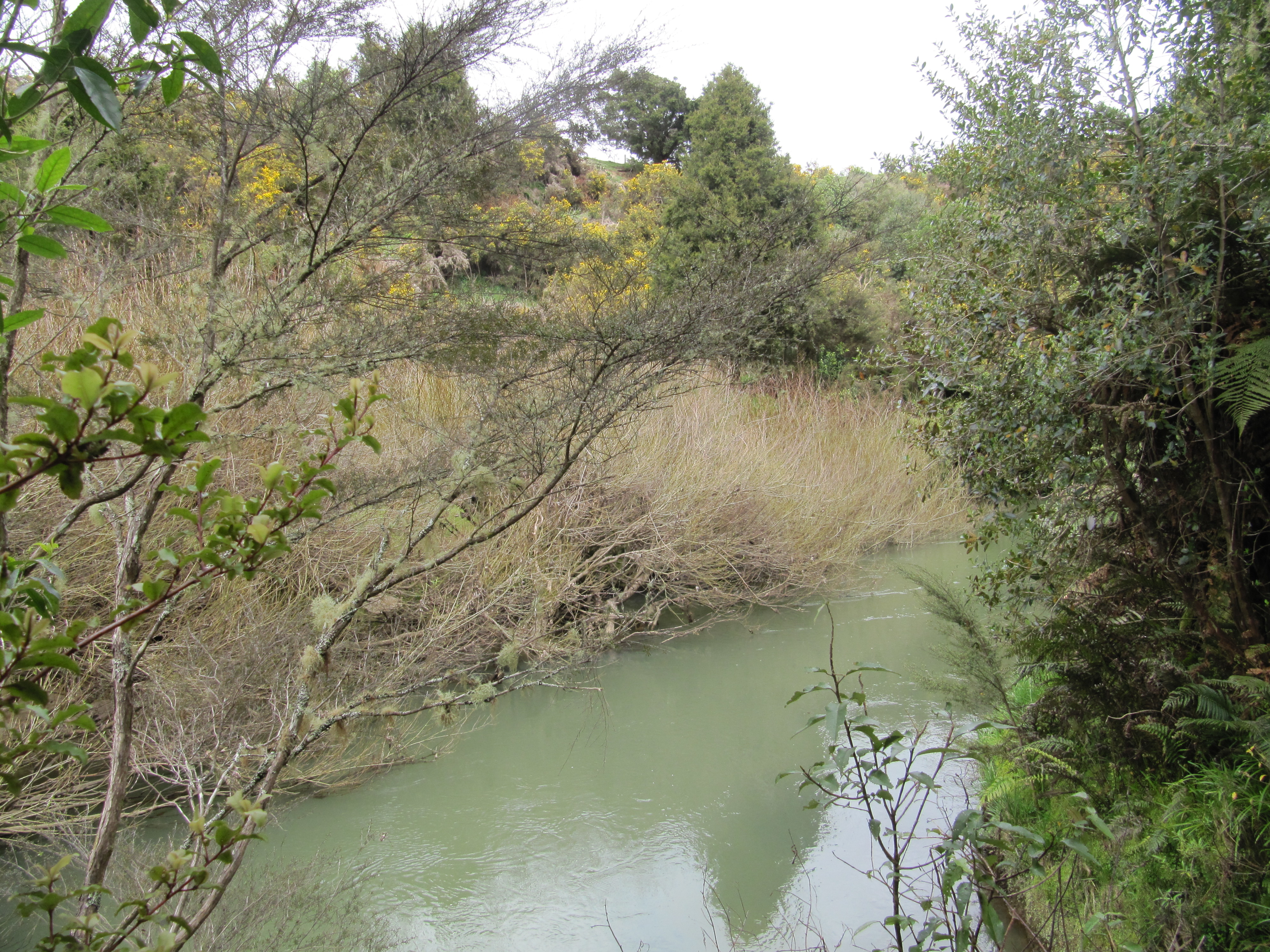
Waitetuna River about 3km up from the harbour

(9) spiny-gilled mayfly (Coloburiscus humeralis) common / –

(8) mayfly (Deleatidium) abundant / rare

(7) caddisfly (Rhyacophilidae) occasional / occasional

(7) dobsonfly (Archichauliodes diversus) rare / occasional

(6) riffle beetle (Elmidae) 6 common / common

(5) stony-cased caddisfly (Pycnocentrodes) occasional / occasional

(5) Crustacea (Paratya curvirostris) occasional / abundant

(4) mud snail (Potamopyrgus antipodarum) abundant / abundant

(3) sand fly (Austrosimulium) common / occasional

The NIWA Freshwater Fish Database shows the Waitetuna has longfin and shortfin eels, common and redfin bully, galaxiids and inanga.

== Pollution ==
Ministry for the Environment figures showed the Waitetuna at its mouth had 600 E. coli per 100ml (17th worst out of 154), 620 faecal coliforms per 100ml (38th of 252), 0.49 mg/litre nitrogen (174th of 342) and 0.04 mg/litre phosphorus (140th of 361). The quality is in the worst 25% of rivers for E.coli, clarity, turbidity and worst 50% for nitrogen and phosphorus.

A government study says, "Waitetuna streams have recorded average Enterococcus counts near or above 100/100 ml, when a reading of 33/100 ml is considered the maximum safe level for contact recreation (ie, swimming). Some readings during the year reached counts of . . . 520." The river has 23 km (6.9%) of fencing, which reduces pollution by farm stock. The only comparatively good statistic on pollution is that for acidity.

Pollution has improved at 1.3% a year for the years 1993–2017 for nitrate-N and 3.3% for 2008–2017 for visual clarity as measured by important (i.e. slope direction probability over 95% and RSKSE over 1% pa) improvements in relative seasonal Kendall slope estimator (RSKSE) trends (monthly records are flow-adjusted using a Lowess curve fit with 30% span). In 2017, a farm was fined almost $50,000 for pumping dairy effluent into an area where it ponded near the river, where it could be seen from the main road. It is possible similar incidents in less public areas may account for the finding in 2011 that most pollutants in the river were deteriorating, despite fencing and planting. The study also lacked baseline data.

== See also ==
- List of rivers of New Zealand
