= State Highway 22 (New Zealand) =

Road in New Zealand

State Highway 22

Route information
- Maintained by NZ Transport Agency Waka Kotahi
- Length: 12.7 km (7.9 mi)

Major junctions
- North end: SH 1 (Auckland Southern Motorway) near Drury
- South end: Adams Drive in Pukekohe

Location
- Country: New Zealand

Highway system
- New Zealand state highways; Motorways and expressways; List
← SH 21	→ SH 23

State Highway 22 (SH 22) is a New Zealand state highway just south of Auckland. It connects the town of Pukekohe to the Auckland Southern Motorway.

== Route ==
The route begins at Exit 461 on SH 1 near Drury and travels in a general south-west direction along Karaka Road, and then south to Pukekohe. The highway officially terminates where SH 22 meets the northern intersection with Adams Drive. From there the road changes to Edinburgh Street and continues into Pukekohe town centre.

== Major intersections ==
The entire route is within Auckland.

Location	km	mi	Exit	Name	Destinations	Notes
Drury	0	0.0	461		SH 1 south (Auckland Southern Motorway) – Hamilton; SH 1 north (Auckland Southern Motorway) – Auckland	SH 22 begins
Karaka	7.1	4.4			Glenbrook Road – Waiuku	
Pukekohe	12.7	7.9			Corner of Paerata Road, Adams Drive and Lough Bourne Drive	SH 22 ends

== History ==
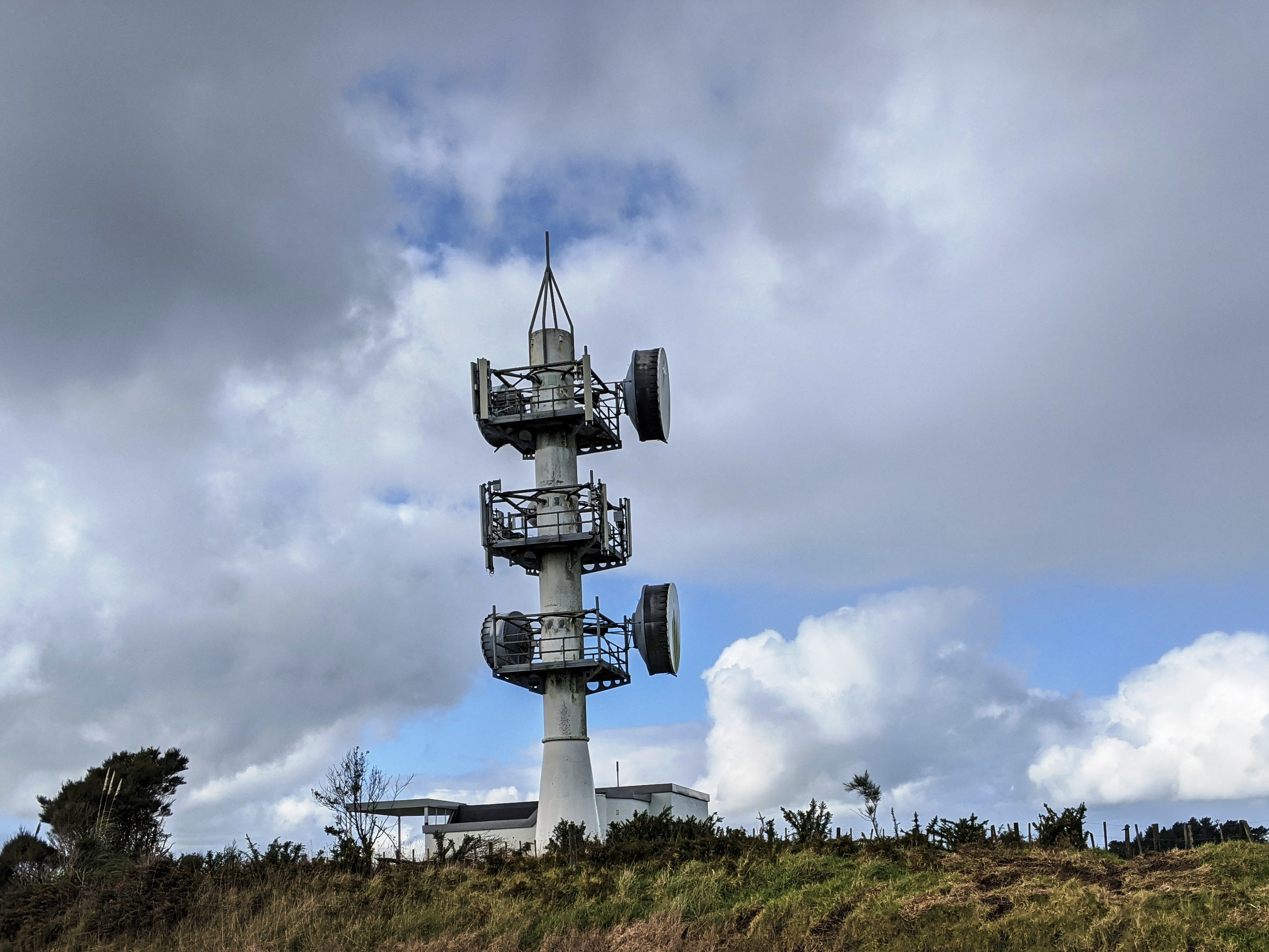
Ahuroa telecommunications tower at the junction of Highway 22 and Waikaretu Valley Road

SH 22 used to cover a much longer route, via Tuakau, all the way to meet with SH 23 (which runs from Hamilton to Raglan). This section was revoked circa 1990 although much of the original route still holds the name "Highway 22".

Metalling of the southern Te Uku-Waingaro section, to what is now SH 23, was completed in 1937. In 1944 what was to become State Highway 22 was expected to become an arterial road linking Auckland and New Plymouth. That was long before the National Roads Board, gazetted it as State Highway 22 in July 1963, which designation was first shown on a one-inch map in 1971.

A start was made on upgrading the road to the SH 23 junction near Te Uku in the early 1960s. 85% of the cost (£75,000 in 1961 – $3.3m at 2017 prices) was paid by the National Roads Board.

== See also ==
- List of New Zealand state highways
