= Apium prostratum subsp. howense =

Scientific classification
- Kingdom: Plantae
- Clade: Tracheophytes
- Clade: Angiosperms
- Clade: Eudicots
- Clade: Asterids
- Order: Apiales
- Family: Apiaceae
- Genus: Apium
- Species: A. prostratum
- Subspecies: A. p. subsp. howense

Trinomial name
- Apium prostratum subsp. howense P.S.Short

Subspecies of flowering plant

Apium prostratum subsp. howense is a flowering plant in the carrot family native to Australia's Lord Howe Island. The epithet howense derives from the name of that island.

== Description ==
It is a perennial herb, tufted, trailing and aromatic when bruised, with stems growing to 30 cm long. The pinnate leaves are 20–170 mm long. The tiny flowers are white to pinkish. The fruits are 1.5–2 mm across.

== Distribution and habitat ==
The subspecies is endemic to Australia’s subtropical Lord Howe Island in the Tasman Sea. There it is fairly common in sand pockets and cracks in coralline rocks on the shoreline, within the splash zone. Joseph Maiden's 1889 book 'The Useful Native Plants of Australia records how 'Apium australe' could be used as a culinary vegetable and also refers to it as 'Australian Celery".
