= Opotoru River =

Coordinates: 37.831986°S 174.870499°E

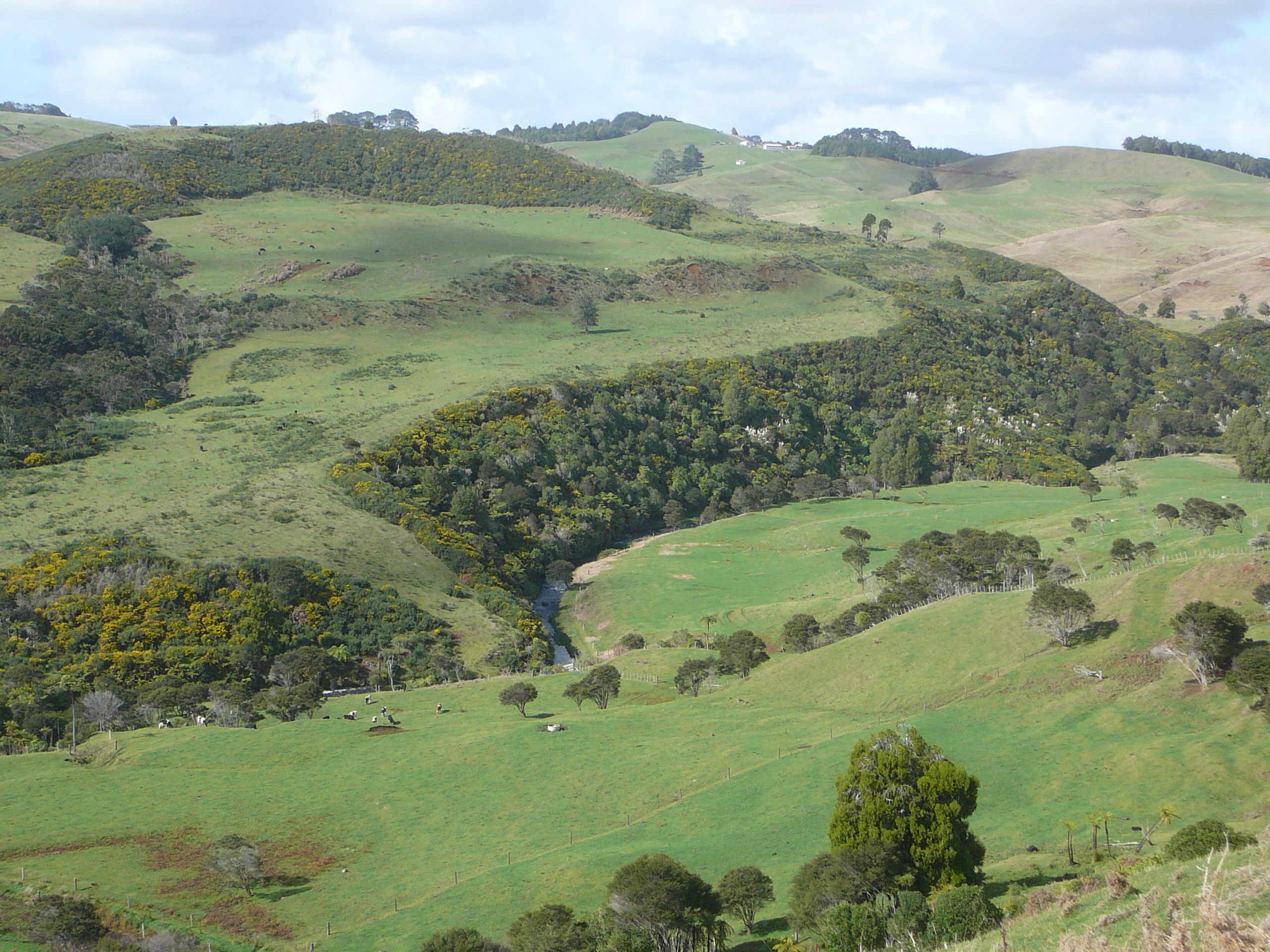
- Opotoru River in the lower part of its valley

Location
- Country: New Zealand

Physical characteristics
- Source
  - location: Karioi
  - elevation: 756 m (2,480 ft)
- Mouth
  - location: Raglan Harbour
  - elevation: 0 m (0 ft)
- Length: 14 km (9 mi)
- Basin size: 36 km^{2} (14 sq mi)

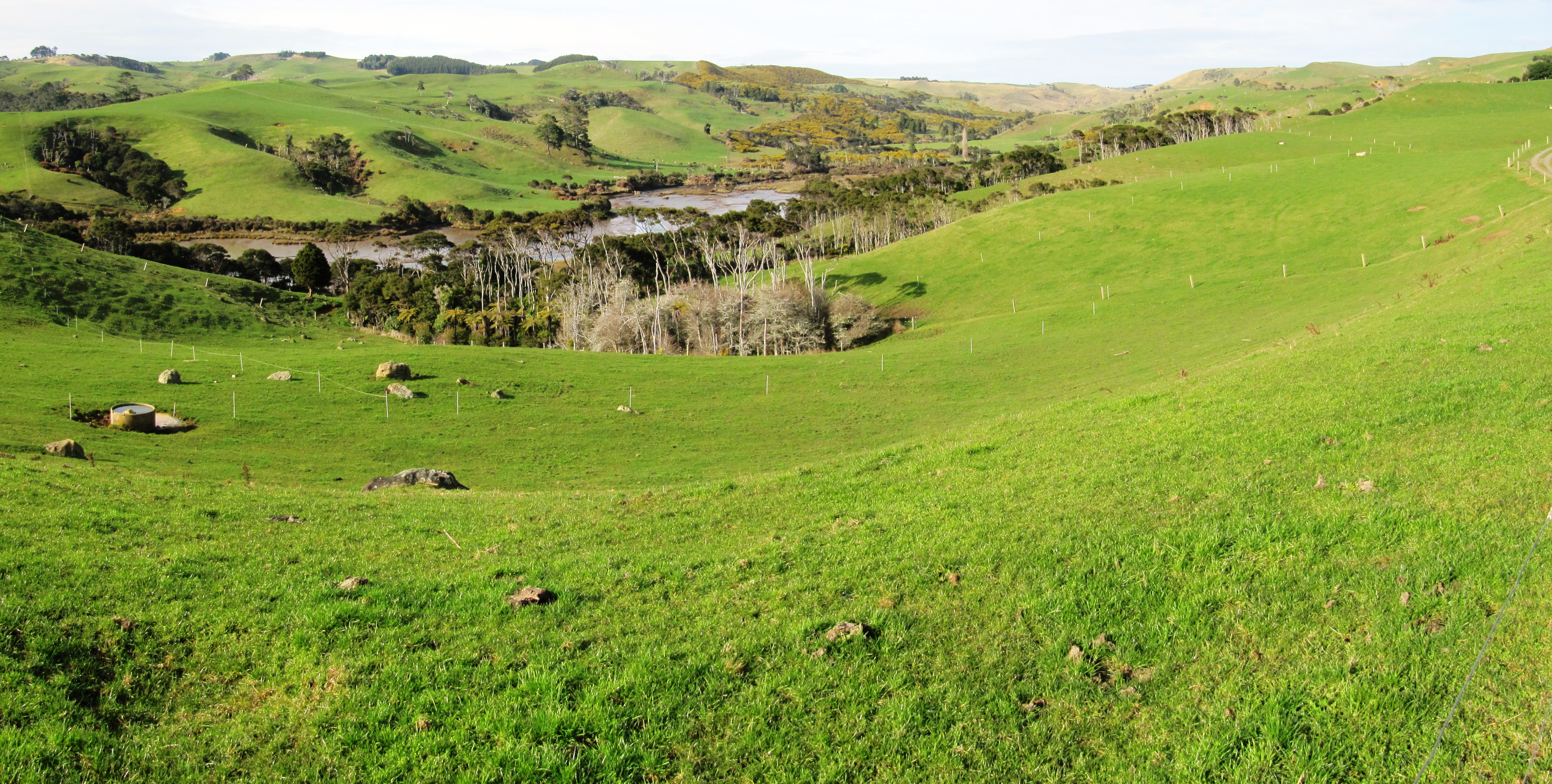
The tidal creek and saltmarsh, about 1 kilometre (0.6 mi) below the photo above

The Opotoru River is a river of the Waikato Region of New Zealand's North Island. It flows north, reaching the Raglan Harbour southwest of the town of Raglan. There is no regular monitoring of pollution, but 38 kilometres (24 mi) (31.2%) of the river has been fenced to protect it from farm stock.

== Name ==
The Oct 1947 Lands and Survey one inch map shows the name 'Opotoru R' applied to the tidal creek of the harbour and 'Opotoru S' to the stretch through Te Mata. The 1971 2nd edition and current 1:50,000 maps (see http://www.topomap.co.nz/NZTopoMap/37544) show 'Opotoru River' for the lower part of the waterway, but 'Te Mata Stream' for the part up from the Te Hutewai Stream confluence. 'Te Mata Stream' appears to have been named 'Takapaunui Stream' in the 1910 postcards (see link below) and in the 1915 Bradbury's Illustrated Guide to The Raglan & Kawhia District.

On 7 February 1974 the name Opotoru River was gazetted as the official name for the short length of waterway from Opotoru Creek to Te Mata Strream, replacing both Opotoro River and Opoturu River.

== Geology ==
The Geology of the Raglan-Kawhia Area says, "The N-striking faults are evidenced by trends of the Tasman Sea coastline and probably by stream drainages such as that of the Opotoru River c 6 km E of Karioi summit." and "The base, consisting of interbedded conglomerate, sandstone, and locally siltstone, is strongly unconformable on Te Kuiti Group rocks south of Raglan at the Opotoru River estuary (R 14/751741)".

Chert is found beside a tributary at Te Mata and pebbles have been found downstream.

== History ==
Raglan County Hills and Sea says, "On 11 January [1854] McLean purchased a small part of Te Mata at the SW corner of the Whaingaroa Block. The description of its boundaries, as recorded in the Deed of Sale, is worth quoting in part, if only for the quaintness of the wording: In the N the boundary was "the Government-cut line from the Opotoru Creek to the hole dug by C. W. Ligar Esquire; on the south side from the aforesaid hole to the root of the totara tree as left by William Naylor on making a canoe of the said tree, this root of the totara tree being close to the Opotoru Creek," which formed the W limit of the area. On 6 May a further section of Te Mata land was acquired, making a total of 630 acres. By 1858, 2130 acres of undulating forest land at Te Mata had been secured."

== Natural history ==
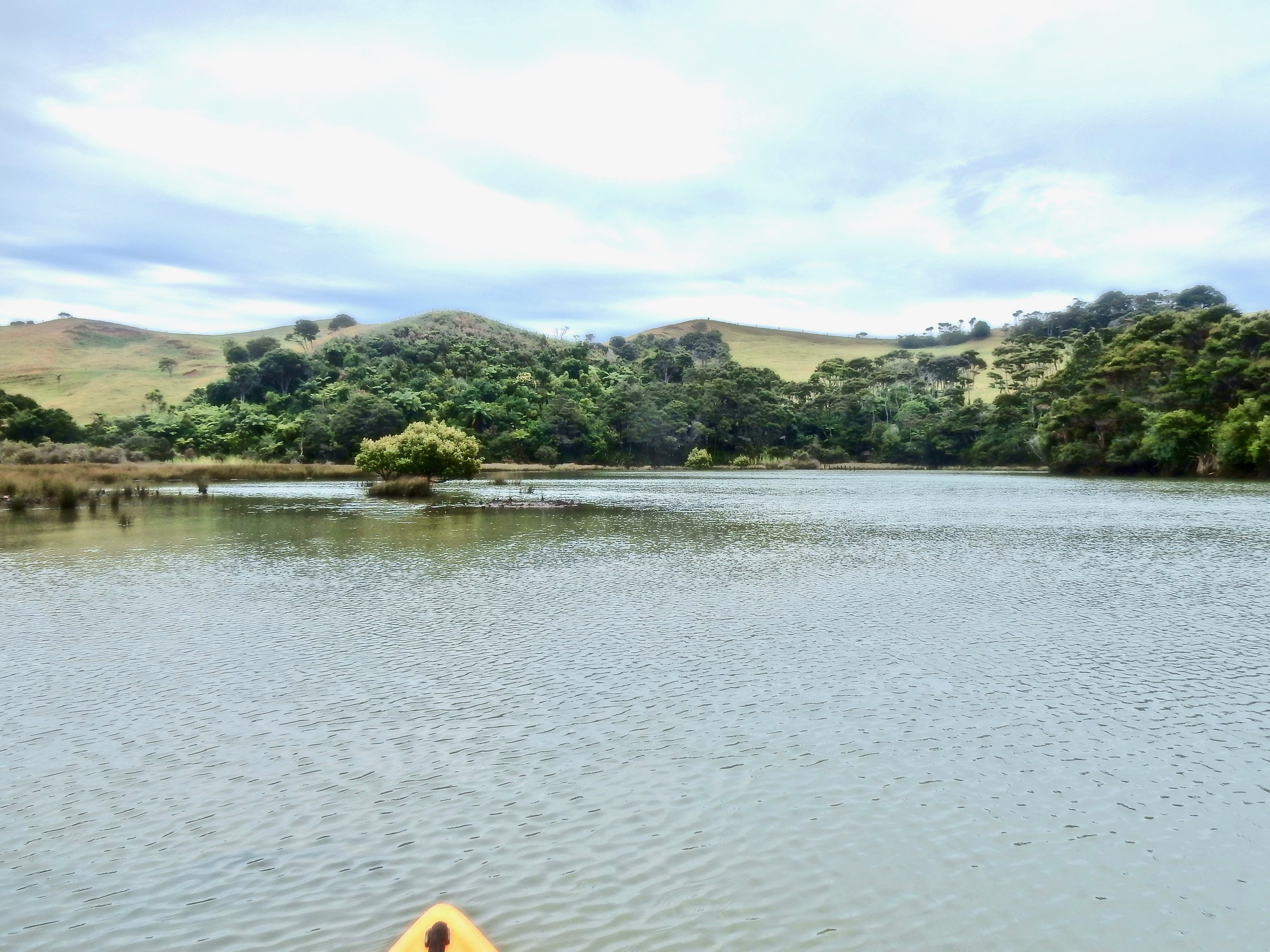
mangrove at Opotoru River mouth

36% of the catchment is farmland and 50% forest. Most of the forest is native bush on Mount Karioi, the rest mostly being scattered remnants of bush.

2004 and 2012 Regional Council vegetation surveys reported the river mouth and the saltmarsh, up to a small rapid in the River, as having mangroves (mānawa), manuka, mingimingi, cabbage trees (tī kōuka), remuremu, sea rush, oioi, saltmarsh ribbonwood (mākaka), flax, sea primrose, leptinella dioica, giant umbrella sedge (Toetoe upokotangata), tall fescue, coastal daisy and celery.

== See also ==
- List of rivers of New Zealand
- 1910 estuary postcard http://natlib.govt.nz/records/23162419
- 1910 Te Mata postcards http://natlib.govt.nz/records/22726677 and http://natlib.govt.nz/records/22874732
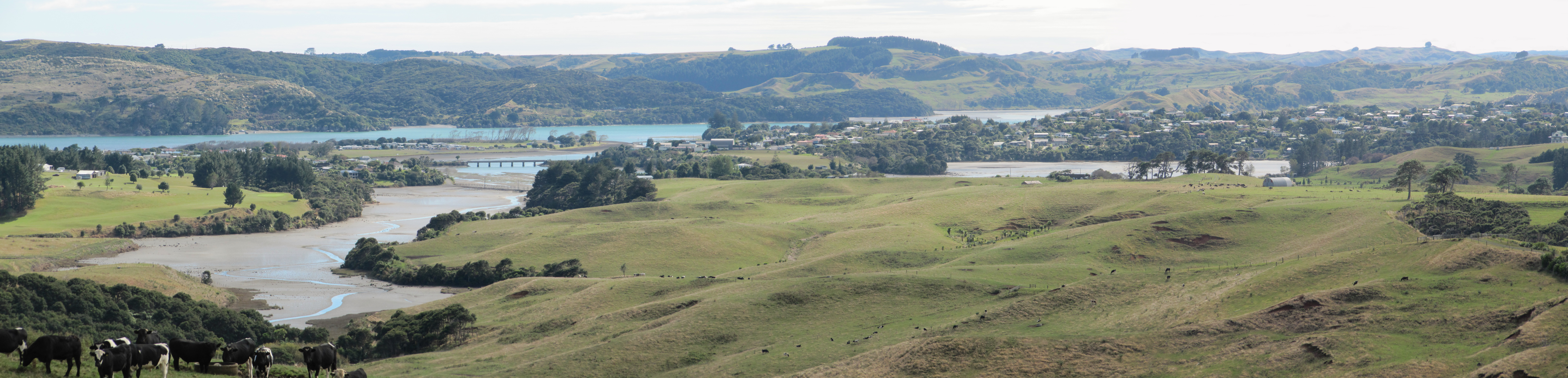
  compare this April 2010 photo with the estuary postcard photo of a century before - the 1907 road bridge is in the same position as the 1955 bridge.
