= James and Mary Wallis =

English missionaries

James and Mary Wallis (James, 18 April 1809, London – 5 July 1895, Auckland and Mary Ann, 26 May 1802 – 8 February 1893, Auckland) were Wesleyan missionaries and the first European settlers in Raglan, New Zealand. They served in Northern Wairoa, Waingaroa, Onehunga and Raglan.

== Early years and journey to New Zealand ==
Born on 18 April 1809 in Blackwall, London, James Wallis felt the call to ministry at a young age after a personal spiritual awakening. On 16 April 1834—after being accepted for a position to the Pacific via the Wesleyan Missionary Society—he married Mary Ann Reddick (born 26 May 1802). A few weeks later they were aboard a vessel bound for Australia en route to the fledgling Māngungu Mission, in the Hokianga, New Zealand.

After several months in Hobart, Australia, James and Mary arranged a vessel to carry them to the Hokianga Harbour, New Zealand whereby they arrived on 1 December 1834. Immediately upon entering the harbour mouth, their ship was caught by a gust of wind and laid

“nearly on her beam ends and the rocks. Recovering from this danger the captain ran his vessel a mile or two up the river and dropped anchor at the pilot station. A few minutes after the anchor was down a large number of natives came on board whose wild antics and unitelligable jargon gave us an insight into the kind of people among whom out lot was to be cast for an indefinite time”

After several months at Māngungu, where a new mission house was under construction, James was surprised at the practical nature of his work "A New Zealand Missionary was to be a man of all work". Eventually becoming frustrated at the lack of spiritual input he was able to contribute he pushed for a new mission base to be established under his leadership in the Kawhia and Whaingaroa (now known as Raglan) regions further south on the west coast of the North Island.

== First years in Raglan ==
In April 1835, James and Mary Wallis, along with another missionary couple, John Whiteley and his wife, and a number of Maori chiefs from Hokianga arrived - via a three-day sailing journey at Kāwhia Harbour. The Hokianga chiefs spoke in favor of the missionaries and a crowd of about 1,000 were present to celebrate their arrival.

Missionary influence in New Zealand circa 1840 showing the locations of importance with respect to James and Mary Wallis.

While Mrs Wallis stayed at Kāwhia with the other missionaries, James journeyed on foot to Raglan, a distance of about 30 km across very rough terrain with his local Maori guide who had been expecting his arrival - some 12 months previous, the establishment of a mission station had been agreed between Maori chiefs and members of a Wesleyan reconnaissance tour of the region....

“Here [at Raglan] I was met with a warm reception from the natives who from various considerations welcomed me as their future instructor. A rush hut about eight feet by five feet was assigned to me as my residence.... Building of the Mission House was undertaken by some fifty or sixty men, only about a third of whom worked at one time all the rest looking on, and occasionally suggesting an improved style of architecture. In the course of a few weeks, the house was finished so far as labor was needed..... As soon as the house was habitable Mrs. Wallis was fetched by a dozen natives who carried her in a sedan of their own construction."

Immediately upon arrival - in between the practicalities of establishing a mission station complete with gardens and home at Te Horea, on the north side of the Raglan Harbor, religious services began with the attendance of as many as 200 people at one time. Initially, services consisted of the reading of passages of Scripture and commentary by a Maori interpreter and assistant to Wallis who had been trained at Mangungu. It was not long before James and his wife has a full grasp of the Maori language and could converse fluently without an interpreter. On 23 November 1835 the Wallis’ first child was born, Elizabeth Reddick, the first European born in the district.

The mission to Raglan was successful in converting many local Maori people who were very receptive to the message of the Bible. By January 1836, several large and influential tribes had professed faith with the most notable conversion being that of the notable local warrior and chief Wiremu Neera Te Awaitaia.

== Tangiteroria ==
Around about May 1836, word was received from the London Secretaries of the Wesleyan Missionary Society that it had been agreed that the area south of the Manukau would be occupied by the Church Missionary Society and that all the Methodist Missionaries around Kawhia and Raglan were to withdraw. This news was a great shock to James and Mary — as well as local Maori as their work in Raglan was flourishing. On 1 June 1836, Wallis wrote:

“Left Waingaroa this morning with heart overwhelmed with sorrow and not without some doubts relative to the propriety of the steps we are taking. The Lord has been please own our labors at Waingaroa in a measure far surpassing anything we had anticipated and the people have regarded us as their principal friends.... Several of them accompanied us to sea as far as they safety could then threw themselves into their canoes returning to land with hearts overwhelmed.”

It was decided that the Wallis’ would now pioneer a new mission station that was some distance into the Kaipara region, in Northland, and up a branch of the Wairoa River at Tangiteroria. Here they labored, building a new mission house and gardens. As the Maori settlements were some distance away, and the local people of this area “manifested no desire for religious instruction” James had to travel considerable distances to preach the message. After 12 months of rather fruitless labor in the Kaipara region, a visit from Raglan Maori encouraged him to return to their region with reports that many were still attending worship and were learning to read and write under the leadership of their own people. Wallis petitioned the secretaries of the Wesleyan Missionary Society in London for permission to return to Raglan and about October 1838, seeing as the area had still not been occupied by the CMS, his return was approved. The work at Tangiteroria had, by now, had some success with a local chief beginning to attend worship and learning to read and write and the work there continued after the Wallis’ left under the leadership of James Buller.

== Nihinihi ==
The Nihinihi Mission House in Raglan.

On 4 March 1839, the barque Elizabeth which had been charted by Wallis arrived at Raglan to be greeted by a large crowd of Maori who had gathered to express joy at the return of the missionaries. The old mission house at Te Horea on the north side of the harbour had fallen into a state of disrepair. The Wallis's therefore made arrangements for the future of the mission to be at Nihinihi on the south side of the harbour and so land was purchased and James began construction of...

“The third station, the entire of which in planning and building etc, has exclusively devolved upon myself, and when I look back on the years I have spent in NZ, I am grieved that a greater portion of my time has not been more directly devoted to the spiritual interests of the perishing...”

On the first Sunday after his return Wallis preached twice at the old chapel at Te Horea to a congregation of nearly 500 and married and baptised two couples. Later, at a local village he preached to a crowd of 800 and performed 65 baptisms. James and Mary were to serve in the region until 1863 when they were transferred to Onehunga for health reasons. There was a large gathering of local Maori and Europeans to pay respect to the missionaries as they departed.

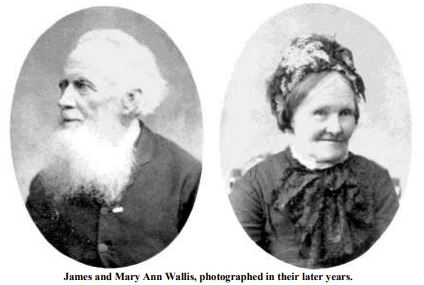

== Auckland ==
James and Mary Ann Wallis moved to Auckland in 1866. Mary Ann Wallis died on 8 February 1893 in Mount Eden. She was buried in the Symonds Street Cemetery.

Rev. James Wallis died on 5 July 1895 in the Mount Eden home of his son Robert Martin Wallis (1844–1919) and Emily Sarah Wallis (later Pearce, died 1935). Emily was a member of the Auckland chapter of the Women's Christian Temperance Union New Zealand. He was buried next to his wife in the Symonds Street Cemetery.

== Timeline ==
- 1836: Wallis' brother William arrived at Mangungu Mission station in the Hokianga, but fell from the vessel while he was disembarking and drowned. James' oldest son, born a year later on 29 April 1837, was named William almost certainly in honour of James' brother.
- 1840: the Treaty of Waitangi was signed by local Maori with James Wallis signing as a witness.
- July 1842: the Governor William Hobson and Ensign Best visited the station at Raglan for two days. The Governor expressed his appreciation of the work.
- 1852: the Crown purchased 19,000 acres (77 km^{2}) around Raglan with the view to settle farmers. James, on behalf of his two oldest sons William and Thomas acquired two blocks including the Okete falls with the intention to erect a flour mill driven by a water wheel. Due to the death of Thomas and the transfer of James and Mary to Onehunga in 1863, the flour mill never eventuated. However, in 1868 the site was adapted to run as a flax mill by William - remnants of the site are still visible today.
- 1858: James’ sister Mary and her husband came out to New Zealand, a young woman by the name of Harriet whom they had met on the ship was introduced to William at Okete and the two of them established their family at Okete. Their eldest son Arthur married Ada Burton and they built the homestead "Overton" which is still inhabited and farmed by the Wallis family today.

== Children of James and Mary Wallis ==
- Elizabeth Reddick Wallis Fletcher Watkin; married Rev. William Horner Fletcher in 1857 and lived with him in Fiji until he died in 1881. She then married the widower Rev. William Jackson Watkins (1833-1909) and lived with him in Onehunga. She was elected founding president of the Onehunga chapter of the Women's Christian Temperance Union New Zealand on 20 May 1898.
- William Henry
- Sarah Lydia; married George Brown, a missionary in Savai'i, New Britain and New Ireland - they had five children.
- Thomas Jackson
- James Waterhouse
- Robert Martin
- Mary Harriet
- Emily Rebecca

== See also ==
- Christianity in New Zealand
- History of New Zealand
