= State Highway 23 (New Zealand) =

Road in New Zealand

State Highway 23

Route information
- Maintained by NZ Transport Agency
- Length: 42.7 km (26.5 mi)

Major junctions
- East end: SH 1C (Lincoln Street/Greenwood Street) in Hamilton
- SH 39 (Horotiu Road/Kakaramea Road) in Whatawhata
- West end: Greenslade Road in Raglan

Location
- Country: New Zealand

Highway system
- New Zealand state highways; Motorways and expressways; List
← SH 22	→ SH 24

State Highway 23 (SH 23) is a New Zealand state highway that connects the towns of Raglan and Hamilton.

== Route ==
SH 23 commences in the Hamilton suburb of Frankton at the intersection of Massey Street and SH 1C (Lincoln Street, Greenwood Street). It travels west down Massey Street, changing to Whatawhata Road after a six-leg roundabout in the suburb of Dinsdale. After exiting Hamilton, and reaching the town of Whatawhata it shares a brief concurrency of the north–south SH 39 and crosses the Waipā River. It then continues west over the summit to the Waitetuna valley, through Te Uku and over tributaries of the Whaingaroa Harbour until reaching Raglan. The route terminates on the approach to Raglan at a point approximately 150 metres (160 yd) west of Greenslade Road.

== Traffic flows ==
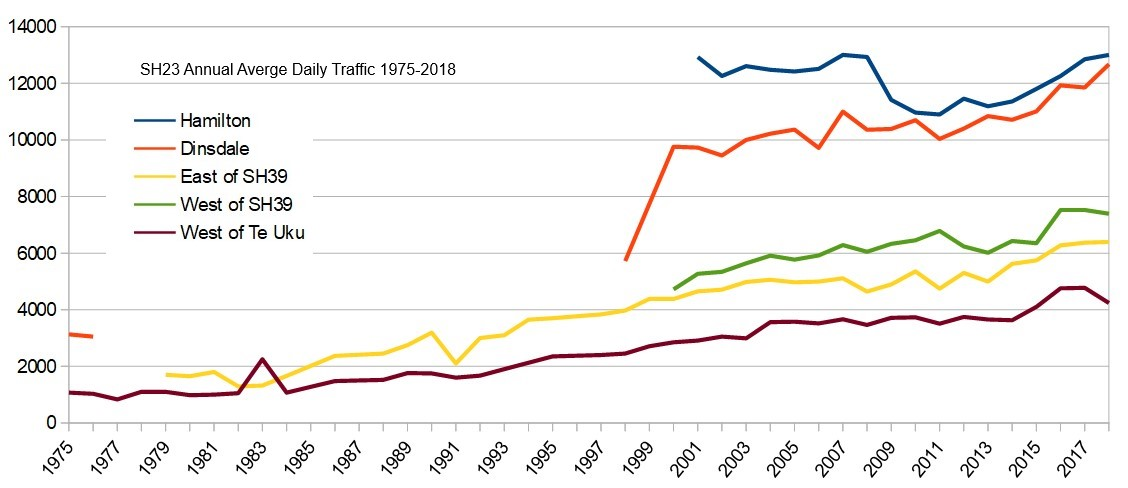

Average annual daily traffic records taken by the NZ Transport Agency measures the volume of traffic is measured at roughly 13,000 vehicles per day near the eastern terminus while at km 32 closer to Raglan the AADT is measured at roughly 4500 vehicles per day. SH 23 is classified by the NZTA as a primary collector highway as per the One Network Road Classification.

Traffic roughly quadrupled over the period 1975 to 2018, as shown in this table and the graph derived from it.

Location	20m West of Hawk St	40m East of Newcastle Rd, Dinsdale	880m East of Kakaramea Rd, Whatawhata	200m West of Maori Point Rd, Whatawhata	90m East of Wrights Rd, near Te Uku
1975		3130			1070
1976		3050			1030
1977					830
1978					1100
1979			1700		1100
1980			1650		980
1981			1800		1000
1982			1290		1050
1983			1320		2250
1984			1660		1070
1985					
1986			2370		1480
1987					
1988			2450		1520
1989			2750		1760
1990			3190		1750
1991			2100		1600
1992			3000		1670
1993			3100		1900
1994			3650		
1995			3700		2350
1996					
1997					
1998		5720	3970		2450
1999			4380		2710
2000		9760	4380	4720	2850
2001	12930	9730	4650	5270	2910
2002	12260	9450	4710	5340	3050
2003	12610	10000	4980	5640	2990
2004	12480	10220	5060	5910	3560
2005	12419	10365	4968	5771	3578
2006	12512	9720	4995	5918	3517
2007	13004	11001	5110	6284	3662
2008	12931	10360	4642	6048	3463
2009	11414	10389	4893	6328	3713
2010	10967	10696	5355	6452	3731
2011	10898	10037	4745	6786	3508
2012	11459	10402	5301	6235	3745
2013	11190	10842	4995	6013	3655
2014	11360	10711	5621	6429	3628
2015	11805	11008	5743	6350	4102
2016	12257	11928	6274	7522	4758
2017	12851	11854	6370	7525	4775
2018	13004	12676	6396	7393	4238
2019	14093	13764	6686	8287	5177
2020	11976	12334	6649	8127	4917

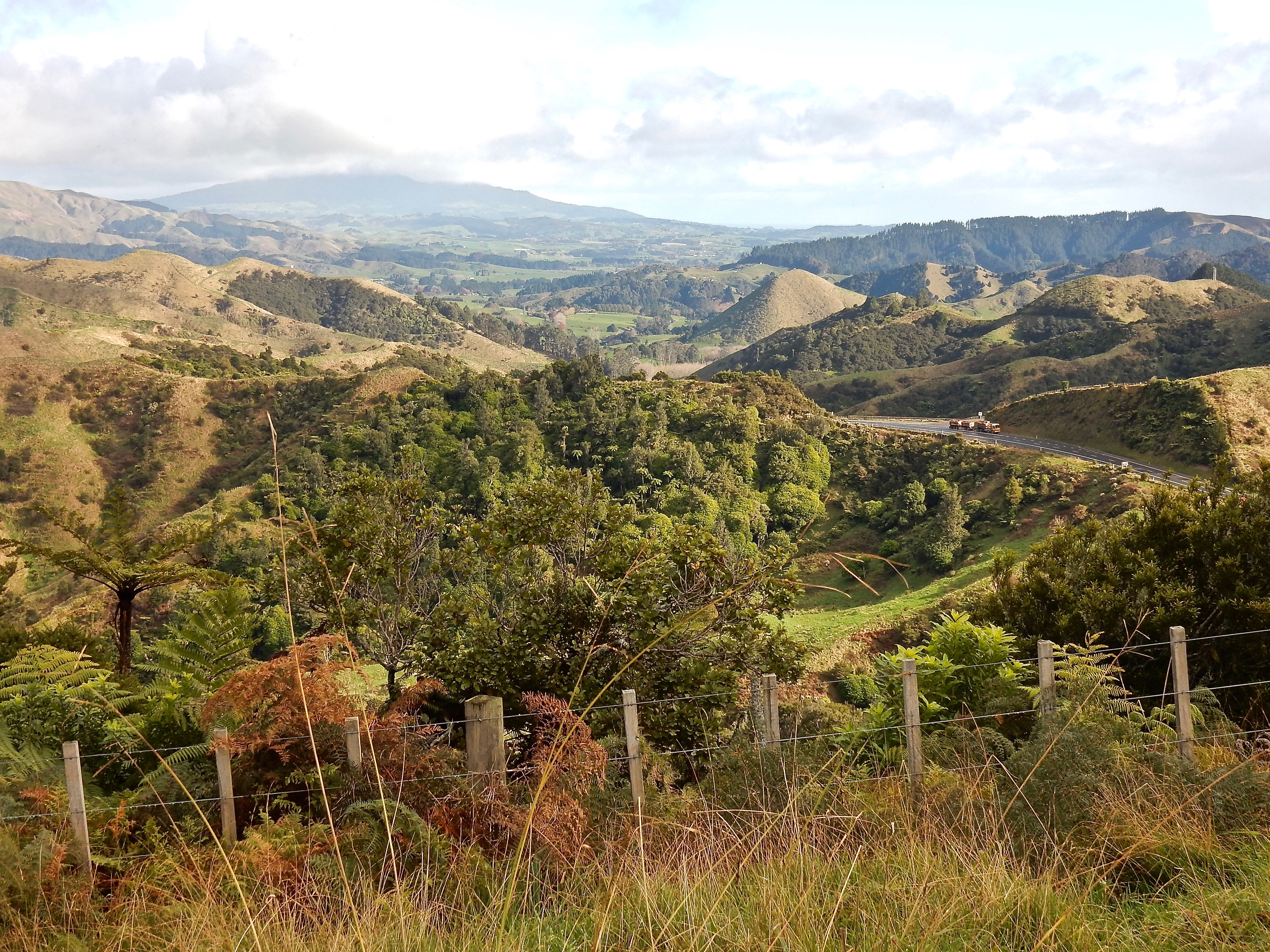
SH23 summit, logging truck, Waitetuna valley and Mt Karioi from Karamu Walkway

== Route changes ==
When SH 1 used to run through the Hamilton CBD, SH 23 began at the intersection of Mill Street and Ulster Street. When SH 1 was diverted westwards away from the CBD SH 23 was shortened to where its eastern terminus currently lies. In June 2021 the Raglan end was shortened by 1.09 km (0.68 mi), to a point near Greenslade Rd, so as to allow more development around the road and a lower speed limit. In July 2022, upon opening of the Hamilton section of the Waikato Expressway, SH 1 moved from its location through Lincoln and Greenwood Streets onto the expressway. The old designation of SH 1 through Hamilton was renumbered SH 1C.

== Speed limits ==
80 km/h (50 mph) limits apply at Whatawhata (extended westwards in 2012) and Te Uku (introduced in 2012).

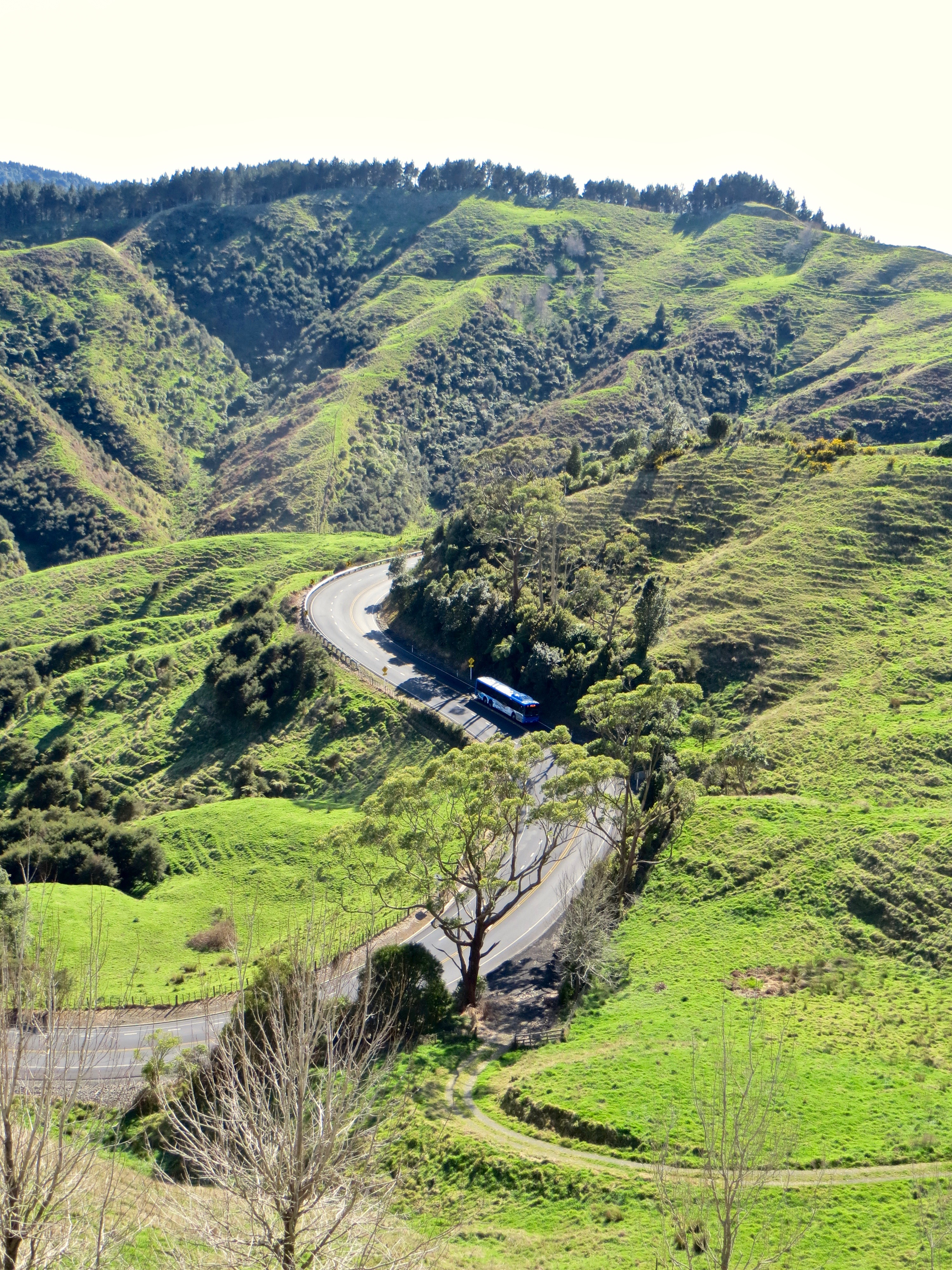
Hamilton-Raglan bus descending from 194 m (636 ft) summit. The road descends to 100 m (330 ft) in just over 1 km (0.62 mi).

== Safety ==
In the decade to 2016 there were 10 deaths and 64 serious injuries on SH23. 30% hit a roadside hazard, 40% hit an oncoming vehicle, 25% were at junctions, 47% involved alcohol and 48% driving too fast. Work by the Safe Roads Alliance in 2016/17 on 2 of the 3 sections of road is estimated to cost $13.2m.

== Public transport ==
A public bus service which traverses the length of SH 23 is provided by Waikato Regional Council.

== History ==
The road was gazetted a State Highway in 1961. In the same year tar-sealing of the road was completed. Prior to that, metalling had been completed in 1921.

Until 1863 the route was only passable on foot. By 1864, as part of the invasion of the Waikato, about six bridges were built to make it passable for pack horses. Conversion to a road began in 1878 and the first stage coach ran in March 1880, though the bridge over the Waipa wasn't started until late in 1880. Metalling of the road began after a poll in 1907 and deviations were built to shorten the route, including that over the summit, bypassing what is now Old Mountain Road, which was passable by 1912.

== Major intersections ==
Territorial authority	Location	km	mi	Destinations	Notes
Hamilton City	Hamilton	0	0.0	SH 1C north – Auckland; Massey Hall Overbridge – City Centre; SH 1C south – Taupō	SH 23 begins
Waikato District	Whatawhata			SH 39 south – Pirongia, Ōtorohanga	Staggered T-junction
Waikato District	Whatawhata			SH 39 north – Ngāruawāhia	Staggered T-junction
Waikato District	Raglan			Ohautira Road – Waingaro	Formerly SH 22
Waikato District	Raglan			Manukau Road	SH 23 ends
Concurrency terminus

== See also ==
- List of New Zealand state highways
