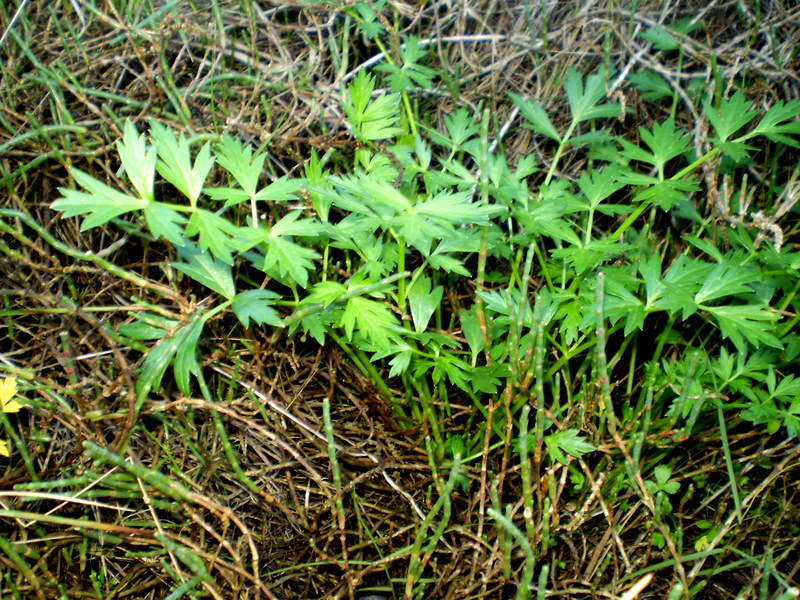

Scientific classification
- Kingdom: Plantae
- Clade: Tracheophytes
- Clade: Angiosperms
- Clade: Eudicots
- Clade: Asterids
- Order: Apiales
- Family: Apiaceae
- Genus: Apium
- Species: A. prostratum

Binomial name
- Apium prostratum Labill. ex Vent.

= Apium prostratum =

Sea celery

Species of plant

Apium prostratum, commonly known as sea celery, is a variable herb native to coastal Australia and New Zealand. The leaves are variable, with toothed leaflets, and a celery like aroma. The tiny white flowers occur in clusters.

There are two varieties:

- Apium prostratum var. filiforme – headland sea celery, squat with broad leaves (2-3 times longer than wide)and grows on coastal dunes and headlands.
- Apium prostratum var. prostratum – mangrove sea celery, upright with fine leaves (6-15 times longer than wide) and grows in swamps.

The subspecies Apium prostratum subsp. howense is endemic to Lord Howe Island.

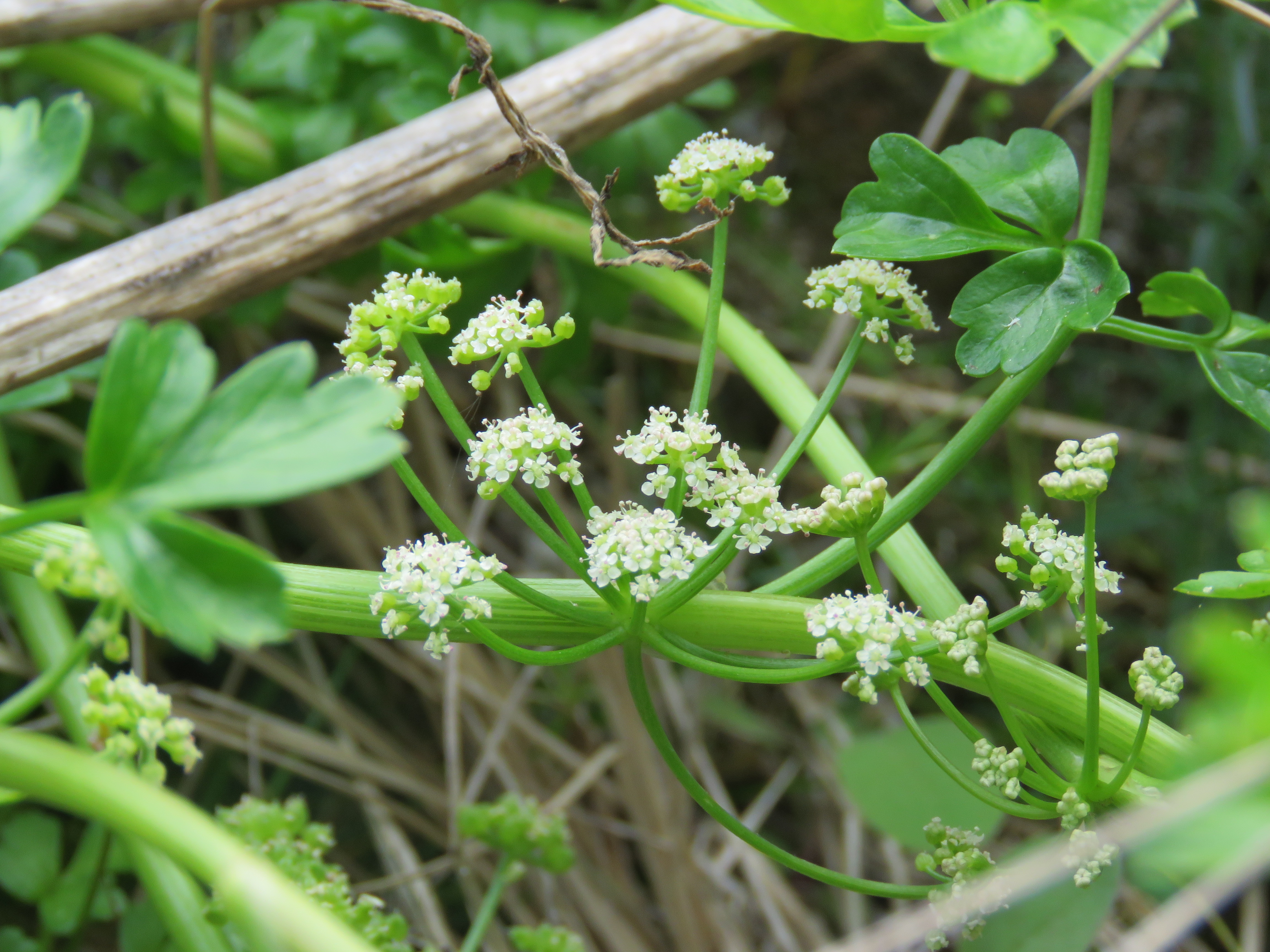
Apium prostratum var. filiforme (Headland Sea Celery) flowers and foliage on coastal hillside at Wainui, Banks Peninsula.

== Uses ==
Commonly eaten by Maori in New Zealand, for whom it is known as Tutae Koau, sea celery was also an important vegetable for early explorers and colonists in Australia and New Zealand. Captain Cook ate sea celery at Botany Bay and gathered it in bulk along with Lepidium oleraceum at Poverty Bay in New Zealand in October 1769 to protect his crew from scurvy. It was commonly eaten by colonists as a survival food in the early days of the Sydney colony.

Both leaf and stem are eaten. Dried leaves are used in native Australian spice mixes. It tastes much the same as celery and is used to flavour soups. Variety filiforme is considered to be more palatable.

It was cultivated by colonists around Albany, Western Australia, as a vegetable. It is commercially cultivated to a limited extent.
