= Sealed road =

Type of road

A sealed road is a road whose surface has been permanently sealed by the use of one of several pavement treatments, often of composite construction. In some countries, such as Australia and New Zealand, this surface is generically referred to as "seal".

Surface treatments used on sealed roads include:

- Asphalt concrete
- Chipseal
- Tarmac
- Bitumen

== See also ==
- Road surface
