= Waingaro River (Waikato) =

Coordinates: 37°44′36″S 174°57′30″E

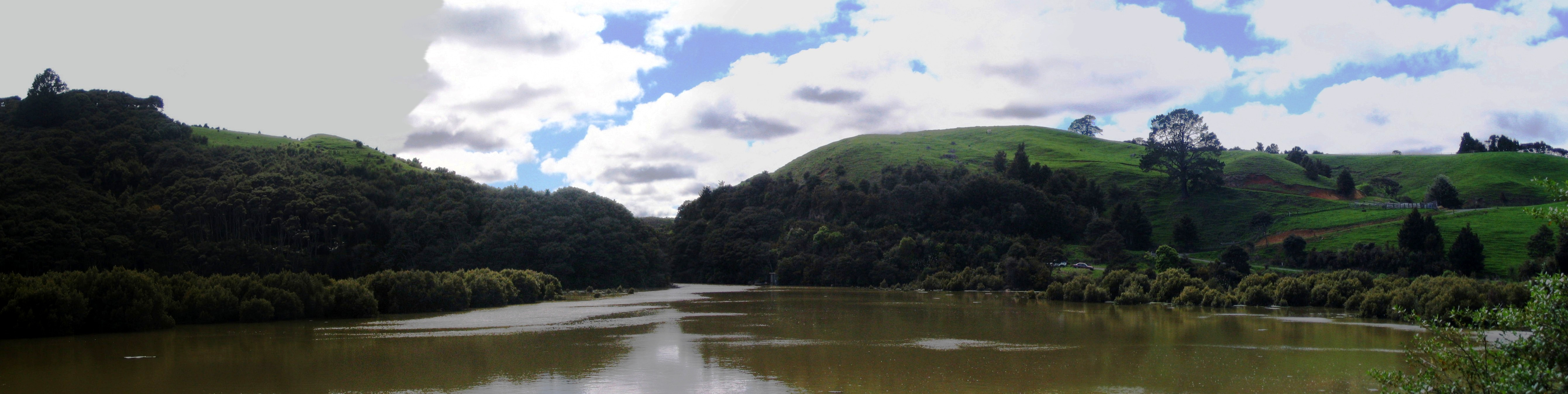
- Waingaro Landing and mangroves at mouth of Waingaro River

Location
- Country: New Zealand

Physical characteristics
- Source
  - elevation: 150 m (490 ft)
- Mouth
  - location: Raglan Harbour
  - elevation: 0 m (0 ft)
- Length: 18 km (11 mi)
- Basin size: 123 km^{2} (47 sq mi)

The Waingaro River is a river of the Waikato region of New Zealand's North Island. It flows generally southwest from its origins near Glen Afton and Glen Massey, west of Ngāruawāhia, to reach a northern arm of Raglan Harbour (see 1:50,000 map). Its main tributary is Kahuhuru Stream, which Highway 22 follows for several kilometres. Tributaries total about 170 kilometres (110 mi). At Waingaro it is fed by a hot spring.

== Geology ==
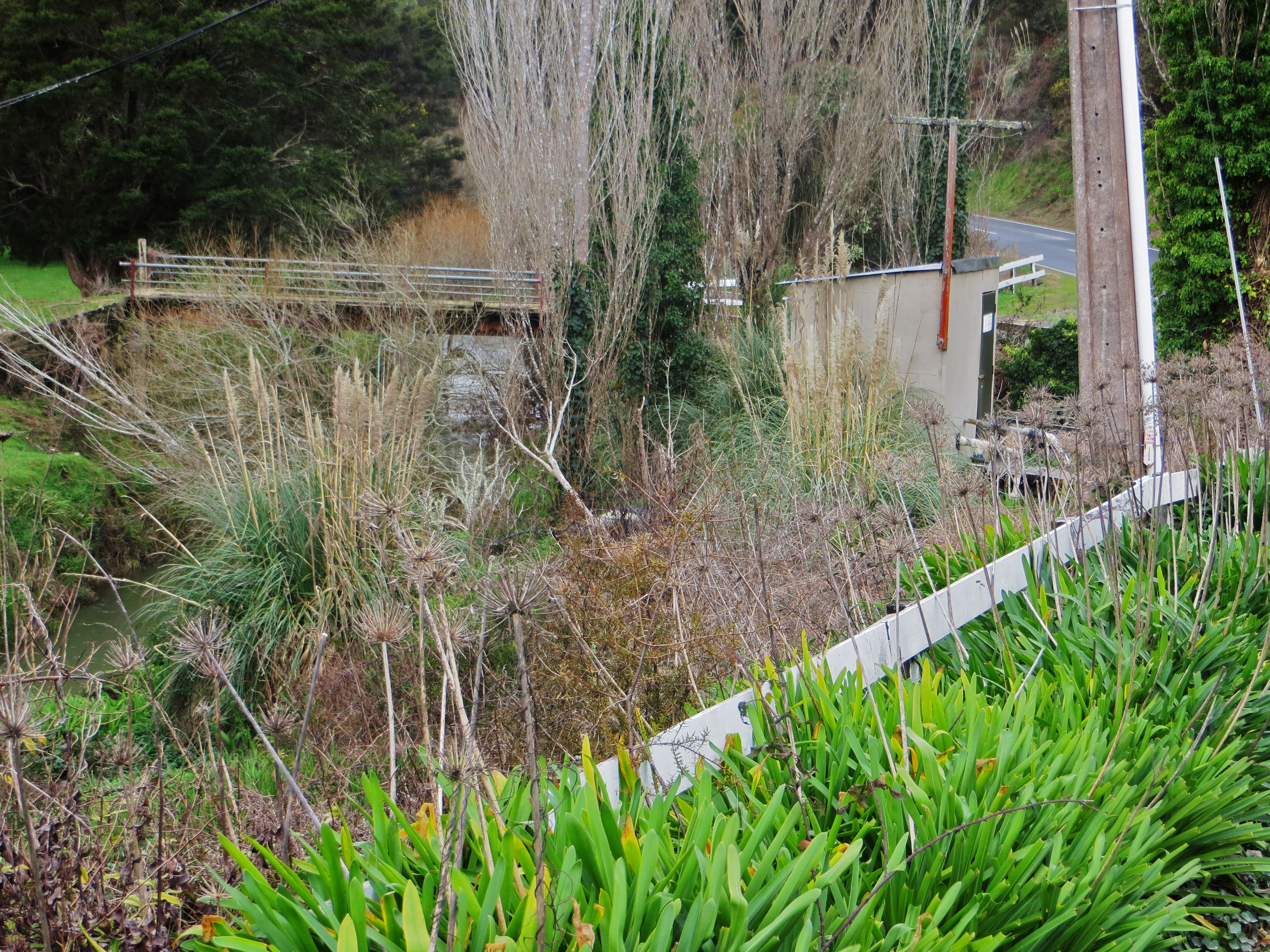
Waingaro River and hot water pump station - the pool was north of the road, but water is now pumped under the road.

The lower river flows over Puaroan age (about 150 million years ago), blue-grey Puti siltstone.

== Pollution ==
The Waingaro River is one of the largest sources of sediment in Whaingaroa Harbour, partly because it is 99 percent unfenced.

Pollution has been worsening for phosphorus, though nitrogen has improved, as shown in this table of important (i.e. slope direction probability over 95% and RSKSE over ±1% pa) improvements, or deteriorations (-) in relative seasonal Kendall slope estimator (RSKSE) trends (monthly records are flow-adjusted using a Lowess curve fit with 30% span.) - Turbidity is also poor.

| % per year | Nitrate-N | Total phosphorus | Dissolved reactive P |
|---|---|---|---|
| 1993–2017 | 1.0 | -1.0 | -1.0 |
| 2008–2017 | | -3.4 | |

== See also ==
- List of rivers of New Zealand
