= Wiremu Neera Te Awaitaia =

Te Awaitaia (used by permission of Auckland Art Gallery).

Wiremu Neera Te Awaitaia (c.1796 – 27 April 1866) was a Māori chief in New Zealand during first contact with European traders, the 1820s Musket Wars up to the 1860s New Zealand Wars. Born in or around 1796 into the Waikato Tribe of Ngāti Māhanga, he has been described as a "friend of Pākehā and a Chief of great influence" in the region of Raglan, New Zealand. He witnessed the coming of Christianity to Māoridom (specifically the Wesleyan missionaries to Raglan, James and Mary Wallis) in the mid-1830s, the sale of native land to the first European settlers, and the signing of the Treaty of Waitangi in the 1840s. Te Awaitaia also witnessed the Māori King Movement in the 1850s, and the New Zealand Wars in the 1860s. He died on 27 April 1866.

The name "Wiremu Neera" is the Māori phonetic rendering of the English name "William Naylor", which Te Awaitaia (his original name) took for himself to mark his conversion to Christianity in 1836. The monument that stands in Raglan, erected in his honor (on the western side of the harbour by the camping ground), spells his name as "Wiremu Nero Te Awaitaia" – other renderings of Naylor are Near, and Naera.

== Early years and intertribal conflict ==
Ngāti Māhanga, the tribe into which Te Awaitaia was born, was influential in the Waipa Valley and Waitetuna areas near Raglan. At some point early in Te Awaitaia's lifetime, his tribe is thought to have driven the Ngāti Koata from their lands near Whai-ngaroa (Raglan) Harbour. After this, the N Mahanga tribe became a member of the Waikato confederacy, which had been formed in response to the increasing influence and aggression of Ngāti Toa of Kawhia, which was led by the famous Chief of notorious and violent reputation, Te Rauparaha. Te Rauparaha was driven south away from his lands by the Waikato Confederacy and subsequently took control of much of the lower North Island of New Zealand and also carried out various other infamous invasions.

Te Awaitaia took a decisive part in the battle that drove Te Rauparaha south from Kawhia, heroically defeating one of the opposition leaders with an axe (teahatehwa), and obtaining much mana from the battle. He then led a party of 370 warriors that subsequently harried Rauparaha on his flight southwards. Te Awaitaia was also involved in the Battle of Motunui, which was a famous defeat of the Waikato Tribes. He was famous for his skillful use of his taiaha (see image) and was a Chief of great influence in the Waikato by the time of the arrival of the first (Methodist) missionaries in the mid-1830s.
