= Otaua =

- Locality
- Interactive map of Otaua
- Coordinates: 37.306397°S 174.740826°E
- Country: New Zealand
- Region: Waikato region
- District: Waikato District
- Wards: Awaroa-Maramarua General Ward; Tai Raro Takiwaa Maaori Ward
- Electorates: Port Waikato; Hauraki-Waikato (Māori)

Government
  - Territorial Authority: Waikato District Council
  - Regional council: Waikato Regional Council
  - Mayor of Waikato: Aksel Bech
  - Port Waikato MP: Matthew Paul
  - Hauraki-Waikato MP: Hana-Rawhiti Maipi-Clarke

Area
  - Territorial: 61.30 km^{2} (23.67 sq mi)

Population (2023 Census)
  - Territorial: 708
  - Density: 11.5/km^{2} (29.9/sq mi)
- Time zone: UTC+12 (NZST)
  - Summer (DST): UTC+13 (NZDT)

Otaua is a rural settlement in the Waikato District and Waikato region of New Zealand's North Island. It is located south of Waiuku and west of Aka Aka, on the northern side of the Waikato River. The Otaua area includes the Waikato North Head on the northern side of the Waikato River mouth, opposite Port Waikato to the south.

The Waikato North Head ironsand mine, just south of the settlement, produces up to 1.2 million tonnes of ironsand a year, for use in the New Zealand Steel mill at Glenbrook. The deposit is estimated to contain more than 150 million tonnes in total. The ironsand is processed on-site with a series of separation processes with river water, before the slurry is pumped to the Glenbrook mill through an 18-kilometre underground pipe.

The name Otaua is a contraction of Te Takanga-o-Tauaiwi, a reference to the falling of Tauaiwi, a descendant of Hotonui of the Tainui waka. Tauiwi was killed at Otaua by Tāmaki Māori and his body fell into a disused pit.

== History ==
=== Pre-European history ===
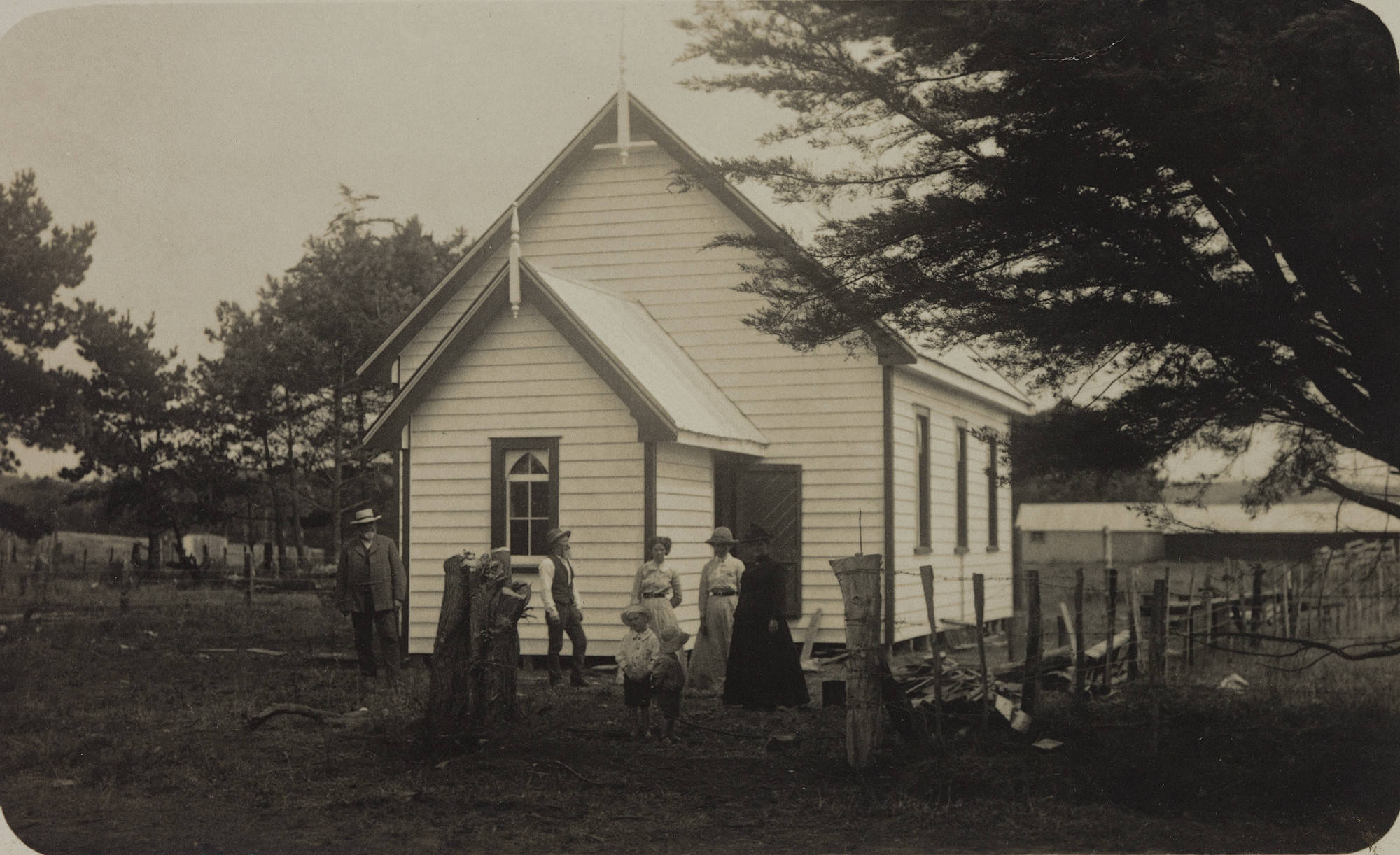
Undenomational church in Otaua, 1911

In the mid-1700s, the area was settled by Ngāti Te Ata, an iwi formed by the marriage of Te Atairehia of Te Wai-o-Hua, and Tapaue, a Tainui warrior. The coast alongside the Tasman Sea was settled by Ngāti Kahukōkā. Maioro, south-west of Otaua near the shoreline, is the site of a Ngāti Kahukōkā pā. The pā was first settled in the 1200s, becoming fortified with palisades in the 1400s and 1500s.

=== European settlement century ===
Otaua developed into a European farming settlement in the 1890s, with a school opening in 1895. The 360m² Otaua community hall was built in 1898. It has since been extensively renovated with modern fittings, and now features an outdoor deck area and tennis courts.

Otaua Second World War Roll of Honour was unveiled on the hall on 21 September 1946, commemorating the 43 local residents who had served in the war, including three who had died. Several Otaua servicemen from both wars are also listed in the Waiuku War Memorial Hall, including three who aren't included in the Otaua Roll of Honour.

On 20 November 1954, the Otaua District War Memorial Bowling Green was formally opened across the road. It features a modest pavilion that was replaced in 1963.

The bowling green entrance is an arch, with a granite memorial plaque reading:

In loving memory of

the men of the district

who fell in two world wars

1914–18 ― 1939–45.

== Demographics ==
Otaua covers 61.30 km^{2} (23.67 sq mi). It is part of the larger Aka Aka statistical area.

Historical population for Otaua and surrounds
Year	Pop.	±% p.a.
2006	372	—
2013	531	+5.22%
2018	621	+3.18%
2023	708	+2.66%
The 2006 population is for a smaller area of 51.57 km^{2}. Source:

Otaua had a population of 708 in the 2023 New Zealand census, an increase of 87 people (14.0%) since the 2018 census, and an increase of 177 people (33.3%) since the 2013 census. There were 360 males, 345 females and 3 people of other genders in 240 dwellings. 2.1% of people identified as LGBTIQ+. There were 153 people (21.6%) aged under 15 years, 102 (14.4%) aged 15 to 29, 330 (46.6%) aged 30 to 64, and 120 (16.9%) aged 65 or older.

People could identify as more than one ethnicity. The results were 94.1% European (Pākehā), 14.4% Māori, 2.1% Pasifika, 3.4% Asian, and 2.5% other, which includes people giving their ethnicity as "New Zealander". English was spoken by 99.2%, Māori language by 1.3%, and other languages by 3.8%. No language could be spoken by 1.3% (e.g. too young to talk). The percentage of people born overseas was 16.1, compared with 28.8% nationally.

Religious affiliations were 26.3% Christian, 0.4% Hindu, 0.4% Islam, 1.7% New Age, and 1.3% other religions. People who answered that they had no religion were 63.6%, and 6.8% of people did not answer the census question.

Of those at least 15 years old, 99 (17.8%) people had a bachelor's or higher degree, 342 (61.6%) had a post-high school certificate or diploma, and 114 (20.5%) people exclusively held high school qualifications. 105 people (18.9%) earned over $100,000 compared to 12.1% nationally. The employment status of those at least 15 was that 303 (54.6%) people were employed full-time, 93 (16.8%) were part-time, and 6 (1.1%) were unemployed.

== Notable residents ==
W. C. Motion was the son of William Motion. After moving to Otaua in the 1890s he became a Justice of the Peace and active member of the community. Motion served as chairman of the Otaua school committee, member of the Waipipi Road Board, director of the New Zealand Dairy Association, and a member of the Franklin County Council for the riding of Waipipi.

== Education ==
Otaua School is a co-educational state primary school for Year 1 to 8 students, with a roll of 222 as of July 2026.

The school opened in 1895 and held centennial celebrations in 1995.
