= Mercer, New Zealand =

Settlement in Waikato, New Zealand

Mercer
- Village
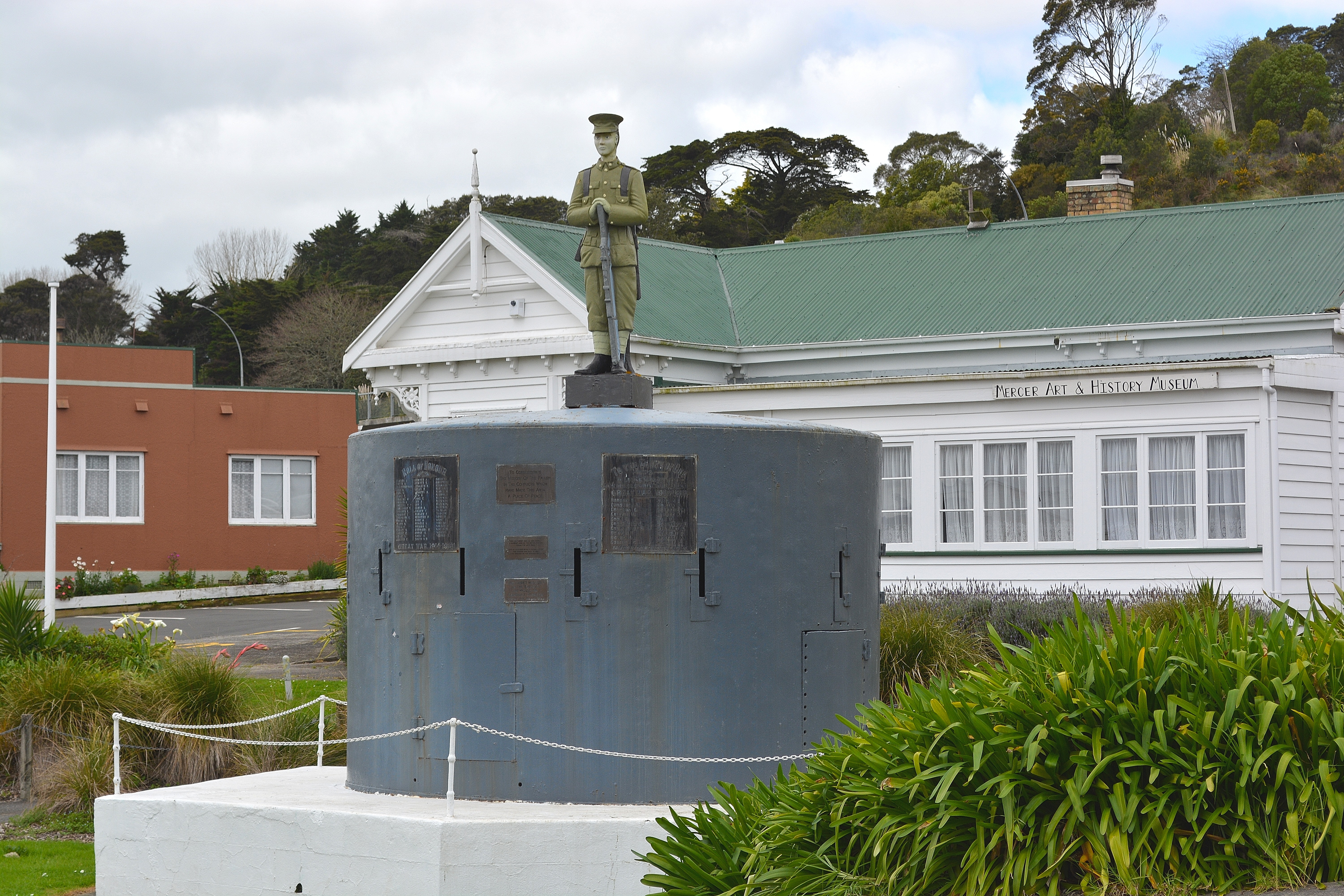
- Gun turret from British gunship "The Pioneer" used in Waikato War, 1863–1864
- Interactive map of Mercer
- Coordinates: 37.278°S 175.049°E
- Country: New Zealand
- Region: Waikato
- District: Waikato District
- Wards: Tuakau-Pōkeno General Ward; Tai Raro Takiwaa Maaori Ward
- Electorates: Port Waikato; Hauraki-Waikato (Māori)

Government
  - Territorial Authority: Waikato District Council
  - Regional council: Waikato Regional Council
  - Mayor of Waikato: Aksel Bech
  - Port Waikato MP: Matthew Paul
  - Hauraki-Waikato MP: Hana-Rawhiti Maipi-Clarke

Area
  - Territorial: 4.08 km^{2} (1.58 sq mi)
- Elevation: 20 m (66 ft)

Population (2023 census)
  - Territorial: 132
  - Density: 32.4/km^{2} (83.8/sq mi)
- Time zone: UTC+12 (NZST)
  - Summer (DST): UTC+13 (NZDT)

Mercer is a village in the Waikato District Council area of the Waikato region of the North Island of New Zealand. It is 70 km north of Hamilton and 58 km south of Auckland, on the east bank of the Waikato River, 2 km south of its confluence with the Mangatāwhiri River.

Prior to the creation of the Auckland supercity in 2010, Mercer was in Franklin District, part of the Auckland Region.

== History ==
The village of Mercer is named after Captain Henry Mercer, who was killed at Rangiriri in November 1863. The navy river gun-boat Pioneer was wrecked on the Manukau bar in 1866 and one of the gun turrets forms part of the war memorial.

The Mercer Road District was formed c.1877. Mercer became a town district in 1914 after the Mercer Road District amalgamated with Franklin County. The Mercer Town District was abolished in 1962.

The North Island Main Trunk railway opened to Mercer station on 20 May 1875. A crash in 1940 killed the driver and fireman. Until 1958 many trains stopped for refreshments. The station closed in 1986.

The beached hulls of steamers operated until 1976 by Caesar Roose can be seen on the west bank of the river just south of Mercer. W. Stevenson & Sons Ltd bought the remains of the Roose sand dredging business in the mid 1980s and, after dredging ended in 1997, redeveloped 2.5 ha (6.2 acres) of its yard with a petrol station and a food court.

=== Bridge ===
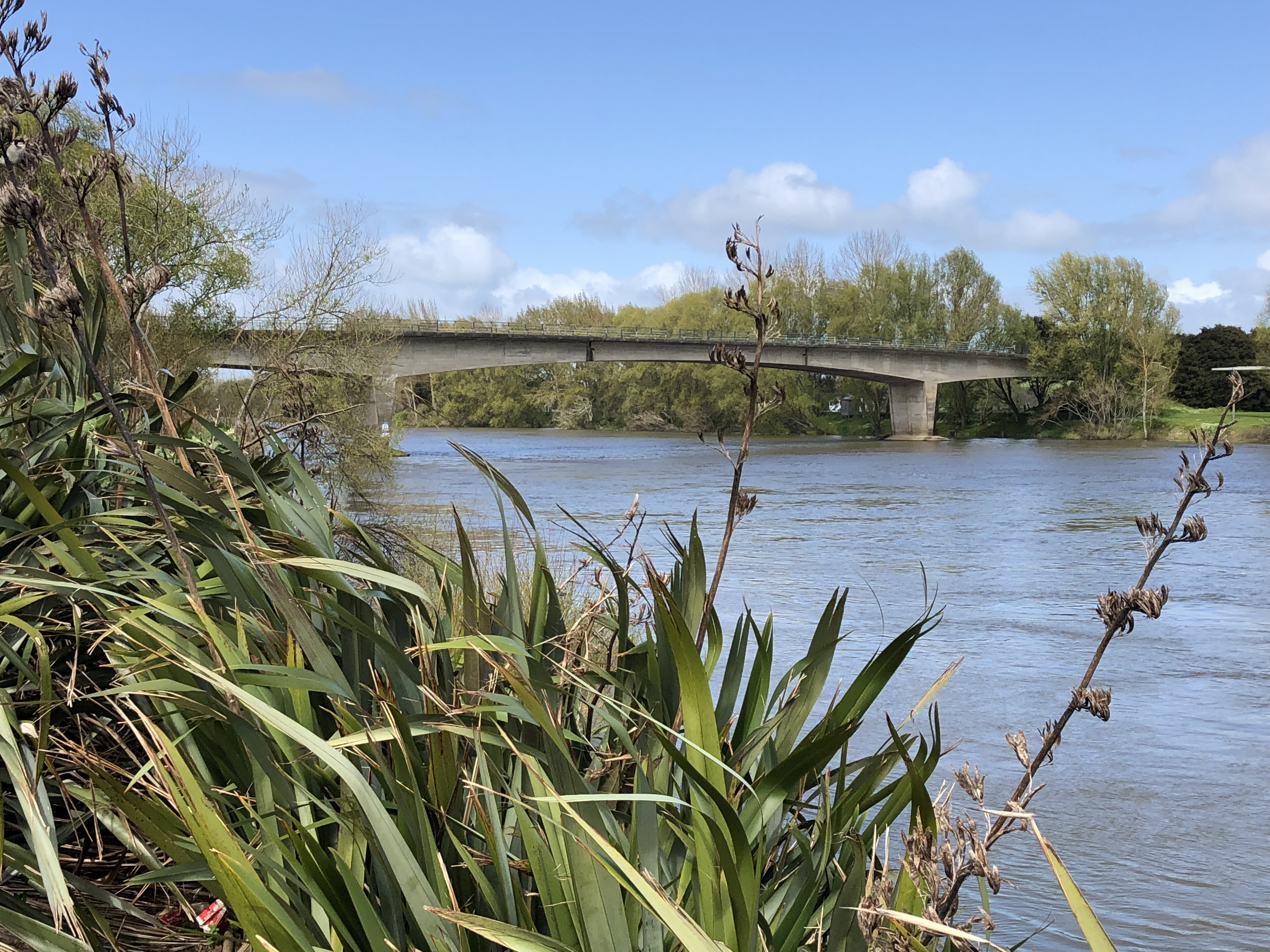
Mercer Bridge

In 1965 Roose offered $100,000 towards the $343,000 bridge to replace the Mercer ferry. The 480 ft (150 m) long single span concrete Caesar Roose Bridge was opened on 18 November 1972 by Roose's daughter, Jeanette Thomas, with the Minister of Works, Percy Allen.

== Demographics ==
Mercer is in an SA1 statistical area which covers 4.08 km^{2} (1.58 sq mi). The SA1 area is part of the larger Pōkeno Rural statistical area.

Historical population
Year	Pop.	±% p.a.
2006	105	—
2013	114	+1.18%
2018	123	+1.53%
2023	132	+1.42%

Mercer had a population of 132 in the 2023 New Zealand census, an increase of 9 people (7.3%) since the 2018 census, and an increase of 18 people (15.8%) since the 2013 census. There were 72 males and 60 females in 51 dwellings. The median age was 40.9 years (compared with 38.1 years nationally). There were 30 people (22.7%) aged under 15 years, 12 (9.1%) aged 15 to 29, 75 (56.8%) aged 30 to 64, and 18 (13.6%) aged 65 or older.

People could identify as more than one ethnicity. The results were 59.1% European (Pākehā), 36.4% Māori, 9.1% Pasifika, and 4.5% Asian. English was spoken by 97.7%, Māori language by 4.5%, and other languages by 13.6%. No language could be spoken by 2.3% (e.g. too young to talk). The percentage of people born overseas was 18.2, compared with 28.8% nationally.

Religious affiliations were 36.4% Christian, 2.3% Māori religious beliefs, and 2.3% other religions. People who answered that they had no religion were 54.5%, and 2.3% of people did not answer the census question.

Of those at least 15 years old, 6 (5.9%) people had a bachelor's or higher degree, 54 (52.9%) had a post-high school certificate or diploma, and 45 (44.1%) people exclusively held high school qualifications. The median income was $43,400, compared with $41,500 nationally. 15 people (14.7%) earned over $100,000 compared to 12.1% nationally. The employment status of those at least 15 was that 51 (50.0%) people were employed full-time and 12 (11.8%) were part-time.

== Education ==
Te Paina School is a co-educational state primary school for Year 1 to 8 students, with a roll of 64 as of July 2026. The school was founded in 1876 as Mercer School, and changed its name to Te Paina in 2021.

== Climate ==
Climate data for Mercer (1951–1980)
Month	Jan	Feb	Mar	Apr	May	Jun	Jul	Aug	Sep	Oct	Nov	Dec	Year
Mean daily maximum °C (°F)	23.8 (74.8)	24.4 (75.9)	22.8 (73.0)	19.9 (67.8)	17.0 (62.6)	14.6 (58.3)	13.8 (56.8)	14.8 (58.6)	16.2 (61.2)	17.9 (64.2)	19.7 (67.5)	21.8 (71.2)	18.9 (66.0)
Daily mean °C (°F)	18.5 (65.3)	18.8 (65.8)	17.2 (63.0)	15.0 (59.0)	12.0 (53.6)	10.0 (50.0)	9.2 (48.6)	10.4 (50.7)	11.7 (53.1)	13.6 (56.5)	14.9 (58.8)	16.8 (62.2)	14.0 (57.2)
Mean daily minimum °C (°F)	13.1 (55.6)	13.2 (55.8)	11.5 (52.7)	10.0 (50.0)	7.0 (44.6)	5.3 (41.5)	4.6 (40.3)	6.0 (42.8)	7.2 (45.0)	9.1 (48.4)	10.1 (50.2)	11.8 (53.2)	9.1 (48.3)
Average rainfall mm (inches)	51 (2.0)	75 (3.0)	77 (3.0)	98 (3.9)	97 (3.8)	123 (4.8)	144 (5.7)	116 (4.6)	77 (3.0)	87 (3.4)	81 (3.2)	63 (2.5)	1,089 (42.9)
Source: NIWA

== Former residents ==
- Allan Marshall (1851–1915), river captain
- Te Puea Hērangi (1883–1952), Māori leader
- Caesar Roose (1886–1967), ship owner and operator

== See also ==
- Waikato Expressway and State Highway 1
