= Pōkeno =

Town in Waikato, New Zealand

- Town
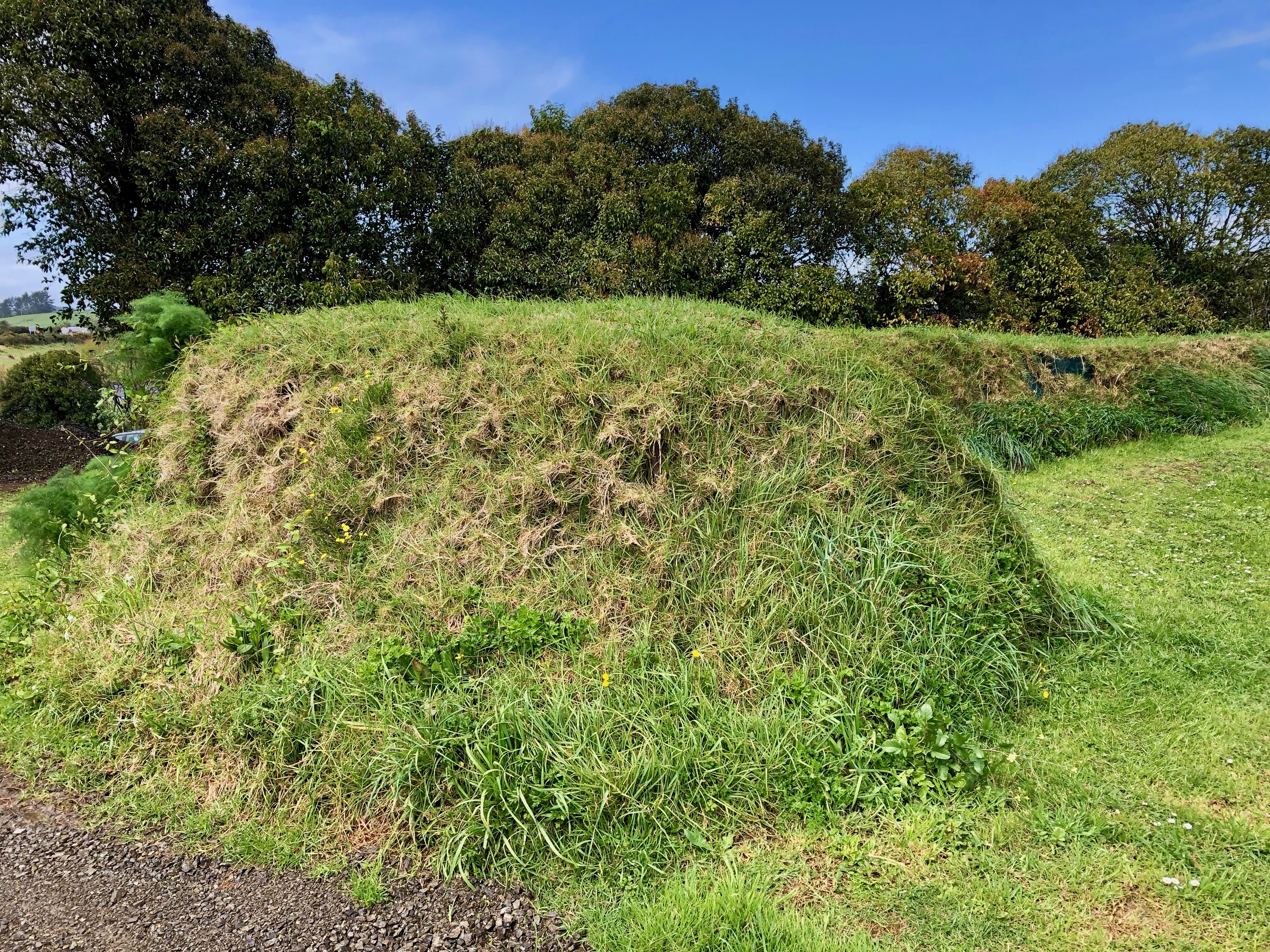
- Queen's Redoubt rampart
- Interactive map of Pōkeno
- Coordinates: 37°14′S 175°01′E
- Country: New Zealand
- Region: Waikato
- District: Waikato District
- Wards: Tuakau-Pōkeno General Ward; Tai Raro Takiwaa Maaori Ward
- Electorates: Port Waikato; Hauraki-Waikato (Māori)

Government
  - Territorial Authority: Waikato District Council
  - Regional council: Waikato Regional Council
  - Mayor of Waikato: Aksel Bech
  - Port Waikato MP: Matthew Paul
  - Hauraki-Waikato MP: Hana-Rawhiti Maipi-Clarke

Area
  - Territorial: 9.26 km^{2} (3.58 sq mi)
- Elevation: 40 m (130 ft)

Population (June 2025)
  - Territorial: 7,380
  - Density: 797/km^{2} (2,060/sq mi)
- Time zone: UTC+12 (NZST)
  - Summer (DST): UTC+13 (NZDT)
- Postcode: 2402
- Area code: 09

Pōkeno is a town in the Waikato District of the Waikato region in New Zealand, 53 km (33 mi) southeast of Auckland, 9 km (5.6 mi) from Tuakau and 5 km (3.1 mi) from Mercer. State Highway 1 originally ran through the town, but the upgrading of the highway in 1992 to expressway standards mean that the town has been bypassed.

== History ==
The town is named for the Ngāti Tamaoho settlement in the area called Pokino, located to the northwest of the current town centre. A military installation, Pokino Camp, was set up in the area in December 1861 after Governor George Edward Grey called for a road to be completed from Drury to the Waikato River, Great South Road. In mid-1862, work began on Queen's Redoubt, a military base which would become General Cameron's base of operations for the Invasion of the Waikato, housing 450 soldiers. The Māori village of Pokino to the north of Queen's Redoubt was deserted in July 1863 just prior to the start of the invasion (officially the village was listed as abandoned, though likely it had been ransacked by unauthorised soldiers). Queen's Redoubt was abandoned for military use in March 1867, with the buildings of the redoubt sold off by auction soon after.

The Pokeno Railway Station on the Waikato section of the North Island Main Trunk line was opened in 1875, but was closed in 1973 to passengers and in 1980 to goods. Work on the proposed Paeroa–Pokeno Line commenced in 1938 and whilst approximately 13 km of earthworks were completed at each end, the proposal was halted due to World War 2 and was not resumed following the war and was abandoned.

=== Havelock ===
In 1859 over 60 sections were put up for sale under the Auckland Waste Land Act 1858. After the sale it was reported "Thirty one lots in the village of Havelock, which has recently been laid out on the banks of the Waikato river, were in much request, the lots averaged from half an acre to an acre and 38 perches, and the whole fetched £339." Havelock and nearby Bluff Stockade were shown on an 1864 map. The planned roads and subdivisions are still shown on modern cadastral maps, though the plans for the township to become the capital of the Waikato came to nothing when the Great South Road was diverted to the east. In 2019 permission was sought to revive the subdivision in TaTa Valley, with 1,025 houses, a conference hotel, farm park and a ferry to Mercer.

==== Bluff Stockade ====
At the end of Bluff Road, where the original Great South Road reached the Waikato River, a 15 m (49 ft) x 14 m (46 ft) stockade was built in 1862 on an older pā, which probably had five terraces below the stockade. It secured the Te Ia landing place, which was used for supplies throughout the subsequent war. The site is now covered by trees.

== Government ==
Pōkeno was originally governed by the Pokeno Road District Board, which was established in 23 December 1869, before amalgamating with Franklin County in 1916.

== Demographics ==
Stats NZ describes Pōkeno as a small urban area. It covers 9.26 km^{2} (3.58 sq mi) and had an estimated population of 7,380 as of June 2025, with a population density of 797 people per km^{2}.

Historical population for the Pōkeno urban area
Year	Pop.	±% p.a.
2006	570	—
2013	693	+2.83%
2018	2,619	+30.46%
2023	6,081	+18.35%
The 2006 population is for a smaller area of 6.44 km^{2}. Source:

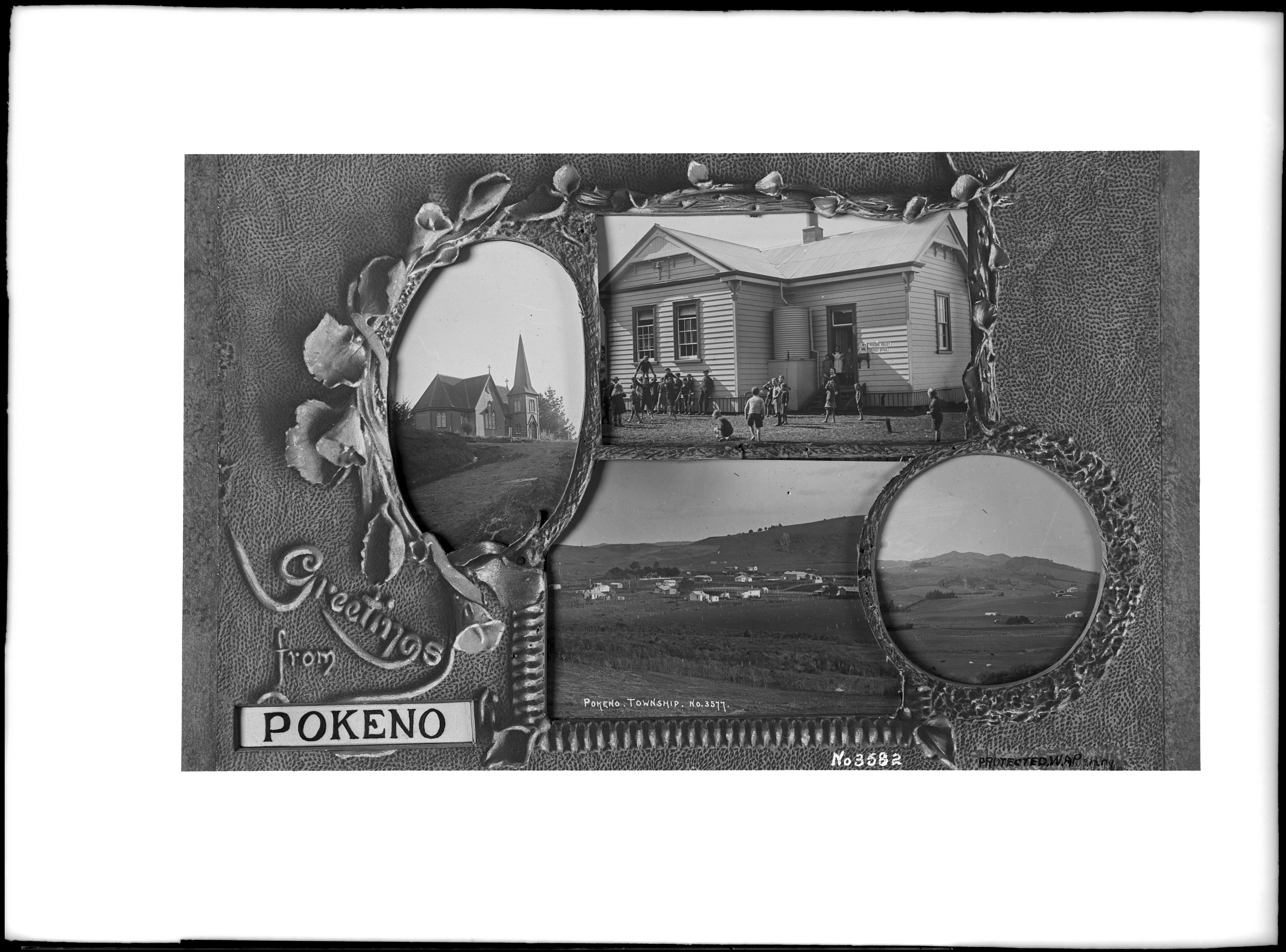
1900–1930 St Mary's Church, Pokeno Valley School and two general views

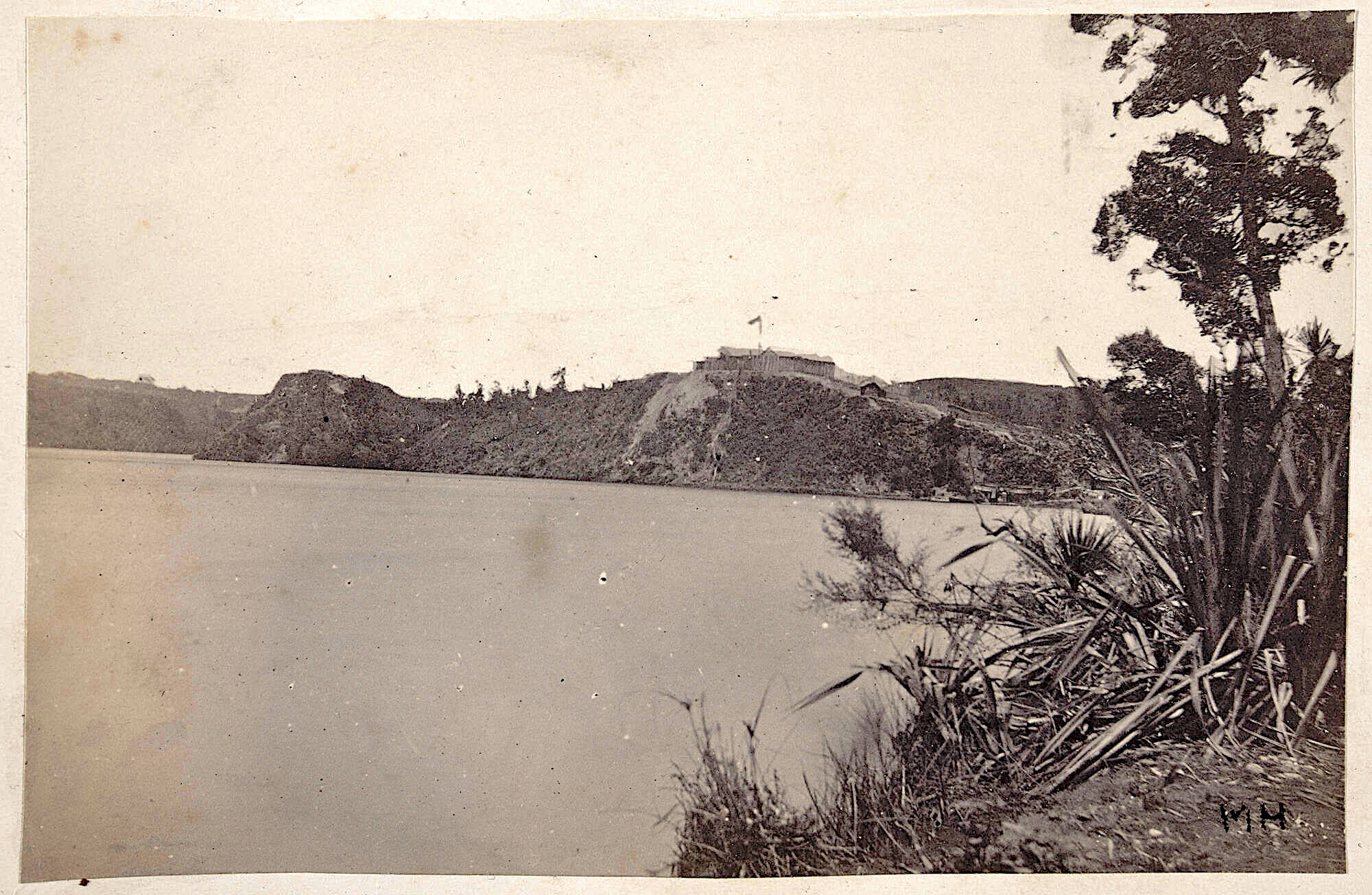
Bluff Stockade at Havelock's Bluff about 1863

Pōkeno had a population of 6,081 in the 2023 New Zealand census, an increase of 3,462 people (132.2%) since the 2018 census, and an increase of 5,388 people (777.5%) since the 2013 census. There were 3,042 males, 3,036 females and 6 people of other genders in 1,812 dwellings. 2.1% of people identified as LGBTIQ+. The median age was 33.9 years (compared with 38.1 years nationally). There were 1,488 people (24.5%) aged under 15 years, 1,035 (17.0%) aged 15 to 29, 3,087 (50.8%) aged 30 to 64, and 471 (7.7%) aged 65 or older.

People could identify as more than one ethnicity. The results were 52.5% European (Pākehā); 15.0% Māori; 9.1% Pasifika; 34.0% Asian; 3.3% Middle Eastern, Latin American and African New Zealanders (MELAA); and 3.7% other, which includes people giving their ethnicity as "New Zealander". English was spoken by 92.2%, Māori language by 2.9%, Samoan by 1.4%, and other languages by 30.4%. No language could be spoken by 3.8% (e.g. too young to talk). New Zealand Sign Language was known by 0.4%. The percentage of people born overseas was 43.6, compared with 28.8% nationally.

Religious affiliations were 31.7% Christian, 9.4% Hindu, 1.9% Islam, 0.6% Māori religious beliefs, 1.3% Buddhist, and 9.5% other religions. People who answered that they had no religion were 39.6%, and 6.2% of people did not answer the census question.

Of those at least 15 years old, 1,323 (28.8%) people had a bachelor's or higher degree, 2,199 (47.9%) had a post-high school certificate or diploma, and 1,065 (23.2%) people exclusively held high school qualifications. The median income was $57,800, compared with $41,500 nationally. 741 people (16.1%) earned over $100,000 compared to 12.1% nationally. The employment status of those at least 15 was that 2,973 (64.7%) people were employed full-time, 468 (10.2%) were part-time, and 132 (2.9%) were unemployed.

Individual statistical areas
Name	Area (km^{2})	Population	Density (per km^{2})	Dwellings	Median age	Median income
Pōkeno North	6.08	3,330	656	1,008	35.1 years	$56,600
Pōkeno South	4.18	2,754	659	807	32.7 years	$59,000
New Zealand					38.1 years	$41,500

=== Rural surrounds ===
Pōkeno Rural statistical area, which includes Mercer, covers 85.79 km^{2} (33.12 sq mi) and had an estimated population of 1,730 as of June 2025, with a population density of 20 people per km^{2}.

Historical population of rural surrounds
Year	Pop.	±% p.a.
2006	1,263	—
2013	1,284	+0.24%
2018	1,563	+4.01%
2023	1,728	+2.03%
The 2006 population is for a larger area of 88.63 km^{2}. Source:

Pōkeno Rural had a population of 1,728 in the 2023 New Zealand census, an increase of 165 people (10.6%) since the 2018 census, and an increase of 444 people (34.6%) since the 2013 census. There were 864 males, 861 females and 3 people of other genders in 567 dwellings. 2.4% of people identified as LGBTIQ+. The median age was 40.6 years (compared with 38.1 years nationally). There were 369 people (21.4%) aged under 15 years, 237 (13.7%) aged 15 to 29, 870 (50.3%) aged 30 to 64, and 252 (14.6%) aged 65 or older.

People could identify as more than one ethnicity. The results were 81.6% European (Pākehā); 18.1% Māori; 4.2% Pasifika; 8.9% Asian; 0.3% Middle Eastern, Latin American and African New Zealanders (MELAA); and 3.5% other, which includes people giving their ethnicity as "New Zealander". English was spoken by 96.5%, Māori language by 2.6%, and other languages by 10.2%. No language could be spoken by 2.1% (e.g. too young to talk). New Zealand Sign Language was known by 0.3%. The percentage of people born overseas was 21.2, compared with 28.8% nationally.

Religious affiliations were 30.4% Christian, 0.9% Hindu, 0.7% Islam, 0.7% Māori religious beliefs, 0.7% Buddhist, 0.7% New Age, and 1.4% other religions. People who answered that they had no religion were 56.9%, and 8.0% of people did not answer the census question.

Of those at least 15 years old, 240 (17.7%) people had a bachelor's or higher degree, 792 (58.3%) had a post-high school certificate or diploma, and 339 (24.9%) people exclusively held high school qualifications. The median income was $52,900, compared with $41,500 nationally. 273 people (20.1%) earned over $100,000 compared to 12.1% nationally. The employment status of those at least 15 was that 765 (56.3%) people were employed full-time, 186 (13.7%) were part-time, and 24 (1.8%) were unemployed.

== Education ==
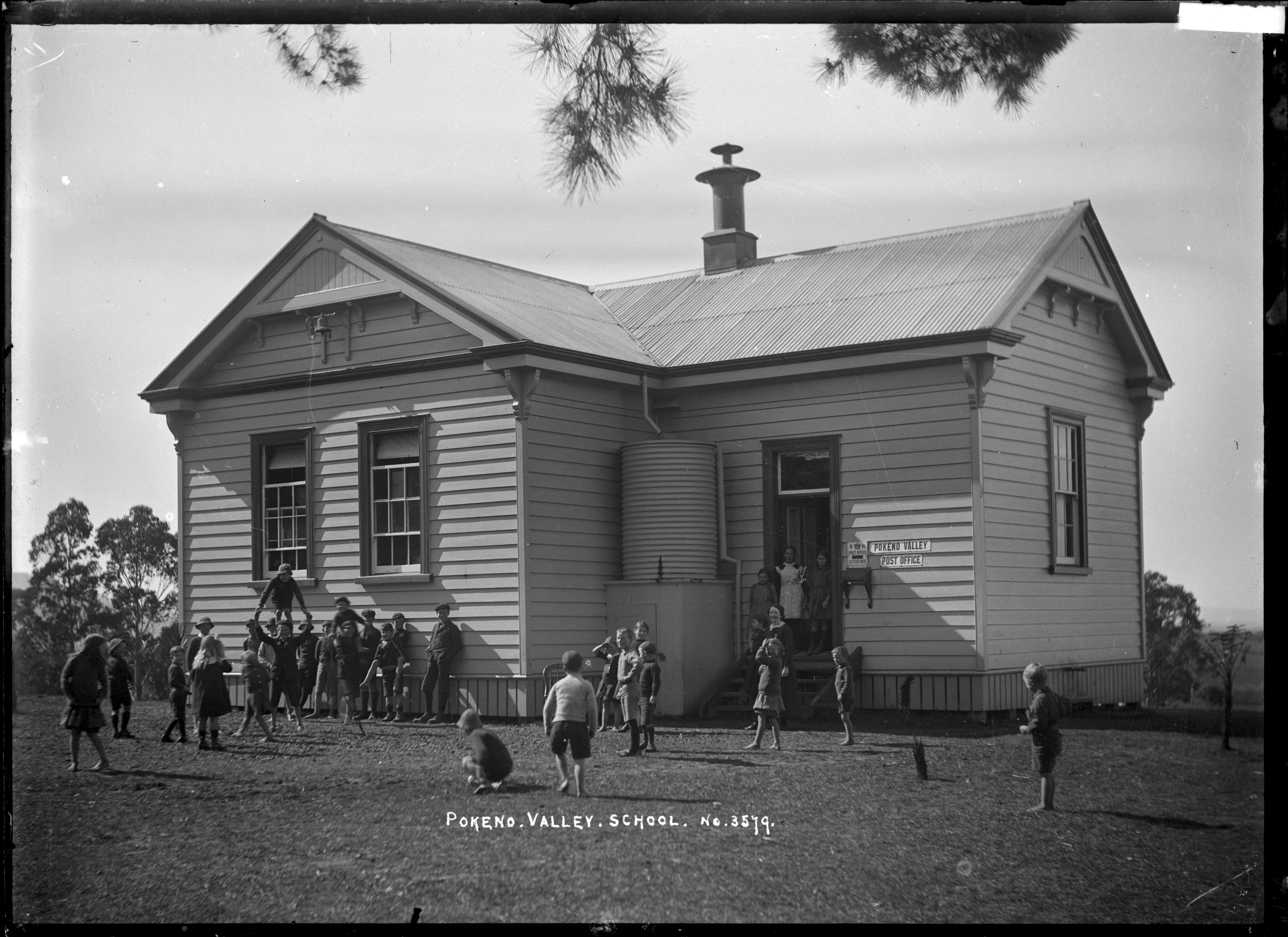
Pokeno Valley School in the early 20th century

Pokeno School is a co-educational state full primary school (years 1–8) with a roll of 671 as of July 2026. Three schools were established in the area in the 19th century: Pokeno Hill School in 1866, a school at Pokeno Redoubt in 1870, and Pokeno Valley School in 1878. The first two schools closed in 1888–89. In 1961, the Pokeno Valley School was replaced by the current school.

== In popular culture ==
- In the New Zealand film Goodbye Pork Pie, the fugitives steal fuel from the Pōkeno service station, now operating as a mobile home sales yard.
- Pōkeno is well known for its two competing ice cream shops, situated on the main road, where pricing and generous scoops have created almost a cult following.
- The former Thompson Twins member Alannah Currie, who was born in Auckland, now works as an artist under the name Miss Pokeno.
