= Aka Aka =

Locality in Waikato, New Zealand

- Locality
- Interactive map of Aka Aka
- Coordinates: 37.293°S 174.7926°E
- Country: New Zealand
- Region: Waikato region
- District: Waikato District
- Wards: Awaroa-Maramarua General Ward; Tai Raro Takiwaa Maaori Ward
- Electorates: Port Waikato; Hauraki-Waikato (Māori)

Government
  - Territorial Authority: Waikato District Council
  - Regional council: Waikato Regional Council
  - Mayor of Waikato: Aksel Bech
  - Port Waikato MP: Matthew Paul
  - Hauraki-Waikato MP: Hana-Rawhiti Maipi-Clarke

Area
  - Territorial: 59.39 km^{2} (22.93 sq mi)
- Elevation: 30 m (98 ft)

Population (2023 Census)
  - Territorial: 699
  - Density: 11.8/km^{2} (30.5/sq mi)
- Time zone: UTC+12 (NZST)
  - Summer (DST): UTC+13 (NZDT)

Aka Aka is a rural locality on the Aka Aka Stream, a tributary of the Waikato River. It lies about 7 km southeast of Waiuku.

The area was originally a swamp, drained in the late 19th century.

The New Zealand Co-operative Dairy Company has a factory in Aka Aka, built in 1901.

The current Aka Aka Hall, opened in 2002, contains a Roll of Honour commemorating people from the area killed in the first and second world wars. The hall replaced one which was described as a "splendid new hall" in 1912.

== Demographics ==
Aka Aka locality is in five SA1 statistical areas which cover 59.39 km^{2} (22.93 sq mi) The SA1 areas are part of the larger Aka Aka statistical area.

Historical population for Aka Aka locality
Year	Pop.	±% p.a.
2013	576	—
2018	678	+3.31%
2023	699	+0.61%

The locality had a population of 699 in the 2023 New Zealand census, an increase of 21 people (3.1%) since the 2018 census, and an increase of 123 people (21.4%) since the 2013 census. There were 357 males, 345 females and 3 people of other genders in 261 dwellings. 2.6% of people identified as LGBTIQ+. There were 120 people (17.2%) aged under 15 years, 129 (18.5%) aged 15 to 29, 357 (51.1%) aged 30 to 64, and 96 (13.7%) aged 65 or older.

People could identify as more than one ethnicity. The results were 90.1% European (Pākehā), 14.6% Māori, 5.6% Pasifika, 4.3% Asian, and 1.7% other, which includes people giving their ethnicity as "New Zealander". English was spoken by 97.4%, Māori language by 2.6%, and other languages by 6.4%. No language could be spoken by 2.1% (e.g. too young to talk). The percentage of people born overseas was 14.2, compared with 28.8% nationally.

Religious affiliations were 24.5% Christian, 0.9% Hindu, 0.4% Islam, 0.4% New Age, and 0.9% other religions. People who answered that they had no religion were 64.8%, and 9.4% of people did not answer the census question.

Of those at least 15 years old, 81 (14.0%) people had a bachelor's or higher degree, 375 (64.8%) had a post-high school certificate or diploma, and 129 (22.3%) people exclusively held high school qualifications. 90 people (15.5%) earned over $100,000 compared to 12.1% nationally. The employment status of those at least 15 was that 342 (59.1%) people were employed full-time, 90 (15.5%) were part-time, and 6 (1.0%) were unemployed.

=== Aka Aka statistical area ===
Aka Aka statistical area covers all of the Waikato District north of the Waikato River and west of the Tutaenui Stream, and includes Otaua. It covers 186.94 km^{2} (72.18 sq mi) and had an estimated population of 3,510 as of June 2025, with a population density of 19 people per km^{2}.

Historical population for the Aka Aka statistical area
Year	Pop.	±% p.a.
2006	2,556	—
2013	2,637	+0.45%
2018	3,102	+3.30%
2023	3,360	+1.61%

Aka Aka had a population of 3,360 in the 2023 New Zealand census, an increase of 258 people (8.3%) since the 2018 census, and an increase of 723 people (27.4%) since the 2013 census. There were 1,713 males, 1,641 females and 9 people of other genders in 1,170 dwellings. 2.1% of people identified as LGBTIQ+. The median age was 41.2 years (compared with 38.1 years nationally). There were 645 people (19.2%) aged under 15 years, 564 (16.8%) aged 15 to 29, 1,617 (48.1%) aged 30 to 64, and 531 (15.8%) aged 65 or older.

People could identify as more than one ethnicity. The results were 90.2% European (Pākehā); 14.3% Māori; 3.5% Pasifika; 4.3% Asian; 0.2% Middle Eastern, Latin American and African New Zealanders (MELAA); and 2.9% other, which includes people giving their ethnicity as "New Zealander". English was spoken by 97.9%, Māori language by 2.1%, Samoan by 0.3%, and other languages by 6.8%. No language could be spoken by 1.3% (e.g. too young to talk). New Zealand Sign Language was known by 0.2%. The percentage of people born overseas was 16.2, compared with 28.8% nationally.

Religious affiliations were 25.4% Christian, 0.5% Hindu, 0.6% Islam, 0.3% Māori religious beliefs, 0.2% Buddhist, 0.6% New Age, 0.1% Jewish, and 1.3% other religions. People who answered that they had no religion were 62.4%, and 8.7% of people did not answer the census question.

Of those at least 15 years old, 429 (15.8%) people had a bachelor's or higher degree, 1,671 (61.5%) had a post-high school certificate or diploma, and 612 (22.5%) people exclusively held high school qualifications. The median income was $47,700, compared with $41,500 nationally. 459 people (16.9%) earned over $100,000 compared to 12.1% nationally. The employment status of those at least 15 was that 1,524 (56.1%) people were employed full-time, 429 (15.8%) were part-time, and 39 (1.4%) were unemployed.

== Education ==
Aka Aka School is a co-educational state primary school covering years 1 to 8, with a roll of 46 as of July 2026.

There is also a primary school at Otaua.
