= Waikaretu =

Locality in Waikato, New Zealand

Waikaretu Waikāretu
- Hamlet
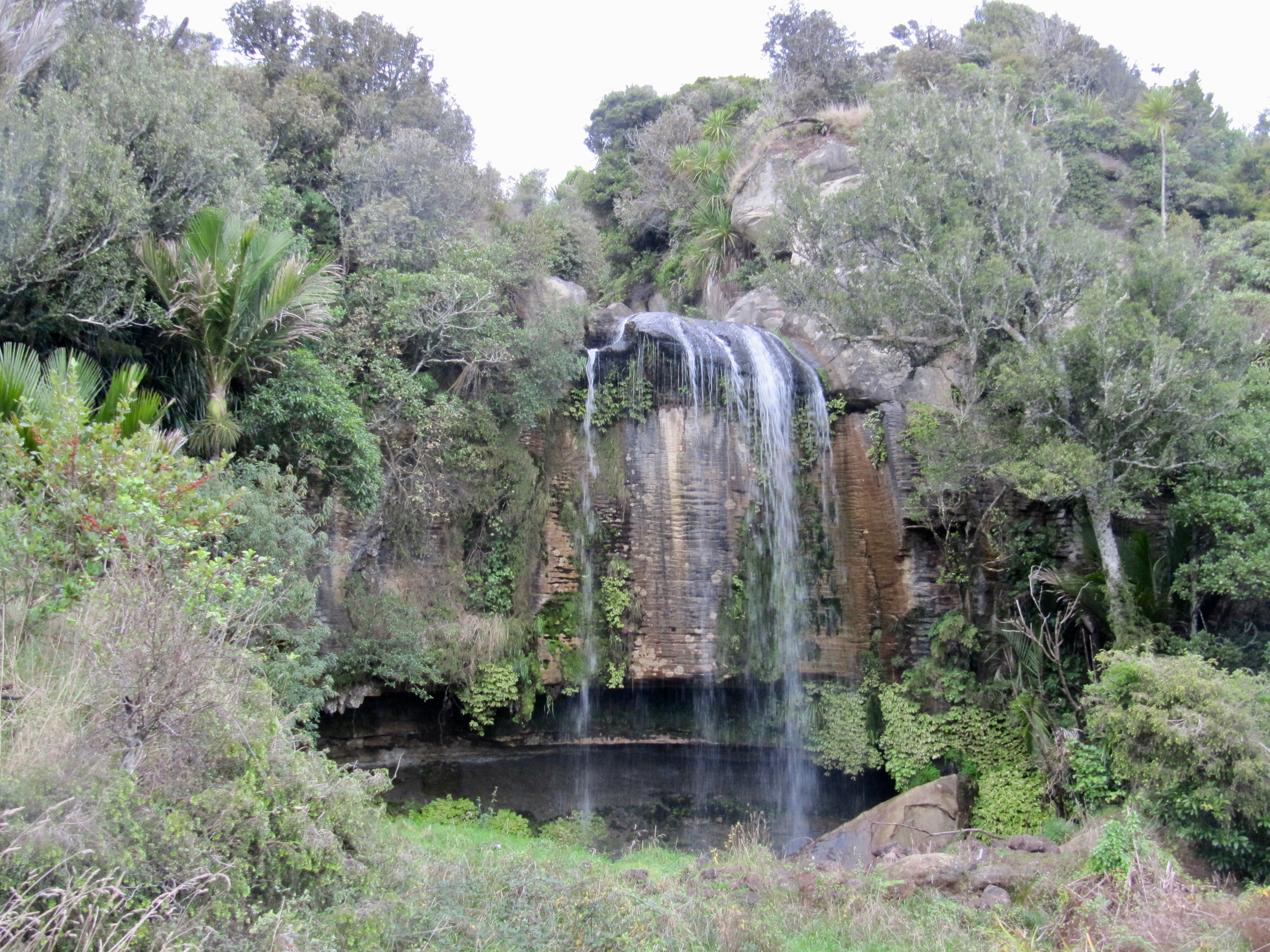
- Waikapakapa Stream waterfall, Waikaretu
- Interactive map of Waikaretu
- Coordinates: 37.54120°S 174.82918°E
- Country: New Zealand
- Region: Waikato
- District: Waikato District
- Wards: Western Districts General Ward; Tai Raro Takiwaa Maaori Ward
- Community: Rural-Port Waikato Community
- Electorates: Port Waikato; Hauraki-Waikato (Māori)

Government
  - Territorial Authority: Waikato District Council
  - Regional council: Waikato Regional Council
  - Mayor of Waikato: Aksel Bech
  - Port Waikato MP: Matthew Paul
  - Hauraki-Waikato MP: Hana-Rawhiti Maipi-Clarke

Area
  - Total: 133.50 km^{2} (51.54 sq mi)

Population (2023)
  - Total: 120
  - Density: 0.90/km^{2} (2.3/sq mi)

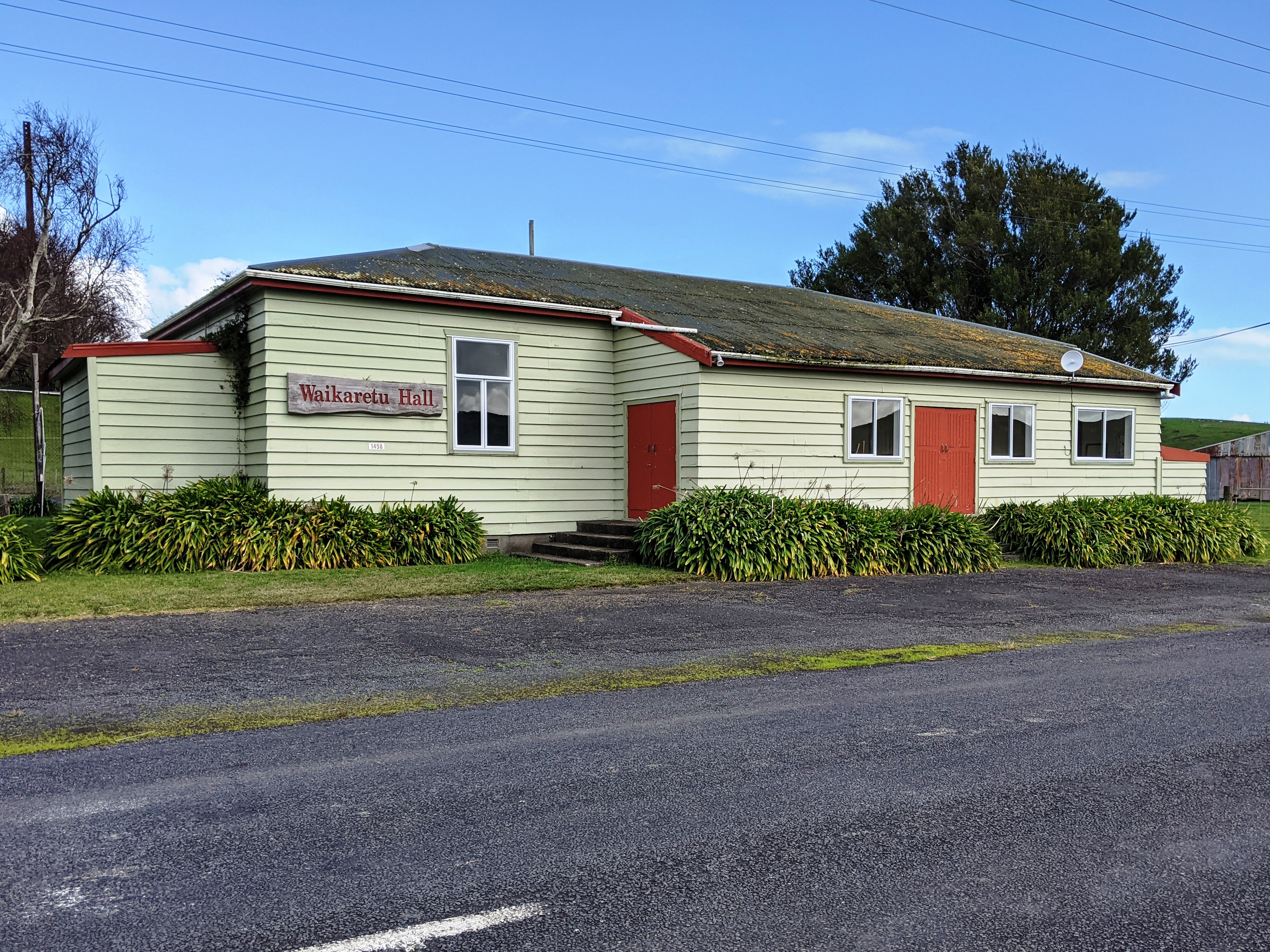
Waikaretu Hall

Waikaretu (Māori: Waikāretu) is a rural community and caving area in the Waikato District and Waikato region of New Zealand's North Island. It is located 49 kilometres south-west of Tuakau.

A local farmstay also provides guided horse treks.

Waikāretu translates as "waters of the kāretu grass"; wai means water; and kāretu is a sweet-scented grass.

== History ==
=== 20th century ===
The current Waikaretu settlement was established with the opening of a local school in 1924.

The Waikaretu War Memorial Hall was built in 1952. It has no Roll of Honour, but includes a plaque commemorating those who served in both World War I and World War II.

=== 21st century ===
By the 2010s the area featured several dairy farms, including the third-generation Whitford farm.

In 2016, the Overseas Investment Office granted a Chinese company, Weihai Station, approval to buy 595 hectares of coastal land. Part of the land will be used for a lodge and training facility, with the rest continuing to operate as a sheep and beef farm. The company gave Waikaretu School $25,000 in grants between 2016 and 2020.

Also in 2016, a secretive group began tunneling into the side of road searching for the skeletons of a mythical race of pre-Polynesian giants. They called off the search in February 2020, after iwi, academics and the landowner raised concerns about the dig.

== Nikau Cave ==
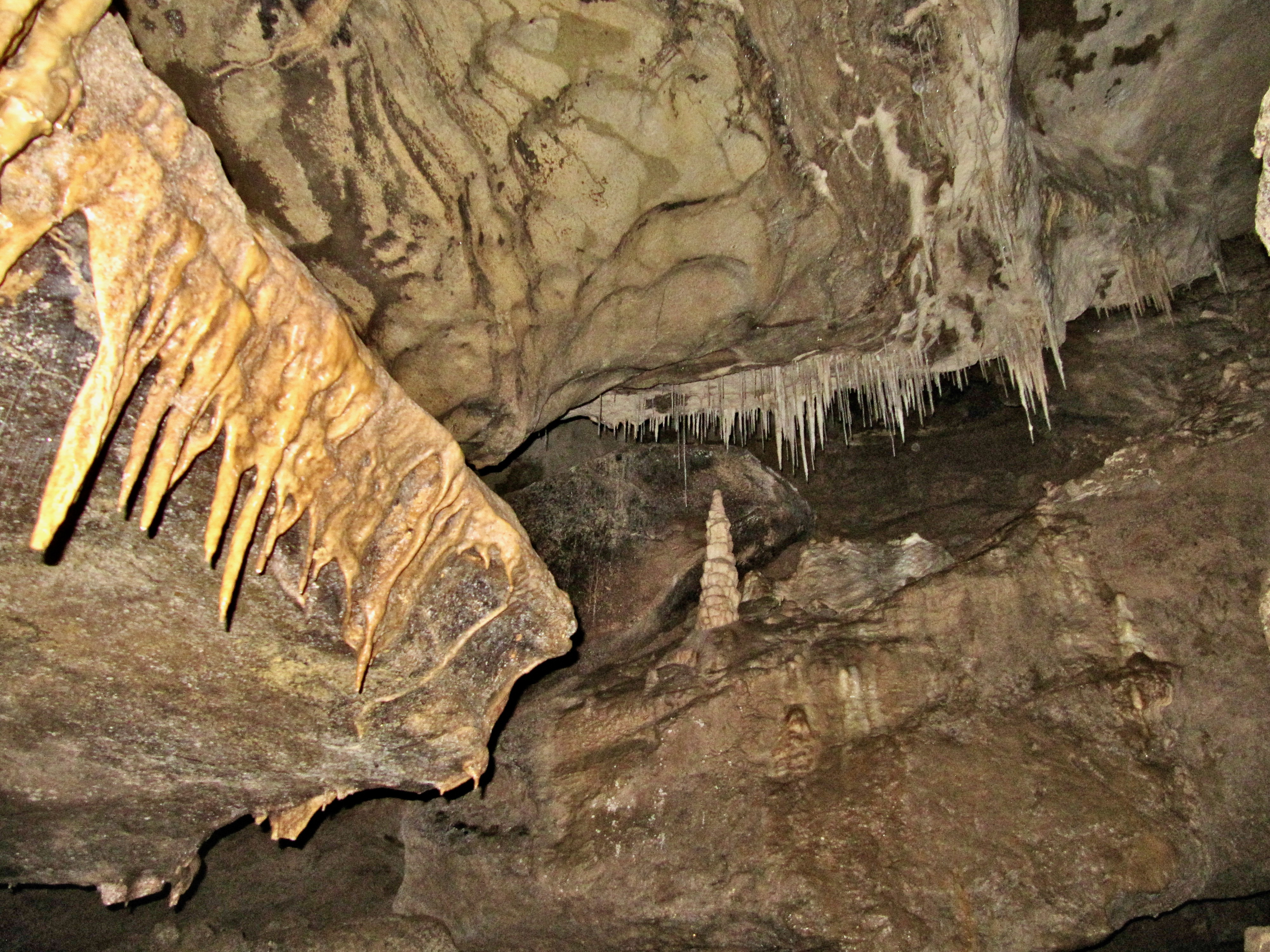
Stalactites and stalagmites in Nikau Cave

The area features the 1 kilometre (0.62 mi) long Nikau Cave, named after nīkau forest, with limestone pillars, stalactites and stalagmites. The caves contain many thousands of glow-worms which visitors can observe up close. Ninety minute guided adventure tours are available, which are often wet and muddy. There is a visitor cafe, and there are several accommodation options nearby. A British analysis of TripAdvisor reviews in 2020 identified the cave as one of New Zealand's best secret tourist spots.

Philip and Anne Woodward moved to the area in 1978, purchasing a 204 hectare sheep and dairy farm that included Nikau Cave. They opened the cave to the public in 1994, after their farming lease on a neighbouring 242 hectare block ended and they could no longer make enough money from farming and shearing services. The cave has been formed in Waimai Limestone, which is about 28m years old, hard, flaggy, glauconitic, pebbly and over 90% formed of calcium carbonate. There is also a path beside Waikaretu Stream, through QEII protected areas of bush, from near the cave to the foot of a waterfall.

== Demographics ==
Waikaretu is in an SA1 statistical area which covers 133.50 km^{2} (51.54 sq mi). The SA1 area is part of the larger Port Waikato-Waikaretu statistical area.

Historical population
Year	Pop.	±% p.a.
2006	111	—
2013	129	+2.17%
2018	141	+1.79%
2023	120	−3.17%

7011061 had a population of 120 in the 2023 New Zealand census, a decrease of 21 people (−14.9%) since the 2018 census, and a decrease of 9 people (−7.0%) since the 2013 census. There were 63 males, 60 females and 3 people of other genders in 42 dwellings. 2.5% of people identified as LGBTIQ+. The median age was 35.5 years (compared with 38.1 years nationally). There were 21 people (17.5%) aged under 15 years, 27 (22.5%) aged 15 to 29, 54 (45.0%) aged 30 to 64, and 15 (12.5%) aged 65 or older.

People could identify as more than one ethnicity. The results were 77.5% European (Pākehā), 47.5% Māori, 2.5% Pasifika, and 5.0% other, which includes people giving their ethnicity as "New Zealander". English was spoken by 100.0%, and Māori language by 12.5%. No language could be spoken by 2.5% (e.g. too young to talk). New Zealand Sign Language was known by 2.5%. The percentage of people born overseas was 5.0, compared with 28.8% nationally.

Religious affiliations were 22.5% Christian, and 2.5% other religions. People who answered that they had no religion were 70.0%, and 7.5% of people did not answer the census question.

Of those at least 15 years old, 15 (15.2%) people had a bachelor's or higher degree, 60 (60.6%) had a post-high school certificate or diploma, and 21 (21.2%) people exclusively held high school qualifications. The median income was $36,100, compared with $41,500 nationally. 6 people (6.1%) earned over $100,000 compared to 12.1% nationally. The employment status of those at least 15 was that 51 (51.5%) people were employed full-time, 18 (18.2%) were part-time, and 6 (6.1%) were unemployed.

== Education ==
Waikaretu School is a co-educational state primary school for Year 1 to 8 students, with a roll of 20 as of July 2026. The school opened in 1924.
