= Rotokauri =

Locality in Waikato, New Zealand

- Locality
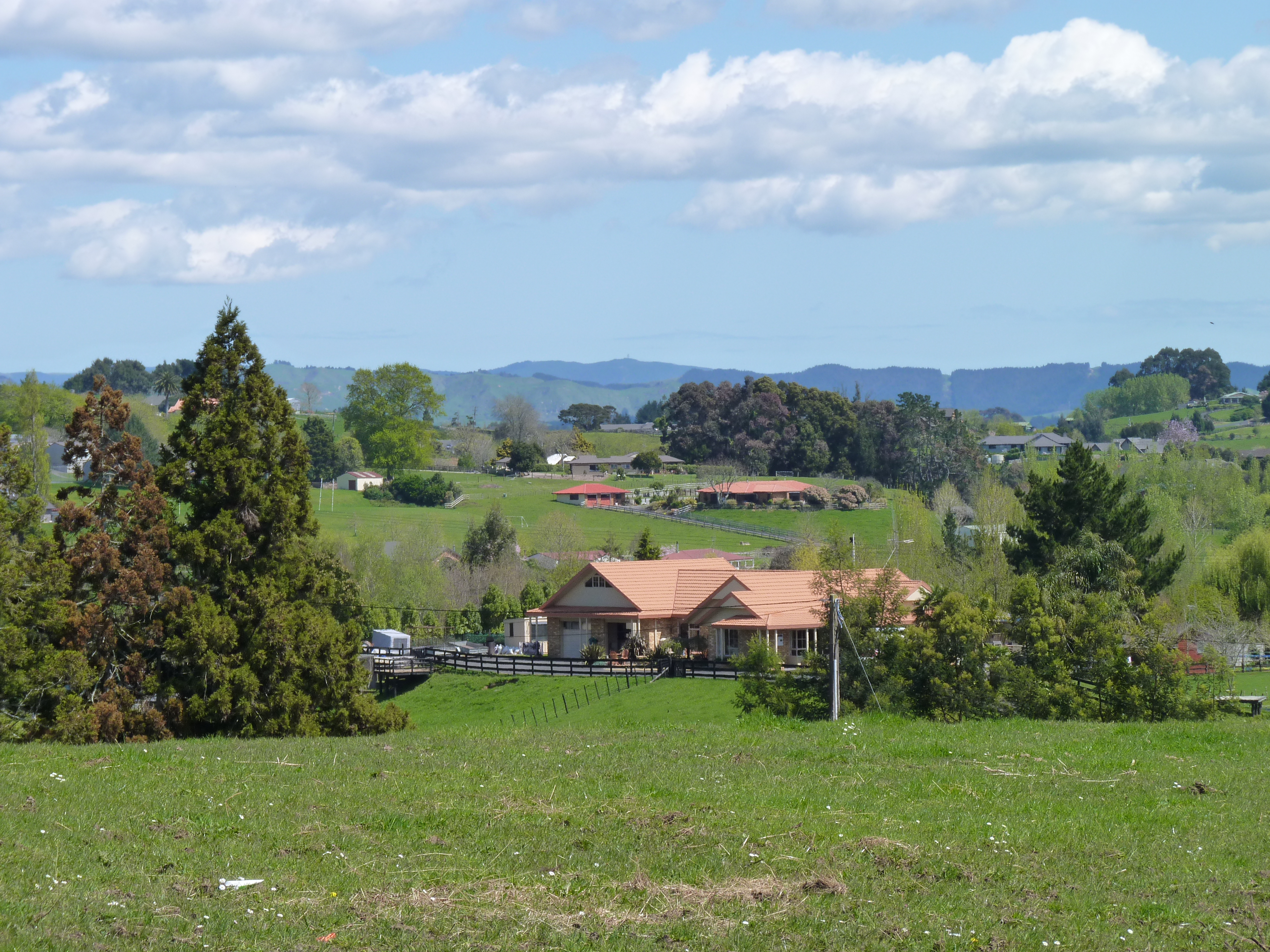
- Rotokauri, west of Hamilton
- Interactive map of Rotokauri
- Coordinates: 37°46′15.31″S 175°12′27.83″E
- Country: New Zealand
- Region: Waikato
- District: Waikato District
- Wards: Newcastle-Ngāruawāhia General Ward; Tai Runga Takiwaa Maaori Ward
- Electorates: Taranaki-King Country; Hauraki-Waikato (Māori)

Government
  - Territorial Authority: Waikato District Council
  - Regional council: Waikato Regional Council
  - Mayor of Waikato: Aksel Bech
  - Taranaki-King Country MP: Barbara Kuriger
  - Hauraki-Waikato MP: Hana-Rawhiti Maipi-Clarke

Area
  - Total: 15.64 km^{2} (6.04 sq mi)

Population (June 2025)
  - Total: 1,070
  - Density: 68.4/km^{2} (177/sq mi)
- Time zone: UTC+12 (NZST)
  - Summer (DST): UTC+13 (NZDT)

Te Kowhai	Horotiu	Burbush
	Rotokauri	Grandview Heights
Whatawhata		Temple View

Rotokauri is a semi-rural locality in Waikato District in New Zealand.

The outskirts of Rotokauri have an orchid farm, all under glass, exporting blooms across the world, and providing ample local employment.

The New Zealand Ministry for Culture and Heritage gives a translation of "kauri tree lake" for Rotokauri.

== Demographics ==
Rotokauri covers 15.64 km^{2} (6.04 sq mi) and had an estimated population of 1,070 as of June 2025, with a population density of 68 people per km^{2}.

Historical population
Year	Pop.	±% p.a.
2006	741	—
2013	912	+3.01%
2018	1,017	+2.20%
2023	1,011	−0.12%

Rotokauri had a population of 1,011 in the 2023 New Zealand census, a decrease of 6 people (−0.6%) since the 2018 census, and an increase of 99 people (10.9%) since the 2013 census. There were 519 males and 492 females in 333 dwellings. 2.1% of people identified as LGBTIQ+. The median age was 44.3 years (compared with 38.1 years nationally). There were 183 people (18.1%) aged under 15 years, 171 (16.9%) aged 15 to 29, 477 (47.2%) aged 30 to 64, and 183 (18.1%) aged 65 or older.

People could identify as more than one ethnicity. The results were 86.4% European (Pākehā); 11.0% Māori; 2.1% Pasifika; 9.5% Asian; 0.3% Middle Eastern, Latin American and African New Zealanders (MELAA); and 3.0% other, which includes people giving their ethnicity as "New Zealander". English was spoken by 97.6%, Māori language by 2.4%, and other languages by 11.3%. No language could be spoken by 1.2% (e.g. too young to talk). New Zealand Sign Language was known by 0.3%. The percentage of people born overseas was 19.9, compared with 28.8% nationally.

Religious affiliations were 32.3% Christian, 1.2% Hindu, 0.6% Islam, 0.3% Māori religious beliefs, 0.3% New Age, and 2.7% other religions. People who answered that they had no religion were 52.8%, and 10.1% of people did not answer the census question.

Of those at least 15 years old, 207 (25.0%) people had a bachelor's or higher degree, 453 (54.7%) had a post-high school certificate or diploma, and 171 (20.7%) people exclusively held high school qualifications. The median income was $50,500, compared with $41,500 nationally. 165 people (19.9%) earned over $100,000 compared to 12.1% nationally. The employment status of those at least 15 was that 444 (53.6%) people were employed full-time, 123 (14.9%) were part-time, and 9 (1.1%) were unemployed.

== Education ==
Rotokauri School is a co-educational state primary school for Year 1 to 8 students with a roll of 237 as of July 2026. The school opened in 1911.
