= Te Wairākau =

Te Wairākau was a Māori woman from the Ngāti Te Ata Waiohua sub-tribe (hapū) of the Te Waiohua tribe (iwi) of New Zealand.

Te Wairākau signed the Treaty of Waitangi in late March or early April 1840, at the Waikato Heads. She was one of only a few Māori women to sign the treaty.
