= Allan Marshall =

Allan Marshall (9 November 1851 – 31 March 1915) was a New Zealand river captain and river engineer. Of Māori descent, he identified with the Ngati Pou and Waikato iwi. He was born in Mercer in the North Island and died at the age of 62.
