= Ngāti Te Ata Waiohua =

Māori iwi (tribe) in Aotearoa (New Zealand)

- Iwi (tribe) in Māoridom
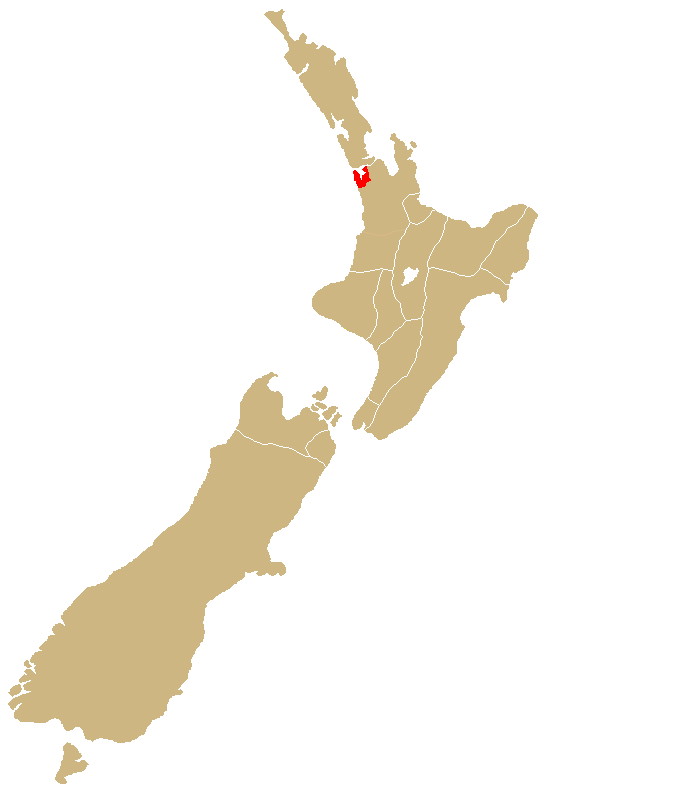
- Waka (canoe): Te Wakatūwhenua, Te Moekākara, Tainui, Te Arawa
- Population: Unknown

Ngāti Te Ata Waiohua is a Māori iwi from the area around the Manukau Harbour in the Auckland Region of New Zealand.

Ngāti Te Ata Waiohua were traditionally known as Te Ruakaiwhare, after their tribal guardian Kaiwhare, who protects the waters of the Manukau Harbour. They occupy the area around Waiuku, Glenbrook, Akaaka, Ōtaua, Te Puni, Whakaūpoko, Mauku, Patumāhoe, Pukekohe, Pukekura (Bombay), Paerātā, Waiau Pā, Clark's Beach, Karaka, Puhitahi (Kingseat), Āwhitu Peninsula, Huia and the Waitākere Ranges.

The iwi gets its name from the famous Waiohua chieftainess Te Ata-i-Rehia, a granddaughter of the founding Te Wai-o-Hua chief, Huakaiwaka and daughter of Huatau. She was born on Matukutūreia (McLaughlin's Mountain) in the Manukau area and her whenua (placenta) was buried on its peak. Te Ata-i-Rehia married Tapaue, a Ngāti Mahuta chief, who was killed after winning control of a stretch of the Waikato River from Taupiri to Port Waikato. His death was avenged by his son Pāpaka, who secured Waiuku for Ngāti Te Ata Waiohua with the help of Te Wehi from Aotea Harbour, the grand-nephew and son-in-law to Tapaue.

Te Wairākau was a woman of Ngāti Te Ata Waiohua who signed the Treaty of Waitangi in 1840. Along with her kin and chiefs of Ngāti Te Ata Waiohua, Aperahama Ngākāinga, Te Awarahi Te Katipa and Te Tāwha, they signed the Treaty of Waitangi on the Manukau Harbour.

Ngāti Te Ata Waiohua consists of 20 hapū and the iwi descends from the union of Huakaiwaka and Te Rauwhakiwhaki, founding ancestors of Te Waiohua.

Huakaiwaka and Te Rauwhakiwhaki birthed the Waiohua chieftainess, Huatau, who controlled the lands in and around Ngā Matukurua, Matukutūreia (McLaughlin's Mountain) and Matukutūruru (Wiri Mountain) during the 18th Century. Many significant sites across Tāmaki Makaurau (modern-day Auckland) were named after Huatau, including St Mary's Bay and Shelley Beach situated near Point Erin, Te Ōka. This original foreshore area was known as 'Te Onemaru o Huatau', 'The Sheltered Beach of Huatau'.

Huatau joined Kawahi of Ngā Iwi and Te Atairehia was born near the peak of Matukutūreia. Huarangi, the brother of Te Atairehia, commanded both Ngā Matukurua pā respectively, with his sons Tamapāhure and Tamapāhore. These people were known as Ngāti Huatau, the issues of Huatau.

The principal Ngāti Te Ata Waiohua marae is Tāhuna Kaitoto Pā marae, situated near Te Pae o Kaiwaka Waiuku Estuary, which is the oldest living marae in Auckland.

== See also ==
- List of Māori iwi
