= Port Waikato =

Settlement in Waikato, New Zealand

- Town
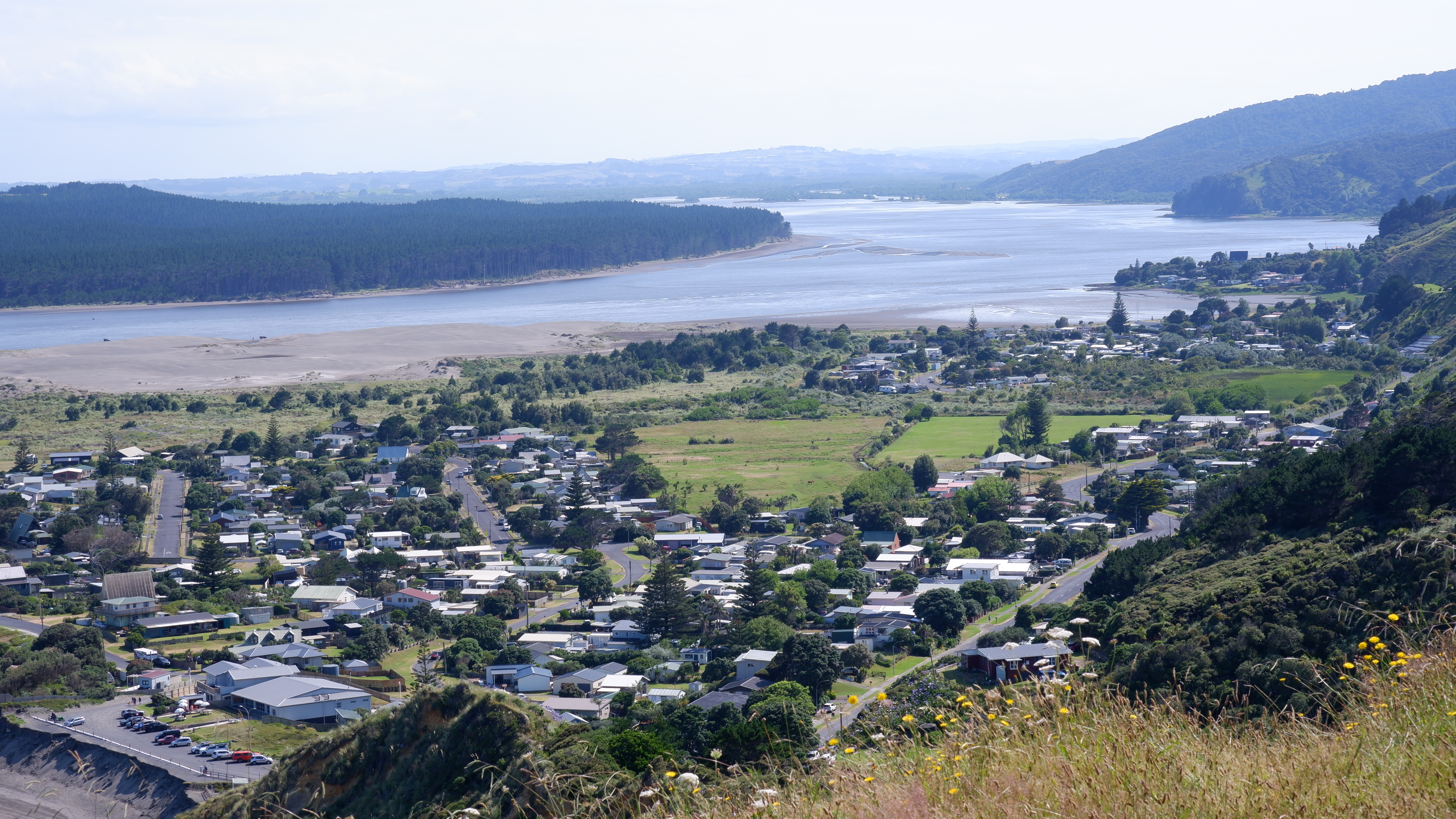
- A view overlooking the Port Waikato township
- Nickname: The Port
- Interactive map of Port Waikato
- Coordinates: 37.390°S 174.729°E
- Country: New Zealand
- Region: Waikato
- District: Waikato District
- Wards: Western Districts General Ward; Tai Raro Takiwaa Maaori Ward
- Community: Rural-Port Waikato Community
- Electorates: Port Waikato; Hauraki-Waikato (Māori)

Government
  - Territorial Authority: Waikato District Council
  - Regional council: Waikato Regional Council
  - Mayor of Waikato: Aksel Bech
  - Port Waikato MP: Matthew Paul
  - Hauraki-Waikato MP: Hana-Rawhiti Maipi-Clarke

Area
  - Total: 3.78 km^{2} (1.46 sq mi)

Population (June 2025)
  - Total: 590
  - Density: 160/km^{2} (400/sq mi)

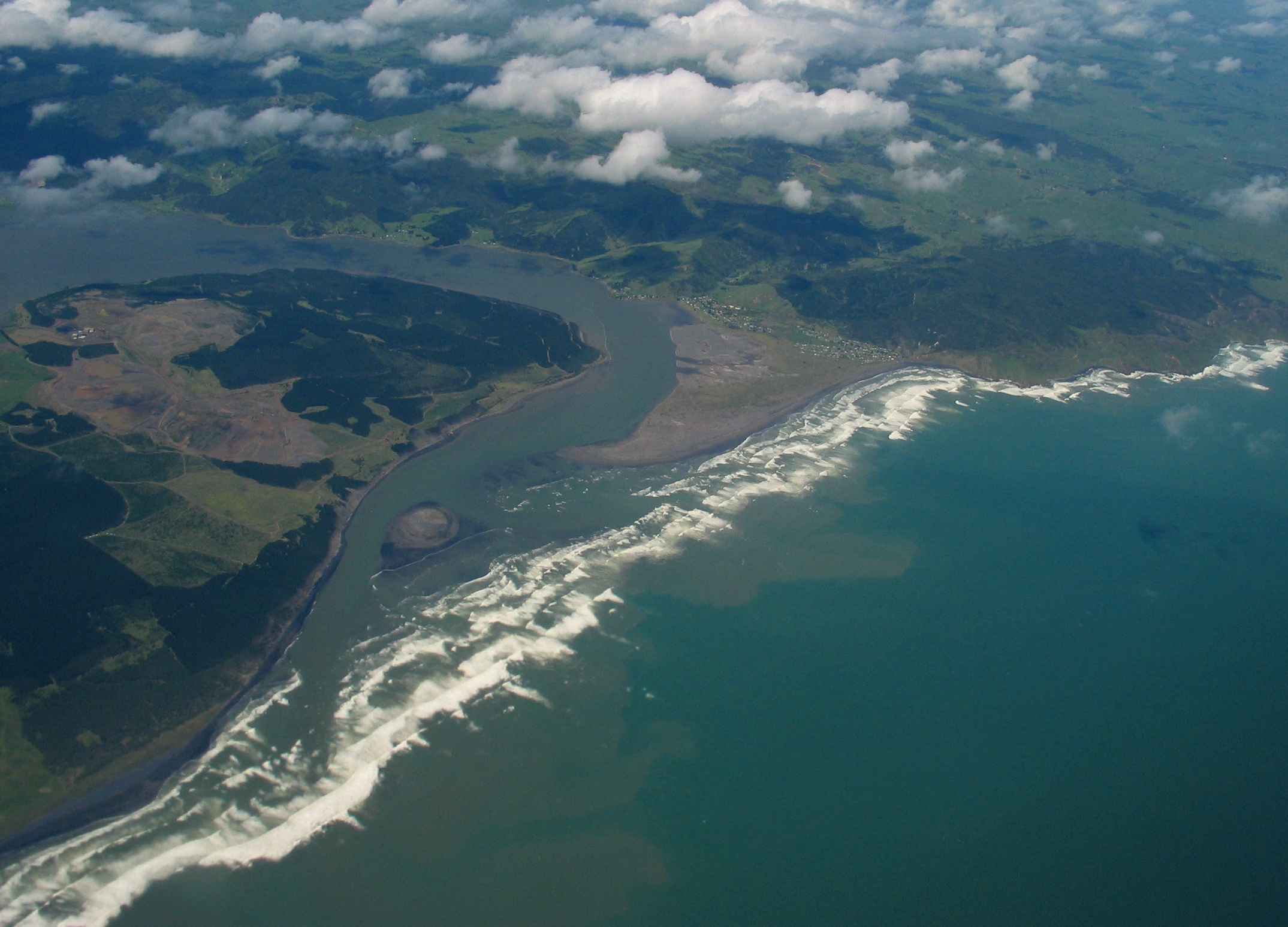
Aerial view of Port Waikato

Port Waikato is a New Zealand town that sits on the south bank of the Waikato River, at its outflow into the Tasman Sea, in the northern Waikato.

Port Waikato is a well-known surfing and whitebaiting destination and a popular holiday spot. Fish can be caught off the rocks and surf beach, and off the sand dunes that border the river mouth. Flounder and mullet are also plentiful using drag nets. Port Waikato is a location where sedimentary rock formations of 65–85 million years' antiquity are found, and a Jurassic-period dinosaur fossil was found there. Weathertop footage from the Lord of the Rings was filmed in limestone outcrops just south of the town.

The Port has a Wharf Store, established 1893, a take-away shop, café, campground, library, community hall, fire station, surf lifesaving club, yachting club and an active fishing club. A school camp was established near the town in the 1920s, which boasts a well-formed BMX track. Port Waikato also serves as a popular wedding destination.

== History ==
Port Waikato was an important port during the New Zealand Wars of the 19th century. It was the first of the colonial settlements to be constructed after the wars, being started in 1863. It had until then been called Putataka, but soon the present name was in general use. The Māori name remains for the 354 m (1,161 ft) hill above the town.

For many years Port Waikato was the transhipment point between ships of the Northern Steamship Co and the river steamers of the Waikato Shipping Co, run by Caesar Roose. The frequency increased to twice a week in 1924. At the same time a Cambridge to Port Waikato excursion was being run two or three times a year, taking 12 to 14 hours downstream and a few hours longer upstream. Until 16 April 2026 a morning and afternoon bus from Pukekohe ran on Thursdays, but had too few passengers to be continued.

== Coastal erosion ==
Sunset Beach at Port Waikato has been subject to significant coastal erosion. In 2018, it was claimed that 30 m (98 ft) of land had been lost from the coast in the previous few years. In July 2024, a carpark above the beach was closed after 2 m (6 ft 7 in) of cliff edge was lost to erosion overnight. The local council plans for managed retreat and has replaced a community hall with a new community hub further inland.

== Demographics ==
Statistics New Zealand describes Port Waikato as a rural settlement, which covers 3.78 km^{2} (1.46 sq mi) and had an estimated population of 590 as of June 2025, with a population density of 156 people per km^{2}. Port Waikato is part of the larger Port Waikato-Waikaretu statistical area.

Historical population for Port Waikato settlement
| Year | Pop. | ±% p.a. |
|---|---|---|
| 2006 | 486 | — |
| 2013 | 471 | −0.45% |
| 2018 | 528 | +2.31% |
| 2023 | 567 | +1.44% |

Port Waikato had a population of 567 in the 2023 New Zealand census, an increase of 39 people (7.4%) since the 2018 census, and an increase of 96 people (20.4%) since the 2013 census. There were 291 males and 273 females in 219 dwellings. 4.2% of people identified as LGBTIQ+. The median age was 51.9 years (compared with 38.1 years nationally). There were 78 people (13.8%) aged under 15 years, 78 (13.8%) aged 15 to 29, 288 (50.8%) aged 30 to 64, and 126 (22.2%) aged 65 or older.

People could identify as more than one ethnicity. The results were 68.8% European (Pākehā); 38.1% Māori; 9.0% Pasifika; 2.1% Asian; 0.5% Middle Eastern, Latin American and African New Zealanders (MELAA); and 3.2% other, which includes people giving their ethnicity as "New Zealander". English was spoken by 98.4%, Māori language by 9.0%, Samoan by 2.1%, and other languages by 4.8%. No language could be spoken by 1.6% (e.g. too young to talk). New Zealand Sign Language was known by 1.1%. The percentage of people born overseas was 11.1, compared with 28.8% nationally.

Religious affiliations were 27.0% Christian, 0.5% Hindu, 2.1% Māori religious beliefs, 0.5% Buddhist, 1.1% New Age, and 0.5% other religions. People who answered that they had no religion were 59.3%, and 9.5% of people did not answer the census question.

Of those at least 15 years old, 81 (16.6%) people had a bachelor's or higher degree, 270 (55.2%) had a post-high school certificate or diploma, and 144 (29.4%) people exclusively held high school qualifications. The median income was $34,800, compared with $41,500 nationally. 39 people (8.0%) earned over $100,000 compared to 12.1% nationally. The employment status of those at least 15 was that 198 (40.5%) people were employed full-time, 75 (15.3%) were part-time, and 15 (3.1%) were unemployed.

=== Port Waikato-Waikaretu statistical area ===
Port Waikato-Waikaretu statistical area, which also includes Waikaretu, covers 210.14 km^{2} (81.14 sq mi) and had an estimated population of 830 as of June 2025, with a population density of 3.9 people per km^{2}.

Historical population for the statistical area
| Year | Pop. | ±% p.a. |
|---|---|---|
| 2006 | 729 | — |
| 2013 | 732 | +0.06% |
| 2018 | 783 | +1.36% |
| 2023 | 807 | +0.61% |

Port Waikato-Waikaretu had a population of 807 in the 2023 New Zealand census, an increase of 24 people (3.1%) since the 2018 census, and an increase of 75 people (10.2%) since the 2013 census. There were 414 males, 393 females and 3 people of other genders in 318 dwellings. 3.7% of people identified as LGBTIQ+. The median age was 48.3 years (compared with 38.1 years nationally). There were 126 people (15.6%) aged under 15 years, 123 (15.2%) aged 15 to 29, 396 (49.1%) aged 30 to 64, and 165 (20.4%) aged 65 or older.

People could identify as more than one ethnicity. The results were 68.0% European (Pākehā); 41.6% Māori; 7.4% Pasifika; 1.9% Asian; 0.4% Middle Eastern, Latin American and African New Zealanders (MELAA); and 3.0% other, which includes people giving their ethnicity as "New Zealander". English was spoken by 98.1%, Māori language by 11.9%, Samoan by 1.5%, and other languages by 4.1%. No language could be spoken by 1.9% (e.g. too young to talk). New Zealand Sign Language was known by 0.4%. The percentage of people born overseas was 9.7, compared with 28.8% nationally.

Religious affiliations were 26.8% Christian, 0.4% Hindu, 2.6% Māori religious beliefs, 0.4% Buddhist, 1.5% New Age, and 0.7% other religions. People who answered that they had no religion were 59.9%, and 8.6% of people did not answer the census question.

Of those at least 15 years old, 108 (15.9%) people had a bachelor's or higher degree, 366 (53.7%) had a post-high school certificate or diploma, and 210 (30.8%) people exclusively held high school qualifications. The median income was $34,200, compared with $41,500 nationally. 51 people (7.5%) earned over $100,000 compared to 12.1% nationally. The employment status of those at least 15 was that 285 (41.9%) people were employed full-time, 108 (15.9%) were part-time, and 30 (4.4%) were unemployed.

== Marae ==
The local Ōraeroa Marae and its Whareroa meeting house is meeting place for the Waikato Tainui hapū of Ngāti Tāhinga and Ngāti Tiipa.

== Education ==
Te Kura Kaupapa Māori o Te Puaha o Waikato is a co-educational state Māori immersion primary school, with a roll of 51 as of July 2026.

== Climate ==
Climate data for Port Waikato (Waiuku Forest) (5km N of Port Waikato, 1981–2010 normals, extremes 1939–1995)
| Month | Jan | Feb | Mar | Apr | May | Jun | Jul | Aug | Sep | Oct | Nov | Dec | Year |
|---|---|---|---|---|---|---|---|---|---|---|---|---|---|
| Record high °C (°F) | 33.0 (91.4) | 29.5 (85.1) | 30.0 (86.0) | 27.0 (80.6) | 24.7 (76.5) | 20.6 (69.1) | 20.1 (68.2) | 21.1 (70.0) | 21.9 (71.4) | 25.1 (77.2) | 26.0 (78.8) | 27.7 (81.9) | 33.0 (91.4) |
| Mean daily maximum °C (°F) | 22.9 (73.2) | 23.5 (74.3) | 22.3 (72.1) | 20.0 (68.0) | 17.7 (63.9) | 15.1 (59.2) | 14.4 (57.9) | 14.9 (58.8) | 16.4 (61.5) | 17.3 (63.1) | 19.1 (66.4) | 21.2 (70.2) | 18.7 (65.7) |
| Daily mean °C (°F) | 18.7 (65.7) | 19.2 (66.6) | 17.9 (64.2) | 15.5 (59.9) | 13.5 (56.3) | 10.9 (51.6) | 10.0 (50.0) | 10.9 (51.6) | 12.4 (54.3) | 13.6 (56.5) | 15.2 (59.4) | 17.3 (63.1) | 14.6 (58.3) |
| Mean daily minimum °C (°F) | 14.5 (58.1) | 14.9 (58.8) | 13.5 (56.3) | 11.0 (51.8) | 9.3 (48.7) | 6.7 (44.1) | 5.7 (42.3) | 7.0 (44.6) | 8.5 (47.3) | 10.0 (50.0) | 11.4 (52.5) | 13.4 (56.1) | 10.5 (50.9) |
| Record low °C (°F) | 4.9 (40.8) | 5.8 (42.4) | 2.1 (35.8) | −0.3 (31.5) | −1.1 (30.0) | −2.4 (27.7) | −3.8 (25.2) | −2.7 (27.1) | −0.3 (31.5) | 0.4 (32.7) | 1.2 (34.2) | 3.4 (38.1) | −3.8 (25.2) |
| Average rainfall mm (inches) | 73.6 (2.90) | 89.9 (3.54) | 86.2 (3.39) | 83.2 (3.28) | 90.9 (3.58) | 156.2 (6.15) | 156.8 (6.17) | 163.4 (6.43) | 144.6 (5.69) | 112.8 (4.44) | 94.4 (3.72) | 64.9 (2.56) | 1,316.9 (51.85) |
Source: NIWA (rainfall 1991–2020)

== See also ==
- Port Waikato electorate
- 1891 Port Waikato earthquake
