= Waikato District Council =

Territorial authority of New Zealand

Coordinates: 37.6680745°S 175.1487314°E

Waikato District Council Te Kaunihera aa Takiwaa o Waikato
- Brand logo

Type
- Type: Territorial authority of Waikato District
- Term limits: None

History
- Established: 1 November 1989; 36 years ago
- Preceded by: Waikato County Council; Raglan County Council; Waipa County Council; Huntly Borough Council; Ngaruawahia Borough Coucil
- New session started: 19 October 2025

Leadership
- Mayor: Aksel Bech, Ind. since 19 October 2025
- Mayor: Eugene Patterson, Ind. since 30 October 2025
- CEO: Craig Hobbs since 3 February 2025

Structure
- Seats: 14 (including mayor)
- Political groups: Independent (14)

Elections
- Voting system: First-past-the-post
- First election: 14 October 1989
- Last election: 11 October 2025
- Next election: 14 October 2028

Meeting place
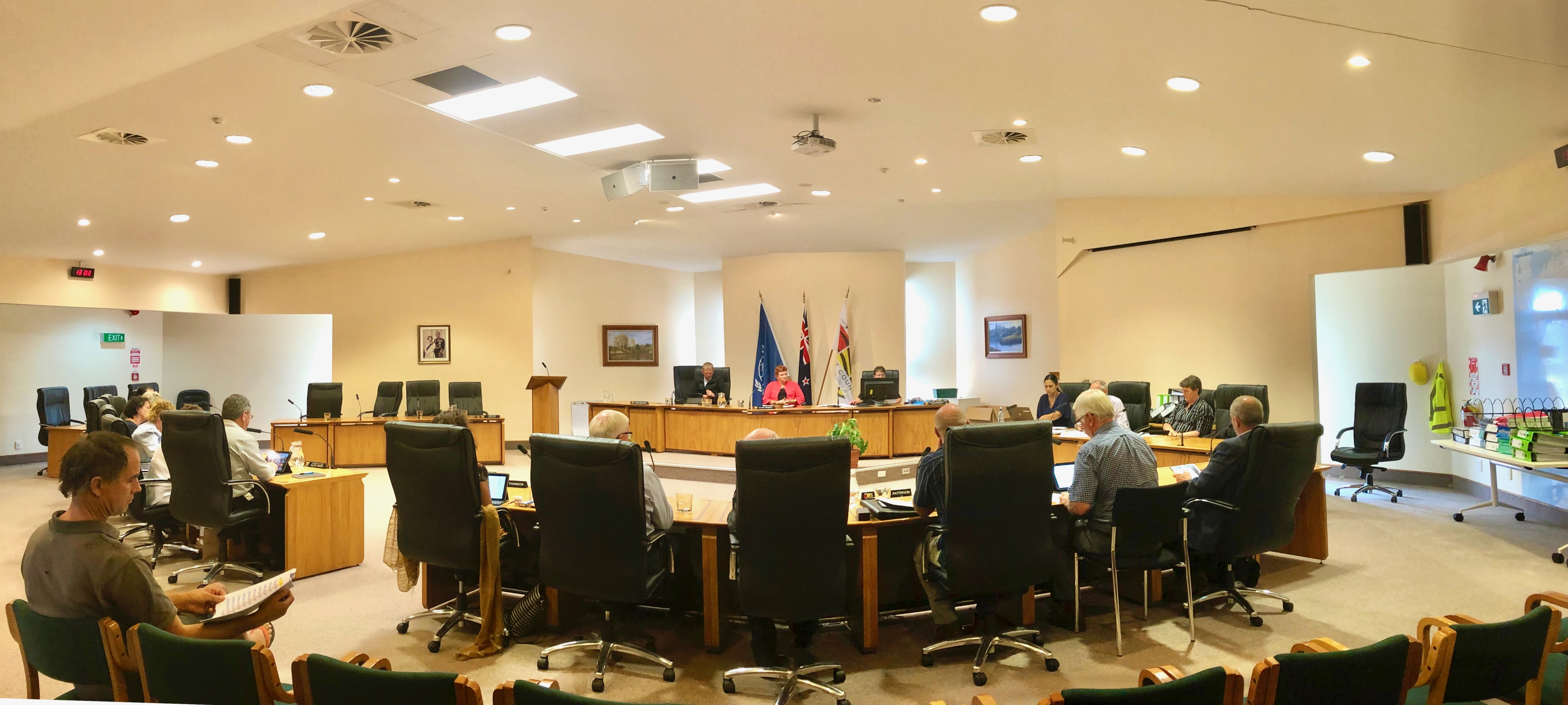
- 15 Galileo Street, Ngāruawāhia

Website
- waikatodistrict.govt.nz

Waikato District Council (abbr. WDC; Māori: Te Kaunihera aa Takiwaa o Waikato) is the territorial authority for the Waikato District of New Zealand. It serves as the district's local government alongside the Waikato Regional Council as the regional council. The current entity has existed since 1989, prior to which local government in the area was split between five local authorities.

The governing body of the council has 13 councillors and is chaired by the mayor of Waikato (currently Aksel Bech since October 2025). There are also six community boards

== History ==
The council was established in 1989, replacing Raglan County Council (established in 1876), Waikato County Council (established in 1876), Ngāruawāhia Borough Council (established in 1920), and Huntly Borough Council (established in 1931).

== Governing body ==
=== Mayor ===
One mayor is elected at-large; they chair meetings of the governing body and act as the head of local government in the district.

Mayor Aksel Bech was first elected as mayor in 2025, and prior to that was first elected to the council in 2016, but failed to be elected as mayor in 2022.

=== Current composition ===
The current members of the governing body of council are:

Role	Portrait	Name	Affiliation	Ward
Mayor		Aksel Bech	Independent	Elected at-large
Deputy mayor		Eugene Patterson	Independent	Newcastle-Ngāruawāhia
Councillor		Tilly Turner	Independent	Tai Runga Takiwaa
Councillor		Endine Dixon-Harris	Independent	Tai Raro Takiwaa
Councillor		Peter Thomson	Independent	Awaroa-Maramarua
Councillor		David Whyte	Independent	Huntly
Councillor		Grant Coombes	Independent	Newcastle-Ngāruawāhia
Councillor		Crystal Beavis	Independent	Tamahere-Woodlands
Councillor		Mike Keir	Independent	Tamahere-Woodlands
Councillor		Fabio Rodrigues	Independent	Tuakau-Pōkeno
Councillor		Vernon Reeve	Independent	Tuakau-Pōkeno
Councillor		Marlene Raumati	Independent	Waerenga-Whitikahu
Councillor		Carolyn Eyre	Independent	Western Districts
Councillor		Lisa Thomson	Independent	Whāingaroa

== Community boards ==
The Waikato District Council currently has six community boards:

- Huntly Community Board
- Ngāruawāhia Community Board
- Raglan Community Board
- Rural-Port Waikato Community Board
- Taupiri Community Board
- Tuakau Community Board

== Elections ==
=== List ===
==== Mayoral ====
- 1989
- 1992
- 1995
- 1998
- 2001
- 2004
- 2007
- 2010
- 2013
- 2016
- 2019
- 2022
- 2025

==== Council ====
- 1989
- 1992
- 1995
- 1998
- 2001
- 2004
- 2007
- 2010
- 2013
- 2016
- 2019
- 2022
- 2025
