= Matthew Paul =

New Zealand politician

Member of the New Zealand Parliament for Port Waikato
- Incumbent
- Assumed office 7 November 2026
- Preceded by: Andrew Bayly

Personal details
- Born: 1984 or 1985 (age 40–41)
- Party: National Party

Matthew Paul (born 1984 or 1985) is a New Zealand politician. He was elected to the New Zealand House of Representatives at the 2026 New Zealand general election as a National Party MP for the electorate of Port Waikato.

== Early life ==
His father was a former commercial tomato grower.

== Career ==
Paul is a arboriculturist by profession. He has worked as an environmental consultant. He is the chair of the Valley School board in Pukekohe.

== Political career ==
New Zealand Parliament
Years	Term	Electorate	List	Party
2026–present	55th	Port Waikato	62nd	National

Paul is the National Party candidate for Port Waikato. He was selected to replace Andrew Bayly. On 7 November, Paul retained Port Waikato for National by a margin of 10,437.
