= Waikato District =

- Territorial authority district
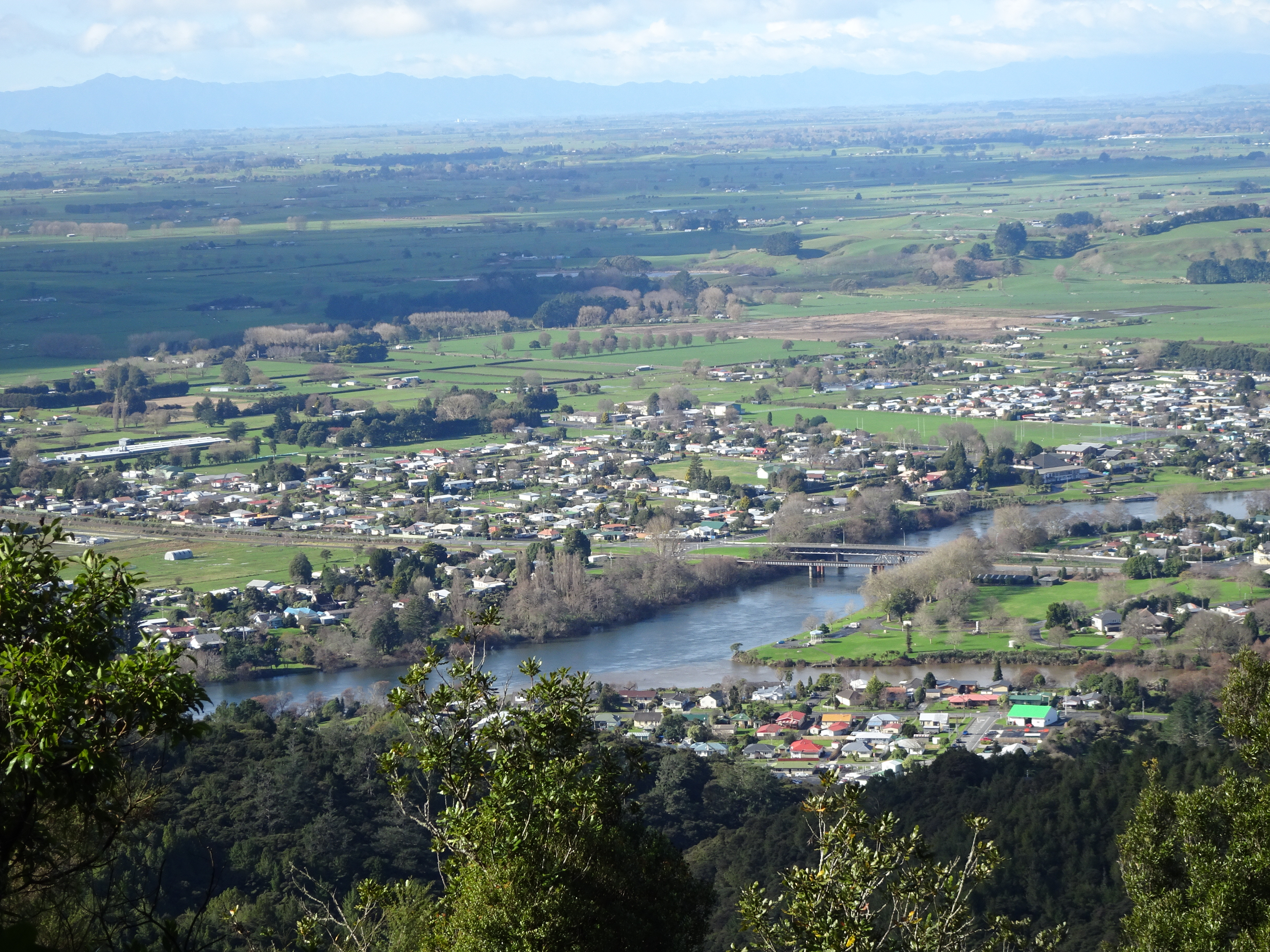

- Waikato district within the North Island
- Coordinates: 37°36′S 175°12′E
- Country: New Zealand
- Region: Waikato
- Wards: Tuakau-Pōkeno, Western Districts, Awaroa-Maramarua, Waerenga-Whitikahu, Tamahere-Woodlands, Huntly, Newcastle-Ngāruawāhia, Whāingaroa, Tai Raro Takiwaa (Māori)
- Seat: Ngāruawāhia

Government
  - Mayor: Aksel Bech
  - Territorial authority: Waikato District Council

Area
  - Land: 4,404.07 km^{2} (1,700.42 sq mi)

Population (June 2025)
  - Total: 91,100
  - Density: 20.7/km^{2} (53.6/sq mi)
- Time zone: UTC+12 (NZST)
  - Summer (DST): UTC+13 (NZDT)
- Postcode(s): Map of postcodes
- Website: Waikato District Council

Waikato District is a territorial authority of New Zealand, in the northern part of Waikato region, North Island. Waikato District is administered by the Waikato District Council, with headquarters in Ngāruawāhia.

The district is centred to the north and west of the city of Hamilton, and takes in much of the northern Waikato Plains and also the Hakarimata Range. The north of the district contains swampy floodplain of the Waikato River and several small lakes, of which the largest is Lake Waikare.

Other than Ngāruawāhia, the main population centres are Huntly, Raglan, and Te Kauwhata. The main industries in the district are dairy farming, forestry, and coal mining. There is a major coal-fired power station at Huntly. Te Kauwhata is at the centre of a major wine region.

== Demographics ==
At the 2006 census, the district had a population of 43,959. Of these, 6834 lived in Huntly, 5106 in Ngāruawāhia, 2637 in Raglan, and 1294 in Te Kauwhata. In 2010, the district acquired part of the adjacent Franklin District, which was dissolved as part of the creation of the Auckland Council, increasing the area to 4,405 km^{2} (1,701 sq mi). and adding the growing settlements of Tuakau and Pōkeno.

Waikato District covers 4,404.07 km^{2} (1,700.42 sq mi) and had an estimated population of 91,100 as of June 2025, with a population density of 20.7 people per km^{2}.

Historical population
Year	Pop.	±% p.a.
2006	57,588	—
2013	63,378	+1.38%
2018	75,618	+3.59%
2023	85,968	+2.60%

Waikato District had a population of 85,968 in the 2023 New Zealand census, an increase of 10,350 people (13.7%) since the 2018 census, and an increase of 22,590 people (35.6%) since the 2013 census. There were 43,305 males, 42,426 females and 234 people of other genders in 28,401 dwellings. 2.4% of people identified as LGBTIQ+. The median age was 38.0 years (compared with 38.1 years nationally). There were 18,675 people (21.7%) aged under 15 years, 14,931 (17.4%) aged 15 to 29, 40,224 (46.8%) aged 30 to 64, and 12,138 (14.1%) aged 65 or older.

People could identify as more than one ethnicity. The results were 73.6% European (Pākehā); 26.9% Māori; 5.5% Pasifika; 9.1% Asian; 1.1% Middle Eastern, Latin American and African New Zealanders (MELAA); and 2.6% other, which includes people giving their ethnicity as "New Zealander". English was spoken by 96.2%, Māori language by 7.5%, Samoan by 0.5% and other languages by 10.5%. No language could be spoken by 2.2% (e.g. too young to talk). New Zealand Sign Language was known by 0.5%. The percentage of people born overseas was 18.9, compared with 28.8% nationally.

Religious affiliations were 29.3% Christian, 1.8% Hindu, 0.6% Islam, 1.7% Māori religious beliefs, 0.5% Buddhist, 0.4% New Age, 0.1% Jewish, and 2.2% other religions. People who answered that they had no religion were 56.3%, and 7.4% of people did not answer the census question.

Of those at least 15 years old, 10,914 (16.2%) people had a bachelor's or higher degree, 36,840 (54.7%) had a post-high school certificate or diploma, and 16,293 (24.2%) people exclusively held high school qualifications. The median income was $45,300, compared with $41,500 nationally. 9,165 people (13.6%) earned over $100,000 compared to 12.1% nationally. The employment status of those at least 15 was that 36,426 (54.1%) people were employed full-time, 9,432 (14.0%) were part-time, and 1,827 (2.7%) were unemployed.

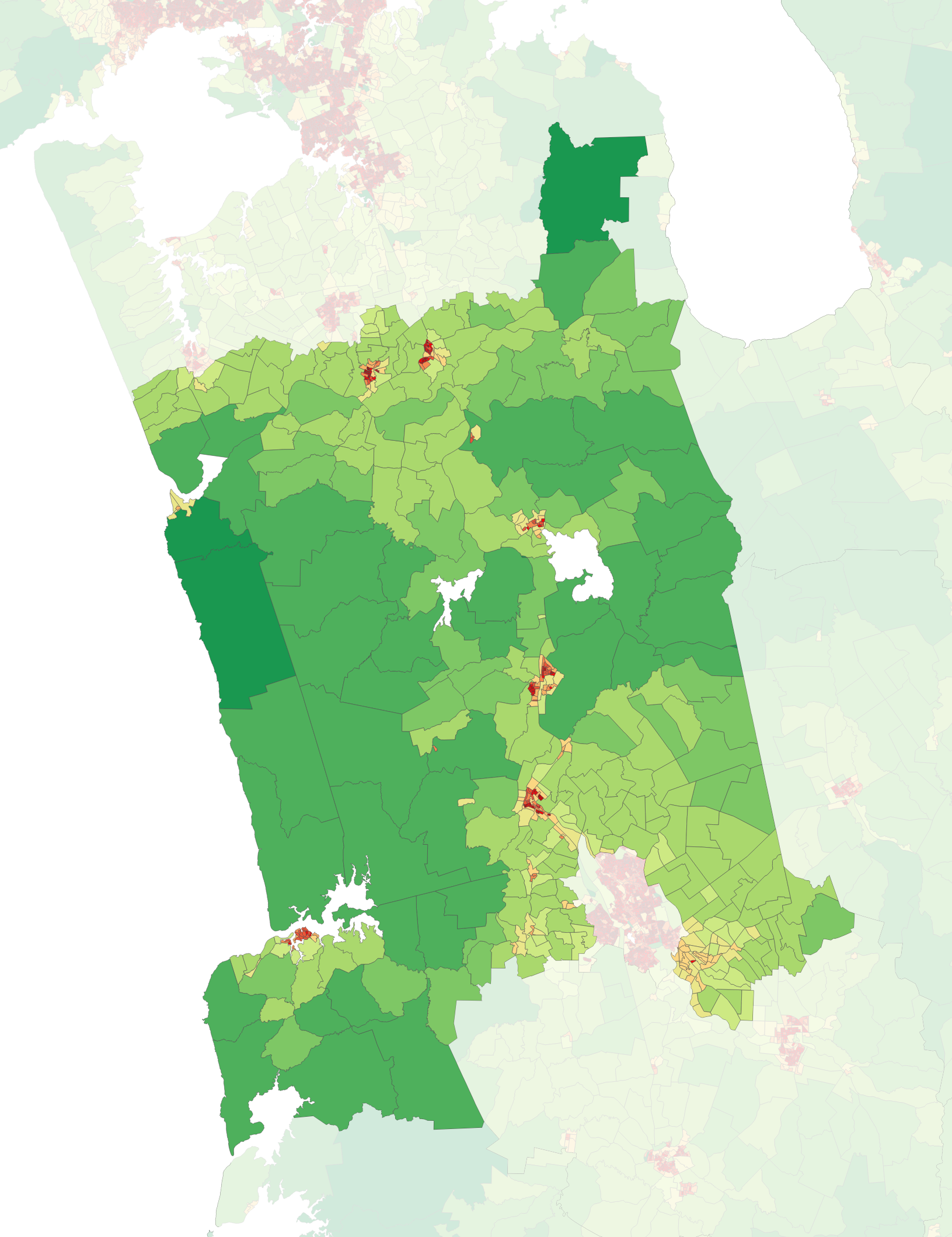
Population density in the 2023 census

Individual wards
Name	Area (km^{2})	Population	Density (per km^{2})	Dwellings	Median age	Median income
Tuakau-Pōkeno General Ward	197.37	15,960	80.9	5,073	35.4 years	$51,400
Western Districts General Ward	1,451.33	6,060	4.2	2,211	42.3 years	$40,200
Awaroa-Maramarua General Ward	743.82	6,363	8.6	2,169	40.4 years	$45,900
Waerenga-Whitikahu General Ward	655.70	8,484	12.9	2,775	37.7 years	$43,800
Tamahere-Woodlands General Ward	356.98	14,352	40.2	4,680	42.6 years	$50,000
Huntly General Ward	187.06	9,339	49.9	3,060	35.3 years	$35,200
Newcastle-Ngāruawāhia General Ward	221.58	18,564	83.8	5,913	35.8 years	$48,200
Whāingaroa General Ward	590.23	6,840	11.6	2,520	41.1 years	$37,500
New Zealand					38.1 years	$41,500

== History ==
Under the Local Government (Waikato Region) Reorganisation Order 1989, nearly all of Waikato County Council was added to the Boroughs of Huntly, Ngāruawāhia, most of Raglan County Council and a small part of Waipa County Council to form Waikato District Council.

The County Councils had lasted over a hundred years from their formation in 1876. They had been preceded by Highways Boards, formed from 1866. Before that, there had been many complaints about Auckland Province spending a disproportionate amount in Auckland. For example, in 1867 27 Raglan settlers petitioned the House of Representatives asking it to replace provinces with local government and saying that, out of a £500,000 loan to the province, only £500 was spent in all the country districts.

=== Highways Boards ===
Auckland Province passed a Highways Act in 1862 allowing their Superintendent to define given areas of settlement as Highways Districts, each with a board of trustees elected by the landowners. Land within the boundaries of highway districts became subject to a rate of not more than 1/- an acre, or of 3d in the £ of its estimated sale value, and that was to be equalled by a grant from the Province.

By a notice in the Provincial Government Gazette on 25 August 1866, the deputy Superintendent, Daniel Pollen, declared Whaingaroa Highway District, the first in the future Raglan County. A public meeting in the Raglan courthouse on 20 October 1866 was followed by a meeting a week later to elect 5 trustees. The largest landowner in the district, Captain Johnstone, was elected chairman, but he and 3 other trustees resigned after they couldn't collect rates from absent owners and the Province didn't pay anything.

Raglan Town Board was formed in 1868, Karioi Board in 1870 by division of Whaingaroa Highway District and by 1871 eleven board chairmen met in Ohaupo to ask for more government help. From 1872 government assistance more than matched rates collected; today government funding through NZTA mainly matches rates funding.

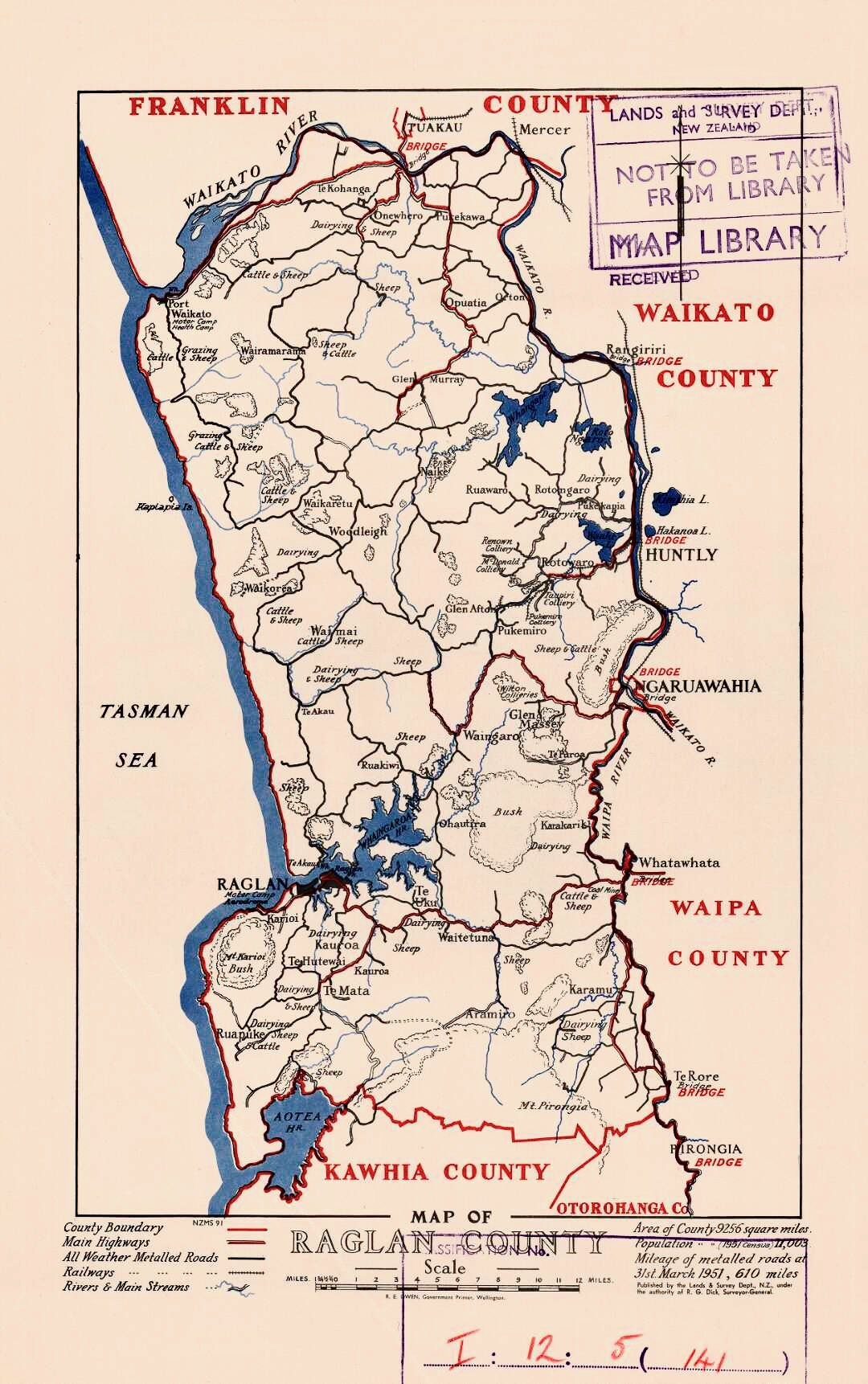
1951 Raglan County Council map

=== Raglan County Council ===
Under the Counties Act, 1876, in a NZ Gazette Supplement of Thursday, December 28, 1876, the Governor General set the first county council meetings at noon, Raglan County's being in The Resident Magistrate's Court, Raglan on Tuesday, 9 January 1877.

Raglan County was divided into five ridings (based on the distance a horse could travel in a day): Karioi, Pirongia, with 2 councillors each, and Te Akau, Onewhero and Whangape, with one. Only 3 of the Ridings were represented at the first meeting; W. H. Wallis (elected chairman) and John Pegler, Karioi Riding; James Sherrett, Pirongia; and Richard Robert Hunt, Onewhero. At the next meeting in Whatawhata there was only one other councillor present, from Pirongia. Many of the areas had not had Highway Boards and were sparsely populated (874 people in 175 houses across the whole county), so voters had problems getting together to nominate councillors. By 1887 there were 8 nominations for the 7 seats.

As the population grew, the original 5 ridings were split - Karamu from Pirongia (28 November 1889), Whaingaroa from Karioi 1902, Pukekawa from Onewhero and Port Waikato from Te Akau 1911, Pukemiro from Whangape 1913 and Waingaro from Te Akau 1920.

In 1923, Raglan County covered 934 mi^{2} (2,420 km^{2}) and had a population of 4,912, with 162 mi (261 km) of gravel roads, 465 mi (748 km) of mud roads and 234 mi (377 km) of tracks.

Some areas were transferred to neighbouring councils. The far south of Raglan went to Kawhia County when it was formed, but in 1952, the Local Government Commission put Makomako back in Raglan. On 1 October 1944, a coal-bearing area of Huntly West went to Huntly Borough. Other minor alterations were gazetted at intervals over the years. In 1954, a Raglan Town Committee was formed. Under the Local Government Act 1974, Raglan and Rotowaro became community towns, governed by elected councils.

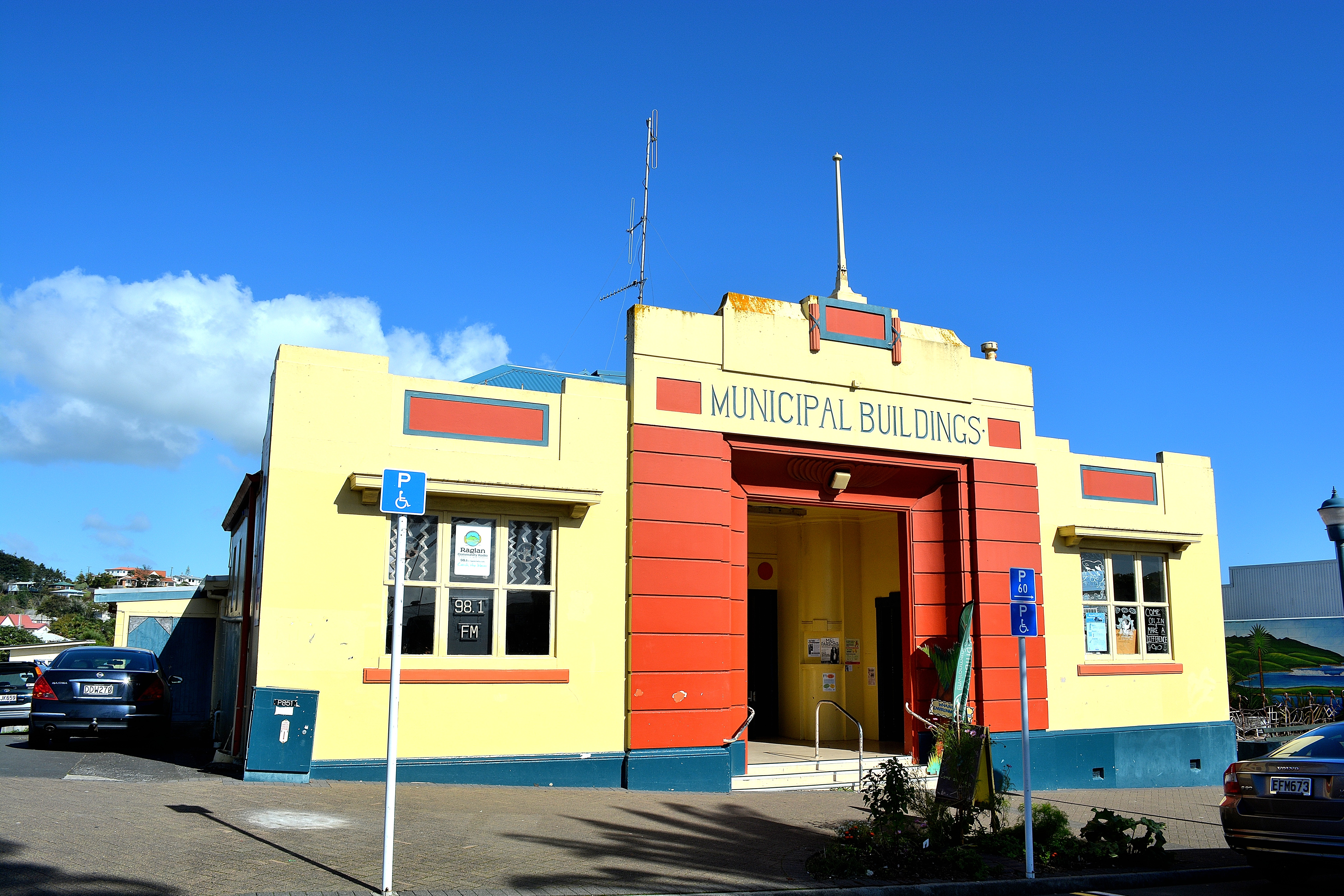
Raglan Municipal Buildings

The county relied on government grants until 1887, when government cuts forced it to set a rate. From 1889 to 1902 the Highways Boards were gradually merged into the County. Until 1943, each riding paid for its own roads and bridges, supplemented by council funds.

The northern portion of Raglan County was added to Franklin District in 1989 when the rest joined WDC.

==== Offices ====
Raglan had also had a Town Board from 1883 to 1889 and from 1906 to 1938. Raglan Town Board had its offices in the Municipal Buildings in Raglan from their rebuilding in 1928, after a 1927 fire, until the Board again merged with the County.

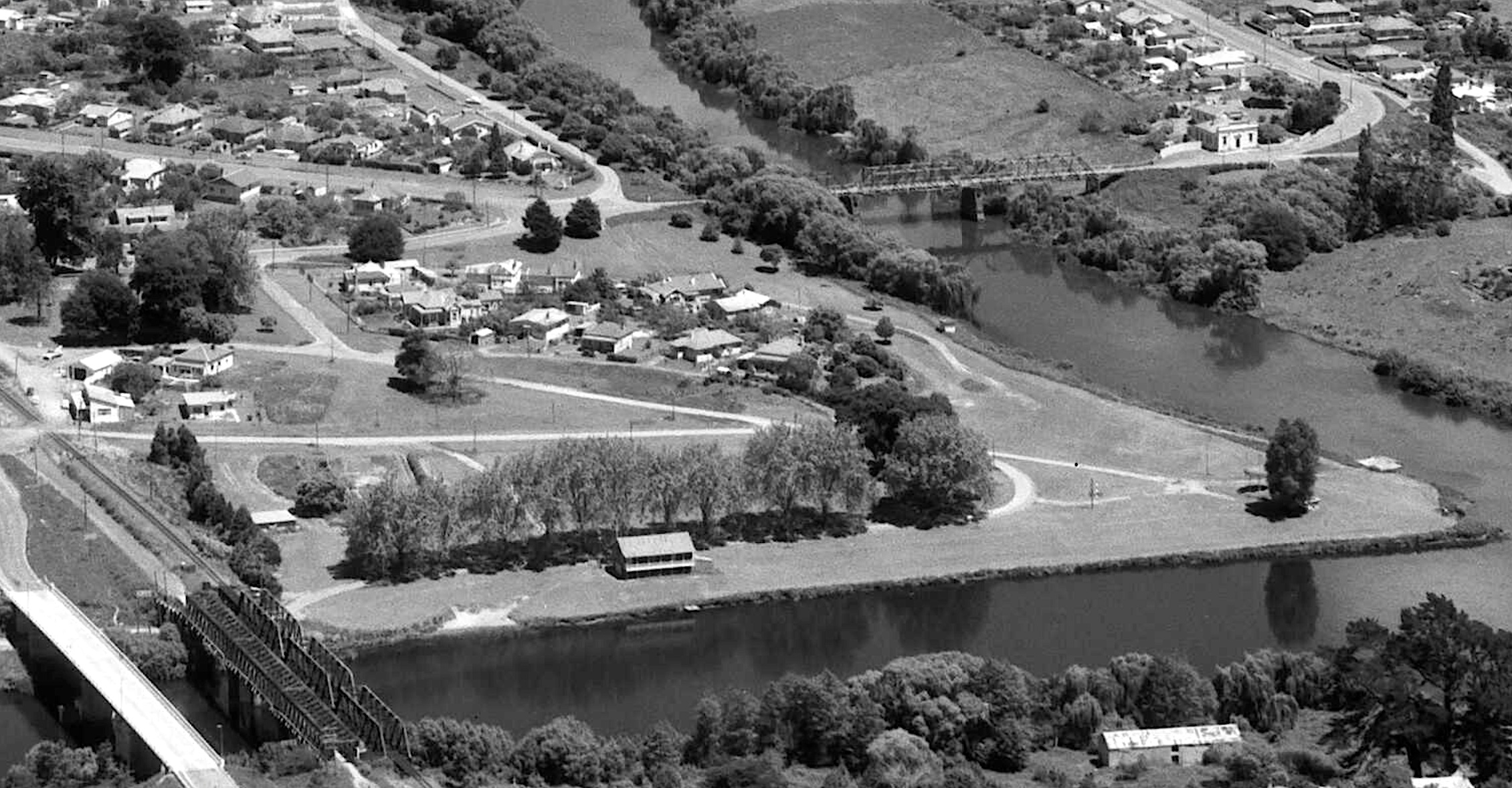
Ngāruawāhia in 1959, showing the Raglan County Council office, beside the Waipā bridge (top right)

From 1876 to 1888, Raglan County Council meetings were held in Raglan. However, Raglan wasn't central for the county, so meetings then alternated between Raglan and Whatawhata. On 15 May 1901, Raglan County held its first meeting in its new chambers at Ngāruawāhia, though continuing with at least an annual meeting in Raglan. In 1908, the council agreed to sell the old office for £227 10s. and build larger offices on the Raglan side of the Waipā Bridge. W. J. Smith of Raglan built them for £625. The new office opened in 1909. On 27 May 1961, a new £40,000, 16-room, brick building, on the Great South Road, was officially opened by the Minister of Works, Stanley Goosman. The old office was sold in 1961 and was being used as a loom factory, when it burnt down on 18 November 1971.

== Community Boards ==
Waikato District has 5 community boards covering Huntly, Ngāruawāhia and Raglan (formed 1989), Taupiri (added 1992) and Onewhero-Tuakau (added in 2010 covering part of the former Franklin District).

== Community Committees ==
The District also has 5 Community Committees for the townships of Meremere, Te Kauwhata (they had Community Boards from 1992 to 1995), and Tamahere ward, along with the North East Waikato Committee, covering Mangatawhiri, Mangatangi and Maramarua.

An extensive community master planning exercise was completed in 2019 resulting in the adoption by the Council of Community "BluePrints" to capture community aspirations and guide future development.

== See also ==
- Mayor of Waikato
- Waikato District Council
