= Mayor of Waikato =

Head of a municipal government in New Zealand

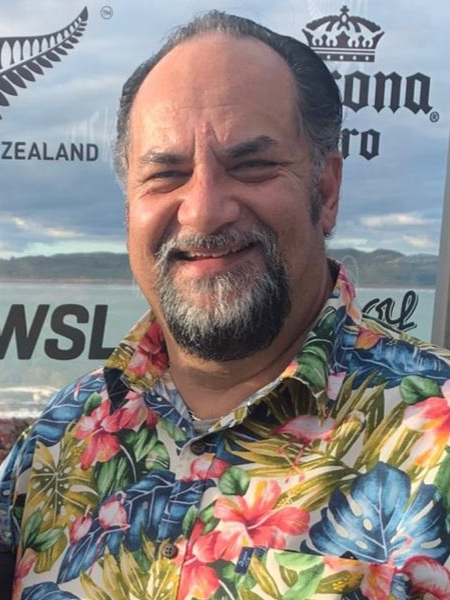
- Incumbent; Aksel Bech since 11 October 2025
- Style: His/Her Worship
- Member of: Waikato District Council
- Seat: Ngāruawāhia
- Term length: 3 years, renewable
- Formation: 1989
- Deputy: Eugene Patterson
- Salary: $157,039
- Website: Official website

The mayor of Waikato officiates over the Waikato District of New Zealand's North Island.

Aksel Bech is the current mayor, having been elected to the position in the 2025 local elections. The previous mayor (2022-25) was Jacqui Church and, before her, Allan Sanson, a third generation farmer who had served on the council since 2001 and had been mayor since 2010. His predecessor was another conservative farmer, Peter Harris, who took over the job when the first mayor, another farmer, Angus Macdonald, stood down in 2001. Angus Macdonald died in 2010. The 2021 salary of the mayor was $148,500.

== List of mayors ==
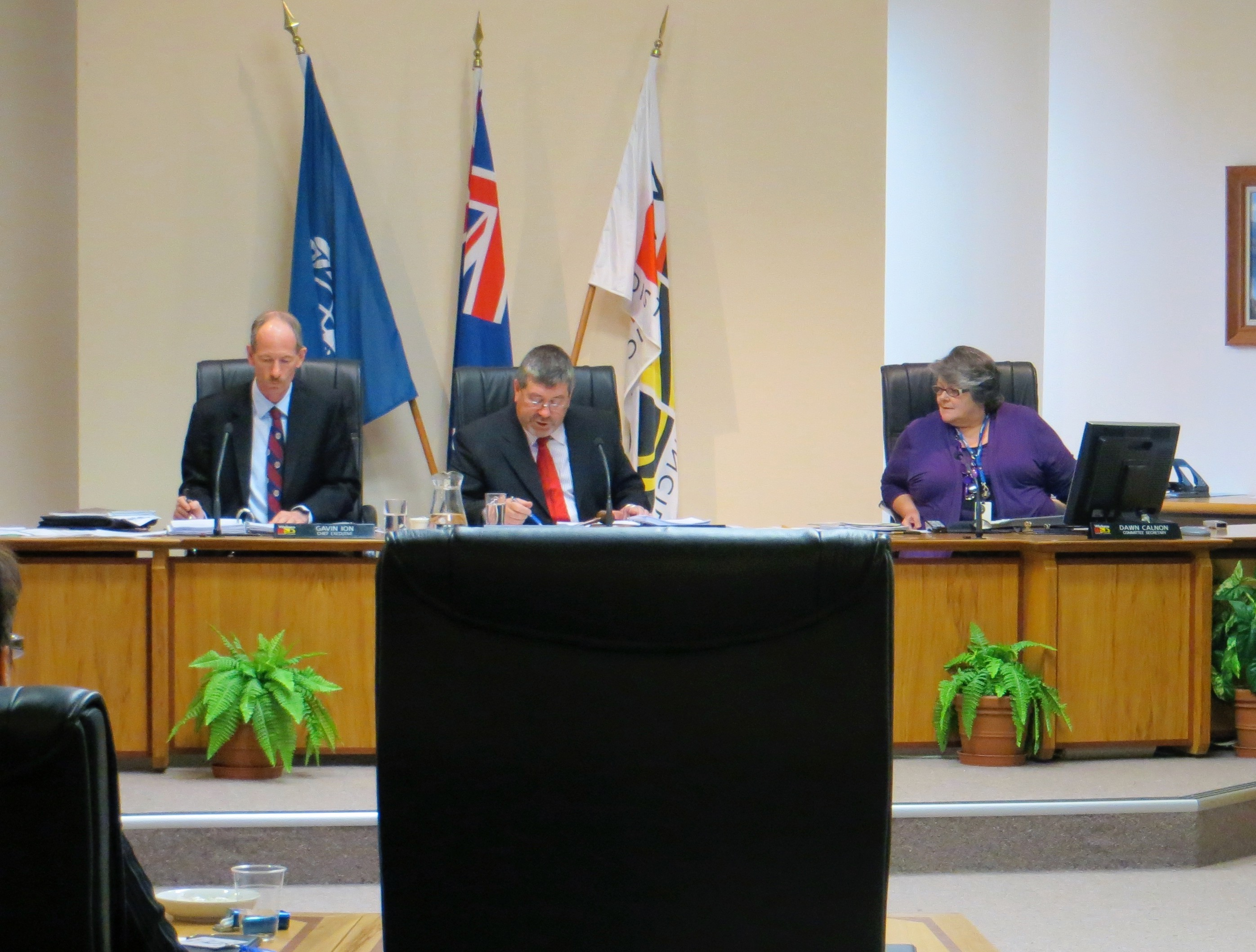
Waikato mayor (centre) in 2013

There have been five mayors of Waikato.

	Name	Portrait	Term
1	Angus Macdonald		1989–2001
2	Peter Harris		2001–2010
3	Allan Sanson		2010–2022
4	Jacqui Church		2022–2025
5	Aksel Bech		2025-present

== List of deputy mayors ==
Deputy	Term	Mayor
Peter Harris	–2001	Macdonald
Ian McLennan	–2007	Harris
Clint Baddeley	2007–2010	Harris
Dynes Fulton	2010–2019	Sanson
Aksel Bech	2019–2022	Sanson
Carolyn Eyre	2022–2025	Church
Eugene Patterson	2025–present	Bech
