= List of marae in Waikato =

This is a list of marae (Māori meeting grounds) in the Waikato region of New Zealand.

In October 2020, the Government committed $13,896,659 from the Provincial Growth Fund to upgrade 53 marae in the region, with the intention of creating 363 jobs.

== Waikato District ==
| Marae name | Wharenui name | Iwi and hapū | Location |
|---|---|---|---|
| Te Ākau | Te Ākau | Waikato Tainui (Ngāti Tāhinga, Tainui Hapū) | Te Ākau |
| Te Awamārahi | Te Ōhākī a Te Puea | Waikato Tainui (Ngāti Āmaru, Ngāti Pou, Ngāti Tiipa) | Onewhero |
| Horahora Marae | Te Whare i Whakaarohia | Waikato Tainui (Ngāti Hine, Ngāti Naho, Ngāti Pou, Ngāti Taratikitiki) | Rangiriri |
| Hukanui Marae | Te Tuturu-a-Papa Kamutu | Waikato Tainui (Ngāti Makirangi, Ngāti Wairere) | Gordonton |
| Te Iti a Hauā / Tauwhare | Hauā | Ngāti Hauā (Ngāti Te Oro, Ngāti Te Rangitaupi, Ngāti Waenganui, Ngāti Werewere), Waikato Tainui | Matangi |
| Aramiro | Te Kaharoa | Waikato Tainui (Ngāti Māhanga, Ngāti Tonganui), Ngāti Ruateatea, Ngāti Kuku | Raglan |
| Kaitumutumu | Ruateatea | Waikato Tainui (Ngāti Kuiaarangi, Ngāti Mahuta, Ngāti Tai, Ngāti Whāwhākia) | Huntly |
| Te Kauri | Karaka | Waikato Tainui (Ngāti Kuiaarangi, Ngāti Mahuta, Ngāti Tai, Ngāti Whāwhākia) | Huntly |
| Te Kōpua | No wharenui | Waikato Tainui (Tainui Hapū) | Raglan |
| Te Kotahitanga | Te Kotahitanga | Waikato Tainui (Ngāti Āmaru, Ngāti Apakura, Ngāti Tiipa) | Te Kohanga |
| Mai Uenuku ki te Whenua Marae | Mai Uenuku ki te Whenua | Waikato Tainui (Ngāti Tamainupō) | Raglan |
| Makomako Marae | Rangimarie | Ngāti Paoa | Miranda |
| Mangatangi | Marae Kirikiri | Ngāti Tamaoho, Waikato Tainui (Ngāi Tai, Ngāti Tamaoho, Ngāti Koheriki) | Mangatangi |
| Matahuru Papakainga | No wharenui | Ngāpuhi (Ngāti Tuapango), Waikato Tainui (Ngāti Hine, Ngāti Mahuta, Ngāti Naho) | Ohinewai |
| Maurea Marae | Ngā Tumutumu o Rauwhitu | Waikato Tainui (Ngāti Hine, Ngāti Naho, Ngāti Pou, Ngāti Taratikitiki) | Rangiriri |
| Mōtakotako / Taruke | Te Ōhākī a Mahuta | Waikato Tainui (Ngāti Mahuta, Ngāti Te Weehi, Tainui Hapū) | Aotea Harbour |
| Ngā Tai e Rua Marae | Ngā Tai e Rua | Waikato Tainui (Ngāti Āmaru, Ngāti Koheriki, Ngāti Tiipa) | Tuakau |
| Te Ōhākī | Te Ōhākī a Te Puea | Waikato Tainui (Ngāti Kuiaarangi, Ngāti Mahuta, Ngāti Tai, Ngāti Whāwhākia) | Huntly |
| Ōkarea | Pokaiwhenua | Waikato Tainui (Ngāti Tai, Ngāti Kuiaarangi, Ngāti Mahuta, Ngāti Whāwhākia) | Waerenga |
| Omaero Paa | Te Awaitaia | Waikato Tainui (Ngāti Māhanga, Ngāti Hourua, Ngāti Whare | Whatawhata |
| Ōraeroa | Whareroa | Waikato Tainui (Ngāti Tāhinga, Ngāti Tiipa) | Port Waikato |
| Te Papa o Rotu / Oneparepare | Te Papa o Rotu | Waikato Tainui (Ngāti Māhanga, Ngāti Hourua, Ngāti Whare, Ngāti Tamainupo) | Whatawhata |
| Te Papatapu / Te Wehi | Pare Whakarukuruku | Waikato Tainui (Ngāti Mahuta, Ngāti Te Weehi) | Aotea Harbour |
| Te Poho o Tanikena Marae | Te Poho o Tanikena | Waikato Tainui (Ngāti Tāhinga, Ngāti Taratikitiki, Tainui Hapū) | Glen Murray |
| Poihākena | Tainui a Whiro | Waikato Tainui (Ngāti Tāhinga, Tainui Hapū) | Raglan |
| Taniwha Marae | Me Whakatupu ki te Hua o te Rengarenga | Waikato Tainui (Ngāti Kuiaarangi, Ngāti Mahuta, Ngāti Tai, Ngāti Whāwhākia) | Waerenga |
| Tauhei | Māramatutahi | Waikato Tainui (Ngāti Makirangi, Ngāti Wairere) | Whitikahu |
| Taupiri Marae | Pani Ora, Te Puna Tangata | Waikato Tainui (Ngāti Kuiaarangi, Ngāti Mahuta, Ngāti Tai, Ngāti Whāwhākia) | Taupiri |
| Tauranganui | Rangiwahitu | Waikato Tainui (Ngāti Āmaru, Ngāti Tiipa) | Tuakau |
| Te Tihi o Moerangi | Te Tihi o Moerangi | Waikato Tainui (Ngāti Mahuta, Ngāti Te Weehi) | Aotea Harbour |
| Tikirahi / Tiki o te Rahi | Tikirahi | Waikato Tainui (Ngāti Tiipa) | Te Kōhanga |
| Tirohia Marae | No wharenui | Ngāti Rangi (Ngāti Hīoi) | Karioi |
| Tūrangawaewae | Mahinaarangi / Turongo | Waikato Tainui (Ngāti Mahuta, Ngāti Te Weehi) | Ngāruawāhia |
| Waahi Pa | Tāne i te Pupuke | Waikato Tainui (Ngāti Kuiaarangi, Ngāti Mahuta, Ngāti Tai, Ngāti Whāwhākia) | Huntly |
| Waikare Marae | Ngāti Hine | Waikato Tainui (Ngāti Hine, Ngāti Naho, Ngāti Pou, Ngāti Taratikitiki) | Te Kauwhata |
| Waikeri-Tangirau | Reko me Ōna Rito | Waikato Tainui (Ngāti Mahuta, Ngāti Te Weehi) | Ngāruawāhia |
| Waimakariri Marae | Waenganui | Ngāti Hauā (Ngāti Waenganui, Ngāti Waenganui), Waikato Tainui (Ngāti Hauā) | Tauwhare |
| Waingaro Marae | Ngā Tokotoru | Waikato Tainui (Ngāti Māhanga, Ngāti Tamainupo) | Waingaro |
| Weraroa Marae | Kupapa | Waikato Tainui (Ngāti Tāhinga, Tainui Hapū) | Te Ākau |
| Wharekawa | Paoa Whanaunga | Ngāti Paoa, Ngāti Whanaunga | Kaiaua |

== Hauraki District ==
| Marae name | Wharenui name | Iwi and hapū | Location |
|---|---|---|---|
| Taharua | Taharua | Ngāti Tamaterā | Paeroa |
| Te Pai o Hauraki | Te Pai o Hauraki | Ngāti Tamaterā | Paeroa |

== Thames Coromandel District ==
| Marae name | Wharenui name | Iwi and hapū | Location |
|---|---|---|---|
| Hikutaiā Marae | No wharenui | Ngāti Maru | Hikutaia |
| Te Mahau | Te Mahua | Ngāti Tūwharetoa (Ngāti Turumakina) | Waihi |
| Manaia Marae | Te Kou o Rehua | Ngāti Pūkenga, Ngāti Maru | Coromandel |
| Matai Whetū | Te Rama o Hauraki | Ngāti Maru | Kopu |
| Old Coromandel Hospital | No wharenui | Te Patukirikiri | Coromandel |
| Oturu | Ngatau Wiwi | Ngāti Maru | Tairua |
| Te Paea o Hauraki | Te Paea | Ngāti Tamaterā | Kennedy Bay |
| Waihī Marae | Tapeka | Ngāti Tūwharetoa (Ngāti Turumakina) | Waihī |

== Waipa District ==
| Marae name | Wharenui name | Iwi and hapū | Location |
|---|---|---|---|
| Aotearoa Marae | Hoturoa / Rangikawa | Ngāti Raukawa (Ngāti Takihiku), Waikato Tainui (Ngāti Korokī, Ngāti Raukawa ki Panehākua) | Wharepapa South |
| Kakepuku Marae | Papakainga | Ngāti Maniapoto (Kahu, Mākino, Matakore, Ngutu, Waiora) | Pokuru |
| Te Kōpua Marae | Ko Unu | Ngāti Maniapoto (Kahu, Unu), Waikato Tainui (Apakura, Ngāti Mahuta) | Pokuru |
| Maungatautari Marae | Te Manawanui | Ngāti Korokī Kahukura (Ngāti Hourua, Ngāti Ueroa), Ngāti Raukawa (Ngāti Korokī, Ngāti Mahuta), Waikato Tainui (Ngāti Korokī, Ngāti Raukawa ki Panehākua) | Maungatautari |
| Mangatoatoa | Te Maru o Ihowa | Ngāti Maniapoto (Ngutu, Pare te Kawa, Parewaeono), Waikato Tainui (Ngāti Ngutu, Ngāti Paretekawa) | Te Awamutu |
| Pārāwera Marae | Tāne-i-rangi-kapua | Ngāti Raukawa (Ngāti Ruru, Waenganui, Werokoko), Waikato Tainui (Ngāti Ruru, Ngāti Werokoko) | Parawera |
| Pōhara | Rangiātea | Ngāti Raukawa (Ngāti Korokī, Ngāti Mahuta), Ngāti Korokī Kahukura (Ngāti Hourua), Waikato Tainui (Ngāti Korokī, Ngāti Raukawa ki Panehākua) | Arapuni |
| Pūrekireki | Marutehiakina | Ngāti Maniapoto (Apakura, Hikairo), Waikato Tainui (Apakura) | Pirongia |
| Ōwairaka Rāwhitiroa | Takihiku | Ngāti Raukawa (Ngāti Kiri, Ngāti Takihiku, Ngāti Whakatere, Rereahu), Waikato Tainui (Ngāti Korokī, Ngāti Raukawa ki Panehākua) | Parawera |
| Waniwani Pā | No wharenui | Ngāti Korokī Kahukura (Ngāti Waihoro) | Maungatautari |

== Matamata-Piako District ==
| Marae name | Wharenui name | Iwi and hapū | Location |
|---|---|---|---|
| Hinerangi Tawhaki | Hinerangi Tawhaki | Ngāti Hinerangi (Ngāti Rangi, Ngāti Tamapango, Ngāti Tawhaki, Uri o Tangata) | Okauia |
| Hoe o Tainui | No wharenui | Waikato Tainui (Ngāti Makirangi) | Tahuna |
| Kai a Te Mata | Wairere | Ngāti Hauā (Ngāti Werewere), Waikato Tainui | Morrinsville |
| Raungaiti | Te Oro | Ngāti Hauā (Ngāti Rangi Tawhaki, Ngāti Te Oro), Waikato Tainui | Waharoa |
| Rengarenga Marae | No wharenui | Ngāti Raukawa (Ngāti Mōtai, Ngāti Te Apunga) | Te Poi |
| Rukumoana / The Top Pā | Werewere | Waikato Tainui, Ngāti Hauā (Ngāti Werewere), | Morrinsville |
| Tamapango | Tamapango | Ngāti Hinerangi (Ngāti Rangi, Ngāti Tamapango, Ngāti Tawhaki) | Okauia |
| Tangata Marae | Tangata | Ngāti Raukawa (Ngāti Hinerangi) | Okauia |
| Te Ōhākī | Te Ōhākī | Ngāti Hinerangi (Ngāti Kura, Ngāti Te Riha, Ngāti Tokotoko, Ngāti Whakamaungarangi) | Okauia |
| Te Omeka | Tiriki Teihaua | Ngāti Raukawa (Ngāti Kirihika) | Te Poi |
| Te Ūkaipō | Wehiwehi | Ngāti Raukawa (Ngāti Kirihika, Ngāti Wehiwehi) | Te Poi |
| Waiti / Raungaunu | Paoa | Waikato Tainui (Ngāti Makirangi), Ngāti Paoa | Tahuna |

== South Waikato District ==
| Marae name | Wharenui name | Iwi and hapū | Location |
|---|---|---|---|
| Mangakāretu | Ngā Hau e Maha | Ngāti Raukawa (Ngāti Ahuru) | Putāruru |
| Matiti Pā | Waotu Centennial Hall | Ngāti Raukawa (Ngāti Maihi) | Te Waotu |
| Ngātira | Te Tikanga a Tāwhiao | Ngāti Raukawa (Ngāti Ahuru), Waikato Tainui (Ngāti Korokī, Ngāti Raukawa ki Panehākua) | Tokoroa |
| Ōngāroto | Whaita | Ngāti Raukawa (Ngāti Whaita), Ngāti Tūwharetoa (Ngāti Te Kohera) | Tokoroa |
| Paparāmu | Te Apunga | Ngāti Raukawa (Ngāti Mōtai, Ngāti Te Apunga) | Tīrau |
| Pikitū | Huri | Ngāti Raukawa (Ngāti Huri) | Te Waotu |
| Ruapeka | Rangimarie | Ngāti Raukawa (Ngāti Tūkorehe) | Tapapa |
| Tāpapa Marae | No wharenui | Ngāti Raukawa (Ngāti Tūkorehe, Rangitawhia, Te Rangi) | Tapapa |
| Whakaaratamaiti | Korōria | Ngāti Raukawa (Ngāti Ahuru, Ngāti Mahana) | Putāruru |

== Taupo District ==
| Marae name | Wharenui name | Iwi and hapū | Location |
|---|---|---|---|
| Hīrangi | Tūwharetoa i te Aupōuri Marae | Ngāti Tūrangitukua, Ngāti Tūwharetoa (Ngāti Tūrangitukua) | Tūrangi |
| Korohē | Rereao | Ngāti Tūwharetoa (Ngāti Hine) | Tūrangi |
| Te Kōura | Te Karohirohi | Rereahu (Ngāti Pahere, Ngāti Urunumia) | Te Kōura |
| Maroanui Marae | Maroanui | Ngāti Tūwharetoa (Ngāti Hinerau) | Ohakuri |
| Miringa te Kakara | Te Whetū Marama o Ngā Tau o Hinawa | Maniapoto (Rereahu) | Mangakino |
| Mōkai Marae | Pakake Taiari | Ngāti Tūwharetoa (Ngāti Hā, Ngāti Moekino, Ngāti Parekāwa, Ngāti Tarakaiahi, Ngāti Te Kohera, Ngāti Wairangi), Ngāti Raukawa, Ngāti Hā, Ngāti Moekino, Ngāti Parekāwa, Ngāti Tarakaiahi, Ngāti Te Kohera, Waikato, Ngāti Whaita, Pouākani | Mōkai |
| Nukuhau Marae | Rauhoto | Ngāti Tūwharetoa (Ngāti Rauhoto, Ngāti Te Urunga) | Nukuhau |
| Ōruanui Marae | Te Kapa o te Rangiita | Ngāti Tūwharetoa (Ngāti Te Rangiita, Te Kapa o Te Rangiita) | Oruanui |
| Otūkou Marae | Okahukura | Ngāti Tūwharetoa (Ngāti Hikairo) | Otukou |
| Pouākani Marae | Tamatea Pokai Whenua | Ngāti Kahungunu ki Wairarapa | Mangakino |
| Poukura | Parekawa | Ngāti Tūwharetoa (Ngāti Parekāwa) | Kuratau |
| Pūkawa Marae | Manunui a Ruakapanga | Ngāti Tūwharetoa (Ngāti Manunui) | Pūkawa |
| Te Rangiita Marae | Te Rangiita | Ngāti Tūwharetoa (Ngāti Ruingarangi) | Nukuhau |
| Rongomai Marae | Rongomai | Ngāti Tūwharetoa (Ngāti Rongomai) | Tūrangi |
| Tokaanu Marae | Puhaorangi | Ngāti Tūwharetoa (Ngāti Kurauia) | Tokaanu |
| Waihāhā Marae | Haukapuanui | Ngāti Tūwharetoa (Ngāti Hā, Ngāti Tarakaiahi, Ngāti Wheoro), Ngāti Raukawa (Ngāti Hā) | Waihāhā |
| Waipahīhī Marae | Kurapoto | Ngāti Tūwharetoa (Ngāti Hinerau, Ngāti Hineure) | Waipahihi |
| Waitahanui Marae | Pākira | Ngāti Tūwharetoa (Ngāti Hinerau, Ngāti Tutemohuta) | Waitahanui |
| Waitahanui Bridge | No wharenui | Ngāti Tūwharetoa (Ngāti Tutetawhā) | Waitahanui |
| Waitetoko Marae | Te Kapua Whakapipi | Ngāti Tūwharetoa (Ngāti Te Rangiita) | Waitetoko |
| Whanganui Marae | Whanganui | Ngāti Tūwharetoa (Ngāti Te Maunga) | Waihāhā |

== Otorohanga District ==
| Marae name | Wharenui name | Iwi and hapū | Location |
|---|---|---|---|
| Hīona | Haona Kaha, Te Awananui | Maniapoto (Pourahui), Waikato Tainui (Apakura) | Puketotara |
| Kahotea | Whatihua | Maniapoto (Apakura, Hinetū, Matakore, Pare te Kawa), Waikato Tainui (Apakura) | Ōtorohanga |
| Maketū Marae | Auau ki te Rangi | Maniapoto (Apakura, Hikairo), Waikato Tainui (Ngāti Mahuta, Ngāti Te Weehi) | Kāwhia |
| Mōkai Kainga | Ko Te Mōkai | Maniapoto (Apakura, (Hikairo), Waikato Tainui (Apakura) | Kāwhia |
| Mokoroa | Ngā Roimata | Maniapoto (Ngati Kiriwai) | Kāwhia |
| Ōkapu | Te Kotahitanga o Ngāti Te Weehi | Waikato Tainui (Ngāti Mahuta, Ngāti Te Weehi) | Kāwhia |
| Otewa Pā | Ko Te Hokingamai ki te Nehenehenui | Maniapoto (Matakore, Ngutu, Parewaeono, Rereahu, Te Kanawa, Urunumia) | Otewa |
| Rākaunui | Moanakahakore | Maniapoto (Kerapa, Takiari, Te Waha), Waikato Tainui (Ngāti Ngutu, Ngāti Paretekawa) | Hauturu |
| Rereamanu | Te Kawau Kaki Maro | Maniapoto (Huiao, Te Kanawa) | Ōtorohanga |
| Tārewānga Marae | Te Rau a te Moa | Maniapoto (Pare te Kawa, Rungaterangi, Urunumia, Tārewānga) | Ōtorohanga |
| Te Keeti | Parewaeono | Maniapoto (Ngutu, Parewaeono, Urunumia) | Ōtorohanga |
| Te Kotahitanga | Te Kotahitanga | Maniapoto (Pourahi, Urunumia) | Ōtorohanga |
| Te Māhoe | No buildings | Maniapoto (Peehi, Te Kanawa, Te Urupare, Uekaha) | Kāwhia |
| Te Whakaaro Kotahi | No wharenui in use | Maniapoto (Te Kanawa) | Te Kawa |
| Turitea Marae | No buildings | Maniapoto (Pourahui) | Ōtorohanga |
| Waipapa Marae | Ngā Tai Whakarongorua, Takuhiahia | Maniapoto (Hikairo), Waikato Tainui (Ngāti Hikairo, Ngāti Puhiawe) | Kāwhia |
| Whakamārama | Te Rangimoeakau | Ngāti Raukawa (Ngāti Puehutore) | Waikeria |

== Waitomo District ==
| Marae name | Wharenui name | Iwi and hapū | Location |
|---|---|---|---|
| Te Ahoroa | Tapairu | Maniapoto (Pare, Rereahu), Rereahu (Ngāti Paretapoko) | Rangitoto |
| Āruka | Tahaaroa | Maniapoto (Hikairo), Waikato Tainui (Ngāti Mahuta, Ngāti Te Weehi) | Tahāroa |
| Te Hape | Te Kaha Tuatini | Maniapoto (Matakore, Ngutu, Pare, Raukawa, Rereahu, Te Ihingarangi) | Benneydale |
| Kaputuhi | Kaputuhi | Maniapoto (Matakore, Pare te Kawa, Peehi, Rōrā) | Waitomo |
| Te Kauae | Te Kauae o Niu Tereni | Maniapoto (Huiao, Kinohaku, Peehi, Te Kanawa) | Waitomo |
| Te Kawau Papakainga | Waiopapa | Maniapoto (Ngāti Rākei, Rōrā, Rungaterangi) | Mōkau |
| Te Kōraha | Te Ōhākī | Maniapoto (Hikairo), Waikato Tainui (Ngāti Mahuta, Ngāti Te Weehi) | Tahāroa |
| Te Korapatu | Te Korapatu | Maniapoto (Peehi, Te Kanawa) | Waitomo |
| Te Kumi | Te Korapatu | Maniapoto (Peehi, Rōrā) | Te Kūiti |
| Mangapeehi | Rereahu | Maniapoto (Matakore, Ngutu, Pare, Raukawa, Rereahu, Te Ihingarangi), Rereahu (Ngāti Ngutu, Ngāti Pikiahu, Ngāti Te Peehi, Ngāti Waewae, Ngāti Whakatere) | Benneydale |
| Mangarama | Rongorongo | Maniapoto (Apakura) | Te Mapara |
| Maniaroa Marae | Maniaroa | Maniapoto (Ngāti Rākei, Rungaterangi, Waiora) | Awakino |
| Marokopa Marae | Miromiro i te Pō | Maniapoto (Kinohaku, Te Kanawa, Peehi) | Marokopa |
| Mōkau Kohunui | Ko Tama Tāne | Maniapoto (Apakura, Kinohaku, Waiora) | Piopio |
| Mōtītī | Ko te Hungaiti / Hapainga | Maniapoto (Kinohaku, Putaitemuri, Tauhunu) | Te Kūiti |
| Napinapi | Parekahoki | Maniapoto (Matakore, Pare te Kawa) | Piopio |
| Te Paemate | Te Paemate | Maniapoto (Paemate) | Piopio |
| Te Piruru Papakainga | Te Pukenui o Taonui | Maniapoto (Rōrā) | Te Kūiti |
| Pohatuiri | No wharenui | Maniapoto (Uekaha) | Waitomo |
| Tāne Hopuwai | Tāne Hopuwai | Maniapoto (Apakura) | Te Kūiti |
| Te Tokanganui a Noho | Te Tokanganui a Noho | Maniapoto (Rōrā) | Te Kūiti |
| Tokikapu | Matua a Iwi | Maniapoto (Ruapuha, Te Kanawa, Uekaha) | Waitomo |
| Tomotuki | Parekatini | Maniapoto (Apakura, Parekaitini, Rōrā) | Te Kūiti |
| Oparure | Waipatoto, Waipatoto Tuarua | Maniapoto (Kinohaku) | Oparure |

== See also ==
- Lists of marae in New Zealand
- List of schools in Waikato
