= Awaroa River (Kawhia Harbour tributary) =

River in New Zealand

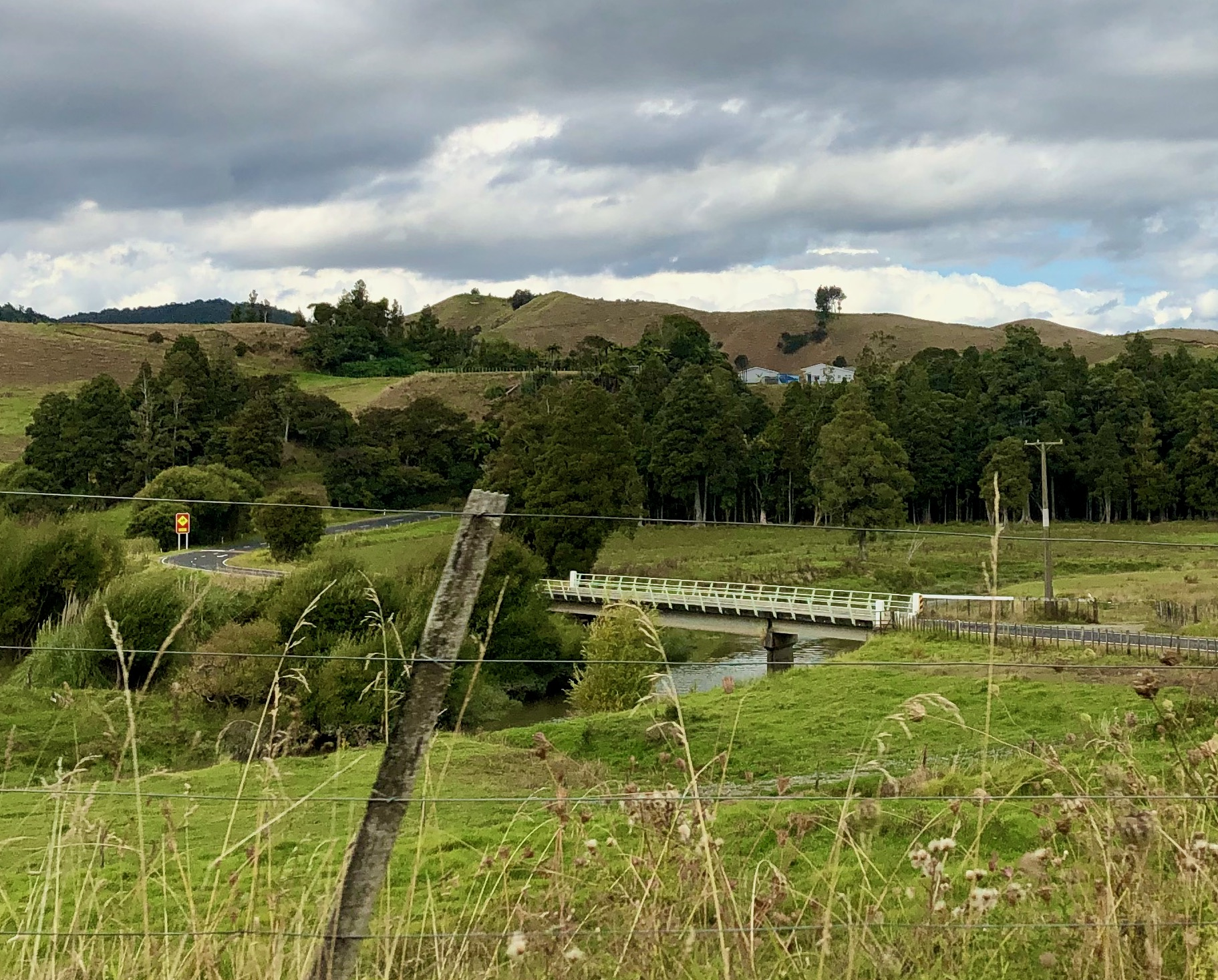
- Awaroa River bridge and Hauturu in 2019

- Location within New Zealand

Location
- Country: New Zealand

Physical characteristics
- Source
  - location: near Te Koraha
  - elevation: 519 m (1,703 ft)
- Mouth
  - location: Kawhia Harbour
  - coordinates: 38°05′23″S 174°54′54″E
  - elevation: 0 m (0 ft)
- Length: 28 km (17 mi)
- Basin size: 109 km^{2} (42 sq mi)

The Awaroa River is a river in the Ōtorohanga District on the west coast of New Zealand's North Island. It flows north from its source near Te Koraha through Hauturu to Kawhia Harbour. The river passes through both pasture and indigenous forest. Over half of the river is in forest.

The name translates to "long river". It is a name used by 33 other locations, including two waterways in Northland (Awaroa River and another, rather longer, flowing into the Wairoa River), a river north of Kaiteretere and 9 in Waikato Region (Awaroa River and 2 streams, flowing into the Waikato, one flowing into Lake Whangape, another into Lake Waahi, another stream flowing into the Piako River, 2 Awaroa Streams in Coromandel, one flowing into Kennedy Bay and a tributary of the Opitonui River).

The bridge carrying Harbour Road over the river was originally built in 1930. In 1922 a launch ran from Kawhia to Awaroa, with a coach connection to Ōtorohanga.

Veronica scopulorum ‘Awaroa’ is a naturally uncommon hebe, endemic to about half a dozen limestone outcrops in the head waters of the Awaroa River and northern Taumatatotara Range. It is threatened by weed invasion, forest degradation and goat and possum browse.

Awaroa Scenic Reserve, at the river's estuary, covers 692.84 ha (1,712.0 acres) and has the fern Ophioglossum coriaceum, the orchid Bulbophyllum tuberculatum and the mistletoe Peraxilla tetrapetala. The estuary upstream from Uenukutuhatu Rock has mangrove, seagrass, freshwater marsh clubrush and regenerating bush, with invasive black locust trees.

Some coal was discovered in the valley in 1903, but its quality was too poor to mine.

The river was once used for navigation; in 1924 launch owners asked for willows to be removed. A 1981 report said the willows didn't hinder navigation, but launches could only go as far as the road bridge.
