= Glen Murray =

Glen Murray may refer to:

== People ==
- Glen Murray (ice hockey) (born 1972), Canadian former ice hockey right winger
- Glen Murray (politician) (born 1957), Canadian politician

== Places ==
- Glen Murray, New Zealand, a locality in the former Franklin District

== See also ==
- Glenn Murray (born 1983), English footballer
- Glenn Murray (baseball) (born 1970), baseball player
