= Okahukura =

Okahukura in New Zealand may refer to:

- Okahukura, Manawatū-Whanganui, a locality in Ruapehu District to the north of Taumarunui

- Okahukura railway station, serving the settlement of Okahukura

- Okahukura Peninsula, a peninsula in the Kaipara Harbour
- Otukou, the location of Okahukura meeting house and Okahukura Bush, in Taupo District
- Albany, New Zealand, a suburb in Auckland known as Ōkahukura in Māori
