= Hauturu =

Hauturu can refer to:

- Little Barrier Island or Hauturu which is an island in the Hauraki Gulf in New Zealand
- Hauturu Island which is near Whangamatā on the Coromandel Peninsula in New Zealand
- Hauturu, Waikato a village in Otorohanga District, North Island, New Zealand
