= Pokuru, New Zealand =

Settlement in Waikato, New Zealand

Pokuru
- Village
- Interactive map of Pokuru
- Coordinates: 38.056049°S 175.235353°E
- Country: New Zealand
- Region: Waikato
- District: Waipā District
- Ward: Pirongia-Kakepuku General Ward
- Community: Te Awamutu Community
- Electorates: Taranaki-King Country; Te Tai Hauāuru (Māori)

Government
  - Territorial Authority: Waipā District Council
  - Regional council: Waikato Regional Council
  - Mayor of Waipa: Mike Pettit
  - Taranaki-King Country MP: Barbara Kuriger
  - Te Tai Hauāuru MP: Debbie Ngarewa-Packer

Area
  - Territorial: 20.08 km^{2} (7.75 sq mi)

Population (2023 Census)
  - Territorial: 237
  - Density: 11.8/km^{2} (30.6/sq mi)
- Time zone: UTC+12 (NZST)
  - Summer (DST): UTC+13 (NZDT)

Pokuru is a rural community in the Waipā District and Waikato region of New Zealand's North Island.

It is located southwest of Te Awamutu, southeast of Pirongia and north of Ōtorohanga, between State Highway 39 and State Highway 1.

== Marae ==
The community of Pokuru has two marae:

- Kakepuku Marae and Papakainga meeting house is a meeting place of the Ngāti Maniapoto hapū of Kahu, Mākino, Ngāti Matakore, Ngutu and Waiora.
- Te Kōpua Marae and Ko Unu meeting house is a meeting place of the Ngāti Maniapoto hapū of Kahu and Unu, and the Waikato Tainui hapū of Apakura and Ngāti Mahuta.

== Demographics ==
Pokuru settlement and its surrounds cover 20.08 km^{2} (7.75 sq mi). The settlement is part of the larger Pokuru statistical area.

Historical population for Pokuru and surrounds
Year	Pop.	±% p.a.
2006	171	—
2013	198	+2.12%
2018	207	+0.89%
2023	237	+2.74%

Pokuru had a population of 237 in the 2023 New Zealand census, an increase of 30 people (14.5%) since the 2018 census, and an increase of 39 people (19.7%) since the 2013 census. There were 120 males, 114 females, and 3 people of other genders in 72 dwellings. 2.5% of people identified as LGBTIQ+. The median age was 35.1 years (compared with 38.1 years nationally). There were 57 people (24.1%) aged under 15 years, 45 (19.0%) aged 15 to 29, 108 (45.6%) aged 30 to 64, and 27 (11.4%) aged 65 or older.

People could identify as more than one ethnicity. The results were 84.8% European (Pākehā), 15.2% Māori, 2.5% Pasifika, 7.6% Asian, and 7.6% other, which includes people giving their ethnicity as "New Zealander". English was spoken by 96.2%, Māori by 2.5%, and other languages by 7.6%. No language could be spoken by 2.5% (e.g. too young to talk). The percentage of people born overseas was 19.0, compared with 28.8% nationally.

Religious affiliations were 27.8% Christian, 1.3% Māori religious beliefs, 1.3% New Age, and 3.8% other religions. People who answered that they had no religion were 59.5%, and 6.3% of people did not answer the census question.

Of those at least 15 years old, 45 (25.0%) people had a bachelor's or higher degree, 102 (56.7%) had a post-high school certificate or diploma, and 39 (21.7%) people exclusively held high school qualifications. The median income was $54,300, compared with $41,500 nationally. 24 people (13.3%) earned over $100,000 compared to 12.1% nationally. The employment status of those at least 15 was 99 (55.0%) full-time and 30 (16.7%) part-time.

=== Pokuru statistical area ===
Pokuru statistical area covers 108.79 km^{2} (42.00 sq mi) and had an estimated population of 1,660 as of June 2025, with a population density of 15 people per km^{2}.

Historical population for the statistical area
Year	Pop.	±% p.a.
2006	1,167	—
2013	1,251	+1.00%
2018	1,416	+2.51%
2023	1,527	+1.52%
The 2006 population is for a larger area of 109.20 km^{2}. Source:

Pokuru had a population of 1,527 in the 2023 New Zealand census, an increase of 111 people (7.8%) since the 2018 census, and an increase of 276 people (22.1%) since the 2013 census. There were 777 males, 744 females, and 3 people of other genders in 516 dwellings. 1.4% of people identified as LGBTIQ+. The median age was 37.3 years (compared with 38.1 years nationally). There were 354 people (23.2%) aged under 15 years, 255 (16.7%) aged 15 to 29, 681 (44.6%) aged 30 to 64, and 237 (15.5%) aged 65 or older.

People could identify as more than one ethnicity. The results were 89.6% European (Pākehā); 15.9% Māori; 1.8% Pasifika; 2.9% Asian; 0.6% Middle Eastern, Latin American and African New Zealanders (MELAA); and 2.6% other, which includes people giving their ethnicity as "New Zealander". English was spoken by 97.1%, Māori by 3.7%, and other languages by 4.3%. No language could be spoken by 2.2% (e.g. too young to talk). New Zealand Sign Language was known by 0.4%. The percentage of people born overseas was 13.4, compared with 28.8% nationally.

Religious affiliations were 30.3% Christian, 0.6% Māori religious beliefs, 0.2% Buddhist, 0.4% New Age, and 0.8% other religions. People who answered that they had no religion were 59.1%, and 8.8% of people did not answer the census question.

Of those at least 15 years old, 237 (20.2%) people had a bachelor's or higher degree, 660 (56.3%) had a post-high school certificate or diploma, and 267 (22.8%) people exclusively held high school qualifications. The median income was $51,600, compared with $41,500 nationally. 174 people (14.8%) earned over $100,000 compared to 12.1% nationally. The employment status of those at least 15 was 633 (54.0%) full-time, 192 (16.4%) part-time, and 15 (1.3%) unemployed.

== Education ==
Pokuru School is a co-educational state primary school, with a roll of 137 as of July 2026. The school opened as Kakepuku School in 1907, and became Pokuru School in 1926.
