= Benneydale =

Settlement in Waikato, New Zealand

Maniaiti / Benneydale
- Rural settlement
- Interactive map of Maniaiti / Benneydale
- Coordinates: 38°31′14.06″S 175°21′45.71″E
- Country: New Zealand
- Region: Waikato region
- District: Waitomo District
- Ward: Waitomo Rural Ward
- Electorates: Taranaki-King Country; Te Tai Hauāuru (Māori)

Government
  - Territorial Authority: Waitomo District Council
  - Regional council: Waikato Regional Council
  - Mayor of Waitomo: John Robertson
  - Taranaki-King Country MP: Barbara Kuriger
  - Hauraki-Waikato MP: Hana-Rawhiti Maipi-Clarke

Area
  - Total: 0.58 km^{2} (0.22 sq mi)

Population (June 2025)
  - Total: 250
  - Density: 430/km^{2} (1,100/sq mi)
- Postcode(s): 3987

Maniaiti / Benneydale is a small town in the Waitomo District. It is on State Highway 30, approximately 35 km (22 mi) southeast of Te Kūiti.

== History ==
=== Coal township ===
Coal was discovered in the area in 1931, and a mine was built at the town's present location. In 1940 the government bought the mine and created the township of Benneydale. Its name is a portmanteau of the undersecretary of mines at the time (Matt Benney) and the mine superintendent (Tom Dale). It was the only town in the King Country that does not have a Māori name.

At its peak the town had a population of 2000 with a butchery, bakery and picture theatre. There were jobs in the coal mine until the early 1990s, but like many other rural areas in New Zealand the town has slowly declined.

=== Modern history ===
Bush United is the town's local rugby union club, the clubhouse was built at Pureora in 1960 and was moved to Benneydale.

Bennydale now mainly operates as a farm service town and it is the closest town to the Timber Trail in the Pureora Forest Park. The town has a police station, volunteer fire brigade, a garage, a corner store that sells hot food and basic groceries, a cafe with accommodation, and a primary school. There is also a meat works on the outskirts of town.

In 2018 the Maniapoto Māori Trust Board lodged an application to the New Zealand Geographic Board to change the name to Maniaiti, which means "a small slide, slip" and is the name of a hill behind the township. It was decided that it would have a dual name of Maniaiti / Benneydale. There was substantial local opposition to the name change.

== Demographics ==
Statistics New Zealand describes Maniaiti/Benneydale as a rural settlement, which covers 0.58 km^{2} (0.22 sq mi). It had an estimated population of 250 as of June 2025, with a population density of 431 people per km^{2}. The settlement is part of the larger Waipa Valley statistical area.

Historical population for Maniaiti/Benneydale
Year	Pop.	±% p.a.
2006	210	—
2013	180	−2.18%
2018	189	+0.98%
2023	237	+4.63%

Maniaiti/Benneydale had a population of 237 in the 2023 New Zealand census, an increase of 48 people (25.4%) since the 2018 census, and an increase of 57 people (31.7%) since the 2013 census. There were 120 males, 114 females, and 3 people of other genders in 78 dwellings. 1.3% of people identified as LGBTIQ+. The median age was 32.7 years (compared with 38.1 years nationally). There were 45 people (19.0%) aged under 15 years, 54 (22.8%) aged 15 to 29, 114 (48.1%) aged 30 to 64, and 24 (10.1%) aged 65 or older.

People could identify as more than one ethnicity. The results were 48.1% European (Pākehā); 58.2% Māori; 8.9% Pasifika; 8.9% Asian; 1.3% Middle Eastern, Latin American and African New Zealanders (MELAA); and 2.5% other, which includes people giving their ethnicity as "New Zealander". English was spoken by 97.5%, Māori by 11.4%, Samoan by 2.5%, and other languages by 2.5%. No language could be spoken by 2.5% (e.g. too young to talk). The percentage of people born overseas was 19.0, compared with 28.8% nationally.

Religious affiliations were 25.3% Christian, 2.5% Islam, 2.5% Māori religious beliefs, and 1.3% New Age. People who answered that they had no religion were 58.2%, and 10.1% of people did not answer the census question.

Of those at least 15 years old, 9 (4.7%) people had a bachelor's or higher degree, 96 (50.0%) had a post-high school certificate or diploma, and 81 (42.2%) people exclusively held high school qualifications. The median income was $28,800, compared with $41,500 nationally. 3 people (1.6%) earned over $100,000 compared to 12.1% nationally. The employment status of those at least 15 was 96 (50.0%) full-time, 21 (10.9%) part-time, and 9 (4.7%) unemployed.

=== Waipa Valley statistical area ===
Waipa Valley statistical area, which also includes Rangitoto, covers 817.65 km^{2} (315.70 sq mi) and had an estimated population of 1,320 as of June 2025, with a population density of 1.6 people per km^{2}.

Historical population for Waipa Valley
Year	Pop.	±% p.a.
2006	1,269	—
2013	1,251	−0.20%
2018	1,221	−0.48%
2023	1,269	+0.77%

Waipa Valley had a population of 1,269 in the 2023 New Zealand census, an increase of 48 people (3.9%) since the 2018 census, and an increase of 18 people (1.4%) since the 2013 census. There were 660 males, 603 females, and 6 people of other genders in 483 dwellings. 1.4% of people identified as LGBTIQ+. The median age was 39.7 years (compared with 38.1 years nationally). There were 261 people (20.6%) aged under 15 years, 225 (17.7%) aged 15 to 29, 594 (46.8%) aged 30 to 64, and 189 (14.9%) aged 65 or older.

People could identify as more than one ethnicity. The results were 73.5% European (Pākehā); 32.2% Māori; 3.5% Pasifika; 4.3% Asian; 0.5% Middle Eastern, Latin American and African New Zealanders (MELAA); and 5.2% other, which includes people giving their ethnicity as "New Zealander". English was spoken by 97.4%, Māori by 6.6%, Samoan by 0.5%, and other languages by 4.7%. No language could be spoken by 1.9% (e.g. too young to talk). New Zealand Sign Language was known by 0.5%. The percentage of people born overseas was 10.9, compared with 28.8% nationally.

Religious affiliations were 27.9% Christian, 0.2% Hindu, 0.7% Islam, 3.5% Māori religious beliefs, 0.2% Buddhist, 0.5% New Age, and 0.7% other religions. People who answered that they had no religion were 58.9%, and 7.6% of people did not answer the census question.

Of those at least 15 years old, 144 (14.3%) people had a bachelor's or higher degree, 576 (57.1%) had a post-high school certificate or diploma, and 291 (28.9%) people exclusively held high school qualifications. The median income was $40,600, compared with $41,500 nationally. 81 people (8.0%) earned over $100,000 compared to 12.1% nationally. The employment status of those at least 15 was 588 (58.3%) full-time, 144 (14.3%) part-time, and 27 (2.7%) unemployed.

== Marae ==
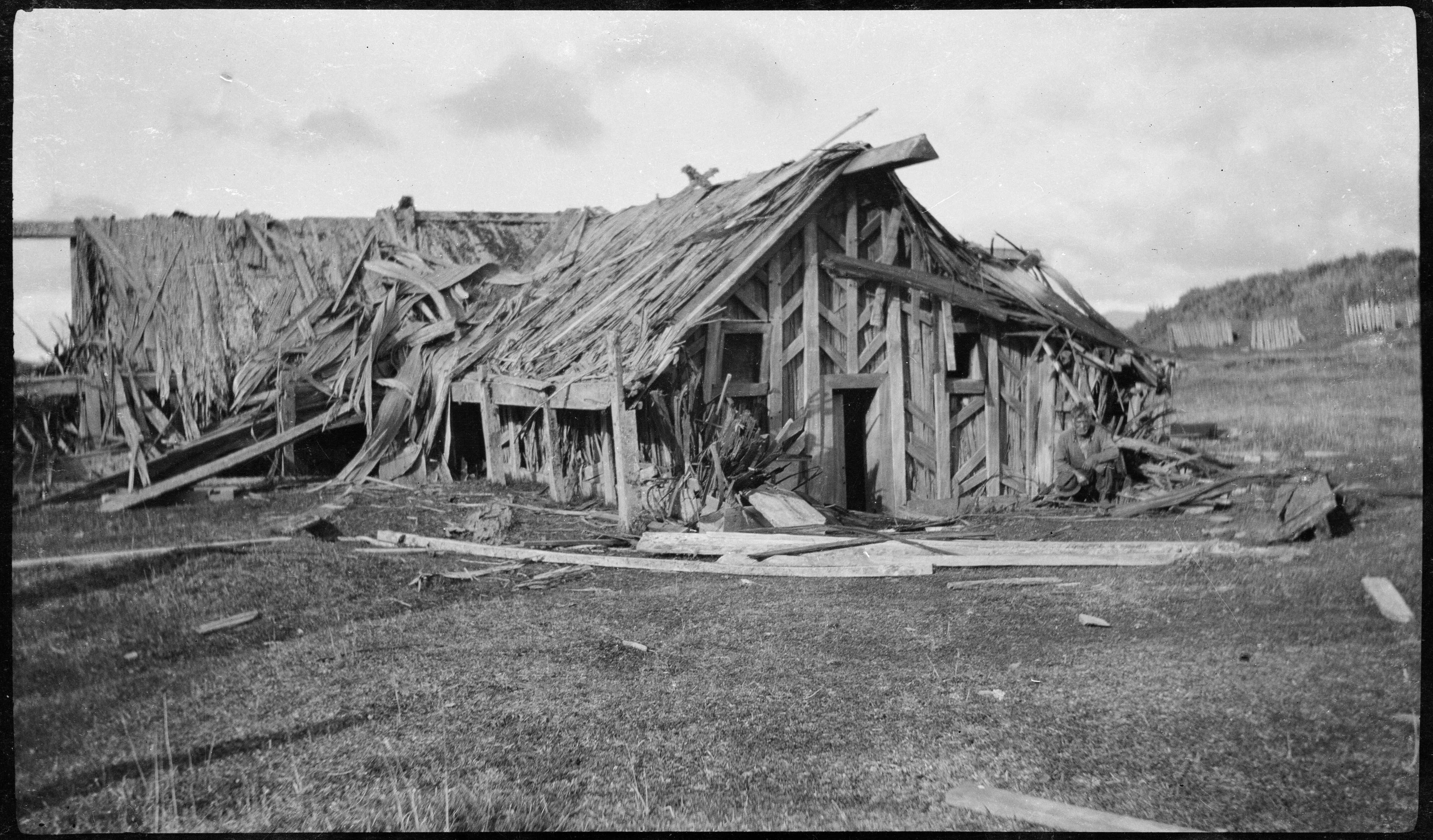
Te Miringa te Kakara, circa 1920

Mangapeehi Marae is located near Benneydale. It is a meeting ground for the Ngāti Maniapoto hapū of Ngāti Matakore, Ngutu, Pare, Raukawa, Rereahu and Te Ihingarangi, and features the Rereahu meeting house.

Te Miringa te Kakara, a local meeting house, is located one kilometre from Benneydale, between Benneydale and Tiroa

Te Hape Marae and Te Kaha Tuatini meeting house is located east of Benneydale; it is a meeting place for the Rereahu hapū of Ngāti Te Rā and Ngāti Tuwhakahekeao.

== Education ==
Benneydale School is a co-educational state primary school, with a roll of 28 as of July 2026. The school opened in 1945. In 1961 a district high school opened next door. It changed to Bennydale Area School in 1978, with the primary school incorporated. In 1996, the school became a full primary school covering years 1 to 8.

== Notable people ==
- Keith Quinn, sports broadcaster
