= Lake Whangape =

- Lake Whangape is in the Waikato region of the North Island.
- Location: Waikato District, Waikato region, North Island
- Coordinates: 37°28′S 175°03′E
- Lake type: riverine lake
- Primary inflows: Awaroa Stream (NB a different stream, with the same name, further south, flows into Lake Waahi)
- Primary outflows: Whangape Stream
- Catchment area: 310 km^{2} (120 sq mi)
- Basin countries: New Zealand
- Max. length: 7 km (4.3 mi)
- Surface area: 1,450 ha (3,600 acres)
- Average depth: 1.5 m (4 ft 11 in)
- Max. depth: 2.7 m (8 ft 10 in)
- Shore length^{1}: 29 km (18 mi)
- Surface elevation: 5 m (16 ft)
- Islands: Motukauere Is, Roaroa Is
- ^{1} Shore length is not a well-defined measure.

Lake Whangape (also written as Wangape, Whangapu, or Whangapae) is shallow, supertrophic, lateral and the second largest lake (after Lake Waikare) in the lower Waikato River basin in New Zealand. One source said the name translated to 'a large sheet of water', another that it was a chief's name.

From the 1860s the catchment has lost most of its forest cover and the lake has changed from clear and rich in aquatic vegetation to a murky, algal lake.

== Geology ==
The lake is a lateral lake, dammed by a levee of the Waikato, probably built up as a result of sea-level rise and sediment from the Taupō Volcanic Zone about 2,000 years ago.

To the west of the lake the rocks are made up of the 30m year old (Tertiary) Whaingaroa and Glen Massey Formations, the Whaingaroan rocks of the Te Kuiti Group. The Karapiro Formation (part of the Walton subgroup) outcrops towards the east of the lake.

=== Hot springs ===
Two springs (ranging from 65 °C (149 °F) to 93 °C (199 °F) and many seepages occur along Te Maire Stream, a tributary of the main lake feeder, Awaroa Stream, about 9 km (5.6 mi) west of the lake. They are close to a contact between outcropping Early Jurassic “greywacke basement” and the overlying Tertiary rocks consisting of claystones, limestones and sandstones. It has been suggested that Waikorea, Naike and Waingaro may all source their water from depths of more than 3,000 m (9,800 ft), as they all have similar chemical composition.

The springs have been named as Whangape, Awaroa, Naike, Waiora, Te Maire, or Te Puia. In the 1890s boat trips were made to the springs from Rangiriri. In 1868 the temperature was measured at 168 °F (76 °C). A 1905 earthquake enlarged the main spring. The springs are on private land and not now open to the public.

== History ==
The lake was on the edge of the area which Ngāti Tipa had settled. At the entrance to the lake, Ngāpuhi killed 40 or 50, during the Musket Wars in 1832. In 1843, Rev. Benjamin Ashwell intervened in a dispute between Ngāti Pou and Ngāti Mahuta over an eel (tuna) weir at the lake outlet. It seems it wasn't fully resolved, for, in 1866, a similar dispute was settled by giving the Ngāti Mahuta hapū, Ngāti Naho and Ngāti Tipa, equal rights over tuna at the lake.

In 1864, the Whangape area was described as inaccessible to the British troops in the Invasion of the Waikato, due to the swamps and bush.

Whangape was one of 5 ridings making up Raglan County Council when it was formed in 1876.

In the confiscated area, which included the lake, as part of a policy of opening up land for settlement under the deferred payment scheme, the Government built bridleways from the river, to give access to two 20,000 acres (8,100 ha) blocks. A 12 mi (19 km) road to Awaroa was approved in 1878. The northernmost of the 2 routes began at Churchill, a settlement which then stood on the west bank of the river about 4 mi (6.4 km) west of Rangiriri. By 1881, 10 mi (16 km) had been opened as far as Glen Murray, through heavy swamp at the Churchill end. By 1883 a through track from the Waikato River to the West Coast was in existence. At the same time another was built from south of the lake, towards the Awaroa. By the middle of 1883, nearly 24 mi (39 km) had been opened Work began on roads at Rangiriri in 1889, the first section being to the lake.

However, the surrounding roads remained poor, so the lake and its neighbouring streams were used for transport, a Whangape Launch Company being set up in 1906 to convey goods from Rangiriri. Earlier, in 1894, Parliament had been asked to "have obstructions in the shape of eel weirs removed from the navigable creeks flowing from Whangape Lake into the Waikato River, so as to enable steamers now running on the Waikato River to carry goods for settlers in that district." In 1889 the weir had been partly removed to allow a boat to get through.

== Water levels ==
Between 1968 and 2000 the water level in Lake Whangape fluctuated between 4.5 m (15 ft) and 7.941 m (26.05 ft) above sea level. Water flows into the lake from the Waikato River, when it is high. Since 1999 a weir at the outlet has maintained the minimum water level at 5 m (16 ft).

== Pollution ==
Until at least 1869 the lake was clear enough to see plants growing in the deepest parts and it supported a diverse community of native submerged vegetation. In the 1890s the native forest catchment was cleared for pasture.

A 2006 Ministry for the Environment report said water quality was declining. Frequent monitoring by Waikato Regional Council from 2008 to 2013 showed a Secchi depth of 0.04 m to 0.69 m (average 0.24 m) and chlorophyll concentrations exceeding 100 mg m-3. Between 2010 and 2014, 62% of samples exceeded recreational guideline levels for blue-green algae. A health warning was also issued in 2020.

== Wildlife ==
Parts of the lake and wetlands around it were gazetted as a Wildlife Management Reserve of 1,330.37 ha (3,287.4 acres) in 1986. To the west, Awaroa Wildlife Management Reserve extends 2.3 km (1.4 mi) up the Awaroa Stream, on 308 ha (760 acres) of the floodplain.

=== Aquatic vegetation ===
Thomas Kirk's 1869 survey found a diverse, low growing mixed plant association. Quillwort (Isoetes kirkii), fennel pondweed, blunt pondweed (Potamogeton ochreatus) and red pondweed (Potamogeton cheesemanii) were abundant, waterwort (Elatine gratioloides), horses mane weed and horned pondweed were common and Lepilaena bilocularis and green algae (charophytes - corallina, fibrosa, globularis, Nitella hyalina and Nitella leptostachys) were also present. The only charophytes remaining by 1993 were Nitella and P. cheesemanii. It was claimed in 1889 that growth was too lush to allow a canoe to be paddled through parts of the lake.

By 1921 the lake was said to be infested with weeds and by 1958 the original vegetation was almost completely replaced by Egeria densa, first seen in the Waikato in 1946. Elodea Canadensis and Indian doab (Myriophyllum triphyllum) were also identified. In 1977–1979, the Wildlife Service found the same plants, but also the introduced Potamogeton crispus, the native Myriophyllum propinquum and rediscovered blunt pondweed.

In 1987 the macrophyte beds declined to about 10% of the lake area, turbidity increased (possibly due to coal mine waste) and they were dominated by hornwort, another invasive exotic. High levels of suspended sediment and phytoplankton biomass, largely shade out re-establishment of submerged macrophytes.

=== Fish and other water life ===
Despite the pollution, 14 fish species live in the lake, with large populations of native fish, including short-finned eel (making up the most biomass), Galaxias maculatus, longfin eel, common bully and grey mullet, as well as pest fish - koi carp (next most biomass, introduced in 1872), mosquito fish, catfish and goldfish. Perhaps due to turbidity created by mining waste, or by koi carp, the native mysid shrimp is the common food of eels, smelt and common bully.

=== Riparian vegetation ===
Much of the lakeside vegetation grows in mineralised swamps. 48% of it consists of turf communities, categorised into 21 types, the longest being some 3.5 km (2.2 mi) of 'Indian doab–water purslane (Hydrocotyle hydrophila) herbfield'. The lake supports the largest known population of the indigenous sedge, Fimbristylis velata. Regionally important populations of Lobelia perpusilla and Carex gaudichaudiana are present. Dominant species were usually perennials, with the alien Mercer grass and the indigenous emergent spike sedge most common.

In 1871 vegetation was dominated by raupō, flax, sedge, kahikatea, lancewood and shrubs such as Raukaua anomalus and swamp māhoe (Melicytus micranthus), which remain west of the lake.

Raupo remained on much of the lake’s margin until the 1950s, but by 1991 only 9% remained in a narrow fringe. As early as the 1890s willows were mentioned as a problem and in 1917 the river board was clearing the stream of willow. Now the shores have been colonised by crack and grey willow and floating sudds of American primrose willow and Amazonian parrots feather (Ludwigia peploides and Myriophyllum aquaticum) are now along most of the lake shore. However, a 1991 survey found 541 vascular species of which 300 were indigenous (and another 13 now apparently extinct there). Endangered or uncommon turf plants include Amphibromus fluitans, Fimbristylis velata, Carex cirrhosa, C. gaudichaudiana, Lachnagrostis striata, Pratia perpusilla, pillwort and mud buttercup (Ranunculus limosella). Threats perceived by DOC were encroachment of the weeds Paspalum distichum, Centipeda cunninghamii, Myriophyllum aquaticum, and Ludwigia palustris, and the effects of cattle grazing.

The Awaroa Reserve is mainly formed of crack willow forest, with some open swamp of flax, cabbage tree, mānuka, and mingimingi. It also has 32 ha (79 acres) of regularly flooded kahikatea forest, with kōwhai, tōtara, mataī, pukatea and climbers, including Supplejack, swamp lawyer, bush lawyer, jasmine and pōuwhiwhi (Calystegia tuguriorum) and haaka (Viola lyalli) ground cover.

=== Birds ===
56 species have been recorded on and around the lake, the commonest being black swan, Canada goose, paradise duck, grey duck (pārera were common in 1905), mallard, shoveler and pūkeko. Other birds include shag, bittern, heron, crake, pied stilt, gulls, fernbird and grebe.

Since colonisation some birds have been introduced and others have become locally extinct. A pair of mute swans, presented by Sir George Grey to Captain Hutton, hatched their second brood in 1870, were donated to the Auckland Acclimatisation Society in 1871, by 1873 were a larger flock and, by 1878, there were enough to send some elsewhere. The Society added geese to the lake in 1905. Karakahia, or Australian white-eyed duck once bred on the lake and were reported in 1868.

== Restoration ==
Although the lake is identified as a priority 1 waterbody for stock exclusion in the Waikato Regional Plan, only about a third has been fenced to exclude cattle. A restoration project has fenced 4.5 km (2.8 mi) of the south shore and planted it with over 20,000 trees. In 2017 Government contributed $900,643, as part of a $2.8m scheme, towards that and accelerated alligator weed containment, which has been sprayed since 2002. Spraying of alligator weed and yellow flag iris was done again in 2014.

== Drainage proposals ==
Various proposals were made to drain the lake from 1892. Some drainage was done in 1917, when the Rotongaro Canal was cut. In 1956 the local MP, Hallyburton Johnstone, suggested the lake could be turned into farmland "at no great cost", a claim probably based on a 1933 estimate and a 1911 engineers' survey. In 1937 Raglan County Council raised a loan for extensive drainage of the lake.

== Boat ramps ==
There are boat ramps at Whangape Domain and Shuggs Landing. There is also road access to the lake edge at Beverland Rd. To prevent the spread of alligator weed, which was first found at the lake in 2003, boats need to be cleaned before and after using the lake. The Domain ramp is hard to access and Waikato District Council wasn't aware that it owned it.
