= Te Kohanga =

- Location within North Island
- Country: New Zealand
- Region: Waikato
- District: Waikato
- Wards: Western Districts Ward; Tai Raro Takiwaa Maaori Ward
- Community: Rural-Port Waikato Community
- Electorates: Port Waikato; Hauraki-Waikato (Māori)

Government
  - Territorial Authority: Waikato District Council
  - Regional council: Waikato Regional Council
  - Mayor of Waikato: Aksel Bech
  - Port Waikato MP: Andrew Bayly
  - Hauraki-Waikato MP: Hana-Rawhiti Maipi-Clarke

Area
  - Total: 12.34 km^{2} (4.76 sq mi)

Population (2023 census)
  - Total: 237
  - Density: 19.2/km^{2} (49.7/sq mi)

Te Kohanga (Māori: Te Kōhanga) is a village and rural community in the Waikato District and Waikato region of New Zealand's North Island.

The New Zealand Ministry for Culture and Heritage gives a translation of "the nest" for Te Kōhanga.

== Demographics ==
Te Kohanga is in two SA1 statistical areas which cover 12.34 km^{2} (4.76 sq mi). The SA1 areas are part of the larger Onewhero statistical area.

Historical population for Te Kohanga and surrounds
| Year | Pop. | ±% p.a. |
|---|---|---|
| 2013 | 204 | — |
| 2018 | 219 | +1.43% |
| 2023 | 237 | +1.59% |

The SA1 areas had a population of 237 in the 2023 New Zealand census, an increase of 18 people (8.2%) since the 2018 census, and an increase of 33 people (16.2%) since the 2013 census. There were 117 males and 117 females in 72 dwellings. 2.5% of people identified as LGBTIQ+. There were 45 people (19.0%) aged under 15 years, 36 (15.2%) aged 15 to 29, 111 (46.8%) aged 30 to 64, and 45 (19.0%) aged 65 or older.

People could identify as more than one ethnicity. The results were 64.6% European (Pākehā), 46.8% Māori, 5.1% Pasifika, 5.1% Asian, and 2.5% other, which includes people giving their ethnicity as "New Zealander". English was spoken by 96.2%, Māori language by 19.0%, and other languages by 5.1%. No language could be spoken by 2.5% (e.g. too young to talk). The percentage of people born overseas was 13.9, compared with 28.8% nationally.

Religious affiliations were 34.2% Christian, 2.5% Hindu, and 5.1% Māori religious beliefs. People who answered that they had no religion were 54.4%, and 5.1% of people did not answer the census question.

Of those at least 15 years old, 30 (15.6%) people had a bachelor's or higher degree, 99 (51.6%) had a post-high school certificate or diploma, and 57 (29.7%) people exclusively held high school qualifications. 15 people (7.8%) earned over $100,000 compared to 12.1% nationally. The employment status of those at least 15 was that 108 (56.2%) people were employed full-time, 12 (6.2%) were part-time, and 3 (1.6%) were unemployed.

== Marae ==
The community has two marae with Waikato Tainui hapū. Tikirahi Marae is affiliated with the hapū of Ngāti Tiipa. Te Kotahitanga Marae is associated with the hapū of Ngāti Āmaru, Ngāti Apakura and Ngāti Tiipa.

== Education ==
Te Kohanga School is a coeducational primary (years 1–6) school with a roll of 22 students as of July 2026. The school celebrated its centenary in 2013.
