= Glen Murray, New Zealand =

Locality in Waikato District, Waikato Region, New Zealand

Glen Murray
- Interactive map of Glen Murray
- Coordinates: 37.447836°S 174.958294°E
- Country: New Zealand
- Region: Waikato
- District: Waikato District
- Wards: Western Districts General Ward; Tai Raro Takiwaa Maaori Ward
- Community: Rural Port Waikato Community
- Electorates: Port Waikato; Hauraki-Waikato (Māori)

Government
  - Territorial Authority: Waikato District Council
  - Regional council: Waikato Regional Council
  - Mayor of Waikato: Aksel Bech
  - Port Waikato MP: Andrew Bayly
  - Hauraki-Waikato MP: Hana-Rawhiti Maipi-Clarke

Area
  - Total: 110.03 km^{2} (42.48 sq mi)

Population (2023 Census)
  - Total: 240
  - Density: 2.2/km^{2} (5.6/sq mi)

Glen Murray is a rural community in the Waikato District and Waikato region of New Zealand's North Island, on Highway 22, about 6 km (3.7 mi) up the Tikotiko Stream from Lake Whangape. It has a garage and a War Memorial Hall, which opened in 1952. It is named after William Murray, who moved from Piako in 1885.

Te Poho o Tanikena Marae is the meeting place of the local Waikato Tainui hapū of Ngāti Tāhinga, Ngāti Taratikitiki and Tainui Hapū. It includes a meeting house of the same name.

== History ==
Glen Murray was settled by Ngāti Tipa. In 1864 the area was described as inaccessible to the British troops in the Invasion of the Waikato, due to the swamps and bush.

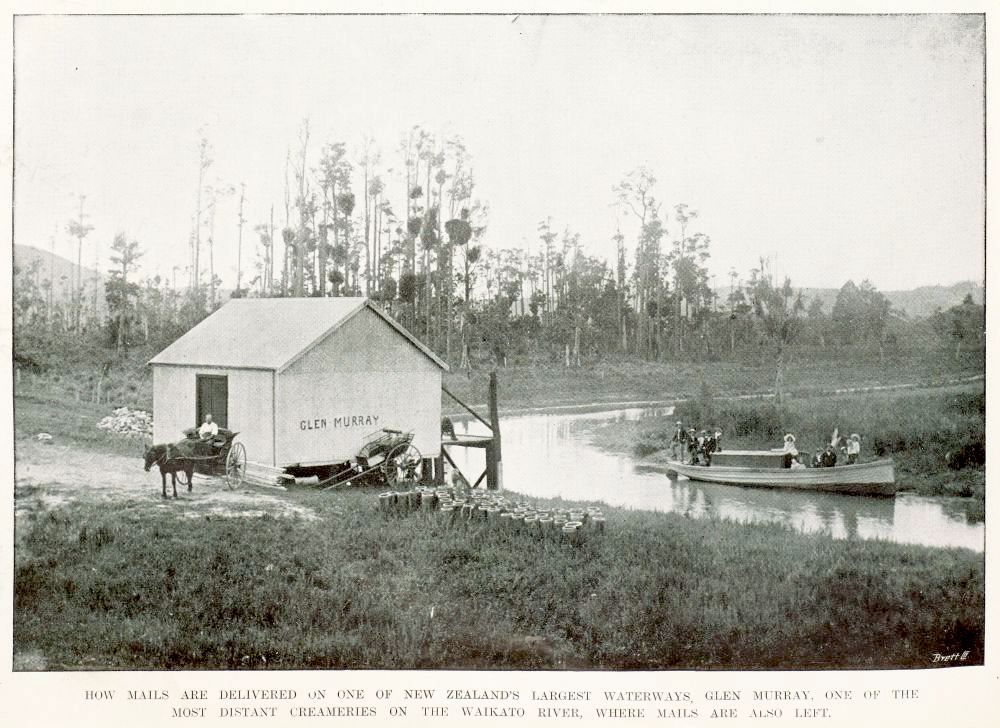
Glen Murray landing, on Opuatia Stream, to the north of the village

However, by 1866 it was in the confiscated area. By 1868 large parcels of land had been surveyed. As part of a policy of opening up land for settlement under the deferred payment scheme, the Government built bridleways from the Waikato River, to give access to two 20,000 acres (8,100 ha) blocks. The northernmost of the 2 routes began at Churchill, a settlement which then stood on the west bank of the river about 4 mi (6.4 km) west of Rangiriri. By 1881, 10 mi (16 km) had been opened as far as Glen Murray, through heavy swamp at the Churchill end. By 1883 a through track from the Waikato River to the West Coast was in existence.

In 1881 a road was constructed from Churchill west to Glen Murray, and in 1882 a road south from Glen Murray towards Naike was surveyed. In 1893 a post office opened, with a telephone from 1905.

Whangape Lake and neighbouring streams were used for transport, a Whangape Launch Company being set up in 1906 to convey goods from Rangiriri. Earlier, in 1894, Parliament had been asked to "have obstructions in the shape of eel weirs removed from the navigable creeks flowing from Whangape Lake into the Waikato River, to enable steamers now running on the Waikato River to carry goods for settlers in that district." In 1889 the weir had been partly removed to allow a boat to get through.

Bothwell Sawmill was selling totara, rimu, kahikatea and mataī in 1912.

=== School ===
In 1893 a temporary school opened. By April 1896 a schoolhouse was nearing completion. It closed in February 2002.

== Demographics ==
Glen Murray covers 110.03 km^{2} (42.48 sq mi). It is part of the larger Onewhero statistical area.

Historical population
Year	Pop.	±% p.a.
2006	192	—
2013	201	+0.66%
2018	228	+2.55%
2023	240	+1.03%

Glen Murray had a population of 240 in the 2023 New Zealand census, an increase of 12 people (5.3%) since the 2018 census, and an increase of 39 people (19.4%) since the 2013 census. There were 135 males and 108 females in 84 dwellings. 1.2% of people identified as LGBTIQ+. There were 60 people (25.0%) aged under 15 years, 36 (15.0%) aged 15 to 29, 105 (43.8%) aged 30 to 64, and 33 (13.8%) aged 65 or older.

People could identify as more than one ethnicity. The results were 93.8% European (Pākehā), 18.8% Māori, 6.2% Pasifika, 1.2% Asian, and 10.0% other, which includes people giving their ethnicity as "New Zealander". English was spoken by 100.0%, Māori language by 2.5%, and other languages by 7.5%. No language could be spoken by 1.2% (e.g. too young to talk). The percentage of people born overseas was 12.5, compared with 28.8% nationally.

Religious affiliations were 23.8% Christian, 1.2% Māori religious beliefs, 1.2% Buddhist, and 1.2% other religions. People who answered that they had no religion were 62.5%, and 11.2% of people did not answer the census question.

Of those at least 15 years old, 24 (13.3%) people had a bachelor's or higher degree, 105 (58.3%) had a post-high school certificate or diploma, and 42 (23.3%) people exclusively held high school qualifications. 12 people (6.7%) earned over $100,000 compared to 12.1% nationally. The employment status of those at least 15 was that 105 (58.3%) people were employed full-time, 24 (13.3%) were part-time, and 3 (1.7%) were unemployed.
