= Oruanui =

Rural community in the Waikato Region, New Zealand

- Locality
- Interactive map of Oruanui
- Coordinates: 38.572°S 176.030°E
- Country: New Zealand
- Region: Waikato region
- District: Taupō District
- Ward: Mangakino-Pouakani General Ward; Taupō East Rural General Ward
- Electorates: Taupō; Waiariki (Māori)

Government
  - Territorial Authority: Taupō District Council
  - Regional council: Waikato Regional Council
  - Mayor of Taupō: John Funnell
  - Taupō MP: Louise Upston
  - Waiariki MP: Rawiri Waititi

Area
  - Total: 18.59 km^{2} (7.18 sq mi)

Population (2023)
  - Total: 402
  - Density: 21.6/km^{2} (56.0/sq mi)

Oruanui (Māori: Ōruanui) is a rural community in the Taupō District and Waikato region of New Zealand's North Island, located northwest of Wairakei on State Highway 1.

The New Zealand Ministry for Culture and Heritage gives a translation of "place of many pits" for Ōruanui.

The local Ōruanui Marae is a meeting place of the Ngāti Tūwharetoa hapū of Ngāti Te Rangiita and Te Kapa o Te Rangiita. It includes the and Te Kapa o te Rangiita meeting house.

== Demographics ==
Oruanui locality covers 18.59 km^{2} (7.18 sq mi). It is part of the larger Ohakuri statistical area.

Historical population
Year	Pop.	±% p.a.
2006	333	—
2013	330	−0.13%
2018	366	+2.09%
2023	402	+1.89%

Oruanui locality had a population of 402 in the 2023 New Zealand census, an increase of 36 people (9.8%) since the 2018 census, and an increase of 72 people (21.8%) since the 2013 census. There were 201 males and 198 females in 147 dwellings. 1.5% of people identified as LGBTIQ+. There were 63 people (15.7%) aged under 15 years, 60 (14.9%) aged 15 to 29, 207 (51.5%) aged 30 to 64, and 75 (18.7%) aged 65 or older.

People could identify as more than one ethnicity. The results were 89.6% European (Pākehā); 12.7% Māori; 3.0% Pasifika; 3.7% Asian; 0.7% Middle Eastern, Latin American and African New Zealanders (MELAA); and 4.5% other, which includes people giving their ethnicity as "New Zealander". English was spoken by 97.8%, Māori by 3.0%, and other languages by 8.2%. The percentage of people born overseas was 18.7, compared with 28.8% nationally.

Religious affiliations were 24.6% Christian, 1.5% Hindu, 0.7% Islam, 0.7% Māori religious beliefs, 0.7% Buddhist, and 1.5% other religions. People who answered that they had no religion were 64.2%, and 8.2% of people did not answer the census question.

Of those at least 15 years old, 42 (12.4%) people had a bachelor's or higher degree, 213 (62.8%) had a post-high school certificate or diploma, and 81 (23.9%) people exclusively held high school qualifications. 42 people (12.4%) earned over $100,000 compared to 12.1% nationally. The employment status of those at least 15 was 201 (59.3%) full-time, 48 (14.2%) part-time, and 9 (2.7%) unemployed.
