= Gordonton =

Town in Waikato, New Zealand

Gordonton Hukanui (Māori)
- Town
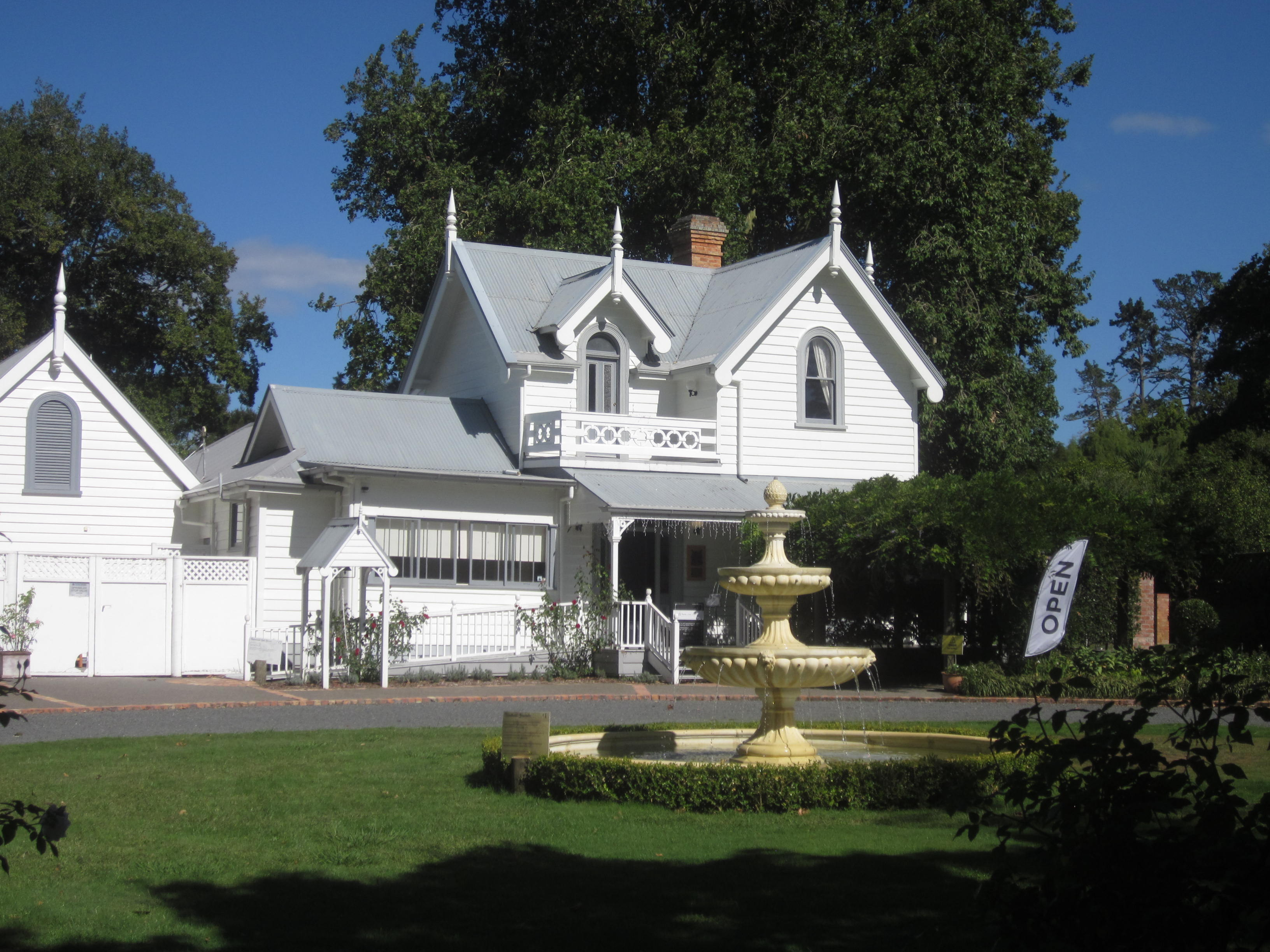
- Woodlands Estate homestead
- Interactive map of Gordonton
- Coordinates: 37.670°S 175.304°E
- Country: New Zealand
- Region: Waikato
- District: Waikato District
- Wards: Tamahere-Woodlands General Ward; Tai Runga Takiwaa Maaori Ward
- Electorates: Waikato; Hauraki-Waikato (Māori)

Government
  - Territorial Authority: Waikato District Council
  - Regional council: Waikato Regional Council
  - Mayor of Waikato: Aksel Bech
  - Waikato MP: Tim van de Molen
  - Hauraki-Waikato MP: Hana-Rawhiti Maipi-Clarke

Area
  - Total: 32.82 km^{2} (12.67 sq mi)
- Elevation: 26 m (85 ft)

Population (2023 Census)
  - Total: 729
  - Density: 22.2/km^{2} (57.5/sq mi)
- Time zone: UTC+12 (NZST)
  - Summer (DST): UTC+13 (NZDT)

Gordonton (Māori: Hukanui) is a village and rural community in the Waikato District and Waikato region of New Zealand's North Island. It is located southeast of Taupiri on State Highway 1B.

The area was initially called Hukanui, which means "heavy frost" in the Māori language. It was renamed to Gordonton after John Gordon, who was a manager for the New Zealand Land Association in the Waikato from 1886.

The local Hukanui Marae is a meeting place of the local Waikato Tainui hapū of Ngāti Makirangi and Ngāti Wairere. It includes Te Tuturu-a-Papa Kamutu meeting house.

== Demographics ==
Gordonton village and its surrounds cover 32.82 km^{2} (12.67 sq mi). It is part of the larger Kainui-Gordonton statistical area.

Historical population for Gordonton and surrounds
Year	Pop.	±% p.a.
2006	663	—
2013	717	+1.12%
2018	738	+0.58%
2023	729	−0.25%

Gordonton had a population of 729 in the 2023 New Zealand census, a decrease of 9 people (−1.2%) since the 2018 census, and an increase of 12 people (1.7%) since the 2013 census. There were 345 males, 381 females and 3 people of other genders in 204 dwellings. 2.1% of people identified as LGBTIQ+. There were 180 people (24.7%) aged under 15 years, 126 (17.3%) aged 15 to 29, 333 (45.7%) aged 30 to 64, and 90 (12.3%) aged 65 or older.

People could identify as more than one ethnicity. The results were 75.3% European (Pākehā); 21.4% Māori; 2.1% Pasifika; 11.1% Asian; 0.8% Middle Eastern, Latin American and African New Zealanders (MELAA); and 2.5% other, which includes people giving their ethnicity as "New Zealander". English was spoken by 95.1%, Māori language by 9.5%, Samoan by 0.4%, and other languages by 14.4%. No language could be spoken by 2.5% (e.g. too young to talk). New Zealand Sign Language was known by 0.4%. The percentage of people born overseas was 21.0, compared with 28.8% nationally.

Religious affiliations were 43.6% Christian, 0.4% Hindu, 0.8% Māori religious beliefs, 0.4% Buddhist, and 4.1% other religions. People who answered that they had no religion were 45.7%, and 6.2% of people did not answer the census question.

Of those at least 15 years old, 144 (26.2%) people had a bachelor's or higher degree, 279 (50.8%) had a post-high school certificate or diploma, and 111 (20.2%) people exclusively held high school qualifications. 78 people (14.2%) earned over $100,000 compared to 12.1% nationally. The employment status of those at least 15 was that 273 (49.7%) people were employed full-time, 87 (15.8%) were part-time, and 12 (2.2%) were unemployed.

=== Kainui-Gordonton statistical area ===
Kainui-Gordonton statistical area covers 88.43 km^{2} (34.14 sq mi) and had an estimated population of 1,880 as of June 2025, with a population density of 21 people per km^{2}.

Historical population for the statistical area
Year	Pop.	±% p.a.
2006	1,497	—
2013	1,629	+1.21%
2018	1,734	+1.26%
2023	1,818	+0.95%

Kainui-Gordonton had a population of 1,818 in the 2023 New Zealand census, an increase of 84 people (4.8%) since the 2018 census, and an increase of 189 people (11.6%) since the 2013 census. There were 903 males, 912 females and 6 people of other genders in 564 dwellings. 2.0% of people identified as LGBTIQ+. The median age was 37.7 years (compared with 38.1 years nationally). There were 441 people (24.3%) aged under 15 years, 297 (16.3%) aged 15 to 29, 861 (47.4%) aged 30 to 64, and 222 (12.2%) aged 65 or older.

People could identify as more than one ethnicity. The results were 83.2% European (Pākehā); 15.8% Māori; 2.3% Pasifika; 8.4% Asian; 1.2% Middle Eastern, Latin American and African New Zealanders (MELAA); and 3.6% other, which includes people giving their ethnicity as "New Zealander". English was spoken by 96.2%, Māori language by 4.6%, Samoan by 0.2%, and other languages by 11.7%. No language could be spoken by 2.1% (e.g. too young to talk). New Zealand Sign Language was known by 0.5%. The percentage of people born overseas was 16.8, compared with 28.8% nationally.

Religious affiliations were 39.8% Christian, 0.3% Hindu, 0.3% Māori religious beliefs, 0.5% Buddhist, 0.2% New Age, and 3.3% other religions. People who answered that they had no religion were 49.0%, and 6.6% of people did not answer the census question.

Of those at least 15 years old, 354 (25.7%) people had a bachelor's or higher degree, 762 (55.3%) had a post-high school certificate or diploma, and 270 (19.6%) people exclusively held high school qualifications. The median income was $52,200, compared with $41,500 nationally. 246 people (17.9%) earned over $100,000 compared to 12.1% nationally. The employment status of those at least 15 was that 753 (54.7%) people were employed full-time, 246 (17.9%) were part-time, and 21 (1.5%) were unemployed.

== Education ==
Gordonton School is a co-educational state primary school covering years 1 to 8, with a roll of 243 as of July 2026.

Gordonton School opened in 1893 as Hukanui School. In 1913 it was renamed Gordonton School and in 1961 the school moved to a new site. The former teacher's residence and former school building each have a category 2 registration with Heritage New Zealand. The former school building was designed by Mitchell and Watt and the teacher's residence was designed by John Farrell.

Eastwest College of Intercultural Studies is a Category 1 Private Training Establishment established on the western side of Gordonton in 1996 by WEC Aotearoa New Zealand. It is a Christian tertiary institute that offers both NZQA Level 5 and Level 6 diplomas in intercultural studies. WEC Aotearoa New Zealand headquarters is located next door.

== Woodlands Estate ==
Woodlands is a homestead and Garden of National Significance, established in the 1870s. The gardens occupy eight hectares and are open to the public.
