= Waihāhā =

- Rural locality
- Interactive map of Waihāhā
- Coordinates: 38.724°S 175.746°E
- Country: New Zealand
- Region: Waikato region
- District: Taupō District
- Ward: Mangakino-Pouakani General Ward
- Electorates: Taupō; Te Tai Hauāuru (Māori)

Government
  - Territorial Authority: Taupō District Council
  - Regional council: Waikato Regional Council
  - Mayor of Taupō: John Funnell
  - Taupō MP: Louise Upston
  - Hauraki-Waikato MP: Hana-Rawhiti Maipi-Clarke

Area
  - Total: 252.61 km^{2} (97.53 sq mi)

Population (2023)
  - Total: 84
  - Density: 0.33/km^{2} (0.86/sq mi)
- Postcode(s): 3381

Waihāhā is a village and rural community in the Taupō District and Waikato region of New Zealand's North Island.

The New Zealand Ministry for Culture and Heritage gives a translation of "noisy water" for Waihāhā.

== Demographics ==
Waihāhā locality covers 252.61 km^{2} (97.53 sq mi). It is part of the Lake Taupo Bays statistical area.

Historical population
Year	Pop.	±% p.a.
2006	96	—
2013	60	−6.49%
2018	63	+0.98%
2023	84	+5.92%
The 2006 population is for a larger area of 264.07 km^{2}. Source:

Waihāhā locality had a population of 84 in the 2023 New Zealand census, an increase of 21 people (33.3%) since the 2018 census, and an increase of 24 people (40.0%) since the 2013 census. There were 48 males and 39 females in 30 dwellings. The median age was 34.6 years (compared with 38.1 years nationally). There were 21 people (25.0%) aged under 15 years, 12 (14.3%) aged 15 to 29, 42 (50.0%) aged 30 to 64, and 9 (10.7%) aged 65 or older.

People could identify as more than one ethnicity. The results were 78.6% European (Pākehā); 39.3% Māori; 3.6% Pasifika; and 3.6% Middle Eastern, Latin American and African New Zealanders (MELAA). English was spoken by 96.4%, Māori by 17.9%, and other languages by 3.6%. No language could be spoken by 3.6% (e.g. too young to talk). The percentage of people born overseas was 3.6, compared with 28.8% nationally.

Religious affiliations were 21.4% Christian, and 3.6% Māori religious beliefs. People who answered that they had no religion were 60.7%, and 14.3% of people did not answer the census question.

Of those at least 15 years old, 9 (14.3%) people had a bachelor's or higher degree, 42 (66.7%) had a post-high school certificate or diploma, and 12 (19.0%) people exclusively held high school qualifications. The median income was $52,200, compared with $41,500 nationally. 9 people (14.3%) earned over $100,000 compared to 12.1% nationally. The employment status of those at least 15 was 33 (52.4%) full-time and 15 (23.8%) part-time.

== Marae ==
The suburb has two marae:

- Waihāhā Marae and Haukapuanui meeting house is a meeting place of the Ngāti Tūwharetoa hapū of Ngāti Hā, Ngāti Tarakaiahi and Ngāti Wheoro, and the Ngāti Raukawa hapū of Ngāti Hā.
- Waimiha Marae and Te Ihingarangi meeting house is a meeting place of the Rereahu hapū of Ngāti Hinewhatihua, Ngāti Kahuiao, Ngāti Turakiwai and Te Ihingarangi.
