= Parawera =

Village rural community in the Waipa District of New Zealand

Coordinates: 38.074090°S 175.428081°E

Parawera or Pārāwera is a village rural community in the Waipa District and Waikato region of New Zealand's North Island. It is located south-east of Te Awamutu and Kihikihi, and east of State Highway 3. It was a Māori settlement during the 19th century.

== Marae ==
Parawera has two marae:

- The main village is centred around Pārāwera Marae and Tāne-i-rangi-kapua meeting house, a tribal meeting place of the Ngāti Raukawa hapū of Ngāti Ruru, Waenganui and Werokoko, and the Waikato Tainui hapū of Ngāti Ruru and Ngāti Werokoko.
- The nearby Ōwairaka Rāwhitiroa Marae and Takihiku meeting house is a meeting place for the Ngāti Raukawa hapū of Ngāti Kiri, Ngāti Takihiku, Ngāti Whakatere and Rereahu, and the Waikato Tainui hapū of Ngāti Korokī and Ngāti Raukawa ki Panehākua.

In October 2020, the Government committed $1,259,392 from the Provincial Growth Fund to upgrade Pārāwera Marae and Ōwairaka Rāwhitiroa Marae, creating 18 jobs.
