= Hauturu, Waikato =

Hauturu
- Locality
- Interactive map of Hauturu
- Coordinates: 38.104°S 174.930°E
- Country: New Zealand
- Region: Waikato Region
- District: Ōtorohanga District
- Ward: Kāwhia-Tihiroa General Ward
- Electorates: Taranaki-King Country; Te Tai Hauāuru (Māori)

Government
  - Territorial Authority: Ōtorohanga District Council
  - Regional council: Waikato Regional Council
  - Mayor of Ōtorohanga: Rodney Dow
  - Taranaki-King Country MP: Barbara Kuriger
  - Te Tai Hauāuru MP: Debbie Ngarewa-Packer

Area
  - Territorial: 237.00 km^{2} (91.51 sq mi)

Population (2023 Census)
  - Territorial: 156
  - Density: 0.658/km^{2} (1.70/sq mi)
- Time zone: UTC+12 (NZST)
  - Summer (DST): UTC+13 (NZDT)

Hauturu is a locality near the eastern shores of the Kawhia Harbour, in the Ōtorohanga District and Waikato region of New Zealand's North Island.

== Demographics ==
Hauturu locality covers 237.00 km^{2} (91.51 sq mi). It is part of the larger Pirongia Forest statistical area.

Historical population
Year	Pop.	±% p.a.
2006	135	—
2013	150	+1.52%
2018	162	+1.55%
2023	156	−0.75%

Hauturu had a population of 156 in the 2023 New Zealand census, a decrease of 6 people (−3.7%) since the 2018 census, and an increase of 6 people (4.0%) since the 2013 census. There were 78 males and 78 females in 66 dwellings. 3.8% of people identified as LGBTIQ+. The median age was 47.1 years (compared with 38.1 years nationally). There were 24 people (15.4%) aged under 15 years, 24 (15.4%) aged 15 to 29, 75 (48.1%) aged 30 to 64, and 33 (21.2%) aged 65 or older.

People could identify as more than one ethnicity. The results were 78.8% European (Pākehā), 34.6% Māori, 1.9% Pasifika, and 3.8% other, which includes people giving their ethnicity as "New Zealander". English was spoken by 98.1%, Māori by 5.8%, and other languages by 1.9%. The percentage of people born overseas was 11.5, compared with 28.8% nationally.

Religious affiliations were 23.1% Christian. People who answered that they had no religion were 65.4%, and 9.6% of people did not answer the census question.

Of those at least 15 years old, 15 (11.4%) people had a bachelor's or higher degree, 72 (54.5%) had a post-high school certificate or diploma, and 42 (31.8%) people exclusively held high school qualifications. The median income was $24,900, compared with $41,500 nationally. 9 people (6.8%) earned over $100,000 compared to 12.1% nationally. The employment status of those at least 15 was 63 (47.7%) full-time, 24 (18.2%) part-time, and 3 (2.3%) unemployed.

== Marae ==
The local Rākaunui Marae is a meeting ground for the Ngāti Maniapoto hapū of Kerapa, Takiari and Te Waha, and the Waikato Tainui hapū of Ngāti Ngutu and Ngāti Paretekawa. It includes the Moanakahakore meeting house.

== Education ==
Hauturu School is a Year 1–8 co-educational state primary school. It is a decile 3 school with a roll of 24 as of July 2026. It was founded in 1918, though Awaroa School got an Education Ministry grant from 1910. The school, which was also known as Awaroa School, was described as being made of packing cases before it was rebuilt in 1924.

== Te Koraha ==
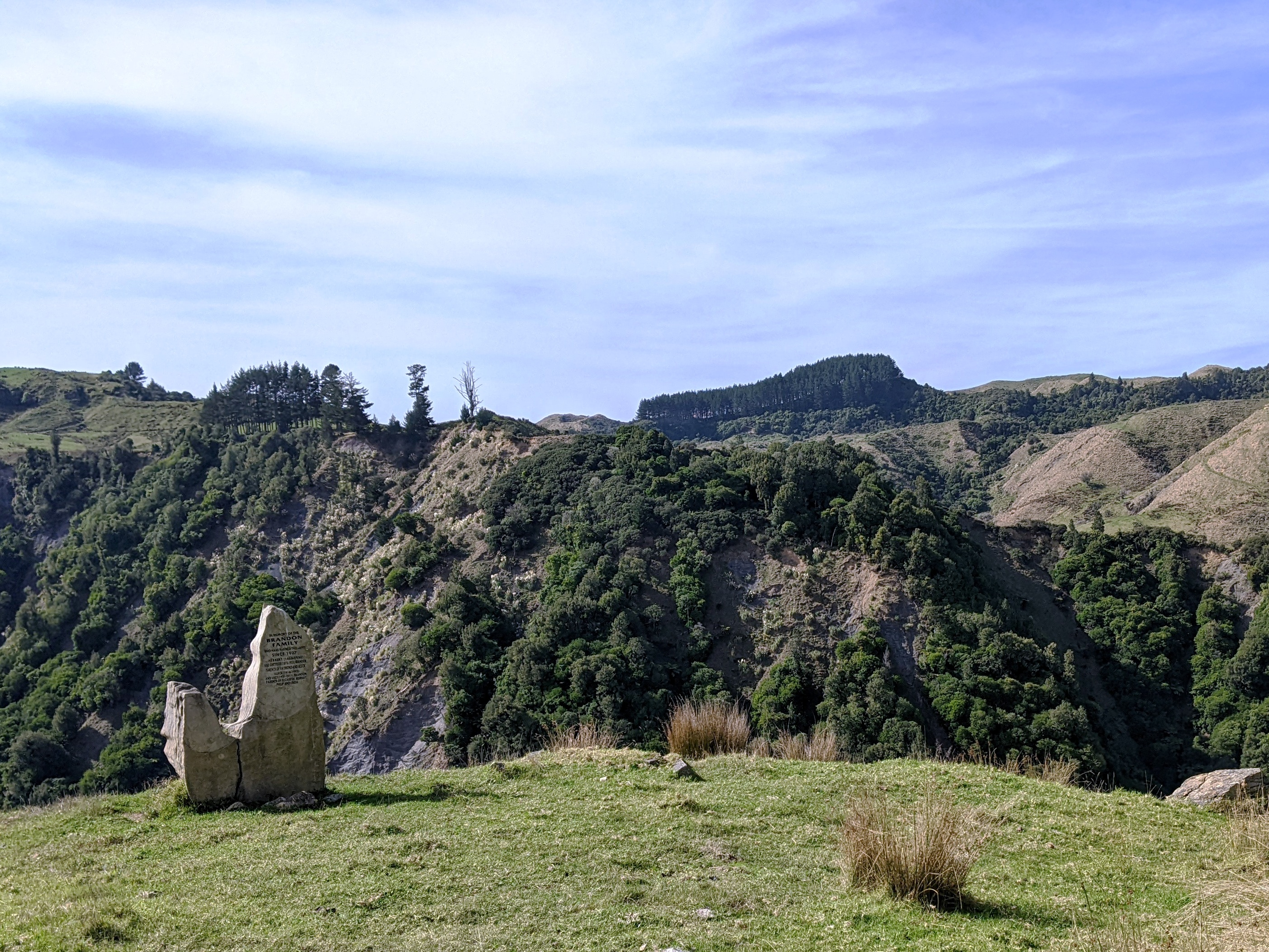
Memorial to the Brandon family of farmers near Te Koraha

A request to extend Hauturu Road up the Awaroa valley was made by the new settlers in 1905. Te Koraha School was open from at least 1911 to 1935. It was about 12 km (7.5 mi) up the Awaroa valley.
