= Waerenga =

- Locality
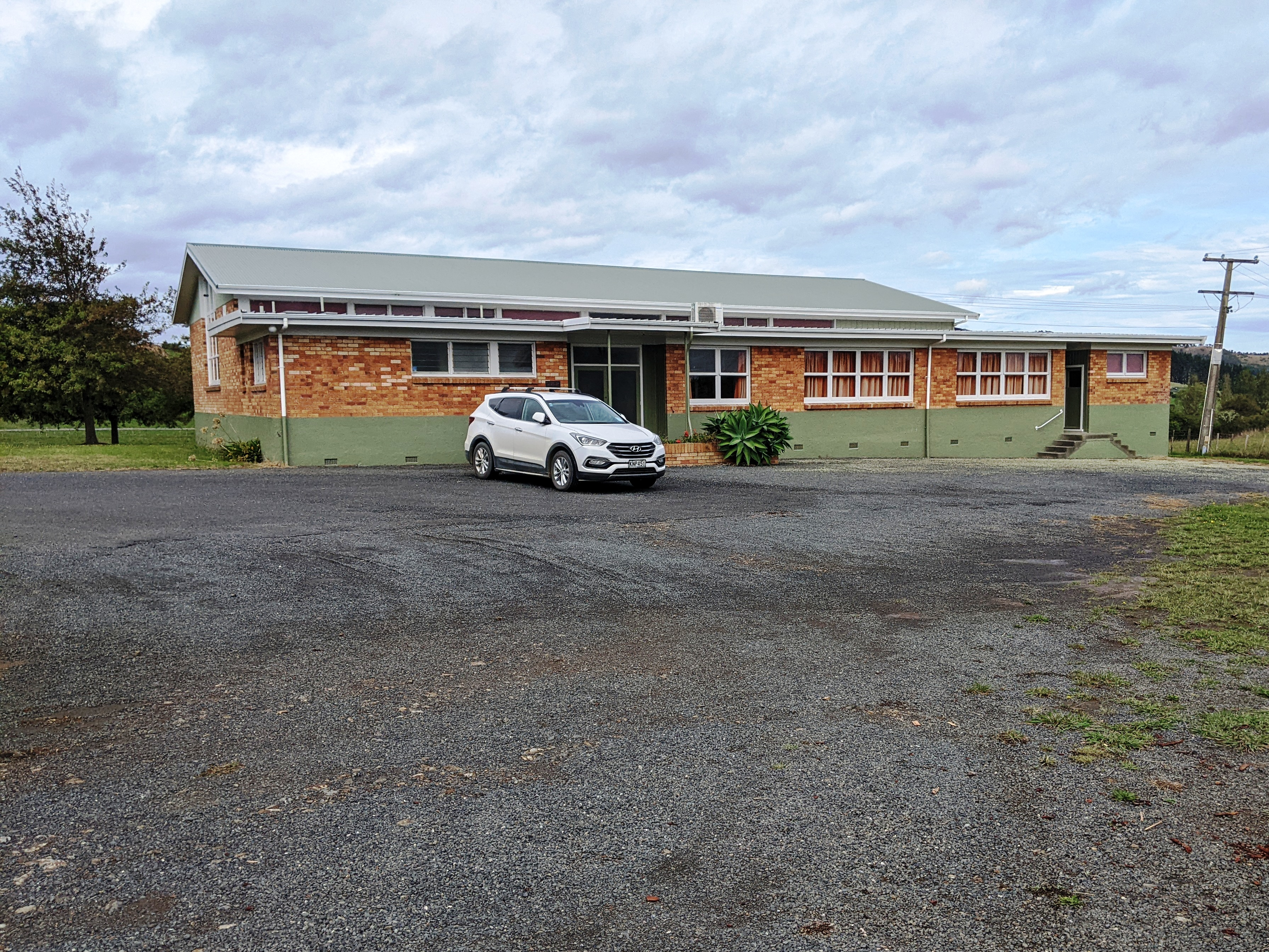
- Waerenga Hall
- Interactive map of Waerenga
- Coordinates: 37.368264°S 175.244932°E
- Country: New Zealand
- Region: Waikato
- District: Waikato District
- Wards: Waerenga-Whitikahu General Ward; Tai Raro Takiwaa Maaori Ward
- Electorates: Waikato; Hauraki-Waikato (Māori)

Government
  - Territorial Authority: Waikato District Council
  - Regional council: Waikato Regional Council
  - Mayor of Waikato: Aksel Bech
  - Waikato MP: Tim van de Molen
  - Hauraki-Waikato MP: Hana-Rawhiti Maipi-Clarke

Area
  - Total: 20.16 km^{2} (7.78 sq mi)

Population (2023 Census)
  - Total: 156
  - Density: 7.74/km^{2} (20.0/sq mi)
- Time zone: UTC+12 (NZST)
  - Summer (DST): UTC+13 (NZDT)
- Postcode: 3781
- Area code: 07

Waerenga is a locality in the Waikato, New Zealand.

The area is in the Hukanui Waerenga electoral ward of the Waikato District Council.

== Etymology ==
Waerenga is a Māori word meaning 'clearing in the bush'.

== History ==
Europeans settled the area in the late 1860s and established farms in the area, some of these settlers were from the Third Waikato Regiment. Some of the early settlers created a bridle track to Rangiriri and a track to Lake Waikare. The introduction of the railway line in the late 1870s saw an influx of settlers but the area was still farmland in 1880. By 1902 Waerenga had a creamery.

In 1926 construction of the Waerenga and Taniwha Undenominational War Memorial Church commenced and the church opened in December 1928. It has two rolls of honour for the residents of the area who served in the First and Second World Wars.

== Demographics ==
Waerenga locality covers 20.16 km^{2} (7.78 sq mi). It is part of the larger Waerenga statistical area.

Historical populations for the locality
Year	Pop.	±% p.a.
2006	174	—
2013	162	−1.02%
2018	156	−0.75%
2023	156	+0.00%

Waerenga had a population of 156 in the 2023 New Zealand census, unchanged since the 2018 census, and a decrease of 6 people (−3.7%) since the 2013 census. There were 75 males and 81 females in 66 dwellings. 1.9% of people identified as LGBTIQ+. The median age was 47.7 years (compared with 38.1 years nationally). There were 18 people (11.5%) aged under 15 years, 36 (23.1%) aged 15 to 29, 69 (44.2%) aged 30 to 64, and 30 (19.2%) aged 65 or older.

People could identify as more than one ethnicity. The results were 94.2% European (Pākehā), 13.5% Māori, 3.8% Pasifika, and 1.9% Asian. English was spoken by 98.1%, and other languages by 1.9%. No language could be spoken by 1.9% (e.g. too young to talk). The percentage of people born overseas was 13.5, compared with 28.8% nationally.

Religious affiliations were 34.6% Christian, and 1.9% New Age. People who answered that they had no religion were 57.7%, and 7.7% of people did not answer the census question.

Of those at least 15 years old, 21 (15.2%) people had a bachelor's or higher degree, 78 (56.5%) had a post-high school certificate or diploma, and 36 (26.1%) people exclusively held high school qualifications. The median income was $47,000, compared with $41,500 nationally. 18 people (13.0%) earned over $100,000 compared to 12.1% nationally. The employment status of those at least 15 was that 72 (52.2%) people were employed full-time, 21 (15.2%) were part-time, and 3 (2.2%) were unemployed.

=== Waerenga statistical area ===
The Waerenga statistical area covers 261.74 km^{2} (101.06 sq mi) and had an estimated population of 970 as of June 2025, with a population density of 3.7 people per km^{2}.

Historical population for the statistical area
Year	Pop.	±% p.a.
2006	879	—
2013	855	−0.39%
2018	915	+1.37%
2023	921	+0.13%

Waerenga statistical area had a population of 921 in the 2023 New Zealand census, an increase of 6 people (0.7%) since the 2018 census, and an increase of 66 people (7.7%) since the 2013 census. There were 465 males, 447 females and 6 people of other genders in 339 dwellings. 2.6% of people identified as LGBTIQ+. The median age was 45.6 years (compared with 38.1 years nationally). There were 150 people (16.3%) aged under 15 years, 147 (16.0%) aged 15 to 29, 480 (52.1%) aged 30 to 64, and 141 (15.3%) aged 65 or older.

People could identify as more than one ethnicity. The results were 89.9% European (Pākehā); 15.3% Māori; 2.9% Pasifika; 3.6% Asian; 0.3% Middle Eastern, Latin American and African New Zealanders (MELAA); and 2.0% other, which includes people giving their ethnicity as "New Zealander". English was spoken by 98.4%, Māori language by 2.3%, Samoan by 0.3%, and other languages by 4.9%. No language could be spoken by 1.3% (e.g. too young to talk). New Zealand Sign Language was known by 0.7%. The percentage of people born overseas was 15.3, compared with 28.8% nationally.

Religious affiliations were 29.3% Christian, 0.3% Hindu, 0.3% Islam, 1.0% New Age, and 1.0% other religions. People who answered that they had no religion were 60.3%, and 7.5% of people did not answer the census question.

Of those at least 15 years old, 138 (17.9%) people had a bachelor's or higher degree, 444 (57.6%) had a post-high school certificate or diploma, and 195 (25.3%) people exclusively held high school qualifications. The median income was $47,300, compared with $41,500 nationally. 81 people (10.5%) earned over $100,000 compared to 12.1% nationally. The employment status of those at least 15 was that 450 (58.4%) people were employed full-time, 135 (17.5%) were part-time, and 15 (1.9%) were unemployed.

== Marae ==
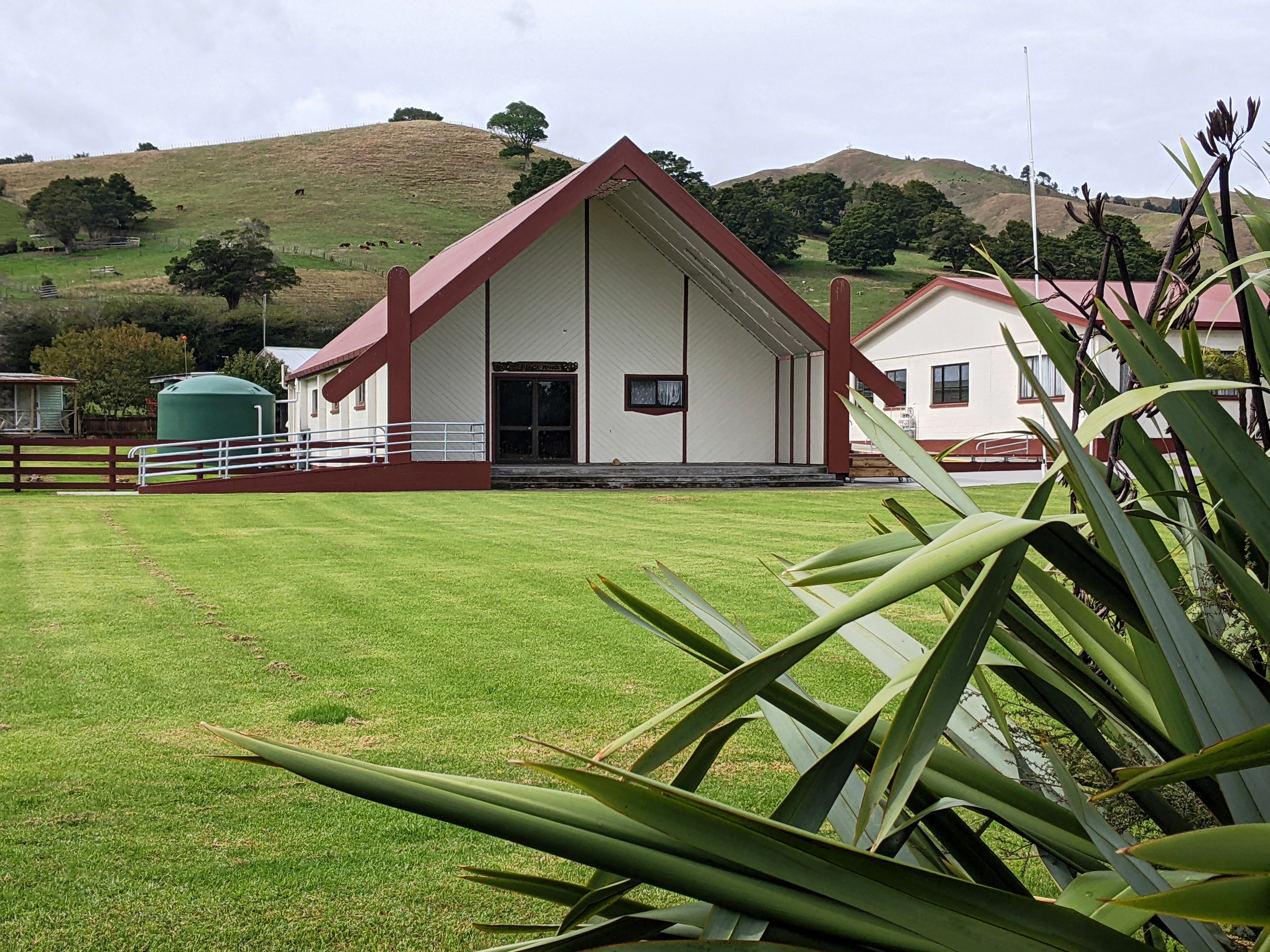
Taniwha Marae

Ngāti Hine, Ngāti Naho and Ngāti Pou are associated with marae in the area.

There are two marae in the area, affiliated with the Waikato Tainui hapū of Ngāti Tai, Ngāti Kuiaarangi, Ngāti Mahuta and Ngāti Whāwhākia: the Ōkarea Marae and Pokaiwhenua meeting house, and the Taniwha Marae and Me Whakatupu ki te Hua o te Rengarenga meeting house.

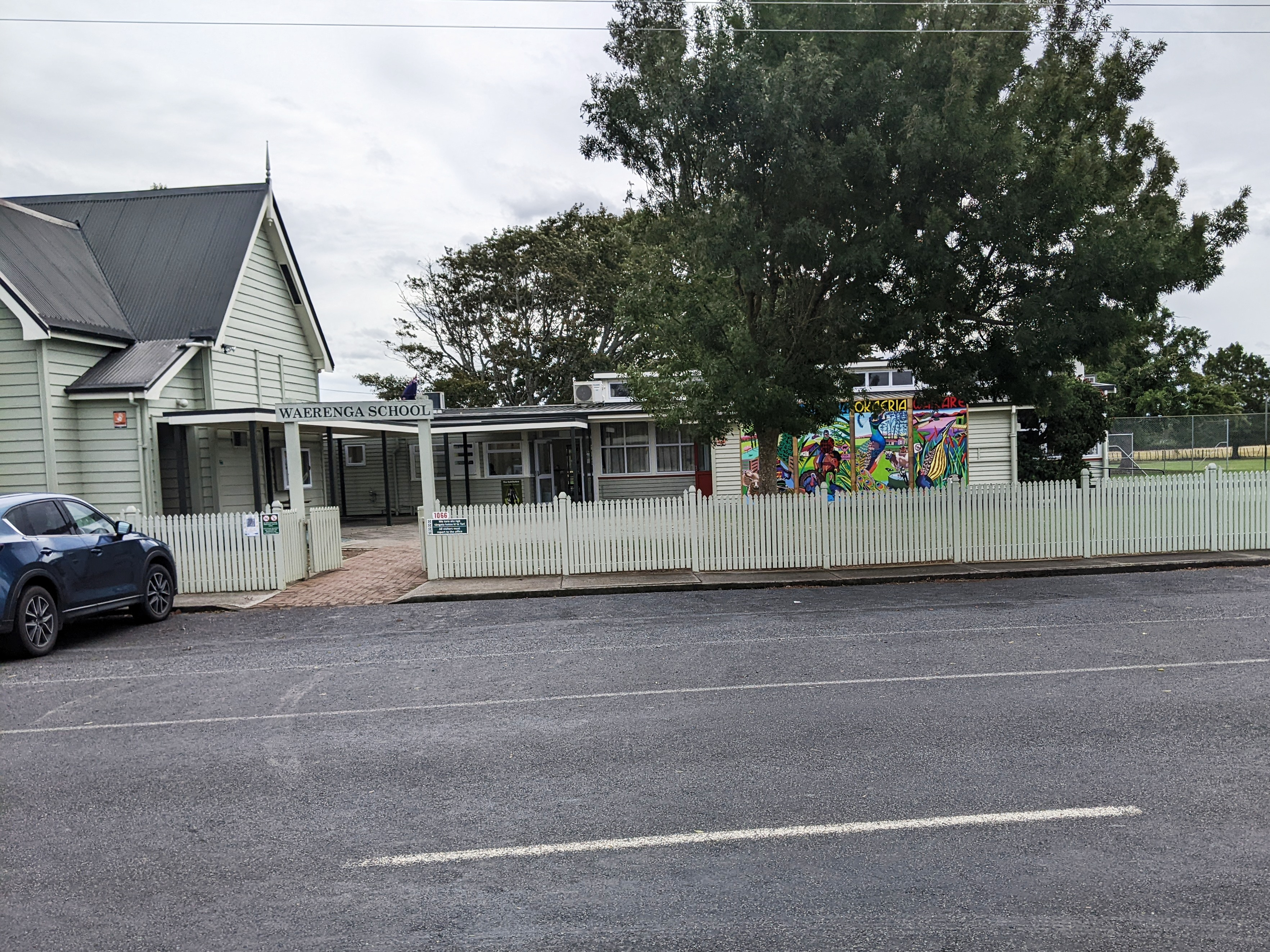
Waerenga School

In October 2020, the Government committed $2,584,751 from the Provincial Growth Fund to upgrade Taniwha Marae and 7 other Waikato Tainui marae, creating 40 jobs.

== Education ==
Waerenga School was established at a private home in 1881 and in 1882 a school house was constructed. The school was relocated in 1928. The original school house has served as a library since 1980. Waerenga School is a co-educational state primary school which is transitioning in 2025–2026 from a school for Year 1 to 6 students to one also including Years 7 and 8. It had a roll of 107 as of July 2026.
