= Ohakuri =

Rural locality in Waikato, New Zealand

- Rural locality
- Interactive map of Ohakuri
- Coordinates: 38.409°S 176.087°E
- Country: New Zealand
- Region: Waikato region
- District: Taupō District
- Ward: Mangakino-Pouakani General Ward
- Electorates: Taupō; Te Tai Hauāuru (Māori)

Government
  - Territorial Authority: Taupō District Council
  - Regional council: Waikato Regional Council
  - Mayor of Taupō: John Funnell
  - Taupō MP: Louise Upston
  - Hauraki-Waikato MP: Hana-Rawhiti Maipi-Clarke

Area
  - Total: 119.98 km^{2} (46.32 sq mi)

Population (2023)
  - Total: 39
  - Density: 0.33/km^{2} (0.84/sq mi)
- Postcode(s): 3078

Ohakuri is a rural community in the Taupō District and Waikato region of New Zealand's North Island. It features the Orakei Korako Geothermal Area, the artificial Lake Ohakuri and the Ohakuri Dam.

== Marae ==
The area also includes Maroanui Marae, a meeting place of the local Ngāti Tūwharetoa hapū of Ngāti Hinerau. It features a meeting house of the same name. The marae was renovated between 2008 and 2010, with a grant from the nearby Wairakei Power Station. The renovations included wheelchair ramps and accessible toilets for disabled members of the hapū.

== Demographics ==
=== Ohakuri statistical area ===
Ohakuri statistical area, which also includes Ātiamuri and Oruanui, covers 542.95 km^{2} (209.63 sq mi) and had an estimated population of 2,120 as of June 2025, with a population density of 3.9 people per km^{2}.

Historical population
Year	Pop.	±% p.a.
2006	1,434	—
2013	1,671	+2.21%
2018	1,842	+1.97%
2023	1,953	+1.18%

Ohakuri statistical area had a population of 1,953 in the 2023 New Zealand census, an increase of 111 people (6.0%) since the 2018 census, and an increase of 282 people (16.9%) since the 2013 census. There were 1,014 males, 936 females, and 6 people of other genders in 681 dwellings. 1.8% of people identified as LGBTIQ+. The median age was 38.7 years (compared with 38.1 years nationally). There were 402 people (20.6%) aged under 15 years, 342 (17.5%) aged 15 to 29, 960 (49.2%) aged 30 to 64, and 246 (12.6%) aged 65 or older.

People could identify as more than one ethnicity. The results were 82.3% European (Pākehā); 22.1% Māori; 2.3% Pasifika; 6.0% Asian; 0.8% Middle Eastern, Latin American and African New Zealanders (MELAA); and 2.5% other, which includes people giving their ethnicity as "New Zealander". English was spoken by 96.9%, Māori by 4.1%, Samoan by 0.3%, and other languages by 6.0%. No language could be spoken by 1.8% (e.g. too young to talk). New Zealand Sign Language was known by 0.5%. The percentage of people born overseas was 15.7, compared with 28.8% nationally.

Religious affiliations were 24.9% Christian, 0.2% Hindu, 0.3% Islam, 1.2% Māori religious beliefs, 0.5% Buddhist, 0.5% New Age, and 2.2% other religions. People who answered that they had no religion were 64.4%, and 6.1% of people did not answer the census question.

Of those at least 15 years old, 237 (15.3%) people had a bachelor's or higher degree, 954 (61.5%) had a post-high school certificate or diploma, and 360 (23.2%) people exclusively held high school qualifications. The median income was $47,100, compared with $41,500 nationally. 183 people (11.8%) earned over $100,000 compared to 12.1% nationally. The employment status of those at least 15 was 924 (59.6%) full-time, 246 (15.9%) part-time, and 30 (1.9%) unemployed.

=== Ohakuri proper ===
Ohakuri community is in meshblocks 1263500 and 1276201, which cover 119.98 km^{2} (46.32 sq mi) and had a population of 39 in the 2023 census.

== See also ==
- Ohakuri Caldera
