= Rangitoto, Waikato =

Rangitoto
- Rural community
- Interactive map of Rangitoto
- Coordinates: 38.345956°S 175.256417°E
- Country: New Zealand
- Region: Waikato
- Territorial authority: Waitomo District
- Ward: Rural
- Electorates: Taranaki-King Country; Te Tai Hauāuru (Māori)

Government
  - Territorial Authority: Waitomo District Council
  - Regional council: Waikato Regional Council
  - Mayor of Waitomo: John Robertson
  - Taranaki-King Country MP: Barbara Kuriger
  - Hauraki-Waikato MP: Hana-Rawhiti Maipi-Clarke

Population (2023)
  - Total: 162
- Postcode(s): 3982

Rangitoto is a rural community in the Waitomo District and Waikato region of New Zealand's North Island.

== Demographics ==
Rangitoto is in meshblocks 1020500 and 1020600, which had a population of 162 in the 2023 census. It is within the much larger Waipa Valley statistical area.

== Marae ==
The area includes Te Ahoroa Marae, a Ngāti Maniapoto tribal meeting ground of the Maniapoto hapū of Pare and Rereahu and the Rereahu hapū of Ngāti Paretapoko. It includes the Tapairu meeting house.

In October 2020, the Government committed $499,848 from the Provincial Growth Fund to upgrade the marae, creating an estimated 10 jobs.

== Education ==
Rangitoto School is a co-educational state primary school, with a roll of 22 as of July 2026. The school opened in 1920.
