= Ngāti Paretekawa =

- Iwi (tribe) in Māoridom
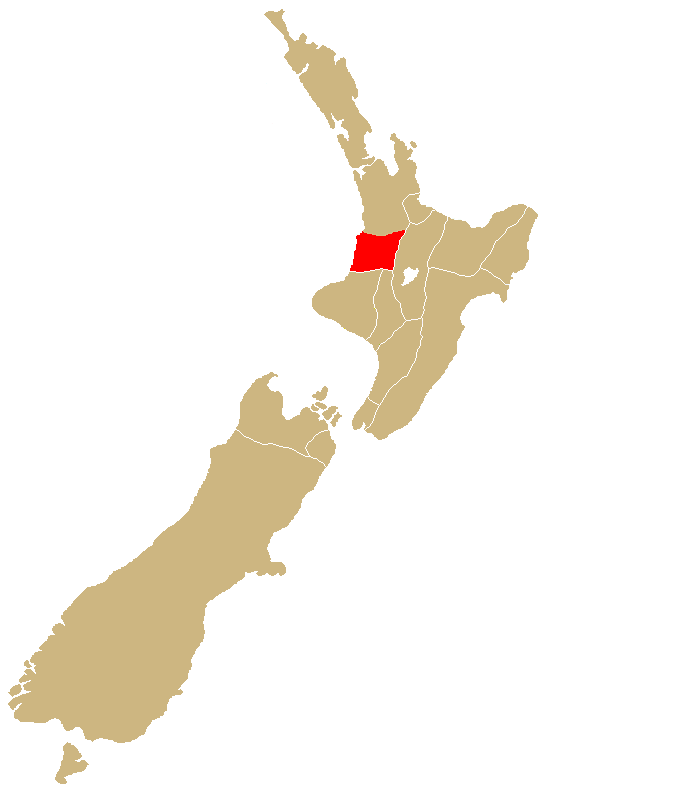
- Rohe (region): King Country
- Waka (canoe): Tainui

Ngāti Paretekawa (Paretekawa) are a very numerous hapū (sub-tribe, or clan) of the Ngāti Maniapoto confederation in New Zealand, whose ancestral tribal lands are located in both the northern King Country, including the areas around the Kakepuku, Pirongia, in the vicinity of Te Awamutu, Kihikihi, Pokuru, Kakepuku, and Kawhia, with sub-hapū interests in the southern King Country area of the Mokau and Kawhia, at the foothills of Kahuwera Mountain.

Ngāti Paretekawa was named after the eponymous ancestor Paretekawa, the daughter of Ngāti Maniapoto chief TeKanawa, and a Ngāti Hikairo woman called Whaeapare (Hikairo's sister).

Paretekawa traditions recount that the Ngāti Paretekawa hapū origins became recognised in the period of Peehi Tukorehu and his Tuakana (elder brothers) Te Uaki, Te Akanui, and Te Rangihiroa and tuahine (sister) Whaeapare II. while others who descend from Tukorehu dispute this assertion, based on evidence by Te Winitana Tupotahi. Peehi Tukorehu was grandfather of Te Winitana Tupotahi, and grand-uncle of Manga Rewi Maniapoto,

According to Māori Land Court evidence given by Te Winitana Tupötahi and Te Köhika Te Huia, as a result of a disagreement between Peehi Tükörehu and one of his tuakana (elder siblings) Te Akanui, while at Haereawätea, that section of Te Akanui’s people, left the district for Kawhia, including Te Ngohi and whānau, Manga Maniapoto, Ngāti Kaputuhi and others, and eventually settled in the Mokau-Kahuwera region to the south, leaving only the Ngāti Paretekawa under Peehi Tukorehu, and his elder brother Te Rangihiroa, and sister Wheapare II, and their whānau and Ngāti Paretekawa hapū, and others, in occupation of their ancestral tribal lands in the Otawhao, Moeawha and Turata districts.

The eventual invasion of those lands by British forces in 1864 saw the final loss of the bulk of those ancestral tribal lands to Crown confiscation by the Crowns Government in New Zealand. Branches of Ngāti Paretekawa also migrated to Taumarunui, Kawhia, and Marokopa during the Land Wars.
