= Otukou =

Rural community in the Taupo District of New Zealand

Coordinates: 39.075023°S 175.705236°E

Otukou (Māori: Ōtukou) is a rural community in the Taupō District and Waikato region of New Zealand's North Island.

The main Otukou settlement is located on State Highway 46, on the south-eastern shore of Lake Rotoaira.

Okahukura Bush lies to the south, at the north end of the Tongariro Crossing.

== Marae ==
Otūkou Marae, located west of the lake, is a meeting place of the local Ngāti Tūwharetoa hapū of Ngāti Hikairo. It includes the Okahukura meeting house.

In October 2020, the Government committed $1,338,668 from the Provincial Growth Fund to upgrade the marae and 4 other Ngāti Tūwharetoa marae, creating 19 jobs.
