= Onewhero =

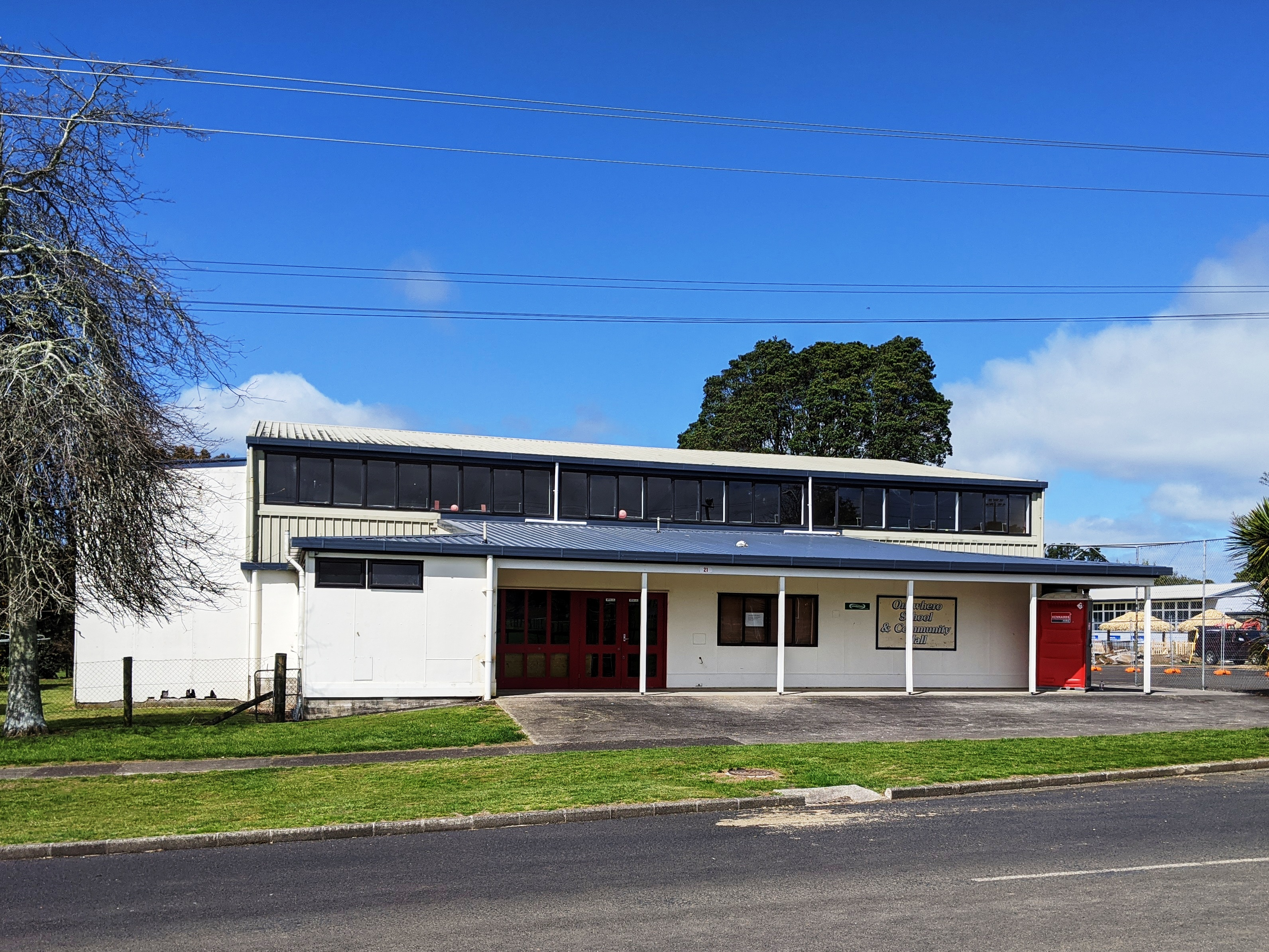
- School and Community hall
- Interactive map of Onewhero
- Country: New Zealand
- Region: Waikato
- District: Waikato District
- Wards: Awaroa-Maramarua General Ward; Tai Raro Takiwaa Maaori Ward
- Community: Rural Port Waikato Community
- Electorates: Port Waikato; Hauraki-Waikato (Māori)

Government
  - Territorial Authority: Waikato District Council
  - Regional council: Waikato Regional Council
  - Mayor of Waikato: Aksel Bech
  - Port Waikato MP: Andrew Bayly
  - Hauraki-Waikato MP: Hana-Rawhiti Maipi-Clarke

Area
  - Total: 21.84 km^{2} (8.43 sq mi)

Population (2023 Census)
  - Total: 627
  - Density: 28.7/km^{2} (74.4/sq mi)

Onewhero is a village and rural community in the Waikato District and Waikato region of New Zealand's North Island.

Pukekohe and Tuakau are located north of Onewhero, across the Waikato River;

The name Onewhero translates from Maori as "Red Earth", which describes the soil colour typical in the Franklin region.

The Onewhero village consists of an Anglican church, school, fire station, garage, lawn bowls club and tennis club. The Onewhero Society of Performing Arts runs a local performing arts theatre, and the local rugby club hosts community events and community board meetings. The Onewhero Golf Club is located in nearby Pukekawa.

The local Te Awamaarahi marae is a meeting ground for the Waikato Tainui hapū of Ngāti Āmaru, Ngāti Pou and Ngāti Tiipa. It includes the wharenui (meeting house) of Whare Wōnanga.

North of Onewhero, Harker Reserve has 12 m (39 ft) (or 20m) high Te Wai Heke O Maoa, or Vivian Falls, and a 3 km (1.9 mi) bush walkway. It is near the end of Miller Rd. The waterfall goes over the edge of South Auckland volcanic field's Onewhero maar crater, falling onto Miocene aged Carter Siltstone.

== Demographics ==
Onewhero is in three SA1 statistical areas which cover 21.85 km^{2} (8.44 sq mi). The SA1 areas are part of the larger Onewhero statistical area.

Historical population for Onewhero and surrounds
Year	Pop.	±% p.a.
2006	525	—
2013	537	+0.32%
2018	552	+0.55%
2023	627	+2.58%

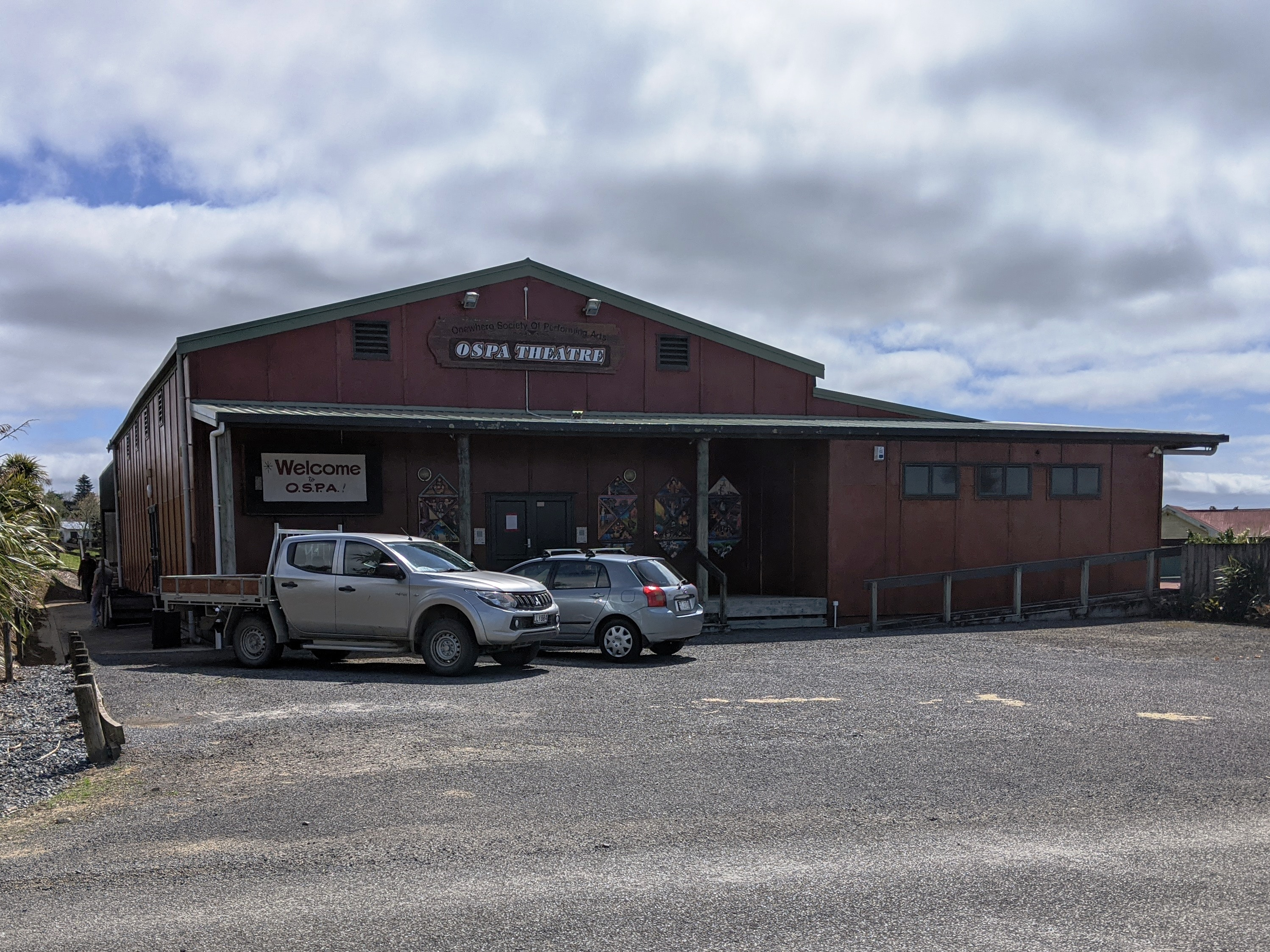
Onewhero Society of Performing Arts Theatre

The SA1 areas had a population of 627 in the 2023 New Zealand census, an increase of 75 people (13.6%) since the 2018 census, and an increase of 90 people (16.8%) since the 2013 census. There were 315 males, 309 females and 3 people of other genders in 213 dwellings. 2.4% of people identified as LGBTIQ+. There were 132 people (21.1%) aged under 15 years, 96 (15.3%) aged 15 to 29, 294 (46.9%) aged 30 to 64, and 108 (17.2%) aged 65 or older.

People could identify as more than one ethnicity. The results were 92.3% European (Pākehā); 17.2% Māori; 7.2% Pasifika; 3.8% Asian; and 0.5% Middle Eastern, Latin American and African New Zealanders (MELAA). English was spoken by 97.6%, Māori language by 3.3%, Samoan by 0.5%, and other languages by 5.3%. No language could be spoken by 1.9% (e.g. too young to talk). New Zealand Sign Language was known by 0.5%. The percentage of people born overseas was 16.7, compared with 28.8% nationally.

Religious affiliations were 27.8% Christian, 0.5% Māori religious beliefs, 0.5% New Age, and 1.0% other religions. People who answered that they had no religion were 62.2%, and 8.6% of people did not answer the census question.

Of those at least 15 years old, 87 (17.6%) people had a bachelor's or higher degree, 288 (58.2%) had a post-high school certificate or diploma, and 111 (22.4%) people exclusively held high school qualifications. 66 people (13.3%) earned over $100,000 compared to 12.1% nationally. The employment status of those at least 15 was that 291 (58.8%) people were employed full-time, 60 (12.1%) were part-time, and 9 (1.8%) were unemployed.

=== Onewhero statistical area ===
Onewhero statistical area, which also includes Te Kohanga, covers 385.08 km^{2} (148.68 sq mi) and had an estimated population of 2,150 as of June 2025, with a population density of 5.6 people per km^{2}.

Historical population for Onewhero statistical area
Year	Pop.	±% p.a.
2006	1,485	—
2013	1,869	+3.34%
2018	1,953	+0.88%
2023	2,097	+1.43%
The 2006 population is for a smaller area of 205.40 km^{2}. Source: source=

Onewhero statistical area had a population of 2,097 in the 2023 New Zealand census, an increase of 144 people (7.4%) since the 2018 census, and an increase of 228 people (12.2%) since the 2013 census. There were 1,080 males, 1,011 females and 3 people of other genders in 714 dwellings. 1.7% of people identified as LGBTIQ+. The median age was 41.6 years (compared with 38.1 years nationally). There were 444 people (21.2%) aged under 15 years, 327 (15.6%) aged 15 to 29, 1,002 (47.8%) aged 30 to 64, and 324 (15.5%) aged 65 or older.

People could identify as more than one ethnicity. The results were 83.8% European (Pākehā); 24.6% Māori; 5.3% Pasifika; 3.9% Asian; 0.7% Middle Eastern, Latin American and African New Zealanders (MELAA); and 3.9% other, which includes people giving their ethnicity as "New Zealander". English was spoken by 97.4%, Māori language by 6.4%, Samoan by 0.1%, and other languages by 6.0%. No language could be spoken by 1.7% (e.g. too young to talk). New Zealand Sign Language was known by 0.3%. The percentage of people born overseas was 15.7, compared with 28.8% nationally.

Religious affiliations were 28.2% Christian, 0.3% Hindu, 0.1% Islam, 1.7% Māori religious beliefs, 0.3% Buddhist, 0.3% New Age, and 1.0% other religions. People who answered that they had no religion were 57.8%, and 10.9% of people did not answer the census question.

Of those at least 15 years old, 279 (16.9%) people had a bachelor's or higher degree, 939 (56.8%) had a post-high school certificate or diploma, and 432 (26.1%) people exclusively held high school qualifications. The median income was $42,200, compared with $41,500 nationally. 189 people (11.4%) earned over $100,000 compared to 12.1% nationally. The employment status of those at least 15 was that 933 (56.4%) people were employed full-time, 225 (13.6%) were part-time, and 33 (2.0%) were unemployed.

== Education ==
The main school is Onewhero Area School, which serves from Years 1 to 13 with a roll of 390 as of July 2026. The school first opened in 1891, and became a District High School in 1955.

There is also a preschool for children under 5 years.
