= Matakore =

Māori rangatira (chieftain)

Marae of the Ngāti Matakore hapū.
1 Kakepuku Papakainga
2 Kahotea
3 Otewa
4 Kaputahi
5 Napinapi
6 Mangapeehi Marae
7 Te Hape Marae
8 Te Hiiri o Mahuta

Matakore was a Māori rangatira (chieftain) of Ngāti Maniapoto in the Tainui tribal confederation from the Waikato region, New Zealand. He is an ancestor of the Ngāti Matakore hapū (sub-tribe) of Ngāti Maniapoto and of the southern branch of Ngāti Raukawa. He probably lived in the early seventeenth century.

== Life ==
Matakore was the third-born son of Rereahu, who was a direct descendant of Hoturoa (the commander of the Tainui canoe), and his first wife, Rangi-ānewa, daughter of Tamāio. His mother was Hine-au-pounamu, Rereahu’s second wife, whose parents were Tū-a-tangiroa of Tainui and a daughter of the Ngāti-Hā chief Hā-kūhā-nui. Matakore had an older half-brother, Te Ihinga-a-rangi, five full brothers (Maniapoto, Tū-whakahekeao, Tūrongo-tapu-ārau, Te Io-wānanga or Te Āio-wānanga, Kahu-ariari), and two sisters (Kinohaku and Te Rongorito), many of whom were the ancestors of hapū (sub-tribes) of Ngāti Maniapoto.

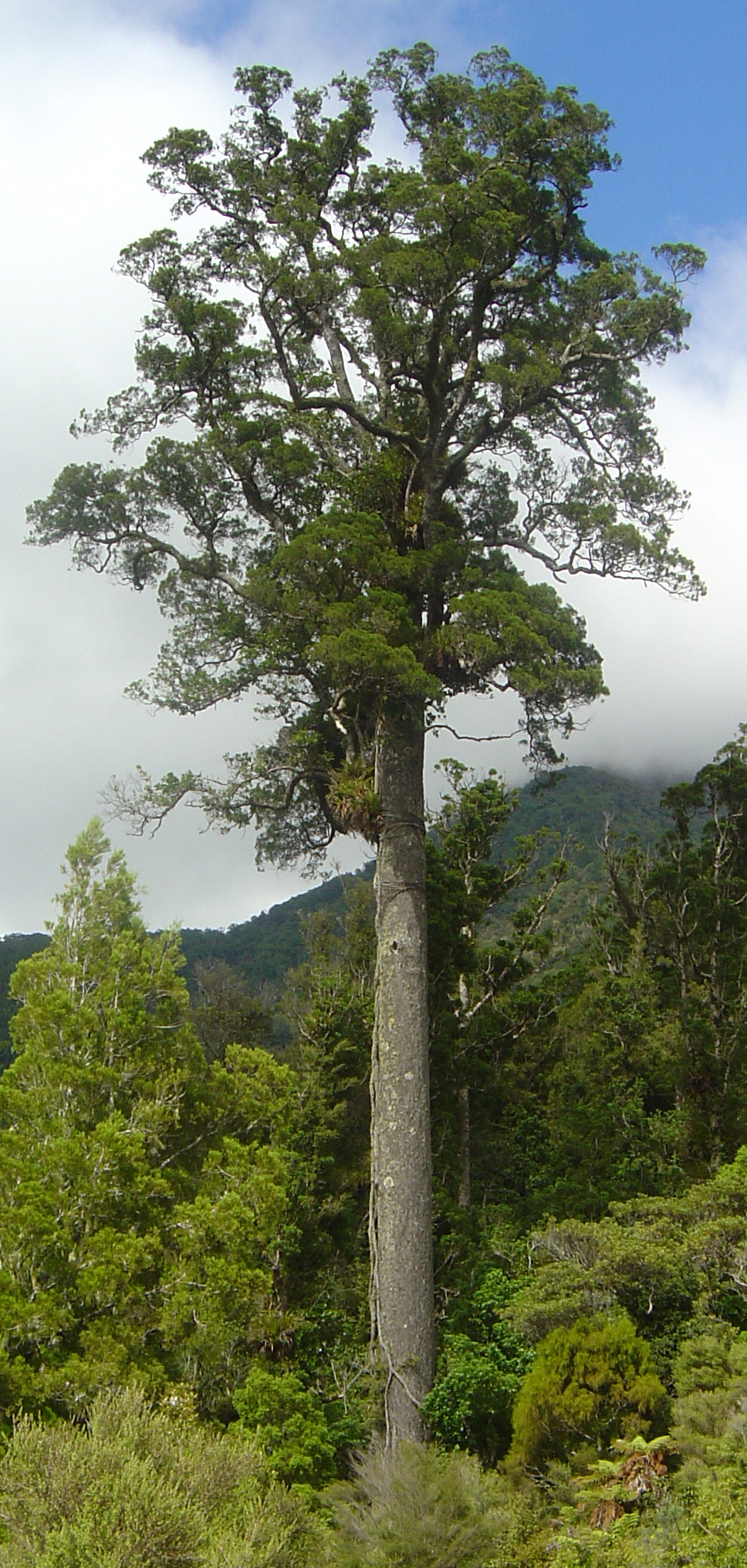
A mature kahikatea tree.

Matakore and Maniapoto both settled in the Mohoao-nui swamp, east of Ōtorohanga. They both decided to build houses at Waiponga on the north bank of the Waipā River a little to the east of Ōtorohanga. Matakore found a tall kahikatea at Mangawhero which he chopped down and brought there to use as the tāhuhu (ridge beam) of his house, but Maniapoto advised him that its length meant that it was in danger of splitting and advised him to cut it shorter. Then Maniapoto went into the forest and chopped down a taller kahikatea for himself, so that he would have the larger house. Matakore's house was called Mata-keretū and Maniapoto's was called Mata-whaiora. As of 1898, their foundations were still visible.

When Rereahu was on his death-bed he decided to give his mana to Maniapoto, rather than Te Ihinga-a-rangi, because he thought the younger brother had proven himself a better leader. This led to a conflict between Maniapoto and Te Ihinga-a-rangi, in which Matakore supported Maniapoto. As a result, after his victory, Maniapoto favoured Matakore highly and granted him control of all his lands south of the Waipā River and in the Rangitoto Range. Tania Ka'ai cites the relationship between the two brothers as an exemplary case of the “mutually satisfying relationship” expected between tuakana (‘elder brother’) and teina (‘younger brother’) in Māori culture.

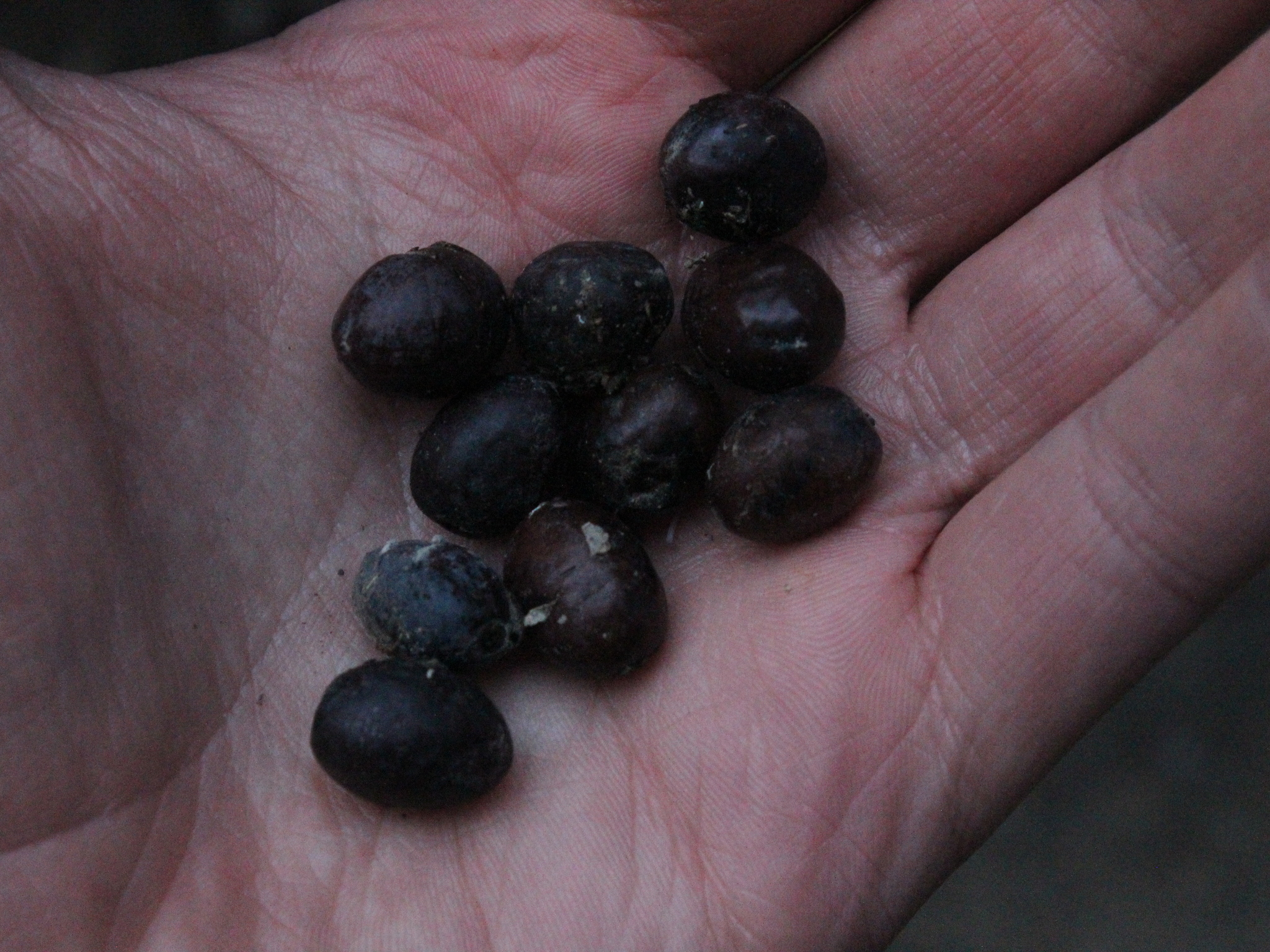
hīnau berries.

Matakore spent the rest of his life at peace and was very prosperous. Due to his great mana it was customary for the people to offer him the first part of anything that they caught in the river or in the mountains. A Tainui tradition reports that, on one occasion, the people came with these offerings when he was asleep, but when they woke him up, he looked at the food and then went back to sleep, saying “If you wake me up, let it be for the whatu turei of Rua.” Whatu turei was a cake made out of hīnau berries, but the phrase is a sexual double entendre. The story is told as a contrast with the gluttonous behaviour of some other chiefs and Matakore’s phrase has become a Māori proverb (whakataukī).

== Family ==
Matakore married Wai-harapepe, a descendant of Hekemaru, son of the Te Arawa chief Pikiao and they had a son:

- Mania-takamaiwaho, who married Tore-kauaea, daughter of Tū-te-ao-mārama.

He also married Tuki-taua, daughter of Wairere and had a daughter:

- Waiko-hika, who married Te Kanawa the elder and had two daughters: Pare-nga-ope and Tira-manu-whiri.

Matakore’s descendants, Ngāti Matakore, share seven marae in the southern Waikato with various other hapū of Ngāti Maniapoto, and one marae in Manawatu with hapū of Ngāti Raukawa and Ngāti Toa.

== Sources ==
Pei Te Hurinui Jones gives an account of Matakore’s life based on accounts he had heard from Tainui elders.

== Bibliography ==
- Jones, Pei Te Hurinui; Biggs, Bruce (2004). Ngā iwi o Tainui : nga koorero tuku iho a nga tuupuna = The traditional history of the Tainui people. Auckland [N.Z.]: Auckland University Press. ISBN 1869403312.
- White, John (1888). The Ancient History of The Maori, his Mythology and Traditions: Tai-Nui. Vol. 4. Wellington: Government Printer.
