= Ngāti Mahuta =

Sub-tribe of the Waikato tribe of Māori in New Zealand

- Iwi (tribe) in Māoridom
- Rohe (region): Waikato

Locations of marae associated with Ngāti Mahuta.

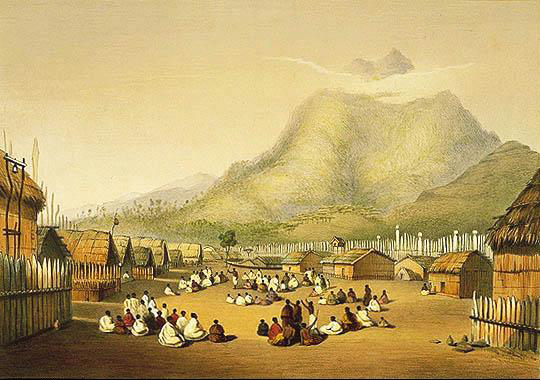

Ngāti Mahuta is a sub-tribe (or hapū) of the Waikato tribe (or iwi) of Māori in the North Island of New Zealand. The territory (rohe) of Ngāti Mahuta is the Kawhia and Huntly areas of the Waikato region.

== History ==
Ngāti Mahuta is descended from Mahuta, whose father was Hekemaru. Mahuta's paternal grandparents were Pikiao from the Te Arawa tribe, and Rereiao, a high-born Waikato woman descended from Whatihua. After the Ngāti Mahuta ariki Wharetiperi and Tapaue conquered the Te Iranui people around 1700 AD, Ngāti Mahuta settled around the fertile lands at the base of Mount Taupiri on the Waikato River. Kaitotehe and nearby Mount Taupiri were Ngāti Mahuta's headquarters in early years.

Pōtatau Te Wherowhero, the paramount chief of Ngāti Mahuta in his time, became the first Māori king.

== Marae and wharenui ==
There are 19 marae (meeting grounds) affiliated with Ngāti Mahuta. Most include a wharenui (meeting house).

=== Māngere ===
There is one marae in Māngere affiliated with the iwi:

- Te Puea Memorial Marae and Te Puea Wharenui on Miro Street in Māngere Bridge

=== Te Kauwhata ===
There are four marae near Te Kauwhata affiliated with the iwi:

- Ōkarea marae and Pokaiwhenua wharenui on Jamieson Road in Waerenga
- Taniwha marae and Me Whakatupu ki te Hua o te Rengarenga marae on McGovern Road in Waeranga
- Matahuru Papakainga marae on Tahuna Road in Ohinewai
- Waikare marae on Waerenga Road

=== Huntly ===
There are four marae in and around the Huntly township affiliated with the iwi:

- Kaitumutumu marae and Ruateateam wharenui on Ohaki Road
- Te Ōhākī marae and Te Ōhākī a Te Puea wharenui on Te Ōhakī Road in Te Ōhakī
- Te Kauri marae and Karaka wharenui on Hetherington Road
- Waahi marae and Tāne i te Pupuke wharenui on Harris Road

=== Ngāruawāhia ===
There are three marae in and around Ngāruawāhia and Taupiri affiliated with the iwi:

- Taupiri marae, including Pani Ora and Te Puna Tangata wharenui, on Kainui Road in Taupiri
- Waikeri – Tangirau marae on Ngaruawahia Road in Ngāruawāhia
- Tūrangawaewae marae, including Mahinaarangi - Turongo wharenui, on River Road in Ngāruawāhia

=== Te Awamutu ===
There is one marae near Te Awamutu affiliated with the iwi:

- Te Kōpua marae and Ko Unu wharenui on Morgan Road in Pokuru

=== Aotea Harbour ===
There are three marae around Aotea Harbour affiliated with the iwi:

- Mōtakotako (Taruke) marae and Te Ōhākī a Mahuta wharenui on Phillips Road in Aotea
- Te Papatapu (Te Wehi) marae and Pare Whakarukuruku wharenui on Te Papatapu Road in Aotea
- Te Tihi o Moerangi marae and Te Tihi o Moerangi wharenui on Kawhia Road in Makomako

=== Kawhia Harbour ===
There are four marae around Kawhia Harbour affiliated with the iwi:

- Maketū marae and Auau ki te Rangi wharenui on Kaora Street in Kawhia
- Ōkapu marae and Te Kotahitanga o Ngāti Te Weehi wharenui on Aotea Road in Kawhia
- Āruka marae and Tahaaroa wharenui on Āruka Marae Road in Taharoa
- Te Kōraha marae and Te Ōhākī wharenui on Taharoa Road in Taharoa
