= List of schools in Waikato =

The Waikato region of the North Island of New Zealand contains numerous small rural primary schools, some small town primary and secondary schools, and city schools in Hamilton.

Schools in the Waitomo District and Taupo Districts that are located in other regions (namely Manawatu-Wanganui, Hawke's Bay and Bay of Plenty) are listed here. Schools in the Rotorua District that are located in the Waikato region are listed at list of schools in the Bay of Plenty region.

In New Zealand schools, students begin formal education in Year 1 at the age of five. Year 13 is the final year of secondary education. Years 14 and 15 refer to adult education facilities.

State schools are those fully funded by the government and at which no fees for tuition of domestic students (i.e. New Zealand citizens and permanent residents, and Australian citizens) can be charged, although a donation is commonly requested. A state integrated school is a former private school with a special character based on a religious or philosophical belief that has been integrated into the state system. State integrated schools charge "attendance dues" to cover the building and maintenance of school buildings, which are not owned by the government, but otherwise they like state schools cannot charge fees for tuition of domestic students but may request a donation. Private schools charge fees to its students for tuition, as do state and state integrated schools for tuition of international students.

The equity index (EQI) is a measure of the average socioeconomic status of the school's roll: the higher the number, the more socioeconomic barriers students face to achievement. For statistical purposes, schools are banded into seven bands based on their EQI and the barriers faced: fewest, few, below average, average, above average, many, and most. The EQI and band given here are based on figures from 2026. The roll of each school changes frequently as students start school for the first time, move between schools, and graduate. The rolls given here are those provided by the Ministry of Education are based on figures from November 2012. The Ministry of Education institution number links to the Education Counts page for each school.

== Thames-Coromandel District ==
Name	MOE	Years	Area	Authority	Roll	Website
Colville School	1706	1–8	Colville	State	37	-
Coroglen School	1707	1–8	Coroglen	State	23	-
Coromandel Area School	109	1–13	Coromandel	State	206	
Hikuai School	1737	1–8	Hikuai	State	42	
Hikutaia School	1738	1–8	Hikutaia	State	130	-
Manaia School	1798	1–8	Manaia	State	244	
Matatoki School	1819	1–8	Matatoki	State	82	-
Mercury Bay Area School	110	1–13	Whitianga	State	879	
Moanataiari School	1829	1–8	Thames	State	121	-
Opoutere School	1867	1–8	Opoutere	State	112	
Parawai School	1886	1–8	Thames	State	225	
Puriri School	1911	1–8	Puriri	State	24	
St Francis School	1945	1–8	Thames	State integrated	81	-
Tairua School	1975	1–8	Tairua	State	133	-
Tapu School	1980	1–8	Tapu	State	5	
Te Puru School	1912	1–8	Te Puru	State	159	
Te Rerenga School	2021	1–8	Te Rerenga	State	111	-
Thames High School	111	9–13	Thames	State	410	
Thames South School	2027	1–8	Thames	State	57	
TKKM o Harataunga	1773	1–8	Kennedy Bay	State	13	-
Whangamata Area School	428	1–13	Whangamatā	State	556	
Whenuakite School	2088	1–8	Whenuakite	State	150	

=== Former schools ===
- The Coromandel Learning Centre was a private coeducational primary school for years 1–8, in Coromandel.
- Coromandel Rudolf Steiner School was a small private full primary (years 1-8) school. It closed at the end of 2007.
- Kauaeranga Valley School flourished between 1903 and 1933.

== Hauraki District ==
Name	Years	Area	Authority	Roll	Website	MOE	ERO
Goldfields School	–	Paeroa	State	93		1726	1726
Hauraki Plains College	9–13	Ngatea	State	909		112	112
Kaiaua School	1–8	Kaiaua	State	41	-	1323	1323
Kaihere School	1–8	Kaihere	State	43		1757	1757
Karangahake School	1–8	Karangahake	State	49		1763	1763
Kerepehi School	1–8	Kerepehi	State	68	-	1775	1775
Kopuarahi School	1–8	Pipiroa	State	7		1782	1782
Miller Avenue School	1–8	Paeroa	State	79		1827	1827
Netherton School	1–8	Netherton	State	133		1842	1842
Ngatea School	1–8	Ngatea	State	267		1850	1850
Paeroa Central School	1–8	Paeroa	State	68	-	1883	1883
Paeroa Christian School	1–8	Paeroa	State integrated	45		1169	1169
Paeroa College	9-13	Paeroa	State	341		113	113
St Joseph's Catholic School (Paeroa)	1–8	Paeroa	State integrated	50		1951	1951
St Joseph's Catholic School (Waihi)	1–8	Waihi	State integrated	51		1954	1954
Tirohia School	1–8	Tirohia	State	32		2033	2033
Turua Primary School	1–8	Turua	State	106		2043	2043
Waihi Central School	1–6	Waihi	State	105		2050	2050
Waihi College	7–13	Waihi	State	570		114	114
Waihi East Primary School	1–6	Waihi	State	225		2049	2049
Waikino School	1–6	Waikino	State	81		2054	2054
Waimata School	1–6	Waimata	State	48		2058	2058
Waitakaruru School	1–8	Waitakaruru	State	89		2069	2069

== Waikato District ==
Name	Years	Area	Authority	Roll	Website	MOE	ERO
Aka Aka School	1–8	Aka Aka	State	48		1201	1201
Glen Massey School	1–8	Glen Massey	State	115		1723	1723
Gordonton School	1–8	Gordonton	State	238		1728	1728
Hamilton Seventh-day Adventist School	1–8	Tamahere	State integrated	117		4105	4105
Harrisville School	1–6	Harrisville	State	180		1303	1303
Horotiu School	1–8	Horotiu	State	197		1746	1746
Horsham Downs School	1–8	Horsham Downs	State	353		1747	1747
Huntly College	9–13	Huntly	State	206		119	119
Huntly Primary School	1–8	Huntly	State	186		1751	1751
Huntly West School	1–8	Huntly	State	108		1752	1752
Kimihia School	1–8	Kimihia	State	311		1777	1777
Mangatangi School	1–8	Mangatangi	State	102		1344	1344
Mangatawhiri School	1–8	Mangatawhiri	State	154		1345	1345
Maramarua School	1–8	Maramarua	State	104		1358	1358
Matangi School	1–6	Matangi	State	183		1814	1814
Meremere School	1–8	Meremere	State	9		1373	1373
Newstead Model School	1–6	Newstead	State	141		1843	1843
Ngaruawahia High School	9–13	Ngāruawāhia	State	379		127	127
Ngaruawahia School	1–8	Ngāruawāhia	State	154		1849	1849
Ngāti Haua School	1–8	Pukemoremore	State	112	-	1851	1851
Ohinewai School	1–8	Ohinewai	State	112		1856	1856
Onewhero Area School	1–13	Onewhero	State	395		108	108
Orini Combined School	1–8	Orini	State	85		1869	1869
Otaua School	1–8	Otaua	State	218		1410	1410
Pokeno School	1–8	Pōkeno	State	635		1442	1442
Pukekawa School	1–6	Pukekawa	State	74		1449	1449
Pukeoware School	1–8	Waiuku	State	158		1454	1454
Puketaha School	1–8	Puketaha	State	290		1907	1907
Raglan Area School	1–15	Raglan	State	586		125	125
Rangiriri School	1–8	Rangiriri	State	58	-	1919	1919
Rotokauri School	1–8	Rotokauri	State	227		1930	1930
Ruawaro Combined School	1–8	Ruawaro	State	20	-	1937	1937
St Anthony's Catholic School	1–8	Huntly	State integrated	94		1943	1943
St Paul's Catholic School	1–8	Ngāruawāhia	State integrated	107		1963	1963
Tai Wananga	9–15	Ruakura	State	169		632	632
Tamahere Model Country School	1–6	Tamahere	State	354		1976	1976
Taupiri School	1–8	Taupiri	State	103		1987	1987
Tauwhare School	1–6	Tauwhare	State	110		1995	1995
Te Akau School	1–8	Te Ākau	State	46	-	1998	1998
Te Kauwhata College	7–15	Te Kauwhata	State	522		115	115
Te Kauwhata Primary School	1–6	Te Kauwhata	State	354		2005	2005
Te Kohanga School	1–6	Te Kohanga	State	21		1533	1533
Te Kowhai School	1–8	Te Kowhai	State	300		2007	2007
Te Mata School	1–8	Te Mata	State	150		2010	2010
Te Paina School	1–8	Mercer	State	59		1372	1372
Te Uku School	1–8	Te Uku	State	129		2024	2024
Te Wharekura o Rakaumangamanga	1–13	Huntly	State	402		1917	1917
TKK o Puaha o Waikato	1–8	Port Waikato	State	50	-	1151	1151
TKKM o Bernard Fergusson	1–8	Ngāruawāhia	State	168		1696	1696
Tuakau College	7–13	Tuakau	State	1,029		106	106
Tuakau School	1–6	Tuakau	State	227		1539	1539
Waerenga School	1–6	Waerenga	State	102		2046	2046
Waikaretu School	1–8	Waikaretu	State	18		2052	2052
Waikato Montessori Education Centre	1–8	Tamahere	Private	54		671	671
Waingaro School	1–8	Waingaro	State	6		2060	2060
Waipa School	1–8	Ngāruawāhia	State	312		2064	2064
Waitetuna School	1–8	Waitetuna	State	66		2071	2071
Whatawhata School	1–8	Whatawhata	State	260		2087	2087
Whitikahu School	1–8	Whitikahu	State	51		2090	2090

Pukemiro School opened in 1905 and closed in 2021.

== Matamata-Piako District ==
Name	Years	Gender	Area	Authority	EQI (band)	Roll	Website	MOE	ERO
David Street School	1–6	Coed	Morrinsville	State	453 (average)	479		1709	1709
Elstow-Waihou Combined School	1–8	Coed	Waihou	State	449 (average)	158		1713	1713
Firth School	1–6	Coed	Matamata	State	511 (many)	228		1719	1719
Hinuera School	1–6	Coed	Hinuera	State	435 (below average)	151		1741	1741
Kiwitahi School	1–6	Coed	Kiwitahi	State	439 (below average)	84		1780	1780
Manawaru School	1–8	Coed	Manawaru	State	447 (below average)	74		1800	1800
Matamata Christian School	1–8	Coed	Matamata	State integrated	425 (few)	135		1186	
Matamata College	9–15	Coed	Matamata	State	479 (above average)	855		124	124
Matamata Intermediate	7–8	Coed	Matamata	State	472 (above average)	394		1812	1812
Matamata Primary School	1–6	Coed	Matamata	State	443 (below average)	476		1813	1813
Morrinsville College	9–15	Coed	Morrinsville	State	481 (above average)	768		126	126
Morrinsville Intermediate	7–8	Coed	Morrinsville	State	478 (above average)	352		1833	1833
Morrinsville School	1–6	Coed	Morrinsville	State	502 (many)	218		1834	1834
Motumaoho School	1–6	Coed	Motumaoho	State	488 (above average)	25		1835	1835
Springdale School	1–8	Coed	Springdale	State	490 (above average)	32		1941	1941
St Joseph's Catholic School (Matamata)	1–8	Coed	Matamata	State integrated	447 (below average)	22		1947	1947
St Joseph's Catholic School (Morrinsville)	1–8	Coed	Morrinsville	State integrated	420 (few)	173		1949	1949
St Joseph's Catholic School (Te Aroha)	1–8	Coed	Te Aroha	State integrated	446 (below average)	61		1952	1952
Stanley Avenue School	1–8	Coed	Te Aroha	State	477 (above average)	258		1967	1967
Tahuna School	1–6	Coed	Tahuna	State	459 (average)	77		1972	1972
Tatuanui School	1–6	Coed	Tatuanui	State	426 (few)	124		1983	1983
Tauhei Combined School	1–6	Coed	Mangateparu	State	456 (average)	47		1985	1985
Te Aroha College	9–15	Coed	Te Aroha	State	492 (above average)	424		116	116
Te Aroha Primary School	1–8	Coed	Te Aroha	State	496 (many)	215	-	1999	1999
Te Kura o Waharoa	1–6	Coed	Waharoa	State	563 (most)	43		2047	2047
Te Poi School	1–6	Coed	Te Poi	State	486 (above average)	51		2014	2014
Te Wharekura o Te Rau Aroha	1–15	Coed	Ngarua	State	539 (most)	132	-	3115	3115
Wairere School	1–6	Coed	Waharoa	State	477 (above average)	40		2075	2075
Walton School	1–6	Coed	Walton	State	456 (average)	118		2074	2074

== Hamilton City ==
=== Primary and intermediate schools ===
Name	MOE	Years	Area	Authority	Roll	Website	Notes
Aberdeen School	1680	1–6	Dinsdale	State	682		
Bankwood School	1693	1–6	Chartwell	State	337		
Crawshaw School	2096	1–8	Crawshaw	State	278	-	
Deanwell School	1710	1–6	Deanwell	State	358		
Endeavour School	6941	1–6	Flagstaff	State	430		
Fairfield Intermediate	1715	7–8	Fairfield	State	895		
Fairfield Primary School	1716	1–6	Fairfield	State	328		
Forest Lake School	1720	1–6	Forest Lake	State	342	-	
Frankton School	1721	1–6	Frankton	State	664		
Glenview School	1725	1–6	Glenview	State	393		
Hamilton East School	1731	1–6	Hamilton East	State	476		
Hamilton West School	1733	1–8	Hamilton West	State	670		established 1864
Hillcrest Normal School	1739	1–6	Hillcrest	State	597		
Hukanui School	1749	1–6	Chartwell	State	804		
Insoll Avenue School	1753	1–6	Enderley	State	337	-	
Knighton Normal School	1781	1–6	Hillcrest	State	618		
Maeroa Intermediate	1792	7–8	Maeroa	State	708		
Marian Catholic School	2094	1–8	Hamilton East	State integrated	603		Catholic
Melville Primary School	1824	1–6	Melville	State	238	-	
Nawton School	1841	1–6	Nawton	State	472		
Peachgrove Intermediate	1892	7–8	Claudelands	State	515		
Pukete School	1908	1–6	Pukete	State	386		
Rhode Street School	1924	1–8	Frankton	State	195		
Rototuna Primary School	6976	1–6	Rototuna	State	774		
Silverdale Normal School	1940	1–6	Silverdale	State	347		
Southwell School	4141	1–8	Claudelands	Private	648		Anglican, boarding
St Columba's Catholic School	1944	1–8	Dinsdale	State integrated	461		Catholic
St Joseph's Catholic School	1946	1–8	Fairfield	State integrated	328		Catholic
St Peter Chanel Catholic School	1964	1–8	Te Rapa	State integrated	273		Catholic
St Pius X Catholic School	1966	1–8	Melville	State integrated	259		Catholic
Te Ao Marama School	780	1–6	Flagstaff	State	442		Opened February 2019
Te Rapa School	2020	1–8	Te Rapa	State	502		
Te Totara Primary School	577	1–6	Rototuna North	State	689		
Te Kura Kaupapa Māori o Toku Mapihi Maurea	1589	1–8	Ruakura	State	91	-	
Vardon School	2045	1–6	Beerescourt	State	329		
Waikato Waldorf School	539	1–8	St James Park	State integrated	181		Waldorf education
Whitiora School	2091	1–8	Whitiora	State	200	-	
Woodstock School	2093	1–6	Fairfield	State	377		

=== Secondary and composite schools ===
Name	MOE	Years	Gender	Area	Authority	Opened	Roll	Website	Notes
Berkley Normal Middle School	1695	7–9	Coed	Riverlea	State	1971	766		
Fairfield College	129	9–13	Coed	Fairfield	State	1957	1,030		
Fraser High School	135	9–13	Coed	Nawton	State	1969	1,499		
Hamilton Boys' High School	131	9–13	Boys	Hamilton East	State	1955	2,321		Boarding
Hamilton Christian School	451	1–13	Coed	Rototuna North	State Integrated	1982	972		Nondenominational Christian
Hamilton Girls' High School	132	9–13	Girls	Hamilton Lake	State	1955	1,858		Boarding
Hamilton Junior High School	1942	7–10	Coed	St Andrews	State	1977	142		Formerly St Andrews Intermediate School
Hillcrest High School	138	9–13	Coed	Silverdale	State	1972	1,859		
Mangakōtukutuku College	3612	7–13	Coed	Glenview	State	2024	779		
Nga Taiatea Wharekura	488	9–13	Coed	Rotokauri	State	2004	287		
Rototuna Junior High School	708	7–10	Coed	Rototuna North	State	2016	1,363		
Rototuna Senior High School	615	11–13	Coed	Rototuna North	State	2017	1,047		
Sacred Heart Girls College	139	9–13	Girls	Hamilton East	State integrated	1884	946		Catholic
St John's College	136	9–13	Boys	Hillcrest	State integrated	1961	982		Catholic
St Paul's Collegiate School	130	9–13	Boys/Coed	Chartwell	Private	1959	973		Anglican, boarding
Te Wharekura o Kirikiriroa	1718	1–13	Coed	Enderley	State	2003	315		
Waikato Diocesan School For Girls	140	9–13	Girls	River Road	State integrated	1909	689		Anglican, boarding

=== Special schools ===
Name	MOE	Years	Gender	Area	Authority	Roll	Website	Notes
Fraser High School TPU	2759	5–21	Coed	Nawton	State	304	[3]https://www.fraser.school.nz/ Fraser High School	Teen parent unit
Hamilton North School	1732	5–21	Coed	St Andrews	State	167	Hamilton North School	Special school for intellectual impairments
Patricia Avenue School	1891	5–21	Coed	Claudelands	State	211	Patricia Avenue School	Founded in 1965

=== Former schools ===
- Melville High School, founded in 1964 and closed at the end of 2023.
- Melville Intermediate, closed at the end of 2023.

== Waipa District ==
Name	Years	Gender	Area	Authority	EQI (band)	Roll	Website	MOE	ERO
Cambridge East School	1–6	Coed	Cambridge	State	419 (few)	329		1700	1700
Cambridge High School	9–15	Coed	Cambridge	State	447 (below average)	1,813		142	142
Cambridge Middle School	7–10	Coed	Cambridge	State	431 (below average)	593		1701	1701
Cambridge School	1–6	Coed	Cambridge	State	403 (few)	377		1702	1702
Goodwood School	1–6	Coed	Fencourt	State	388 (fewest)	405		1727	1727
Hautapu School	1–8	Coed	Hautapu	State	420 (few)	192		1735	1735
Horahora School	1–8	Coed	Maungatautari	State	441 (below average)	40		1744	1744
Kaipaki School	1–8	Coed	Kaipaki	State	417 (few)	119		1760	1760
Karapiro School	1–6	Coed	Karapiro	State	499 (many)	26		1764	1764
Kihikihi School	1–6	Coed	Kihikihi	State	524 (most)	154		1776	1776
Koromatua School	1–8	Coed	Temple View	State	473 (above average)	211		1784	1784
Leamington School	1–6	Coed	Cambridge	State	444 (below average)	463		1789	1789
Ngahinapouri School	1–8	Coed	Ngāhinapōuri	State	415 (few)	173		1844	1844
Ōhaupō School	1–8	Coed	Ōhaupō	State	421 (few)	198		1855	1855
Paterangi School	1–8	Coed	Paterangi	State	467 (average)	90		1889	1889
Pekapekarau School	1–6	Coed	Te Awamutu	State	493 (above average)	276		1893	1893
Pirongia School	1–8	Coed	Pirongia	State	432 (below average)	337		1897	1897
Pokuru School	1–6	Coed	Pokuru	State	461 (average)	133		1898	1898
Puahue School	1–6	Coed	Puahue	State	425 (few)	148		1902	1902
Pukeatua School	1–8	Coed	Pukeatua	State	464 (average)	83		1903	1903
Roto-o-Rangi School	1–6	Coed	Roto-o-Rangi	State	468 (average)	87		1927	1927
Rukuhia School	1–8	Coed	Rukuhia	State	426 (few)	107		1938	1938
South City Christian School	1–8	Coed	Deanwell	State integrated	380 (fewest)	214		4125	4125
St Patrick's Catholic School	1–8	Coed	Te Awamutu	State integrated	427 (few)	237		1962	1962
St Peter's Catholic School	1–8	Coed	Cambridge	State integrated	399 (fewest)	190		1965	1965
St. Peter's School	7–15	Coed	Cambridge	Private	n/a	1,228		141	141
Te Awamutu College	9–15	Coed	Te Awamutu	State	481 (above average)	1,356		146	146
Te Awamutu Intermediate	7–8	Coed	Te Awamutu	State	479 (above average)	537		2001	2001
Te Awamutu Primary School	1–6	Coed	Te Awamutu	State	461 (average)	552		2002	2002
Te Kura Amorangi o Whakawatea	1–8	Coed	Deanwell	State	520 (many)	117		282	282
Te Miro School	1–8	Coed	Te Miro	State	406 (few)	61		2012	2012
Te Pahu School	1–8	Coed	Te Pahu	State	438 (below average)	95		2013	2013
Te Wharekura o Nga Purapura o te Aroha	1–15	Coed	Te Awamutu	State	505 (many)	93	–	641	641
Waipa Christian School	1–8	Coed	Te Awamutu	State integrated	421 (few)	99		266	266
Wharepapa South School	1–8	Coed	Wharepapa South	State	496 (many)	27		2086	2086

The Church College of New Zealand closed in 2009.

== Ōtorohanga District ==
Name	Years	Gender	Area	Authority	EQI (band)	Roll	Website	MOE	ERO
Arohena School	1–8	Coed	Wharepapa South	State	479 (above average)	20		1688	1688
Hauturu School	1–8	Coed	Hauturu	State	529 (most)	26	-	1736	1736
Kawhia School	1–8	Coed	Kawhia	State	556 (most)	48		1771	1771
Kio Kio School	1–8	Coed	Kio Kio	State	464 (average)	133		1779	1779
Korakonui School	1–8	Coed	Waikeria	State	419 (few)	142		1783	1783
Maihiihi School	1–8	Coed	Maihiihi	State	465 (average)	45		1793	1793
Ngutunui School	1–8	Coed	Puketotara	State	465 (average)	37		1853	1853
Otewa School	1–8	Coed	Otewa	State	483 (above average)	58		1874	1874
Ōtorohanga College	9–15	Coed	Ōtorohanga	State	515 (many)	376		157	157
Ōtorohanga School	1–8	Coed	Ōtorohanga	State	538 (most)	117		1876	1876
Otorohanga South School	1–8	Coed	Ōtorohanga	State	481 (above average)	296		1877	1877
St Mary's Catholic School	1–8	Coed	Ōtorohanga	State integrated	488 (above average)	24	-	1880	1880

== South Waikato District ==
Name	Years	Gender	Area	Authority	Decile	Roll	Website	MOE	ERO
Amisfield School	1–8	Coed	Tokoroa	State	508 (many)	137		1682	1682
Bishop Edward Gaines Catholic School	1–8	Coed	Tokoroa	State integrated	480 (above average)	48		1607	1607
Cargill Open Plan School	1–6	Coed	Tokoroa	State	544 (most)	31		1704	1704
David Henry School	1–6	Coed	Tokoroa	State	527 (most)	138		1708	1708
Forest View High School	9–15	Coed	Tokoroa	State	517 (many)	448		159	159
Kuranui Primary School	1–6	Coed	Okoroire	State	472 (above average)	44		1858	1858
Lichfield School	1–6	Coed	Lichfield	State	457 (average)	82		1790	1790
Pa Harakeke Teen Parent Unit	–	–	Tokoroa	State	569 (most)	n/a	–	639	639
Putaruru College	7–15	Coed	Putāruru	State	518 (many)	419		494	494
Putaruru Primary School	1–6	Coed	Putāruru	State	539 (most)	202		1658	1658
St Mary's Catholic School	1–8	Coed	Putāruru	State integrated	455 (average)	172		1957	1957
Strathmore School	1–6	Coed	Tokoroa	State	530 (most)	177		1968	1968
Tainui Full Primary School	1–8	Coed	Tokoroa	State	526 (most)	248		1974	1974
Te Waotu School	1–8	Coed	Waotu	State	448 (below average)	126		2025	2025
Te Wharekura o Te Kaokaoroa o Pātetere	1–15	Coed	Putāruru	State	523 (most)	295		567	567
Tirau Primary School	1–6	Coed	Tīrau	State	477 (above average)	122		2031	2031
Te Kura Kaupapa Māori o Te Hiringa	1–8	Coed	Tokoroa	State	525 (most)	136		3100	3100
Tokoroa Central School	1–6	Coed	Tokoroa	State	538 (most)	173		2035	2035
Tokoroa High School	9–15	Coed	Tokoroa	State	525 (most)	505		158	158
Tokoroa Intermediate	7–8	Coed	Tokoroa	State	519 (many)	283		2037	2037
Tokoroa North School	1–6	Coed	Tokoroa	State	494 (many)	395		2038	2038

== Waitomo District ==
Name	Years	Gender	Area	Authority	Decile	Roll	Website	MOE	ERO
Aria School	1–6	Coed	Aria	State	461 (average)	42		1687	1687
Benneydale School	1–8	Coed	Benneydale	State	559 (most)	32	-	161	161
Centennial Park School	1–8	Coed	Te Kūiti	State	540 (most)	67		1705	1705
Kinohaku School	1–8	Coed	Taharoa	State	526 (most)	7	-	1778	1778
Mokau School	1–8	Coed	Mokau	State	505 (many)	19		2200	2200
Piopio College	7–15	Coed	Piopio	State	499 (many)	154		162	162
Piopio Primary School	1–6	Coed	Piopio	State	460 (average)	116		1895	1895
Piri Piri School	1–8	Coed	Te Anga	State	490 (above average)	12		1896	1896
Pukenui School	1–8	Coed	Te Kūiti	State	540 (most)	128		1906	1906
Rangitoto School	1–8	Coed	Rangitoto	State	426 (few)	21		1920	1920
St Joseph's Catholic School	1–8	Coed	Te Kūiti	State integrated	449 (average)	62		1953	1953
Te Kuiti High School	9–13	Coed	Te Kūiti	State	522 (most)	315		160	160
Te Kuiti Primary School	1–8	Coed	Te Kūiti	State	489 (above average)	315		2008	2008
Te Kura o Tahaaroa	1–8	Coed	Taharoa	State	510 (many)	26	-	1971	1971
Te Wharekura o Maniapoto	1–15	Coed	Te Kūiti	State	527 (most)	129		1865	1865
Waitomo Caves School	1–8	Coed	Waitomo	State	526 (most)	30		2073	2073
Whareorino School	1–8	Coed	Waikawau	State	525 (most)	8		2267	2267

== Taupo District ==
Name	Years	Area	Authority	Roll	Website	MOE	ERO
Hilltop School	1–8	Hilltop	State	556	-	1740	1740
Kuratau School	1–8	Kuratau	State	89		1785	1785
Lake Taupo Christian School	1–13	Tauhara	State integrated	133	-	1139	1139
Mangakino Area School	1–13	Mangakino	State	45	-	329	329
Marotiri School	1–8	Marotiri	State	168	-	1808	1808
Mountview School	1–8	Taupo Central	State	303	-	1836	1836
Rangitaiki School	1–8	Rangitaiki	State	14		1754	1754
St Patrick's Catholic School	1–8	Nukuhau	State integrated	225		1750	1750
Tauhara College	9–13	Tauhara	State	721		166	166
Tauhara School	1–6	Tauhara	State	233		1984	1984
Taupo Intermediate	7–8	Hilltop	State	498		1988	1988
Taupo School	1–6	Taupo Central	State	433		1989	1989
Taupo-nui-a-Tia College	9–13	Taupo Central	State	1,207		167	167
TKKM o Whakarewa I Te Reo Ki Tuwharetoa	1–13	Taupo Central	State	187	-	4230	4230
Te Kura o Hirangi	1–13	Tūrangi	State	256	-	497	497
Te Kura o Waitahanui	1–6	Waitahanui	State	94	-	2068	2068
Tirohanga School	1–8	Mokai	State	25	-	2032	2032
Tongariro School	1–13	Tūrangi	State	348		476	476
Waipahihi School	1–6	Waipahihi	State	333		2065	2065
Wairakei School	1–6	Wairakei	State	319		2066	2066
Whakamaru School	1–8	Whakamaru	State	75	-	2080	2080
