= Wharepapa South =

Rural community on North Island, New Zealand

- Locality
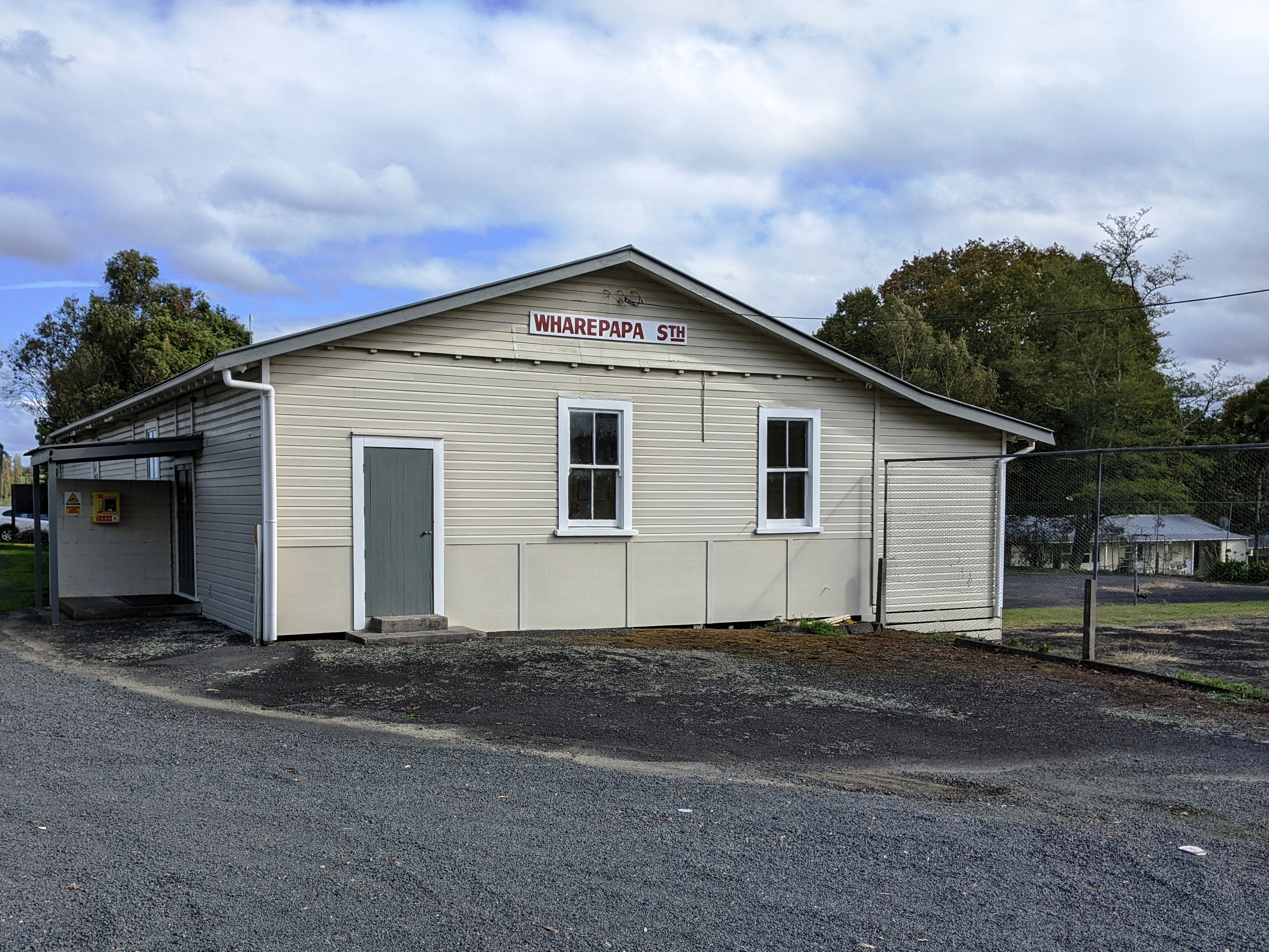
- Wharepapa South community hall
- Interactive map of Wharepapa South
- Coordinates: 38.142°S 175.528°E
- Country: New Zealand
- Region: Waikato
- Territorial authority: Waipā District; Ōtorohanga District
- Ward: Maungatautari General Ward; Wharepuhunga General Ward
- Community: Te Awamutu-Kihikihi Community
- Electorates: Taranaki-King Country; Te Tai Hauāuru (Māori)

Government
  - Territorial Authority: Waipā District Council; Ōtorohanga District Council
  - Regional council: Waikato Regional Council
  - Mayor of Waipa / Mayor of Ōtorohanga: Mike Pettit / Rodney Dow
  - Taranaki-King Country MP: Barbara Kuriger
  - Te Tai Hauāuru MP: Debbie Ngarewa-Packer

Area
  - Total: 201.31 km^{2} (77.73 sq mi)

Population (2023 Census)
  - Total: 465
  - Density: 2.31/km^{2} (5.98/sq mi)
- Postcode: 3880 and 3877

Wharepapa South is a rural community in the Waikato region of New Zealand's North Island. It is split between Waipā District and Ōtorohanga District. It is located west of Tokoroa and east of Ōtorohanga.

== Marae ==
The local Aotearoa Marae and Hoturoa or Rangikawa meeting house is a meeting place for the Ngāti Raukawa hapū of Ngāti Takihiku, and the Waikato Tainui hapū of Ngāti Korokī and Ngāti Raukawa ki Panehākua.

== Demographics ==
Wharepapa South locality covers 201.31 km^{2} (77.73 sq mi). The northern 51.35 km^{2} (19.83 sq mi) is part of the Rotongata statistical area and the southern 149.96 km^{2} (57.90 sq mi) is part of the Puniu statistical area.

Historical population
Year	Pop.	±% p.a.
2006	492	—
2013	495	+0.09%
2018	468	−1.12%
2023	465	−0.13%

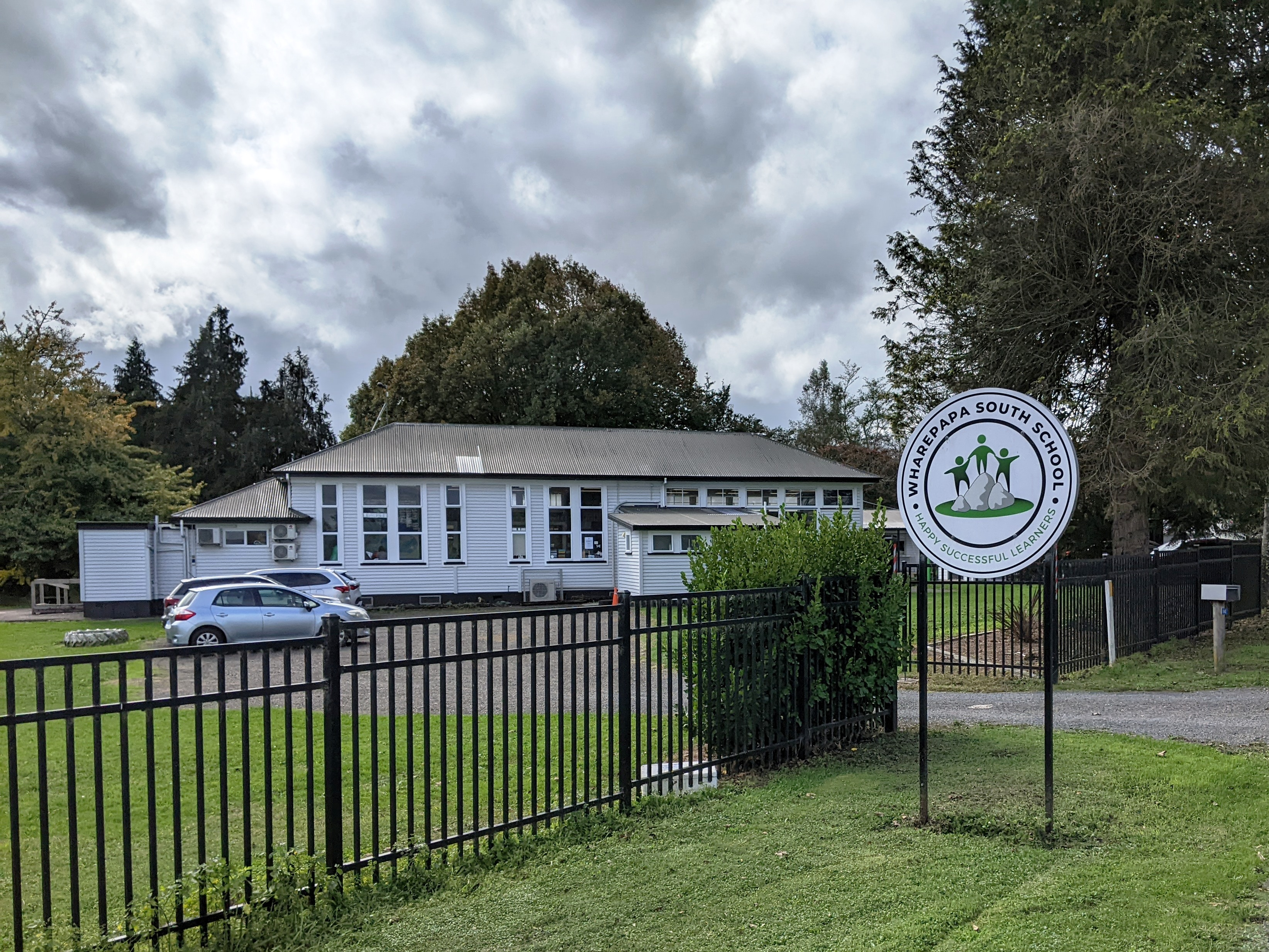
Wharepapa South Primary School

Wharepapa South had a population of 465 in the 2023 New Zealand census, a decrease of 3 people (−0.6%) since the 2018 census, and a decrease of 30 people (−6.1%) since the 2013 census. There were 252 males and 213 females in 171 dwellings. 2.6% of people identified as LGBTIQ+. There were 111 people (23.9%) aged under 15 years, 90 (19.4%) aged 15 to 29, 225 (48.4%) aged 30 to 64, and 33 (7.1%) aged 65 or older.

People could identify as more than one ethnicity. The results were 80.6% European (Pākehā); 16.1% Māori; 1.3% Pasifika; 13.5% Asian; 0.6% Middle Eastern, Latin American and African New Zealanders (MELAA); and 2.6% other, which includes people giving their ethnicity as "New Zealander". English was spoken by 94.8%, Māori by 2.6%, and other languages by 7.7%. No language could be spoken by 1.9% (e.g. too young to talk). The percentage of people born overseas was 21.3, compared with 28.8% nationally.

Religious affiliations were 27.7% Christian, 1.3% Hindu, 0.6% New Age, and 2.6% other religions. People who answered that they had no religion were 58.7%, and 9.0% of people did not answer the census question.

Of those at least 15 years old, 66 (18.6%) people had a bachelor's or higher degree, 204 (57.6%) had a post-high school certificate or diploma, and 84 (23.7%) people exclusively held high school qualifications. 39 people (11.0%) earned over $100,000 compared to 12.1% nationally. The employment status of those at least 15 was 222 (62.7%) full-time, 54 (15.3%) part-time, and 6 (1.7%) unemployed.

== Education ==
Wharepapa South School is a co-educational state primary school, with a roll of 30 as of July 2026. The school opened in 1936, and moved to its current location in 1939.

Arohena School is a Year 1–8 co-educational state primary school, with a roll of 18 as of July 2026. The school opened in 1929.
