= Matangi, New Zealand =

Matangi
- Village
- Location within New Zealand
- Coordinates: 37°49′S 175°25′E
- Country: New Zealand
- Region: Waikato
- District: Waikato
- Wards: Tamahere-Woodlands General Ward; Tai Runga Takiwaa Maaori Ward
- Electorates: Waikato; Hauraki-Waikato (Māori)

Government
  - Territorial Authority: Waikato District Council
  - Regional council: Waikato Regional Council
  - Mayor of Waikato: Aksel Bech
  - Waikato MP: Tim van de Molen
  - Hauraki-Waikato MP: Hana-Rawhiti Maipi-Clarke

Area
  - Territorial: 11.51 km^{2} (4.44 sq mi)
- Elevation: 50 m (160 ft)

Population (2023 census)
  - Territorial: 1,218
  - Density: 105.8/km^{2} (274.1/sq mi)
- Time zone: UTC+12 (NZST)
  - Summer (DST): UTC+13 (NZDT)

Matangi (Māori: Mātangi) is a settlement in the Waikato District on the eastern border of Hamilton. It is surrounded by many lifestyle blocks, but the village centre has Matangi School, a garage, supermarket, takeaway and café, Matangi Hall, St David's church and Matangi recreation reserve.

== Demographics ==
Matangi covers 11.51 km^{2} (4.44 sq mi). Eureka is part of the larger Pukemoremore statistical area.

Historical population
Year	Pop.	±% p.a.
2006	789	—
2013	978	+3.12%
2018	1,101	+2.40%
2023	1,218	+2.04%

Matangi had a population of 1,218 in the 2023 New Zealand census, an increase of 117 people (10.6%) since the 2018 census, and an increase of 240 people (24.5%) since the 2013 census. There were 606 males, 609 females and 6 people of other genders in 399 dwellings. 2.5% of people identified as LGBTIQ+. There were 270 people (22.2%) aged under 15 years, 195 (16.0%) aged 15 to 29, 576 (47.3%) aged 30 to 64, and 165 (13.5%) aged 65 or older.

People could identify as more than one ethnicity. The results were 88.2% European (Pākehā); 13.3% Māori; 1.2% Pasifika; 7.4% Asian; 0.7% Middle Eastern, Latin American and African New Zealanders (MELAA); and 2.5% other, which includes people giving their ethnicity as "New Zealander". English was spoken by 97.5%, Māori language by 1.7%, and other languages by 11.8%. No language could be spoken by 2.0% (e.g. too young to talk). New Zealand Sign Language was known by 0.5%. The percentage of people born overseas was 18.7, compared with 28.8% nationally.

Religious affiliations were 28.3% Christian, 1.2% Hindu, 0.2% Māori religious beliefs, 0.2% Buddhist, 0.5% New Age, and 2.5% other religions. People who answered that they had no religion were 60.1%, and 5.9% of people did not answer the census question.

Of those at least 15 years old, 342 (36.1%) people had a bachelor's or higher degree, 456 (48.1%) had a post-high school certificate or diploma, and 129 (13.6%) people exclusively held high school qualifications. 177 people (18.7%) earned over $100,000 compared to 12.1% nationally. The employment status of those at least 15 was that 552 (58.2%) people were employed full-time, 150 (15.8%) were part-time, and 15 (1.6%) were unemployed.

== Geology ==
The area lies on Matangi soils, formed on the edge of the Komakorau Bog and the Waikato's alluvial plains of sands and gravels.

== History ==
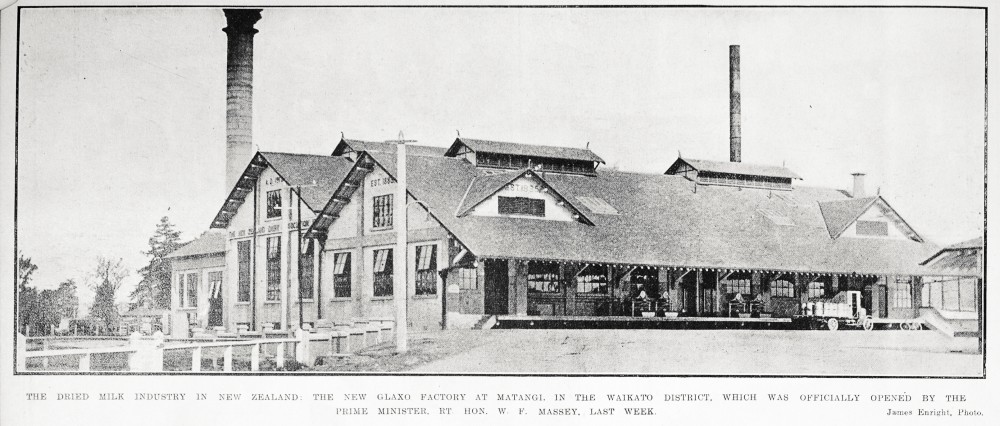
1919 new Matangi Glaxo factory Sir George Grey Special Collections, Auckland Libraries, AWNS-19191120-38-1

The natural vegetation would have been mostly a mixed bush of totara, mataī, rimu, kahikatea, titoki, tawa, and rewarewa. Virtually nothing remains of it. Te Iti o Hauā marae, of Ngāti Haua, Ngāti Paretekawa and Ngāti Ngutu, is 3 km (1.9 mi) east of Matangi on Tauwhare Rd. These original owners lost most of their land to confiscation or sales following the 1860s New Zealand wars.

In 1884, the Cambridge branch opened with a station at Tamahere, renamed Matangi in 1906. A creamery opened in 1885, then cheese factories and, in 1917, they amalgamated to form the New Zealand Dairy Association Group. Further amalgamation followed and in 1919 New Zealand Co-operative Dairy Company Ltd opened its new dairy factory to produce dried milk for Glaxo. At the time it was the largest in the country, able to deal with 25,000 imp gal (110,000 L) a day. It was an early customer of the Central Waikato Electric Power Board in 1921, when 12 local households were also connected. From 1919 until its closure in 1987, the Matangi dairy factory also produced milk powder, condensed milk and cheese. Since the mid-2000s the factory has become the centre of a history precinct, with historic buildings moved in to form a square beside it.

Further rail sidings were added, along with a stationmaster and maintenance crews. In 1902, the first Matangi post office opened and in 1906, a telegram service was added, the school in 1910, bulk stores, marshalling yards and a community hall followed. After closure of the dairy factory, the post office and telephone exchange also closed.

More recently, relaxation of subdivision rules have changed Matangi from a rural community to an area of rural residential development for Hamilton commuters.

== Marae ==
The local marae, Te Iti a Hauā Marae or Tauwhare Marae, is a meeting place of the Ngāti Hauā hapū of Ngāti Te Oro, Ngāti Te Rangitaupi, Ngāti Waenganui and Ngāti Werewere, and is affiliated with Waikato Tainui. It includes the Hauā meeting house.

In October 2020, the Government committed $734,311 from the Provincial Growth Fund to upgrade the marae and 4 other Ngāti Hauā marae, creating 7 jobs.

== Education ==
Matangi School is a co-educational state primary school, with a roll of 186 as of July 2026. The school opened in 1910.
