= Pukeatua =

Locality in Waikato, New Zealand

- Village
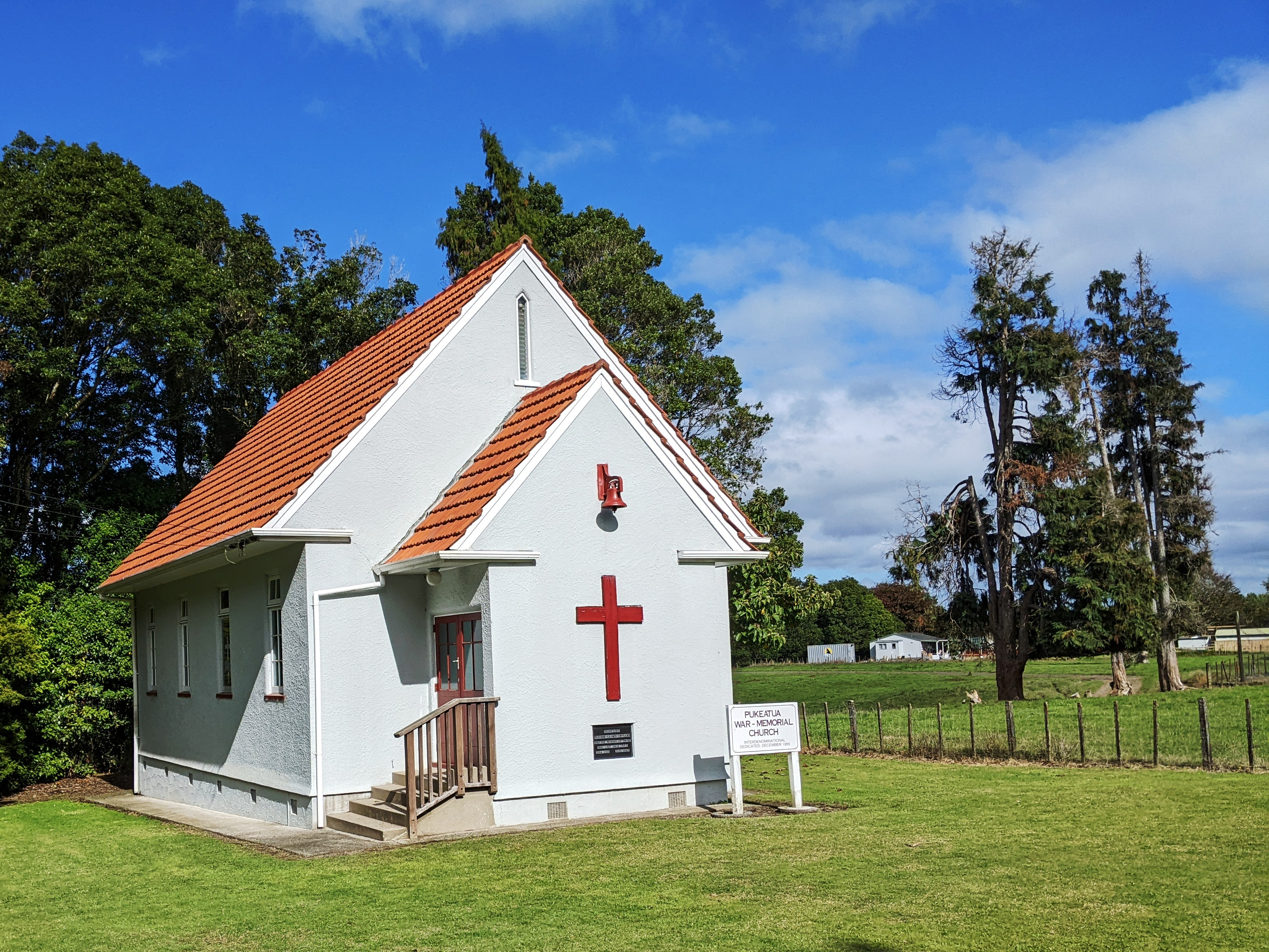
- Pukeatua non-denominational war-memorial church
- Interactive map of Pukeatua
- Coordinates: 38.064366°S 175.557837°E
- Country: New Zealand
- Region: Waikato
- District: Waipā District
- Ward: Pirongia-Kakepuku General Ward
- Community: Te Awamutu-Kihikihi Community
- Electorates: Taranaki-King Country; Te Tai Hauāuru (Māori)

Government
  - Territorial Authority: Waipā District Council
  - Regional council: Waikato Regional Council
  - Mayor of Waipa: Mike Pettit
  - Taranaki-King Country MP: Barbara Kuriger
  - Te Tai Hauāuru MP: Debbie Ngarewa-Packer

Area
  - Territorial: 48.67 km^{2} (18.79 sq mi)

Population (2023 Census)
  - Territorial: 189
  - Density: 3.88/km^{2} (10.1/sq mi)
- Time zone: UTC+12 (NZST)
  - Summer (DST): UTC+13 (NZDT)

Pukeatua is a rural farming community in Waipā District and Waikato region of New Zealand's North Island. It is situated at the south-western foot of the Pukeatua hill, of the Maungatautari mountain range.

The area is west of Tīrau, Putāruru and State Highway 1, and east of Te Awamutu and State Highway 3.

Pukeatua translates as hill of god (puke = hill, atua= god).

== Demographics ==
Pukeatua locality covers 48.67 km^{2} (18.79 sq mi). The locality is part of the larger Rotongata statistical area.

Historical population for Pukeatua locality
Year	Pop.	±% p.a.
2006	135	—
2013	180	+4.20%
2018	168	−1.37%
2023	189	+2.38%

Pukeatua had a population of 189 in the 2023 New Zealand census, an increase of 21 people (12.5%) since the 2018 census, and an increase of 9 people (5.0%) since the 2013 census. There were 99 males and 90 females in 69 dwellings. 1.6% of people identified as LGBTIQ+. The median age was 29.8 years (compared with 38.1 years nationally). There were 42 people (22.2%) aged under 15 years, 51 (27.0%) aged 15 to 29, 78 (41.3%) aged 30 to 64, and 15 (7.9%) aged 65 or older.

People could identify as more than one ethnicity. The results were 77.8% European (Pākehā); 30.2% Māori; 6.3% Asian; 3.2% Middle Eastern, Latin American and African New Zealanders (MELAA); and 3.2% other, which includes people giving their ethnicity as "New Zealander". English was spoken by 96.8%, Māori by 11.1%, and other languages by 7.9%. No language could be spoken by 3.2% (e.g. too young to talk). New Zealand Sign Language was known by 1.6%. The percentage of people born overseas was 12.7, compared with 28.8% nationally.

Religious affiliations were 25.4% Christian, and 9.5% Māori religious beliefs. People who answered that they had no religion were 57.1%, and 9.5% of people did not answer the census question.

Of those at least 15 years old, 21 (14.3%) people had a bachelor's or higher degree, 87 (59.2%) had a post-high school certificate or diploma, and 39 (26.5%) people exclusively held high school qualifications. The median income was $45,900, compared with $41,500 nationally. 15 people (10.2%) earned over $100,000 compared to 12.1% nationally. The employment status of those at least 15 was 87 (59.2%) full-time, 18 (12.2%) part-time, and 3 (2.0%) unemployed.

=== Rotongata statistical area ===
Rotongata statistical area, which also includes Wharepapa South, covers 211.55 km^{2} (81.68 sq mi) and had an estimated population of 1,000 as of June 2025, with a population density of 4.7 people per km^{2}.

Historical population for Rotongata
Year	Pop.	±% p.a.
2006	822	—
2013	819	−0.05%
2018	834	+0.36%
2023	918	+1.94%

Rotongata had a population of 918 in the 2023 New Zealand census, an increase of 84 people (10.1%) since the 2018 census, and an increase of 99 people (12.1%) since the 2013 census. There were 486 males, 429 females, and 3 people of other genders in 321 dwellings. 2.6% of people identified as LGBTIQ+. The median age was 34.7 years (compared with 38.1 years nationally). There were 222 people (24.2%) aged under 15 years, 186 (20.3%) aged 15 to 29, 429 (46.7%) aged 30 to 64, and 84 (9.2%) aged 65 or older.

People could identify as more than one ethnicity. The results were 80.4% European (Pākehā); 20.6% Māori; 2.6% Pasifika; 9.8% Asian; 1.0% Middle Eastern, Latin American and African New Zealanders (MELAA); and 3.3% other, which includes people giving their ethnicity as "New Zealander". English was spoken by 96.4%, Māori by 5.9%, and other languages by 7.5%. No language could be spoken by 2.9% (e.g. too young to talk). New Zealand Sign Language was known by 1.0%. The percentage of people born overseas was 17.3, compared with 28.8% nationally.

Religious affiliations were 28.1% Christian, 0.3% Hindu, 3.3% Māori religious beliefs, 0.3% New Age, and 1.0% other religions. People who answered that they had no religion were 58.5%, and 9.2% of people did not answer the census question.

Of those at least 15 years old, 120 (17.2%) people had a bachelor's or higher degree, 408 (58.6%) had a post-high school certificate or diploma, and 171 (24.6%) people exclusively held high school qualifications. The median income was $46,300, compared with $41,500 nationally. 69 people (9.9%) earned over $100,000 compared to 12.1% nationally. The employment status of those at least 15 was 402 (57.8%) full-time, 102 (14.7%) part-time, and 18 (2.6%) unemployed.

== Education ==
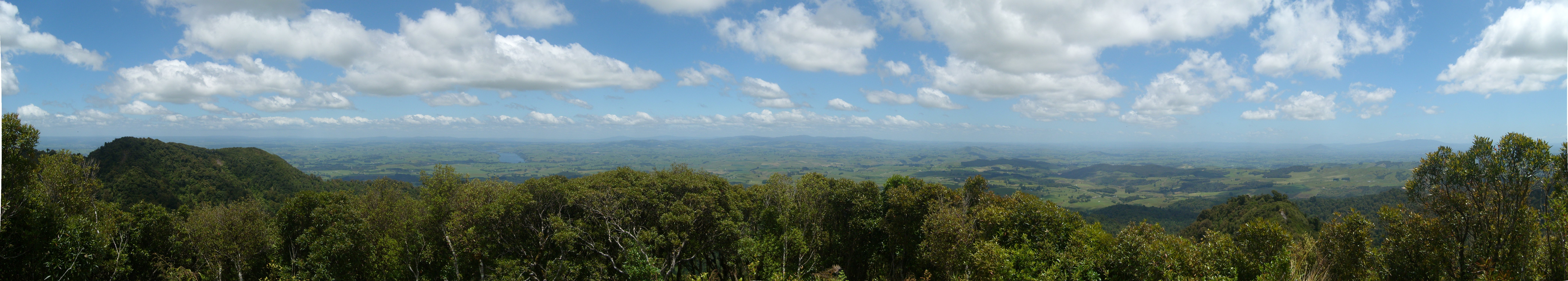
View from Pukeatua Hill

Pukeatua School is a Decile 8 primary school, providing full education for Years 1 to 8. The school has a roll of 96 as of July 2026. The school was founded in 1911.

The village also has a small war memorial church and a playcentre.
