= Fencourt =

Settlement in Waikato, New Zealand

- Village
- Interactive map of Fencourt
- Coordinates: 37.846°S 175.475°E
- Country: New Zealand
- Region: Waikato
- District: Waipā District
- Ward: Cambridge General Ward; Maungatautari General Ward
- Community: Cambridge Community
- Electorates: Waikato; Hauraki-Waikato (Māori)

Government
  - Territorial Authority: Waipā District Council
  - Regional council: Waikato Regional Council
  - Mayor of Waipa: Mike Pettit
  - Waikato MP: Tim van de Molen
  - Hauraki-Waikato MP: Hana-Rawhiti Maipi-Clarke

Area
  - Territorial: 8.37 km^{2} (3.23 sq mi)

Population (2023 Census)
  - Territorial: 267
  - Density: 31.9/km^{2} (82.6/sq mi)
- Time zone: UTC+12 (NZST)
  - Summer (DST): UTC+13 (NZDT)

Fencourt is a rural locality in the Waipā District and Waikato region of New Zealand's North Island.

It is located north of Cambridge

The area was originally the "Fen Court Estate", and was swampy land (fen) provided to soldiers after the 1863–64 Invasion of the Waikato. The land was drained and farmed for sheep and cattle, with gardens and orchards, and a Clydesdale stud. In 1899 it was subdivided into 41 farms.

== Demographics ==
Fencourt settlement and its surrounds cover 8.37 km^{2} (3.23 sq mi). The settlement is part of the larger Fencourt statistical area.

Historical population for Fencourt and surrounds
Year	Pop.	±% p.a.
2006	204	—
2013	246	+2.71%
2018	246	+0.00%
2023	267	+1.65%

Fencourt had a population of 267 in the 2023 New Zealand census, an increase of 21 people (8.5%) since the 2018 census, and an increase of 21 people (8.5%) since the 2013 census. There were 135 males and 129 females in 96 dwellings. The median age was 47.5 years (compared with 38.1 years nationally). There were 45 people (16.9%) aged under 15 years, 45 (16.9%) aged 15 to 29, 111 (41.6%) aged 30 to 64, and 66 (24.7%) aged 65 or older.

People could identify as more than one ethnicity. The results were 91.0% European (Pākehā); 10.1% Māori; 1.1% Pasifika; 2.2% Middle Eastern, Latin American and African New Zealanders (MELAA); and 6.7% other, which includes people giving their ethnicity as "New Zealander". English was spoken by 98.9%, Māori by 2.2%, and other languages by 4.5%. No language could be spoken by 1.1% (e.g. too young to talk). The percentage of people born overseas was 11.2, compared with 28.8% nationally.

Religious affiliations were 32.6% Christian, and 1.1% other religions. People who answered that they had no religion were 56.2%, and 9.0% of people did not answer the census question.

Of those at least 15 years old, 54 (24.3%) people had a bachelor's or higher degree, 114 (51.4%) had a post-high school certificate or diploma, and 45 (20.3%) people exclusively held high school qualifications. The median income was $38,000, compared with $41,500 nationally. 48 people (21.6%) earned over $100,000 compared to 12.1% nationally. The employment status of those at least 15 was 96 (43.2%) full-time, 54 (24.3%) part-time, and 6 (2.7%) unemployed.

=== Fencourt statistical area ===
Fencourt statistical area covers 25.20 km^{2} (9.73 sq mi) and had an estimated population of 760 as of June 2025, with a population density of 30 people per km^{2}.

Historical population for the statistical area
Year	Pop.	±% p.a.
2006	558	—
2013	669	+2.63%
2018	717	+1.40%
2023	756	+1.06%

The statistical area had a population of 756 in the 2023 New Zealand census, an increase of 39 people (5.4%) since the 2018 census, and an increase of 87 people (13.0%) since the 2013 census. There were 381 males, 375 females, and 3 people of other genders in 267 dwellings. 1.2% of people identified as LGBTIQ+. The median age was 46.3 years (compared with 38.1 years nationally). There were 141 people (18.7%) aged under 15 years, 126 (16.7%) aged 15 to 29, 354 (46.8%) aged 30 to 64, and 138 (18.3%) aged 65 or older.

People could identify as more than one ethnicity. The results were 93.3% European (Pākehā); 8.3% Māori; 1.6% Pasifika; 2.8% Asian; 0.8% Middle Eastern, Latin American and African New Zealanders (MELAA); and 4.0% other, which includes people giving their ethnicity as "New Zealander". English was spoken by 98.4%, Māori by 1.2%, and other languages by 7.5%. No language could be spoken by 1.6% (e.g. too young to talk). The percentage of people born overseas was 16.7, compared with 28.8% nationally.

Religious affiliations were 31.7% Christian, 0.8% Islam, and 0.8% other religions. People who answered that they had no religion were 56.3%, and 9.9% of people did not answer the census question.

Of those at least 15 years old, 174 (28.3%) people had a bachelor's or higher degree, 327 (53.2%) had a post-high school certificate or diploma, and 123 (20.0%) people exclusively held high school qualifications. The median income was $46,600, compared with $41,500 nationally. 132 people (21.5%) earned over $100,000 compared to 12.1% nationally. The employment status of those at least 15 was 306 (49.8%) full-time, 147 (23.9%) part-time, and 9 (1.5%) unemployed.

== Education ==
Goodwood School is a coeducational contributing primary school, serving years 1 to 6. It has a roll of 431. The school opened in 1902.
