= Tatuanui =

Locality in Waikato, New Zealand

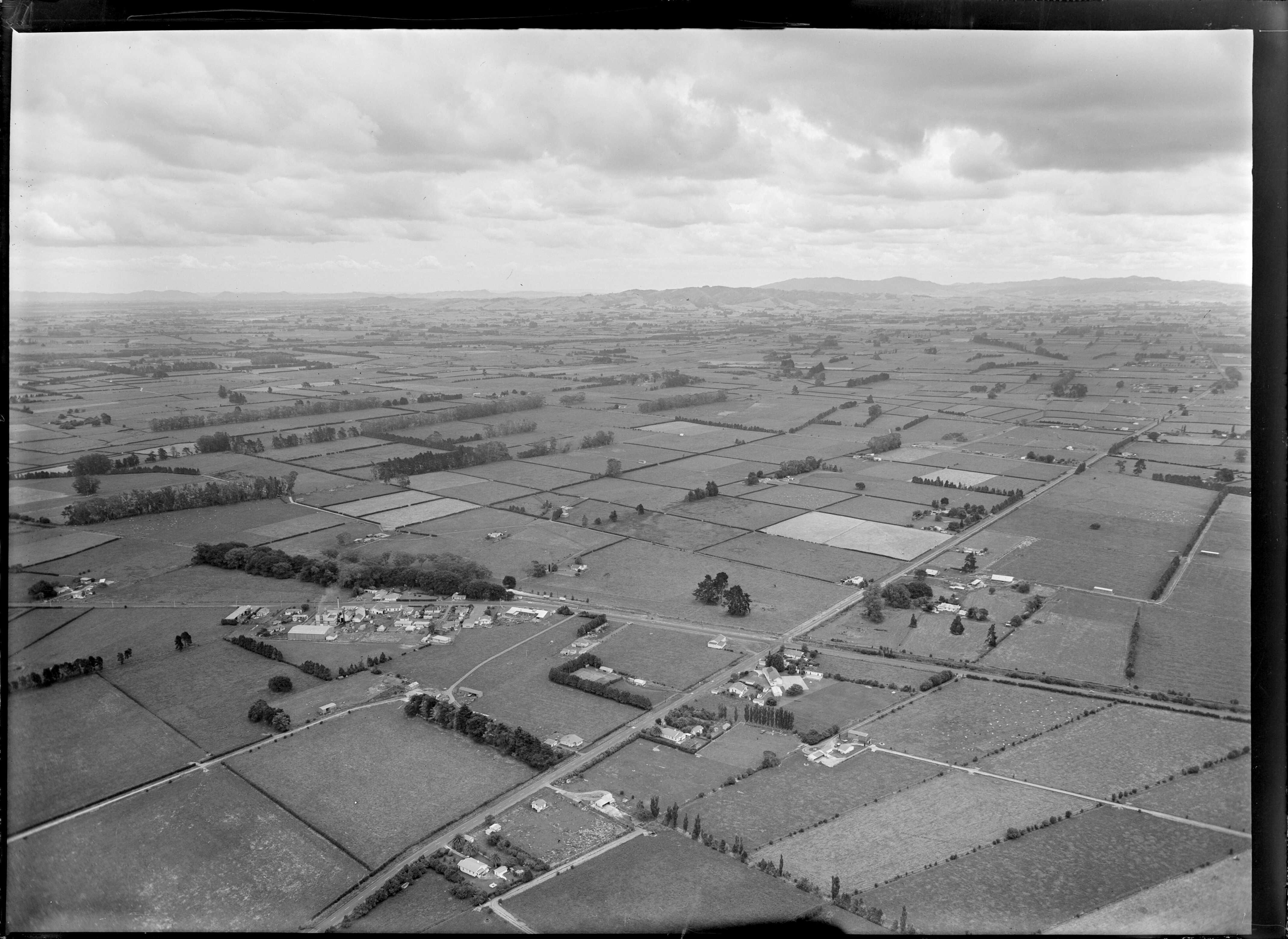
- Aerial view of Tatuanui
- Interactive map of Tatuanui
- Coordinates: 37.621545°S 175.595736°E
- Country: New Zealand
- Region: Waikato
- District: Matamata-Piako District
- Ward: Morrinsville General Ward
- Electorates: Waikato; Hauraki-Waikato (Māori)

Government
  - Territorial Authority: Matamata-Piako District Council
  - Regional council: Waikato Regional Council
  - Mayor of Matamata-Piako: Ash Tanner
  - Waikato MP: Tim van de Molen
  - Hauraki-Waikato MP: Hana-Rawhiti Maipi-Clarke

Area
  - Total: 48.83 km^{2} (18.85 sq mi)

Population (2023 Census)
  - Total: 372
  - Density: 7.62/km^{2} (19.7/sq mi)

Tatuanui is a settlement and rural community in the Matamata-Piako District and Waikato region of New Zealand's North Island.

It is located north-east of Morrinsville, south-west of Te Aroha, Waihou and Waitoa, and north of Ngarua, at the intersection of State Highway 26 and State Highway 27. The intersection was converted to a roundabout between June and December 2011 for safety reasons.

== Etymology ==
Tatuanui was originally known as Tatua-o-Haua, meaning 'belt of Haua'. The name was from a flax belt around where the township stands. The name was shortened to Tatua but was renamed to Tatuanui to avoid confusion with another place.

== History ==
Tatuanui was originally planned as a laid out town with a hall and fire station, although this plan was never carried out.

== Demographics ==
Tatuanui and its surrounds cover 48.83 km^{2} (18.85 sq mi). The community is part of the larger Tatuanui statistical area.

Historical population of Tatuanui and surrounds
Year	Pop.	±% p.a.
2006	453	—
2013	366	−3.00%
2018	387	+1.12%
2023	372	−0.79%

Tatuanui and its surrounds had a population of 372 in the 2023 New Zealand census, a decrease of 15 people (−3.9%) since the 2018 census, and an increase of 6 people (1.6%) since the 2013 census. There were 198 males and 174 females in 132 dwellings. 1.6% of people identified as LGBTIQ+. There were 90 people (24.2%) aged under 15 years, 93 (25.0%) aged 15 to 29, 165 (44.4%) aged 30 to 64, and 27 (7.3%) aged 65 or older.

People could identify as more than one ethnicity. The results were 84.7% European (Pākehā); 11.3% Māori; 3.2% Pasifika; 8.1% Asian; 1.6% Middle Eastern, Latin American and African New Zealanders (MELAA); and 1.6% other, which includes people giving their ethnicity as "New Zealander". English was spoken by 96.8%, Māori language by 3.2%, and other languages by 7.3%. No language could be spoken by 1.6% (e.g. too young to talk). New Zealand Sign Language was known by 0.8%. The percentage of people born overseas was 16.9, compared with 28.8% nationally.

Religious affiliations were 25.8% Christian, 1.6% Hindu, and 1.6% other religions. People who answered that they had no religion were 62.1%, and 8.1% of people did not answer the census question.

Of those at least 15 years old, 60 (21.3%) people had a bachelor's or higher degree, 162 (57.4%) had a post-high school certificate or diploma, and 57 (20.2%) people exclusively held high school qualifications. 36 people (12.8%) earned over $100,000 compared to 12.1% nationally. The employment status of those at least 15 was that 162 (57.4%) people were employed full-time, 57 (20.2%) were part-time, and 9 (3.2%) were unemployed.

=== Tatuanui statistical area ===
Tatuanui statistical area covers 144.46 km^{2} (55.78 sq mi) and had an estimated population of 1,530 as of June 2025, with a population density of 10.6 people per km^{2}.

Historical population of Tatuanui statistical area
Year	Pop.	±% p.a.
2006	1,479	—
2013	1,338	−1.42%
2018	1,377	+0.58%
2023	1,455	+1.11%

The statistical area had a population of 1,455 in the 2023 New Zealand census, an increase of 78 people (5.7%) since the 2018 census, and an increase of 117 people (8.7%) since the 2013 census. There were 750 males and 705 females in 492 dwellings. 1.4% of people identified as LGBTIQ+. The median age was 33.8 years (compared with 38.1 years nationally). There were 339 people (23.3%) aged under 15 years, 294 (20.2%) aged 15 to 29, 633 (43.5%) aged 30 to 64, and 192 (13.2%) aged 65 or older.

People could identify as more than one ethnicity. The results were 82.9% European (Pākehā); 17.5% Māori; 1.6% Pasifika; 7.8% Asian; 1.2% Middle Eastern, Latin American and African New Zealanders (MELAA); and 2.1% other, which includes people giving their ethnicity as "New Zealander". English was spoken by 97.7%, Māori language by 4.9%, and other languages by 6.8%. No language could be spoken by 2.1% (e.g. too young to talk). New Zealand Sign Language was known by 0.2%. The percentage of people born overseas was 13.2, compared with 28.8% nationally.

Religious affiliations were 28.0% Christian, 1.2% Hindu, 0.8% Islam, 0.6% Māori religious beliefs, 0.4% Buddhist, 0.4% New Age, and 1.2% other religions. People who answered that they had no religion were 57.5%, and 9.5% of people did not answer the census question.

Of those at least 15 years old, 177 (15.9%) people had a bachelor's or higher degree, 663 (59.4%) had a post-high school certificate or diploma, and 273 (24.5%) people exclusively held high school qualifications. The median income was $51,700, compared with $41,500 nationally. 138 people (12.4%) earned over $100,000 compared to 12.1% nationally. The employment status of those at least 15 was that 618 (55.4%) people were employed full-time, 207 (18.5%) were part-time, and 15 (1.3%) were unemployed.

== Dairy industry ==
=== Dairy factory ===
The Tatua Co-operative Dairy Company is a central feature of the township. Tatua is an independent co-operative dairy company owned by 101 shareholder farms, all located within a 12 kilometre radius of the processing site. It employs 400 staff and exports specialised dairy products worldwide.

The co-operative has maintained a strong independent history within the New Zealand dairy industry. In the 2001 mega-merger for the New Zealand dairy industry which formed Fonterra, Tatua shareholders decided to remain independent. New Zealand had over 500 dairy co-operatives in the 1930s, but Tatua is the only New Zealand dairy co-operative remaining that has never been part of any merger throughout its history.

Tatua often records the highest payout for milk solids to the farmer shareholders in New Zealand. While the high level of payout is partly due to a small catchment area (which reduces processing costs), the high financial performance of Tatua has been attributed to its focus on value-added dairy products rather than traditional, mass-produced, commodity-based milk products such as milk powder, butter and cheese.

=== Dairy Whip can ===
A giant model of a can of whipped cream sits outside the factory as an landmark for the township. The 12-metre-high stainless steel silo was rebranded as Tatua Dairy Whip in 2013. It was severely crumpled in 2016, but the cause of the damage remained a mystery.

The model was replaced again later that year, and underwent a further makeover in 2019.

=== Farming ===
The area's sandy and silty soil makes it vulnerable to pugging and soil compaction.

The Ministry for Primary Industries held a public meeting in the township in October 2019 following several new Waikato cases of the cattle disease Mycoplasma bovis.

== Sports and facilities ==
The local tennis club began in 1921 and was formally incorporated in 1934. The club caters for players as young as 6.

The township has a hall available for community events.

== Education ==
Tatuanui School is a co-educational state primary school for Year 1 to 6 students, with a roll of 139 as of July 2026. It was established in 1918 and celebrated its centenary in October 2018.

The school buildings, drains and playground were built by volunteers from the local community, and caretaking activities have traditionally been done at parent working bees and by students during class time.
