= Roto-o-Rangi =

Locality in Waikato, New Zealand

- Village
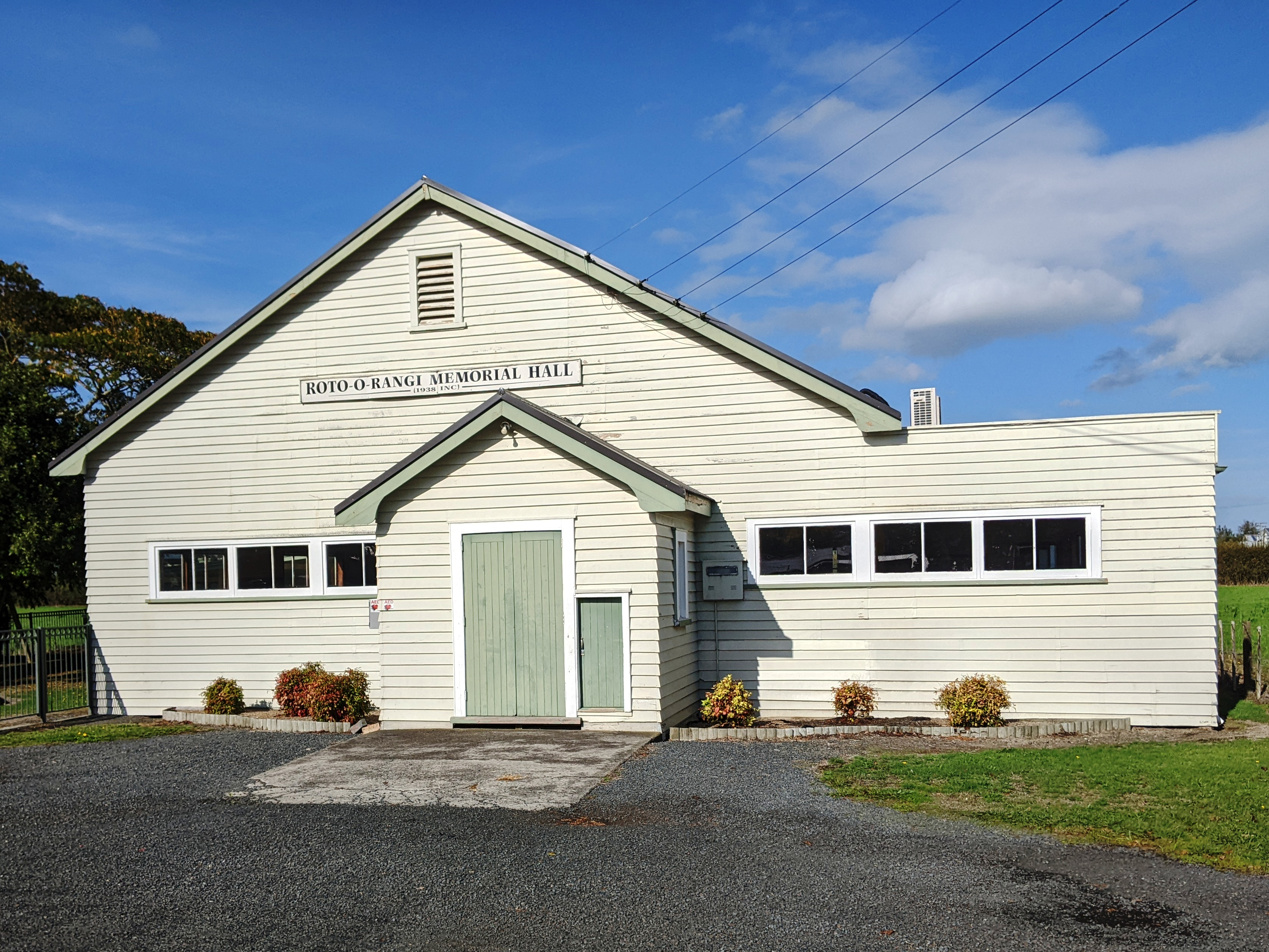
- Roto-o-Rangi Memorial Hall
- Interactive map of Roto-o-Rangi
- Coordinates: 37.979°S 175.460°E
- Country: New Zealand
- Region: Waikato
- District: Waipā District
- Ward: Maungatautari General Ward
- Community: Cambridge Community
- Electorates: Taupō; Hauraki-Waikato (Māori)

Government
  - Territorial Authority: Waipā District Council
  - Regional council: Waikato Regional Council
  - Mayor of Waipa: Mike Pettit
  - Taupō MP: Louise Upston
  - Hauraki-Waikato MP: Hana-Rawhiti Maipi-Clarke

Area
  - Territorial: 35.24 km^{2} (13.61 sq mi)

Population (2023 Census)
  - Territorial: 363
  - Density: 10.3/km^{2} (26.7/sq mi)
- Time zone: UTC+12 (NZST)
  - Summer (DST): UTC+13 (NZDT)

Roto-o-Rangi or Rotoorangi is a rural community in the Waipā District and Waikato region of New Zealand's North Island, located south of Cambridge and north-east of Te Awamutu.

Parts of northern Roto-o-Rangi have been undergoing urban development since the construction of the State Highway 1 Cambridge Expressway, as part of the expansion of Cambridge. The rest of Roto-o-Rangi is sparely populated with a small number of homes and businesses, including a furniture shop run out of a converted dairy farm barnhouse.

Roto-o-rangi translates to Lake of Heaven, referring to a lake that once covered the area.

== History ==
=== European settlement ===
A European farmer and three of his workers arrived in 1864 and drained the lake to create rolling farm, under a lease agreement with local Māori that some Māori did not agree to.

The area became the site of conflict during the Waikato War. A fortification was built to accommodate 60 men on the main road between Cambridge and Te Awamutu. The last recorded European death from the war was farm worker Tim Sullivan on 24 April 1873; the pocket knife he had been carrying shortly before his death is on display at Cambridge Museum.

=== Modern history ===
The Gricelands cream skimming factory was built at Roto-o-rangi in 1903. Settlers had to build their own roads to the factory. A Cambridge-based teacher and post-master opened a school in the settlement two years later, in February 1905, sending children home once a week with letters from their parents.

The Roto-o-Rangi Memorial Hall was opened on 8 September 1938, following a fundraising campaign by the local community. A supper room was added in 1949, and the hall was expanded with a new roof in 1958.

The hall has been a venue for many community events. Dances were held at the hall through the decades, with women usually outnumbering men. The local school, Country Women's Institute, Federated Farmers, Young Farmers Club, Playcentre, The Ping Pong Club, Indoor Bowls, Tennis Club, church groups, jazz musicians, ballet classes and politicians have also used the hall for events.

Roto O Rangi Road has recently been the site of fatal crashes.

== Demographics ==
Roto-o-Rangi locality covers 35.24 km^{2} (13.61 sq mi). The locality is part of the larger Rotoorangi statistical area.

Historical population for Roto-o-Rangi and surrounds
Year	Pop.	±% p.a.
2006	273	—
2013	294	+1.06%
2018	345	+3.25%
2023	363	+1.02%

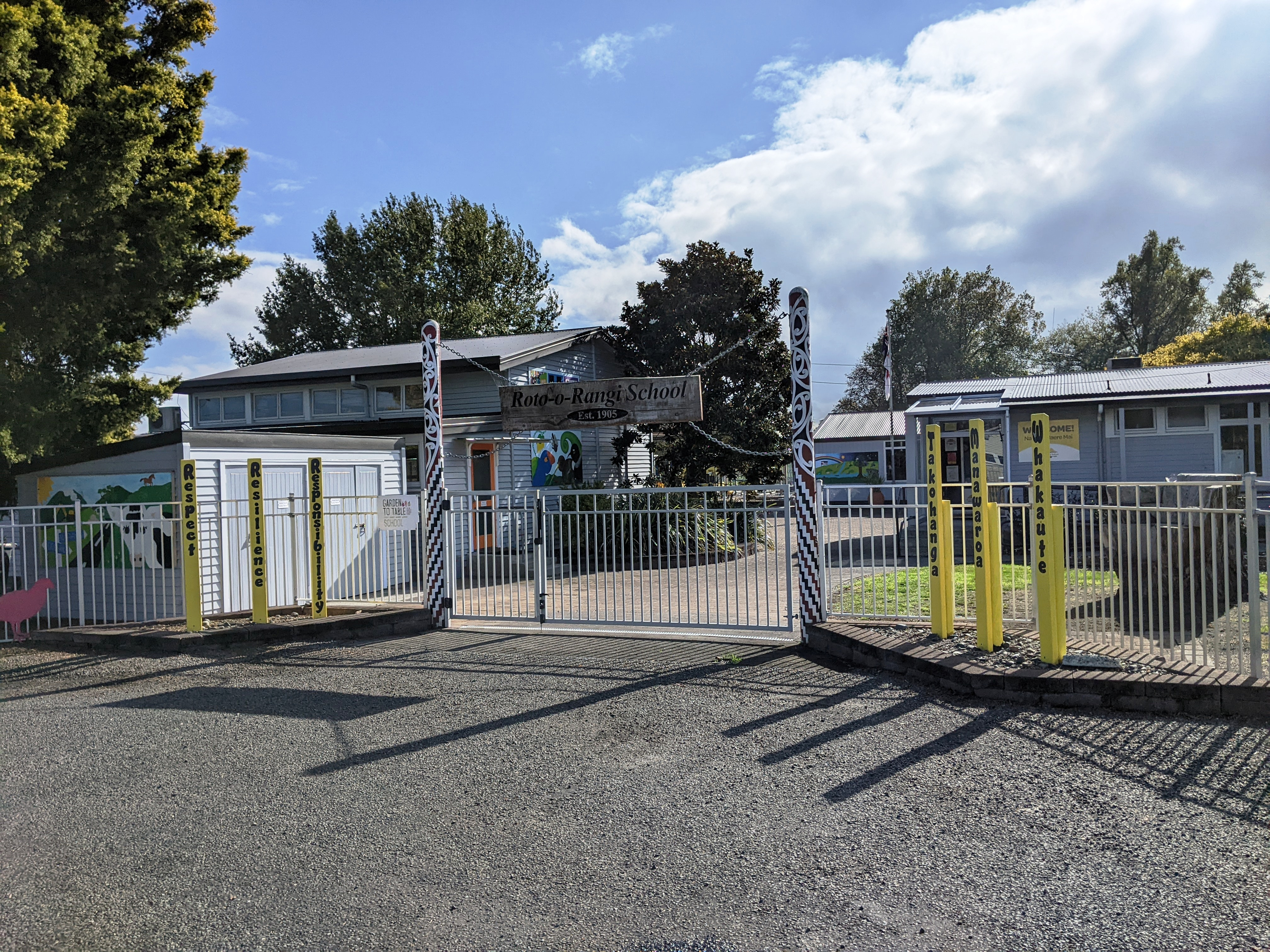
Roto-o-Rangi Primary School

Roto-o-Rangi locality had a population of 363 in the 2023 New Zealand census, an increase of 18 people (5.2%) since the 2018 census, and an increase of 69 people (23.5%) since the 2013 census. There were 183 males and 180 females in 129 dwellings. 1.7% of people identified as LGBTIQ+. There were 93 people (25.6%) aged under 15 years, 54 (14.9%) aged 15 to 29, 177 (48.8%) aged 30 to 64, and 42 (11.6%) aged 65 or older.

People could identify as more than one ethnicity. The results were 90.9% European (Pākehā), 9.1% Māori, 1.7% Pasifika, 5.0% Asian, and 5.0% other, which includes people giving their ethnicity as "New Zealander". English was spoken by 98.3%, Māori by 1.7%, and other languages by 5.0%. No language could be spoken by 0.8% (e.g. too young to talk). New Zealand Sign Language was known by 1.7%. The percentage of people born overseas was 16.5, compared with 28.8% nationally.

Religious affiliations were 25.6% Christian, 1.7% Māori religious beliefs, 0.8% New Age, and 2.5% other religions. People who answered that they had no religion were 64.5%, and 6.6% of people did not answer the census question.

Of those at least 15 years old, 60 (22.2%) people had a bachelor's or higher degree, 156 (57.8%) had a post-high school certificate or diploma, and 57 (21.1%) people exclusively held high school qualifications. 36 people (13.3%) earned over $100,000 compared to 12.1% nationally. The employment status of those at least 15 was 177 (65.6%) full-time and 42 (15.6%) part-time.

=== Rotoorangi statistical area ===
Rotoorangi statistical area, which also includes Rangiaowhia, covers 183.38 km^{2} (70.80 sq mi). It had an estimated population of 1,890 as of June 2025, with a population density of 10.3 people per km^{2}.

Historical population for Rotoorangi statistical area
Year	Pop.	±% p.a.
2006	1,401	—
2013	1,602	+1.93%
2018	1,737	+1.63%
2023	1,770	+0.38%
The 2006 population is for a smaller area of 182.15 km^{2}. Source:

Rotoorangi statistical area had a population of 1,770 in the 2023 New Zealand census, an increase of 33 people (1.9%) since the 2018 census, and an increase of 168 people (10.5%) since the 2013 census. There were 912 males and 855 females in 645 dwellings. 1.9% of people identified as LGBTIQ+. The median age was 39.4 years (compared with 38.1 years nationally). There were 393 people (22.2%) aged under 15 years, 273 (15.4%) aged 15 to 29, 831 (46.9%) aged 30 to 64, and 273 (15.4%) aged 65 or older.

People could identify as more than one ethnicity. The results were 89.8% European (Pākehā); 14.7% Māori; 1.2% Pasifika; 3.9% Asian; 0.2% Middle Eastern, Latin American and African New Zealanders (MELAA); and 3.2% other, which includes people giving their ethnicity as "New Zealander". English was spoken by 97.1%, Māori by 2.5%, and other languages by 5.6%. No language could be spoken by 2.0% (e.g. too young to talk). New Zealand Sign Language was known by 0.5%. The percentage of people born overseas was 14.7, compared with 28.8% nationally.

Religious affiliations were 29.5% Christian, 0.2% Hindu, 0.3% Islam, 0.5% Māori religious beliefs, 0.8% Buddhist, 0.2% New Age, and 1.2% other religions. People who answered that they had no religion were 58.8%, and 8.5% of people did not answer the census question.

Of those at least 15 years old, 267 (19.4%) people had a bachelor's or higher degree, 780 (56.6%) had a post-high school certificate or diploma, and 318 (23.1%) people exclusively held high school qualifications. The median income was $50,300, compared with $41,500 nationally. 195 people (14.2%) earned over $100,000 compared to 12.1% nationally. The employment status of those at least 15 was 804 (58.4%) full-time, 228 (16.6%) part-time, and 21 (1.5%) unemployed.

== Education ==
Roto-o-Rangi School is a state primary school for Year 1 to 6 students, with a roll of 89. It opened in 1905.

Puahue School, another state primary school for Year 1 to 6 students, is located southeast of the township. It has a roll of 153. The school opened in 1912.

Both schools are co-educational. Rolls are as of July 2026.
