= Manawaru =

Settlement in Waikato, New Zealand

- Interactive map of Manawaru
- Coordinates: 37.633259°S 175.764808°E
- Country: New Zealand
- Region: Waikato
- District: Matamata-Piako District
- Ward: Te Aroha General Ward
- Electorates: Waikato; Hauraki-Waikato (Māori)

Government
  - Territorial Authority: Matamata-Piako District Council
  - Regional council: Waikato Regional Council
  - Mayor of Matamata-Piako: Ash Tanner
  - Waikato MP: Tim van de Molen
  - Hauraki-Waikato MP: Hana-Rawhiti Maipi-Clarke

Area
  - Total: 11.71 km^{2} (4.52 sq mi)

Population (2023 Census)
  - Total: 123
  - Density: 10.5/km^{2} (27.2/sq mi)

Manawaru or Manawarū is a rural community in the Matamata-Piako District and Waikato region of New Zealand's North Island.

It is located south-east of Te Aroha and north-east of Ngarua, and includes part of the Waihou River and some of the foothills of the Kaimai Ranges.

It features a bible chapel, a school, a Playcentre for early childhood education, and a community hall that can accommodate up to 200 people.

== Demographics ==
Manawaru and its surrounds cover 11.71 km^{2} (4.52 sq mi). The SA1 area is part of the larger Waihou-Manawaru statistical area.

Historical population of Manawaru and surrounds
Year	Pop.	±% p.a.
2006	117	—
2013	108	−1.14%
2018	114	+1.09%
2023	123	+1.53%

Manawaru had a population of 123 in the 2023 New Zealand census, an increase of 9 people (7.9%) since the 2018 census, and an increase of 15 people (13.9%) since the 2013 census. There were 63 males and 60 females in 42 dwellings. 2.4% of people identified as LGBTIQ+. The median age was 39.0 years (compared with 38.1 years nationally). There were 24 people (19.5%) aged under 15 years, 18 (14.6%) aged 15 to 29, 69 (56.1%) aged 30 to 64, and 12 (9.8%) aged 65 or older.

People could identify as more than one ethnicity. The results were 82.9% European (Pākehā); 7.3% Māori; 4.9% Pasifika; 9.8% Asian; and 2.4% Middle Eastern, Latin American and African New Zealanders (MELAA). English was spoken by 92.7%, Māori language by 2.4%, and other languages by 12.2%. No language could be spoken by 2.4% (e.g. too young to talk). The percentage of people born overseas was 24.4, compared with 28.8% nationally.

Religious affiliations were 31.7% Christian, and 2.4% Buddhist. People who answered that they had no religion were 63.4%, and 4.9% of people did not answer the census question.

Of those at least 15 years old, 18 (18.2%) people had a bachelor's or higher degree, 54 (54.5%) had a post-high school certificate or diploma, and 21 (21.2%) people exclusively held high school qualifications. The median income was $39,800, compared with $41,500 nationally. 6 people (6.1%) earned over $100,000 compared to 12.1% nationally. The employment status of those at least 15 was that 51 (51.5%) people were employed full-time, 18 (18.2%) were part-time, and 3 (3.0%) were unemployed.

=== Waihou-Manawaru statistical area ===
The Waihou-Manawaru statistical area, which also includes Waihou, covers 140.79 km^{2} (54.36 sq mi) and had an estimated population of 1,340 as of June 2025, with a population density of 9.5 people per km^{2}.

Historical population for Waihou-Manawaru
Year	Pop.	±% p.a.
2006	1,170	—
2013	1,131	−0.48%
2018	1,209	+1.34%
2023	1,278	+1.12%

Waihou-Manawaru had a population of 1,278 in the 2023 New Zealand census, an increase of 69 people (5.7%) since the 2018 census, and an increase of 147 people (13.0%) since the 2013 census. There were 669 males, 609 females and 3 people of other genders in 465 dwellings. 2.3% of people identified as LGBTIQ+. The median age was 39.8 years (compared with 38.1 years nationally). There were 258 people (20.2%) aged under 15 years, 216 (16.9%) aged 15 to 29, 600 (46.9%) aged 30 to 64, and 204 (16.0%) aged 65 or older.

People could identify as more than one ethnicity. The results were 86.2% European (Pākehā); 15.5% Māori; 3.3% Pasifika; 7.0% Asian; 0.9% Middle Eastern, Latin American and African New Zealanders (MELAA); and 1.4% other, which includes people giving their ethnicity as "New Zealander". English was spoken by 95.8%, Māori language by 1.9%, Samoan by 0.2%, and other languages by 8.2%. No language could be spoken by 3.1% (e.g. too young to talk). New Zealand Sign Language was known by 0.2%. The percentage of people born overseas was 14.8, compared with 28.8% nationally.

Religious affiliations were 29.1% Christian, 0.9% Hindu, 0.7% Māori religious beliefs, 0.7% Buddhist, 0.9% New Age, and 2.6% other religions. People who answered that they had no religion were 55.2%, and 10.1% of people did not answer the census question.

Of those at least 15 years old, 129 (12.6%) people had a bachelor's or higher degree, 600 (58.8%) had a post-high school certificate or diploma, and 297 (29.1%) people exclusively held high school qualifications. The median income was $36,000, compared with $41,500 nationally. 78 people (7.6%) earned over $100,000 compared to 12.1% nationally. The employment status of those at least 15 was that 540 (52.9%) people were employed full-time, 156 (15.3%) were part-time, and 21 (2.1%) were unemployed.

== History ==
In 1897, the New Zealand Dairy Association established Te Aroha creamery under the leadership of former Cornish bricklayer Samuel Whitburn. Two years later, Whitburn relocated the operation to Manawaru.

The Manawaru Creamery was able to process up to 500 gallons per hour. By the 1900 dairy season it had fifteen suppliers and was processing the milk of about 400 cows. Cream was sent every day to Te Aroha railway station, where it was transported to Ngāruawāhia.

In 1902, Manawaru was an established farming community receiving bi-weekly mail. One of the settlers at this time, Henry Osborne, was born in Geelong and had lived in various places in Victoria, New South Wales and Waikato before he started farming in Manawaru in 1900.

There is a Roll of Honour at the Manawarū Hall to commemorate the 54 local men who served overseas during the Second World War. It also includes a wooden tablet inset with the photographs of the four local men who died in action.

== Education ==
Manawaru School is a co-educational state primary school for Year 1 to 8 students, with a roll of 76 as of July 2026.

The school was established in 1900 and celebrated its 75th jubilee in 1975.

=== School gates ===
Memorial gates were erected at the school in 2000.

The left pillar bears a plaque for locals who served in overseas wars:

Manawaru remembers

those who served

and those whose lives were lost

in defence of our freedoms.

Lest we forget.

The right pillar has a plaque, dedicated to the first European settlers to the area:

In honoured memory

The pioneer settlers

of

Manawaru 1900-2000.
