= Hautapu =

Settlement in Waikato, New Zealand

- Village
- Interactive map of Hautapu
- Coordinates: 37.861811°S 175.454812°E
- Country: New Zealand
- Region: Waikato
- District: Waipā District
- Ward: Cambridge General Ward
- Community: Cambridge Community
- Electorates: Taupō; Hauraki-Waikato (Māori)

Government
  - Territorial Authority: Waipā District Council
  - Regional council: Waikato Regional Council
  - Mayor of Waipa: Mike Pettit
  - Taupō MP: Louise Upston
  - Hauraki-Waikato MP: Hana-Rawhiti Maipi-Clarke

Area
  - Territorial: 22.14 km^{2} (8.55 sq mi)

Population (June 2025)
  - Territorial: 1,490
  - Density: 67.3/km^{2} (174/sq mi)
- Time zone: UTC+12 (NZST)
  - Summer (DST): UTC+13 (NZDT)

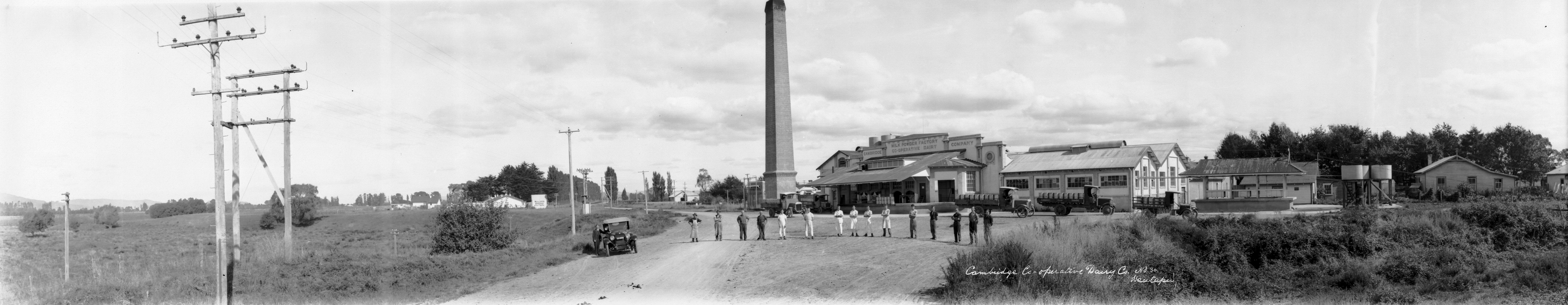
Cambridge Co-operative Dairy Co, Hautapu, between 1923-1928

Hautapu is a township in the Waipa District and Waikato region of New Zealand's North Island, located just north of Cambridge across State Highway 1.

The area was identified as the Hautapu Parish on a militia farm map published in 1864 during the Waikato War, named after the Hautapu Rapids which previously occupied the site of the current Karapiro Power Station. The Hautapu Cemetery was established in June 1866.

A Fonterra dairy factory is a key feature of the township. The factory was proposed in August 1884 and began processing milk on 20 December 1884 as the Cambridge Produce and Dairy Factory. In 1886, the factory was sold to new owners and was expanded to produce butter, cheese and bacon after running into problems with milk supplies. In 1901, it was sold to a new dairy co-operative which replaced the factory with a new brick factory in 1908. The factory began specialising in cheese in 1915, and came under the ownership of the new national dairy co-operative in 1919.

Jas Taylor was one of the first and most significant early settlers; several others followed as the area became more densely populated between the 1910s and 1930s. This trend then reversed, as smaller farms consolidated into larger farms.

A 56.7-hectare (140-acre) industrial plant is being developed at Hautapu between 2019 and 2024, which is expected to employ 1150 jobs once completed. Most of these jobs will be at a new 44m² ALP aluminium factory being constructed to replace a 1970s plant in Te Rapa, once of the largest factories ever built in New Zealand.

The township has its own rugby, netball and hockey club. The rugby club plays in a local tournament with other local town clubs.

There is a Returned and Services' Association memorial in the town, listing people from Cambridge killed during the Boer War, World War I and World War II. Ten World War I casualties and two World War II casualties are buried at the local cemetery.

== Demographics ==
Hautapu covers 22.14 km^{2} (8.55 sq mi) and had an estimated population of 1,490 as of June 2025, with a population density of 67 people per km^{2}.

Historical population
Year	Pop.	±% p.a.
2006	990	—
2013	1,206	+2.86%
2018	1,173	−0.55%
2023	1,299	+2.06%

Hautapu had a population of 1,299 in the 2023 New Zealand census, an increase of 126 people (10.7%) since the 2018 census, and an increase of 93 people (7.7%) since the 2013 census. There were 630 males and 666 females in 480 dwellings. 1.8% of people identified as LGBTIQ+. There were 204 people (15.7%) aged under 15 years, 225 (17.3%) aged 15 to 29, 531 (40.9%) aged 30 to 64, and 339 (26.1%) aged 65 or older.

People could identify as more than one ethnicity. The results were 91.0% European (Pākehā); 8.1% Māori; 2.1% Pasifika; 5.1% Asian; 0.5% Middle Eastern, Latin American and African New Zealanders (MELAA); and 2.3% other, which includes people giving their ethnicity as "New Zealander". English was spoken by 98.2%, Māori language by 1.2%, and other languages by 7.4%. No language could be spoken by 1.2% (e.g. too young to talk). New Zealand Sign Language was known by 0.2%. The percentage of people born overseas was 20.6, compared with 28.8% nationally.

Religious affiliations were 31.9% Christian, 0.9% Hindu, 0.2% Jewish, and 1.6% other religions. People who answered that they had no religion were 56.6%, and 8.3% of people did not answer the census question.

Of those at least 15 years old, 240 (21.9%) people had a bachelor's or higher degree, 621 (56.7%) had a post-high school certificate or diploma, and 234 (21.4%) people exclusively held high school qualifications. 171 people (15.6%) earned over $100,000 compared to 12.1% nationally. The employment status of those at least 15 was that 516 (47.1%) people were employed full-time, 162 (14.8%) were part-time, and 9 (0.8%) were unemployed.

Individual statistical areas
Name	Area (km^{2})	Population	Density (per km^{2})	Dwellings	Median age	Median income
Hautapu Rural	14.71	687	47	270	46.4 years	$46,200
Hautapu	7.43	612	82	210	46.1 years	$37,000
New Zealand					38.1 years	$41,500

Hautapu statistical area is within the Cambridge urban area and Hautapu Rural is outside it.

== Education ==
Hautapu School is a co-educational state primary school for Year 1 to 8 students, with a roll of 202 as of July 2026.

The school board was established in January 1876 and teacher Rev McLaurin began classes in March 1877. The school was relocated in 1884, and new school was built at another more central site in 1910. The school was enlarged again three times between 1918 and 1953.

== See also ==
Category:Burials at Hautapu Cemetery
