= Every Maclean =

New Zealand politician (1819–1901)

Thomas Every Maclean (1819 – 11 August 1901) was a 19th-century New Zealand politician and farmer.

Thomas Every Maclean was born in 1819 in Cornwall. He came to New Zealand in the 1850s. For the Invasion of the Waikato, he raised a corps that became known as the Howick Cavalry Volunteers; Maclean was the corps' captain.

Maclean was elected to Auckland Provincial Council for the Franklin electorate in November 1865 and served until September 1872. He was the 6th Deputy-Superintendent of Auckland Province (July to August 1868, and July 1869 to June 1870).

He was a member of the New Zealand Legislative Council; he was appointed on 11 July 1873, and his membership lapsed on 15 June 1876 due to absence. He found that he did not have enough time for sessions of the Legislative Council in Wellington.

Together with his brother Robert, Maclean farmed in Pakuranga. In 1868 or 1869 (sources differ), they were the first to import Hereford cattle into New Zealand. The first Hereford sire was called Lord Lovell. The Maclean brothers lived at Bleak House in Howick; Bleakhouse Road in the suburbs of Mellons Bay and Howick commemorates the name.

Every Maclean shifted his interests to farming at Fencourt in the Waikato, in partnership with Thomas Russell and James Williamson. Initially known as Maclean and Co., their enterprise was later known as the Auckland Agricultural Company. When James Bailey took up the management of that company at Fencourt in c. 1891, Maclean returned to Howick.

Maclean died at Bleak House on 11 August 1901. Later on he and his family had a school named after them built on their family-owned farm called Macleans College.
