= Maungatautari (community) =

Rural community in Waikato, New Zealand

- Village
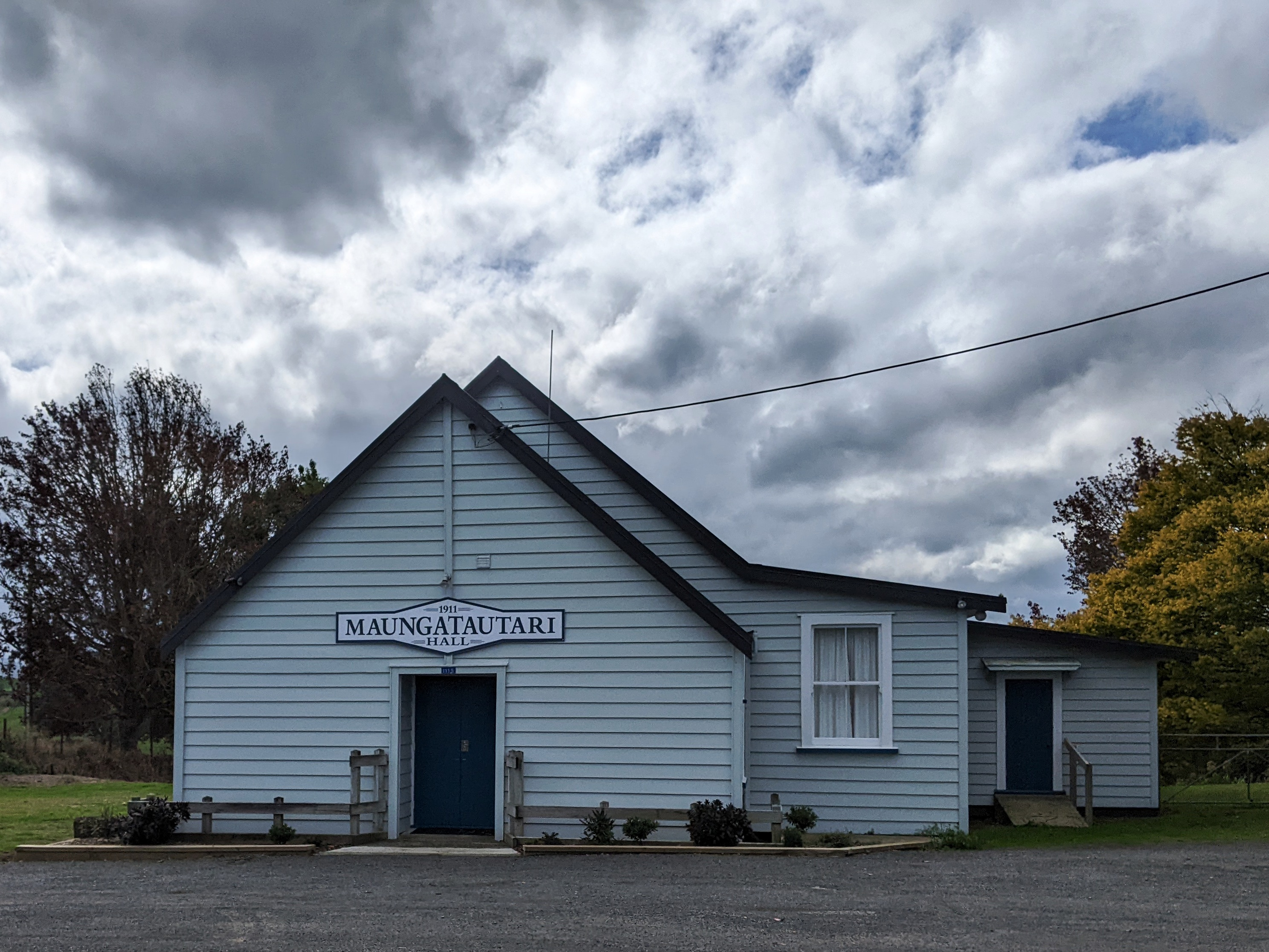
- Maungatautari Community Hall
- Interactive map of Maungatautari
- Coordinates: 37°58′S 175°34′E
- Country: New Zealand
- Region: Waikato
- District: Waipā District
- Ward: Maungatautari General Ward
- Community: Cambridge Community
- Electorates: Taranaki-King Country; Te Tai Hauāuru (Māori)

Government
  - Territorial Authority: Waipā District Council
  - Regional council: Waikato Regional Council
  - Mayor of Waipa: Mike Pettit
  - Taranaki-King Country MP: Barbara Kuriger
  - Te Tai Hauāuru MP: Debbie Ngarewa-Packer

Area
  - Territorial: 46.49 km^{2} (17.95 sq mi)

Population (2023 Census)
  - Territorial: 336
  - Density: 7.23/km^{2} (18.7/sq mi)
- Time zone: UTC+12 (NZST)
  - Summer (DST): UTC+13 (NZDT)

Maungatautari is a rural community in Waipā District, Waikato Region, New Zealand. It is located between Maungatautari Mountain and Lake Karapiro on the Waikato River. Horahora township is to its north west. Pukeatua township is on the southern flank of the volcano overlooked by a south eastern peak called Te Akatarere.

Maungatautari Marae and Te Manawanui meeting house located on the northern edge of the mountain, overlooking the Waikato River. It is a meeting place for the Ngāti Korokī Kahukura hapū of Ngāti Hourua and Ngāti Ueroa, the Ngāti Raukawa hapū of Ngāti Korokī and Ngāti Mahuta and the Waikato Tainui hapū of Ngāti Korokī and Ngāti Raukawa ki Panehākua. It is the main marae for the, Taute, Kara, Tupaea, Wirihana, Poka and Tauroa whānau, among others.

Waniwani Pā is also a traditional meeting ground for the Ngāti Korokī Kahukura hapū of Ngāti Waihoro.

== Demographics ==
Maungatautari community covers 46.49 km^{2} (17.95 sq mi). The community is part of the larger Maungatautari statistical area.

Historical population of the community
Year	Pop.	±% p.a.
2006	231	—
2013	252	+1.25%
2018	276	+1.84%
2023	336	+4.01%

Maungatautari community had a population of 336 in the 2023 New Zealand census, an increase of 60 people (21.7%) since the 2018 census, and an increase of 84 people (33.3%) since the 2013 census. There were 180 males and 159 females in 123 dwellings. 1.8% of people identified as LGBTIQ+. There were 75 people (22.3%) aged under 15 years, 48 (14.3%) aged 15 to 29, 165 (49.1%) aged 30 to 64, and 48 (14.3%) aged 65 or older.

People could identify as more than one ethnicity. The results were 87.5% European (Pākehā); 13.4% Māori; 1.8% Pasifika; 4.5% Asian; 0.9% Middle Eastern, Latin American and African New Zealanders (MELAA); and 3.6% other, which includes people giving their ethnicity as "New Zealander". English was spoken by 97.3%, Māori by 2.7%, Samoan by 0.9%, and other languages by 5.4%. No language could be spoken by 1.8% (e.g. too young to talk). The percentage of people born overseas was 21.4, compared with 28.8% nationally.

Religious affiliations were 25.0% Christian, 1.8% Māori religious beliefs, and 2.7% Buddhist. People who answered that they had no religion were 63.4%, and 7.1% of people did not answer the census question.

Of those at least 15 years old, 54 (20.7%) people had a bachelor's or higher degree, 156 (59.8%) had a post-high school certificate or diploma, and 51 (19.5%) people exclusively held high school qualifications. 33 people (12.6%) earned over $100,000 compared to 12.1% nationally. The employment status of those at least 15 was 171 (65.5%) full-time and 33 (12.6%) part-time.

== Maungatautari statistical area ==
Maungatautari statistical area covers 113.00 km^{2} (43.63 sq mi) and had an estimated population of 1,010 as of June 2025, with a population density of 8.9 people per km^{2}.

Historical population of the statistical area
Year	Pop.	±% p.a.
2006	717	—
2013	750	+0.64%
2018	822	+1.85%
2023	924	+2.37%

Maungatautari had a population of 924 in the 2023 New Zealand census, an increase of 102 people (12.4%) since the 2018 census, and an increase of 174 people (23.2%) since the 2013 census. There were 468 males, 453 females, and 3 people of other genders in 345 dwellings. 2.6% of people identified as LGBTIQ+. The median age was 41.3 years (compared with 38.1 years nationally). There were 198 people (21.4%) aged under 15 years, 141 (15.3%) aged 15 to 29, 447 (48.4%) aged 30 to 64, and 138 (14.9%) aged 65 or older.

People could identify as more than one ethnicity. The results were 88.0% European (Pākehā); 13.3% Māori; 1.6% Pasifika; 2.6% Asian; 0.6% Middle Eastern, Latin American and African New Zealanders (MELAA); and 2.6% other, which includes people giving their ethnicity as "New Zealander". English was spoken by 97.7%, Māori by 6.8%, Samoan by 0.3%, and other languages by 6.8%. No language could be spoken by 1.9% (e.g. too young to talk). New Zealand Sign Language was known by 0.3%. The percentage of people born overseas was 20.1, compared with 28.8% nationally.

Religious affiliations were 28.9% Christian, 0.3% Hindu, 1.9% Māori religious beliefs, 1.0% Buddhist, and 1.0% New Age. People who answered that they had no religion were 58.4%, and 8.8% of people did not answer the census question.

Of those at least 15 years old, 171 (23.6%) people had a bachelor's or higher degree, 432 (59.5%) had a post-high school certificate or diploma, and 132 (18.2%) people exclusively held high school qualifications. The median income was $51,500, compared with $41,500 nationally. 105 people (14.5%) earned over $100,000 compared to 12.1% nationally. The employment status of those at least 15 was 429 (59.1%) full-time, 120 (16.5%) part-time, and 6 (0.8%) unemployed.

== Education ==
John Eldon Gorst visited Maungatautari in 1861 and reported that the school, which had 30 pupils, had been abandoned due to the Taranaki War.

Maungatautari School was a primary school established in 1903 and closed in 2011.

Students now attend Horahora School, a co-educational state primary school, with a roll of 37 as of July 2026. The school was established in 1909.
