= Ngarua =

Settlement in Waikato, New Zealand

- Interactive map of Ngarua
- Coordinates: 37.670980°S 175.677409°E
- Country: New Zealand
- Region: Waikato Region
- District: Matamata-Piako District
- Ward: Te Aroha General Ward
- Electorates: Waikato; Hauraki-Waikato (Māori)

Government
  - Territorial Authority: Matamata-Piako District Council
  - Regional council: Waikato Regional Council
  - Mayor of Matamata-Piako: Ash Tanner
  - Waikato MP: Tim van de Molen
  - Hauraki-Waikato MP: Hana-Rawhiti Maipi-Clarke

Area
  - Total: 26.38 km^{2} (10.19 sq mi)

Population (2023 Census)
  - Total: 186
  - Density: 7.05/km^{2} (18.3/sq mi)

Ngarua is a rural community in the Matamata-Piako District and Waikato region of New Zealand's North Island.

It is located south-east of Tatuanui, west of Morrinsville and north of Waharoa and Matamata on State Highway 27.

The Tatua Dairy factory, in Tatuanui, is an independent co-operative owned by 114 shareholder farms from the Tatuanui and Ngarua area, all located within a 12 kilometre radius of the processing site. It exports specialist dairy products to more than 60 countries.

== History ==
=== 20th century ===
Ngarua developed as a dairy farming community around its first community hall, opened in 1908. The hall was extended in 1913 and was doubled in size in 1932. It hosted dances, concerts and community gatherings.

Ronald Candy began working on his father's Hubert Candy's farm in 1921, and took over the management of the farm in 1925. He turned the rough and poorly drained peat into productive farmland, tested his cows for butterfat production, and experimented with different fertilisers. In 1926, he started a Ngarua herd-testing group, becoming a pioneer in herd improvement. In the following years he became an early advocate for heavy top-dressing, adequate sub-division, good drainage and rotational grazing.

A Ngarua unit of the Home Guard was established for the Second World War. In 1946 the Ngarua District Roll of Honour and Roll of Service was unveiled in the community hall, commemorating local men who had died in both world wars.

In 1956, the Ngarua Memorial Hall was opened alongside the existing hall.

Candy's Ngarua farm, Somersby, went on to become a showplace for high production and one of the first examples of dairy beef production. He and many of his farm workers became dairy industry leaders. Candy retired from many of his public positions in 1968 and committed suicide on his Ngarua farm in 1974.

=== 21st century ===
The memorial hall was closed about 2005 and was sold to private owners in 2009. It was ultimately demolished in 2020.

The settlement's roll of honour was moved to the Ngarua Community Church. It was later transferred to Morrinsville Museum.

The area still consists of several dairy farms, like the fourth-generation Brown dairy farm.

== Demographics ==
Ngarua and its surrounds cover 26.38 km^{2} (10.19 sq mi). Ngarua is part of the larger Waitoa-Ngarua statistical area.

Historical population for Ngarua and surrounds
Year	Pop.	±% p.a.
2013	201	—
2018	174	−2.84%
2023	186	+1.34%

Ngarua had a population of 186 in the 2023 New Zealand census, an increase of 12 people (6.9%) since the 2018 census, and a decrease of 15 people (−7.5%) since the 2013 census. There were 102 males and 81 females in 69 dwellings. 1.6% of people identified as LGBTIQ+. The median age was 33.9 years (compared with 38.1 years nationally). There were 39 people (21.0%) aged under 15 years, 36 (19.4%) aged 15 to 29, 96 (51.6%) aged 30 to 64, and 15 (8.1%) aged 65 or older.

People could identify as more than one ethnicity. The results were 59.7% European (Pākehā); 11.3% Māori; 27.4% Asian; and 6.5% Middle Eastern, Latin American and African New Zealanders (MELAA). English was spoken by 91.9%, Māori language by 3.2%, and other languages by 21.0%. No language could be spoken by 3.2% (e.g. too young to talk). The percentage of people born overseas was 33.9, compared with 28.8% nationally.

Religious affiliations were 45.2% Christian, 4.8% Hindu, and 6.5% other religions. People who answered that they had no religion were 33.9%, and 8.1% of people did not answer the census question.

Of those at least 15 years old, 27 (18.4%) people had a bachelor's or higher degree, 69 (46.9%) had a post-high school certificate or diploma, and 45 (30.6%) people exclusively held high school qualifications. The median income was $57,400, compared with $41,500 nationally. 18 people (12.2%) earned over $100,000 compared to 12.1% nationally. The employment status of those at least 15 was that 93 (63.3%) people were employed full-time, 15 (10.2%) were part-time, and 3 (2.0%) were unemployed.

== Education ==
Te Wharekura o Te Rau Aroha is a co-educational state Māori immersion school for Year 1 to 13 students, with a roll of 138 as of July 2026.

There was previously a Ngarua School, established in 1907. It closed in 2001.
