= Pukemoremore =

Rural community in Waikato, New Zealand

- Interactive map of Pukemoremore
- Coordinates: 37.813219°S 175.453661°E
- Country: New Zealand
- Region: Waikato
- District: Waikato District
- Wards: Tamahere-Woodlands General Ward; Tai Runga Takiwaa Maaori Ward
- Electorates: Waikato; Hauraki-Waikato (Māori)

Government
  - Territorial Authority: Waikato District Council
  - Regional council: Waikato Regional Council
  - Mayor of Waikato: Aksel Bech
  - Waikato MP: Tim van de Molen
  - Hauraki-Waikato MP: Hana-Rawhiti Maipi-Clarke

Area
  - Total: 43.28 km^{2} (16.71 sq mi)

Population (June 2025)
  - Total: 2,690
  - Density: 62.2/km^{2} (161/sq mi)

Pukemoremore is a mount and surrounding rural community in the Waikato District and Waikato region of New Zealand's North Island.

== Demographics ==
Pukemoremore statistical area, which includes Matangi, covers 43.28 km^{2} (16.71 sq mi) and had an estimated population of 2,690 as of June 2025, with a population density of 62 people per km^{2}.

Historical population
Year	Pop.	±% p.a.
2006	1,866	—
2013	2,097	+1.68%
2018	2,394	+2.68%
2023	2,580	+1.51%

Pukemoremore had a population of 2,580 in the 2023 New Zealand census, an increase of 186 people (7.8%) since the 2018 census, and an increase of 483 people (23.0%) since the 2013 census. There were 1,305 males, 1,269 females and 9 people of other genders in 816 dwellings. 1.9% of people identified as LGBTIQ+. The median age was 41.4 years (compared with 38.1 years nationally). There were 537 people (20.8%) aged under 15 years, 435 (16.9%) aged 15 to 29, 1,257 (48.7%) aged 30 to 64, and 351 (13.6%) aged 65 or older.

People could identify as more than one ethnicity. The results were 81.0% European (Pākehā); 21.3% Māori; 2.2% Pasifika; 5.6% Asian; 0.6% Middle Eastern, Latin American and African New Zealanders (MELAA); and 2.6% other, which includes people giving their ethnicity as "New Zealander". English was spoken by 97.2%, Māori language by 7.0%, and other languages by 9.5%. No language could be spoken by 1.6% (e.g. too young to talk). New Zealand Sign Language was known by 0.3%. The percentage of people born overseas was 17.4, compared with 28.8% nationally.

Religious affiliations were 32.3% Christian, 0.5% Hindu, 1.6% Māori religious beliefs, 0.3% Buddhist, 0.3% New Age, and 1.7% other religions. People who answered that they had no religion were 57.3%, and 6.0% of people did not answer the census question.

Of those at least 15 years old, 645 (31.6%) people had a bachelor's or higher degree, 1,038 (50.8%) had a post-high school certificate or diploma, and 360 (17.6%) people exclusively held high school qualifications. The median income was $48,500, compared with $41,500 nationally. 366 people (17.9%) earned over $100,000 compared to 12.1% nationally. The employment status of those at least 15 was that 1,161 (56.8%) people were employed full-time, 333 (16.3%) were part-time, and 42 (2.1%) were unemployed.

== Education ==
Ngāti Haua School (Te Kura o Ngaati Hauaa) is a co-educational state primary school for Year 1-8 students, with a roll of 118 as of July 2026. It is a Māori language school. It opened in 1955.
