= Tamahere =

Settlement in Waikato, New Zealand

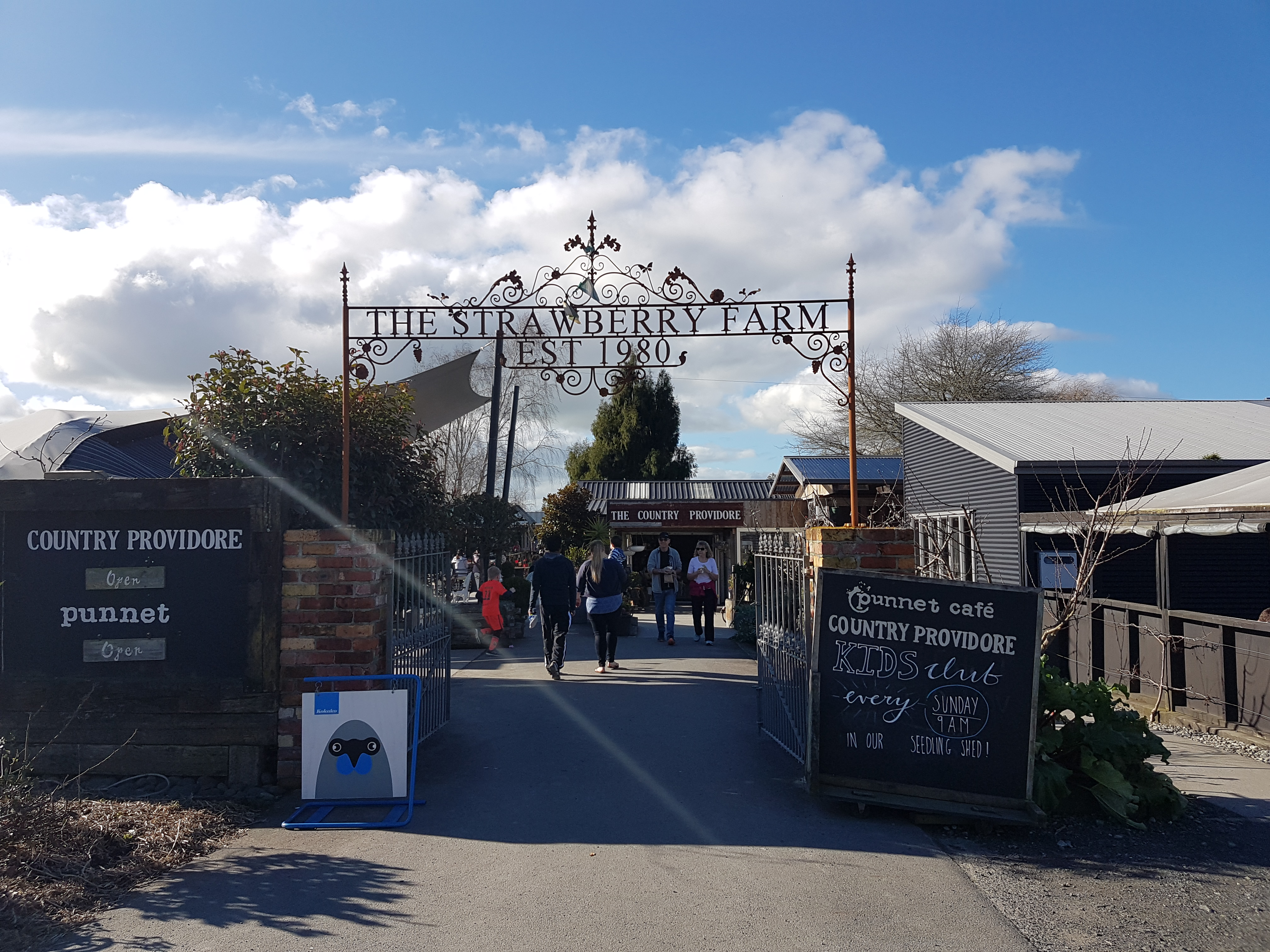
- Punnet Strawberry Farm at Tamahere
- Interactive map of Tamahere
- Coordinates: 37°49′33.07″S 175°21′7.39″E
- Country: New Zealand
- Region: Waikato
- District: Waikato District
- Wards: Tamahere-Woodlands General Ward; Tai Runga Takiwaa Maaori Ward
- Electorates: Waikato; Hauraki-Waikato (Māori)

Government
  - Territorial Authority: Waikato District Council
  - Regional council: Waikato Regional Council
  - Mayor of Waikato: Aksel Bech
  - Waikato MP: Tim van de Molen
  - Hauraki-Waikato MP: Hana-Rawhiti Maipi-Clarke

Area
  - Total: 57.51 km^{2} (22.20 sq mi)

Population (June 2025)
  - Total: 6,930
  - Density: 121/km^{2} (312/sq mi)

Tamahere is a locality in the Waikato District, New Zealand; on the outskirts of Hamilton. The majority of the Ward is zoned as Country Living, with a minimum lot size of 0.5ha. The landscape is dominated by several large gully systems that contribute to the Waikato River.

== Etymology ==
Tamahere means 'bound son' in the Mãori language. The name references a story where a matriarch swam the Waikato River with her son attached to her back.

== Demographics ==
Tamahere covers 57.51 km^{2} (22.20 sq mi) and had an estimated population of 6,930 as of June 2025, with a population density of 121 people per km^{2}.

Historical population
Year	Pop.	±% p.a.
2006	4,029	—
2013	4,965	+3.03%
2018	6,126	+4.29%
2023	6,723	+1.88%

Tamahere had a population of 6,723 in the 2023 New Zealand census, an increase of 597 people (9.7%) since the 2018 census, and an increase of 1,758 people (35.4%) since the 2013 census. There were 3,309 males, 3,402 females and 15 people of other genders in 2,262 dwellings. 2.0% of people identified as LGBTIQ+. The median age was 47.0 years (compared with 38.1 years nationally). There were 1,293 people (19.2%) aged under 15 years, 954 (14.2%) aged 15 to 29, 2,994 (44.5%) aged 30 to 64, and 1,482 (22.0%) aged 65 or older.

People could identify as more than one ethnicity. The results were 85.3% European (Pākehā); 10.3% Māori; 1.1% Pasifika; 11.2% Asian; 0.8% Middle Eastern, Latin American and African New Zealanders (MELAA); and 2.7% other, which includes people giving their ethnicity as "New Zealander". English was spoken by 97.6%, Māori language by 2.1%, Samoan by 0.1%, and other languages by 12.3%. No language could be spoken by 1.1% (e.g. too young to talk). New Zealand Sign Language was known by 0.3%. The percentage of people born overseas was 23.3, compared with 28.8% nationally.

Religious affiliations were 36.9% Christian, 1.9% Hindu, 0.5% Islam, 0.2% Māori religious beliefs, 0.6% Buddhist, 0.1% New Age, 0.1% Jewish, and 1.4% other religions. People who answered that they had no religion were 52.6%, and 5.8% of people did not answer the census question.

Of those at least 15 years old, 2,058 (37.9%) people had a bachelor's or higher degree, 2,535 (46.7%) had a post-high school certificate or diploma, and 837 (15.4%) people exclusively held high school qualifications. The median income was $51,400, compared with $41,500 nationally. 1,386 people (25.5%) earned over $100,000 compared to 12.1% nationally. The employment status of those at least 15 was that 2,607 (48.0%) people were employed full-time, 906 (16.7%) were part-time, and 66 (1.2%) were unemployed.

Individual statistical areas
Name	Area (km^{2})	Population	Density (per km^{2})	Dwellings	Median age	Median income
Tamahere North	12.98	2,706	208	963	49.9 years	$46,500
Tamahere West	5.69	1,734	305	495	41.0 years	$59,700
Tamahere South	38.84	2,289	59	804	48.2 years	$50,600
New Zealand					38.1 years	$41,500

== Tamahere coolstore explosion ==
On 5 April 2008 a coolstore caught fire and one fireman was killed and seven injured, when 400 kg (880 lb) of a propane and ethane refrigerant exploded. The site is being developed in to housing.

== Education ==
John Eldon Gorst visited Tamahere in 1861 and noted the school there had been abandoned. The teacher blamed the growing tensions between the Crown and Mãori but Wiremu Tamihana told Gorst that the teacher had spent too much time in Auckland that the pupils simply left by the time he returned.

The Tamahere Model Country School is a state primary school for Year 1 to 6 students, with a roll of 365. The school opened in 1884.

Hamilton Seventh-day Adventist School is a state-integrated Seventh-day Adventist Year 1-8 primary school, with a roll of 119. It opened in 1920, closed in 1932, and reopened a year later.

Waikato Montessori Education Centre is private Montessori Year 1-8 primary school, with a roll of 56. It opened in 2012.

All these schools are co-educational. Rolls are as of July 2026.

Tamahere also has three pre-schools.

== Notable people ==
Wiremu Tamihana Mãori tribal leader involved in the Maori king movement, born at Tamahere.
