= Waihou =

Settlement in Waikato, New Zealand

- Interactive map of Waihou
- Coordinates: 37.574°S 175.674°E
- Country: New Zealand
- Region: Waikato
- District: Matamata-Piako District
- Ward: Te Aroha Ward
- Electorates: Waikato; Hauraki-Waikato (Māori)

Government
  - Territorial Authority: Matamata-Piako District Council
  - Regional council: Waikato Regional Council
  - Mayor of Matamata-Piako: Ash Tanner
  - Waikato MP: Tim van de Molen
  - Hauraki-Waikato MP: Hana-Rawhiti Maipi-Clarke

Area
  - Total: 0.52 km^{2} (0.20 sq mi)

Population (June 2025)
  - Total: 340
  - Density: 650/km^{2} (1,700/sq mi)

Waihou is a rural settlement in the Matamata-Piako District and Waikato region of New Zealand's North Island. It is located on State Highway 26 between Te Aroha and Morrinsville and west of the Waihou River.

== Etymology ==
Waihou was originally known as Te Kapara and later Ardmore. The name Waihou is derived from the Waihou River.

== History ==
In 1879, 200 allotments had been laid out from the larger land block. Waihou was typically accessed via boat. Waihou was a pioneer settlement with most settlers coming from England, Scotland, and Ireland.

In 1880 Waihou was a hamlet, with a school service conducted out of a private home, a hall, and a hotel. The Hamilton to Te Aroha railway passed through the settlement.

Waihou was along the road between Hamilton and gold fields in the Kaimais, this led to many settlers leaving for the gold fields. The sections in Waihou became cheap and many settlers who otherwise would not have been able to afford large sections purchased sections at Waihou.

In the early 1900s, Waihou had a population of about 100, a railway siding, and a primary school.

== Demographics ==
Statistics New Zealand describes Waihou as a rural settlement, which covers 0.52 km^{2} (0.20 sq mi) and had an estimated population of 340 as of June 2025, with a population density of 654 people per km^{2}. Waihou is part of the larger Waihou-Manawaru statistical area.

Historical population
Year	Pop.	±% p.a.
2006	261	—
2013	261	+0.00%
2018	300	+2.82%
2023	330	+1.92%
The 2006 population is for a larger area of 1.29 km^{2}. Source:

Waihou had a population of 330 in the 2023 New Zealand census, an increase of 30 people (10.0%) since the 2018 census, and an increase of 69 people (26.4%) since the 2013 census. There were 168 males, 162 females and 3 people of other genders in 126 dwellings. 2.7% of people identified as LGBTIQ+. The median age was 41.1 years (compared with 38.1 years nationally). There were 57 people (17.3%) aged under 15 years, 60 (18.2%) aged 15 to 29, 144 (43.6%) aged 30 to 64, and 72 (21.8%) aged 65 or older.

People could identify as more than one ethnicity. The results were 92.7% European (Pākehā), 20.9% Māori, and 4.5% Pasifika. English was spoken by 97.3%, Māori language by 1.8%, and other languages by 2.7%. No language could be spoken by 3.6% (e.g. too young to talk). New Zealand Sign Language was known by 0.9%. The percentage of people born overseas was 9.1, compared with 28.8% nationally.

Religious affiliations were 23.6% Christian, 0.9% Buddhist, 0.9% New Age, and 1.8% other religions. People who answered that they had no religion were 61.8%, and 10.9% of people did not answer the census question.

Of those at least 15 years old, 30 (11.0%) people had a bachelor's or higher degree, 159 (58.2%) had a post-high school certificate or diploma, and 81 (29.7%) people exclusively held high school qualifications. The median income was $33,700, compared with $41,500 nationally. 15 people (5.5%) earned over $100,000 compared to 12.1% nationally. The employment status of those at least 15 was that 138 (50.5%) people were employed full-time, 36 (13.2%) were part-time, and 6 (2.2%) were unemployed.

== Education ==
Waihou School opened in 1880 in the town hall and served 15 students. In 1898 it moved to a purpose built structure. At the beginning of the 20th century it has 110 students on the roll. It closed in 2000.

Elstow-Waihou Combined School, called Elstow School before 2000, is a full primary school catering for years 1–8. It has a roll of 167 as of July 2026. It was founded in 1901 and is seven kilometres northwest of Waihou.
