= Netherton, New Zealand =

Coordinates: 37°20′S 175°36′E

Netherton is a rural community in the Hauraki District and Waikato region of New Zealand's North Island.

== Education ==
Netherton School is a co-educational state primary school, with a roll of 139 as of July 2025.
