= Tatua Dairy Company =

New Zealand dairy co-operative

The Tatua Co-operative Dairy Company Limited
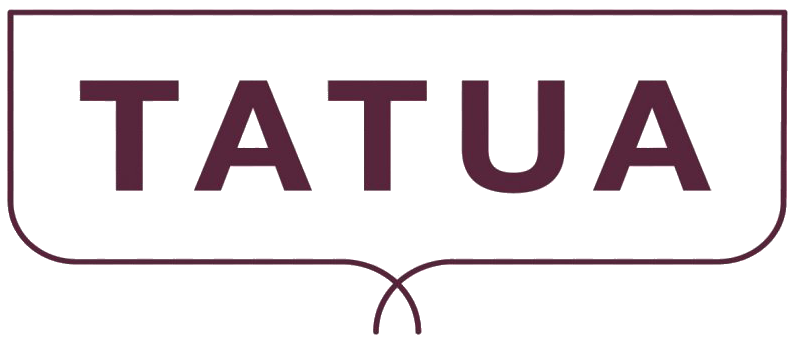
- Type: Cooperative
- Industry: Food Manufacturing, Dairy
- Founded: 1914
- Headquarters: Tatuanui, Morrinsville, New Zealand
- Products: Specialised dairy ingredients and dairy foods including, nutritional ingredients, flavours, bionutrients, consumer and foodservice dairy products and bulk ingredients.
- Revenue: NZ$535 million
- Members: 101 shareholder farms
- Number of employees: 400
- Website: tatua.com

The Tatua Co-operative Dairy Company Ltd, trading as Tatua, is an independent co-operative dairy company in the Matamata-Piako District of the Waikato Region, in the North Island of New Zealand. It is located in the rural locality of Tatuanui, approximately 8 kilometres east of Morrinsville. The co-operative is owned by 101 shareholder farms, all located within a 12 kilometre radius of the processing factory.

== Independence ==
The co-operative has maintained a strong independent history within the New Zealand dairy industry. In the 2001 mega-merger for the New Zealand dairy industry – which formed Fonterra – Tatua shareholders decided to remain independent. Given that New Zealand had over 500 dairy co-operatives in the 1930s, Tatua is unique in that it is the only New Zealand dairy co-operative remaining that has never been part of any merger throughout its history.

== See also ==
- Dairy farming in New Zealand

== Organisational Memberships ==
- New Zealand Co-operatives Association (Inc) https://nz.coop/
- Dairy Companies Association of New Zealand (DCANZ) https://dcanz.com/
