= Hamilton Seventh-day Adventist School =

Location
- Annebrook Road R D 3, Hamilton, Waikato; 37.806890°S 175.338014°E

Information
- Type: Integrated:State, Co-educational, Full Primary
- Established: 1971
- Ministry of Education Institution no.: 4105
- Principal: Shaun Hurlow
- Enrolment: 119 (July 2026)
- Socio-economic decile: 7
- Website: www.hamiltonsda.school.nz/

The Hamilton Seventh-day Adventist School is an integrated co-educational day school in Hamilton, New Zealand, with a comprehensive programme comprising both primary and intermediate education, from Year 0 (new entrants) to Year 8 (form 2). The school is owned and operated by the Seventh-day Adventist Church. It provides education in harmony with the beliefs, values, life-style and commitment of the church. Emphasis is placed on the development of a Christian character and a life of service in the community.

It is a part of the Seventh-day Adventist education system, the world's second largest Christian school system.

The school is run by a board of trustees consisting of: members elected by the parents, Seventh-day Adventist Church proprietor representatives, the Principal, and a staff representative.

The school was established on its present site in 1971. It is situated on 2.5 hectares of ground providing adequate space for the classrooms and recreational facilities. Included in the school buildings are three classrooms, an office, the library, and two resource rooms.

The grounds provide a playing field for recreational activities such as soccer, hockey, touch rugby, cricket and softball. A multipurpose court caters for tennis, patter tennis, netball, and basketball. A barked adventure playground provides climbing equipment, slides, swings etc., and a sandpit provides clean sand in which to dig and play. Both these areas are "sun-shaded". The school has many large trees, which provide shade and shelter.

== See also ==
- Seventh-day Adventist education
- List of Seventh-day Adventist secondary schools
