= Waipā District Council =

Territorial authority of New Zealand

Coordinates: 38.010649°S 175.3213194°E

- Brand logo

Type
- Type: Territorial authority of Waipā District
- Term limits: None

History
- Established: 1 November 1989; 36 years ago
- Preceded by: Waipa County Council; Waikato County Council; Raglan County Council; Matamata County Council; Cambridge Borough Council; Te Awamutu Borough Council
- New session started: 17 October 2025

Leadership
- Mayor: Mike Pettit, Ind. since 17 October 2025
- Deputy: Jo Davies-Colley, Ind. since 31 October 2025
- CEO: Steph O'Sullivan since 26 August 2024

Structure
- Seats: 14 (including mayor)
- Political groups: Independent (13); Better Waipa (1)
- Length of term: 3 years

Elections
- Voting system: First-past-the-post
- First election: 14 October 1989
- Last election: 11 October 2025
- Next election: 14 October 2028

Meeting place
- 101 Bank Street, Te Awamutu

Website
- waipadc.govt.nz

Waipā District Council (abbr. WDC) is the territorial authority for the Waipā District of New Zealand. It serves as the district's local government alongside the Waikato Regional Council as the regional council. The current entity has existed since 1989, prior to which local government in the area was split between six local authorities.

The governing body of the council has 13 councillors and is chaired by the mayor of Waipā (currently Mike Pettit since October 2025). There also two community boards.

== History ==
=== 1989 reforms ===
The council was established in 1989, through the merger of Waipa County Council, Cambridge Borough Council (established in 1886), and Te Awamutu Borough Council (established in 1915).

== Governing body ==
=== Mayor ===
One mayor is elected at-large; they chair meetings of the governing body and act as the head of local government in the district. The current mayor is Mike Pettit, who was elected in the 2025 local elections.

=== Current composition ===
The current members of the governing body of council are:

Waipā District Council, 2025–2028
Role	Name	Affiliation	Ward
Mayor	Mike Pettit	Independent	Elected at-large
Deputy	Jo Davies-Colley	Independent	Cambridge
Councillor	Roger Gordon	Independent	Cambridge
Councillor	Aidhean Camson	Independent	Cambridge
Councillor	Pip Kempthorne	Independent	Cambridge
Councillor	Mike Montgomerie	Independent	Maungatautari
Councillor	Clare St Pierre	Independent	Pirongia and Kakepuku
Councillor	Les Bennett	Better Waipa	Pirongia and Kakepuku
Councillor	Shane Walsh	Independent	Te Awamutu and Kihikihi
Councillor	Dean Taylor	Independent	Te Awamutu and Kihikihi
Councillor	Marcus Gower	Independent	Te Awamutu and Kihikihi
Councillor	Dale-Maree Morgan	Independent	Waipā Māori

== Community boards ==
The Waipā District Council currently has two community boards:

- Cambridge Community Board: Charlotte FitzPatrick (Chair), Gerda Venter, Chris Minneé, Stewart Dromgool, Andrew Myers
- Te Awamutu and Kihikihi Community Board: Ange Holt (Chair), Liam Bullen, Jill Taylor, John Wood, Kane Titchener

== Wards ==
Councillors are elected from across five wards; One councillor is returned from the Waipā Māori ward, which covers the entire district, four from Cambridge general ward, three from Te Awamutu-Kihikihi general ward, two from Pirongia-Kakepuku general ward, and one from Maungatautari general ward.

The council established a Māori ward in 2021, with the first Māori ward councillor elected in the 2022 local elections.

== Elections ==
=== List ===
==== Council ====
- 1989
- 1992
- 1995
- 1998
- 2001
- 2004
- 2007
- 2010
- 2013
- 2016
- 2019
- 2022
- 2025

==== Mayoral ====
- 1989
- 1992
- 1995
- 1998
- 2001
- 2004
- 2007
- 2010
- 2013
- 2016
- 2019
- 2022
- 2025
