= Mayor of Waipā =

Mayor of Waipa
- Incumbent; Mike Pettit since 2025
- Style: His/Her Worship
- Seat: 101 Bank Street, Te Awamutu
- Term length: 3 years
- Formation: 1989
- First holder: Bruce Berquist
- Deputy: Jo Davies-Colley

The mayor of Waipā officiates over the Waipā District of New Zealand's North Island. There have been six mayors since the formation of Waipā District in 1989. The incumbent mayor is Mike Pettit, who was elected on 16 October 2025.

== History ==
Bruce Berquist was elected the first mayor of Waipā District in 1989, defeating chief executive of Hamilton Airport, Barry O'Connor. Berquist stood down at the 1995 local-body elections, when the mayoralty was contested by Te Miro farmer John Hewitt and the National Party MP Katherine O'Regan. Most pundits considered that O'Regan would win, but Hewitt was elected with a substantial majority. Hewitt considered resigning the following year when his wife, Joslyn, was diagnosed and subsequently died from bone cancer. However, he remained in office, and was re-elected in 1998 with a majority of 400 votes, before deciding not to seek re-election in 2001.

Alan Livingston was elected mayor in 2001, and served four terms before stepping down in 2013. Livingston later served as chair of the Waikato Regional Council from 2016 to 2019, and was appointed an Officer of the New Zealand Order of Merit, for services to sports and the community, in the 2014 New Year Honours.

Jim Mylchreest, was first elected in 2013, with a margin of more than 600 votes over nearest rival Pat Bishop in a four-candidate race. He was re-elected in 2016, defeating the only other candidate, Vern Wilson, by over 4500 votes, and was elected unopposed in 2019.

In 2022, he lost by 1900 votes to two-term councillor Susan O'Regan, whose mother Katherine O'Regan had missed out on the mayoralty in 1995. Mike Pettit defeated O'Regan in 2025.

== List of officeholders ==
	Name	Portrait	Term of office
1	Bruce Berquist		1989–1995
2	John Hewitt		1995–2001
3	Alan Livingston		2001–2013
4	Jim Mylchreest		2013–2022
5	Susan O'Regan		2022–2025
6	Mike Pettit		2025–present
