= Tim van de Molen =

New Zealand politician (born 1985)

Tim van de Molen MP
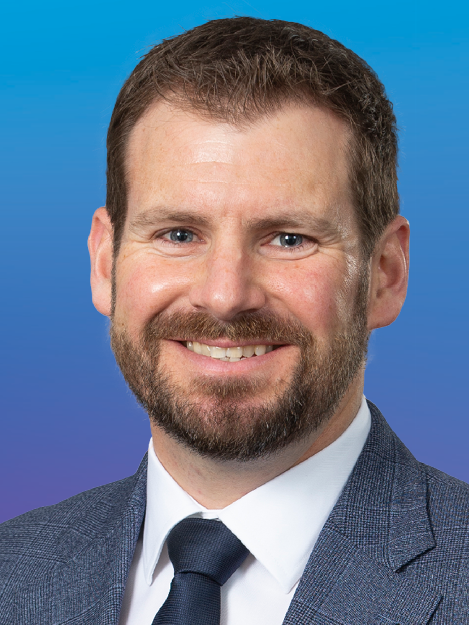
- van de Molen in 2023

Member of the New Zealand Parliament for Waikato
- Incumbent
- Assumed office 23 September 2017
- Preceded by: Lindsay Tisch

Personal details
- Born: Timothy John van de Molen; 1985 (age 40–41)
- Party: National
- Spouse: Hilary
- Children: Two

Timothy John van de Molen (born 1985) is a New Zealand politician. He is a Member of the House of Representatives for the Waikato electorate and a representative of the National Party.

== Early life and family ==
Born in 1985 to two primary school teachers and one of five children, van de Molen grew up mainly in Matamata. His great-great-grandfather John Stevens was a Liberal Member of Parliament for Rangitikei and Manawatu between 1881 and 1908.

He attended Matamata College and graduated from the University of Waikato with a degree in psychology.

Van de Molen is married to his wife Hilary and has a daughter and a son. The family lives in Tamahere, Waikato.

In February 2022 van de Molen fell from a platform, resulting in two broken arms and a fractured spine and rib.

== Career ==
Van de Molen has worked as a dairy, sheep and beef farmer. He appeared in the 2002 nude calendar made by the Ngarua Young Farmers Club. He was active in the national young farmers organisation and was elected junior vice president in 2007. He won the NZ Young Farmer of the Year Award and was runner up in 2011. From 2009, van de Molen began working as an agribusiness manager with the National Bank of New Zealand, ANZ, and Rabobank. Through the same period, he served in the New Zealand Territorial Force and as a volunteer with ambulance service St John New Zealand.

== Political career ==
New Zealand Parliament
Years	Term	Electorate	List	Party
2017–2020	52nd	Waikato	66	National
2020–2023	53rd	Waikato	42	National
2023–2026	54th	Waikato	58	National
2026–present	55th	Waikato	48	National

=== In opposition, 2017–2020 ===
At the 2017 general election van de Molen sought to replace Lindsay Tisch, who was retiring, as the National Party candidate in the Waikato electorate. He won the selection and was elected with 61% of the vote. He said that his focuses in his first electorate are improving broadband in rural areas, advancing a Waikato medical school to train rural GPs, and agriculture and transport issues.

In 2018, van de Molen took on the role of the National Party's third whip. He has been the National Party opposition spokesperson for building and construction, biosecurity, animal welfare, oceans and fisheries, defence, horticulture, veterans, and ACC. Between 2017 and 2023, van de Molen served on the primary production and the transport and infrastructure select committees. Since 2023, he has chaired the committee on foreign affairs, defence and trade. He was comfortably re-elected in the 2020 election.

On 1 August 2023 he was referred to the privileges committee following allegations he had threatened fellow MP Shanan Halbert following a select committee hearing. On 24 August 2023, the committee's report concluded that he had threatened Halbert, saying that his conduct was "aggressive in the sense of being hostile, unprofessional and... with an element that was objectively threatening, but not in the sense of physical violence". Van de Molen was found in contempt of Parliament and censured; in addition, National leader Christopher Luxon removed him from his portfolios. Van de Molen accepted the committee's findings and issued a public apology.

=== In government, 2023–present ===
During the 2023 New Zealand general election, van de Molen contested and won the Waikato electorate.

During the 2026 New Zealand general election, van de Molen contested Waikato again for National. He was ranked 48th on the National Party list. Based on preliminary results, van de Molen retained Waikato by a landslide margin of 12,576 votes.

== Views and positions ==
=== Euthanasia ===
Van de Molen voted in favour of the final reading for the End of Life Choice Bill in 2019, unlike most of his National MP colleagues.

=== Abortion ===
He voted in favour of the first and second readings of the Abortion Legislation Bill of 2019, but against its third, final reading.

New Zealand Parliament
Preceded by Lindsay Tisch	Member of Parliament for Waikato; 2017–present	Incumbent
