= Waikato Regional Council =

Regional council in New Zealand

Waikato Regional Council Te Kaunihera ā Rohe o Waikato
- Regional councils of New Zealand

Type
- Type: Unicameral
- Established: 6 March 1989, 37 years ago

Leadership
- Chair: Warren Maher, Rates Control Team since 29 October 2025
- Deputy: Mich'eal Downard, Rates Control Team since 29 October 2025
- CEO: Chris McLay since 27 August 2020

Structure
- Seats: 14 seats
- Political groups: Rates Control Team (7); Independent (7)
- Length of term: 3 years, renewable

Elections
- Voting system: First-past-the-post
- Last election: 11 October 2025
- Next election: 2028

Website
- waikatoregion.govt.nz

The Waikato Regional Council is the regional local government authority that administers the Waikato Region of New Zealand's North Island. It was formerly known as Environment Waikato but this name is no longer used.

The current chairperson is Warren Maher, who was elected on 29 October 2025 following the 2025 local election. Deputy Mich'eal Downard was also elected then.

== List of chairpersons ==
- 2022: Pamela Storey; deputy Bruce Clarkson
- October 2025: Warren Maher; deputy Mich'eal Downard

== Councillors ==
Councillor	Affiliation	Constituency	In office since
Pamela Storey (Chair)	Independent	Waikato general	18 October 2019
Bruce Clarkson (Deputy)	Independent	Hamilton general	15 October 2022
Angela Strange	Independent	Hamilton general	18 October 2019
Jennifer Nickel	Independent	Hamilton general	18 October 2019
Chris Hughes	Independent	Hamilton general	15 October 2022
Mich'eal Downard	Independent	Taupō-Rotorua general	15 October 2022
Warren Maher	Independent	Thames‐Coromandel general	15 October 2022
Ben Dunbar-Smith	Independent	Waihou general	15 October 2022
Robert Cookson	Independent	Waihou general	15 October 2022
Noel Smith	Independent	Waikato general	15 October 2022
Stu Kneebone	Independent	Waipa-King Country general	15 October 2010
Clyde Graaf	Independent	Waipa-King Country general	15 October 2022
Tipa Mahuta	Independent	Ngā Hau e Whā Māori	October 2013
Kataraina Hodge	Independent	Ngā Tai ki Uta Māori	October 2016

== Elections ==
- 1989
- 1992
- 1995
- 1998
- 2001
- 2004
- 2007
- 2010
- 2013
- 2016
- 2019
- 2022
- 2025
