= Maraetai (disambiguation) =

Maraetai is a small satellite town east of Auckland, New Zealand.

Maraetai may also refer to:

- Maraetai Dam, a hydroelectric dam on the Waikato River near Mangakino
  - Maraetai I, a hydroelectric power station
  - Maraetai II, a hydroelectric power station
- Lake Maraetai, an artificial lake formed behind the Maraetai Dam
