= Mangatangi =

Locality in Waikato, New Zealand

- Locality
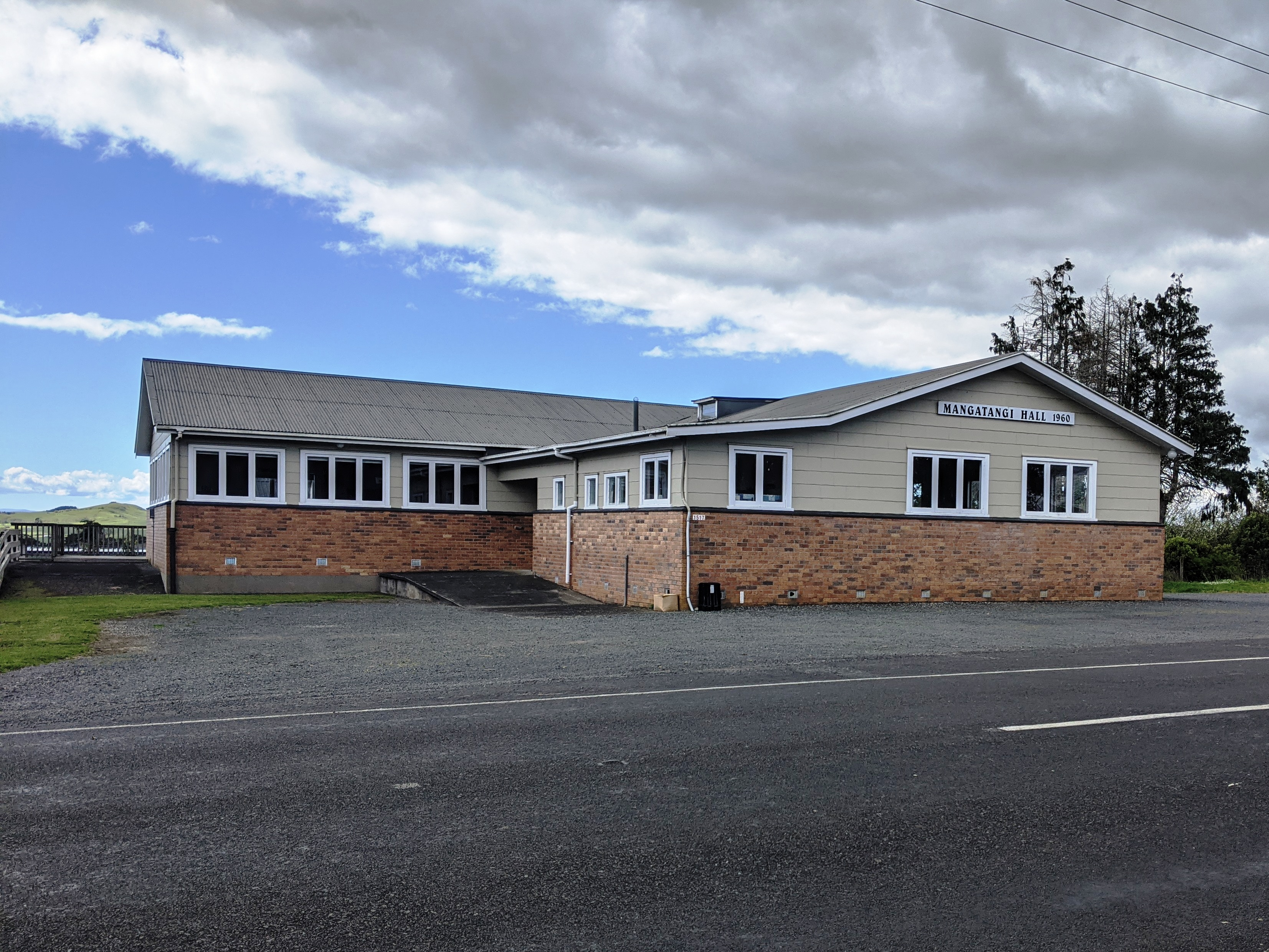
- Mangatangi Hall
- Interactive map of Mangatangi
- Coordinates: 37.201°S 175.199°E
- Country: New Zealand
- Region: Waikato
- District: Waikato District
- Wards: Awaroa-Maramarua General Ward; Tai Raro Takiwaa Maaori Ward
- Electorates: Coromandel; Hauraki-Waikato (Māori)

Government
  - Territorial Authority: Waikato District Council
  - Regional council: Waikato Regional Council
  - Mayor of Waikato: Aksel Bech
  - Port Waikato MP: Andrew Bayly
  - Hauraki-Waikato MP: Hana-Rawhiti Maipi-Clarke

Area
  - Total: 74.18 km^{2} (28.64 sq mi)
- Elevation: 60 m (200 ft)

Population (2023 census)
  - Total: 369
  - Density: 4.97/km^{2} (12.9/sq mi)
- Time zone: UTC+12 (NZST)
  - Summer (DST): UTC+13 (NZDT)

Mangatangi is a locality about 7 km east of Mangatāwhiri and 10.5 km west of Miranda in the Waikato District in the North Island of New Zealand.

Mangatangi Reservoir in the Hunua Ranges to the north was created by the Mangatangi Dam, a rolled earth water supply dam built in the 1970s. The Mangatangi River flows south from the reservoir to become the Maramarua River.

The New Zealand Ministry for Culture and Heritage gives a translation of "Stream of Weeping" for Mangatangi.

The Mangatangi Hall on Kaiaua Road was opened in 1940 and extended in 1960. It contains the Mangatangi-Miranda roll of honour for local people who fought in the Second World War.

== Demographics ==
Mangatangi locality is in two SA1 statistical areas which cover 74.18 km^{2} (28.64 sq mi) The SA1 areas are part of the larger Mangatangi statistical area.

Historical population for Mangatangi locality
Year	Pop.	±% p.a.
2013	270	—
2018	333	+4.28%
2023	369	+2.07%

The locality had a population of 369 in the 2023 New Zealand census, an increase of 36 people (10.8%) since the 2018 census, and an increase of 99 people (36.7%) since the 2013 census. There were 183 males and 186 females in 123 dwellings. 0.8% of people identified as LGBTIQ+. There were 90 people (24.4%) aged under 15 years, 45 (12.2%) aged 15 to 29, 186 (50.4%) aged 30 to 64, and 45 (12.2%) aged 65 or older.

People could identify as more than one ethnicity. The results were 79.7% European (Pākehā), 32.5% Māori, 8.1% Pasifika, and 2.4% Asian. English was spoken by 95.1%, Māori language by 5.7%, Samoan by 0.8%, and other languages by 4.1%. No language could be spoken by 4.1% (e.g. too young to talk). New Zealand Sign Language was known by 1.6%. The percentage of people born overseas was 8.9, compared with 28.8% nationally.

The only given religious affiliations was 26.0% Christian. People who answered that they had no religion were 65.9%, and 8.1% of people did not answer the census question.

Of those at least 15 years old, 60 (21.5%) people had a bachelor's or higher degree, 159 (57.0%) had a post-high school certificate or diploma, and 75 (26.9%) people exclusively held high school qualifications. 36 people (12.9%) earned over $100,000 compared to 12.1% nationally. The employment status of those at least 15 was that 159 (57.0%) people were employed full-time, 42 (15.1%) were part-time, and 3 (1.1%) were unemployed.

=== Mangatangi statistical area ===
Mangatangi statistical area, which also includes Mangatāwhiri, covers 258.19 km^{2} (99.69 sq mi) and had an estimated population of 1,170 as of June 2025, with a population density of 4.5 people per km^{2}.

Historical population for the statistical area
Year	Pop.	±% p.a.
2006	858	—
2013	930	+1.16%
2018	1,083	+3.09%
2023	1,131	+0.87%

Mangatangi statistical area had a population of 1,131 in the 2023 New Zealand census, an increase of 48 people (4.4%) since the 2018 census, and an increase of 201 people (21.6%) since the 2013 census. There were 594 males, 531 females and 3 people of other genders in 375 dwellings. 1.9% of people identified as LGBTIQ+. The median age was 36.6 years (compared with 38.1 years nationally). There were 261 people (23.1%) aged under 15 years, 189 (16.7%) aged 15 to 29, 543 (48.0%) aged 30 to 64, and 138 (12.2%) aged 65 or older.

People could identify as more than one ethnicity. The results were 80.6% European (Pākehā); 21.8% Māori; 9.0% Pasifika; 4.0% Asian; 1.1% Middle Eastern, Latin American and African New Zealanders (MELAA); and 3.2% other, which includes people giving their ethnicity as "New Zealander". English was spoken by 95.0%, Māori language by 3.2%, Samoan by 0.8%, and other languages by 7.4%. No language could be spoken by 2.9% (e.g. too young to talk). New Zealand Sign Language was known by 0.3%. The percentage of people born overseas was 16.7, compared with 28.8% nationally.

Religious affiliations were 27.1% Christian, 1.3% Hindu, 0.3% Māori religious beliefs, 0.3% Buddhist, 0.3% New Age, and 0.5% other religions. People who answered that they had no religion were 64.5%, and 5.8% of people did not answer the census question.

Of those at least 15 years old, 141 (16.2%) people had a bachelor's or higher degree, 489 (56.2%) had a post-high school certificate or diploma, and 240 (27.6%) people exclusively held high school qualifications. The median income was $46,600, compared with $41,500 nationally. 120 people (13.8%) earned over $100,000 compared to 12.1% nationally. The employment status of those at least 15 was that 525 (60.3%) people were employed full-time, 126 (14.5%) were part-time, and 15 (1.7%) were unemployed.

== Marae ==
The Mangatangi Marae and Marae Kirikiri meeting house is a traditional meeting ground of Ngāti Tamaoho and the Waikato Tainui hapū of Ngāi Tai and Ngāti Koheriki.

In October 2020, the Government committed $2,584,751 from the Provincial Growth Fund to upgrade the marae and 7 other Waikato Tainui marae, creating 40 jobs.

== Education ==
Mangatangi School is a co-educational state full primary school covering years 1 to 8, with a roll of 105 as of July 2026. The school opened in 1919.
