= Waipapa River =

Waipapa River is the name of three rivers in New Zealand's North Island:

- Waipapa River (Northland)
- Waipapa River (Bay of Plenty)
- Waipapa River (Waikato)
