= Horotiu =

Town in Waikato, New Zealand

- Township
- Interactive map of Horotiu
- Coordinates: 37°41′55″S 175°11′44″E
- Country: New Zealand
- Region: Waikato
- District: Waikato District
- Wards: Newcastle-Ngāruawāhia General Ward; Tai Runga Takiwaa Maaori Ward
- Community: Ngāruawāhia Community
- Electorates: Taranaki-King Country; Hauraki-Waikato (Māori)

Government
  - Territorial Authority: Waikato District Council
  - Regional council: Waikato Regional Council
  - Mayor of Waikato: Aksel Bech
  - Taranaki-King Country MP: Barbara Kuriger
  - Hauraki-Waikato MP: Hana-Rawhiti Maipi-Clarke

Area
  - Territorial: 4.19 km^{2} (1.62 sq mi)
- Elevation: 25 m (82 ft)

Population (June 2025)
  - Territorial: 810
  - Density: 190/km^{2} (500/sq mi)
- Time zone: UTC+12 (NZST)
  - Summer (DST): UTC+13 (NZDT)

Horotiu is a small township on the west bank of the Waikato River in the Waikato District of New Zealand. It is on the Waikato Plains 13 km (8.1 mi) north of Hamilton and 5 km (3.1 mi) south of Ngāruawāhia. From early in the 20th century it developed around a freezing works and other industries.

The North Island Main Trunk railway runs through the town, as did State Highway 1 until opening of part of the Waikato Expressway in 2013. An hourly bus runs between Huntly and Hamilton.

== Name ==
The name, Horotiu, seems to have been used interchangeably with Waikato River, or Pukete. Its first use for the current township seems to occur in 1864, shortly after the invasion of the Waikato. Until then, Horotiu was the name of the upper Waikato river, where its current became faster and of Horotiu pā, on its banks, near Cambridge. An 1858 map only shows the name as Horotiu Plains in the area near the pā. The name, Horotiu, for the Waikato River, upstream from Ngāruawāhia, seems to have remained in use until the 1920s, though the 1859 map named it as Waikato.

Horotiu and Pukete parishes existed from at least 1867, but, until the 1900s, Horotiu was often referred to as Pukete, a name now used for the Hamilton suburb 6 km (3.7 mi) upstream. The railway station changed its name on 23 June 1907, when the proposed post office was referred to as Horotiu (Pukete), and the name of the school was changed from Pukete to Horotiu in 1911. The post office closed in 1988.

== History ==
Ngāti Hauā had a pā named Horotiu near Cambridge and they also had land in this area. The 1858 census put the Ngāti Hauā population at 1,399. By then they had seeded this area with European grasses. Their land was confiscated in 1864.

== Geography and geology ==
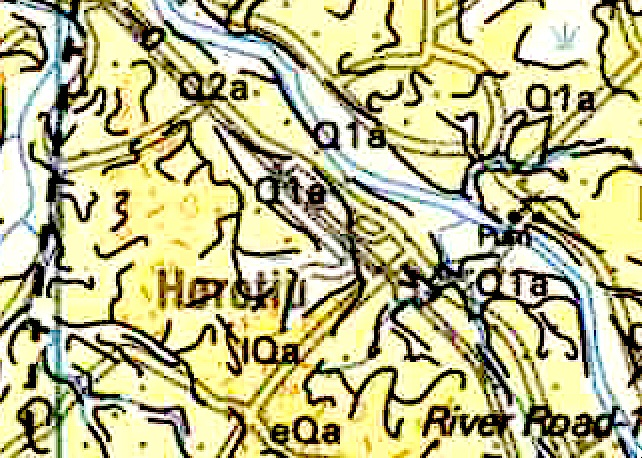
1:250,000

Taupō Pumice Alluvium (Q1a) was deposited on the Hinuera Formation (Q2a) until about 15,000 years ago. Some of the alluvium has been dug for sand and gravel. The Hinuera formation is also sand and gravel, interbedded with silt and some peat. In the last 14,000 years the Waikato River has cut into these formations, forming a low terrace and then cutting deeper.

The low ridge between the Waikato and Waipā rivers is made of Walton Subgroup (eQa – pumiceous fine-grained sand and silt with interbedded peat, pumiceous gravelly sand, diatomaceous mud, and non-welded ignimbrite and tephra), covered in places by Piako Subgroup (1Qa – Late Pleistocene, mainly locally derived, stream and coastal alluvium, and minor fans, with up to 20 m (66 ft) of unconsolidated to very soft, thinly to thickly bedded, yellow-grey to orange-brown, pumiceous mud, silt, sandy mud and gravel, with muddy peat in some valleys).

== Demographics ==
Stats NZ describes Horotiu as a rural settlement. It covers 4.19 km^{2} (1.62 sq mi) and had an estimated population of 810 as of June 2025, with a population density of 193 people per km^{2}.

Historical population
Year	Pop.	±% p.a.
2006	513	—
2013	507	−0.17%
2018	636	+4.64%
2023	678	+1.29%
The 2006 population is for a smaller area of 3.23 km^{2}. Source:

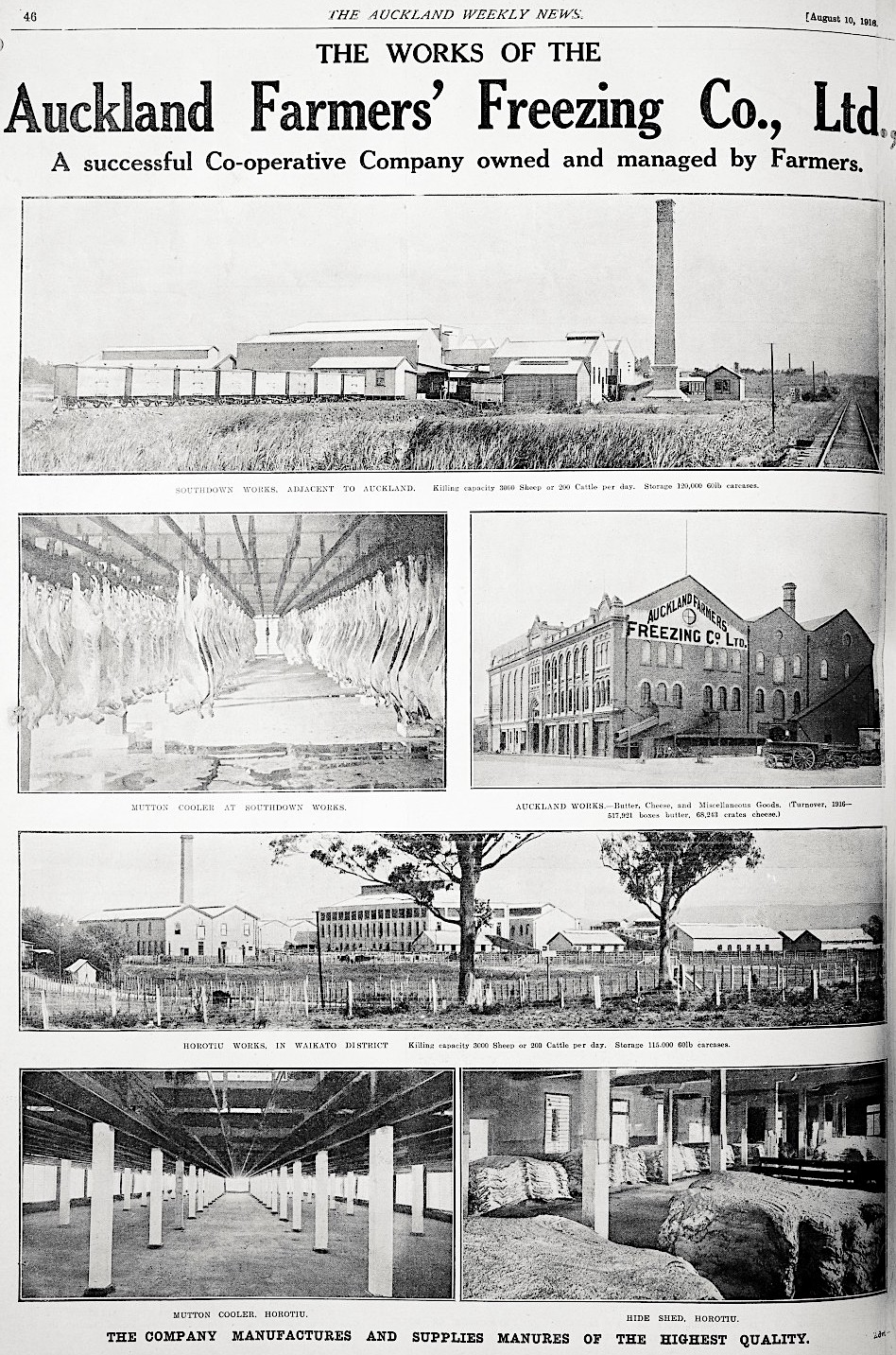
AFFCO opening year

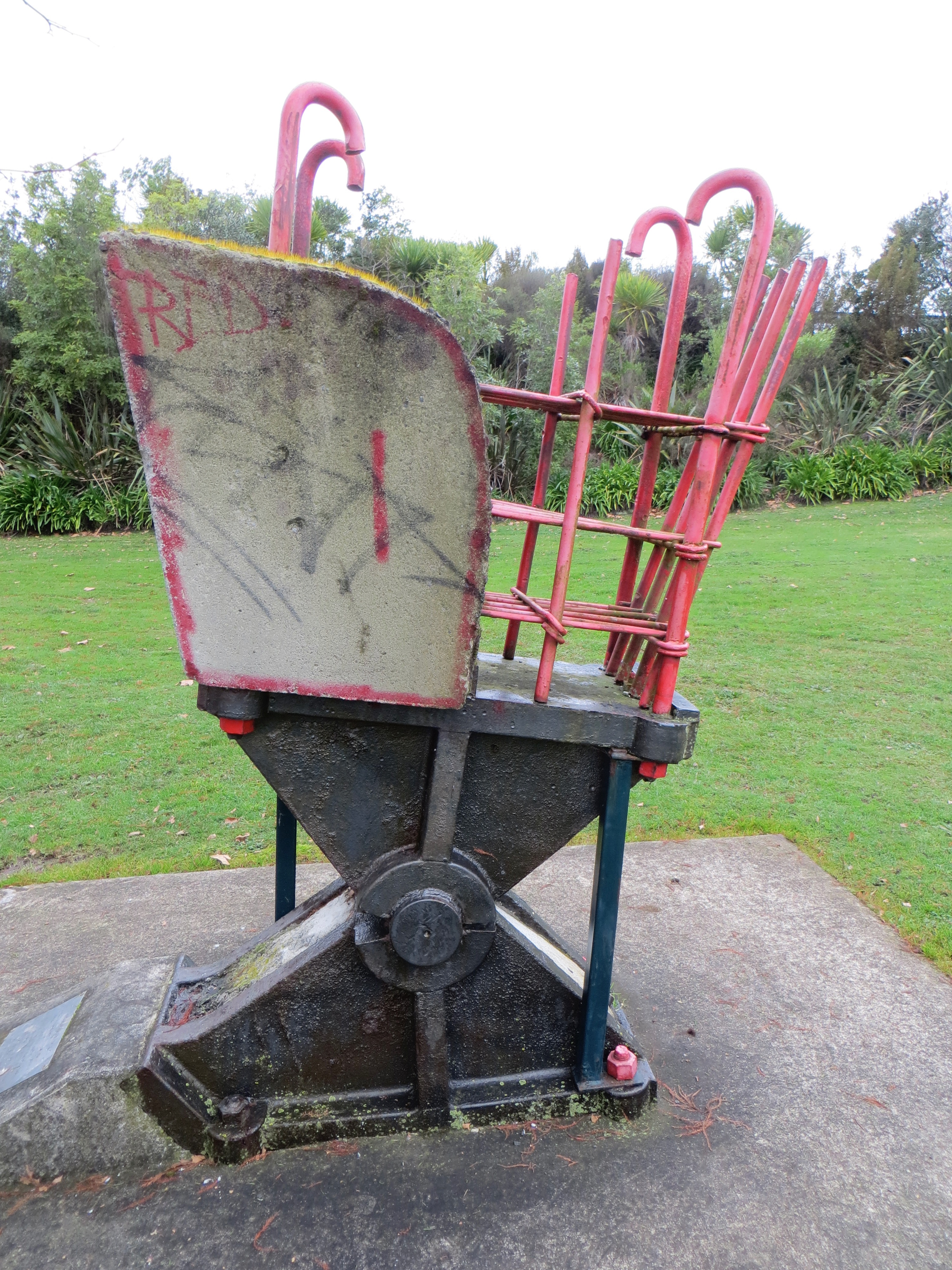
Remnant of Grade II bridge demolished 2001

Horotiu had a population of 678 in the 2023 New Zealand census, an increase of 42 people (6.6%) since the 2018 census, and an increase of 171 people (33.7%) since the 2013 census. There were 336 males and 339 females in 201 dwellings. 1.8% of people identified as LGBTIQ+. The median age was 34.4 years (compared with 38.1 years nationally). There were 147 people (21.7%) aged under 15 years, 141 (20.8%) aged 15 to 29, 324 (47.8%) aged 30 to 64, and 66 (9.7%) aged 65 or older.

People could identify as more than one ethnicity. The results were 73.5% European (Pākehā); 37.6% Māori; 4.9% Pasifika; 5.8% Asian; 0.4% Middle Eastern, Latin American and African New Zealanders (MELAA); and 2.7% other, which includes people giving their ethnicity as "New Zealander". English was spoken by 96.5%, Māori language by 11.9%, and other languages by 5.3%. No language could be spoken by 1.8% (e.g. too young to talk). New Zealand Sign Language was known by 0.9%. The percentage of people born overseas was 10.6, compared with 28.8% nationally.

Religious affiliations were 21.2% Christian, 1.3% Hindu, 0.9% Māori religious beliefs, 0.4% Buddhist, 0.4% Jewish, and 1.3% other religions. People who answered that they had no religion were 67.3%, and 7.1% of people did not answer the census question.

Of those at least 15 years old, 87 (16.4%) people had a bachelor's or higher degree, 315 (59.3%) had a post-high school certificate or diploma, and 132 (24.9%) people exclusively held high school qualifications. The median income was $50,300, compared with $41,500 nationally. 60 people (11.3%) earned over $100,000 compared to 12.1% nationally. The employment status of those at least 15 was that 336 (63.3%) people were employed full-time, 63 (11.9%) were part-time, and 9 (1.7%) were unemployed.

In 2018 the census unit was reduced to about half its previous area, losing most to the west of the railway to Te Kowhai area unit. Growth to 1,390 is planned by 2040.

== Economy ==
Auckland Farmers Cooperative (later Allied Farmers – AFFCO) bought 80 acres (32 ha) in 1914 and a riverside gravel pit in 1915. Horotiu Freezing Works opened on 17 January 1916. Horotiu still has AFFCO’s head office and its largest beef processing plant. The parent company, Talley's, opened a Waikato Dairy Co dried milk plant on the same site in August 2018. The area has long been associated with dairying, a casein factory having opened in 1919. AFFCO has long been involved with strikes and pollution.

By 1904 the area was recognised as a source of gravel and pits were established by 1907, especially on the east bank, and continue to produce aggregates and take in clean fill. Other landfilling ended in 2006, when a 1999 consent for a Hamilton City Council landfill expired. It had been started in October 1985 on a 95 ha (230 acres) sand pit (worked from about 1970 to 2000) and was replaced by Hampton Downs. It was closed earlier than originally planned, due to leachate problems. The 1999 consent required use of a vacuum to extract gas from the bores and leachate. Therefore, from November 2004 until 2012, when the emissions declined, methane from the landfill ran a 900kWe Waukesha VHP5904LTD Enginator gas engine generator set.

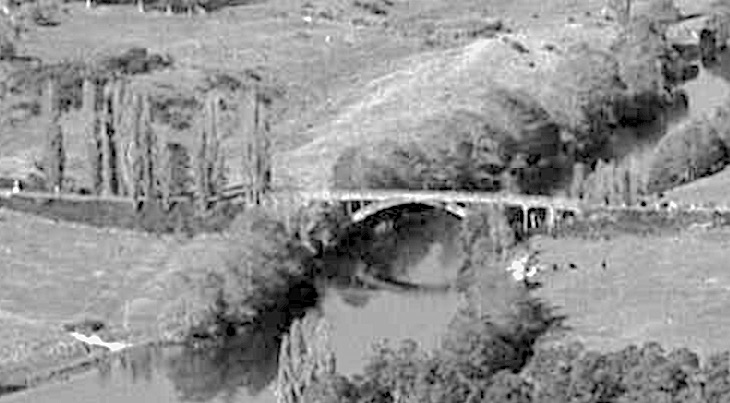
1921 bridge in 1963

Northgate business park, between Horotiu and Te Rapa, covers 109 ha (270 acres) and opened in 2013. Ports of Auckland have 33ha in Northgate for a freight hub.

Te Awa Lakes is a 100 ha (250 acres) site south east of Horotiu, beside the Waikato River. Development of a former sand and gravel pit started in 2021. It is planned to include shops, offices and 2,500 homes. An August 2023 City council meeting had a report that Te Awa Lakes could be the northern terminal of a bus rapid transit line to the airport.

== Cycleway ==
The Horotiu-Pukete section of Te Awa River Ride opened in 2013 and an extension to Ngāruawāhia opened on 2 November 2017.

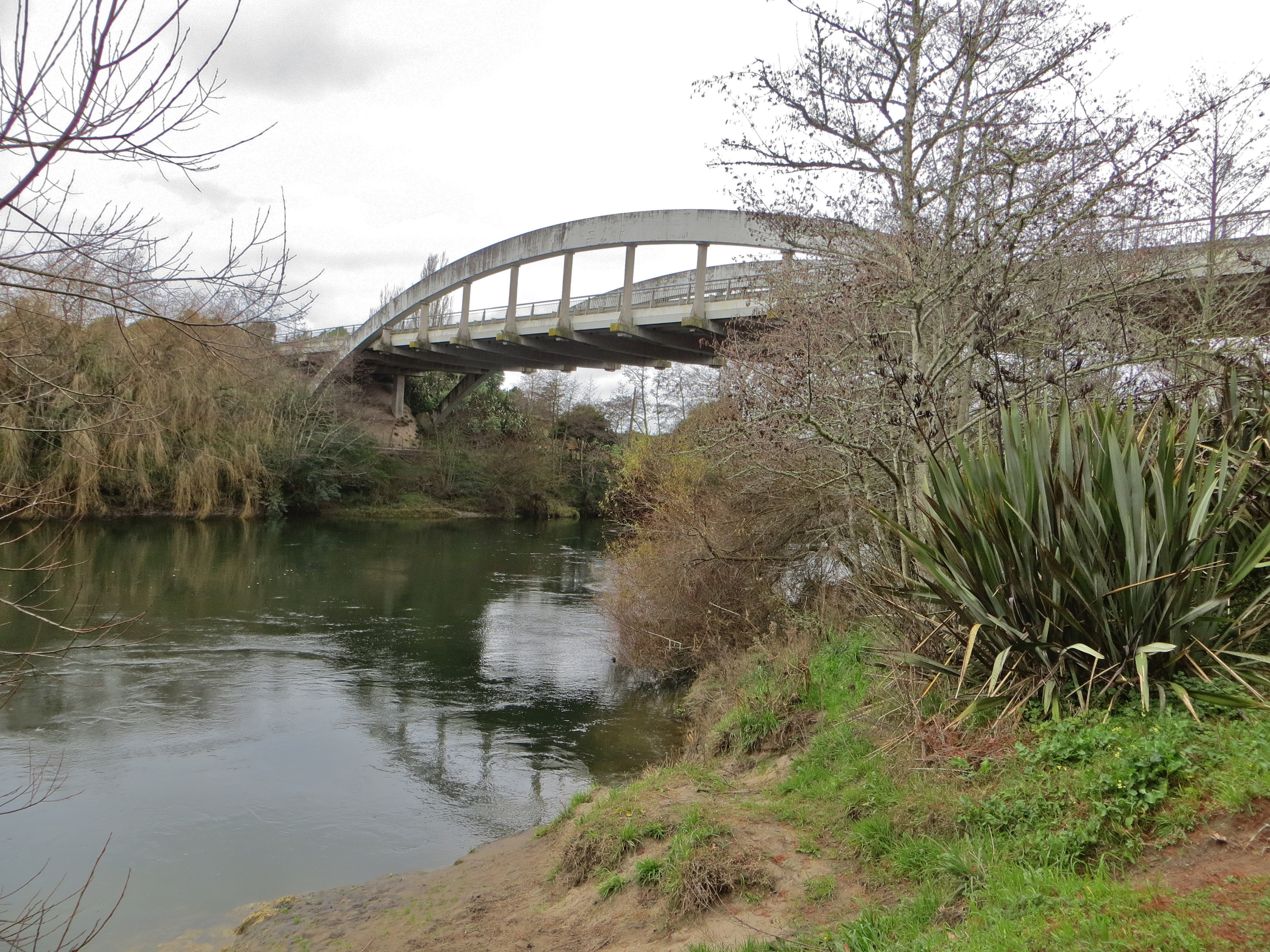
2001 bridge in 2014

== Bridges ==
Near Horotiu the Waikato is bridged by 2 roads and Te Awa cycleway. The next bridge upstream is Pukete sewer bridge and downstream, Ngāruawāhia road bridge.

=== 1921 Horotiu Bridge Rd ===
Construction started about 1920 of a reinforced concrete bridge, with a 25 ft (7.6 m) high arch, a main span of 126 ft (38 m), plus six approach spans of 24 ft (7.3 m), carrying a 16 ft (4.9 m) wide road. It was designed by Toogood and Jones, of Auckland, for £7900, paid by Waikato and Waipa County Councils, though government contributed £1,728. The bridge was completed in 1921, though the approaches took longer.

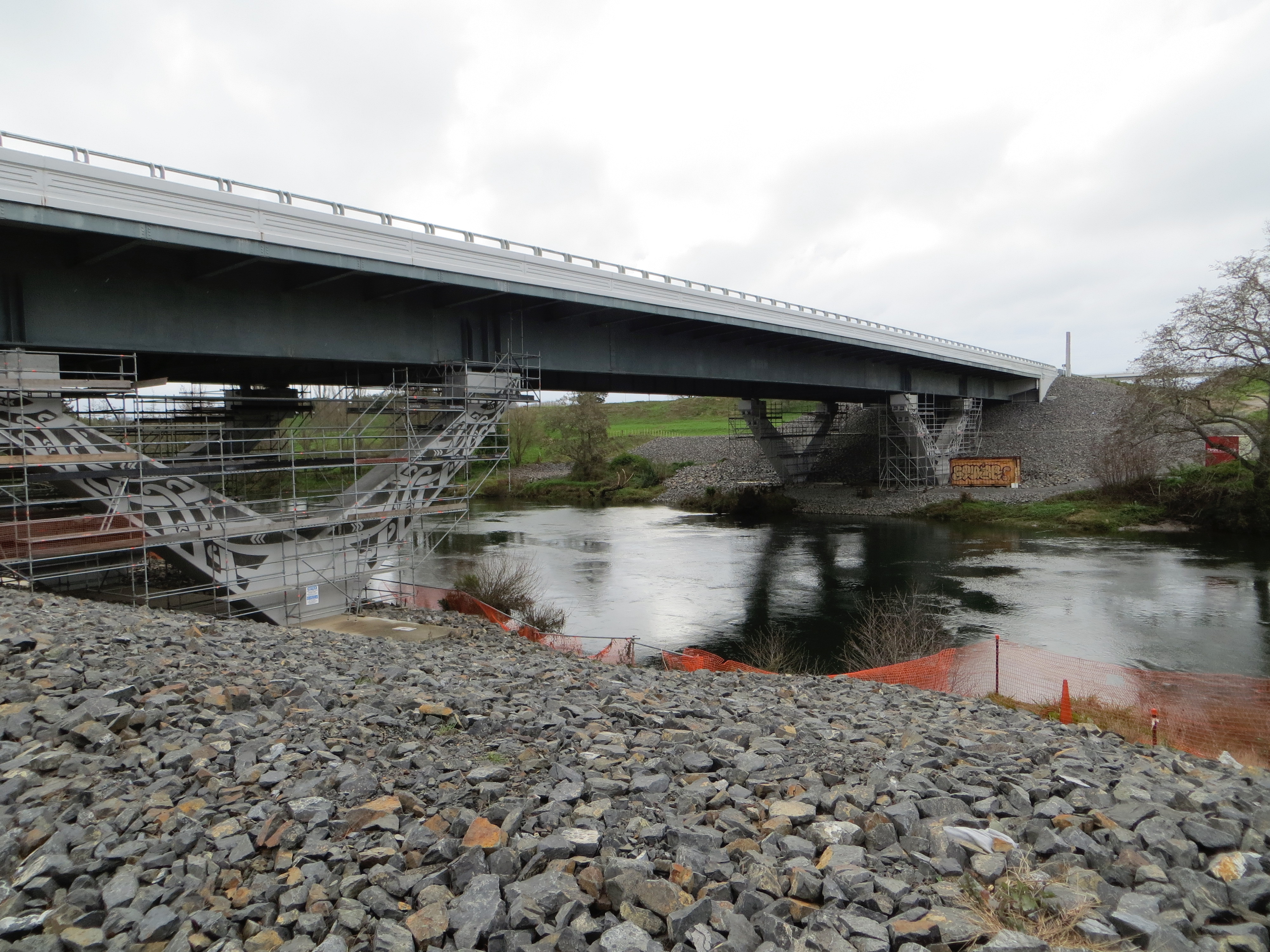
2013 Te Rehu O Waikato Bridge in 2014

=== 2001 Horotiu Bridge Rd ===
The Category II listed bridge was deemed unsafe and replaced in 2001. Annual average daily traffic flows were 3,565 in 2010, 4,432 in 2016 and 5,969 in 2018, of which about 12% were heavy vehicles.

=== 2013 Waikato Expressway bridge ===
The need for the 2001 bridge was reduced by the 142 m (466 ft) long 2013 Waikato Expressway Te Rehu O Waikato Bridge, built 400 m (1,300 ft) upstream. As part of the $200m road section, it used 800 tonnes of steel, including 56-tonne girders, resting on 4 x V-shaped piers, which allowed the main span to be reduced about 20m to 55 m (180 ft). Concrete pre-cast panels were added to them to carry the concrete deck and barriers.

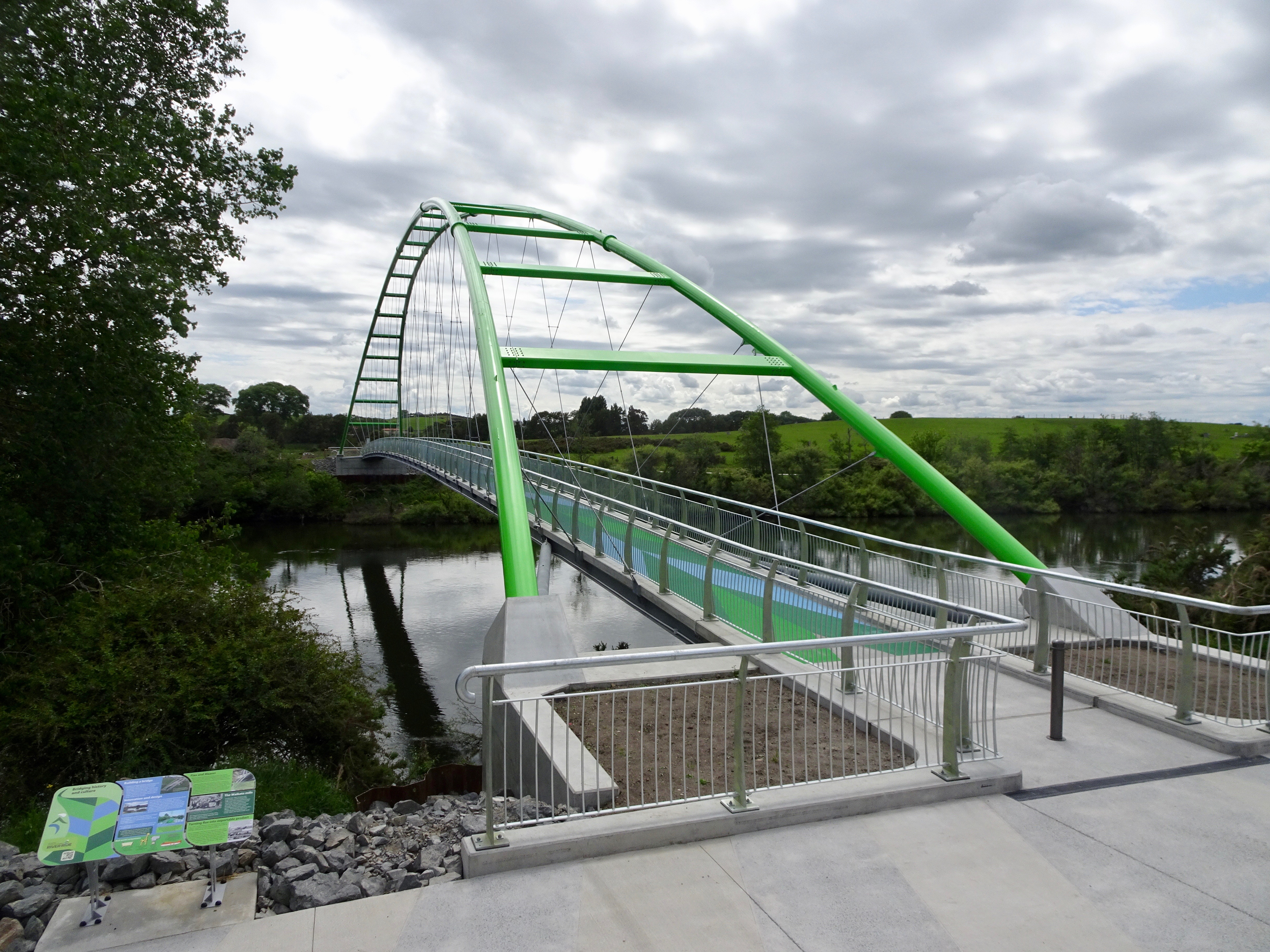
140m long, 2.5m wide, cycleway bridge

Annual average daily traffic flows 3.46 km south of Gordonton Rd Overbridge were -

Year	northbound	heavy	southbound	heavy
2014	5,747	16%	6,071	14%
2015	7,035	16%	7,062	14%
2016	7,913		8,142	
2017	8,528		8,527	
2018	8,600	16.8%	8,400	10.5%

=== 2017 cycleway ===
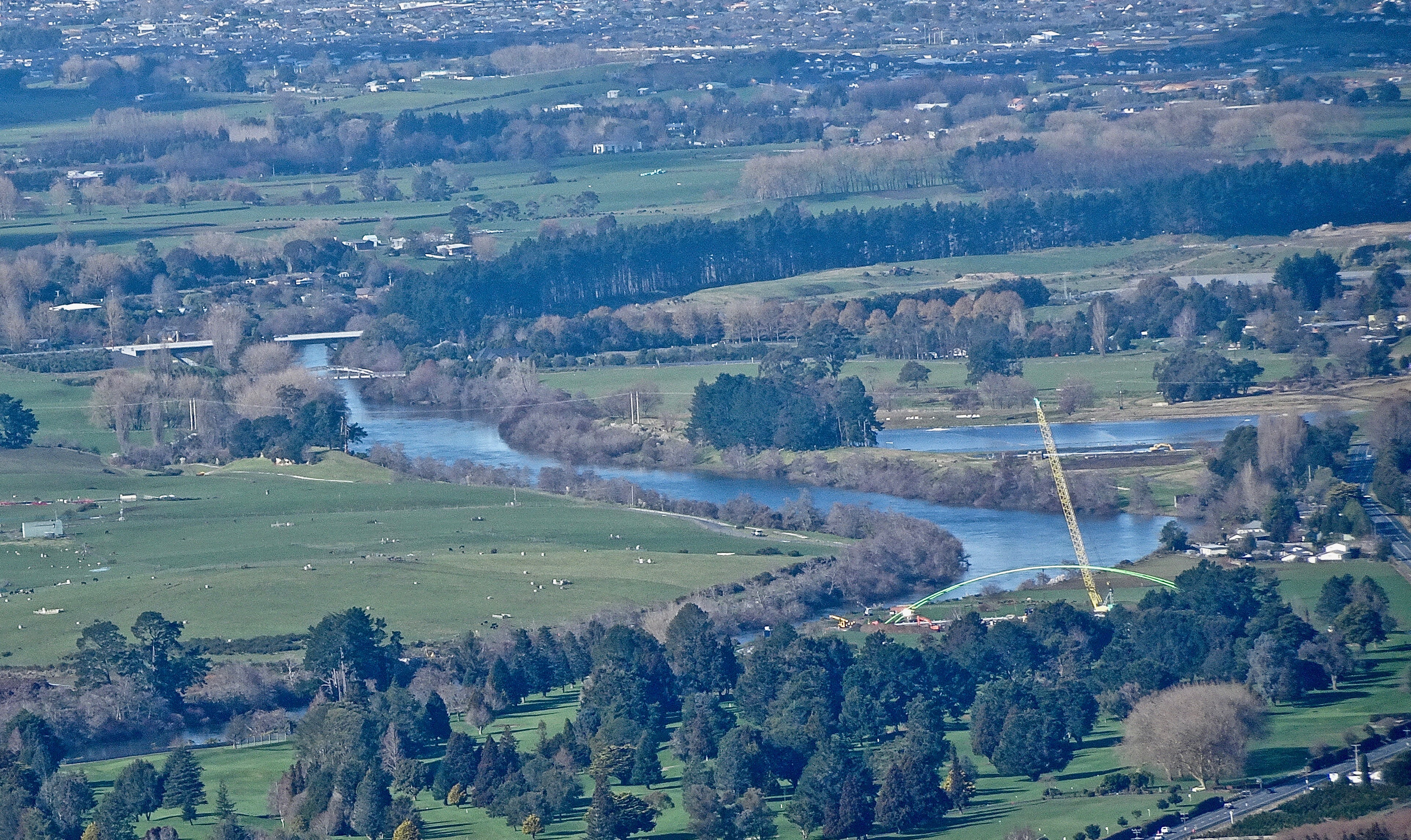
Te Awa cycle trail bridge being prepared for lifting into position July 2017, as seen from Hakarimata Range. Te Rehu O Waikato and Horotiu bridges in background.

The Te Awa cycle bridge is a 140m long, 2.5m wide, $1.3m cable network arch bridge, opened on Thursday 2 November 2017. The bridge is lit from a 9kWh battery, powered by 2 x 100 watt wind turbines and 2 x 250 watt solar panels on 7-metre high masts at the base of the bridge. Since opening the average weekly use by cyclists rose from 133 to 711 and by walkers from 348 to 391.

== Education ==
Horotiu School is a co-educational state primary school covering years 1 to 8 with a roll of 203 as of July 2026. The school dates back to 1879, following a government grant of the land in 1878.

Horotiu also has a playcentre.

== See also ==
- Horotiu Railway Station
