= Waipapa River (Waikato) =

River in New Zealand

Location
- Country: New Zealand

Physical characteristics
- Mouth
  - location: Lake Waipapa, Waikato River
  - coordinates: 38°18′04″S 175°40′51″E
- Length: 28 km (17 mi)

The southernmost and largest Waipapa River is a river of the Waikato region of New Zealand's North Island. It flows generally northeast from its origins to the south of the Pureora Forest Park, passing through the southeast corner of the park to reach Lake Waipapa on the Waikato River 10 kilometres northwest of Mangakino. The Waipapa flows into the Waikato River at Lake Waipapa, the hydro reservoir formed by the Waipapa Power Station.

== See also ==
- List of rivers of New Zealand
