= Waikato River =

Longest river in New Zealand

Coordinates: 37.3694°S 174.708°E

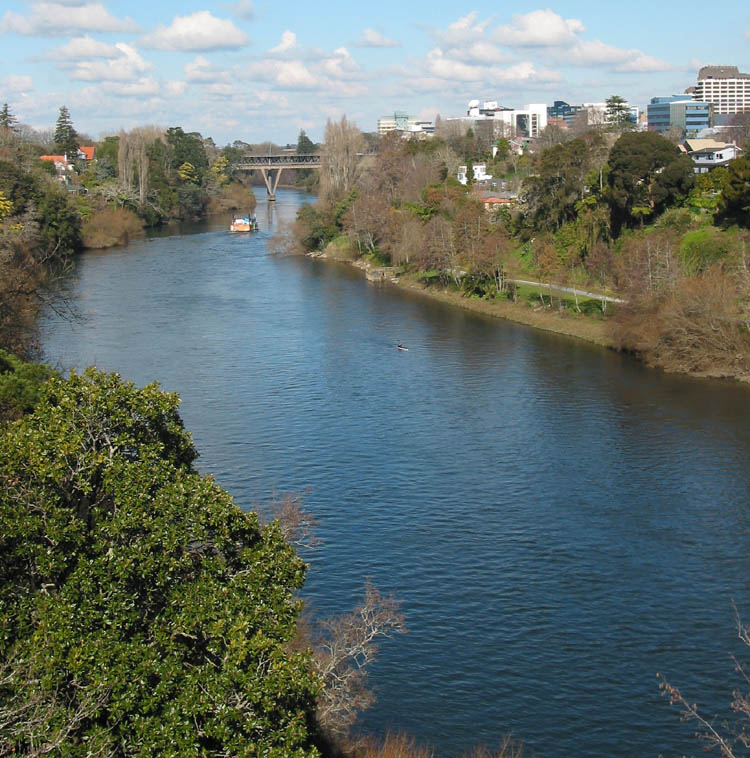
- The Waikato River passing through Hamilton
- Interactive map of the Waikato River

Location
- Country: New Zealand

Physical characteristics
- Source
  - location: Lake Taupō
- Mouth
  - location: Port Waikato
  - elevation: 0.0 metres (0 ft)
- Length: 425 kilometres (264 mi)
- Basin size: 13,701 km^{2} (5,290 sq mi) to Mercer
- Discharge
  - average: 327 m^{3}/s (11,500 cu ft/s)

The Waikato River is the longest in New Zealand, running for 425 kilometres (264 mi) through the North Island. It starts on the eastern slopes of Mount Ruapehu, joining the Tongariro River system and flowing through Lake Taupō, New Zealand's largest lake. It then drains Taupō at the lake's northeastern edge, creates the Huka Falls, and flows northwest through the Waikato Plains. It empties into the Tasman Sea south of Auckland, at Port Waikato. It gives its name to the Waikato region that surrounds the Waikato Plains. The present course of the river was largely formed about 17,000 years ago. Contributing factors were climate warming, the reestablishment of forests in the river headwaters, and the deepening, rather than widening, of the existing river channel. The channel was gradually eroded as far upriver as Piarere, leaving the old Hinuera channel through the Hinuera Gap high and dry. The remains of the old course are seen clearly at Hinuera, where the cliffs mark the ancient river edges. The Waikato's main tributary is the Waipā River, which converges with it at Ngāruawāhia.

The name Waikato comes from the Māori language and translates as flowing water. The Waikato River has spiritual meaning for various local Māori tribes, including the large Tainui, who regard it as a source of their mana, or pride. The widely respected marae of Tūrangawaewae is close to its banks at Ngāruawāhia.

For many years the Tainui tribe have sought to reestablish their links to the river after the New Zealand Wars (see Invasion of the Waikato) and the subsequent confiscations of the 1860s, and are continuing negotiations with the New Zealand government. The Tainui iwi was advised not to bring a case for the river before the Waitangi Tribunal as they would not win. An out-of-court settlement was arranged, and the deed of settlement signed by the Crown and Waikato-Tainui in August 2008 settled the raupatu claim to the Waikato River. However, other claims for land blocks and harbours are still outstanding. Waikato-Tainui now have joint management of the river with Waikato Regional Council.

== Origin ==
The ancestral Waikato River flowed from an ancient lake (Lake Huka) in the centre of the North Island through deep gorges of welded ignimbrite and rhyolite, northward through the Hinuera Valley and Hauraki Basin into the Thames Estuary. It is possible that the river flowed through the Waikato Basin about a million years ago before returning to its Hinuera course. After the huge Oruanui eruption 27,000 years ago, ignimbrite was showered all over the North Island to a thickness of 200 metres (660 ft). A new lake was formed – Lake Taupō. The water accumulated until a new outlet was forced 120 metres (390 ft) above the present lake level, near Waihora Bay. Over the next few thousand years, the bed of the river was raised by large amounts of eruption debris. Then the original, blocked outlet suddenly gave way; the lake level fell 75 metres (246 ft) as about 80 cubic kilometres (19 mi^{3}) of water and debris poured out in a catastrophic breakthrough flood, causing the river to change course near Piarere. The Hinuera Gap and Waitoa River are evidence of the river's former course. The water level dropped quickly, and the river stayed in this new course through the Maungatautari Gorge and Hamilton Basin. Deposits show that the Waikato River was already in the Waikato Basin 21,800 years ago.

== Course ==
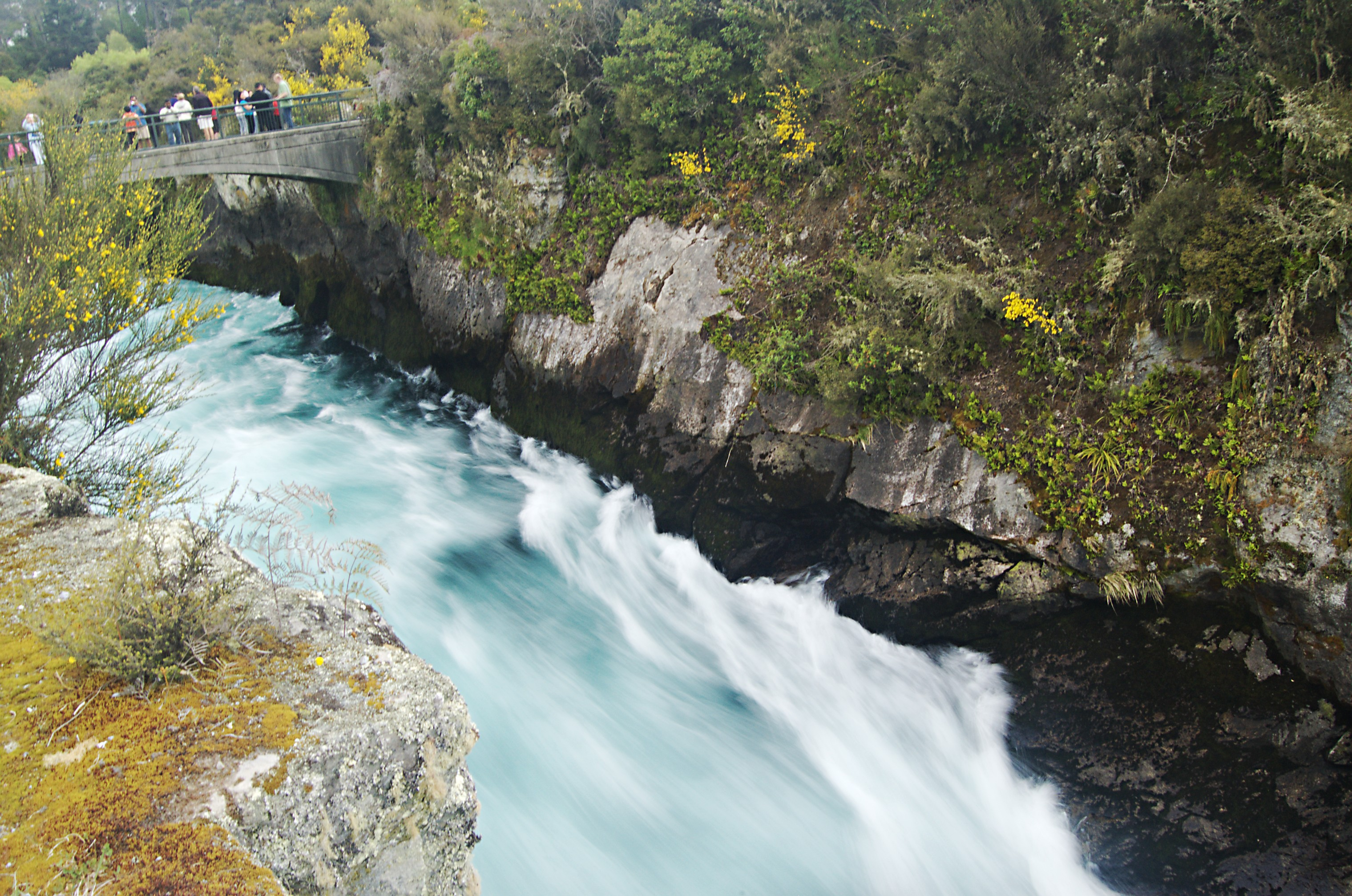
The Waikato River rushing through the Huka Falls canyon at Taupō

The mouth and estuary at Port Waikato

The river starts in the form of many small streams on the eastern slopes of Mount Ruapehu. The Mangatoetoenui Glacier (once also called the Waikato Glacier) is one of the principal sources. The southernmost tributary is called the Upper Waikato Stream. The Waipakihi River joins the Waikato from the Kaimanawa Mountains to the west. From the point where the river meets the Waihohonu Stream, down to Lake Taupō, it has been formally named the Tongariro River since 1945.

The Poutu Stream joins from Lake Rotoaira to the east, as a tributary of the Tongariro, which flows northward, with State Highway 1 in parallel, through the town of Tūrangi, and into the southern side of Lake Taupō. Extensive engineering of lakes, tunnels and canals are used to generate hydroelectric power in the Tongariro Power Scheme.

The Waikato River flows out of Lake Taupō at the town of Taupō in Tapuaeharuru Bay at the northeast end of the lake. It flows northeast past the town, alongside State Highway 1, to the Huka Falls. State Highway 5 runs more or less parallel to the river as it flows further northeast. About 40 kilometres (25 mi) from the lake, the river flows west and into the southern end of Lake Ohakuri. It exits from the northwest end of that lake. It flows west through the small Lake Atiamuri and into the long east–west oriented Lake Whakamaru, with State Highway 30 following its course. It passes northwest through Lake Maraetai and Lake Waipapa, where it is joined by the Waipapa River, then north through Lake Arapuni and into Lake Karapiro. Pokaiwhenua Stream joins the river in Lake Karapiro. Nine hydroelectric power stations at eight dams extract energy from the river between Taupō and Karapiro. All the lakes in this stretch of the river (apart from Lake Taupō) are artificial.

The river leaves the Volcanic Plateau at Karapiro, where it emerges from the Maungatautari Gorge. It flows northwest into the Waikato Basin, passing through the towns of Cambridge, Hamilton, and Ngāruawāhia. It is joined by its largest tributary, the Waipā River, at Ngāruawāhia. It then flows north through the Taupiri Gorge to enter the lower Waikato region. Further north is Huntly and then Meremere, where the Whangamarino and Maramarua Rivers join it. From Mercer, where the Mangatawhiri River joins it, the Waikato flows west and southwest. Just before its mouth at Port Waikato, the Araroa River joins from the north. Numerous small islands lie in the long, thin delta of the river as it passes through low-lying swampy land between Meremere and the coast, the largest of which is Motutieke Island.

There are also over 40 islands between Ngāruawāhia and Tuakau, depending on the level of the river. Maurea Islands, just south of Rangiriri, were subject to a restoration trial to test comparative weed treatments, the main weeds being alder and yellow flag iris.

In prehistoric times, the Waikato's course has occasionally shifted to flow north through the Hinuera Gap into the Firth of Thames and from there into the Hauraki Gulf / Tīkapa Moana. The most recent occasion this is known to have occurred ended some 20,000 years ago, although it is possible that it also flowed north more recently, until about 1800 years ago. A remnant of this former course can be seen as a spur on Lake Karapiro to the south of the settlement of Piarere. The river's current course is largely the result of the massive Hatepe eruption of the Taupō Volcano in 180 AD.

The mean discharge of the Waikato River is 340 cubic metres per second (12,000 cu ft/s), with the highest flows typically occurring in July and August. Specific mean annual floods are low (60–70 L s-1 km-2), and the frequency of events with greater than 3 times the median flow is 0.4 events/year, due to flow regulation and groundwater storage in pumice.

== Human use ==
As well as being a water and recreation resource, the river was historically a critical communications and transport link for the communities along it. It took about 3 days to paddle a waka from Waiuku to the Cambridge/Te Awamutu area. Taupō, Mangakino, Cambridge, Hamilton, Horotiu, Ngāruawāhia, Huntly, Hampton Downs, Meremere, Waiuku and Port Waikato are on or close to it. Rowers, kayakers and powered pleasure craft frequently use the Waikato River in Hamilton. Water-skiers and jet skis have zones outside the city limits where they can be used.

The river was of military importance in the land wars between New Zealand settlers and Kingitanga forces during 1863–64, and significant battles were fought. Three shallow draft gunboats were designed in New Zealand and built in Sydney in kitset form; the hulk of the paddle steamer Rangiriri is preserved at Hamilton. In addition locally sourced barges were rebuilt with steel plating to carry troops and supplies. In support of these invasions, New Zealand developed its first "navy", the Waikato Flotilla, run by an Australian, Francis Cadell, who was presented with a gold watch and diamonds by the New Zealand government in recognition of his service. A cemetery containing the graves of the British military dead can be found at Rangiriri opposite the hotel, shops and cafe.

=== Electricity generation ===
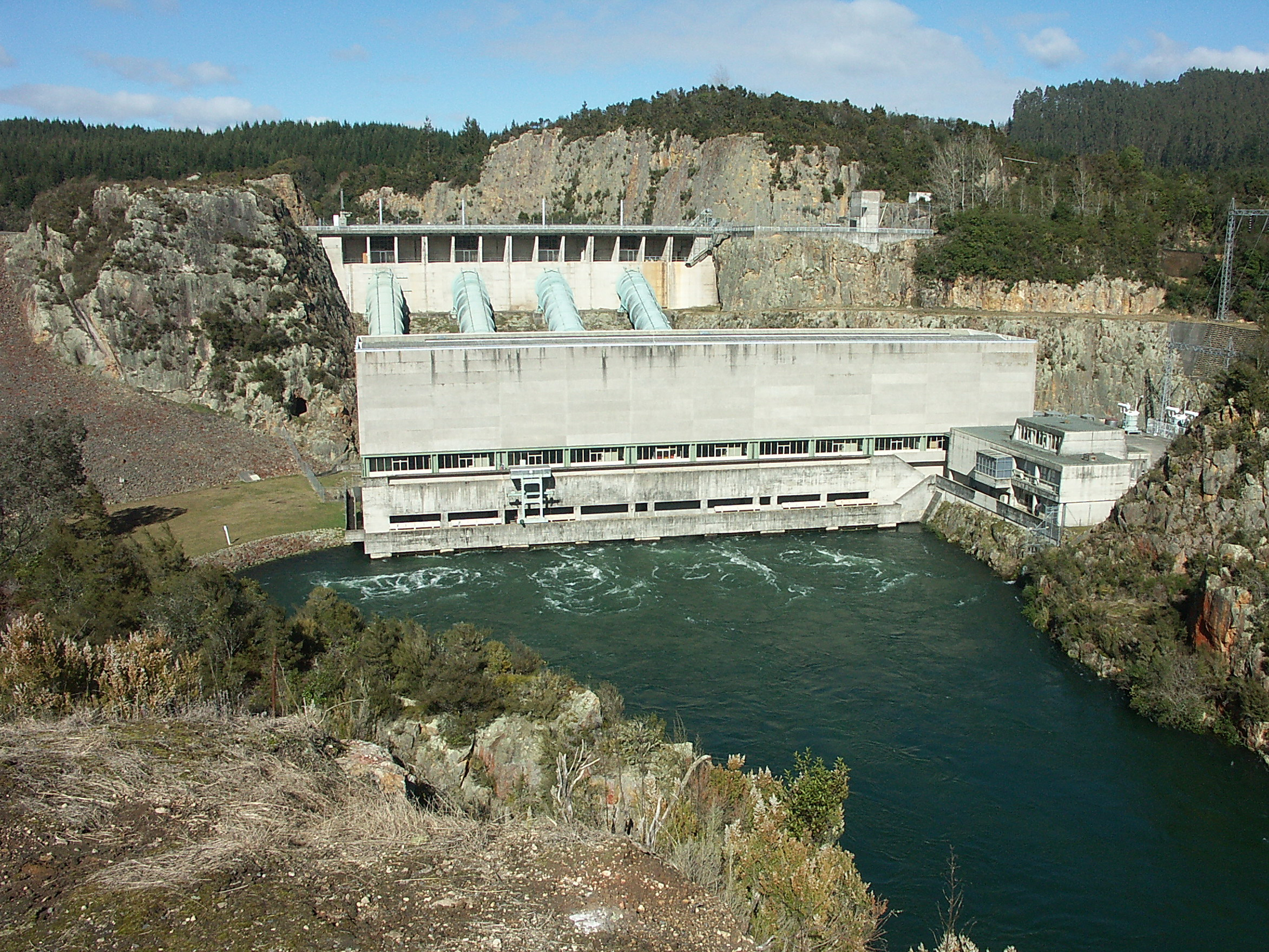
Ohakuri Dam, midway between Taupō, Rotorua and Hamilton

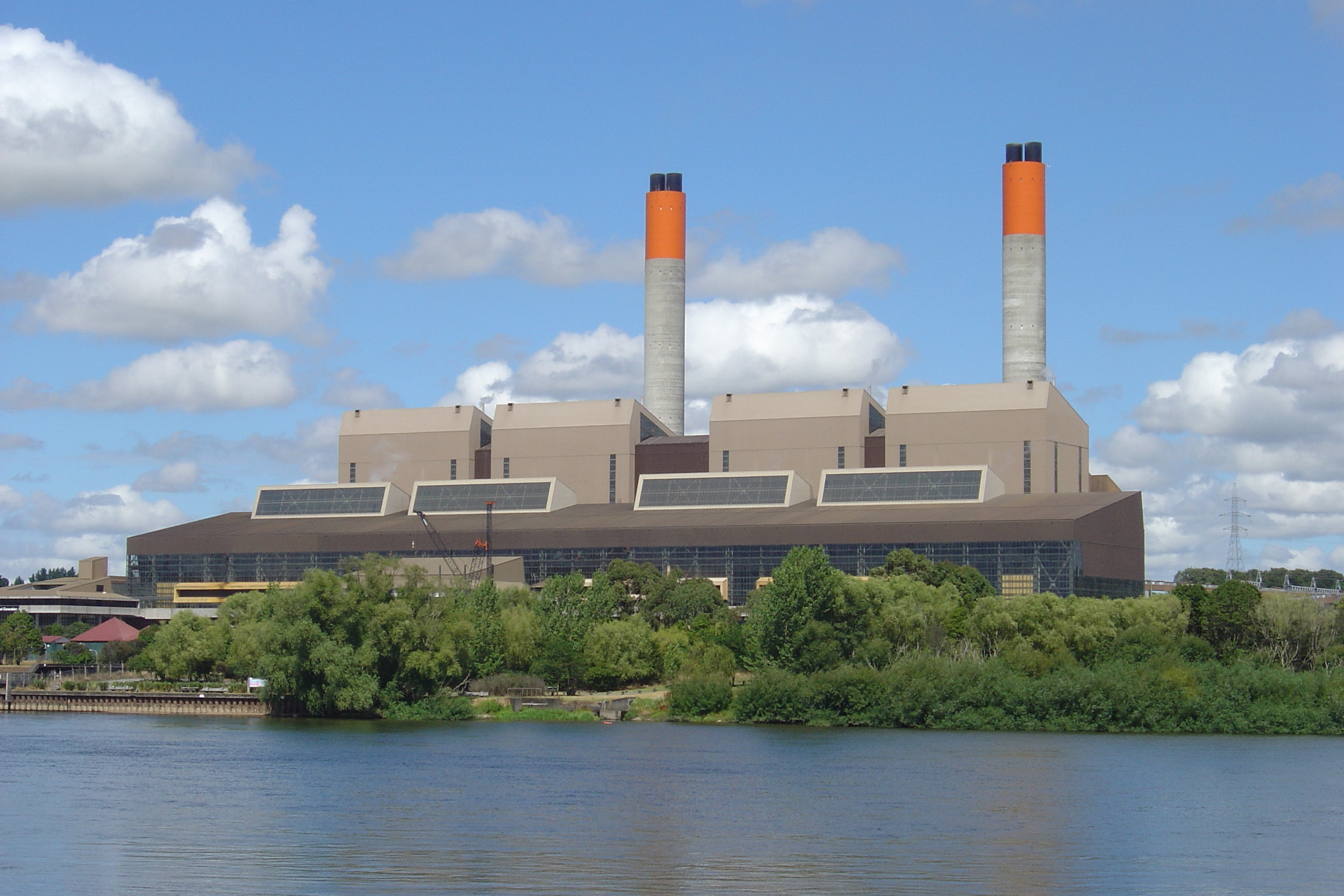
Huntly Power Station uses water from the Waikato River for cooling

The Waikato's first hydroelectric power station was the Horahora Power Station, now located under the Horahora bridge deep beneath the surface of Lake Karapiro. Horahora was built to supply electricity for the Martha gold mines at Waihi.

The river has a series of eight dams and nine hydroelectric power stations that generate electricity for the national grid. These were constructed between 1929 and 1971 to meet growing demand for electricity.

The power scheme begins at Lake Taupō, which has control gates to regulate the flow of water into the river. Once released through the gates it takes over 18 hours for the water to flow to the last power station at Karapiro. On its journey downstream it passes through power stations at Aratiatia, Ohakuri, Atiamuri, Whakamaru, Maraetai, Waipapa, Arapuni and Karapiro.

The scheme's nine stations generate on average around 10% of New Zealand's annual electricity supply.

The river also provides cooling water for the coal/natural gas fired thermal power station at Huntly. The power station uses river water as a cooling medium for the old steam units, which means that large quantities of warm water are returned to the river. To limit environmental impacts, conditions are imposed by its resource consent, specifying the quantity of water that can be removed by the station along with the maximum temperature of the water when returned to the river, 25 °C (77 °F). These conditions mean that output of the older steam units can be restricted, especially on very hot summer days. In 2006, a cooling tower was installed. This allows one 250 MW unit to run at full load even during such times.

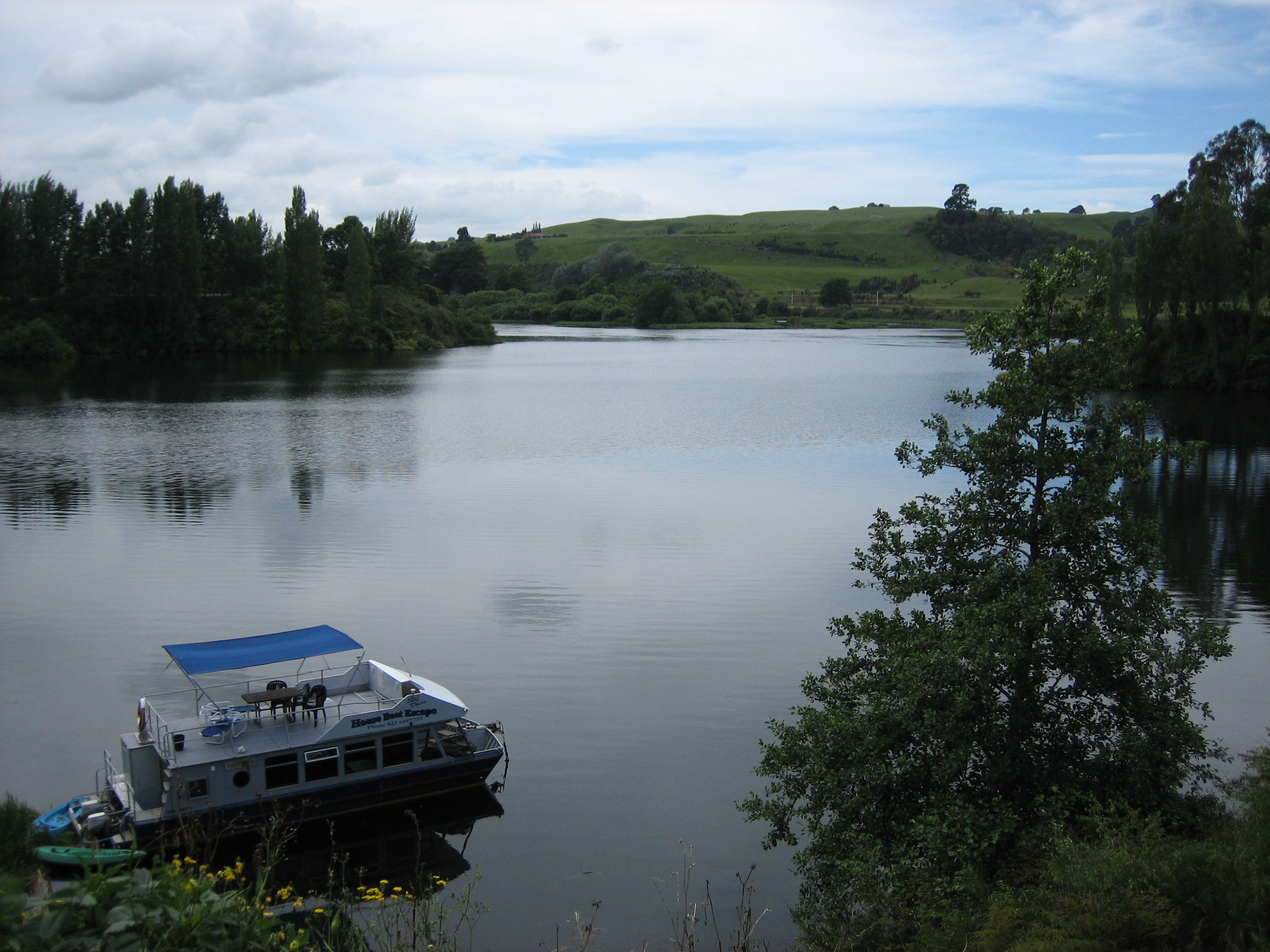
A boat on Lake Karapiro

=== Drinking water ===
After widescale droughts in 1994, the use of the Waikato River to supply drinking water for Auckland was first considered. In July 2002, a water treatment plant was opened at Tuakau, which was expanded in 2021 after major droughts in 2020.

=== Recreation ===
The lower Waikato is popular for duck shooting.

==== Boating ====
The Waikato is renowned among whitewater kayaking enthusiasts, specifically for the Full James rapid located north of Taupō. The Full James was the site of the 1999 World Whitewater Championships, as well as the pre-World event the year before.

Lake Karapiro (an artificial lake) is regarded as one of New Zealand's best rowing venues. The World Rowing Championships in 1978 and 2010, and the 1950 British Empire Games were hosted at Karapiro.

The section of the river that flows through Hamilton has the most diverse river traffic, with many schools and clubs using rowing skiffs. Rowing races are also held on the river. Jet skis are confined to the city margins because of their noise. Power boats regularly use the river, including manufacturers and boating shops testing and demonstrating boats, especially in summer. In addition, there are numerous kayaks and a few waka.

There are council boat ramps, run by Waikato District, Hamilton City, South Waikato District and Taupō District, at Port Waikato Rd; Hoods Landing Rd, Otaua; Elbow Rd, Aka aka; River Rd, Tuakau; Riverbank Rd, Mercer; Churchill East Rd, Rangiriri; Ohinewai Landing Rd; Boatie Reserve SH1, Parry St and Riverview Rd, Huntly; SH1 Taupiri; Waikato Esplanade, Ngāruawāhia; Farm and Braithwaite Parks, Pukete; Swarbricks Landing, Hamilton Pde, Pine Beach, Ferrybank, Memorial Park, Roose Commerce Park, Hayes Paddock, Hamilton Gardens; Narrows Lane, Tamahere; Karapiro (6 ramps); Arapuni (4); Maraetai; Whakamaru (3); Ohakuri and Mangakino.

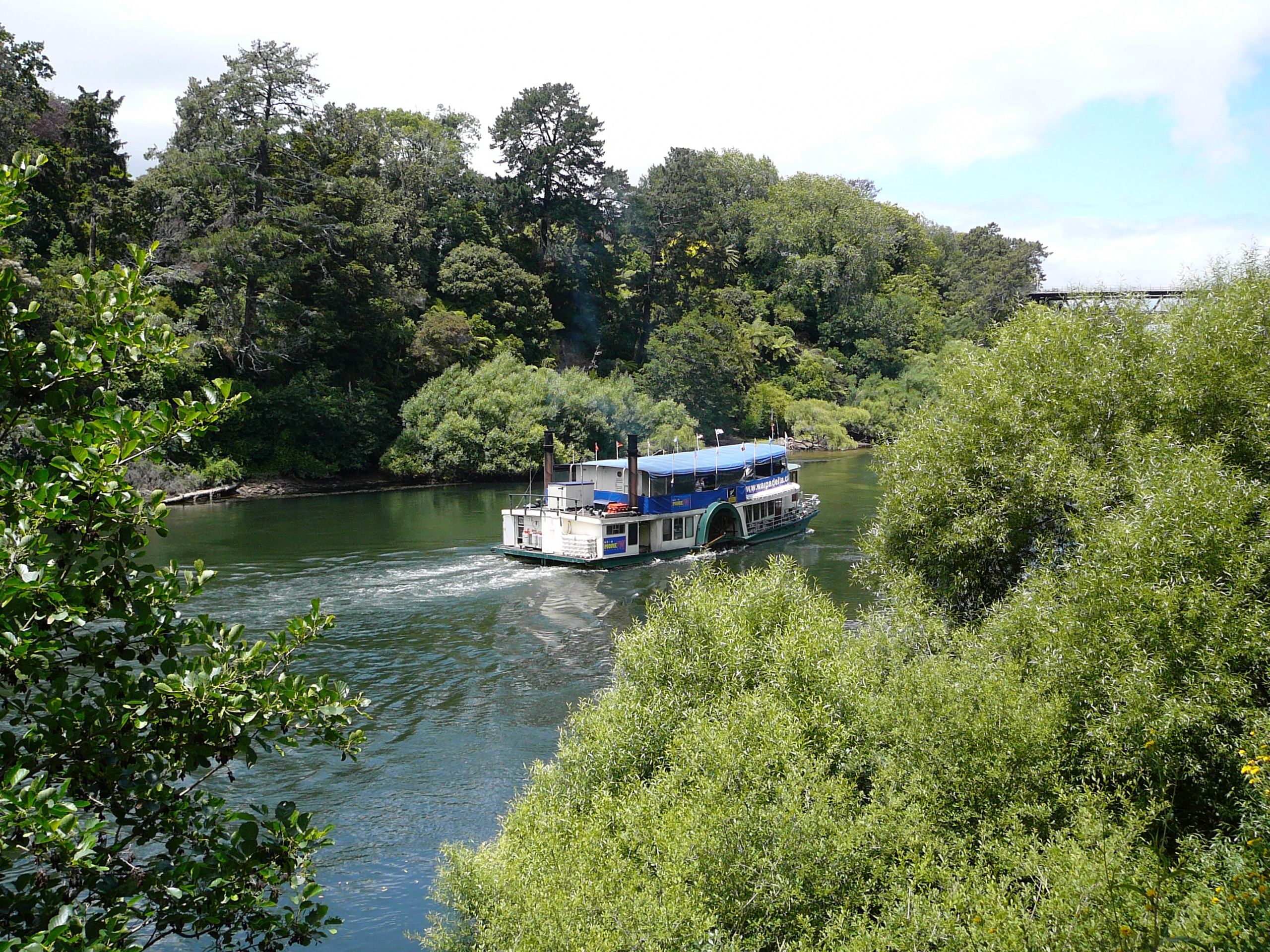
Waipa Delta ran cruises on the Waikato River at Hamilton from 1985 to 2009

==== Public cruises ====
A ferry service along part of its length was for years conducted by Caesar Roose, several of whose descendants still live beside it. He brought the 1894 400-passenger steamer Manuwai from the Whanganui in 1920. In 1924 a Cambridge to Port Waikato excursion was being run 2 or 3 times a year, taking 12 to 14 hours downstream and a few hours longer upstream; for example steamers in 1939 took about 90 minutes from Ngāruawāhia to Hamilton. Manuwai sank at her moorings in 1938, but was taken to Mercer for repair in 1939, where she was converted to a barge. Several of the old steamers remain under, or beside the river, including the Manuwai, Rawhiti (built 1925) and Freetrader on the west bank just south of Mercer. A 1928 article listed 14 boats that had provided river services. To improve navigation, rocks in the Narrows at Tamahere were removed in 1919.

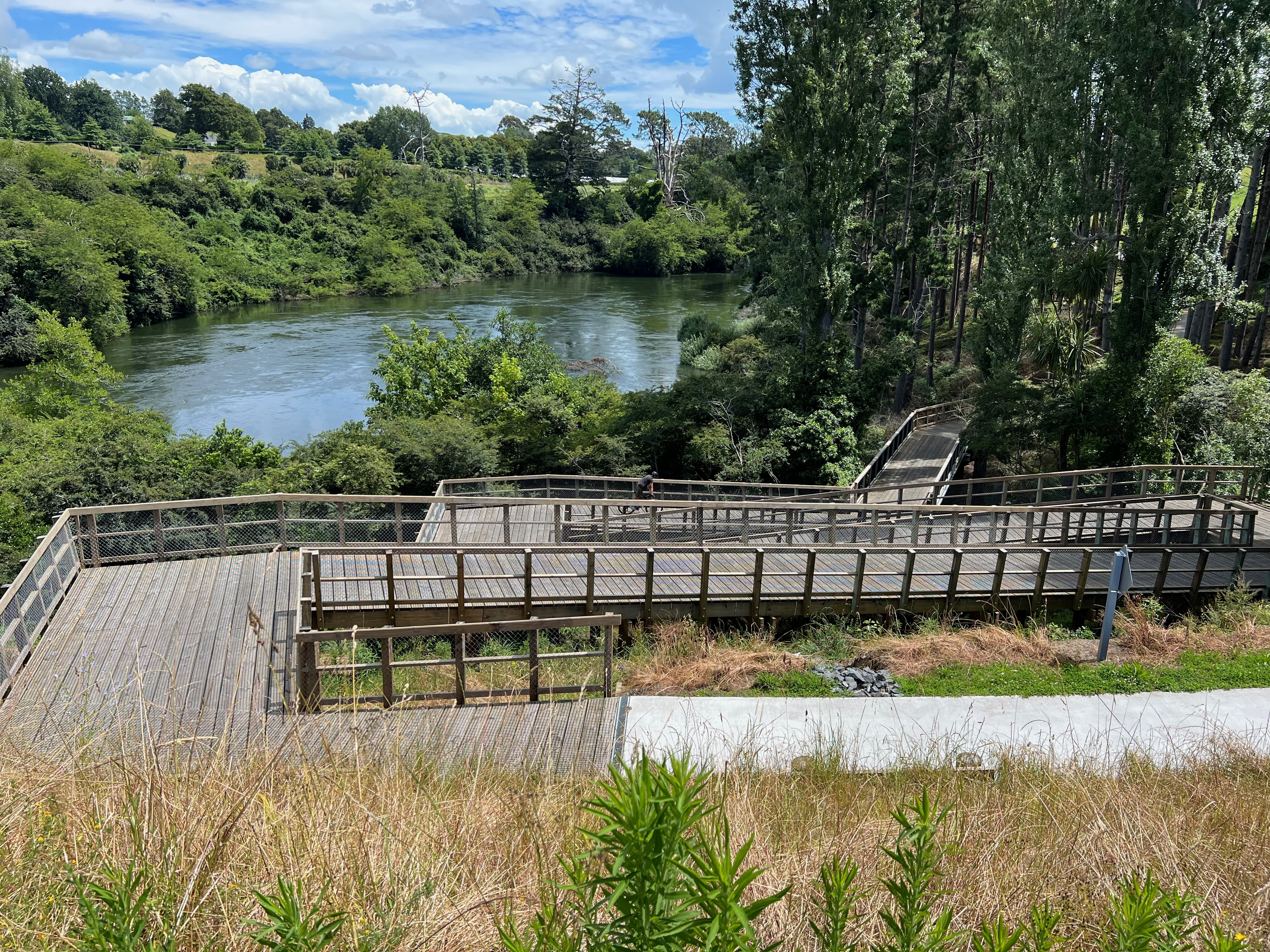
The last section of Te Awa cycleway from Hamilton to Cambridge includes extensive lengths of boardwalk

Public cruises operate from Aratiatia to Huka Falls, across the river to Orakei Korako, from Hamilton Gardens to Mystery Creek and Fairfield Bridge and, since 2009, from Tuakau to Port Waikato.

On 19 July 2021 a ferry service began on the river in Hamilton, linking Swarbrick's Landing and Braithwaite Park with the museum and gardens. Services ended with liquidation of the company in September 2022.

==== Cycle and walk trails ====
Three trails follow parts of the river.

Boosted by New Zealand Cycle Trail funding, the Waikato River Trails, a 100-kilometre (62 mi) series of connected river cycling trails in the South Waikato. The River Trail has five sections, open to both walkers or bikes, between Lake Karapiro and Aratiatia. It opened in 2011.

Te Awa River Ride runs for 65 km (40 mi) following the river from Horahora, near the end of the Waikato River Trails, via Cambridge and Hamilton to Ngāruawāhia. Completion was planned for 2017, but the Cambridge-Hamilton section opening was further delayed from 2021 and opened on 9 December 2022. North of AFFCO at Horotiu, the route includes the second longest cycle bridge in the country (after the Timber Trail), a 140 m (150 yd) long cable network arch bridge, budgeted to cost $2.6m and to open in August, but opened in November 2017. The section from the Avantidrome through St Peter's School of Cambridge and Tamahere was being constructed in 2019/2020, including an underpass at SH21 to Tamahere Park.

Te Araroa (the walkway running the length of the country) follows the Waikato for most of its 80 kilometres (50 mi) between Mercer and Hamilton.

== Ecology ==
=== Species ===
The Waikato River and its hydro lakes are home to at least 19 types of native fish and 10 types of introduced fish. The introduced species include rainbow and brown trout providing what has been called "the finest fly-fishing in the world". Other introduced species, like the carp and mosquitofish, have become major pests.

The invasive gold clam (Corbicula fluminea) was first detected in Lake Karapiro in 2023. The species has been found in large numbers along the river from the mouth at Port Waikato, to upstream Lake Maraetai near Taupō. The presence of the clams is leading to reduced levels of calcium carbonate and increased levels of carbon dioxide in the water.

=== Environmental issues ===
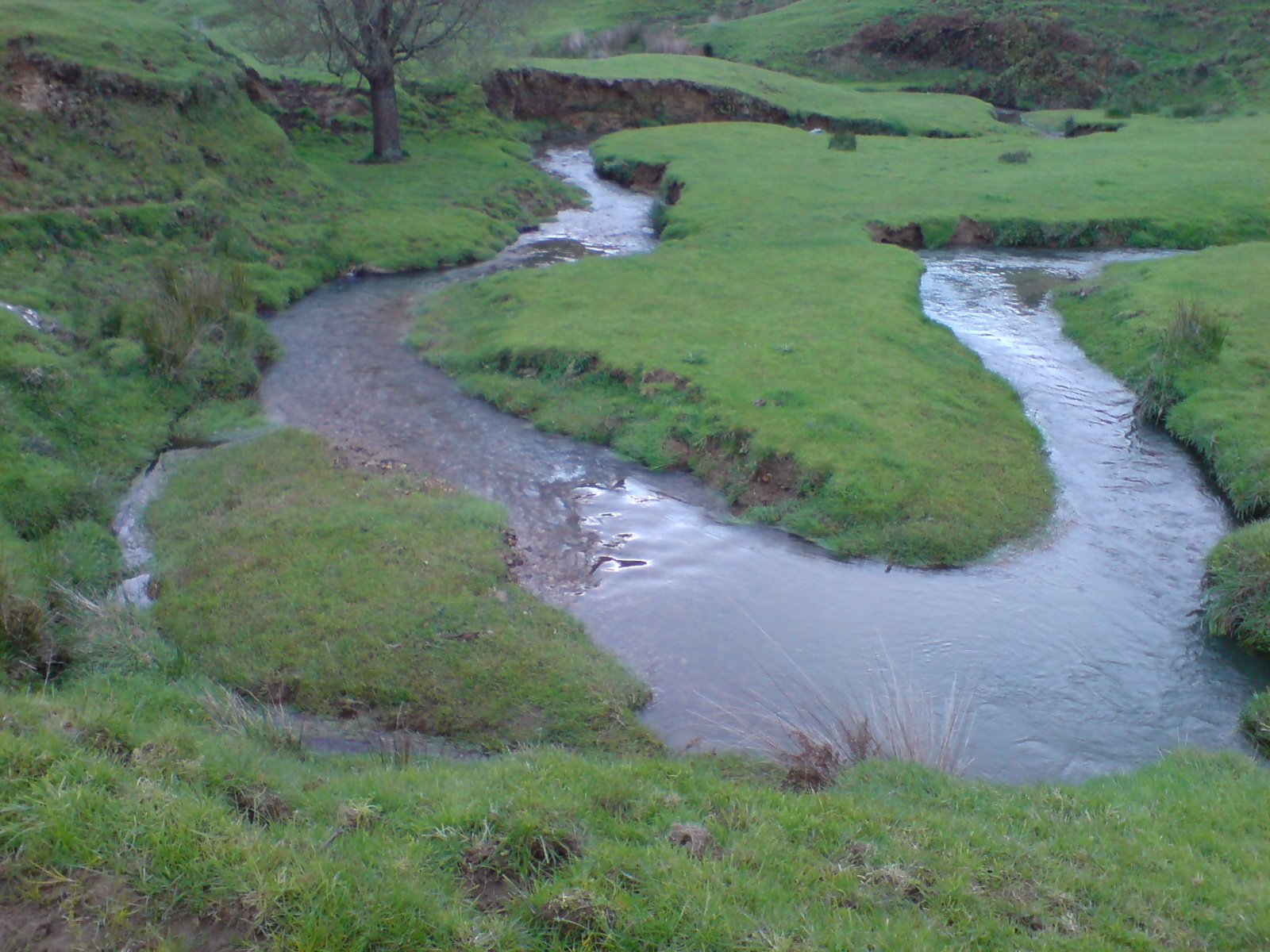
A tributary stream in the Waitomo District showing agriculture-induced erosion

The large catchment area of the Waikato River is highly fertile farmland, so intensive agriculture is present. Due to the agricultural activity within the catchment, significant agricultural pollution is leached into groundwater and contained in the runoff. The mismanagement of nitrogen fertilizer and effluent spreading practices in dairy farming is seen as the major causes of this pollution. Since 2000, Environment Waikato has joined with conservation-minded farmers to bring about more efficient and scientific use of fertilizers.

The removal of the native vegetation throughout the catchment to accommodate the increasing demand for farmland has contributed to the silting up of the river with loose soils from eroded farmland. However, most of the silting is due to the construction of the many hydrodams. In its pre-1930s wild state, the silt was flushed from the river every winter by flood surges. The remnants of these can be seen in the silt channels carved out of what is now St Andrews golf course, adjacent to the river in Hamilton.

Arsenic enters the river at concentrations that reach 0.035 grams of arsenic per cubic metre in places, exceeding the WHO provisional guideline of 0.01 grams of arsenic per cubic metre and making the water unsuitable for drinking water unless treated. The majority of arsenic in the Waikato River comes from the Wairakei Geothermal Power Station. The amount of arsenic gradually declines as the river flows northwards and is at its lowest at the Waikato River Heads.

Since 2002, around 75 million litres (20,000,000 US gal) of water a day has been drawn from the river at Tuakau, treated and pumped along a 38-kilometre (24 mi) pipe north to Auckland, where it is mixed with local water. This met 8% of Auckland's water needs in 2010/11. In December 2012 capacity was increased to 125 million litres (33,000,000 US gal), and in 2013 work started to increase it to 150 million litres (40,000,000 US gal). The treatment plant meets New Zealand's 2000 drinking water standards according to Water Care NZ. This is equal to or better than the A standard for Auckland's other water supplies.

Slightly modified human waste is pumped into the river downriver of several towns. Hamilton city has one of the most modern water treatment systems in the world following a 2003 report by GHB water consultants. In 2007, $22 million was spent upgrading the existing intake station south of the city at Riverlea. This will meet the city's demand until 2016. Wastewater in its untreated state is 99.9% water and 0.1% other matter. A series of sophisticated machines produces clean water of a high standard, getting rid of bad tastes, odours and toxins to meet the upgraded NZ water standards. The Pukete 2 project, which started in 2002, will upgrade the plant in a series of stages costing $24 million.

A further issue is industrial and metropolitan waste from early-established landfills and waste-emitting factories on the banks of the river. These include an unlined waste dump at Horotiu, just downriver from Hamilton, whose leachate includes persistent organic pollutants such as dieldrin in quantities toxic to freshwater and marine life. The 2002 GHD report saw new regulations put in place to make industries comply with a new bylaw that stops hazardous substances from entering the water system at all, according to the HCC website.

== See also ==
- List of rivers of New Zealand
- List of rivers of New Zealand by length
