= Mangatangi River =

Coordinates: 37.224363°S 175.174833°E

- Location within New Zealand

Location
- Country: New Zealand

Physical characteristics
- Source
  - location: Hunua Ranges
  - elevation: 688 m (2,257 ft)
- Mouth
  - location: Maramarua River
  - elevation: 15 m (49 ft)
- Length: approx. 35 km (22 mi)
- Basin size: 196 km^{2} (76 sq mi)
- Discharge
  - location: SH 2 bridge
  - minimum: 0.127 cubic metres per second (28 imperial gallons per second)
  - maximum: 183 m^{3}/s (40,254 impgal/s)

The Mangatangi River, or Mangatangi Stream, originates on the eastern slopes of the Hunua Ranges in New Zealand and flows roughly southwards until it is joined by the Ruaotehuia Stream just north of State Highway 2 between Mangatāwhiri and Maramarua, where it becomes the Maramarua River. Mangatangi can be translated as manga tangi to stream of weeping, or as rippling stream, or babbling brook.

== River or stream? ==
The dictionary defines a river as a large natural stream. The Mangatangi is called a stream by some sources and a river by others. The New Zealand Geographic Board hasn't given it an official name.

The 1:50,000 map shows it as a Stream, but LAWA calls it a River, as does Regional Council in documents on swimming and flow, but a Stream in its catchment management plan. Other references to River are 1894 and 1895 requests for a bridge, a Ratification Information Booklet and on Te Awa, RNZ, District Council, National Library and local historical group websites.

== Geology ==
The river starts as several small streams on the eastern slopes of the Hunua Ranges. Greywacke and argillite of the Waipapa Group form the High Hunua Horst and underlie the river in the Hunua Ranges. The south-eastern boundary of the horst is the Mangatangi Fault, which runs along the north-west side of the mid section of the river. The upper stream is typically shallow, fast flowing, with cobble and gravel substrate.

== Human use ==
As well as being a water and recreation resource, the river was historically a transport link. It also provided shingle to metal local roads and that use continues. A flax industry also existed as late as 1930.

=== Mangatangi Dam ===
The earth-fill dam (2,140,000 m^{3} (76,000,000 cu ft), with stone facing, was built between 1972 and 1977, on a foundation drainage filled with greywacke, with a 67 m (220 ft) high bellmouth spillway. It is 340 m (1,120 ft) wide, 78 m (256 ft) high and can hold 39,000,000 m^{3} (8.6×10^{9} imp gal) of water covering 169 ha (420 acres).

=== Bridges ===
In 1897 Whangamarino Road Board built a girder bridge across the river. By 1914 it was in disrepair. A flood swept a temporary bridge away, whilst a replacement was being built in 1922.

Further upstream, Stubbs Bridge was also built in 1922, swept away in 1966 and replaced in 1967.

In 1921 Franklin County Council rejected a tender for a bridge with concrete piers, a main span of 64 ft (20 m) and two 20 ft (6.1 m) side spans. Stubbs Bridge was opened on 22 December 1924 by Minister of Public Works, Gordon Coates.

== Ecology ==
=== Species ===
Introduced species include rainbow and brown trout. Koi carp and mosquitofish, have become major pests.

Trout were introduced in 1885.

Water quality is high in the regional park, but degrades downstream with increasing agricultural land use, so that by the Watercare Services flow gauging weir, given consent in 2001, only eels and Crans bully (Gobiomorphus basalis) were recorded. Galaxiids are largely absent upstream of the weir. Longfinned and shortfinned eels, and Crans bully are common. Attempts were made in the past to trap eels, in the belief that they damaged fisheries.

Grey teal, brown teal and grey duck have been seen on the reservoir.

=== Environmental issues ===
Pollution measurements near the mouth of the river show that it is among the worst 25% of waterways in the country for a majority of pollutants. The catchment is mostly fertile farmland, so intensive agriculture is present and significant agricultural pollution is leached into groundwater and contained in the runoff.

The removal of the native vegetation throughout the catchment to accommodate the increasing demand for farmland has contributed to the silting of the river with loose soils from eroded farmland. That would have been exacerbated by floating the felled logs down the stream, which was licensed under the Timber Floating Act 1873 till at least 1911.
