= Maramarua River =

Coordinates: 37°18′S 175°04′E

Location
- Country: New Zealand

Physical characteristics
- Source
  - location: Waikato Region

The Maramarua River is in the north-eastern part of the Waikato District of New Zealand. It is formed by the confluence of the Mangatangi River and the Ruaotehuia Stream just north of State Highway 2 between Mangatāwhiri and Maramarua. It flows through the northern part of the Whangamarino Wetland and joins the Whangamarino River shortly before that river flows into the Waikato River.

== Geology ==
The river first formed during the Pliocene era, approximately 3 to 4 million years ago. Originally it was a westwards-flowing river, flowing towards the Tasman Sea past Pōkeno, where the modern Waikato River flows.

== See also ==
- List of rivers of New Zealand
