= Motutieke Island =

Coordinates: 37.310578°S 174.812357°E

Motutieke Island is the largest of the many low-lying marshy islands in the delta of the Waikato River, New Zealand's longest river. Stretching for some 7 kilometres (4 mi), and close to 1,000 metres (3,300 ft) wide at its widest, the island is in reality two islands separated by a shallow channel. The main body of the Waikato River flows to the southeast of the island, with narrow channels separating it to the north from the mainland of New Zealand's North Island. The smaller Puehunui Island lies close to the northwest.

A few small properties dot the northeastern shore of Motutieke, accessible primarily by boat.
