= Waipakihi River =

Coordinates: 39°13′S 175°48′E

Location
- Country: New Zealand

Physical characteristics
- Source
  - location: Kaimanawa Range
- Mouth
  - location: Waikato River
- Length: 21 km (13 mi)

The Waipakihi River is a river of the Waikato Region of New Zealand's North Island. It is the first major tributary of the infant Waikato, flowing southwest from the Kaimanawa Range to reach the Waikato 15 kilometres (9 mi) east of Mount Ngauruhoe on the North Island Volcanic Plateau.

== See also ==
- List of rivers of New Zealand
