= Maraetai Power Station =

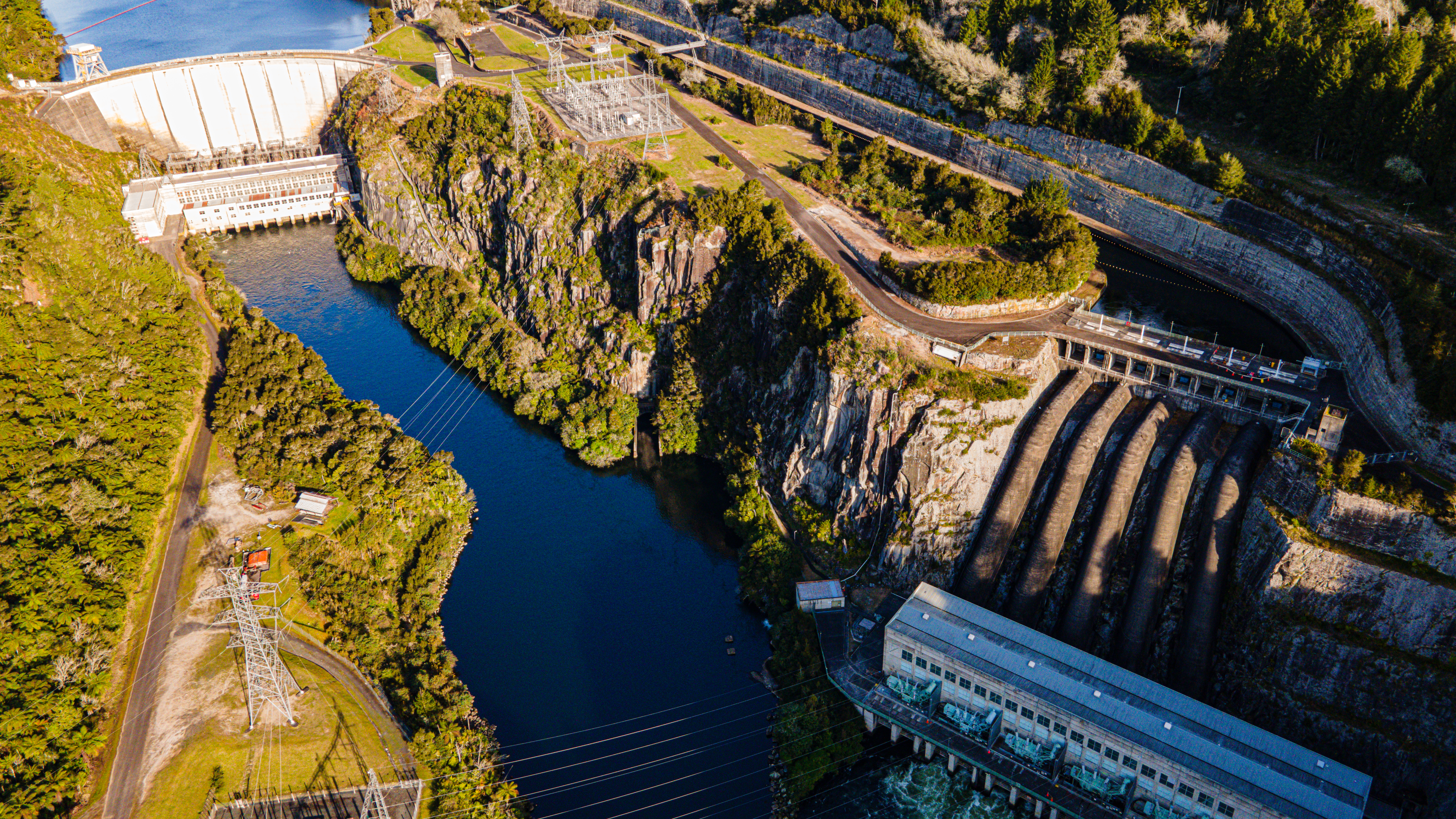
- Maraetai I (Left) and Maraetai II (Right)

- Location within New Zealand
- Country: New Zealand
- Location: near Mangakino, Waikato
- Coordinates: 38°21′9″S 175°44′38″E
- Status: Operational
- Construction began: 1946
- Opening date: September 1953
- Owner: Mercury Energy

Dam and spillways
- Type of dam: Arch dam
- Impounds: Waikato River
- Height: 87 m (285 ft)
- Length: 133 m (436 ft)
- Width (crest): 11 m (36 ft)
- Width (base): 15.2 m (50 ft)
- Spillways: 1

Reservoir
- Creates: Lake Maraetai
- Surface area: 4.1 km^{2} (1.6 sq mi)

Power Station
- Commission date: September 1953 (Maraetai I); February 1971 (Maraetai II)
- Type: Conventional
- Hydraulic head: 61 m (200 ft)
- Turbines: 10 × Francis
- Installed capacity: 360 MW
- Annual generation: 885 GWh

Maraetai Power Station is a hydroelectric power station on the Waikato River, in the North Island of New Zealand. It is the fifth of the eight hydroelectric power stations on the Waikato River, and at 360 MW, is the largest hydroelectric station on the Waikato.

The station has two powerhouses - Maraetai I powerhouse is directly in front of the Maraetai Dam, while Maraetai II powerhouse is located 550 metres (1,800 ft) downstream of Maraetai I. Although both are completely separate, both powerhouses are operated as one power station.

Maraetai is owned and operated by Mercury Energy.

== History ==
=== Maraetai I ===
In early 1946, the Minister of Public Works Bob Semple, announced a full development of the Waikato River, with the first three stations planned at Ohakuri, Whakamaru, and Maraetai. Although Ohakuri was chosen first, the choice soon shifted to Whakamaru as it would be the best location for transmission needs. However, more investigation had been done for the Maraetai site, and starting Whakamaru first would make it more complex to divert the river for Maraetai later, so it was decided to build Maraetai first.

Investigations into a hydroelectric station at Maraetai had been completed between 1940 and 1945. The site was in a deep narrow gorge, west of Tokoroa and 20 miles (32 km) upstream of Arapuni. Because of the narrowness of the gorge, the powerhouse took up the entire length of the base of the dam, meaning no orthodox spillway could be constructed. This meant that the spillway had to be designed as part of the diversion tunnel. The site was composed of volcanic ignimbrite, which had cracked extensively on cooling meaning extensive grouting of the rock was required.

Construction of Maraetai I began in 1946, with the construction of an access road from Tokoroa, and establishing services and accommodation for the workers of the dam. The service and accommodation camp formed the town of Mangakino, on the south shore of what would become Lake Maraetai. Problems were encountered right from the beginning - the Second World War had just ended, which meant there was a great deal of shortages of labour and materials. The Public Works department's work-force was less than two-thirds of its pre-war size, with thousands of vacancies not filled. Concrete and steel were also in short supply, as steel imports were less than half their pre-war levels, and local contractors could only produce two-thirds of the required amount of concrete. Combined with industrial unrest and the nature of the site, the target completion date of 1951 became less achievable.

Work on the diversion tunnel - 25 feet (7.6 m) in diameter and 1,685 feet (514 m) in length - began in late 1946 on the southern side of the site. However, work was slowed by large amounts of water that poured into the tunnel until it was extensively grouted with cement and bitumen and lined with concrete. Because of the constant water seepage, it was not uncommon for the workers to work in knee-high or even waist-high water. By 1948, some 800 workers were working on the site. The tunnel was completed in March 1949, when the northern portal was opened and the first water flowed through the tunnel. Work then started by building cofferdams to block the natural channel of the river and allow dam construction to begin. The Taupō control gates were shut to lower the water level in the Waikato, and 11 bulldozers frantically pushed spoil into the river to stop the natural flow. The process was hampered by unexpected heavy rain which caused the river to rapidly rise, with it taking 27 hours to finally dam the river's natural course. The spillway tunnel was then constructed, which dropped at a 45-degree angle to intersect with the diversion tunnel.

In late 1949, work finally started on the dam foundations. Extensive and careful grouting of the rock took place, reaching 200 feet (61 m) below the river bed, and along the sides for a length of 1,000 feet (300 m). The grouting involved drilling thousands of holes in the rock face, and 11,000 tonnes (11,000 long tons; 12,000 short tons) of cement was used in the process.

Construction of the dam began in September 1950, and soon the work force had reached its peak of 1200. A large mechanised batching plant had been bought on site to produce in excess of 153,000 cubic metres (200,000 yd^{3}) of concrete that was required for the dam, which was reinforced with 5,000 tonnes (4,900 long tons; 5,500 short tons) of steel. For the first time in New Zealand, a system of cooling mass concrete was used. This involved embedded pipes through which refrigerated water was passed.

The powerhouse was constructed rapidly to have the machines operating as soon as possible. The foundations were started in early 1950, and the powerhouse was completed within a year. It consisted of a steel structural frame with a pre-cast concrete sectional roof. The transformer station was placed at the back and on top of the powerhouse itself due to the confines of the gorge.

The Public Works Department wanted to source major equipment from outside the usual United Kingdom because of tight delivery dates, and British firms' lack of experience in constructing large turbines, generators and 220 kV equipment. Eventually, contracts were let to Canada for the generators and the United States for the turbines, both being more experienced and the price being 40% less than the British equivalent. For the spillway gates and frames, a tender from West Germany only five years after the Second World War was quite surprisingly accepted by Cabinet, being one-third lower and one year faster than the lowest British offer.

By mid-1951, the penstocks had been installed and the first three machines had been installed. On 31 October 1952, Maraetai generated its first electricity, producing 30 megawatts (40,000 hp)on a reduced load and half head. Temporary flumes transported water through the powerhouse from the two remaining penstocks. The reduced head was maintained while the diversion tunnel was stopped with a huge 30-metre (98 ft) long concrete plug. The head was raised to 175 feet (53 m) in April 1953, and the station was officially opened on 5 September 1953 - two years after the target completion date.

The fourth machine was installed in January 1954, followed by the fifth and final machine in April. The lake was then raised to its full height of 200 feet (61 m) head.

=== Maraetai II ===
The construction of the Maraetai II powerhouse, the last powerhouse to be built on the Waikato River began in 1959, with a 500-metre long canal taking water down the south side of the gorge to the powerhouse. In 1961, work on Maraetai II was suspended when the newly elected National government, led by Sir Keith Holyoake, shifted priority to building the HVDC Inter-Island ("Cook Strait cable") between the North and South Islands, following a significant increase in electricity demand.

With the inter-island link completed in 1965, work recommenced on Maraetai II, with the first two turbines and generators were finally commissioned in July 1970. The last turbine and generator, and the last on the Waikato River, being commissioned in February 1971 - almost 25 years after construction of Maraetai began.

== Dam ==
Maraetai's dam is a concrete arch dam which impounds the Waikato River behind the Maraetai I powerhouse, and creates Lake Maraetai. The dam is 133 metres (436 ft) long, 87 metres (285 ft) high, and is 15.2 metres (50 ft) wide at the base and 11 metres (36 ft) at the crest. At one time, the dam was the largest hydroelectric dam in the Southern Hemisphere.

The dam's spillway is located south of the dam. Because of the dam's location in a narrow gorge, there was insufficient space to construct an orthodox spillway, so the diversion tunnel used in construction was reconfigured to become the dam's spillway. The spillway tunnel is 521 metres (1,709 ft) long, and 7.6 metres (25 ft) in diameter, and is blocked by three spillway gates, each 7.1 metres (23 ft) high and 7.16 metres (23.5 ft) wide.

== Generation ==
=== Maraetai I ===
Water for Maraetai I is taken from Lake Maraetai at the dam, and is conveyed to the powerhouse by five steel penstocks, each 70 metres (230 ft) long and 4.8 metres (16 ft) in diameter. The water is used to turn five Vertical Francis turbine, each revolving at 167 rpm. Water is then deposited back into the Waikato River.

Each of the five turbines turns a generator, each generating 36 MW of electricity at 11,000 volts. For one megawatt of electricity to be generated, 2,000 litres (440 imp gal; 530 US gal) of water must pass through the turbines every second. Electricity from each generator is then conveyed to a 40 MVA transformer, where the electricity is stepped-up to 220 kV for transmission.

A sixth penstock is fitted to Maraetai I, which takes water to two auxiliary turbines and generators. These generators are used to generate electricity for the requirements in both Maraetai I and Maraetai II.

=== Maraetai II ===
Water for Maraetai II is diverted down a canal south of the dam to the powerhouse. The canal to Maraetai II is 550 metres (1,800 ft) long, 12 metres (39 ft) wide, and 12 metres (39 ft) deep.

Water is taken from the canal to the powerhouse via five steel penstocks, slightly different from Maraetai I's. The penstocks are 102 metres (335 ft) long and 4.6 metres (15 ft) in diameter. The water is used to turn five Vertical Francis turbines, revolving at a higher speed of 187 rpm.

The generators at Maraetai II produce 36 MW each at 11,000 volts. This is stepped-up by 40 MVA transformers to 220 kV for transmission.

== Transmission ==
Electricity from both stations is sent to the Maraetai switchyard, between the two powerhouses. Electricity from the downstream Waipapa Power Station links into Maraetai via a single-circuit 220 kV line (MRI-WPA-A), and electricity from Maraetai and Waipapa is then transmitted to Whakamaru via two single-circuit 220 kV lines (MRI-WKM-A and MRI-WKM-B).

From Whakamaru, electricity generated at Maraetai is distributed via Transpower's 220 kV grid to Hamilton, Taupō, Palmerston North, and Auckland.
