= Whangamarino River =

Coordinates: 37°18′S 175°05′E

Location
- Country: New Zealand

Physical characteristics
- Source
  - location: Lake Waikare (modified due to flood control scheme)
- Mouth
  - location: Waikato River @ Meremere

The Whangamarino River is a lowland river of the Waikato Region of New Zealand's North Island, draining the Whangamarino Wetland and associated farmland catchment. The river converges with the Waikato River just north of Meremere. The main tributary is the Maramarua River, which starts in the Hunua Ranges and forms the northern catchment of the Whangamarino River.

The natural Whangamarino River system, especially the main branch (the southern catchment), has been highly modified due to the lower flood protection scheme of the lower Waikato River. Prior to these floodworks, the Whangamarino Catchment was unconnected with Lake Waikare. However, due to the Lower Waikato-Waipa Flood Control Scheme, constructed in the 1960s, Lake Waikare was transformed and used for flood retention storage when the nearby Waikato River was in flood. During flood events, the Waikato River now overflows into the transformed Lake Waikato via the Rangiriri Spillway (and the redirected Te Onetea Stream). When the Waikato River conditions are suitable, the flood waters are discharged from Lake Waikare into the Whangamarino River catchment through the artificial Pungarehu Canal.

While the flood scheme has permanently changed the ecology of Lake Waikare, it has also provided broader benefits for the community.

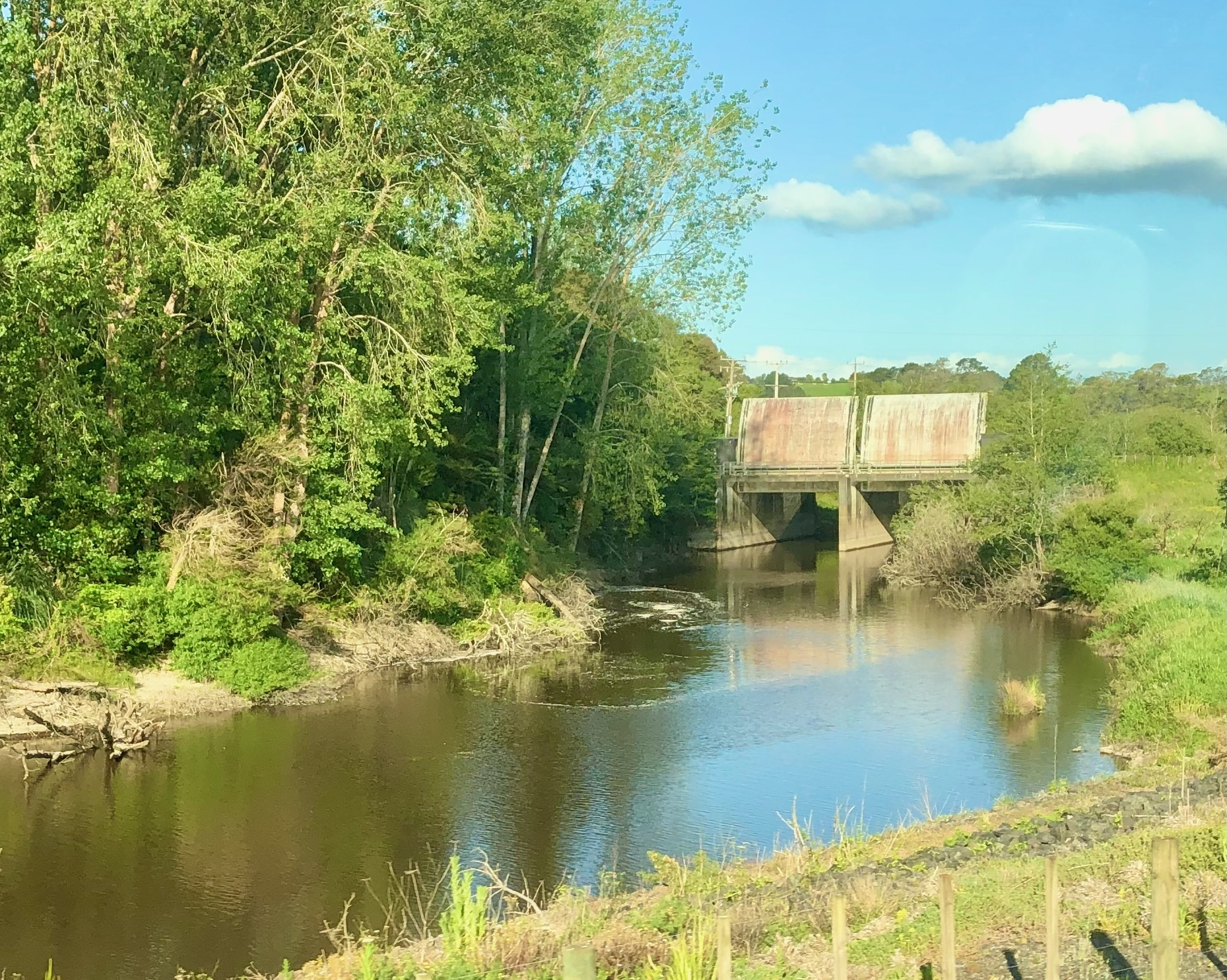
Whangamarino River stop gates from the railway

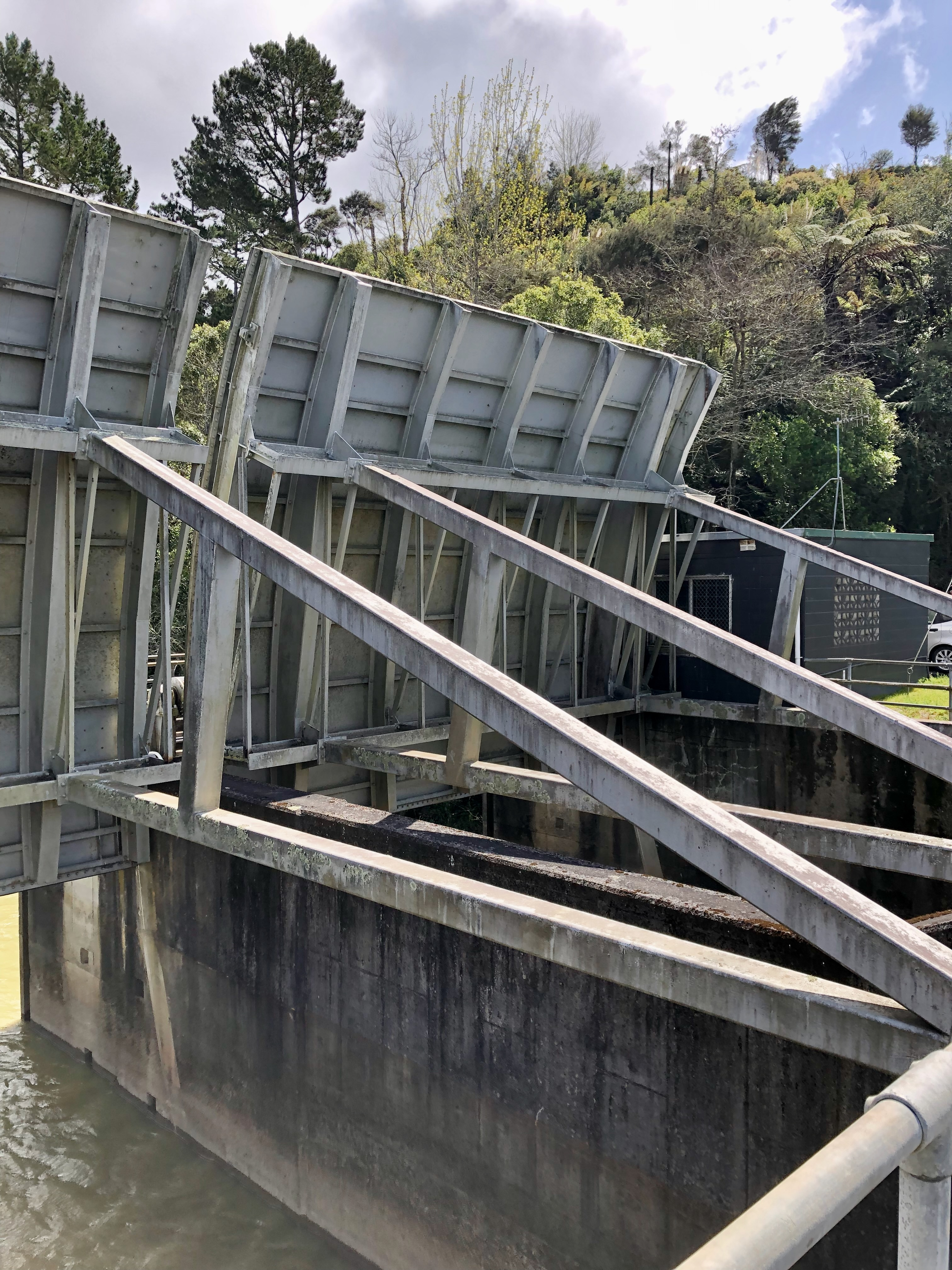
Whangamarino stop gates

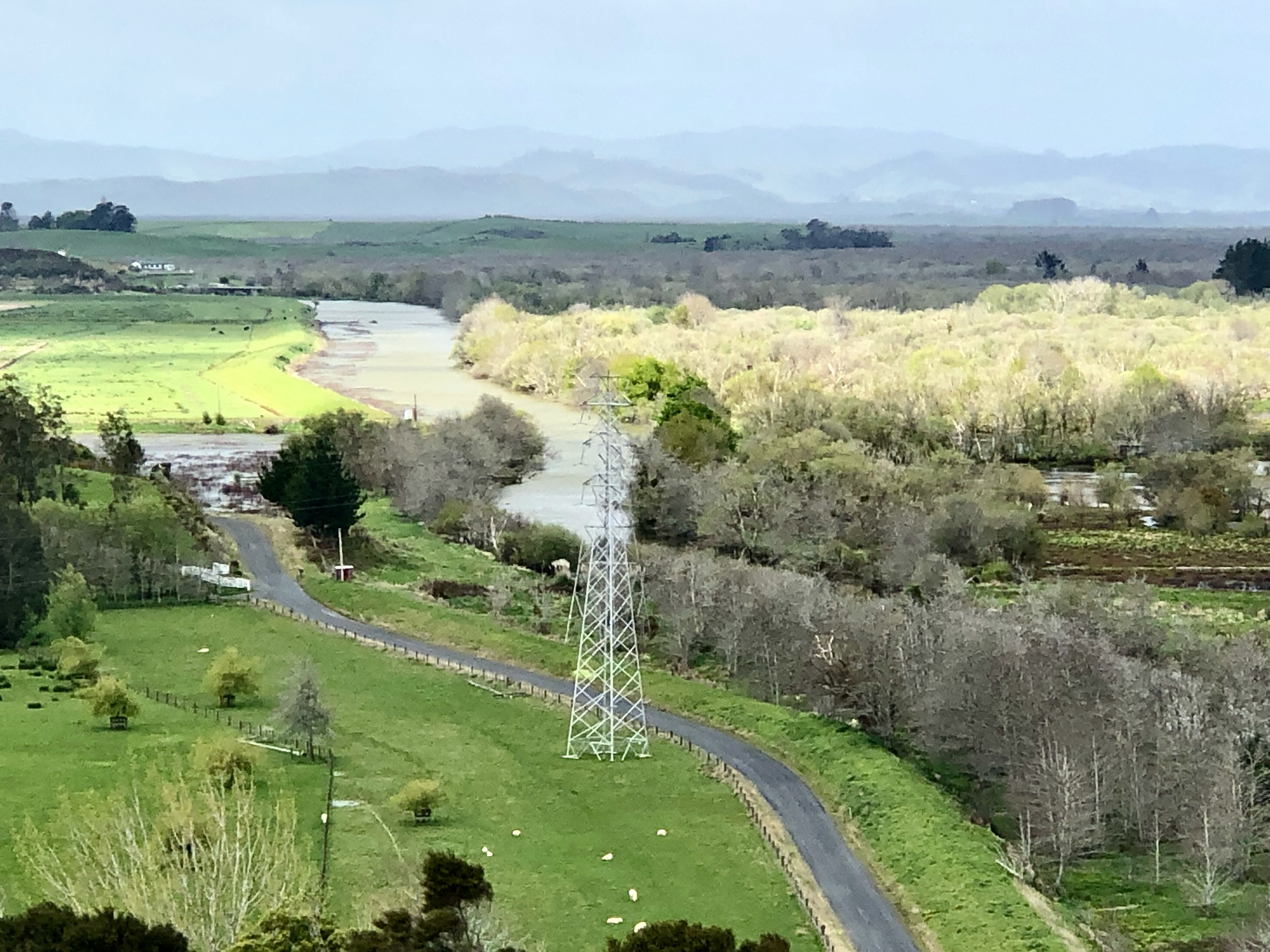
Confluence of Waikato and Whangamarino Rivers

== Whangamarino Wetland ==
The Whangamarino River includes the large Whangamarino Wetland (5,193 hectares) which is the second largest bog and swamp wetland in the North Island of New Zealand (after the Kopuatai Peat Dome). Due to human activity of draining the wetland for farming and the impact of the flood control scheme, the size of the wetland is about half its natural size. The wetland includes peat bog, swampland, mesotrophic lags, and open water river systems are managed as both Wetland and Wildlife Management reserves by the Department of Conservation. Importantly, the Wetland is protected by under the Ramsar Convention (Wetland Protection Treaty).

== Bridges ==
The main crossings of the river are -

- SH2 on a 61.6 m (202 ft) bridge
- NIMT railway on a 150 m (490 ft) bridge
- SH1 on 39.7 m (130 ft) bridges built in 1981

== See also ==
- List of rivers of New Zealand
