= Enginator =

Engine type

An enginator is an internal combustion engine whose fuel supply comes directly from underground deposits or waste gas produced from a landfill. Its fuel supply will last as long as the natural deposit.

Enginators are currently built by the Waukesha Engines company and have been featured on the Modern Marvels Episode "Horsepower".
