= Mangatāwhiri =

- Locality
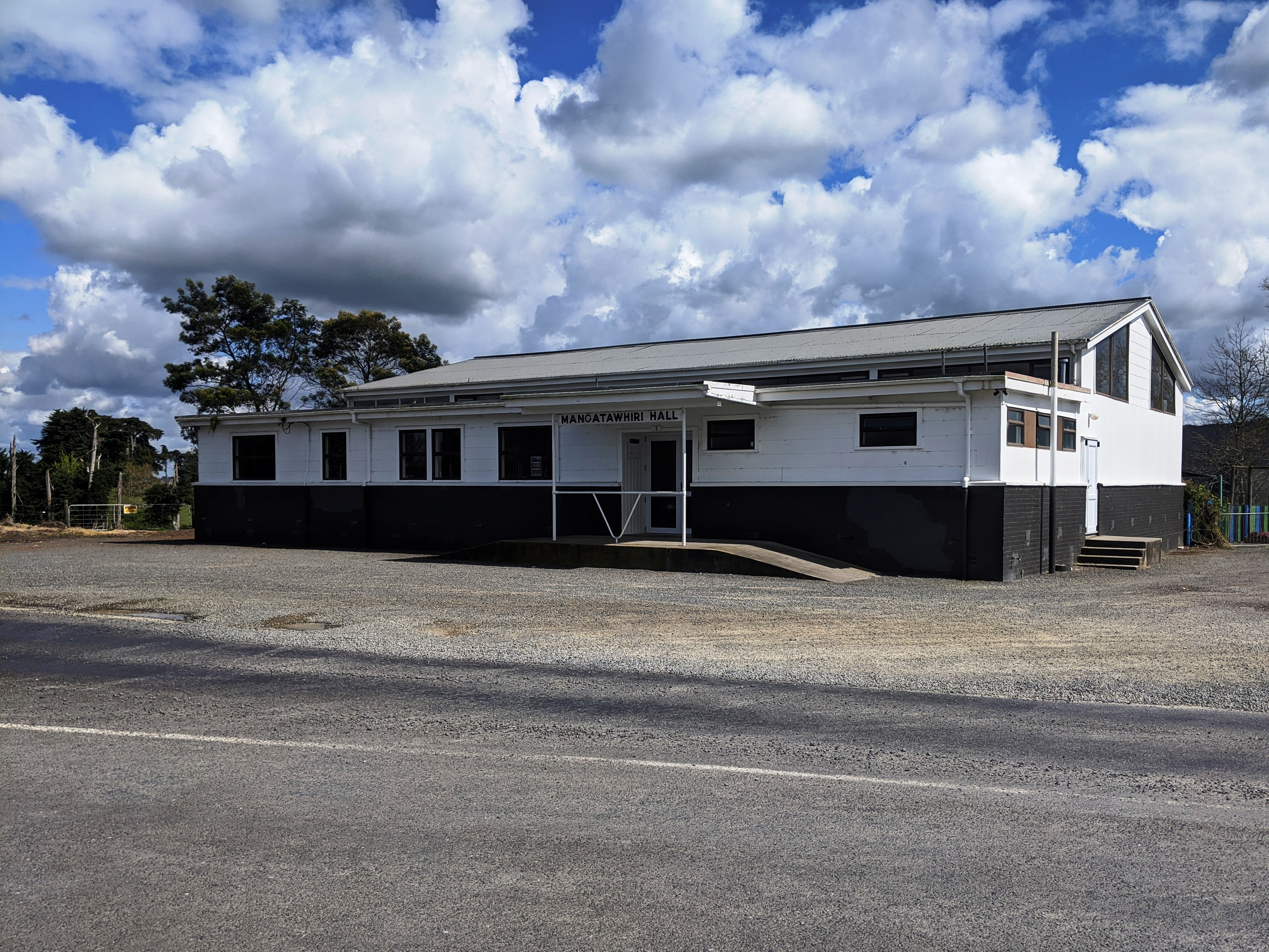
- Mangatāwhiri Hall
- Interactive map of Mangatāwhiri
- Coordinates: 37.215°S 175.123°E
- Country: New Zealand
- Region: Waikato
- District: Waikato District
- Wards: Awaroa-Maramarua General Ward; Tai Raro Takiwaa Maaori Ward
- Electorates: Coromandel; Hauraki-Waikato (Māori)

Government
  - Territorial Authority: Waikato District Council
  - Regional council: Waikato Regional Council
  - Mayor of Waikato: Aksel Bech
  - Port Waikato MP: Andrew Bayly
  - Hauraki-Waikato MP: Hana-Rawhiti Maipi-Clarke

Area
  - Total: 20.80 km^{2} (8.03 sq mi)
- Elevation: 20 m (66 ft)

Population (2023 census)
  - Total: 360
  - Density: 17/km^{2} (45/sq mi)
- Time zone: UTC+12 (NZST)
  - Summer (DST): UTC+13 (NZDT)

Mangatāwhiri is a locality about 10 km north-east of Pōkeno and 7 km west of Mangatangi in the Waikato District in the North Island of New Zealand.

The New Zealand Ministry for Culture and Heritage gives a translation of "tāwhiri tree stream" for Mangatāwhiri.

The Castle is a prominent building on Mangatawhiri Road which once housed the Castle Cafe.

Mangatāwhiri River flows south from the Hunua Ranges through Mangatāwhiri, and joins the Waikato River near Mercer.

== History ==
During the 19th Century New Zealand Wars, Mangatāwhiri (specifically the Mangatāwhiri River) was set down by the second Māori King as an 'aukati', or demarcation line, indicating the boundary between the lands controlled by the Government (to the north of the river) and those controlled by the then nascent King Movement. Responding to the movement of British colonial troops southward from Auckland, King Tāwhiao stated that should these same troops cross the Mangatāwhiri River, then war would then ensue. On the 12th of July 1863, the British forces led by General Cameron duly crossed the river and thus commenced the invasion of the Waikato. This led to some of the most significant conflicts of the 19th century colonisation of New Zealand.

In the late 19th century, Mangatāwhiri was a major location for the kauri gum digging trade.

== Demographics ==
Mangatāwhiri locality is in two SA1 statistical areas which cover 20.80 km^{2} (8.03 sq mi) The SA1 areas are part of the larger Mangatangi statistical area.

Historical population
Year	Pop.	±% p.a.
2013	237	—
2018	327	+6.65%
2023	360	+1.94%

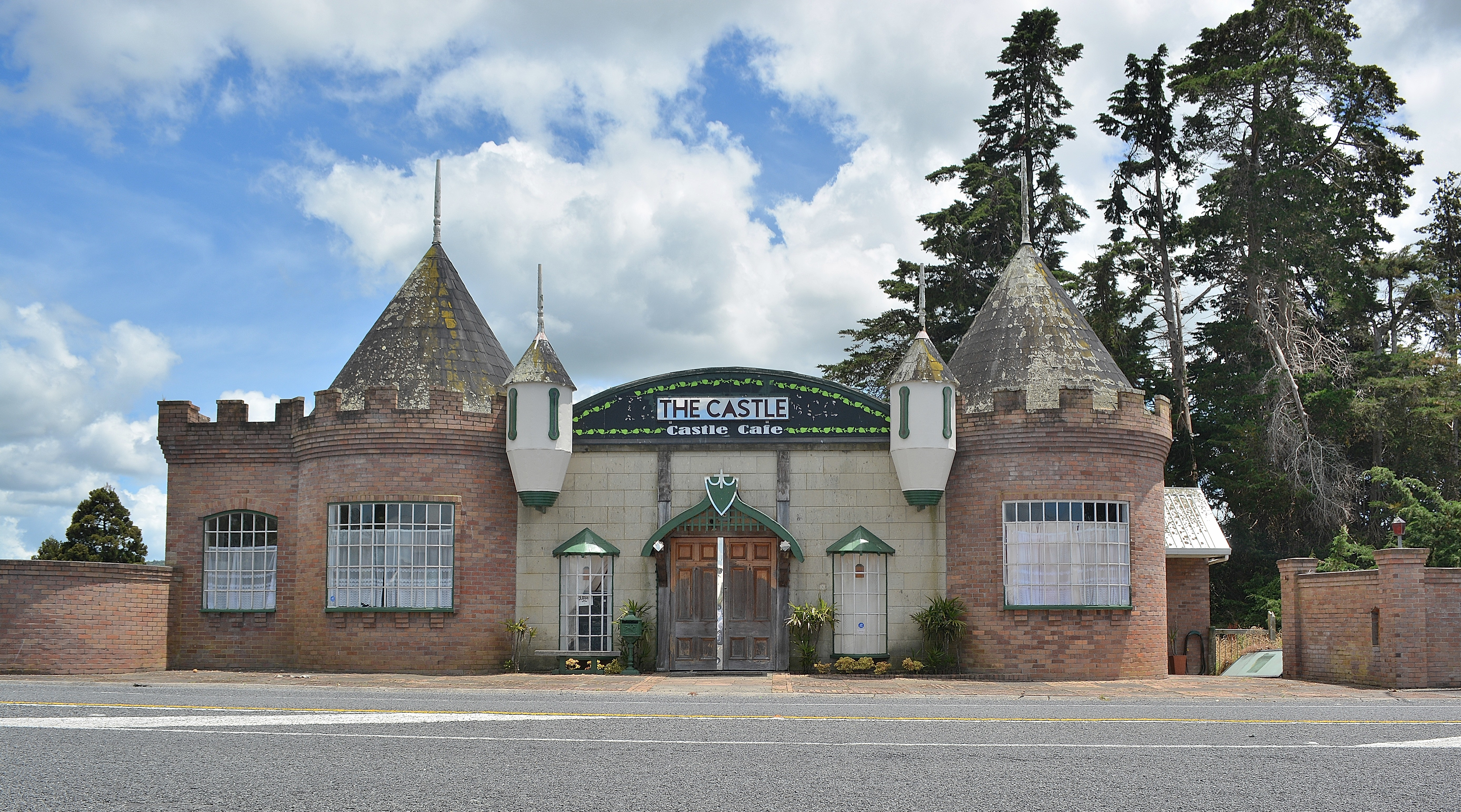
The Castle

The SA2 areas had a population of 360 in the 2023 New Zealand census, an increase of 33 people (10.1%) since the 2018 census, and an increase of 123 people (51.9%) since the 2013 census. There were 183 males and 171 females in 117 dwellings. 2.5% of people identified as LGBTIQ+. There were 93 people (25.8%) aged under 15 years, 48 (13.3%) aged 15 to 29, 171 (47.5%) aged 30 to 64, and 48 (13.3%) aged 65 or older.

People could identify as more than one ethnicity. The results were 85.8% European (Pākehā); 20.0% Māori; 7.5% Pasifika; 2.5% Asian; 0.8% Middle Eastern, Latin American and African New Zealanders (MELAA); and 1.7% other, which includes people giving their ethnicity as "New Zealander". English was spoken by 95.8%, Māori language by 3.3%, Samoan by 1.7%, and other languages by 2.5%. No language could be spoken by 1.7% (e.g. too young to talk). The percentage of people born overseas was 11.7, compared with 28.8% nationally.

Religious affiliations were 20.8% Christian, and 0.8% Hindu. People who answered that they had no religion were 71.7%, and 5.8% of people did not answer the census question.

Of those at least 15 years old, 45 (16.9%) people had a bachelor's or higher degree, 156 (58.4%) had a post-high school certificate or diploma, and 69 (25.8%) people exclusively held high school qualifications. 30 people (11.2%) earned over $100,000 compared to 12.1% nationally. The employment status of those at least 15 was that 156 (58.4%) people were employed full-time, 42 (15.7%) were part-time, and 3 (1.1%) were unemployed.

== Government ==
The Maungatawhiri Road District Board was established 2 October 1869 and administered the area until 1917 when it was amalgamated with Franklin County.

== Education ==
Mangatawhiri School is a co-educational state full primary school covering years 1 to 8, with a roll of 161 as of July 2026. The school started in the Lyons Homestead in the 19th century, and was moved to McKenzie Road in 1925. In 1962 a new school was built on the same site, and it has since been expanded to seven classrooms.
