= Lake Maraetai =

Hydro lake on New Zealand's Waikato River

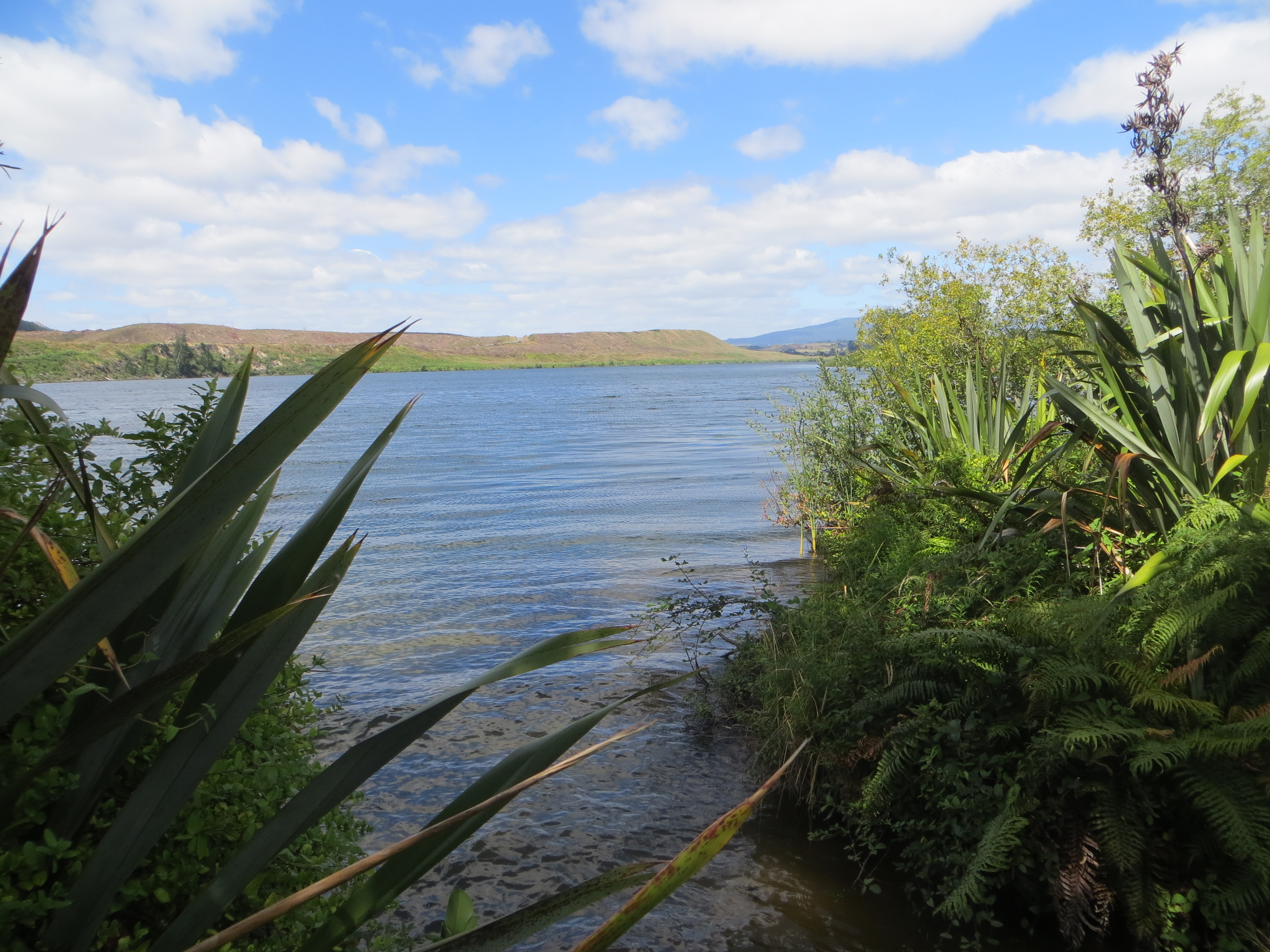
- Lake Maraetai from Mangakino

- Location within North Island
- Location: North Island
- Coordinates: 38.3664°S 175.7858°E
- Lake type: Reservoir
- Basin countries: New Zealand
- Surface area: 4.4 km^{2} (1.7 sq mi)
- Max. depth: 75 m (246 ft)

Lake Maraetai is one of several artificial lakes formed as part of a hydroelectricity scheme on the Waikato River in the North Island of New Zealand. It is located 85 kilometres (53 mi) southeast of Hamilton, close to the town of Mangakino.

It is a relatively small lake, covering only 4.4 square kilometres (1.7 sq mi), but it is 75 metres (246 ft) deep at some points, and the powerhouses (Maraetai I and Maraetai II) at its northern end generate 360 megawatts (480,000 hp) of power.

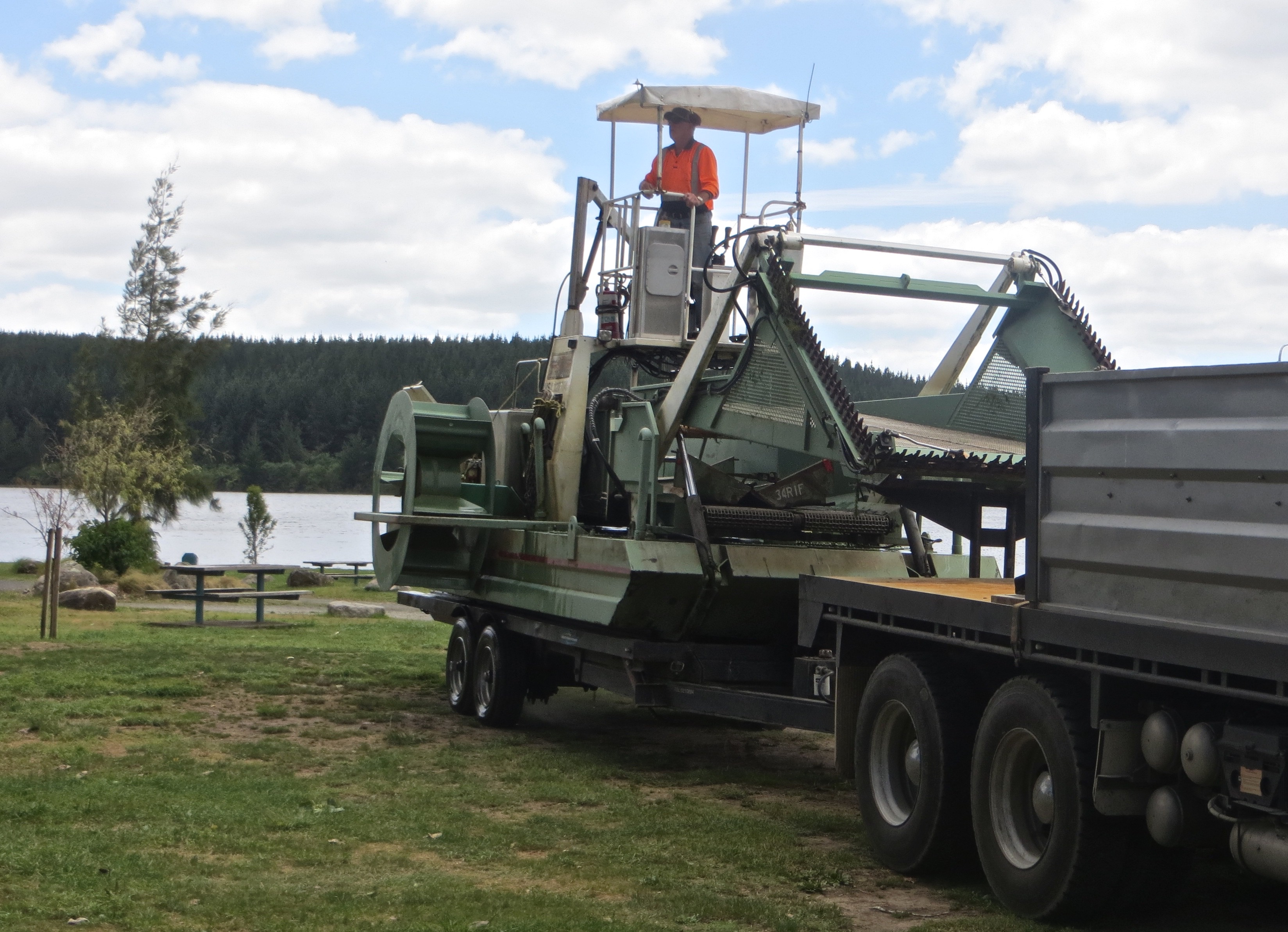
Mercury Energy weed cutter about to be launched to remove hornweed, which has been a problem since the 1960s
