= Waipapa River (Bay of Plenty) =

- Route of the Waipapa River
- Mouth of the Waipapa River Waipapa River (Bay of Plenty) (North Island)

Location
- Country: New Zealand

Physical characteristics
- Source: Kaimai Range
  - coordinates: 37°45′46″S 175°56′06″E
- Mouth
  - location: Waipapa Estuary
  - coordinates: 37°38′45″S 176°00′49″E
- Length: 21 km (13 mi)

Basin features
- Progression: Waipapa River → Waipapa Estuary → Tauranga Harbour → Bay of Plenty → Pacific Ocean
- Bridges: Waipapa Suspension Bridge

The Waipapa River is a river of the western Bay of Plenty Region of New Zealand's North Island. It flows generally north from its origins in Kaimai Mamaku Forest Park to reach Tauranga Harbour 12 kilometres (7 mi) west of Tauranga.

== See also ==
- List of rivers of New Zealand
