= Effluent spreading =

Effluent spreading is a process in which a slurry of effluent from a dairy farm's milking parlor is pumped and spread on pasture. Commonly a rotating sprinkler is used. Dairy manure contains ammonium NH4-N.

In New Zealand the application of effluent is a permitted activity, although spreading in excess is an environmental hazard.
