= Waipapa Power Station =

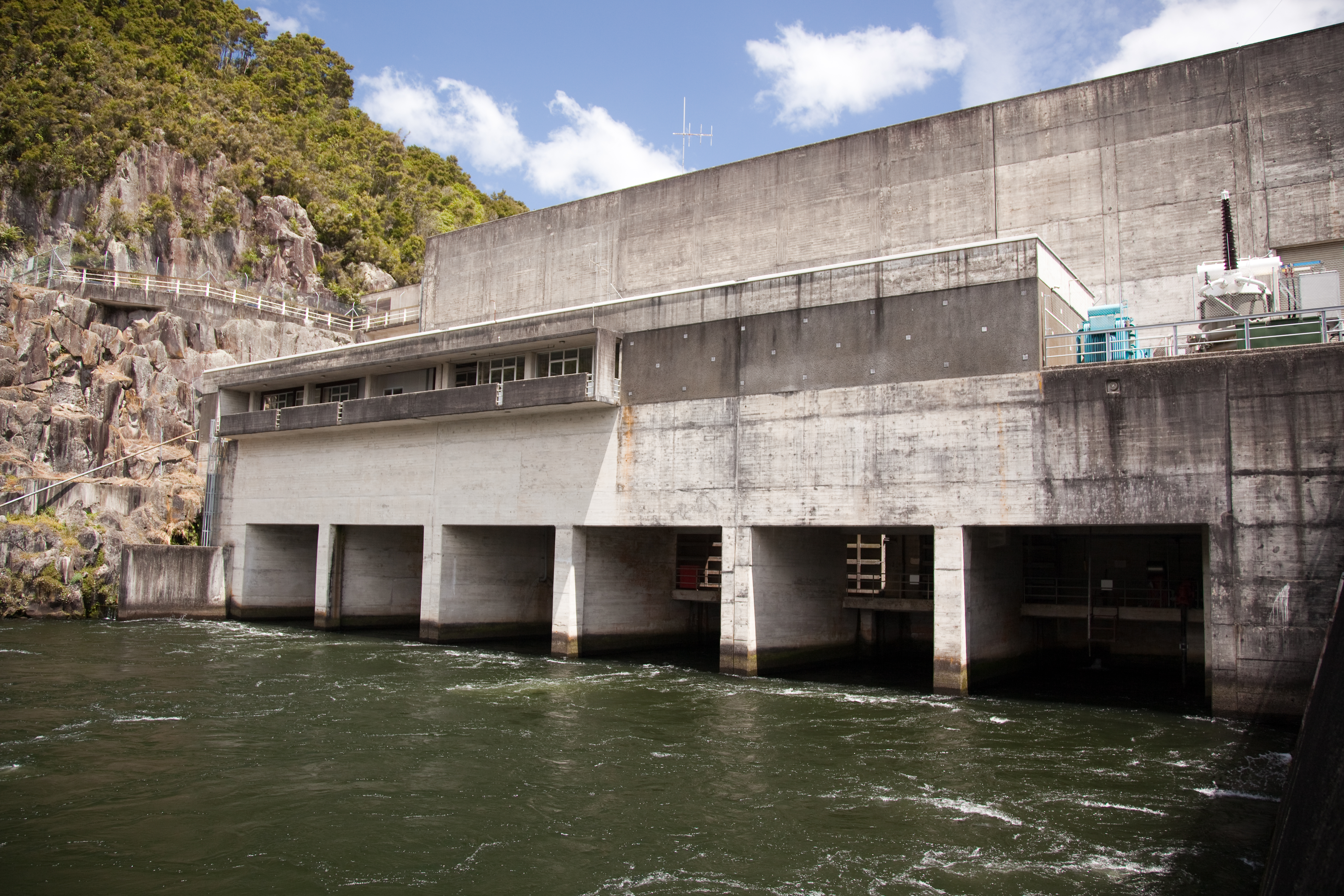
- Waipapa Power Station in 2009

- Location within New Zealand
- Country: New Zealand
- Location: Waikato River
- Coordinates: 38°17′31″S 175°41′1″E
- Purpose: Power
- Status: Operational
- Opening date: 1961

Dam and spillways
- Impounds: Waikato River

Waipapa Power Station
- Operator: Mercury Energy
- Commission date: 1961
- Turbines: 3 Kaplan turbines
- Installed capacity: 54 MW
- Annual generation: 330 GWh

Waipapa Power Station is a hydroelectric power station on the Waikato River, in the North Island of New Zealand. It is the sixth hydroelectric power station on the Waikato River. It is the smallest power station on the Waikato River.

Waipapa is operated by the publicly listed company Mercury Energy, an electricity generation and retail company.

== History ==
Although this site was initially considered in 1943, the decision to proceed with hydro development was not made until 1953. Construction began in 1955 and the first electricity was generated in April 1961. In 2001, the turbines were refurbished to improve operational efficiency.
