= Waikeria =

Settlement in Waikato, New Zealand

- Village
- Interactive map of Waikeria
- Coordinates: 38.120607°S 175.391019°E
- Country: New Zealand
- Region: Waikato Region
- District: Ōtorohanga District
- Ward: Wharepuhunga General Ward
- Electorates: Taranaki-King Country; Te Tai Hauāuru (Māori)

Government
  - Territorial Authority: Ōtorohanga District Council
  - Regional council: Waikato Regional Council
  - Mayor of Ōtorohanga: Rodney Dow
  - Taranaki-King Country MP: Barbara Kuriger
  - Te Tai Hauāuru MP: Debbie Ngarewa-Packer

Area
  - Territorial: 55.78 km^{2} (21.54 sq mi)

Population (2023 Census)
  - Territorial: 588
  - Density: 10.5/km^{2} (27.3/sq mi)
- Time zone: UTC+12 (NZST)
  - Summer (DST): UTC+13 (NZDT)

Waikeria is a rural community in the Ōtorohanga District and Waikato region of New Zealand's North Island.

Waikeria Prison, one of New Zealand's largest prisons, is located on a 1,200-hectare (3,000-acre) site on Waikeria Road.

The New Zealand Ministry for Culture and Heritage gives a translation of "dug-out water" for Waikeria.

== Marae ==
The local Whakamārama Marae is a meeting place of the Ngāti Raukawa hapū of Ngāti Puehutore. It includes Te Rangimoeakau meeting house.

== Demographics ==
Waikeria locality, including the prison, covers 55.78 km^{2} (21.54 sq mi). Waikeria is part of the larger Puniu statistical area.

Historical population of Waikeria
Year	Pop.	±% p.a.
2006	708	—
2013	474	−5.57%
2018	534	+2.41%
2023	588	+1.95%

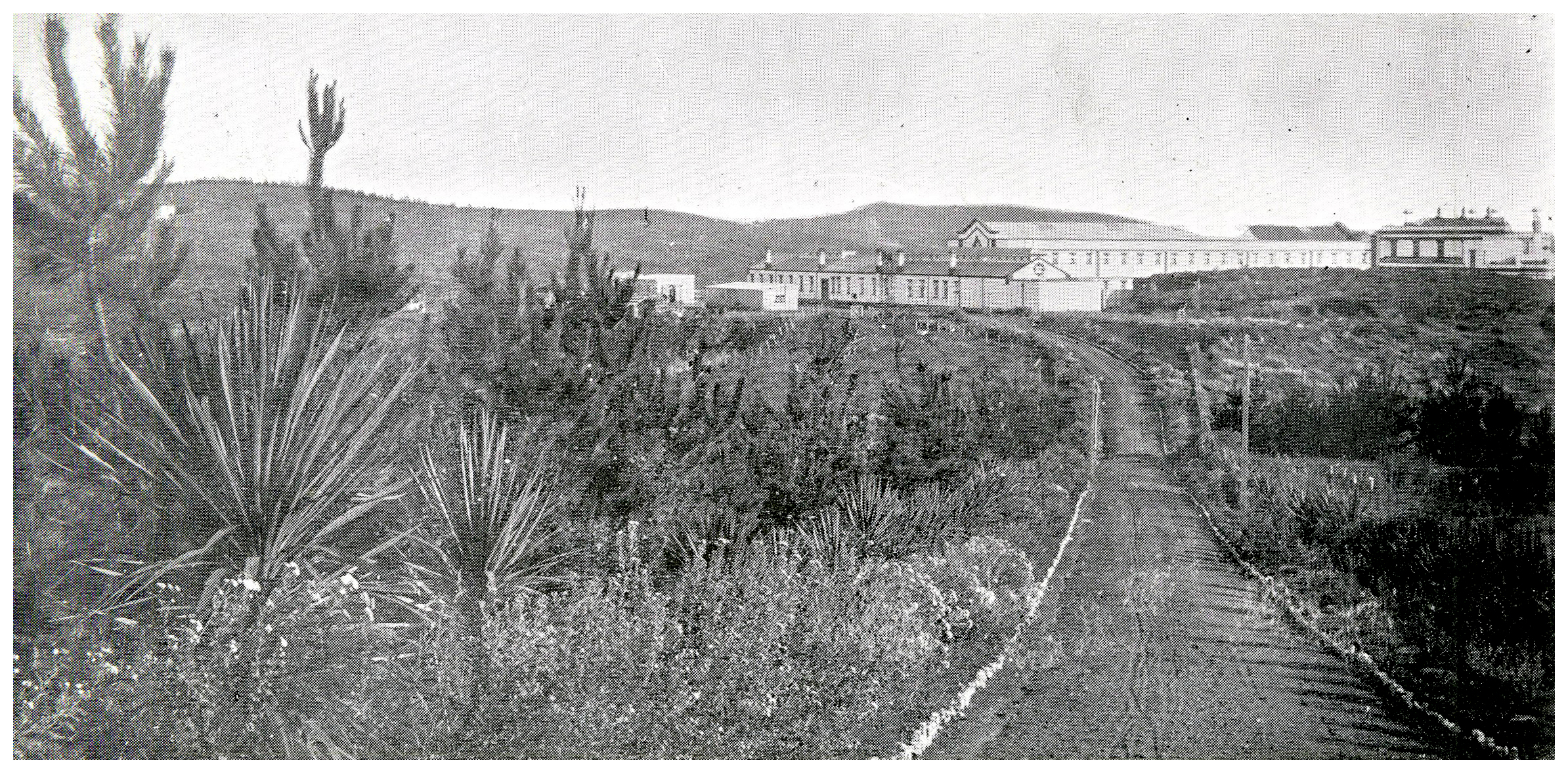
Waikeria Prison in 1923

7013018 had a population of 588 in the 2023 New Zealand census, an increase of 54 people (10.1%) since the 2018 census, and an increase of 114 people (24.1%) since the 2013 census. The gender ratio is distorted by the prison population. There were 474 males, 108 females, and 3 people of other genders in 75 dwellings. 3.6% of people identified as LGBTIQ+. There were 42 people (7.1%) aged under 15 years, 81 (13.8%) aged 15 to 29, 402 (68.4%) aged 30 to 64, and 60 (10.2%) aged 65 or older.

People could identify as more than one ethnicity. The results were 59.7% European (Pākehā); 48.0% Māori; 8.7% Pasifika; 3.6% Asian; 1.0% Middle Eastern, Latin American and African New Zealanders (MELAA); and 4.1% other, which includes people giving their ethnicity as "New Zealander". English was spoken by 96.9%, Māori by 13.8%, Samoan by 1.5%, and other languages by 4.6%. No language could be spoken by 0.5% (e.g. too young to talk). New Zealand Sign Language was known by 1.0%. The percentage of people born overseas was 9.2, compared with 28.8% nationally.

Religious affiliations were 25.0% Christian, 0.5% Hindu, 1.0% Islam, 11.2% Māori religious beliefs, 0.5% Buddhist, 1.0% New Age, and 2.6% other religions. People who answered that they had no religion were 55.6%, and 4.6% of people did not answer the census question.

Of those at least 15 years old, 39 (7.1%) people had a bachelor's or higher degree, 348 (63.7%) had a post-high school certificate or diploma, and 165 (30.2%) people exclusively held high school qualifications. 18 people (3.3%) earned over $100,000 compared to 12.1% nationally. The employment status of those at least 15 was 189 (34.6%) full-time, 60 (11.0%) part-time, and 27 (4.9%) unemployed.

=== Puniu statistical area ===
Puniu statistical area covers 674.02 km^{2} (260.24 sq mi) and had an estimated population of 1,610 as of June 2025, with a population density of 2.4 people per km^{2}.

Historical population of Puniu
Year	Pop.	±% p.a.
2006	1,500	—
2013	1,407	−0.91%
2018	1,488	+1.13%
2023	1,587	+1.30%

Puniu had a population of 1,587 in the 2023 New Zealand census, an increase of 99 people (6.7%) since the 2018 census, and an increase of 180 people (12.8%) since the 2013 census. There were 1,011 males, 570 females, and 6 people of other genders in 438 dwellings. 2.3% of people identified as LGBTIQ+. The median age was 37.9 years (compared with 38.1 years nationally). There were 291 people (18.3%) aged under 15 years, 258 (16.3%) aged 15 to 29, 867 (54.6%) aged 30 to 64, and 171 (10.8%) aged 65 or older.

People could identify as more than one ethnicity. The results were 76.6% European (Pākehā); 29.3% Māori; 4.5% Pasifika; 4.9% Asian; 0.6% Middle Eastern, Latin American and African New Zealanders (MELAA); and 3.2% other, which includes people giving their ethnicity as "New Zealander". English was spoken by 96.4%, Māori by 7.2%, Samoan by 0.9%, and other languages by 6.0%. No language could be spoken by 1.9% (e.g. too young to talk). New Zealand Sign Language was known by 0.8%. The percentage of people born overseas was 12.3, compared with 28.8% nationally.

Religious affiliations were 25.7% Christian, 0.8% Hindu, 0.6% Islam, 4.3% Māori religious beliefs, 0.2% Buddhist, 0.6% New Age, and 2.5% other religions. People who answered that they had no religion were 59.7%, and 6.4% of people did not answer the census question.

Of those at least 15 years old, 156 (12.0%) people had a bachelor's or higher degree, 780 (60.2%) had a post-high school certificate or diploma, and 360 (27.8%) people exclusively held high school qualifications. The median income was $28,600, compared with $41,500 nationally. 96 people (7.4%) earned over $100,000 compared to 12.1% nationally. The employment status of those at least 15 was 654 (50.5%) full-time, 165 (12.7%) part-time, and 39 (3.0%) unemployed.

== Education ==
Korakonui School is a Year 1–8 co-educational state primary school. It has a roll of 159 as of July 2026. The school opened in 1911.

== Climate ==
Climate data for Waikeria (1991–2020 normals, extremes 1957–present)
Month	Jan	Feb	Mar	Apr	May	Jun	Jul	Aug	Sep	Oct	Nov	Dec	Year
Record high °C (°F)	32.2 (90.0)	32.1 (89.8)	32.8 (91.0)	28.2 (82.8)	24.9 (76.8)	21.1 (70.0)	20.0 (68.0)	21.8 (71.2)	25.0 (77.0)	28.0 (82.4)	29.7 (85.5)	31.3 (88.3)	32.8 (91.0)
Mean maximum °C (°F)	28.6 (83.5)	29.0 (84.2)	27.8 (82.0)	24.8 (76.6)	21.0 (69.8)	18.3 (64.9)	17.2 (63.0)	18.0 (64.4)	20.1 (68.2)	22.0 (71.6)	24.4 (75.9)	27.0 (80.6)	29.9 (85.8)
Mean daily maximum °C (°F)	25.0 (77.0)	25.5 (77.9)	23.6 (74.5)	20.5 (68.9)	17.1 (62.8)	14.5 (58.1)	14.0 (57.2)	14.9 (58.8)	16.6 (61.9)	18.3 (64.9)	20.3 (68.5)	22.8 (73.0)	19.4 (67.0)
Daily mean °C (°F)	18.8 (65.8)	19.3 (66.7)	17.1 (62.8)	14.6 (58.3)	11.8 (53.2)	9.4 (48.9)	8.8 (47.8)	9.6 (49.3)	11.4 (52.5)	13.1 (55.6)	14.9 (58.8)	17.3 (63.1)	13.8 (56.9)
Mean daily minimum °C (°F)	12.5 (54.5)	13.1 (55.6)	10.6 (51.1)	8.6 (47.5)	6.5 (43.7)	4.3 (39.7)	3.7 (38.7)	4.3 (39.7)	6.2 (43.2)	8.0 (46.4)	9.5 (49.1)	11.9 (53.4)	8.3 (46.9)
Mean minimum °C (°F)	5.7 (42.3)	6.0 (42.8)	3.6 (38.5)	0.6 (33.1)	−0.8 (30.6)	−3.0 (26.6)	−3.2 (26.2)	−2.2 (28.0)	−0.6 (30.9)	1.7 (35.1)	3.0 (37.4)	5.1 (41.2)	−4.0 (24.8)
Record low °C (°F)	1.2 (34.2)	1.3 (34.3)	−1.8 (28.8)	−3.1 (26.4)	−5.6 (21.9)	−5.9 (21.4)	−6.7 (19.9)	−6.6 (20.1)	−8.4 (16.9)	−2.8 (27.0)	−0.3 (31.5)	−0.9 (30.4)	−8.4 (16.9)
Average rainfall mm (inches)	74.1 (2.92)	68.9 (2.71)	78.2 (3.08)	79.3 (3.12)	98.8 (3.89)	113.5 (4.47)	116.9 (4.60)	115.1 (4.53)	93.9 (3.70)	101.6 (4.00)	82.1 (3.23)	92.5 (3.64)	1,114.9 (43.89)
Source: NIWA (rain 1981–2010)
