= Ōtewā =

Community in Waikato, New Zealand

- Village
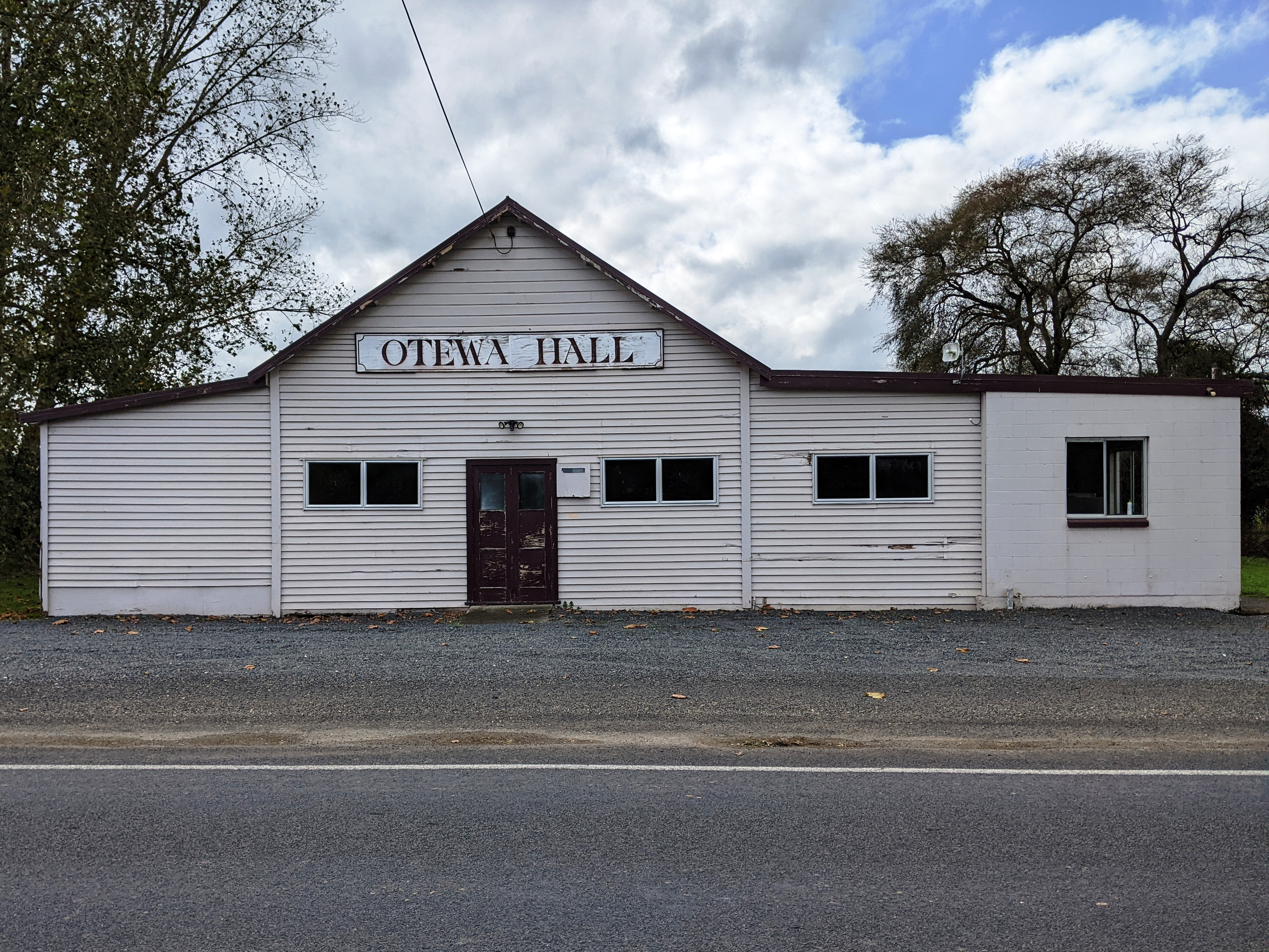
- Ōtewā Community Hall
- Interactive map of Ōtewā
- Coordinates: 38.231°S 175.296°E
- Country: New Zealand
- Region: Waikato Region
- District: Ōtorohanga District
- Ward: Waipā General Ward
- Electorates: Taranaki-King Country; Te Tai Hauāuru (Māori)

Government
  - Territorial Authority: Ōtorohanga District Council
  - Regional council: Waikato Regional Council
  - Mayor of Ōtorohanga: Rodney Dow
  - Taranaki-King Country MP: Barbara Kuriger
  - Te Tai Hauāuru MP: Debbie Ngarewa-Packer

Area
  - Territorial: 174.66 km^{2} (67.44 sq mi)

Population (2023 Census)
  - Territorial: 294
  - Density: 1.68/km^{2} (4.36/sq mi)
- Time zone: UTC+12 (NZST)
  - Summer (DST): UTC+13 (NZDT)

Ōtewā is a rural community in the Ōtorohanga District and Waikato region of New Zealand's North Island.

== Demographics ==
Ōtewā covers 174.66 km^{2} (67.44 sq mi). It is part of the larger Maihiihi statistical area.

Historical population
Year	Pop.	±% p.a.
2013	309	—
2018	285	−1.60%
2023	294	+0.62%

Ōtewā had a population of 294 in the 2023 New Zealand census, an increase of 9 people (3.2%) since the 2018 census, and a decrease of 15 people (−4.9%) since the 2013 census. There were 156 males and 135 females in 105 dwellings. There were 75 people (25.5%) aged under 15 years, 45 (15.3%) aged 15 to 29, 123 (41.8%) aged 30 to 64, and 48 (16.3%) aged 65 or older.

People could identify as more than one ethnicity. The results were 85.7% European (Pākehā), 25.5% Māori, 3.1% Asian, and 8.2% other, which includes people giving their ethnicity as "New Zealander". English was spoken by 95.9%, Māori by 3.1%, and other languages by 3.1%. No language could be spoken by 1.0% (e.g. too young to talk). The percentage of people born overseas was 9.2, compared with 28.8% nationally.

Religious affiliations were 25.5% Christian, 1.0% Hindu, 1.0% Māori religious beliefs, and 1.0% other religions. People who answered that they had no religion were 58.2%, and 12.2% of people did not answer the census question.

Of those at least 15 years old, 15 (6.8%) people had a bachelor's or higher degree, 138 (63.0%) had a post-high school certificate or diploma, and 57 (26.0%) people exclusively held high school qualifications. 18 people (8.2%) earned over $100,000 compared to 12.1% nationally. The employment status of those at least 15 was 129 (58.9%) full-time, 27 (12.3%) part-time, and 3 (1.4%) unemployed.

== Marae ==
The local Ōtewā Pā is a marae of the Ngāti Maniapoto hapū of Ngāti Matakore, Ngutu, Parewaeono, Rereahu, Te Kanawa and Urunumia. It includes Ko Te Hokingamai ki te Nehenehenui wharenui.

== Education ==
Ōtewā School is a Year 1–8 co-educational state primary school. It is a decile 8 school with a roll of 56 as of July 2026. The school opened in 1916.

== Notable people ==
- Kepa Hamuera Anaha Ehau (1885 – 1970): tribal leader, law clerk, interpreter, soldier, historian, orator
