= Honikiwi =

Settlement in Waikato, New Zealand

- Village
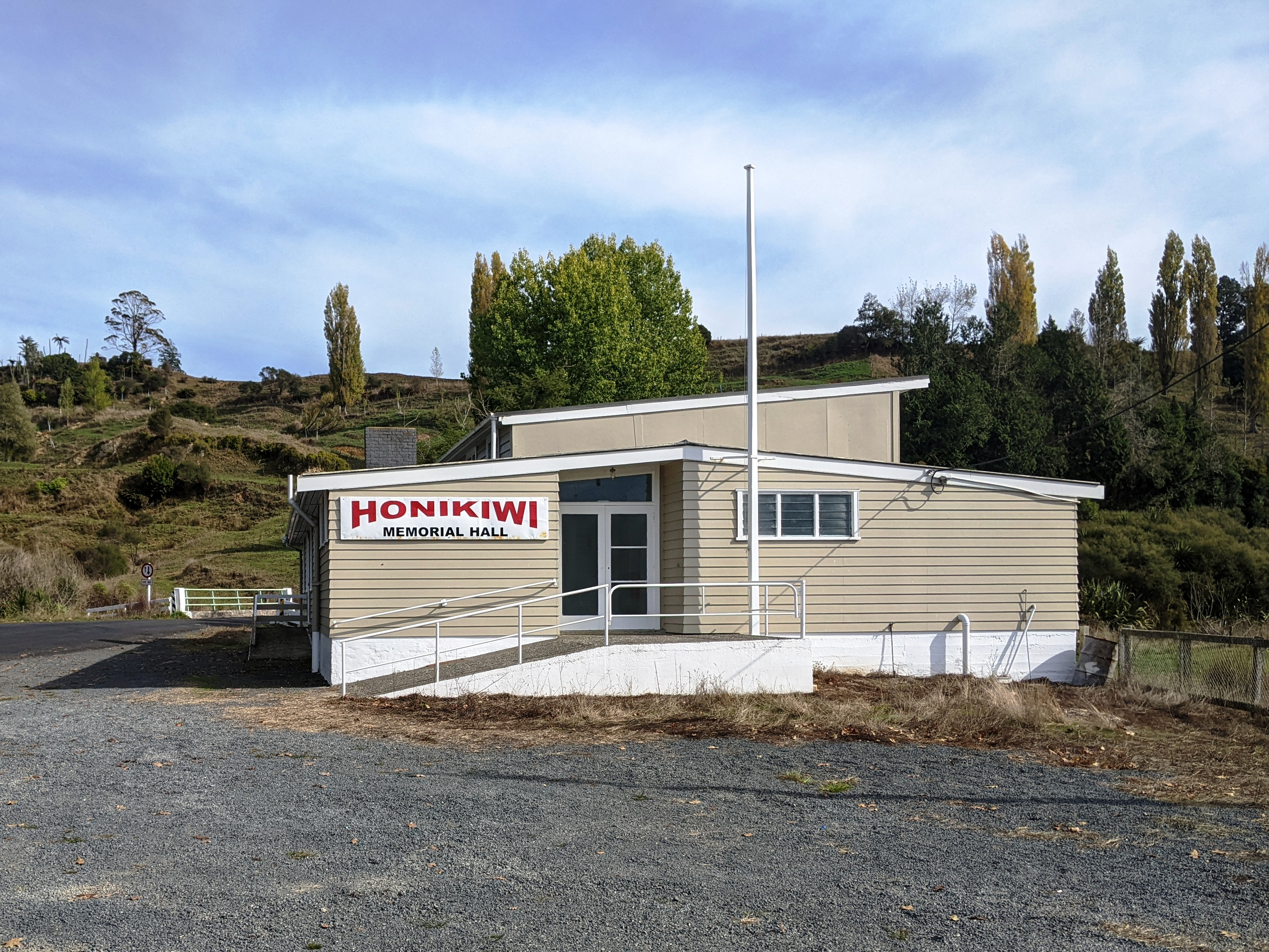
- Honikiwi Memorial Hall
- Interactive map of Honikiwi
- Coordinates: 38.147°S 175.131°E
- Country: New Zealand
- Region: Waikato Region
- District: Ōtorohanga District
- Ward: Kāwhia-Tihiroa General Ward
- Electorates: Taranaki-King Country; Te Tai Hauāuru (Māori)

Government
  - Territorial Authority: Ōtorohanga District Council
  - Regional council: Waikato Regional Council
  - Mayor of Ōtorohanga: Rodney Dow
  - Taranaki-King Country MP: Barbara Kuriger
  - Te Tai Hauāuru MP: Debbie Ngarewa-Packer

Area
  - Territorial: 56.87 km^{2} (21.96 sq mi)

Population (2023 Census)
  - Territorial: 210
  - Density: 3.7/km^{2} (9.6/sq mi)
- Time zone: UTC+12 (NZST)
  - Summer (DST): UTC+13 (NZDT)

Honikiwi is a locality in the Ōtorohanga District and Waikato region of New Zealand. It is northwest of Ōtorohanga.

== Demographics ==
Honikiwi locality covers 56.87 km^{2} (21.96 sq mi). It is part of the larger Honikiwi statistical area.

Historical population for the locality
| Year | Pop. | ±% p.a. |
|---|---|---|
| 2006 | 165 | — |
| 2013 | 171 | +0.51% |
| 2018 | 204 | +3.59% |
| 2023 | 210 | +0.58% |

Honikiwi locality had a population of 210 in the 2023 New Zealand census, an increase of 6 people (2.9%) since the 2018 census, and an increase of 39 people (22.8%) since the 2013 census. There were 105 males and 105 females in 72 dwellings. 2.9% of people identified as LGBTIQ+. The median age was 35.1 years (compared with 38.1 years nationally). There were 51 people (24.3%) aged under 15 years, 33 (15.7%) aged 15 to 29, 93 (44.3%) aged 30 to 64, and 33 (15.7%) aged 65 or older.

People could identify as more than one ethnicity. The results were 90.0% European (Pākehā), 22.9% Māori, 2.9% Pasifika, and 2.9% other, which includes people giving their ethnicity as "New Zealander". English was spoken by 100.0%, Māori by 4.3%, and other languages by 7.1%. The percentage of people born overseas was 10.0, compared with 28.8% nationally.

Religious affiliations were 28.6% Christian, 1.4% Māori religious beliefs, and 1.4% New Age. People who answered that they had no religion were 62.9%, and 8.6% of people did not answer the census question.

Of those at least 15 years old, 21 (13.2%) people had a bachelor's or higher degree, 96 (60.4%) had a post-high school certificate or diploma, and 45 (28.3%) people exclusively held high school qualifications. The median income was $38,900, compared with $41,500 nationally. 18 people (11.3%) earned over $100,000 compared to 12.1% nationally. The employment status of those at least 15 was 90 (56.6%) full-time, 21 (13.2%) part-time, and 6 (3.8%) unemployed.

=== Honikiwi statistical area ===
Honikiwi statistical area, which also includes Puketotara, covers 245.61 km^{2} (94.83 sq mi). It had an estimated population of 1,640 as of June 2025, with a population density of 6.7 people per km^{2}.

Historical population for the statistical area
| Year | Pop. | ±% p.a. |
|---|---|---|
| 2006 | 1,176 | — |
| 2013 | 1,356 | +2.06% |
| 2018 | 1,581 | +3.12% |
| 2023 | 1,602 | +0.26% |

Honikiwi had a population of 1,602 in the 2023 New Zealand census, an increase of 21 people (1.3%) since the 2018 census, and an increase of 246 people (18.1%) since the 2013 census. There were 828 males, 771 females, and 6 people of other genders in 576 dwellings. 2.2% of people identified as LGBTIQ+. The median age was 39.3 years (compared with 38.1 years nationally). There were 360 people (22.5%) aged under 15 years, 237 (14.8%) aged 15 to 29, 747 (46.6%) aged 30 to 64, and 258 (16.1%) aged 65 or older.

People could identify as more than one ethnicity. The results were 86.7% European (Pākehā); 24.2% Māori; 3.0% Pasifika; 2.4% Asian; 0.4% Middle Eastern, Latin American and African New Zealanders (MELAA); and 3.7% other, which includes people giving their ethnicity as "New Zealander". English was spoken by 97.6%, Māori by 4.3%, Samoan by 0.2%, and other languages by 5.2%. No language could be spoken by 1.7% (e.g. too young to talk). New Zealand Sign Language was known by 0.4%. The percentage of people born overseas was 13.5, compared with 28.8% nationally.

Religious affiliations were 27.7% Christian, 0.2% Hindu, 0.6% Māori religious beliefs, 0.4% New Age, 0.2% Jewish, and 0.7% other religions. People who answered that they had no religion were 61.8%, and 8.4% of people did not answer the census question.

Of those at least 15 years old, 219 (17.6%) people had a bachelor's or higher degree, 705 (56.8%) had a post-high school certificate or diploma, and 318 (25.6%) people exclusively held high school qualifications. The median income was $44,100, compared with $41,500 nationally. 150 people (12.1%) earned over $100,000 compared to 12.1% nationally. The employment status of those at least 15 was 711 (57.2%) full-time, 177 (14.3%) part-time, and 21 (1.7%) unemployed.

== Education ==
Honikiwi requested a school in 1906, but the application was rejected. The community offered to build a school if the Board of Education would fund a teacher, but although a site was allocated and material for the school procured, permission to build was denied. The school was allowed to proceed in December 1907, and was built by the end of the year.

The school building was replaced in 1930, with the opening notable for a fight breaking out.

The school was still open in 1973 but had closed by 2018.
