= Kio Kio =

Rural community in New Zealand

- Village
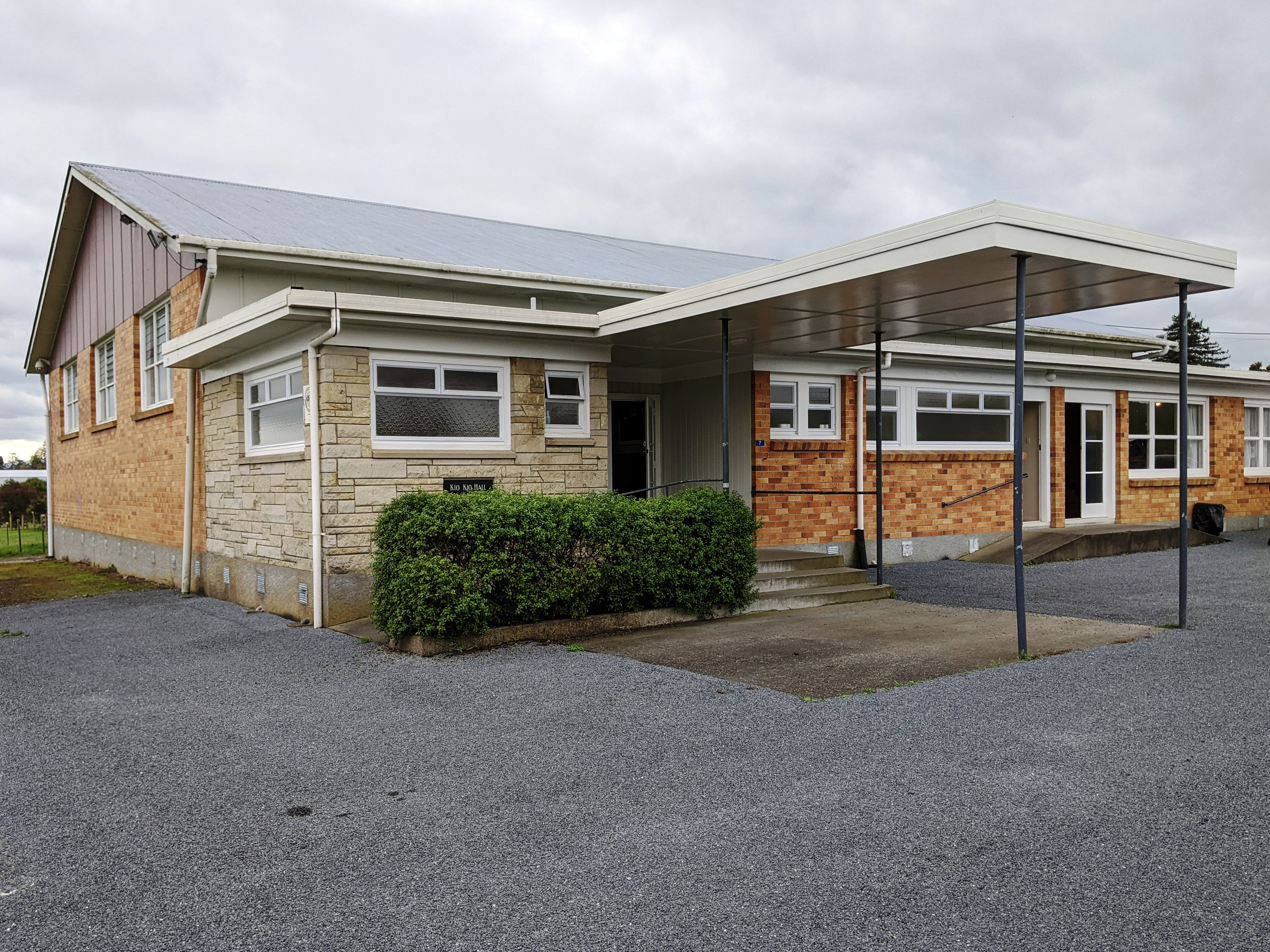
- Kio Kio community hall
- Interactive map of Kio Kio
- Coordinates: 38.162°S 175.277°E
- Country: New Zealand
- Region: Waikato Region
- District: Ōtorohanga District
- Ward: Kiokio-Korakonui General Ward
- Electorates: Taranaki-King Country; Te Tai Hauāuru (Māori)

Government
  - Territorial Authority: Ōtorohanga District Council
  - Regional council: Waikato Regional Council
  - Mayor of Ōtorohanga: Rodney Dow
  - Taranaki-King Country MP: Barbara Kuriger
  - Te Tai Hauāuru MP: Debbie Ngarewa-Packer

Area
  - Territorial: 32.16 km^{2} (12.42 sq mi)

Population (2023 Census)
  - Territorial: 408
  - Density: 12.7/km^{2} (32.9/sq mi)
- Time zone: UTC+12 (NZST)
  - Summer (DST): UTC+13 (NZDT)

Kio Kio or Kiokio is a rural community in the Ōtorohanga District and Waikato region of New Zealand's North Island. It is located just north-east of Ōtorohanga, on State Highway 3 between Ōtorohanga and Te Awamutu.

It is the location of the former Kiokio railway station on the North Island Main Trunk. Traffic at the station was "rapidly increasing" from 1913.

Kiokio is the Māori word for a number of a plant species, including the native fern Parablechnum novae-zelandiae.

Kio Kio has a rugby union club, which plays in the King Country league in red and black. In 2001, a club player was accused of wrenching and squeezing an opponent's testicle. In 2009, two club players, a club official and two club fans received lifetime bans from rugby union for attacking a referee and tough judge after the club lost the King Country Rugby Tournament.

== Demographics ==
Kio Kio covers 32.16 km^{2} (12.42 sq mi). It is part of the larger Te Kawa statistical area.

Historical population
Year	Pop.	±% p.a.
2006	348	—
2013	366	+0.72%
2018	396	+1.59%
2023	408	+0.60%

Kio Kio had a population of 408 in the 2023 New Zealand census, an increase of 12 people (3.0%) since the 2018 census, and an increase of 42 people (11.5%) since the 2013 census. There were 204 males, 204 females, and 3 people of other genders in 144 dwellings. 0.7% of people identified as LGBTIQ+. There were 93 people (22.8%) aged under 15 years, 72 (17.6%) aged 15 to 29, 183 (44.9%) aged 30 to 64, and 63 (15.4%) aged 65 or older.

People could identify as more than one ethnicity. The results were 89.7% European (Pākehā), 11.8% Māori, 2.2% Pasifika, 6.6% Asian, and 2.9% other, which includes people giving their ethnicity as "New Zealander". English was spoken by 97.8%, Māori by 2.2%, and other languages by 5.1%. No language could be spoken by 2.2% (e.g. too young to talk). The percentage of people born overseas was 11.8, compared with 28.8% nationally.

Religious affiliations were 27.2% Christian, 2.2% Buddhist, and 1.5% other religions. People who answered that they had no religion were 58.8%, and 10.3% of people did not answer the census question.

Of those at least 15 years old, 54 (17.1%) people had a bachelor's or higher degree, 195 (61.9%) had a post-high school certificate or diploma, and 69 (21.9%) people exclusively held high school qualifications. 33 people (10.5%) earned over $100,000 compared to 12.1% nationally. The employment status of those at least 15 was 201 (63.8%) full-time, 45 (14.3%) part-time, and 3 (1.0%) unemployed.

== Education ==
Kio Kio School is a Year 1-8 co-educational state primary school. It is a decile 7 school with a roll of 151 as of July 2026. The school opened in 1905.
