= Maihiihi =

Settlement in Waikato, New Zealand

- Village
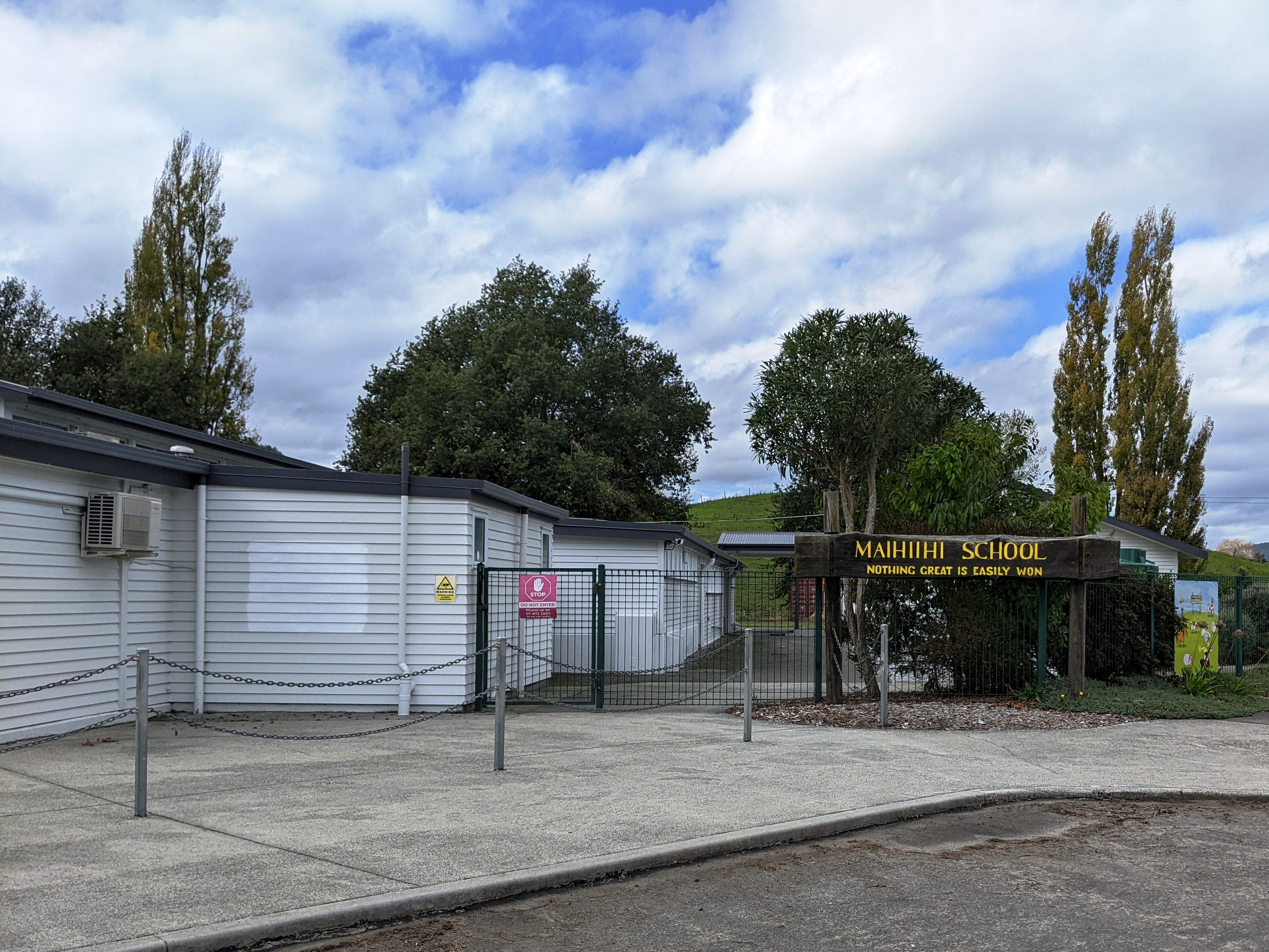
- Maihiihi Primary School
- Interactive map of Maihiihi
- Coordinates: 38.214676°S 175.383796°E
- Country: New Zealand
- Region: Waikato Region
- District: Ōtorohanga District
- Ward: Waipā General Ward
- Electorates: Taranaki-King Country; Te Tai Hauāuru (Māori)

Government
  - Territorial Authority: Ōtorohanga District Council
  - Regional council: Waikato Regional Council
  - Mayor of Ōtorohanga: Rodney Dow
  - Taranaki-King Country MP: Barbara Kuriger
  - Te Tai Hauāuru MP: Debbie Ngarewa-Packer

Area
  - Territorial: 73.23 km^{2} (28.27 sq mi)

Population (2023 Census)
  - Territorial: 198
  - Density: 2.70/km^{2} (7.00/sq mi)
- Time zone: UTC+12 (NZST)
  - Summer (DST): UTC+13 (NZDT)

Maihiihi is a rural community in the Ōtorohanga District and Waikato region of New Zealand's North Island.

== Demographics ==
Maihiihi locality covers 73.24 km^{2} (28.28 sq mi). The locality is part of the larger Maihiihi statistical area.

Historical population of the Maihiihi locality
Year	Pop.	±% p.a.
2006	243	—
2013	228	−0.91%
2018	219	−0.80%
2023	198	−2.00%

Maihiihi had a population of 198 in the 2023 New Zealand census, a decrease of 21 people (−9.6%) since the 2018 census, and a decrease of 30 people (−13.2%) since the 2013 census. There were 99 males and 96 females in 69 dwellings. The median age was 34.8 years (compared with 38.1 years nationally). There were 51 people (25.8%) aged under 15 years, 30 (15.2%) aged 15 to 29, 99 (50.0%) aged 30 to 64, and 18 (9.1%) aged 65 or older.

People could identify as more than one ethnicity. The results were 86.4% European (Pākehā); 16.7% Māori; 6.1% Asian; and 4.5% Middle Eastern, Latin American and African New Zealanders (MELAA). English was spoken by 97.0%, Māori by 3.0%, and other languages by 6.1%. No language could be spoken by 1.5% (e.g. too young to talk). The percentage of people born overseas was 12.1, compared with 28.8% nationally.

Religious affiliations were 22.7% Christian, 1.5% Buddhist, and 3.0% other religions. People who answered that they had no religion were 63.6%, and 6.1% of people did not answer the census question.

Of those at least 15 years old, 18 (12.2%) people had a bachelor's or higher degree, 84 (57.1%) had a post-high school certificate or diploma, and 42 (28.6%) people exclusively held high school qualifications. The median income was $50,800, compared with $41,500 nationally. 21 people (14.3%) earned over $100,000 compared to 12.1% nationally. The employment status of those at least 15 was 90 (61.2%) full-time, 24 (16.3%) part-time, and 6 (4.1%) unemployed.

=== Maihiihi statistical area ===
Maihiihi statistical area, which also includes Ōtewā, covers 469.06 km^{2} (181.11 sq mi). It had an estimated population of 1,970 as of June 2025, with a population density of 4.2 people per km^{2}.

Historical population of the statistical area
Year	Pop.	±% p.a.
2006	1,779	—
2013	1,848	+0.55%
2018	1,833	−0.16%
2023	1,875	+0.45%

Maihiihi statistical area had a population of 1,875 in the 2023 New Zealand census, an increase of 42 people (2.3%) since the 2018 census, and an increase of 27 people (1.5%) since the 2013 census. There were 1,002 males, 867 females, and 3 people of other genders in 666 dwellings. 1.8% of people identified as LGBTIQ+. The median age was 36.6 years (compared with 38.1 years nationally). There were 453 people (24.2%) aged under 15 years, 303 (16.2%) aged 15 to 29, 843 (45.0%) aged 30 to 64, and 279 (14.9%) aged 65 or older.

People could identify as more than one ethnicity. The results were 87.4% European (Pākehā); 21.4% Māori; 1.3% Pasifika; 4.2% Asian; 1.0% Middle Eastern, Latin American and African New Zealanders (MELAA); and 2.9% other, which includes people giving their ethnicity as "New Zealander". English was spoken by 97.1%, Māori by 3.5%, Samoan by 0.2%, and other languages by 4.6%. No language could be spoken by 2.1% (e.g. too young to talk). New Zealand Sign Language was known by 0.3%. The percentage of people born overseas was 11.0, compared with 28.8% nationally.

Religious affiliations were 26.9% Christian, 0.5% Hindu, 1.0% Māori religious beliefs, 0.3% Buddhist, 0.5% New Age, and 1.3% other religions. People who answered that they had no religion were 61.1%, and 8.5% of people did not answer the census question.

Of those at least 15 years old, 174 (12.2%) people had a bachelor's or higher degree, 855 (60.1%) had a post-high school certificate or diploma, and 399 (28.1%) people exclusively held high school qualifications. The median income was $46,700, compared with $41,500 nationally. 132 people (9.3%) earned over $100,000 compared to 12.1% nationally. The employment status of those at least 15 was 810 (57.0%) full-time, 222 (15.6%) part-time, and 30 (2.1%) unemployed.

== Education ==
Maihiihi School is a Year 1-8 co-educational state primary school. It is a decile 7 school with a roll of 42 as of July 2026.

The school gained national attention in November 2016, for a handwritten note and parcel the principal gave an autistic student.

It has also opposed the use of seclusion rooms for autistic students.

There was a native school at Maihiihi from 1905 to 1916. Maihiihi School opened in 1917. The school celebrated a jubilee in 1981.
