= February 2026 New Zealand storms =

February 2026 storms
Meteorological history
- Duration: 13–17 February 2026

Overall effects
- Fatalities: 1
- Areas affected: North Island, South Island

In mid-February 2026, a wet weather system brought heavy rain, flash flooding and land slips to parts of New Zealand's North and South Islands. States of emergency were declared in the Ōtorohanga, Waipā , Tararua, Manawatū, Rangitīkei Districts and Banks Peninsula. Plane, ferry, train and road travel were disrupted in several districts in both islands. One man was killed after his car was submerged at Puketotara on State Highway 39 on 14 February.

== Preparations ==
On 13 February 2026, MetService issued an orange heavy rain warning for the Bay of Plenty east of Ōpōtiki and the Gisborne District north of Tolaga Bay. A yellow heavy rain warning was also issued for the rest of the North Island. That same day, the Hastings District Council issued an evacuation order for residents of the Clifton Motor Camp's campground near Cape Kidnappers due to a high landslide risk.

== Timeline ==
During the week leading up to 19 February 2026, the Wellington Region, the Manawatū-Whanganui east and north of Palmerston North, the Waikato region between Palmerston North and the Coromandel Peninsula, the eastern Northland Region, Bay of Plenty, Hawke's Bay and Gisborne District in the North Island experienced rainfall totals of 50 to 100 mm. In addition, the ranges and foothills of the central North Island experienced 100 to 200 mm of rain during that week. Other parts of the North Island including Taranaki, the western Waikato, the Auckland Region, the western Northland Region, and the rest of Manawatū-Whanganui experienced between 10 and 30 mm of rainfall during that week.

In the South Island, Christchurch, the Banks Peninsula, the northern Canterbury Region and the Southern Alps of the Westland District experienced rainfall totals of 50 to 100 mm during the week leading up to 19 February. Other areas including parts of Otago between Dunedin and Balclutha, the Canterbury high country, Fiordland and much of the Westland District south of Greymouth experienced rainfall totals of 30 to 50 mm. During that seven-day period, the rest of the South Island recorded rainfalls of less than 30mm.

=== North Island ===
On 14 February, 80 people were evacuated following flash flooding in the Ōtorohanga District. A local state of emergency was also declared. Many road and highways in the district were flooded. The body of a man was also recovered from a submerged car at Puketotara on State Highway 39.

On 14 February, the Waipā District also experienced heavy rain and flash flooding, leading to a local state of emergency.

On 15 February, a state of emergency was declared in the Tararua District in response to flash flooding. Red heavy rain warnings were also issued in the Manawatū, Rangitikei and Ruapehu Districts. That same day, states of emergency were declared in the Manawatū and Rangitīkei Districts in response to heavy rain and flash flooding overnight.

On 17 February, flash flooding in the Manawatū–Whanganui led to another local state of emergency being declared.

==== Wellington Region ====
On 15 February, stormy weather also caused the cancellation of several Interislander and Bluebridge ferry services across the Cook Strait.

On 16 February, the Wellington Region experienced strong winds, leading to the cancellation of all Wellington train services in the morning and numerous flights. A train collision with a fallen tree also disrupted travel near Wairarapa the previous day. On 16 February, 30,000 properties in the Manawatū–Whanganui and Wellington regions experienced power outages due to strong winds toppling trees and power lines. Local authorities also evacuated several homes in Masterton due to the threat of fallen trees. On 16 February wind speeds of up to 193 kilometres per hour (120 mph) were recorded at Mount Kaukau and 128 kilometres per hour (80 mph) were recorded at Wellington Airport. The last time winds that strong were recorded in those areas was in 2013. The suburb of Kelburn had a maximum southerly wind speed of 133 kilometres per hour (83 mph), which was the highest wind speed the area experienced in that direction in over a decade. At 7am a wind gust of 240 kilometres per hour (150 mph) was recorded in the Wairarapa. On the night between 15 and 16 February, the Wairarapa experienced 256.4 millimetres (10.09 in) of rainfall, Wellington experienced 121 millimetres (4.8 in) and the Tararua District recorded 101.9 millimetres (4.01 in).

On 17 February flooding also destroyed a single-lane bridge in the southern Wairarapa district, isolating several local settlements including Lake Ferry, Ngawi and Whāngaimoana. The Wellington City Council made green waste disposal at the Southern Landfill free for a week following 19 February due to garden damage caused by the storm. Some homes in the south coast of Wellington were coated with spray that may have contained faecal matter, blown by the wind after about a billion litres of raw sewage had been dumped into the ocean near Moa Point due to a wastewater treatment plant failure. Wellington Water said at the time that the spray might have just been uncontaminated salt spray.

On 20 February, a landslip rendered a hillside home in the Lower Hutt's Stokes Valley uninhabitable. On about 20 February, Wellington Zoo created a fundraising campaign to care for birds swept up by the storm. These birds included albatrosses, penguins and petrels. A vet at the zoo said that they had been "overwhelmed" by the amount of birds needing treatment, and were running out of space for them.

On 23 February, 300 homes in Wellington, Porirua and the Hutt Valley were still without power. The storm also caused a large amount of driftwood to appear along several kilometres of Paekākāriki beach, with one resident stating that "there's no sand, it's just all logs and then mulch".

=== South Island ===
On 14 February, the Christchurch City Council issued a boil water notice for several eastern Christchurch suburbs due to bacteria contamination in the Rawhiti water supply zone caused by heavy rain. On 15 February, heavy rain warnings were also issued for Banks Peninsula and the Canterbury Plains.

On 16 February State Highway 75 was closed between Tai Tapu and Akaroa due to flooding.

On 17 February, Banks Peninsula and Christchurch also experienced heavy rain and flash flooding, leading to a state of emergency being declared in the former. A boil water notice was issued in Wainui after the local water supply was contaminated by flooding.

On 18 February, a landslip in Dunedin's Musselburgh suburb led to the evacuation of seven hillside properties on Belmont Lane. One of these properties was subsequently rendered unsafe and classified as "red stickered."

On 21 February, 40 Student Volunteer Army volunteers from the University of Canterbury assisted Civil Defence and the Taskforce Kiwi volunteers in clearing up silt and flood damage in the Banks Peninsula.

On 23 February, the state of emergency in the Banks Peninsula was lifted by Mayor of Christchurch Phil Mauger. That same day, Christchurch City Council controller Duncan Sandeman confirmed that three properties in Banks Peninsula had been red-stickered and that two more had been yellow-stickered.
