= Hamuera =

Hamuera is a given name. It is a Māori transliteration of the name Samuel.

Notable people with the name include:

- Hamuera Tamahau Mahupuku (c. 1842–1904), New Zealand Māori tribal leader
- Kepa Hamuera Anaha Ehau (1885–1970), New Zealand tribal leader

== See also ==
- Hamuera, marae in Puketapu, Hawke's Bay
