= Kiokio =

Kiokio is a Māori word that may refer to:

== Plants ==
- Lomaria discolor, syn. Blechnum discolor, New Zealand fern species
- Parablechnum novae-zelandiae, syn. Blechnum novae-zelandiae, New Zealand fern species resembling a palm leaf
- Parablechnum procerum, syn. Blechnum procerum, New Zealand mountain fern species

== Schools ==
- Kio Kio, a rural community in Waikato Region, New Zealand
- Kio Kio School, a rural school in Waikato Region, New Zealand
- Kiokio railway station, former railway station
