= Puketotara =

Community on North Island, New Zealand

- Locality
- Interactive map of Puketotara
- Coordinates: 38.049°S 175.168°E
- Country: New Zealand
- Region: Waikato Region
- District: Ōtorohanga District
- Ward: Kāwhia-Tihiroa General Ward
- Electorates: Taranaki-King Country; Te Tai Hauāuru (Māori)

Government
  - Territorial Authority: Ōtorohanga District Council
  - Regional council: Waikato Regional Council
  - Mayor of Ōtorohanga: Rodney Dow
  - Taranaki-King Country MP: Barbara Kuriger
  - Te Tai Hauāuru MP: Debbie Ngarewa-Packer

Area
  - Territorial: 60.61 km^{2} (23.40 sq mi)

Population (2023 Census)
  - Territorial: 435
  - Density: 7.18/km^{2} (18.6/sq mi)
- Time zone: UTC+12 (NZST)
  - Summer (DST): UTC+13 (NZDT)

Puketotara (Māori: Puketōtara) is a rural community in the Ōtorohanga District and Waikato region of New Zealand's North Island.

The New Zealand Ministry for Culture and Heritage gives a translation of "totara hill" for Puketōtara.

== Demographics ==
Puketotara covers 60.61 km^{2} (23.40 sq mi). It is part of the larger Honikiwi statistical area.

Historical population
Year	Pop.	±% p.a.
2013	366	—
2018	456	+4.50%
2023	435	−0.94%

Puketotara had a population of 435 in the 2023 New Zealand census, a decrease of 21 people (−4.6%) since the 2018 census, and an increase of 69 people (18.9%) since the 2013 census. There were 219 males and 213 females in 150 dwellings. 2.8% of people identified as LGBTIQ+. There were 111 people (25.5%) aged under 15 years, 63 (14.5%) aged 15 to 29, 219 (50.3%) aged 30 to 64, and 48 (11.0%) aged 65 or older.

People could identify as more than one ethnicity. The results were 86.2% European (Pākehā), 23.4% Māori, 2.1% Pasifika, 3.4% Asian, and 4.1% other, which includes people giving their ethnicity as "New Zealander". English was spoken by 98.6%, Māori by 2.8%, Samoan by 0.7%, and other languages by 5.5%. No language could be spoken by 0.7% (e.g. too young to talk). The percentage of people born overseas was 17.2, compared with 28.8% nationally.

Religious affiliations were 24.1% Christian, 0.7% New Age, and 0.7% other religions. People who answered that they had no religion were 62.1%, and 10.3% of people did not answer the census question.

Of those at least 15 years old, 69 (21.3%) people had a bachelor's or higher degree, 186 (57.4%) had a post-high school certificate or diploma, and 66 (20.4%) people exclusively held high school qualifications. 48 people (14.8%) earned over $100,000 compared to 12.1% nationally. The employment status of those at least 15 was 192 (59.3%) full-time, 57 (17.6%) part-time, and 9 (2.8%) unemployed.

== Marae ==
Hīona Marae, a meeting place of the Ngāti Maniapoto hapū of Pourahui, is affiliated with Waikato Tainui.

It has two meeting houses: Haona Kaha and Te Awananui.

In October 2020, the Government committed $2,584,751 from the Provincial Growth Fund to upgrade the marae and 5 other Waikato Tainui marae, creating 69 jobs.

== Education ==
Ngutunui School is a Year 1–8 co-educational state primary school with a roll of 39 as of July 2026. It opened in 1914.

The New Zealand Ministry for Culture and Heritage gives a translation of "big lips" for Ngutunui.
