= Hoana Riutoto =

Māori woman who signed the Treaty of Waitangi

Hoana Riutoto was a Māori woman from the Ngāti Mahuta sub-tribe (hapū) of the Kāwhia area of Waikato, New Zealand.

Hoana Riutoto signed the Treaty of Waitangi around March/April 1840, at the Waikato Heads. She was one of only a few Māori women to sign the treaty.

Hoana was an ancestor of Te Puea Herangi.
