= Ōtorohanga =

Town in Waikato, New Zealand

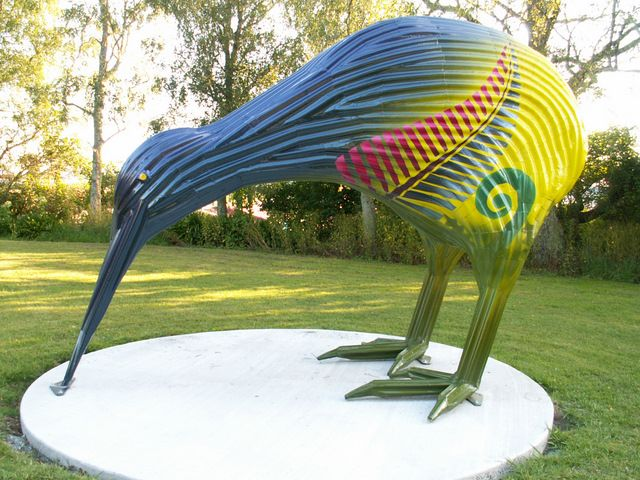
- Corrugated iron kiwi in Ōtorohanga
- Interactive map of Ōtorohanga
- Coordinates: 38°11′S 175°12′E
- Country: New Zealand
- Region: Waikato region
- District: Ōtorohanga District
- Ward: Ōtorohanga General Ward
- Community: Ōtorohanga Community

Government
  - Territorial authority: Ōtorohanga District Council
  - Regional council: Waikato Regional Council
  - Mayor of Ōtorohanga: Rodney Dow
  - Taranaki-King Country MP: Barbara Kuriger
  - Te Tai Hauāuru MP: Debbie Ngarewa-Packer

Area
  - Total: 5.07 km^{2} (1.96 sq mi)

Population (June 2025)
  - Total: 3,240
  - Density: 639/km^{2} (1,660/sq mi)
- Time zone: UTC+12 (NZST)
  - Summer (DST): UTC+13 (NZDT)
- Postcode: 3900
- Area code: 07

Ōtorohanga is a north King Country town in the Waikato region in the North Island of New Zealand. It is located 53 kilometres (33 mi) south of Hamilton and 18 kilometres (11 mi) north of Te Kūiti, on the Waipā River. It is a service town for the surrounding dairy-farming district. It is recognised as the "gateway" to the Waitomo Caves and as the "Kiwiana Town" of New Zealand. Ōtorohanga held a yearly 'Kiwiana Festival' until 2007.

== History ==
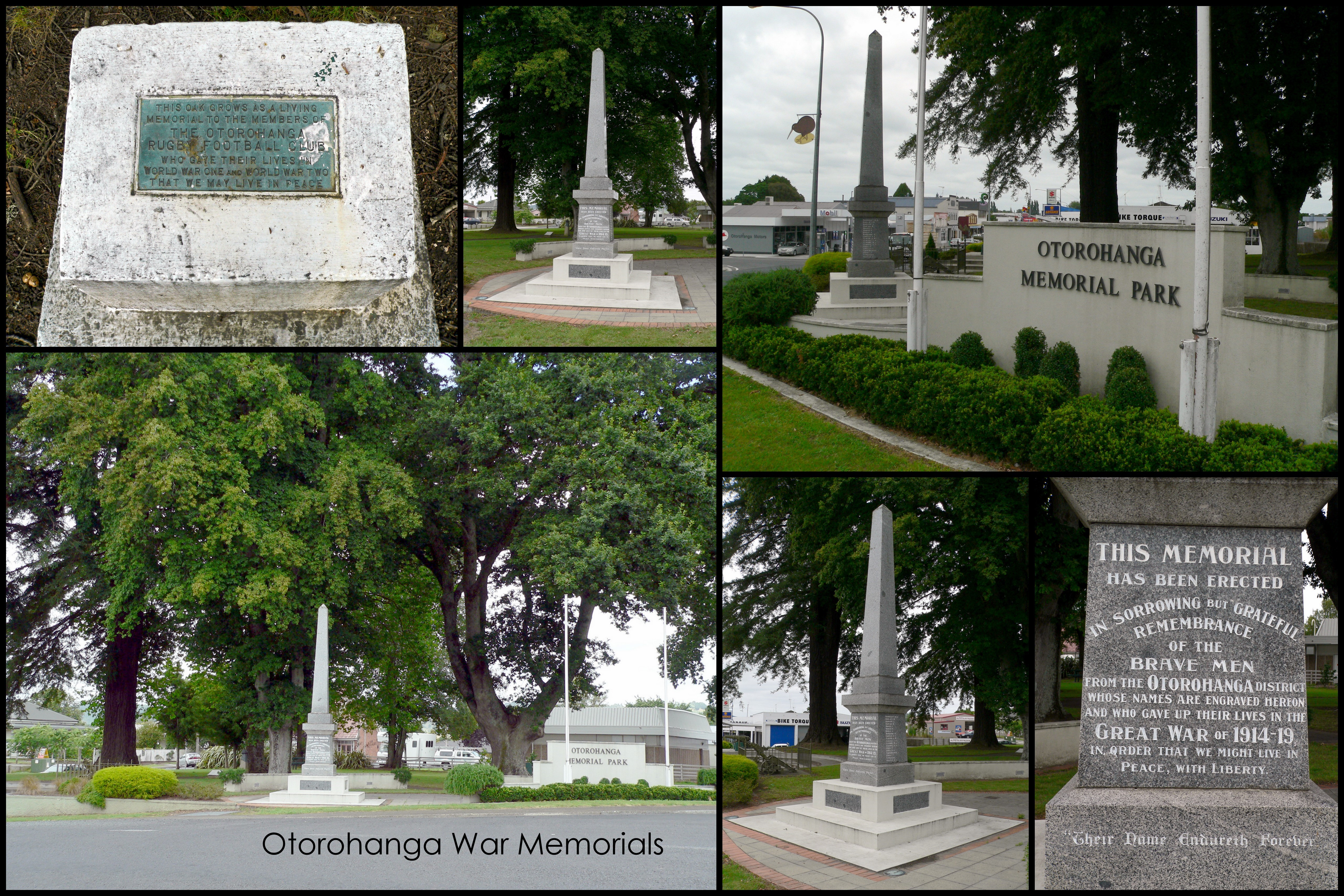
War memorials in Ōtorohanga

=== Early history ===
Until the 1860s Ōtorohanga was a Ngāti Maniapoto village, with several whare (houses), peach trees and a flour mill. Huipūtea is a 300-year-old kahikatea tree, just to the south east of Ōtorohanga, which was the site of a skirmish in 1822 between Ngāti Maniapoto and Ngāpuhi. The village was abandoned after the invasion of the Waikato, except for Lewis Hettit's (or Hetet) farm. The area remained insecure, with Hettit's store being robbed by Te Kooti in 1869, but a meeting with Donald McLean later that year signalled moves towards peace.

John William Ellis became postmaster and opened a store in 1885 with Henry Valder and John Taonui Hetet. In 1886 Ngāti Maniopoto built a court room for the Native Land Court and from that year mail was delivered 3 times a month and disputes which had delayed development were settled. On 9 March 1887 the railway was extended 14 mi (23 km) from Te Awamutu and a 14-room hotel was built, primarily for those attending the Court. The sawmill, later run by Ellis and Burnand, started in 1890 and closed in 1912.

=== Modern history ===
In the early 1900s many businesses were established by Māori, in particular John Ormsby (Hōne Ōmipi). The Otorohanga Times was formed in 1912; it merged with the King Country Chronicle to form the Waitomo News in 1980. McDonald’s began a limestone quarry south of Otorohanga in 1968, which was bought by Graymont in 2015.

Otorohanga’s population grew from 367 in 1916 to 1,569 in 1951, after which growth slowed. Although population dropped from 2,652 in 1991 and to 2,514 in 2013, the fall was much less than in the rest of King Country.

In 1986 and 1987 the Otorohanga Business Association and its members put up signs referring to the town as 'Harrodsville' and renamed their businesses to 'Harrods' in response to Harrods in Knightsbridge, London threatening legal action against New Zealand businesses of the same name.

=== Floods ===
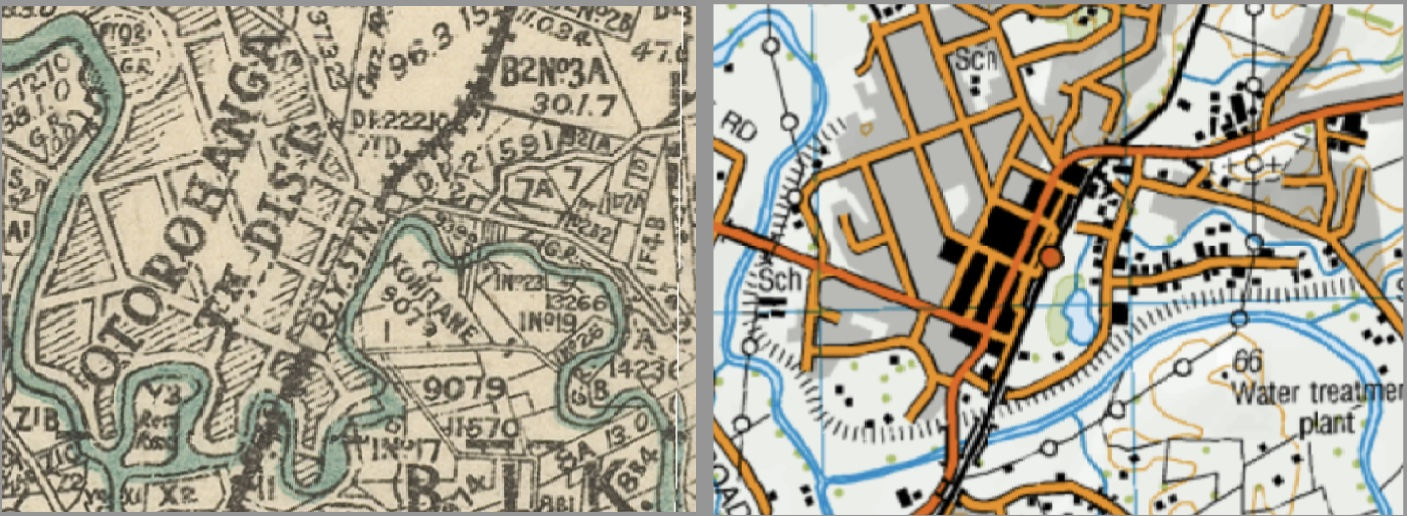
1934 and 2014 Ōtorohanga maps, showing the diversions of the Waipā. In 2004 the river flooded its old course.

Ōtorohanga is built on a flood plain of the Waipā River. Houses were flooded in 1893 1926 and 2026 and the whole town was flooded in 1907. It is now largely protected by stop banks built between 1961 and 1966, following a major flood in 1958. However, in 2004 Ōtorohanga Primary School on the outskirts of the town was flooded by about 0.6 m (2 ft 0 in) of water and children were temporarily transferred to the then recently closed Tihiroa Primary School, about 12 km (7.5 mi) north of Ōtorohanga on SH31.

== Local government ==
Ōtorohanga is part of the Ōtorohanga District, which stretches from Kawhia Harbour on the west coast inland to the Pureora Forest Park. The town is the largest in the District and the seat of Ōtorohanga District Council.

== Demographics ==
Stats NZ describes Ōtorohanga as a small urban area, which covers 5.07 km^{2} (1.96 sq mi). It had an estimated population of 3,240 as of June 2025, with a population density of 639 people per km^{2}.

Historical population
Year	Pop.	±% p.a.
2006	2,655	—
2013	2,625	−0.16%
2018	3,027	+2.89%
2023	3,180	+0.99%

Ōtorohanga had a population of 3,180 in the 2023 New Zealand census, an increase of 153 people (5.1%) since the 2018 census, and an increase of 555 people (21.1%) since the 2013 census. There were 1,560 males, 1,617 females, and 6 people of other genders in 1,179 dwellings. 2.2% of people identified as LGBTIQ+. The median age was 36.8 years (compared with 38.1 years nationally). There were 681 people (21.4%) aged under 15 years, 636 (20.0%) aged 15 to 29, 1,233 (38.8%) aged 30 to 64, and 630 (19.8%) aged 65 or older.

People could identify as more than one ethnicity. The results were 64.4% European (Pākehā); 45.5% Māori; 3.9% Pasifika; 5.9% Asian; 0.6% Middle Eastern, Latin American and African New Zealanders (MELAA); and 1.6% other, which includes people giving their ethnicity as "New Zealander". English was spoken by 96.2%, Māori by 12.0%, Samoan by 0.1%, and other languages by 5.7%. No language could be spoken by 2.7% (e.g. too young to talk). New Zealand Sign Language was known by 0.6%. The percentage of people born overseas was 11.2, compared with 28.8% nationally.

Religious affiliations were 26.8% Christian, 1.4% Hindu, 0.1% Islam, 3.9% Māori religious beliefs, 0.5% Buddhist, 0.3% New Age, and 1.5% other religions. People who answered that they had no religion were 58.2%, and 7.5% of people did not answer the census question.

Of those at least 15 years old, 258 (10.3%) people had a bachelor's or higher degree, 1,440 (57.6%) had a post-high school certificate or diploma, and 804 (32.2%) people exclusively held high school qualifications. The median income was $34,900, compared with $41,500 nationally. 129 people (5.2%) earned over $100,000 compared to 12.1% nationally. The employment status of those at least 15 was 1,200 (48.0%) full-time, 336 (13.4%) part-time, and 102 (4.1%) unemployed.

== Marae ==
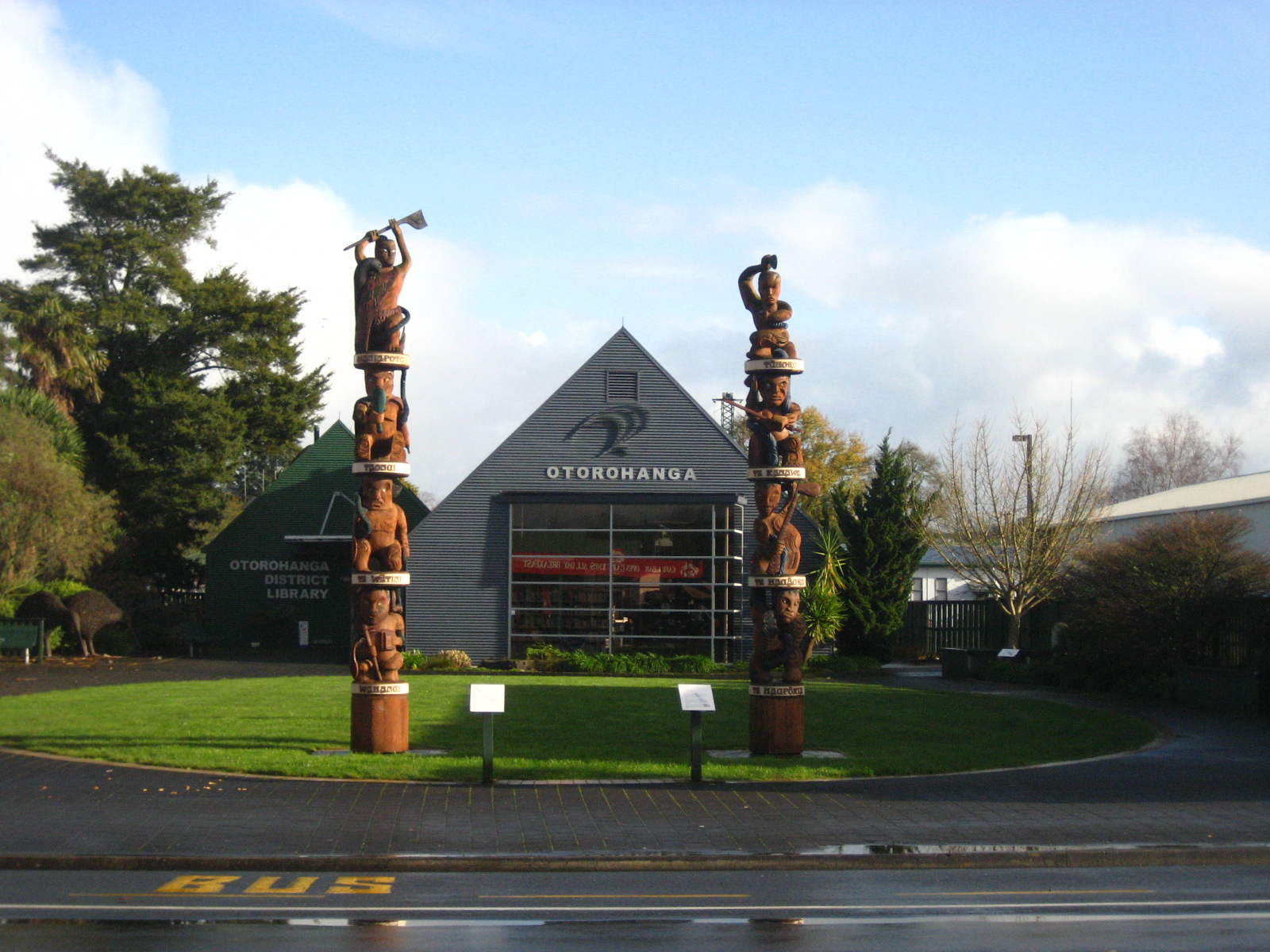
Ōtorohanga district library

Six marae are located in and around Ōtorohanga:

- Kahotea Marae and Whatihua meeting house is a meeting place for the Ngāti Maniapoto hapū of Apakura, Hinetū, Ngāti Matakore and Pare te Kawa, and the Waikato Tainui hapū of Apakura.
- Rereamanu Marae and Te Kawau Kaki Maro meeting house is a meeting place for the Maniapoto hapū of Huiao and Te Kanawa.
- Tārewānga Marae and Te Rau a te Moa meeting house is a meeting place for the Maniapoto hapū of Pare te Kawa, Rungaterangi, Urunumia and Tārewānga.
- Te Keeti Marae and Parewaeono meeting house is a meeting place of the Maniapoto hapū of Ngutu, Parewaeono and Urunumia.
- Te Kotahitanga Marae and Te Kotahitanga meeting house is a meeting place for the Maniapoto hapū of Pourahi and Urunumia.
- Turitea Marae and Turitea meeting house is a meeting place for the Maniapoto hapū of Pourahui.

== Attractions ==
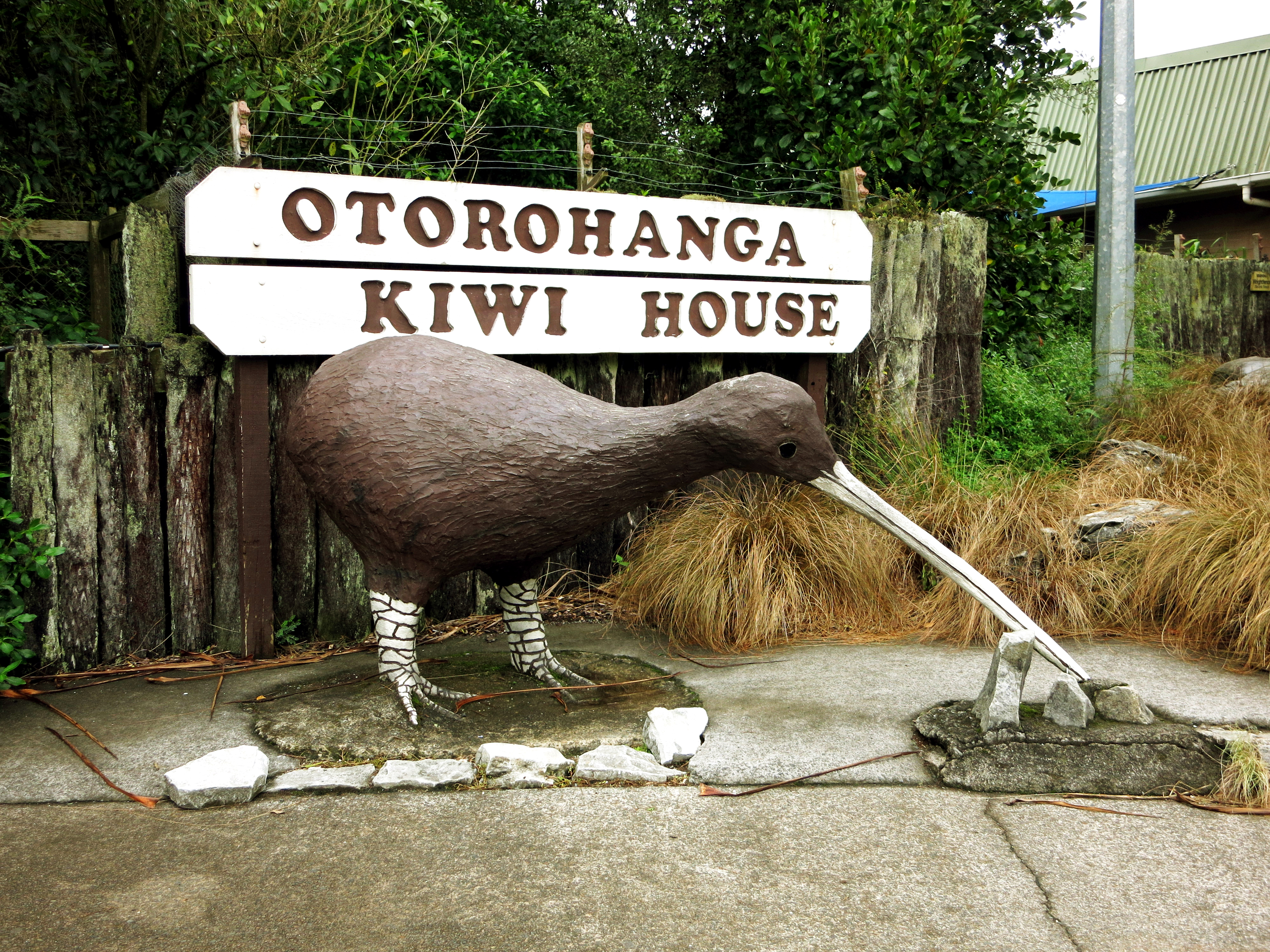
Front of Otorohanga Kiwi House

Ōtorohanga is internationally renowned for its Kiwi House, which was the first place in the world where the general public could view kiwi in captivity, and recorded an average of 5,000 visitors per month in 2008. The town has a public library, a swimming complex, a supermarket and a 24-hour McDonald's restaurant.

== Transport ==
Ōtorohanga is on the North Island Main Trunk railway line. Otorohanga railway station opened in 1887. The Northern Explorer passenger train stops in Ōtorohanga on its service between Auckland and Wellington.

== Education ==
Ōtorohanga School is a Year 1–8 state primary school. It is a decile 2 school with a roll of 113. The first school in Ōtorohanga opened in 1893.

Ōtorohanga South School is a Year 1–8 state primary school. It is a decile 4 school with a roll of 308.

St Mary's Catholic School is a Year 1–8 state integrated Catholic primary school. It is a decile 5 school with a roll of 26. It opened in 1955 and moved to its current site in 1985.

Ōtorohanga College is a Year 9–13 state secondary school and community education centre. It is a decile 4 school with a roll of 370.

All these schools are co-educational. Rolls are as of July 2026.
