= Kawhia Harbour =

Harbour and settlement in Waikato, New Zealand

Kawhia
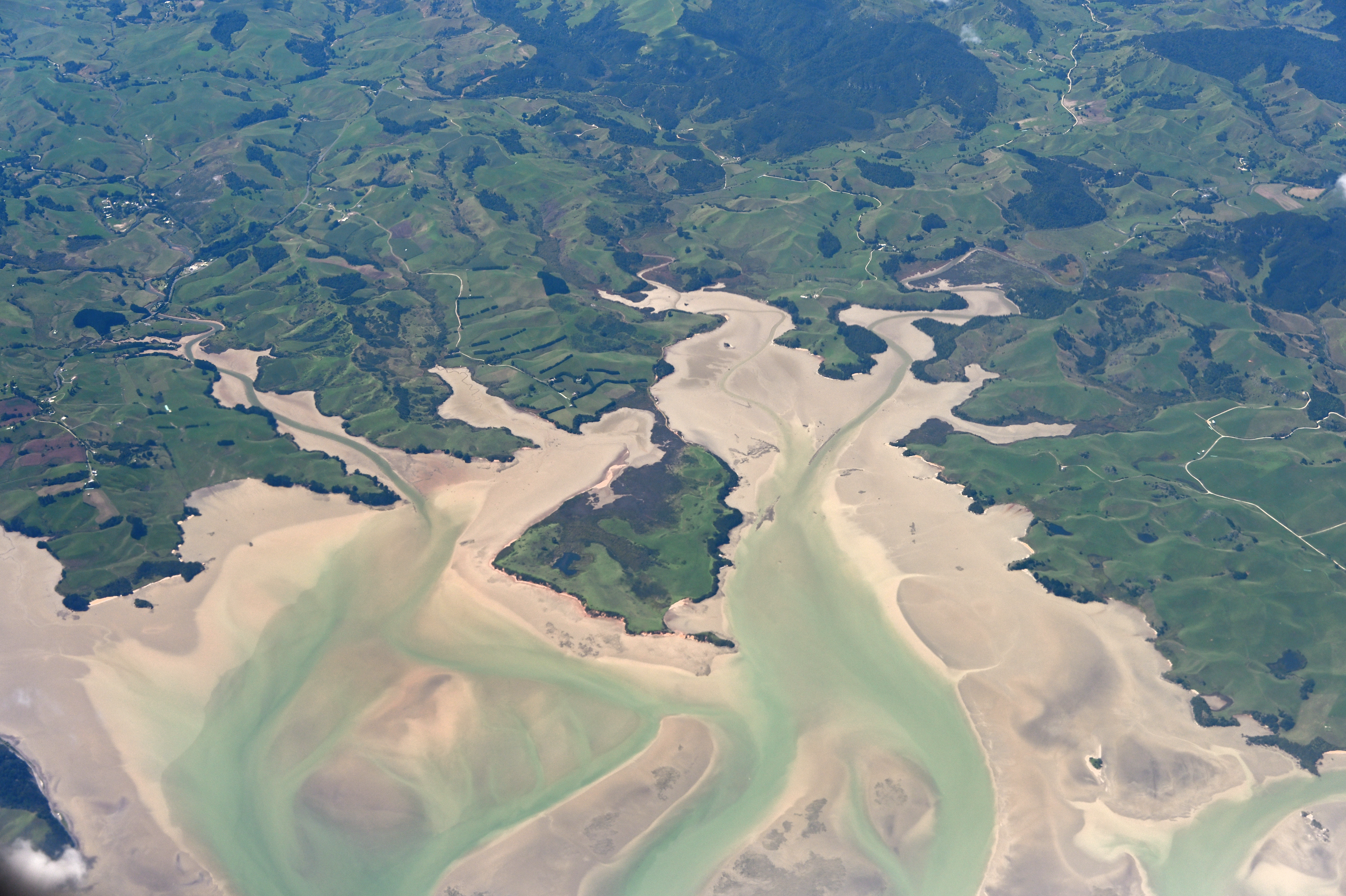
- The harbour with Tiritirimatangi Peninsula at centre
- Interactive map of Kawhia
- Coordinates: 38°6′S 174°48′E
- Country: New Zealand
- Region: Waikato Region
- District: Ōtorohanga District
- Ward: Kāwhia-Tihiroa General Ward
- Community: Kāwhia Community
- Electorates: Taranaki-King Country; Hauraki-Waikato (Māori)

Government
  - Territorial Authority: Ōtorohanga District Council
  - Regional council: Waikato Regional Council
  - Mayor of Ōtorohanga: Rodney Dow
  - Taranaki-King Country MP: Barbara Kuriger
  - Hauraki-Waikato MP: Hana-Rawhiti Maipi-Clarke

Area
  - Total: 0.93 km^{2} (0.36 sq mi)

Population (June 2025)
  - Total: 370
  - Density: 400/km^{2} (1,000/sq mi)
- Time zone: UTC+12 (NZST)
  - Summer (DST): UTC+13 (NZDT)
- Postcode: 2451
- Area code: 07

Kawhia Harbour (Māori: Kāwhia) is one of three large natural inlets in the Tasman Sea coast of the Waikato region of New Zealand's North Island. It is located to the south of Raglan Harbour, Ruapuke and Aotea Harbour, 40 kilometres southwest of Hamilton. Kawhia is part of the Ōtorohanga District and is in the King Country. It has a high-tide area of 68 km^{2} (26 mi^{2}) and a low-tide area of 18 km^{2} (6.9 mi^{2}). Te Motu Island is located in the harbour.

The settlement of Kawhia is located on the northern coast of the inlet, and was an important port in early colonial New Zealand. The area of Kawhia comprises 16 to 20 hectares (40 to 50 acres) and is the town block that was owned by the New Zealand Government. The government bought it from the Europeans in 1880 "not from the original Māori owners, but from a European who claimed ownership in payment of money owed by another European".

== History and culture ==
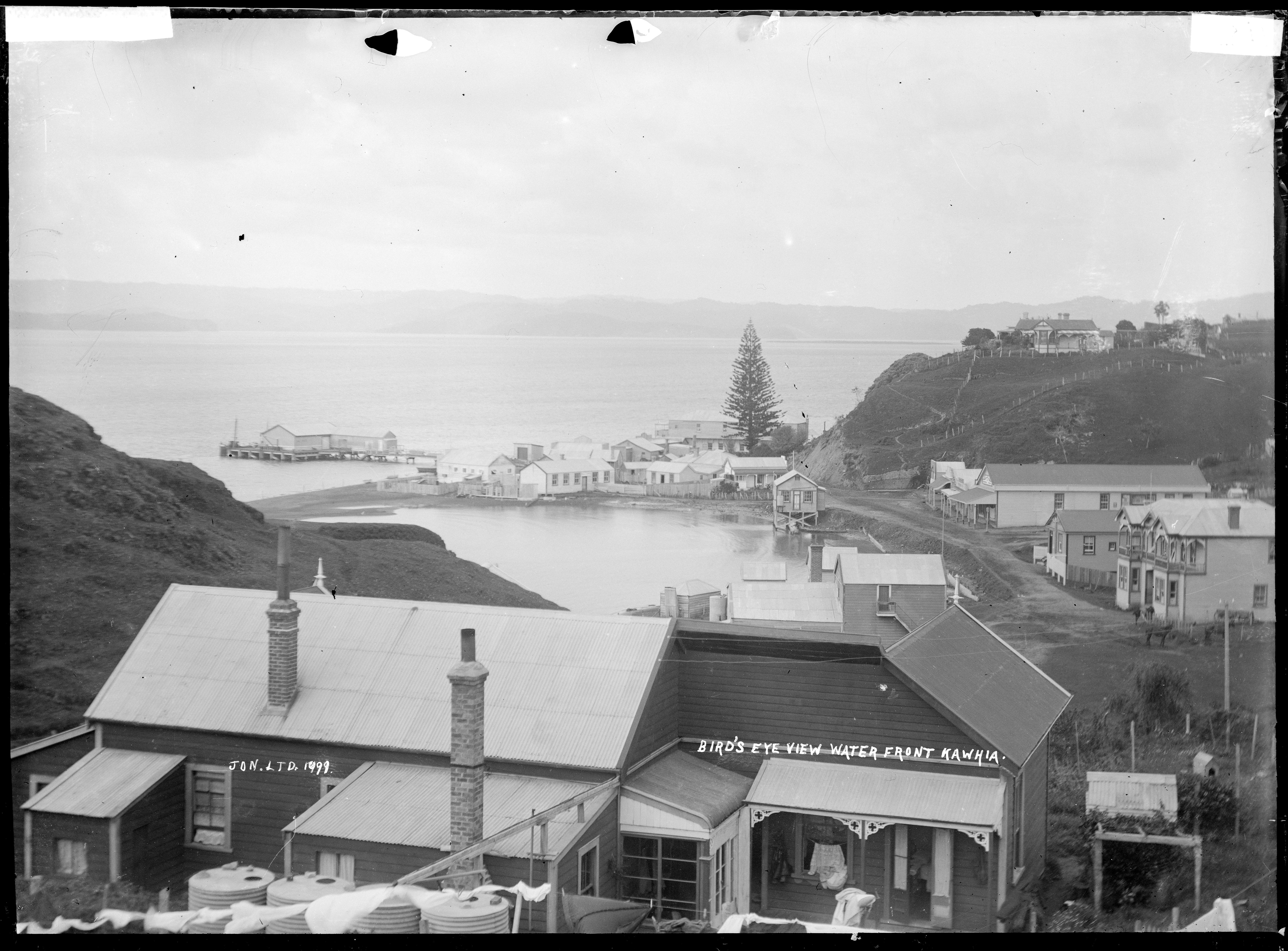
Waterfront at Kawhia pictured between 1908 and 1915. St Elmo boarding house in the foreground.

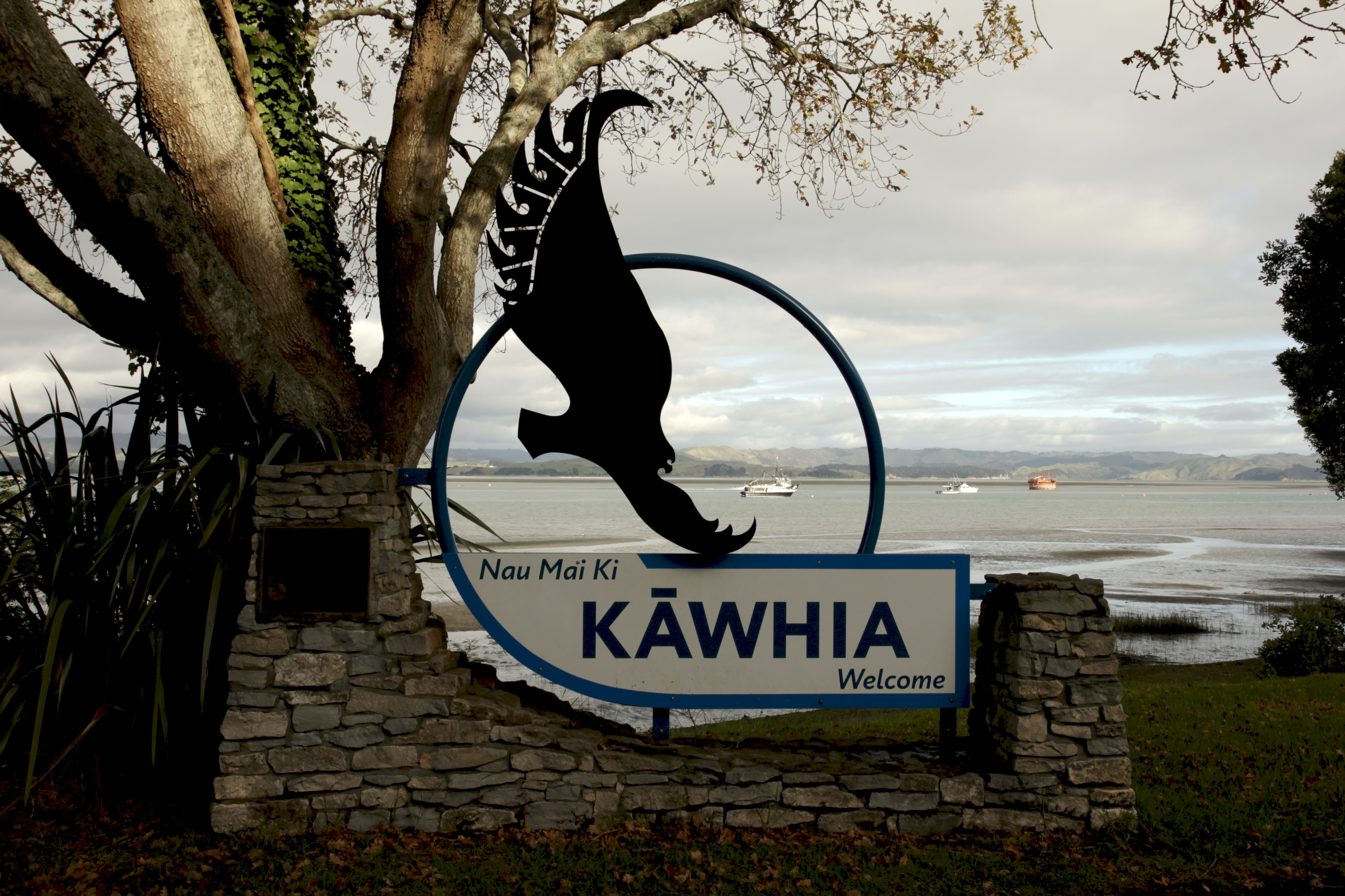
"Welcome to Kawhia" sign

=== Early history ===
Kawhia Harbour is the southernmost location where kauri trees historically grew.

Kawhia is known in Māori lore as the final resting-place of the ancestral waka (canoe) Tainui. Soon after arrival, captain Hoturoa made it first priority to establish a whare wananga (sacred school of learning) which was named Ahurei. Ahurei is situated at the summit of the sacred hill behind Kawhia’s seaside marae – Maketu Marae. The harbour area was the birthplace of the prominent Māori warrior chief Te Rauparaha of the Ngāti Toa tribe, who lived in the area until the 1820s, when he, and his tribe along with Ngāti Rārua and Ngāti Koata migrated southwards.

Tainui was buried at the base of Ahurei by Hoturoa himself, and other members of the iwi. Hoturoa marked out the waka with two limestone pillars, which he blessed. Firstly, there is "Hani (Hani-a-te-waewae-i-kimi-atu) which is on the higher ground and marked the prow of the canoe". Marking the stern of the canoe, Hoturoa placed the symbol of Puna, the spirit-goddess of that creation story. "In full it is named Puna-whakatupu-tangata, and represents female fertility, the spring or source of humanity."

=== Marae ===
Maketu Marae is located next to Kawhia Harbour. The main meeting house of the marae, Auau ki te Rangi, is named after Hoturoa’s father, who was a high chief (ariki) and was built and opened in 1962.

The eldest and most prestigious meeting house that was first built on Maketu Marae is Te Ruruhi (the Old Lady) which was used as the dining hall until 1986. It was replaced by a two-storey dining hall, Te Tini O Tainui, to cater for the large numbers that visit for occasions such as annual poukai, tangi and hui. The marae is affiliated to Waikato through the hapū of Ngāti Mahuta, with connections to Ngāti Apakura, Ngāti Hikairo, and Ngāti Te Wehi.

Six other marae are also based at or near Kawhia Harbour:

- Mōkai Kainga Marae and Ko Te Mōkai meeting house is a meeting place for the Ngāti Maniapoto hapū of Apakura and Hikairo, and the Waikato Tainui hapū of Apakura.
- Mokoroa Marae and Ngā Roimata meeting house is a meeting place for the Waikato hapū of Ngati Kiriwai.
- Ōkapu or Oakapu Marae and Te Kotahitanga o Ngāti Te Wehi meeting house is a meeting place for the Waikato hapū of Ngāti Mahuta and Ngāti Te Wehi.
- Te Māhoe Marae is a meeting ground for the Ngāti Maniapoto hapū of Peehi, Te Kanawa, Te Urupare and Uekaha.
- Waipapa Marae and Ngā Tai Whakarongorua and Takuhiahia meeting houses are a meeting place for the Ngāti Maniapoto hapū of Hikairo, and the Waikato Tainui hapū of Ngāti Hikairo and Ngāti Puhiawe.
- Rākaunui Marae and Moana Kahakore meeting house is on Ngati Tamainu (Waikato) land, the hapu of which are Ngāti Te Kiriwai, Ngati Huiarangi, Ngati Te Kanawa, and Ngati Mahuta). It also affiliates to Ngāti Ngutu, Ngāti Paretekawa of Maniapoto, and Ngāti Apakura.

In October 2020, the Government committed $196,684 from the Provincial Growth Fund to upgrade Ōkapu Marae, creating 16 jobs.

=== European history ===
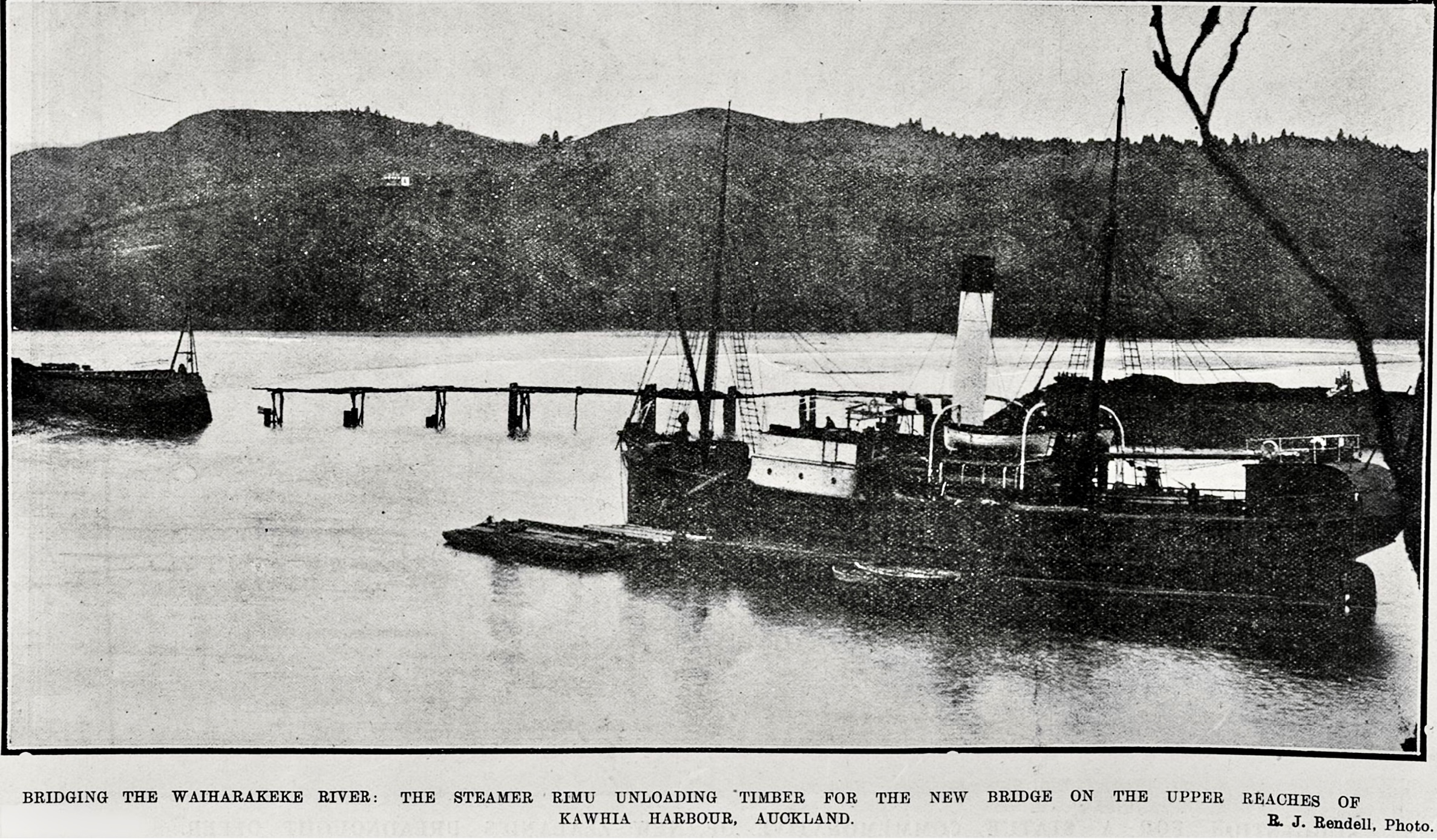
265 ft (81 m) long Waiharakeke bridge, where Harbour Rd crosses an arm of the harbour, opened in 1909

The Kawhia Harbour area was important to the kauri gum trade of the late 19th/early 20th centuries, as it was the southernmost area where the gum could be found.

The Kawhia Settler and Raglan Advertiser was established in May 1901 by William Murray Thompson and Thomas Elliott Wilson, who also ran the Bruce Herald, Waimate Times, Egmont Settler (later briefly part of Taranaki Central Press at Stratford) and the Mangaweka Settler. From 1909 Edward Henry Schnackenberg, whose father was a missionary here from 1858 to 1864, owned the paper, until it closed in April 1936.

In January 2018, the health board issued a statement that there was no additional risk from tuberculosis in Kawhia after reports of three possible cases.

== Demographics ==
Statistics New Zealand describes Kāwhia as a rural settlement, which covers 0.93 km^{2} (0.36 sq mi). It had an estimated population of 370 as of June 2025, with a population density of 398 people per km^{2}. The settlement is part of the larger Pirongia Forest statistical area.

Historical population for Kawhia
| Year | Pop. | ±% p.a. |
|---|---|---|
| 2006 | 390 | — |
| 2013 | 336 | −2.11% |
| 2018 | 384 | +2.71% |
| 2023 | 378 | −0.31% |

Kāwhia had a population of 378 in the 2023 New Zealand census, a decrease of 6 people (−1.6%) since the 2018 census, and an increase of 42 people (12.5%) since the 2013 census. There were 186 males and 192 females in 168 dwellings. 1.6% of people identified as LGBTIQ+. The median age was 57.8 years (compared with 38.1 years nationally). There were 48 people (12.7%) aged under 15 years, 36 (9.5%) aged 15 to 29, 168 (44.4%) aged 30 to 64, and 126 (33.3%) aged 65 or older.

People could identify as more than one ethnicity. The results were 58.7% European (Pākehā), 55.6% Māori, 6.3% Pasifika, 1.6% Asian, and 1.6% other, which includes people giving their ethnicity as "New Zealander". English was spoken by 96.8%, Māori by 19.0%, Samoan by 0.8%, and other languages by 2.4%. No language could be spoken by 2.4% (e.g. too young to talk). New Zealand Sign Language was known by 1.6%. The percentage of people born overseas was 9.5, compared with 28.8% nationally.

Religious affiliations were 28.6% Christian, 0.8% Hindu, 3.2% Māori religious beliefs, 0.8% New Age, 0.8% Jewish, and 0.8% other religions. People who answered that they had no religion were 57.9%, and 8.7% of people did not answer the census question.

Of those at least 15 years old, 42 (12.7%) people had a bachelor's or higher degree, 180 (54.5%) had a post-high school certificate or diploma, and 114 (34.5%) people exclusively held high school qualifications. The median income was $27,000, compared with $41,500 nationally. 21 people (6.4%) earned over $100,000 compared to 12.1% nationally. The employment status of those at least 15 was 102 (30.9%) full-time, 42 (12.7%) part-time, and 15 (4.5%) unemployed.

Before 2018, Kawhia was in its own statistical area

| Year | Population | Households | Median age | Median income | National median |
|---|---|---|---|---|---|
| 2001 | 507 | 198 | 44.1 | $12,100 | $18,500 |
| 2006 | 390 | 171 | 49.2 | $15,100 | $24,100 |
| 2013 | 339 | 153 | 53.8 | $19,200 | $27,900 |
| 2018 | 384 | 162 | – | – | $31,800 |
| 2023 | 378 | 168 | 57.8 | $27,000 | $41,500 |

In 2013 231 dwellings were unoccupied. In the much wider Pirongia Forest area, 396 dwellings were unoccupied in 2018, when it was estimated that 70% of Kawhia's houses were holiday homes.

As of 2017, New Zealand's median centre of population is located around one kilometre off the coast of Kawhia.

=== Pirongia Forest statistical area ===
Pirongia Forest statistical area, which also includes Hauturu, covers 490.80 km^{2} (189.50 sq mi). It had an estimated population of 1,000 as of June 2025, with a population density of 2.0 people per km^{2}.

Historical population for Pirongia Forest
| Year | Pop. | ±% p.a. |
|---|---|---|
| 2006 | 897 | — |
| 2013 | 828 | −1.14% |
| 2018 | 966 | +3.13% |
| 2023 | 984 | +0.37% |

Pirongia Forest had a population of 984 in the 2023 New Zealand census, an increase of 18 people (1.9%) since the 2018 census, and an increase of 156 people (18.8%) since the 2013 census. There were 489 males and 495 females in 429 dwellings. 1.5% of people identified as LGBTIQ+. The median age was 53.0 years (compared with 38.1 years nationally). There were 150 people (15.2%) aged under 15 years, 108 (11.0%) aged 15 to 29, 450 (45.7%) aged 30 to 64, and 279 (28.4%) aged 65 or older.

People could identify as more than one ethnicity. The results were 63.1% European (Pākehā), 49.4% Māori, 4.0% Pasifika, 1.8% Asian, and 2.7% other, which includes people giving their ethnicity as "New Zealander". English was spoken by 97.9%, Māori by 13.1%, Samoan by 0.6%, and other languages by 2.7%. No language could be spoken by 1.5% (e.g. too young to talk). New Zealand Sign Language was known by 0.6%. The percentage of people born overseas was 8.8, compared with 28.8% nationally.

Religious affiliations were 26.5% Christian, 0.3% Hindu, 3.7% Māori religious beliefs, 0.3% Buddhist, 0.3% New Age, 0.3% Jewish, and 0.6% other religions. People who answered that they had no religion were 61.0%, and 7.6% of people did not answer the census question.

Of those at least 15 years old, 108 (12.9%) people had a bachelor's or higher degree, 447 (53.6%) had a post-high school certificate or diploma, and 270 (32.4%) people exclusively held high school qualifications. The median income was $27,300, compared with $41,500 nationally. 45 people (5.4%) earned over $100,000 compared to 12.1% nationally. The employment status of those at least 15 was 312 (37.4%) full-time, 117 (14.0%) part-time, and 30 (3.6%) unemployed.

== Te Puia Hot Springs ==
2 hours either side of low tide (for tide times, see tide-forecast.com) about 100 m off the Tasman Sea beach, 4 km from Kawhia (see 1:50,000 map), oozes hot water, which can be formed into shallow bathing pools with a spade.

A council sample taken on 30 March 2006 listed these in the water.

| Site | pH | Li | Na | K | Ca | Mg | Rb | Cl | SO_{4} | B | SiO_{2} | NH_{4} | HCO_{3} | S Total | F | Fe | ^{18}O_{VSMOW} | d^{2}H_{VSMOW} | Br |
|---|---|---|---|---|---|---|---|---|---|---|---|---|---|---|---|---|---|---|---|
| Te Puia | 7.9 | 9.21.71 | 3870 | 121 | 2150 | 107 | 0.094 | 9540 | 724 | 7.5 | 34.3 | 2.17 | 25 | 0.712 | 0.62 | 0.1 | -2.66 | -21.7 | 29.6 |

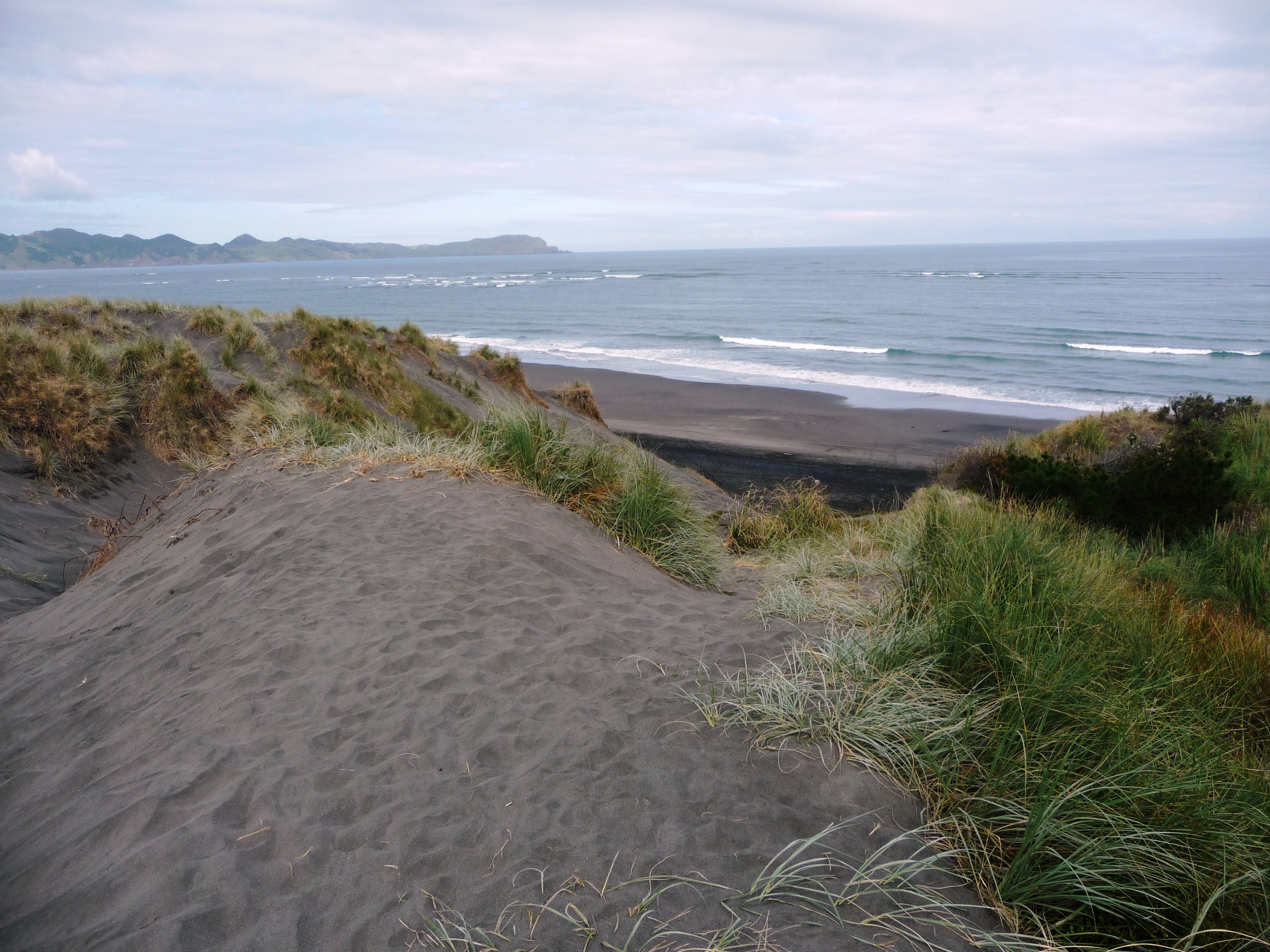
Te Puia Springs are on the beach to the right from this track across the dunes.

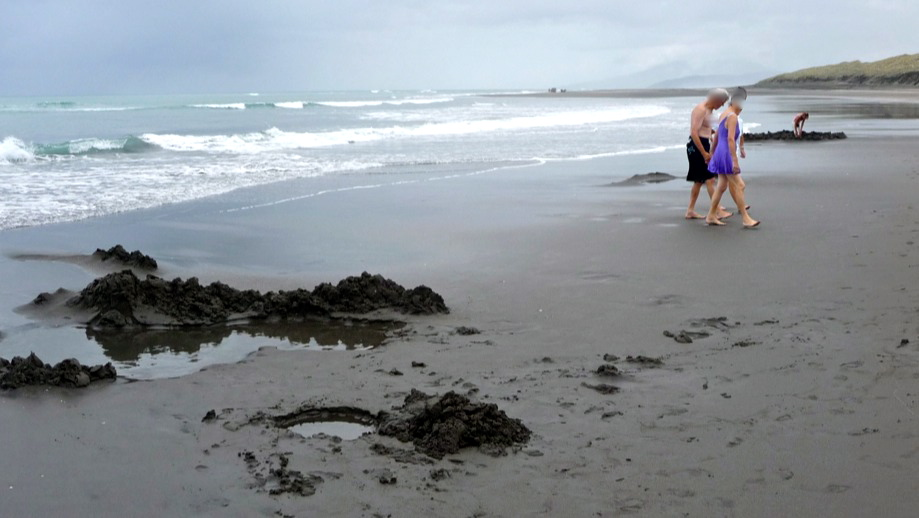
about 100 metres of beach oozes hot water, which is uncovered for about 4 hours at spring low tides, but not at neap tides.

== Kawhia County Council ==
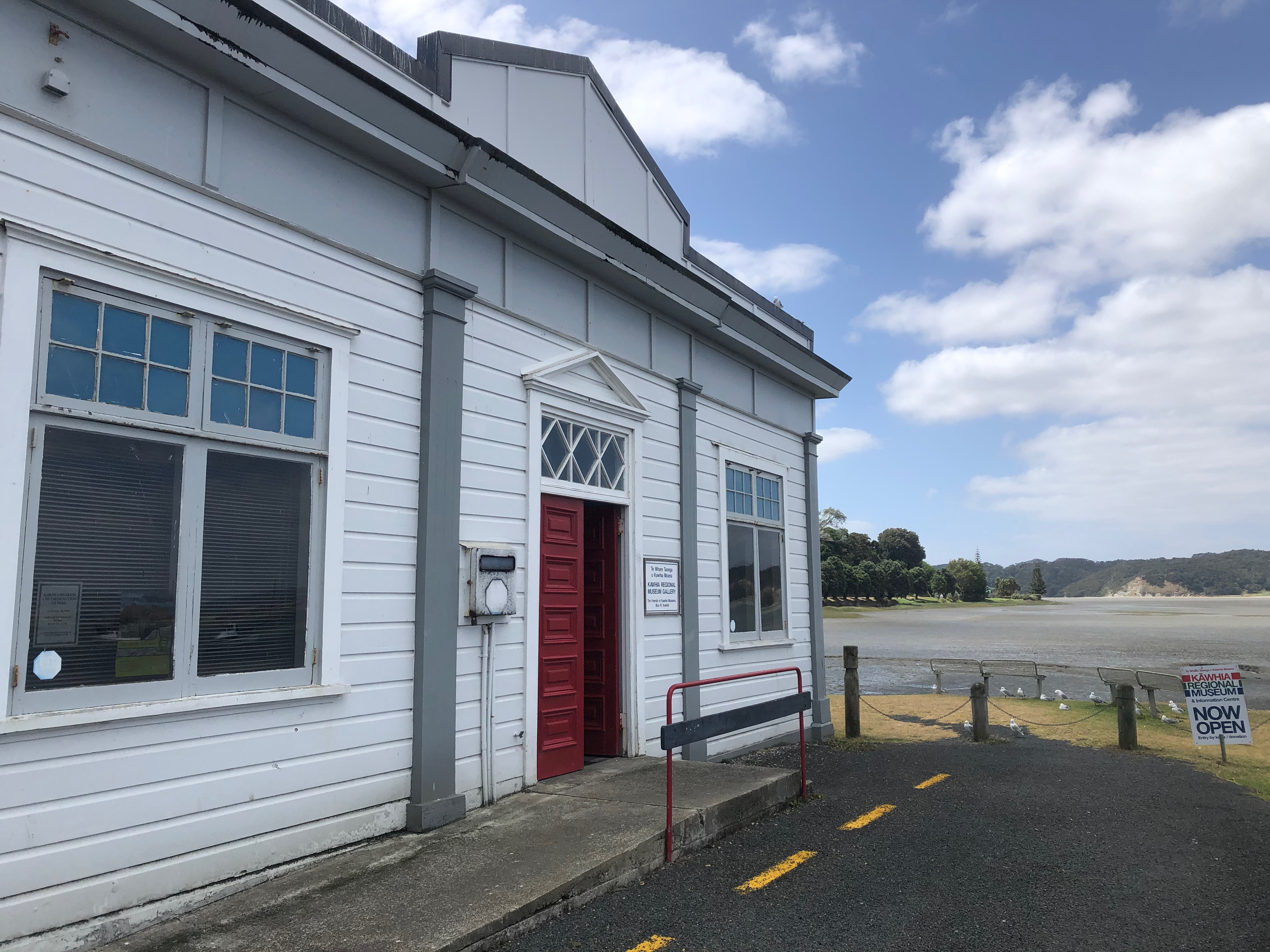
Former Kawhia County Council office in 2020, now Kāwhia Museum

Kawhia County Council was formed in 1905 and first met on 12 July 1905. New offices were built by Buchanan Bros in 1915-16 over the former beach, and designed by Hamilton architects and engineers, Warren and Blechynden. In 1923, Kawhia County covered 330 mi^{2} (850 km^{2}) and had a population of 1,098, with 52 mi (84 km) of gravel roads, 95 mi (153 km) of mud roads and 125 mi (201 km) of tracks. Kawhia Town Board was formed in 1906, with an area of 470 acres (190 ha). Its population in 1923 was 195, when it had 6 mi 14 ch (9.9 km) of streets and a 10 acres (4.0 ha) domain. The County merged into Ōtorohanga and Waitomo in 1956, after a Local Government Commission inquiry.

== Kāwhia Community Board ==
The Community Board meets monthly and consists of 4 members, plus the Kāwhia - Tihiroa Ward councillor. Three members are elected from the Kawhia area and one from Aotea.

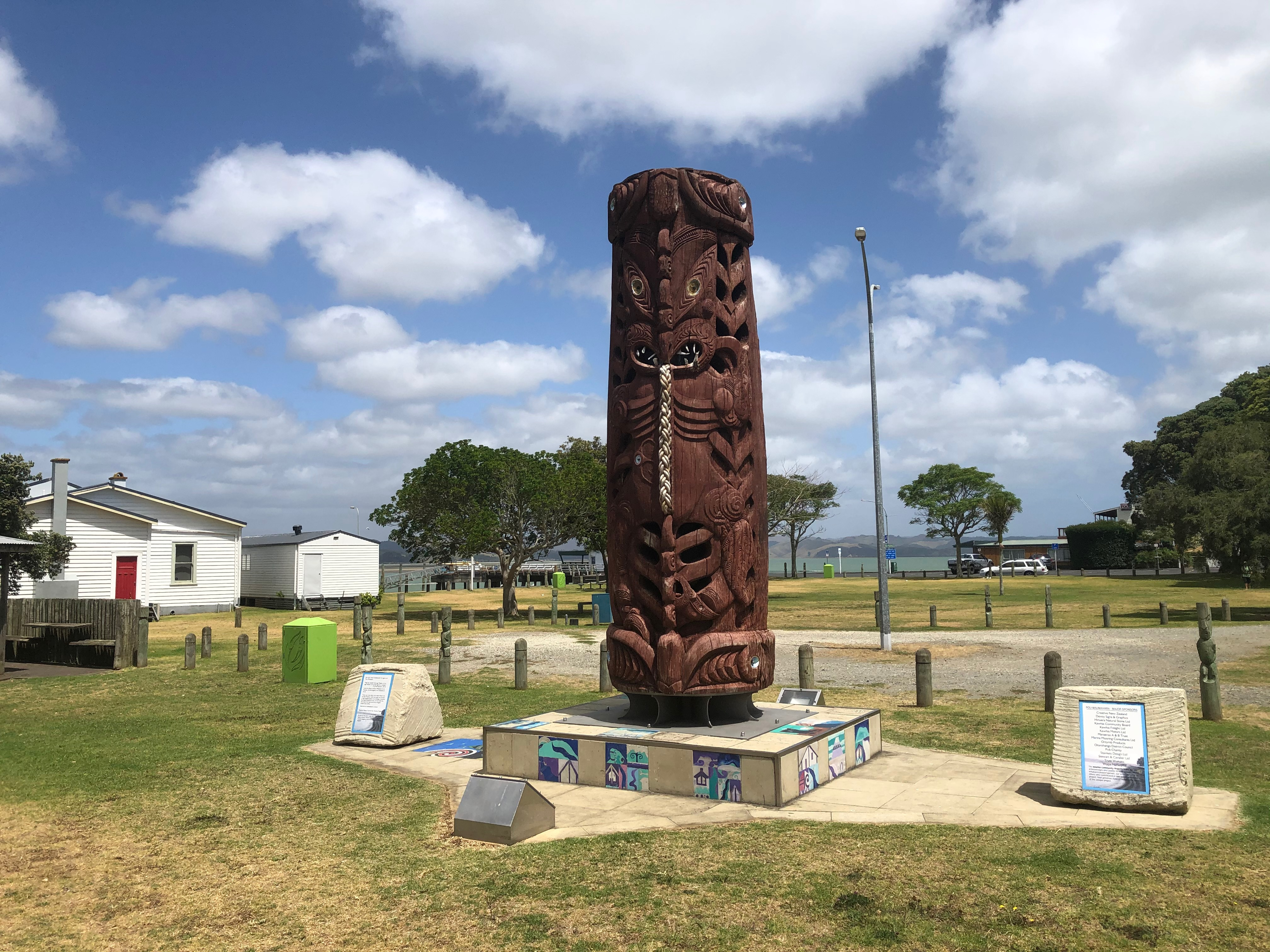
Pou Maumahara unveiled in 2016

== Pou Maumahara ==
In 2016, a 5 m (16 ft) tall pou maumahara (remembrance pillar) was put up at Omimiti Reserve, behind the museum. Te Kuiti Stewart began carving it in 2014, from a Pureora Forest totara. It represents 150 years of Kīngitanga on one side and the Elizabeth Henrietta's 1824 arrival, on the other. At night it is floodlit, with coloured LED lights inside.

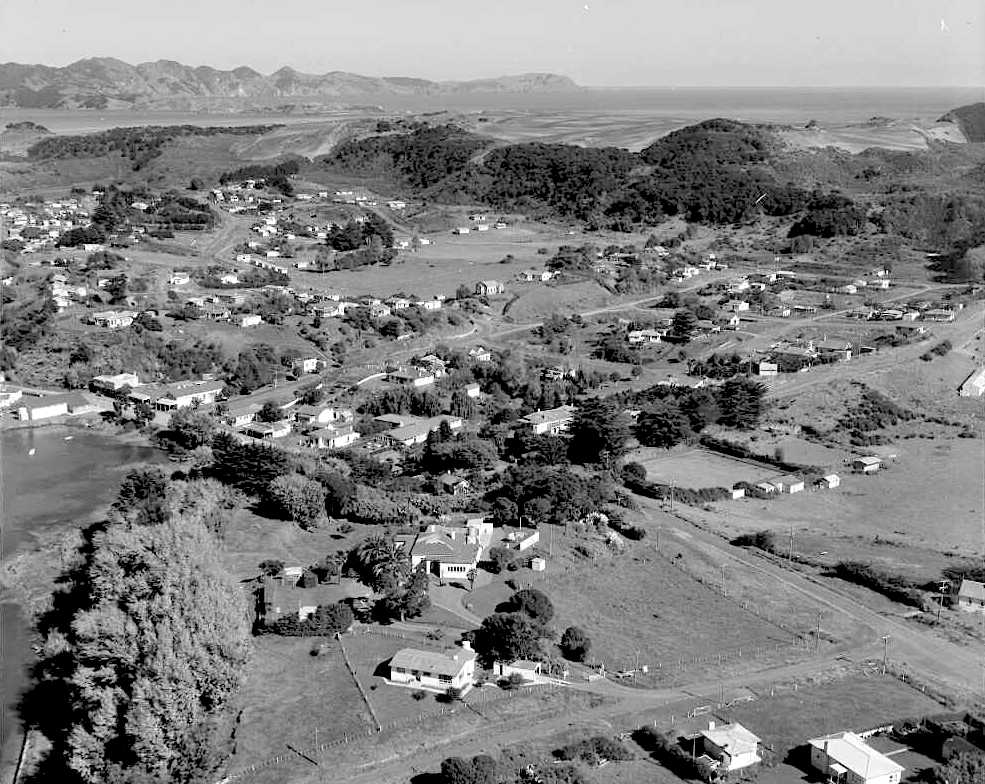
Kawhia hospital in 1963, with Te Maika and Albatross Point in the distance and the Methodist Church near the centre

== Hospital ==
Kawhia hospital overlooked the town, on the site of Te Puru pa, which became the Armed Constabulary redoubt in 1863. Like the County Office, the hospital was also designed by Warren and Blechynden and opened in 1918. It was still a cottage hospital in 1948, but had become a maternity hospital by 1959 and closed in March 1967.

== Education ==
Kāwhia School is a Year 1–8 co-educational state primary school. It is a decile 1 school with a roll of 54 as of July 2026.

A Kawhia School was established in 1845. In 1863, the school was described as 'mixed' (racially). It was taught by Annie Allen and supervised by her future husband, Cort Schnackenberg. The school, by then called Kawhia Native School, closed in 1904 in favour of the public school at Te Maika on the southern head of Kawhia Harbour. The current Kāwhia School moved to its present site in 1922.

== Notable people ==
- Te Rangihaeata, chief, born about 1780
- John Kent, European trader, 1820s–1830s
- John Whiteley, Cort and Annie Jane Schnackenberg, missionaries
- Hoana Riutoto, signatory of Treaty of Waitangi
- Jim Rukutai, rugby player, born about 1877
- Mary Reidy, sister at Kawhia Hospital 1921–1947
- Carole Shepheard (born 1945), artist

== See also ==
- SH31
- Kairuku waewaeroa, extinct giant penguin
