= Ōtorohanga District =

- Territorial authority district
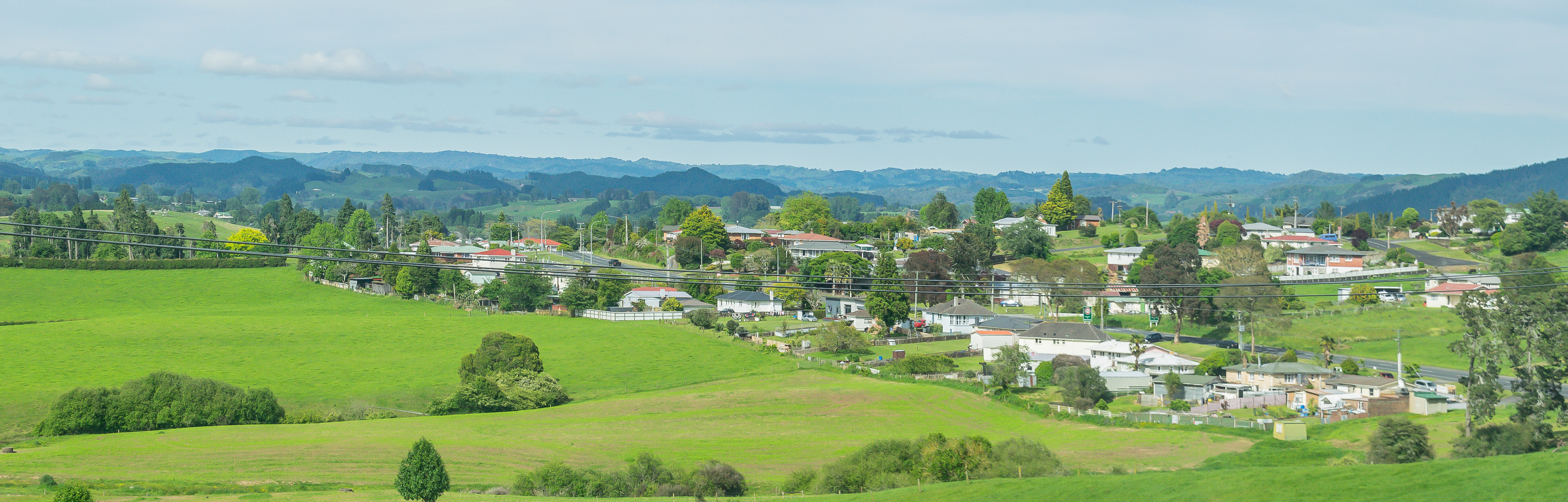
- View of Ōtorohanga

- Ōtorohanga district within the North Island
- Coordinates: 38°15′S 175°20′E
- Country: New Zealand
- Region: Waikato
- Wards: Kāwhia-Tihiroa; Waipā; Wharepuhunga; Kiokio-Korakonui; Ōtorohanga; Rangiātea (Māori)
- Formed: 1979
- Seat: Ōtorohanga

Government
  - Mayor: Rodney Dow
  - Territorial authority: Ōtorohanga District Council

Area
  - Land: 1,999.19 km^{2} (771.89 sq mi)

Population (June 2025)
  - Total: 10,700
  - Density: 5.35/km^{2} (13.9/sq mi)
- Time zone: UTC+12 (NZST)
  - Summer (DST): UTC+13 (NZDT)
- Postcode(s): Map of postcodes
- Website: Ōtorohanga District

Ōtorohanga District is a territorial authority in the King Country area and Waikato region of the North Island of New Zealand. It is a mostly rural area, with Ōtorohanga town being by far the biggest urban area, with a population nearing 3,000. The District was called Otorohanga County from 1971 to 1979.

== Geography ==
Ōtorohanga District is located south of Hamilton, west of Rotorua, and northwest of Taupō. It stretches from Kawhia Harbour on the west coast inland to the Pureora Forest Park. Adjacent local government districts are (clockwise from the north) Waikato, Waipā, South Waikato, Taupō, and Waitomo. The district has a land area of 1,999.18 square kilometres (771.89 sq mi). It is a mostly rural area, with significant areas of native forest.

== History ==
After the land wars, the wider area of the King Country was a refuge for Tāwhiao, the second Māori King, and his followers. From 1864 to 1883, Pākehā (European settlers) were not allowed into the area unless they had express permission. The district was used for farming from the late 19th century onwards.

The first municipal government, Otorohanga County, was formed in 1922. In 1956, the northern part of Kawhia County and Otorohanga County were amalgamated. On 1 November 1971, Otorohanga Borough was subsumed into Otorohanga County. The Otorohanga District was declared in 1979 by renaming Otorohanga County. It was reconstituted as part of the 1989 local government reforms, with a nearly identical area.

== Governance ==
The seat of Ōtorohanga District Council is in the town of Ōtorohanga. The council is headed by a mayor, and complemented by seven councillors from five wards. The council wards are Kawhia/Tihiroa (two councillors), Waipa, Wharepuhunga, Kiokio/ Korakonui, and Ōtorohanga (two councillors). Rodney Dow has been the mayor since the 2025 local elections.

The District is entirely within the wider Waikato Regional Council area.

== Demographics ==
The district's population in June 2025 was 10,700. The town of Ōtorohanga, located at about the centre of the district, is the largest town, with a population of 3,240. Other communities include Hauturu, Honikiwi, Kawhia, Maihiihi, Oparau, Ōtewā, Owhiro, Puketotara, Te Kawa and Wharepuhunga.

The district covers 1,999.19 km^{2} (771.89 sq mi) and had a population density of 5.4 people per km^{2} in June 2025.

Historical population
Year	Pop.	±% p.a.
2006	9,075	—
2013	9,141	+0.10%
2018	10,104	+2.02%
2023	10,410	+0.60%

Ōtorohanga District had a population of 10,410 in the 2023 New Zealand census, an increase of 306 people (3.0%) since the 2018 census, and an increase of 1,269 people (13.9%) since the 2013 census. There were 5,499 males, 4,893 females and 21 people of other genders in 3,699 dwellings. 2.0% of people identified as LGBTIQ+. The median age was 38.3 years (compared with 38.1 years nationally). There were 2,223 people (21.4%) aged under 15 years, 1,740 (16.7%) aged 15 to 29, 4,683 (45.0%) aged 30 to 64, and 1,764 (16.9%) aged 65 or older.

People could identify as more than one ethnicity. The results were 76.3% European (Pākehā); 32.5% Māori; 3.2% Pasifika; 4.4% Asian; 0.6% Middle Eastern, Latin American and African New Zealanders (MELAA); and 2.8% other, which includes people giving their ethnicity as "New Zealander". English was spoken by 96.9%, Māori language by 7.7%, Samoan by 0.3% and other languages by 5.1%. No language could be spoken by 2.2% (e.g. too young to talk). New Zealand Sign Language was known by 0.5%. The percentage of people born overseas was 11.5, compared with 28.8% nationally.

Religious affiliations were 26.8% Christian, 0.7% Hindu, 0.1% Islam, 2.5% Māori religious beliefs, 0.3% Buddhist, 0.3% New Age, 0.1% Jewish, and 1.5% other religions. People who answered that they had no religion were 60.0%, and 7.8% of people did not answer the census question.

Of those at least 15 years old, 810 (9.9%) people had a bachelor's or higher degree, 4,776 (58.3%) had a post-high school certificate or diploma, and 2,364 (28.9%) people exclusively held high school qualifications. The median income was $38,000, compared with $41,500 nationally. 645 people (7.9%) earned over $100,000 compared to 12.1% nationally. The employment status of those at least 15 was that 4,230 (51.7%) people were employed full-time, 1,155 (14.1%) were part-time, and 234 (2.9%) were unemployed.

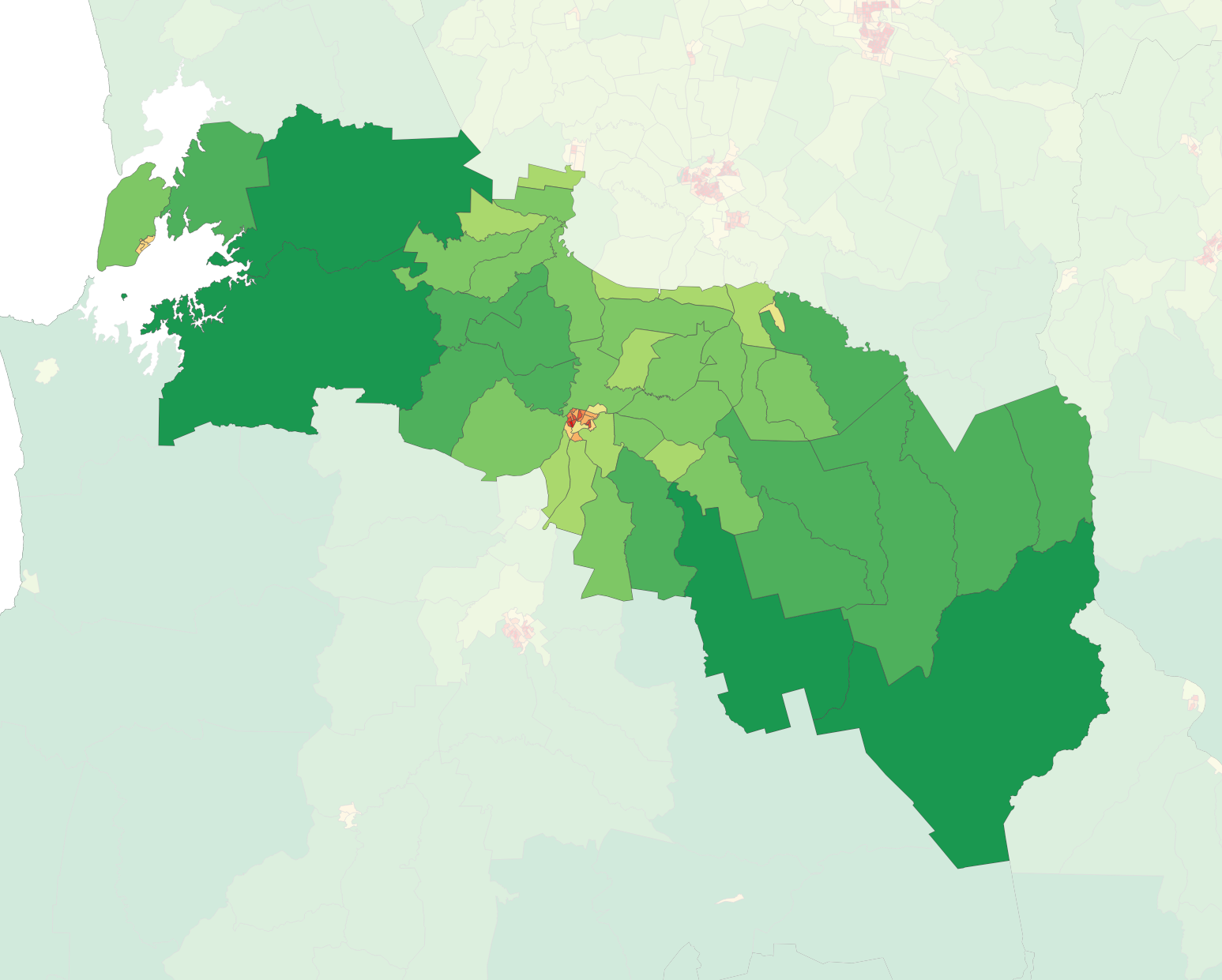
Population density in the 2023 census

Individual wards
Name	Area (km^{2})	Population	Density (per km^{2})	Dwellings	Median age	Median income
Kāwhia-Tihiroa General Ward	791.22	3,099	3.9	1,179	42.1 years	$38,100
Waipā General Ward	468.57	1,365	2.9	495	36.2 years	$46,300
Kio Kio-Korakonui General Ward	163.41	1,410	8.6	489	36.1 years	$48,100
Ōtorohanga General Ward	5.07	3,180	627.2	1,179	36.8 years	$34,900
Wharepuhunga General Ward	570.91	1,359	2.4	357	38.7 years	$24,800
New Zealand					38.1 years	$41,500
