= Kepa Hamuera Anaha Ehau =

Kepa Hamuera Anaha Ehau (5 November 1885 – 10 February 1970) was a New Zealand tribal leader, law clerk, interpreter, soldier, historian, orator. He was born on November 5, 1885.
