= Ōtorohanga District Council =

Territorial authority of New Zealand

Coordinates: 38.1854487°S 175.2098358°E

Ōtorohanga District Council Te Kaunihera ā-Rohe o Ōtorohanga

Type
- Type: Unicameral of Ōtorohanga District
- Houses: Governing Body
- Term limits: None

History
- Founded: 6 March 1989

Leadership
- Mayor: Rodney Dow
- Deputy mayor: Katrina Christison
- CEO: Tanya Winter

Structure
- Seats: 10 (1 mayor, 9 councillors)
- Political groups: Independent (10)
- Length of term: 3 years

Elections
- Last election: 2025
- Next election: 2028

Website
- otodc.govt.nz

Ōtorohanga District Council (Māori: Te Kaunihera ā-Rohe o Ōtorohanga) is the territorial authority for the Ōtorohanga District of New Zealand's North Island. It serves as the district's local government, with the Waikato Regional Council serving as the regional authority. It has existed since 1979, surviving in a re-constituted form through the 1989 reforms to local government.

The council has 9 councillors and is chaired by the mayor of Ōtorohanga (currently Rodney Dow since October 2025).

In 2026 6,421 were registered to vote in the District.

== Composition ==
The council currently consists of a mayor elected at-large and 9 councillors, elected from six wards. Two councillors are returned from Rangiātea Māori ward, which covers the entire district, two from Kāwhia-Tihiroa general ward, two from Ōtorohanga general ward, one from Waipā general ward, one from Kio Kio-Korakonui general ward, and one from Wharepūhunga general ward.

=== Current council ===
The present council was elected in the 2025 local elections:

Ōtorohanga District Council, 2025–2028
Position	Name	Ward	Affiliation
Mayor	Rodney Dow	At-large	Independent
Deputy mayor	Katrina Christison	Ōtorohanga	Independent
Councillor	Tayla Barclay	Ōtorohanga	Independent
Councillor	Andrew Barker	Kio Kio-Korakonui	Independent
Councillor	Jo Butcher	Kāwhia-Tihiroa	Independent
Councillor	Kit Jeffries	Kāwhia-Tihiroa	Independent
Councillor	Shane Carr	Wharepūhunga	Independent
Councillor	Tennille Kete	Rangiātea	Independent
Councillor	Jaimee Tamaki	Rangiātea	Independent
Councillor	Michael Woodward	Waipā	Independent

=== Community boards ===
Ōtorohanga District Council currently has two community boards:

- Ōtorohanga Community Board: Leanna Massey, Brendon McNeil, Craig Thomas, Bronwyn Tubman
- Kāwhia Community Board: Geoff Good, Richard Harpur, Annie Mahara, Hinga Whiu

== History ==
The council was established in 1989. It replaced a council of the same name established in 1976, which replaced the Otorohanga County Council established in 1922.

== Elections ==
- 1980
- 1983
- 1986
- 1989
- 1992
- 1995
- 1998
- 2001
- 2004
- 2007
- 2010
- 2013
- 2016
- 2019
- 2022
- 2025
