= Mayor of Ōtorohanga =

- Incumbent; Rodney Dow since 2025
- Style: His/Her Worship
- Term length: Three years, renewable
- Formation: 1976, 1989
- Salary: $104,465
- Website: Official website

The mayor of Ōtorohanga officiates over the Ōtorohanga District Council. The county of Otorohanga was established in 1971, becoming a district council in 1979.

Rodney Dow is the current mayor of Ōtorohanga. He was elected in 2025.

== List of mayors ==
| Mayor | Portrait | Term of office |
|---|---|---|
| Eric Tait | | 1995–2004 |
| Dale Williams | | 2004–2013 |
| Max Baxter | | 2013–2025 |
| Rodney Dow | | 2025–present |
