= Road signs in New Zealand =

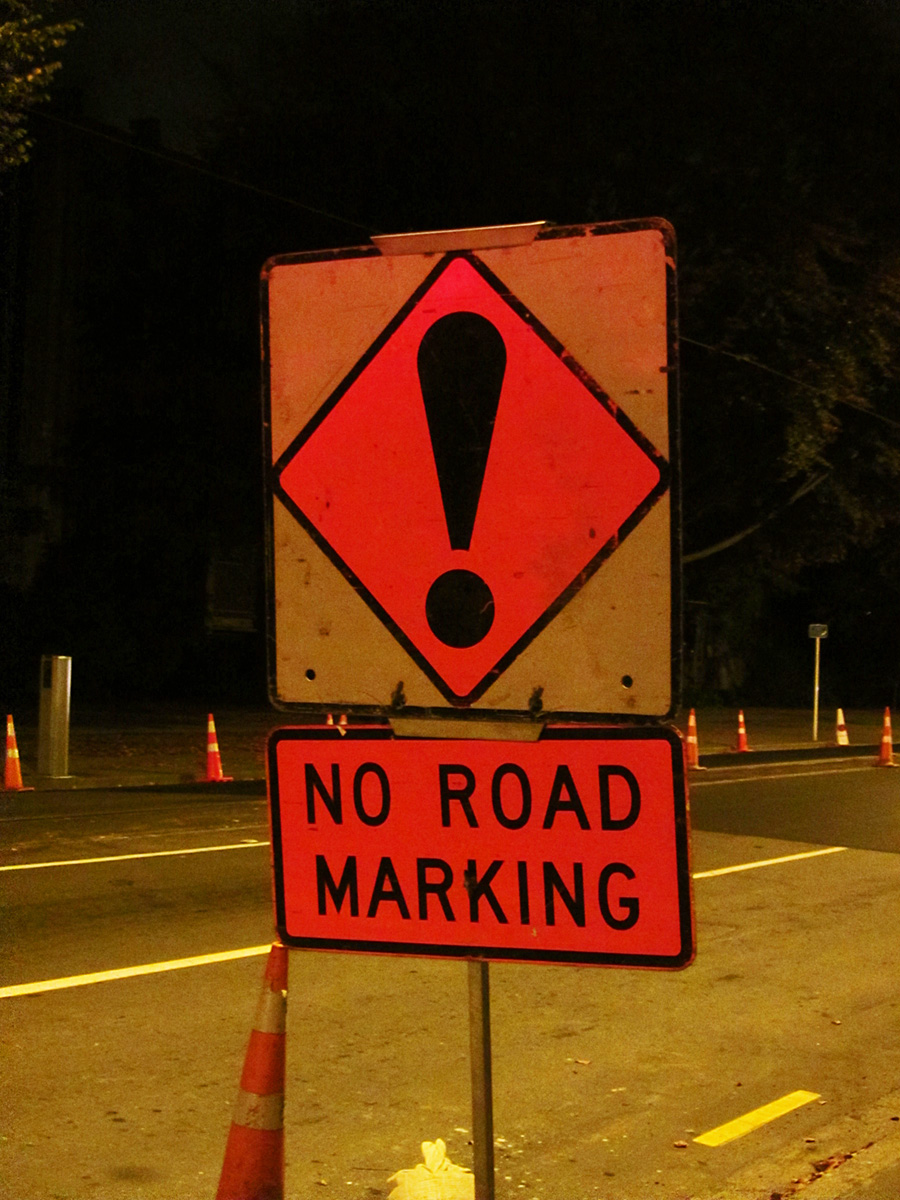
Some traffic signs

Road signs in New Zealand are similar to those set by the Vienna Convention on Road Signs and Signals. While New Zealand is not a signatory to the convention, its road signs are generally close in shape and function. New Zealand uses yellow diamond-shaped signs for warnings in common with Australia, the Americas, Ireland, Japan and Thailand. Speed limit signs are a red circle with a white background and the limitation in black, and are in kilometres per hour. There are also some signs unique to New Zealand. Road signs in New Zealand are controlled by NZ Transport Agency Waka Kotahi and are prescribed in the Land Transport Rule: Traffic Control Devices 2004 and set out in the Traffic Control Devices (TCD) Manual.

Most of these signs were only introduced between 1987 and 1990, replacing older-style signs with white text on black backgrounds: square with a red border for regulatory signs and diamond with a yellow border. Warning signs and the Give Way sign were replaced from 1987, regulatory signs from 1989, and parking signs from 1990. The only signs that remained the same were the Stop sign and the speed limit sign (although the "km/h" legend from metrication was removed). Some of the older signs can still be seen on some rural roads. New Zealand drives on the left.

Speed limits are posted in multiples of 10 kilometres per hour [km/h] (6.2 mph), and range from 10–110 km/h (6–68 mph), with 110 km/h being the maximum legal speed for motor vehicles in New Zealand. The Manual of Traffic Signs and Markings specifies that advisory speeds (PW-25) always end in digit "5"; however, there are some advisory speed signs that do not comply with the manual and end in zero.

In 2023, the then Labour government made moves to have bilingual road signs with English and Māori. One poll found 48% of the New Zealand public supported the idea, with 44% opposing. Another poll found 32% were in support and opposition was at 45%.

== Regulatory signs ==
10 km/h speed limit

20 km/h speed limit

30 km/h speed limit

40 km/h speed limit

50 km/h speed limit

60 km/h speed limit

70 km/h speed limit

80 km/h speed limit

90 km/h speed limit

100 km/h speed limit

110 km/h speed limit

Temporary 10 km/h speed limit

Temporary 20 km/h speed limit

Temporary 30 km/h speed limit

Temporary 40 km/h speed limit

Temporary 50 km/h speed limit

Temporary 60 km/h speed limit

Temporary 70 km/h speed limit

Temporary 80 km/h speed limit

Speed limit derestricted (no posted speed limit, maximum of 100 km/h applies but drive to conditions)

Speed limit at times prescribed on school days

School speed limit

Beach speed limits

Riverbed speed limits

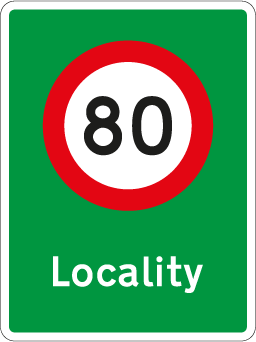
Locality speed limit

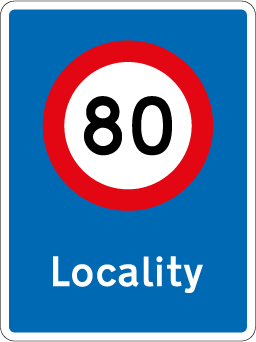
Locality speed limit

Stop

Give Way

Give Way (fluorescent version)

Straight ahead traffic give way

Right turning traffic give way

Left turning traffic give way

Give way to cyclists

Give way to cyclists and pedestrians

Give Way at Roundabout (give way to vehicles coming from the right)

Give Way at Roundabout (fluorescent version)

School Patrol Stop (used by crossing wardens when children are crossing the street, vehicles must stop)

Perforated version

Stop on Red Signal (used at traffic lights)

Stop Here on Red Signal (used at traffic lights)

Give Way to Oncoming Vehicles

Priority Over Oncoming Vehicles

Turning Traffic Give Way To Pedestrians

Turning Traffic Give Way To Cyclists

Straight Ahead Traffic Give Way To Cyclists

One Vehicle per Green each lane (used underneath ramp meters on motorway on-ramps)

No Left Turn

No Right Turn

No U-turn

No Entry

No entry except buses

No entry except cycles

No entry except authorised vehicles

Road Closed

Wrong Way

Wrong Way - Go Back

Turn Left

Proceed Straight Ahead (no turns allowed)

Turn Right

Turn Left or Right

One-way traffic (pointing left)

One-way traffic (pointing right)

Keep Left

Keep Left (narrow version)

Keep Right

Keep Right (narrow version)

School Street

This Lane Must Turn Left

This Lane Must Turn Right

This Lane Must Proceed Straight

This Lane May Proceed Straight or Turn Left

This Lane May Proceed Straight or Turn Right

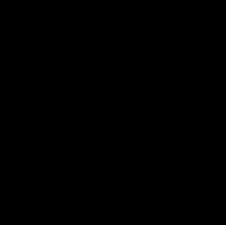
Traffic may use the Below Lane - National Speed Limit applies (Used on motorways where variable speed limits usually apply, but are inactive at the time.)

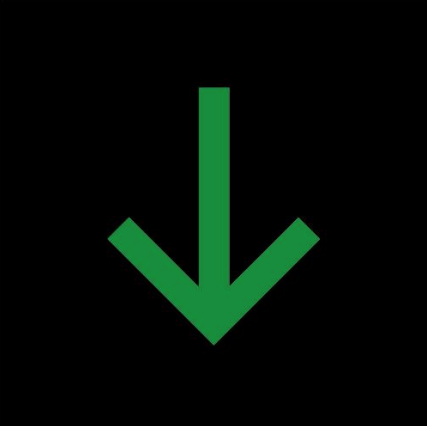
Traffic may use the Below Lane (Variable sign used when Dynamic Lanes are in use, and in some motorway tunnels.)

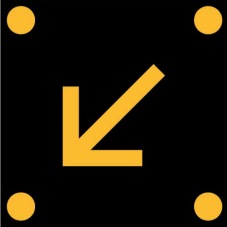
Lane Closure Ahead - Traffic merge left (Used on motorways where variable lane control is used.)

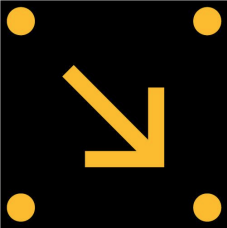
Lane Closure Ahead - Traffic merge right (Used on motorways where variable lane control is used.)

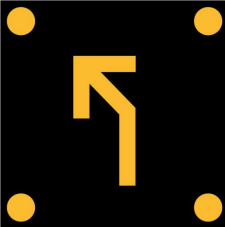
Only traffic using the next exit may use the below lane (Used on motorways where variable lane control is used.)

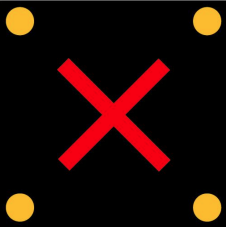
Lane Closed - Traffic May Not use the Below Lane (Used on where variable lane control or Dynamic Lanes are used.)

Bus Lane

Buses Only

Transit Lane ends

Transit Lane ends

Cycle Lane

Cycles Only

Heavy Vehicle/Truck Lane

Shared Cycle and Pedestrian Path

Cyclists and Pedestrians Maintain Sides

Cyclists and Pedestrians Maintain Sides

Emergency Stopping Lane Only

Emergency Stopping Lane Only during times specified

Emergency Stopping Lane

Signal bypass transit lane for vehicles carrying 2 or more persons and heavy vehicles exceeding 3500 kilograms

Signal bypass transit lane for vehicles carrying 3 or more persons and heavy vehicles exceeding 3500 kilograms

Signal bypass transit lane for vehicles carrying 2 or more persons and heavy vehicles exceeding 3500 kilograms

Signal bypass transit lane for vehicles carrying 3 or more persons and heavy vehicles exceeding 3500 kilograms

Do not Stop for Signals

Signals do not apply

Signals do not apply

Bus and Electric Vehicle Lane

Buses and Electric Vehicles Only

Transit lane for vehicles carrying 2 or more persons and electric vehicles irrespective of the number of persons in the vehicle

Transit lane for vehicles carrying 3 or more persons and electric vehicles irrespective of the number of persons in the vehicle

Transit lane for vehicles carrying 2 or more persons, heavy vehicles exceeding 3500 kilograms and electric vehicles irrespective of the number of persons in the vehicle

Transit lane for vehicles carrying 3 or more persons, heavy vehicles exceeding 3500 kilograms and electric vehicles irrespective of the number of persons in the vehicle

Cycles or Mopeds are prohibited

No Pedestrians

No Heavy Vehicles/Trucks

Maximum Height Restriction

Pedestrians Only (marks a pedestrian zone where motor vehicles are prohibited)

Cycles Must Exit

Class C road (Heavy vehicles can drive on this road only to deliver or collect goods or passengers along the road)

Class I road

Class I road until date specified

Maximum Length for Heavy Vehicles

Heavy vehicle axle weight limit

No cruising zone

No cruising zone begins

No cruising zone ends

Keep Left Unless Passing

Use Left Lane Unless Passing

Regulatory sign effective ahead

Regulatory sign effective begins

Regulatory sign effective ends

Regulatory sign effective in 100 metres

Regulatory sign effective in 200 metres

Regulatory sign effective in 300 metres

== Parking signs ==
No Stopping

Directional arrow supplementary plate (on the left side of this sign)

Directional arrow supplementary plate (on the right side of this sign)

Directional arrow supplementary plate (on both sides of this sign)

No Stopping (on the left side of this sign)

No Stopping (on the right side of this sign)

No Stopping (on both sides of this sign)

No Stopping at times prescribed (on the left side of this sign)

No Stopping at times prescribed (on the right side of this sign)

No Stopping at times prescribed (on both sides of this sign)

Late Night Extension

Clearway (No Stopping) (with single peak time)

Clearway (No Stopping) (with two peak times)

Clearway (No Stopping) during times specified

Clearway Begins

Clearway Ends

Parking Permitted: 30 Minutes (on the left of this sign, standard hours)

Parking Permitted: 30 Minutes (on the right of this sign, standard hours)

Parking Permitted: 30 Minutes (on both sides of this sign, standard hours)

Late Night Extension

Parking Permitted: 30 Minutes (on the left of this sign, non-standard hours)

Parking Permitted: 30 Minutes (on the right of this sign, non-standard hours)

Parking Permitted: 30 Minutes (on both sides of this sign, non-standard hours)

Parking Permitted: 30 Minutes (on the left of this sign, other times)

Parking Permitted: 30 Minutes (on the right of this sign, other times)

Parking Permitted: 30 Minutes (on both sides of this sign, other times)

Loading Zone Parking: 5 Minutes

Good Vehicles Only

5 Minute Maximum, Goods Vehicles Only

Motorcycle Parking

Cycle Parking

Bus Parking: No Limit

Tour Coaches Only

Shuttle Parking: No Limit

Disabled Parking: No Limit

No Parking

No Parking: Bus Stop

No Parking: Bus Stop

No Parking: Coach Stop

No Parking: Taxi Stand

No Parking: Shuttle Stop

No Parking: Tram Stop

No Parking: Emergency Vehicle Stop

Coupon Parking Zone Begins

Coupon Parking Zone Ends

Coupon Parking Zone (repeater sign)

Pay & Display Parking

Vehicles With Permits Exempt

Parking For Authorised Vehicles Only

== General advisory ==
No Exit

Left Turn At Any Time With Care (usually used on slip lanes)

Warning Bells At Railway Crossing Turned Off (at times prescribed)

Shared Zone

Construction Zone (to the left)

Construction Zone (to the right)

Railway Not In Use

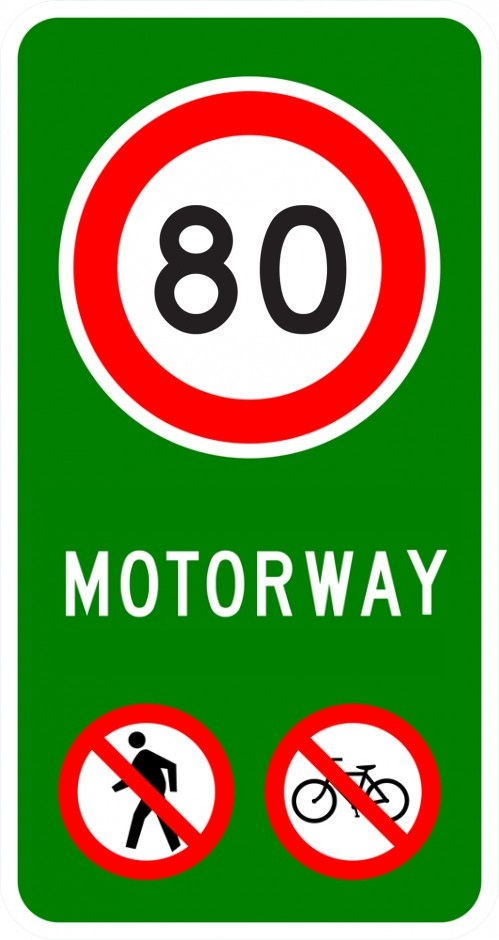
Motorway Begins (80 km/h speed limit)

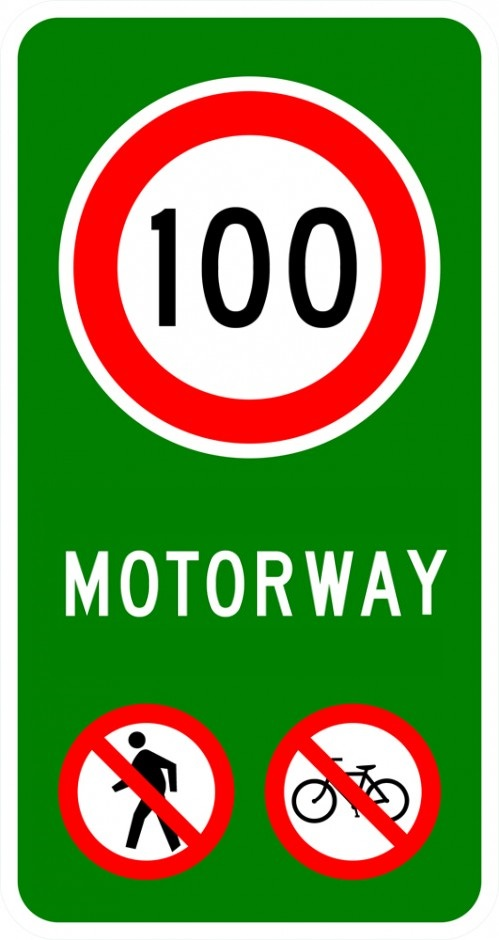
Motorway Begins (100 km/h speed limit)

Motorway Begins

Motorway Begins

Motorway Ends 100M

Motorway Ends

Motorway Ends

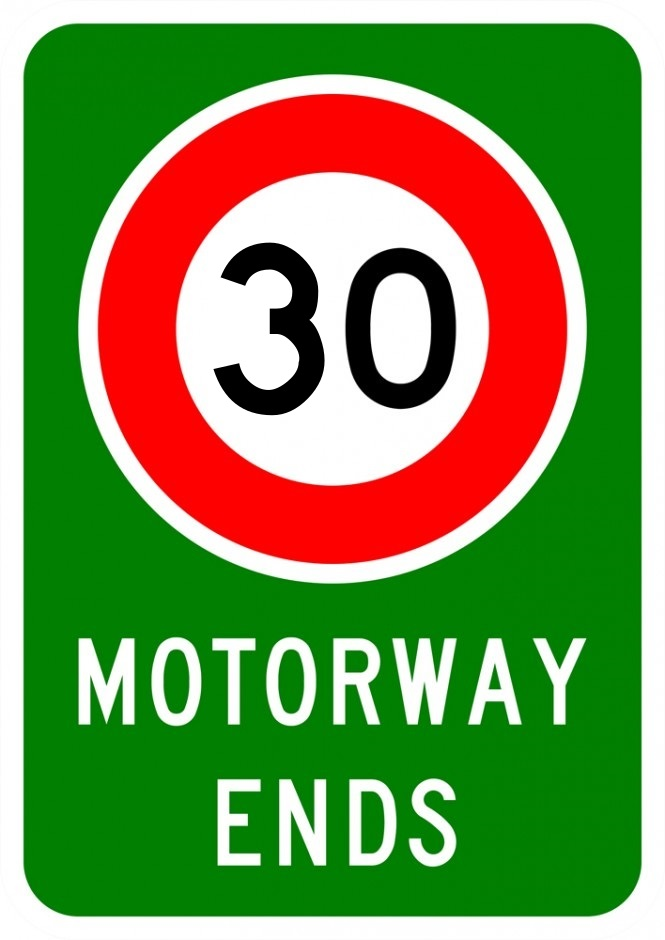
Motorway Ends (30 km/h speed limit)

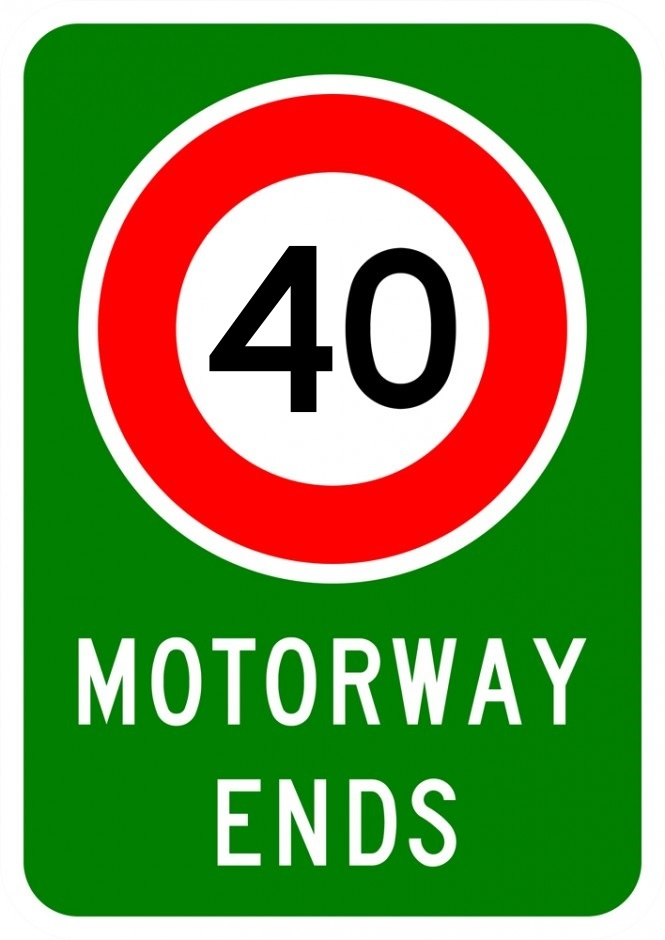
Motorway Ends (40 km/h speed limit)

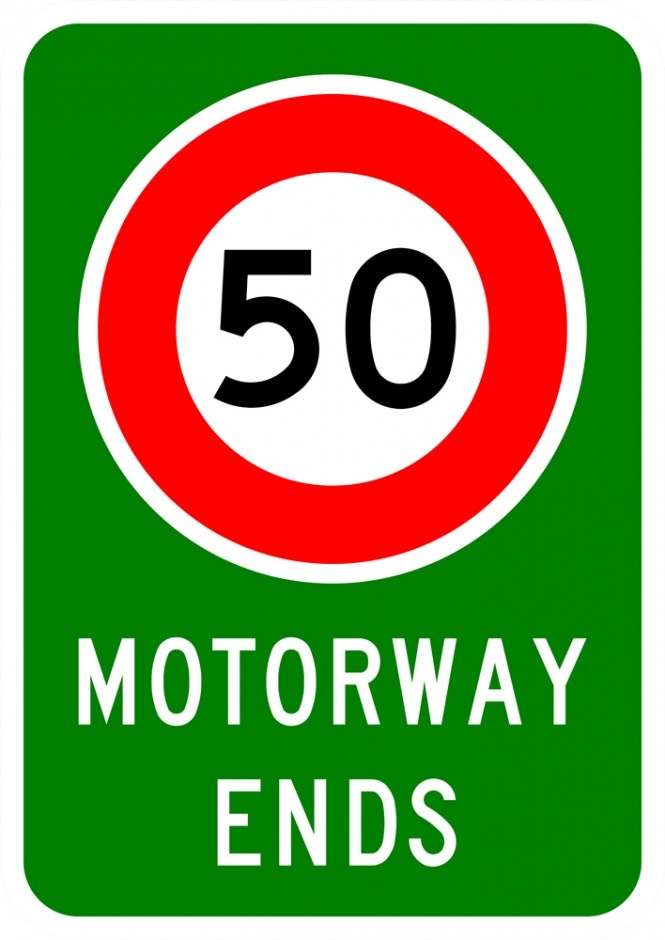
Motorway Ends (50 km/h speed limit)

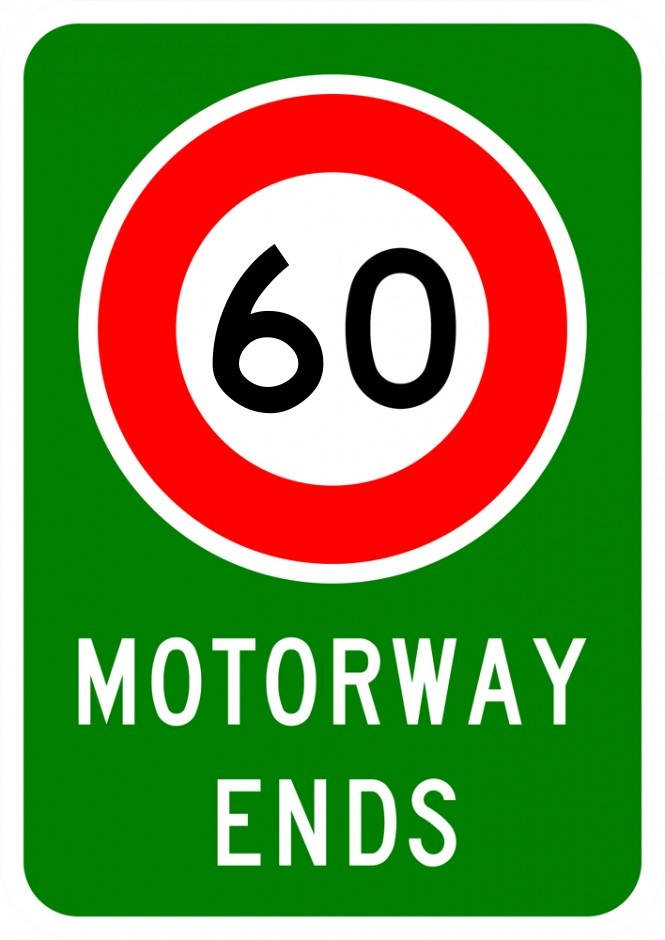
Motorway Ends (60 km/h speed limit)

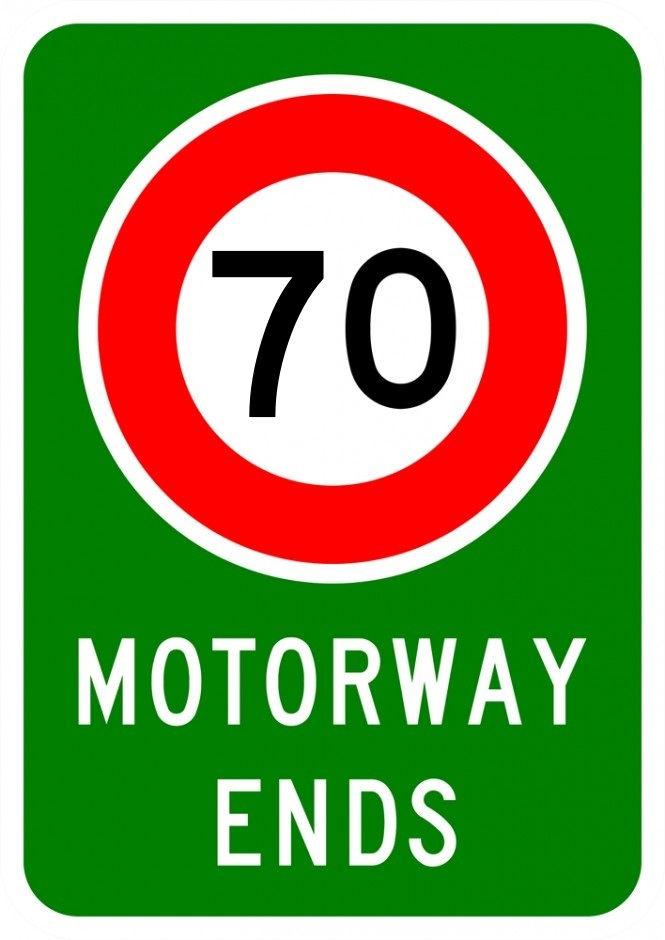
Motorway Ends (70 km/h speed limit)

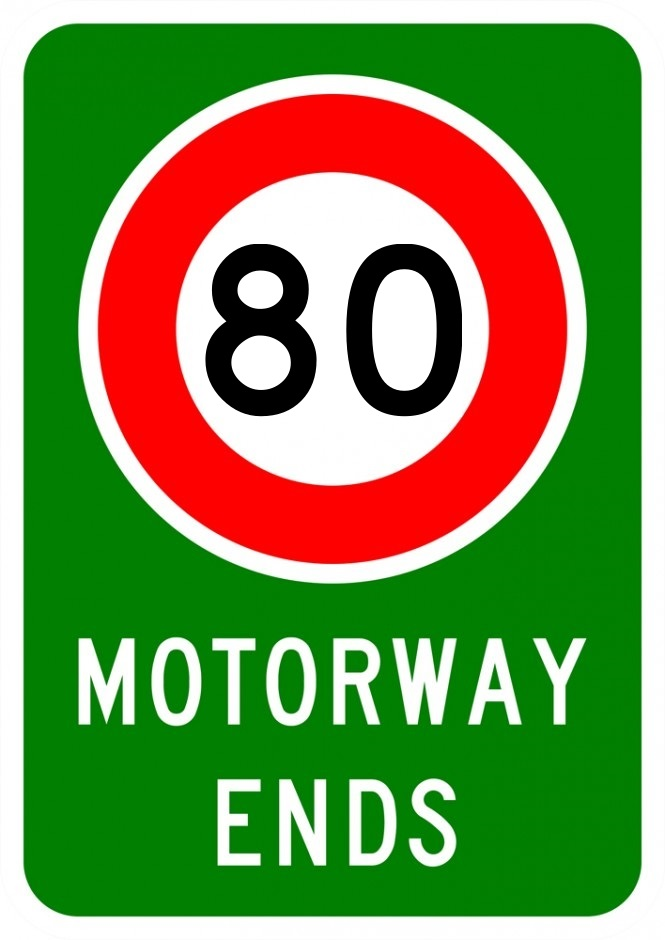
Motorway Ends (80 km/h speed limit)

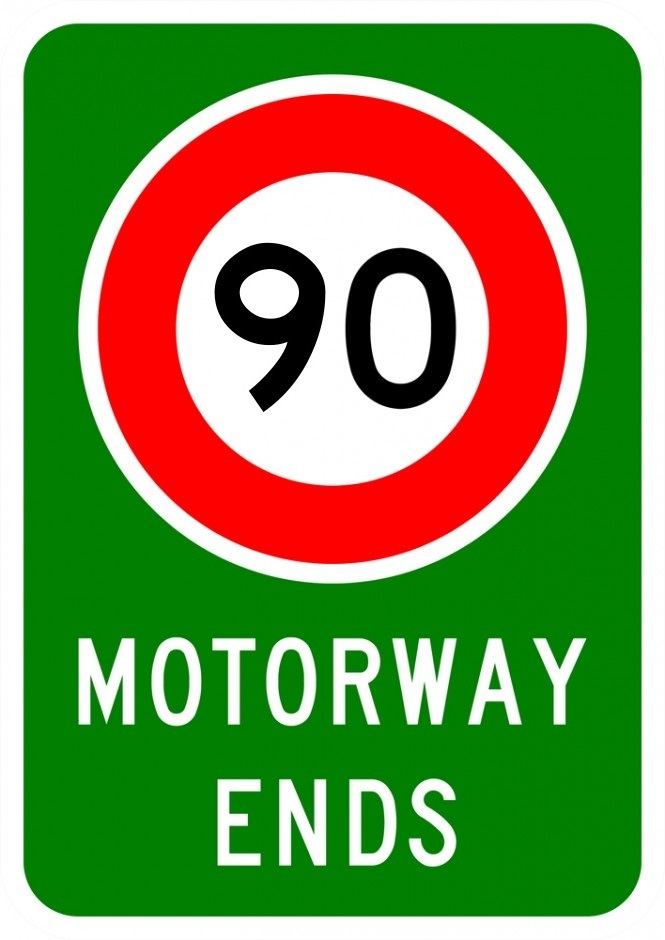
Motorway Ends (90 km/h speed limit)

Expressway Begins

Expressway Begins

Expressway Ends 100m

Expressway Ends

Expressway Ends

Heavy Vehicle By Pass Ahead (in 200 metres)

Heavy Vehicle By Pass (on left)

Heavy Vehicle By Pass (on right)

Passing Lane Ahead (in 1 kilometre)

Passing Bay Ahead (in 100 metres)

Slow Vehicle Bays (for the next 2 kilometres)

Slow Vehicle Bay Ahead (in 300 metres)

Slow Vehicle Bay (indicator sign)

Heavy Vehicles Please Do Not Use Engine Brakes (for the next 4 kilometres)

Stock Effluent Disposal Point Ahead (on left, in 300 metres)

Stock Effluent Disposal Point Ahead (on right, in 300 metres)

Stock Effluent Disposal Point Ahead (turning left, in 300 metres)

Stock Effluent Disposal Point Ahead (turning right, in 300 metres)

Stock Effluent Disposal Point (turn left)

Stock Effluent Disposal Point (turn right)

Stock Effluent Disposal Point (veer left)

Stock Effluent Disposal Point (veer right)

Cyclists Cross Here With Care (to the left)

Cyclists Cross Here With Care (to the right)

Cyclists Use Left Shoulder

Cyclists Use Ramp

Safety camera area (Speed cameras / red light cameras nearby)

Average speed camera area

== Warning signs ==
Stop ahead

Give Way ahead

10 km/h speed limit ahead

20 km/h speed limit ahead

30 km/h speed limit ahead

40 km/h speed limit ahead

50 km/h speed limit ahead

60 km/h speed limit ahead

70 km/h speed limit ahead

80 km/h speed limit ahead

90 km/h speed limit ahead

Traffic signals ahead

Prepare to stop ahead

Hidden queue ahead

Queued vehicles ahead

Roundabout ahead

Priority road straight ahead

Priority road turns left

Priority road turns right

Controlled T-junction (priority turns left)

Controlled T-junction (priority turns right)

Uncontrolled T-junction

Controlled side road junction on left

Controlled side road junction on right

Uncontrolled side road junction on left

Uncontrolled side road junction on right

Controlled Y-junction on right

Controlled Y-junction on left

Uncontrolled Y-junction

Merging traffic from left

Merging traffic from right

Merging traffic from both sides

Lane gain on left

Lane gain on right

90 degree curve, to left

90 degree curve, to right

Curve between 15 and 90 degrees, to left

Curve between 15 and 90 degrees, to right

Sharp curve between 90 and 120 degrees, to left

Sharp curve between 90 and 120 degrees, to right

Dangerous curve greater than 120 degrees, to left

Dangerous curve greater than 120 degrees, to right

Reverse curve less than 60 degrees, to left

Reverse curve less than 60 degrees, to right

Reverse curve greater than 60 degrees, to left

Reverse curve greater than 60 degrees, to right

Reverse curve with decreasing radius, to left

Reverse curve with decreasing radius, to right

Series of curves ahead, first to left

Series of curves ahead, first to right

Sign effective for the next 2 kilometres

Advisory speed: 15 km/h

Advisory speed: 25 km/h

Advisory speed: 35 km/h

Advisory speed: 45 km/h

Advisory speed: 55 km/h

Advisory speed: 65 km/h

Advisory speed: 75 km/h

Advisory speed: 85 km/h

Advisory speed: 95 km/h

Curve between 15 and 90 degrees with minor road, to left

Curve between 15 and 90 degrees with minor road, to right

Curve between 90 and 120 degrees with minor road, to left

Curve between 90 and 120 degrees with minor road, to right

Concealed

Truck advisory speed (danger of rollover if speed is exceeded)

Truck advisory speed (danger of rollover if speed is exceeded)

Road narrows on left

Road narrows on right

Road narrows on both sides

Narrow bridge

Tunnel ahead

Narrow Bridge, wide vehicles may come into your lane

Maximum overhead clearance ahead

Maximum height marker

Overhead electrical cables

Road diverges (splits)

Two-way traffic ahead

Road dip

Speed bump

Uneven road or series of bumps ahead

Falling rocks or debris on left

Falling rocks or debris on right

Slippery road

Road slippery when frosty

Road slippery when wet

Road has slippery gravel surface

Loose road surface (danger of stir up)

Attention: Other Dangers! (never used alone, a supplementary plate will explain the danger)

Ford

Cattle stop

Gate

Steep descent

Steep descent (with grade)

Steep ascent

Steep ascent (with grade)

Use lower gear

Trucks use lower gear

Railway level crossing on side road to left

Railway level crossing on side road to right

Railway level crossing on side road to left

Railway level crossing on side road to right

Railway level crossing on side road to left

Railway level crossing on side road to right

Railway level crossing on controlled T-junction to left

Railway level crossing on controlled T-junction to right

Railway level crossing on uncontrolled T-junction to left

Railway level crossing on uncontrolled T-junction to right

Railway Crossbuck

Railway Crossbuck (with red backing board)

Uncontrolled railway crossing ahead

Uncontrolled railway crossing ahead

Controlled railway crossing ahead with signals and gates

Look both ways for trains before crossing

Cyclists take care on rail tracks

Railway crossing ahead at a right angle

Railway crossing ahead at an oblique angle

Railway crossing ahead at an oblique angle

Light rail crossing

Light rail crossing

Pedestrians

Aged pedestrians

Pedestrian crossing ahead

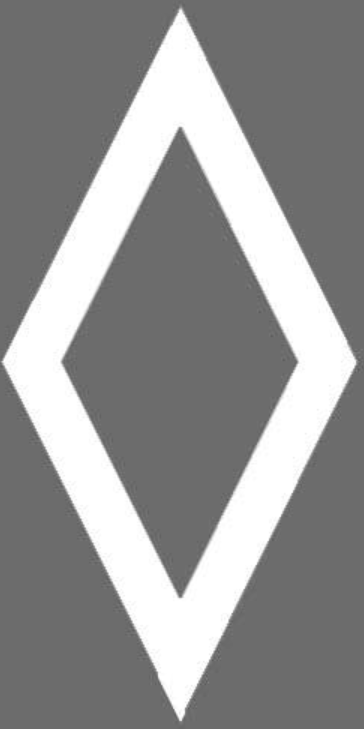
Pedestrian crossing ahead (road marking)

School crossing ahead

Kōhanga reo (preschool) crossing ahead

Pedestrian crossing (Belisha beacon)

Children

School

Kindergarten

Kōhanga reo

School bus route

School bus turning area

Watch for cyclists

Cyclists merging

Cyclists crossing

Watch for horseriders

Narrow bridge when cyclists present

Marae ahead

Danger of powerful wind gusts

Low-flying aircraft

Low-flying helicopters

Watch for animals (cattle)

Watch for animals (sheep)

Watch for animals (deer)

Watch for animals (feral horses)

Watch for animals (seals)

Watch for animals (pūkeko)

Watch for animals (ducks)

Watch for animals (penguins)

Watch for animals (kiwi)

Watch for animals (kererū)

Watch for trucks

Fire station

Watch for forklifts and other work vehicles

Roundabout hazard marker

End of road marker (used at T-junctions)

End of road marker (used at T-junctions)

Curve marker

Curve marker

Island curve marker

Island curve marker

Curve marker with integrated advisory speed

Curve marker with integrated advisory speed

Curve marker with integrated advisory speed

Curve marker with integrated advisory speed

== Temporary warning signs ==
Road Works Ahead

Grader

Mower

Weed sprayer

Road marking

On side road

Shoulder closed

Surveying

Wet tar

Skid testing

Bridge repairs

Road workers ahead in 1 kilometre

Road workers ahead in 1 kilometre, delays possible

Works End

Road works speed limit ahead - 10 km/h

Road works speed limit ahead - 20 km/h

Road works speed limit ahead - 30 km/h

Road works speed limit ahead - 40 km/h

Road works speed limit ahead - 50 km/h

Road works speed limit ahead - 60 km/h

Road works speed limit ahead - 70 km/h

Road works speed limit ahead - 80 km/h

Works end, thank you

Attention - Other Dangers! (never used alone, a supplementary plate will explain the danger)

Flooding

Washout

Line crew

Blasting

Tree Felling

Trucks Crossing

Logging Trucks

No Road Markings

Signals Changed

Signals Not Working

New Road Layout

Traffic Survey

Cycle Race

Runners

Walkers

Cyclists ahead

Runners ahead

Walkers ahead

Accident

Fire

Funeral

Film Crew

Hidden Queue

Barriers Not Working

Pedestrians

Trains Running

Falling rocks or debris on left

Falling rocks or debris on right

Slippery road

Slippery road surface due to ice or grit

Slow when wet

Loose road surface

New seal

Seal repairs

Watch for large animals (cattle)

Watch for large animals (sheep)

Traffic signals ahead

Flagman ahead

Please stop on request (for flagman)

Rough road surface

Lane management (two lanes, left lane merges)

Lane management (two lanes, right lane merges)

Lane management (three lanes, left lane merges)

Lane management (three lanes, right lane merges)

Lane management (three lanes, middle lane merges to the left)

Lane management (three lanes, middle lane merges to the right)

Lane management (four lanes, left lane merges)

Lane management (four lanes, right lane merges)

Lane management (two lanes shift to the left)

Lane management (two lanes shift to the right)

Lane management (three lanes shift to the left)

Lane management (three lanes shift to the right)

Lane management (lane entering from the left)

Lane management (lane joining traffic from the right)

Lane management (lane exiting to the left)

Exit marker

Road narrows on left

Road narrows on right

Road narrows on both sides

Road narrows to a single lane

Road diverges (splits)

Road closed ahead

Exit closed ahead

Detour ahead - follow circle symbol

Detour ahead - follow diamond symbol

Detour ahead - follow square symbol

Detour ahead - follow state highway shield

State highway detour ahead - follow state highway shield

Detour - follow circle symbol (straight ahead, left-hand)

Detour - follow circle symbol (straight ahead, right-hand)

Detour - follow circle symbol (to the left)

Detour - follow circle symbol (to the right)

Detour - follow circle symbol (veer left)

Detour - follow circle symbol (veer right)

Detour - follow diamond symbol (straight ahead, left-hand)

Detour - follow diamond symbol (straight ahead, right-hand)

Detour - follow diamond symbol (to the left)

Detour - follow diamond symbol (to the right)

Detour - follow diamond symbol (veer left)

Detour - follow diamond symbol (veer right)

Detour - follow square symbol (straight ahead, left-hand)

Detour - follow square symbol (straight ahead, right-hand)

Detour - follow square symbol (to the left)

Detour - follow square symbol (to the right)

Detour - follow square symbol (veer left)

Detour - follow square symbol (veer right)

Detour - follow state highway shield (straight ahead, left-hand)

Detour - follow state highway shield (straight ahead, right-hand)

Detour - follow state highway shield (to the left)

Detour - follow state highway shield (to the right)

Detour - follow state highway shield (veer left)

Detour - follow state highway shield (veer right)

Detour Ends

Crossing closed - please use alternative crossing

Footpath closed - please use other side

Pedestrians follow this sign (straight ahead, left-hand)

Pedestrians follow this sign (straight ahead, right-hand)

Pedestrians follow this sign (to the left)

Pedestrians follow this sign (to the right)

Pedestrians follow this sign (veer left)

Pedestrians follow this sign (veer right)

Cyclists follow this sign (straight ahead, left-hand)

Cyclists follow this sign (straight ahead, right-hand)

Cyclists follow this sign (to the left)

Cyclists follow this sign (to the right)

Cyclists follow this sign (veer left)

Cyclists follow this sign (veer right)

Emergency

Breakdown warning triangle

Pilot Car. Follow Me

Road Works

Road Inspection

Pass With Care

Cement Splashes - Wash Car Today

Lime Splashes - Wash Car Today

Dry Your Brakes

Thank You

Works site access - 100 metres ahead on left

Works site access - 100 metres ahead on right

Works site access - 200 metres ahead on left

Works site access - 200 metres ahead on right

Works site access on left

Works site access on right

== Vehicle Mounted ==
School Bus signals (orange lights will flash when children are boarding and disembarking)

School Vehicle

School Bus (affixed to school buses)

School (affixed to school buses)

Danger - Slow Down

Pilot Vehicle (for an over-dimension convoy)

House Ahead (house-carrying truck convoy ahead)

House Follows (house-carrying truck follows behind pilot)

Long Load Ahead (extra-long vehicle convoy ahead)

Long Load Follows (extra-long vehicle convoy follows behind pilot)

Wide Load Ahead (extra-wide vehicle convoy ahead)

Wide Load Follows (extra-wide vehicle convoy follows behind pilot)

== State highway shields ==
State Highway 1 marker

State Highway 1B marker

State Highway 1C marker

State Highway 1N marker

State Highway 2 marker

State Highway 3 marker

State Highway 3A marker

State Highway 4 marker

State Highway 5 marker

State Highway 6 marker

State Highway 6A marker

State Highway 7 marker

State Highway 7A marker

State Highway 8 marker

State Highway 8A marker

State Highway 8B marker

State Highway 10 marker

State Highway 11 marker

State Highway 12 marker

State Highway 14 marker

State Highway 15 marker

State Highway 16 marker

State Highway 18 marker

State Highway 20 marker

State Highway 20A marker

State Highway 20B marker

State Highway 20 marker

State Highway 20 marker

State Highway 20 marker

State Highway 20 marker

State Highway 20 marker

State Highway 25A marker

State Highway 26 marker

State Highway 27 marker

State Highway 28 marker

State Highway 29 marker

State Highway 29A marker

State Highway 30 marker

State Highway 30A marker

State Highway 31 marker

State Highway 32 marker

State Highway 33 marker

State Highway 34 marker

State Highway 35 marker

State Highway 36 marker

State Highway 37 marker

State Highway 38 marker

State Highway 39 marker

State Highway 41 marker

State Highway 43 marker

State Highway 44 marker

State Highway 45 marker

State Highway 46 marker

State Highway 47 marker

State Highway 48 marker

State Highway 49 marker

State Highway 50 marker

State Highway 51 marker

State Highway 53 marker

State Highway 54 marker

State Highway 56 marker

State Highway 57 marker

State Highway 58 marker

State Highway 59 marker

State Highway 60 marker

State Highway 62 marker

State Highway 63 marker

State Highway 65 marker

State Highway 67 marker

State Highway 67A marker

State Highway 69 marker

State Highway 71 marker

State Highway 73 marker

State Highway 74 marker

State Highway 74A marker

State Highway 75 marker

State Highway 76 marker

State Highway 77 marker

State Highway 78 marker

State Highway 79 marker

State Highway 80 marker

State Highway 82 marker

State Highway 83 marker

State Highway 84 marker

State Highway 85 marker

State Highway 86 marker

State Highway 87 marker

State Highway 88 marker

State Highway 90 marker

State Highway 93 marker

State Highway 94 marker

State Highway 95 marker

State Highway 96 marker

State Highway 97 marker

State Highway 98 marker

State Highway 99 marker

== Retired signs ==
=== 1928 road signs ===
Signs introduced in the New Zealand Gazette 1928 Issue 018

Sharp right angle

Sharp left angle

Right curve

Left curve

Double left curve

Double right curve

Intersection of two highways

Cross road to the right

Cross road to the left

Double cross road

Right angle with local road ahead

Left angle with local road ahead

Right angle, local road to the left

Left angle, local road to the left

Right curve with local road to the left

Right curve with local road to the right

Left curve with local road to the left

Left curve with local road to the right

Ascent to the right

Ascent to the left

Descent to the right

Descent to the left

=== 1933 road signs ===
Signs introduced in the New Zealand Gazette 1933 Issue 013

Railway crossing

School

Hospital

Populated (built-up) area

Dangerous corner

Railway crossing on side road

One way bridge

One way bridge, please give way

Speed limit

End speed limit

Stop

Motor traffic prohibited

=== 1966 road signs ===
Before 1966, New Zealand traffic signs were similar to that of the US around the same time. The following signs were introduced in the Traffic Sign Notice 1966 which was amended in 1970.

Give way

Turning traffic give way to pedestrians

One way

One way

Keep left

This Lane May Turn Left

This Lane May Turn Right

This Lane May Proceed Straight

This Lane May Proceed Straight or Turn Left

This Lane May Proceed Straight or Turn Right

Class C road

Class I road

Traffic signals ahead

Roundabout

Crossroads with priority ahead

Crossroads with priority (route turns left)

Crossroads with priority (route turns right)

Two-way traffic ahead

Slips

Pedestrians

Pedestrian crossing ahead

Children

Fire station

No Exit

Warning bells at railway crossing turned off

Heavy Vehicle By Pass Ahead

Heavy Vehicle By Pass Ahead

Heavy Vehicle By Pass

Heavy Vehicle By Pass

Heavy Vehicle By Pass

=== Obsolete state highway shields ===
State Highway 1A marker

State Highway 2A marker

State Highway 2B marker

State Highway 15A marker

State Highway 17 marker

State Highway 40 marker

State Highway 49A marker

State Highway 50A marker

State Highway 52 marker

State Highway 57A marker

State Highway 61 marker

State Highway 70 marker

State Highway 73A marker

State Highway 91 marker

State Highway 92 marker

== Location Referencing Management System (LRMS) ==
The NZ Transport Agency (NZTA; Māori: Waka Kotahi) uses a linear location referencing system for its State Highway network, nationwide. This assists roading contractors, safety auditors and emergency services in pin-pointing locations across the country. The LRMS features several types of signs and methods of reference. All KMP's are installed using a calibrated Trip Meter from the beginning of the road. ERP's, however, are placed using land surveying equipment.

All LRMS signs are installed on the 'true left' side of the lane or carriageway, this is determined by the left hand side when facing the increasing direction, The increasing direction of travel is the direction in which positive measurements are made. Divided carriageways (roads with concrete berms or centrelines) have an Increasing (I) side and a Decreasing (D) side. This can be seen on LRMS signs in these areas.

=== Established Route Position (ERP) ===
Established Route Position signs are used to highlight a special location or bearing on the highway, These are placed routinely along the carriageways, usually every 3 km. They feature the current Reference Station and the number of kilometres from the beginning of that Reference Station. These are required by the NZTA to have an accuracy of less than 3 metres. ERP signs are double-sided and feature a reflective green strip. They also have a small yellow triangle on the post pointing in the roads increasing direction.

=== Kilometre Marker Post (KMP) ===
Kilometre Marker Post signs are used to highlight the progression along the highway, These are placed routinely along the carriageways, every 1000 metres. They feature the State Highway Shield, the current Reference Station and the number of kilometres from the beginning of that Reference Station. These are required by the NZTA to have an accuracy of less than 100 metres. KMP signs are on plastic, flexible posts. They are double-sided and feature a reflective black strip.

=== Reference Station (RS) ===
Reference Station signs are placed at the change of a Reference Station, or beginning of a Highway. KMP and ERP signs are reset to zero at the beginning of each RS.

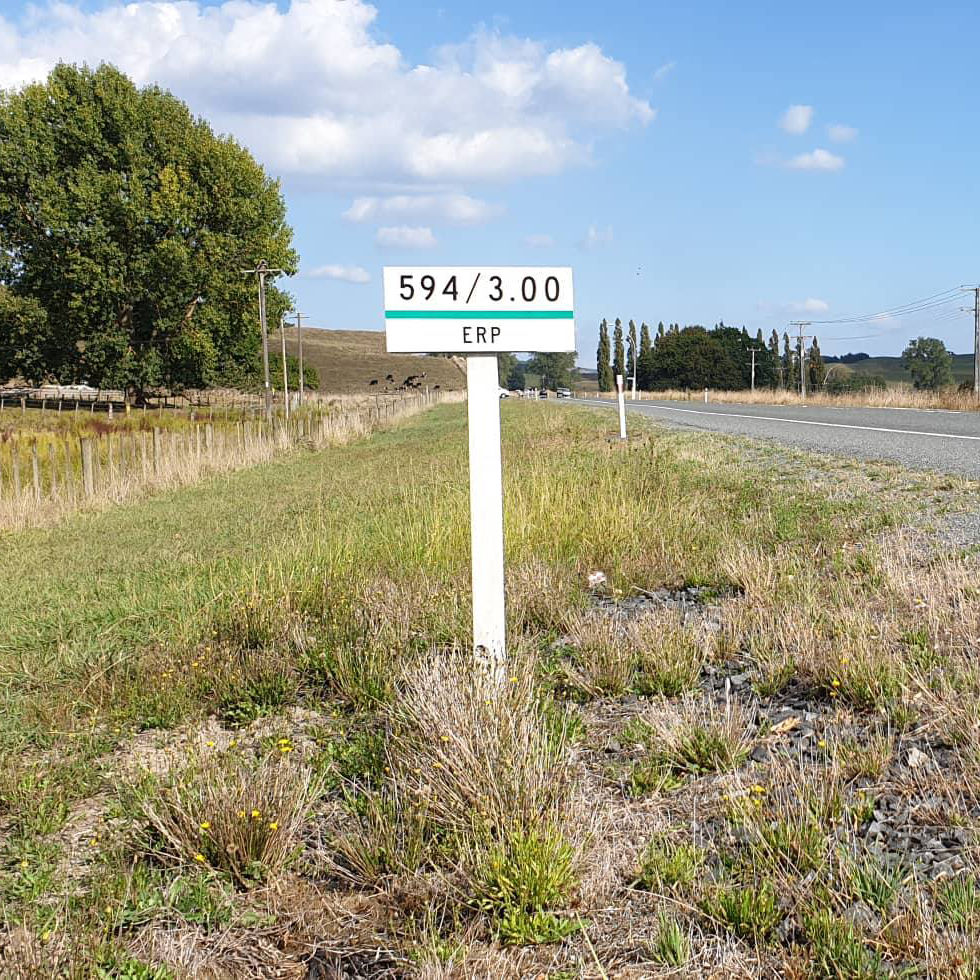
ERP Sign (SH1, Route Station 594, 3 km)

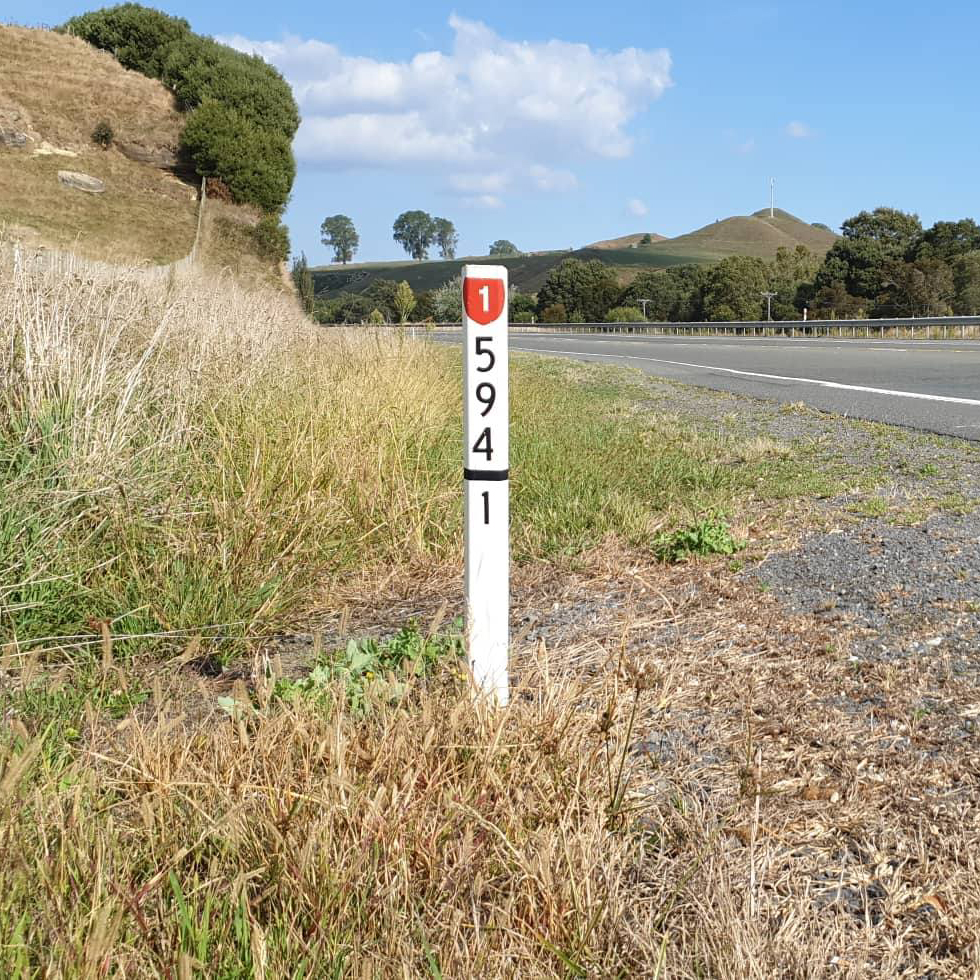
KMP Sign (SH1, Route Station 594, 1 km)

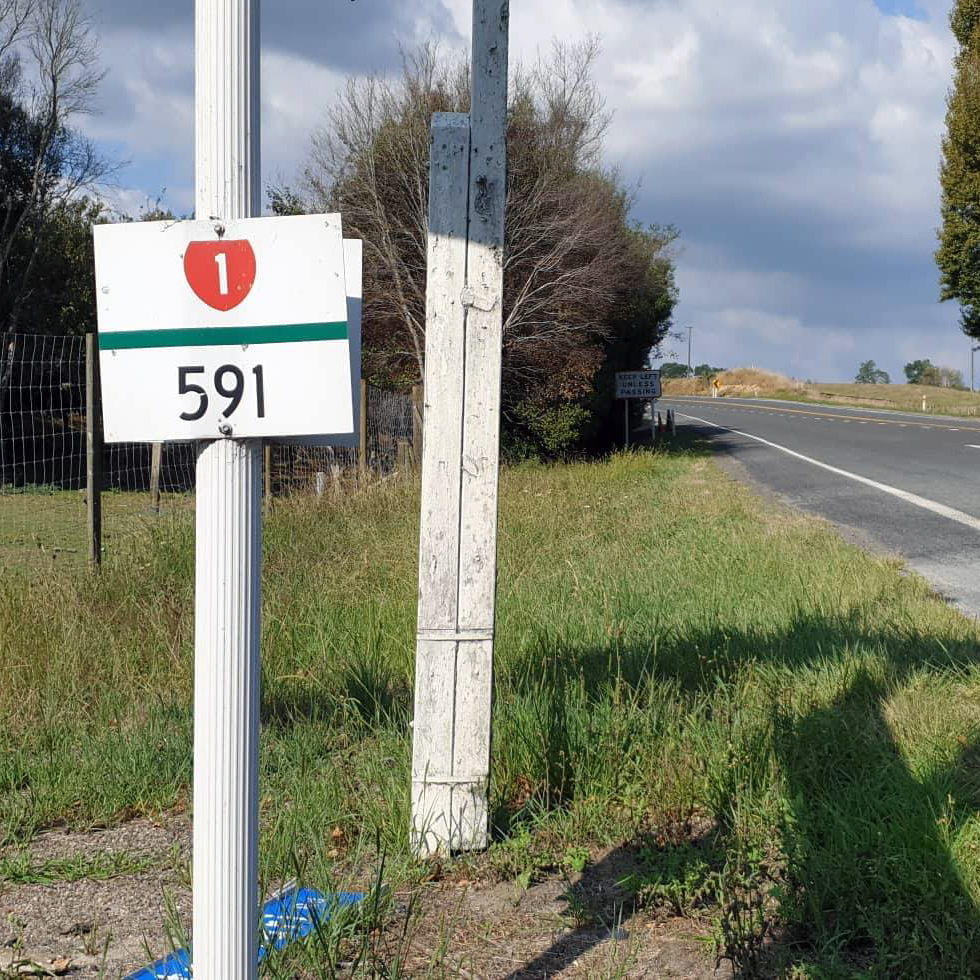
RS Sign (SH1, Route Station 591)

== See also ==
- Speed limits in New Zealand
