= Speed limits in New Zealand =

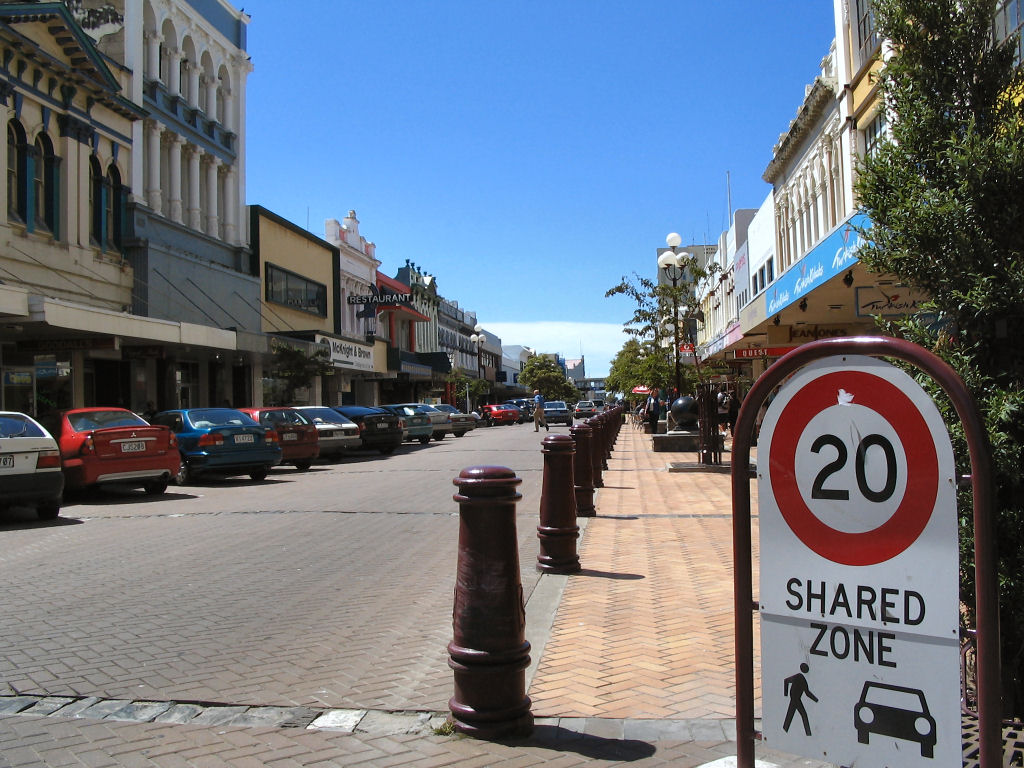
A road sign indicating 20 km/h in Invercargill city centre

General speed limits in New Zealand are set by the New Zealand government. The speed limit in each location is indicated on a nearby traffic sign or by the presence of street lighting. The limits have been posted in kilometres per hour (km/h) since December 1976. Before then, when New Zealand used imperial units, maximum speeds were displayed in miles per hour (mph). Today, limits range from 10 km/h (6.2 mph) to 110 km/h (68 mph); in urban areas the default speed limit is 50 km/h (31 mph).

== History ==
A 30 mile (48 kilometre) per hour speed limit was imposed in 1930. The limit was raised as vehicles became more powerful. Emergency legislation during the Second World War had amended the general speed limit set by the 1936 Traffic Regulations to 40 mph in order to reduce tyre wear and improve road safety. In 1948, the general speed limit was increased to 50 mph. The default speed limit was raised to 55 miles per hour (89 km/h) in 1962. In 1969, some open road speed limits were increased to 60 miles per hour (97 km/h).

On 4 December 1973, the default open road speed limit got dropped to 50 miles per hour (80 km/h); this was partly a fuel saving measure in response to the 1973 oil crisis. When New Zealand metricated in 1975, the 50 mph speed limit became 80 km/h while the urban 30 mph speed limit became 50 km/h. Metric speed limits included the legend "km/h" to distinguish them from imperial speed limits; this was dropped from 1987 onwards. On 1 July 1985, the open road speed limit was raised to 100 kilometres per hour (62 mph) and this remains the default speed limit today.

Enforcement of New Zealand road speed limits was traditionally done using police speed cameras set up and operated by the police. In 1993, mobile speed cameras were introduced.

Significant changes were made to the rules for setting speed limits in 2003 and 2011, including provision for 40 km/h limits. However, it was then necessary to introduce the Land Transport (Speed Limits Validation) Bill in 2015 to confirm the legitimacy of the previous changes. Another significant change in August 2017 introduced a provision for 110 km/h limits on some motorways and expressways.

In July 2019, the Sixth Labour Government released its "Road to Zero" 2020-2030 road safety strategy, which aimed to reduce road deaths by 40% by 2030. The "Road to Zero" strategy proposed reducing 87% of current speed limits, installing more median barriers and roundabouts and raising minimum standards for both new and used vehicles. Road to Zero was modelled after the global Vision Zero movement to reduce road tolls. The Road to Zero strategy was adopted in 2020. In February 2022, Waka Kotahi NZ Transport Agency and the New Zealand Police launched a public awareness campaign to promote Road to Zero. Waka Kotahi also announced a review of speed limits and that new speed limit rules would be implemented around schools.

During the 2023 New Zealand general election, the National Party campaigned on reversing the Labour Government's "blanket" speed limit reductions. In March 2024, the Sixth National Government confirmed that it would be fulfilling its pre-election promise of reversing speed limit reductions. The National Government's proposed new rules have included raising 30km/h limits back to 50km/h, 80km/h limits back 100km/h and allowing maximum speed limits of 120km/h on some roads. All school zones would be required to have a variable speed limit of 30km/h during drop-off and pick up times instead of a constant 30km/h limit. Speed limit changes would require a cost benefit analysis that considers both safety and "economic impacts." Several local councils, academics, health professionals and safety experts including the Horowhenua District Council, Timaru District Council, Kapiti Coast District Council, Global Road Safety Partnership CEO David Cliff and University of Canterbury Professor Simon Kingham expressed concern that reverseing speed limit reductions would lead to increased road fatalities, safety risks and pollution.

== Current speed limits ==
By default, the speed limit is 50 km/h in urban and built-up areas, and 100 km/h outside urban and built-up areas and on expressways and motorways.

Other speed limits include:

- 110 km/h – found on selected high-quality motorways and expressways.
- 90 km/h – used sparingly as a compromise between an 80 km/h and a 100 km/h limit, typically in Safe Speed Areas of busy State Highways.
- 80 km/h – generally found on rural access roads, winding rural roads, and limited-access urban arterial roads. Between metrication in 1975 and 1985, 80 km/h was the open road limit.
- 70 km/h – used sparingly as a compromise between a 60 km/h and an 80 km/h limit. Historically it has been used in small country towns, urban fringes (often preceding a change from the open limit to urban limit), or where development is on only one side of the road.
- 60 km/h – generally found on urban arterial roads, including those through rural townships.
- 40 km/h – generally found in residential areas. The Land Transport Rule: Setting of Speed Limits 2003 allowed councils to set limits below 50 km/h in urban areas. Since then many councils have set lower limits. For example, Safer Speed Areas were first introduced in Hamilton in 2011 and by 2014 there were 36 of them.
- 30 km/h – generally found in some city centres with high pedestrian traffic, and since 2023 in selected areas around schools.
- 20 km/h – when approaching and passing a school bus that has stopped on either side of the road to pick up or set down passengers. This speed limit applies to traffic travelling in both directions. Also applies when passing an accident scene.
- 10 km/h – Often found in designated locations such as car parks and other places where many vehicles and pedestrians share the road (Shared Zones).

=== 110 km/h limits ===
The default maximum speed limit on the open road in New Zealand is 100 km/h (62 mph). The Land Transport (Setting of Speed Limits) Rule 2017, which came into force on 24 August 2017, added a provision to set speed limits of 110 km/h (68 mph) on selected motorways and expressways. To be considered for a 110 km/h limit, the road must be a dual carriageway, with a median barrier, no at-grade intersections, and no corners rated for a speed below 110 km/h. Vehicles subject to a lower maximum speed, such as heavy trucks and towing vehicles, are still subject to that lower limit.

The first two roads with a 110 km/h speed limit were gazetted on 28 November 2017, with the speed limits coming into force on 11 December 2017. These roads are:

- SH 1 Waikato Expressway, from around 1.3 km south of the Tamahere interchange (SH 21) to the end of the expressway at the Cambridge South interchange.
- SH 2 Tauranga Eastern Link, from the Domain Road interchange to the end of the motorway at the Paengaroa roundabout (SH 33).

Following the opening of the Hamilton section of the Waikato Expressway in July 2022, the 110 km/h limit on the expressway was extended northward to the Hampton Downs interchange.

As of November 2024, the SH 1 Kapiti Expressway, from north of Raumati interchange to south of the Ōtaki northern interchange, has the speed limit increased to 110km/h on a 24.5 km stretch.

As of April 2025, the SH 1/SH 76 Christchurch Southern Motorway has the speed limit increased to 110km/h on a 17.7 km stretch, the first motorway to have that speed increase on the South Island.

As of May 2025, another section of SH 1 Northern Gateway Toll Road, from north of Orewa to just south of the Johnstone’s Hill Tunnels, has the speed limit increased to 110km/h on a 5.5km stretch.

As of July 2025, another section of SH 1, from north of Puhoi to Warkworth, has the speed limit increased to 110km/h on a 15 km stretch.

As of February 2026, another section of SH 1 Transmission Gully, from north of Linden to Paekākāriki, has the speed limit increased to 110km/h on a 27 km stretch.

=== Types of speed limit ===
There are several different types of speed limit:

- Default – The default speed limit is only posted as the speed limit when entering or leaving the designated urban and rural areas. In urban areas the default speed limit is 50 km/h, while in rural areas the speed limit is 100 km/h. The definition of an urban area is based on the presence of street lighting.
- Permanent – where the posted speed limit is set for the specific section of road. There are repeater signs every 2 to 3 kilometres on these roads. These limits are often posted in areas where the urban or rural nature of the area is not obvious to road users and applying the default speed limit is unsafe.
- Holiday – where the posted speed limit only applies for specific (holiday) periods. Outside the specific period the speed limit sign is removed or not visible.
- Variable – where the speed limit can change at different times of the day due to the changing nature of road hazards. Often found in the school zone around many educational institutions. May also be encountered on roads that have peak hour congestion or weather related hazards. Traffic travelling in different directions may potentially encounter different limits.
- Temporary – are put in place when there is work taking place on or near the road that makes the existing speed limit unsafe.
- Emergency – can be imposed during and after natural disasters, such as earthquakes, floods, fires, tornadoes, etc. where existing speed limits are unsafe.

== Advisory speeds ==
Advisory speeds are often given for road curves, corners, humps, dips and other short sections of road where driving at the speed limit may be uncomfortable or unsafe. These advisory speeds are indicated by a yellow sign with black lettering, or a black sign with white lettering when part of old (white on black) curve markers, and the numbers typically end with 5 to distinguish them from speed limits which typically end with 0. They advise of a comfortable speed through a corner in dry weather for a light motor vehicle. Heavy vehicle drivers are advised to keep 10 km/h below the advisory speed to avoid exceeding the static rollover threshold.

== Minimum speed ==
Although there is no minimum posted speed limit, it is illegal to drive at an "unreasonably slow speed" which means slow drivers are required by law to pull over to the side of the road to allow queues of cars behind them to pass. The police can and do enforce this law in which the offending driver is given anything from an NZ$150 infringement notice for "Inconsiderate Driving" to possibly an indictment for careless driving which is usually dealt with by the courts.

== Operating speed limits ==
Certain types and combinations of vehicles have operating speed limits that need to be obeyed if they are less than the posted speed limit. For example: Vehicles towing trailers or another vehicle with a rigid towing connection are limited to 90 km/h. If the towing connection is not rigid, such as a rope or strop, then the operating limit is 50 km/h, apart from disabled motorcycles.

== Signage ==
New Zealand speed limit signs follow the European model of a number inside a red circle. Sometimes, the open road limit occurs as a black forward slash inside a thin black ring (similar to the UK's National Speed Limit sign).

10 km/h speed limit

20 km/h speed limit

30 km/h speed limit

40 km/h speed limit

50 km/h speed limit

60 km/h speed limit

70 km/h speed limit

80 km/h speed limit

90 km/h speed limit

100 km/h speed limit (this is the maximum legal speed for motor vehicles in New Zealand, unless otherwise specified)

(R1-1.2) 110 km/h speed limit

Speed Limit Derestriction (open road with no posted speed limit, but the maximum legal limit of 100 km/h still must be obeyed)

15 km/h advisory speed

25 km/h advisory speed

35 km/h advisory speed

45 km/h advisory speed

55 km/h advisory speed

65 km/h advisory speed

75 km/h advisory speed

85 km/h advisory speed

95 km/h advisory speed

Limited Speed Zone (no longer in use)
