= Carless days in New Zealand =

1979–80 petrol demand reduction scheme

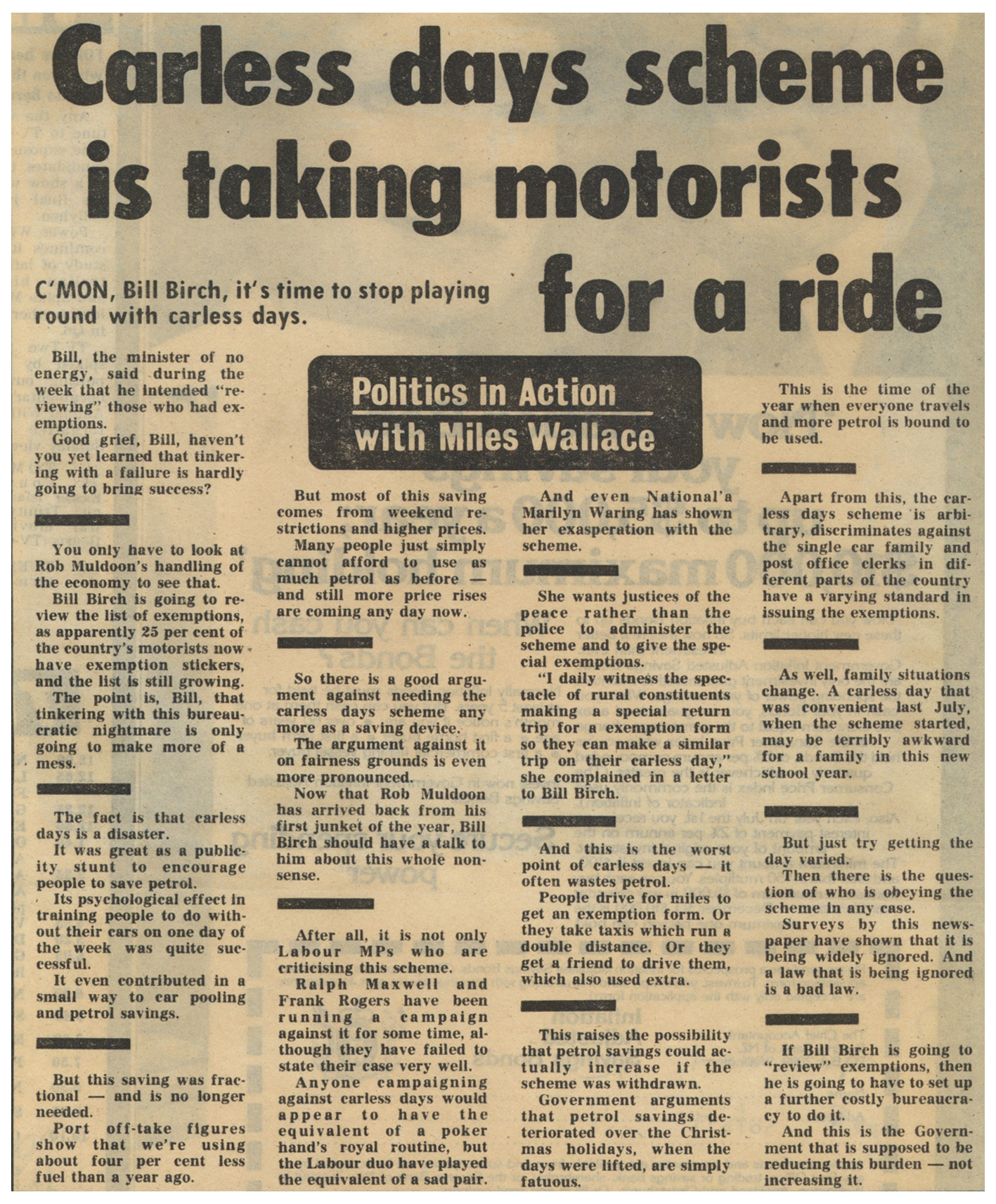
Newspaper clipping about carless days

Carless days was a petrol demand reduction scheme active in New Zealand from July 1979 to May 1980. Introduced by the Third National Government of New Zealand, during the 1979 oil crisis, the scheme prohibited owners of private petrol-powered vehicles to drive on a self-designated day of the week. The enabling regulations were one of several attempts to help the New Zealand economy after the oil shocks of the late 1970s—other such policies included the Think Big strategy.

== Background ==
New Zealand in the first half of 1978 sourced 39% of its oil from Iran. The Iranian Revolution and the subsequent 1979 oil shock led to a sudden reduction in oil available on the market. Consequently, international oil prices increased by a factor of 15 in nominal terms or a factor of 7 in real terms between 1972 and 1980. Despite active price controls in New Zealand, local prices also rose rapidly from $0.10 in 1972 to $0.62 in 1980. These price increases decreased demand; a 24.8% price increase in May before the introduction of the carless days scheme reduced petrol demand by 11%. As a result of the oil shock and the difficulty in obtaining oil elsewhere in a tight market, in March 1979, the country was receiving approximately 10-15% less oil than it normally would. According to Energy Minister Bill Birch, buying oil on the spot market to supplement supplies was not possible due to the New Zealand's unfavourable balance of payments. Nonetheless, by June 1979, the oil shortage had been reduced to 5%.

Prior to the introduction of carless days, the government had implemented other measures to reduce petrol demand. One measure was the reduction of the speed limit from 100 km/h to 80 km/h in December 1973 during the earlier 1973 oil crisis. The lower speed limit remained in place until July 1986. Another measure implemented in February 1979, was the ban on the sale of petrol on weekends to most motorists with exceptions for emergency situations and essential users. Several countries including Switzerland, the Netherlands and West Germany implemented similar carless Sundays during the 1973 oil crisis. The government also encouraged the use of alternative fuels like Compressed natural gas and Liquefied petroleum gas. Interest free loans were provided for the conversion of vehicles to run on gas and subsidies were provided for gas refueling infrastructure. By 1985, nearly 7% of the car fleet had been fitted to run on CNG. In March 1979, the government launched a publicity campaign urging the public to reduce petrol use by 10% warning that it would have to implement carless days if sustained cuts to consumption were not made.

According to Bill Birch, the minister of energy at the time, the government considered rationing, but chose carless days instead as it required less regulation and was easier to start and suspend quickly. A survey of 2200 people held in March 1979, showed that rationing was the preferred option among respondents to reduce petrol use followed by weekend closings and carless days.

== Scheme ==
Under the carless days regulations, the owners of most private petrol-powered motor vehicles under 4,400 pounds (2,000 kg), with the exception of motorcycles, were required to refrain from using their car on one day of the week, that day being designated by the owner. Exemptions were issued for essential services and those with no alternatives to using their own vehicles. Each vehicle displayed a coloured sticker on its windscreen which noted the day on which it could not be used. Infringements were punishable by a fine of up to $400 (approx. $2500 in 2022 dollars).

Thursday was the most frequently chosen carless day. By the time the regulations were suspended, 43% of registered vehicles had exemptions. A black market for exemption stickers and imitations of them quickly developed, weakening the effectiveness of the scheme. There was also a distinct problem in inequality—households that could afford to run two cars could simply choose different days for the two cars and continue to drive on all seven days as before.

=== Implementation ===
The carless days regulations are secondary legislation under the Economic Stabilisation Act 1948 and therefore did not require approval from parliament. Carless days were suspended in May 1980, revoked in December 1980 and in 1981 replaced with petrol rationing legislation (the Petroleum Demand Restraint Act 1981) that can be invoked in the future.

== Response ==
Surveys showed that 5–10% of the population bound by the rules drove regularly on their carless day. Journalist Richard Griffin said that "it was a bit like drunk driving—if you could get away with it you did. There was no stigma attached ...".

There were 3,136 successful prosecutions against those who broke the carless days rules. It is estimated that approximately 0.2% of the people breaking the rules were caught and prosecuted. The first person prosecuted under the scheme was Gordon Marks of Christchurch, who forgot that at 3:45am, after a post-party nap in his car, his "car-less day" had started at 2am. At his trial, the judge understood Marks's error, but he was still fined $50 rather than the $400 maximum fine to show the legislation had "teeth".

== Impact ==
The government claimed that the plan reduced petrol consumption by 3%, while independent analysis estimated a reduction of 3.6%. Those that were subject to the scheme reduced their petrol consumption by 5%. It is estimated that the price would have had to rise by 87.5% to achieve the same reduction in petrol consumption achieved by carless days.

Carless days led to notable mode shift for work and shopping trips. While cars continued to be used for the majority of work trips on carless days (from 88% to 66%), there was a notable increase in car pooling (5% to 19%), bus (2% to 7%), motorbike (2% to 7%) and bicycle usage (7% to 12%). Shopping trips while still predominantly done by car on carless days (88% to 55%), led to mode shift towards bicycle usage (3% to 15%) and walking (9% to 20%). Recreational trips also continued to be taken by car on carless days (88% to 66%), however a significant proportion (33%) of trips were postponed and there was little evidence of mode shift.
