= Marotiri, New Zealand =

Rural locality in Waikato, New Zealand

Marotiri
- Rural locality
- Interactive map of Marotiri
- Coordinates: 38.543840°S 175.817962°E
- Country: New Zealand
- Region: Waikato region
- District: Taupō District
- Ward: Mangakino-Pouakani General Ward
- Electorates: Taupō; Te Tai Hauāuru (Māori)

Government
  - Territorial Authority: Taupō District Council
  - Regional council: Waikato Regional Council
  - Mayor of Taupō: John Funnell
  - Taupō MP: Louise Upston
  - Hauraki-Waikato MP: Hana-Rawhiti Maipi-Clarke

Area
  - Total: 181.96 km^{2} (70.26 sq mi)

Population (2023 Census)
  - Total: 507
  - Density: 2.79/km^{2} (7.22/sq mi)
- Postcode(s): 3492

Marotiri is a rural community in the Taupō District and Waikato region of New Zealand's North Island. State Highway 32 runs through it.

The community has an annual family agricultural day each November.

== Demographics ==
Marotiri locality covers 181.96 km^{2} (70.26 sq mi). The locality is part of the larger Marotiri statistical area.

Historical population for the locality
Year	Pop.	±% p.a.
2006	381	—
2013	405	+0.88%
2018	453	+2.27%
2023	507	+2.28%

Marotiri locality had a population of 507 in the 2023 New Zealand census, an increase of 54 people (11.9%) since the 2018 census, and an increase of 102 people (25.2%) since the 2013 census. There were 264 males and 240 females in 183 dwellings. 0.6% of people identified as LGBTIQ+. There were 99 people (19.5%) aged under 15 years, 69 (13.6%) aged 15 to 29, 261 (51.5%) aged 30 to 64, and 72 (14.2%) aged 65 or older.

People could identify as more than one ethnicity. The results were 78.7% European (Pākehā), 26.0% Māori, 5.3% Pasifika, 7.1% Asian, and 2.4% other, which includes people giving their ethnicity as "New Zealander". English was spoken by 97.0%, Māori by 5.3%, and other languages by 7.1%. No language could be spoken by 2.4% (e.g. too young to talk). The percentage of people born overseas was 16.0, compared with 28.8% nationally.

Religious affiliations were 17.8% Christian, 1.2% Hindu, 0.6% Māori religious beliefs, 1.2% Buddhist, 1.2% New Age, and 3.0% other religions. People who answered that they had no religion were 66.9%, and 8.9% of people did not answer the census question.

Of those at least 15 years old, 54 (13.2%) people had a bachelor's or higher degree, 255 (62.5%) had a post-high school certificate or diploma, and 99 (24.3%) people exclusively held high school qualifications. 39 people (9.6%) earned over $100,000 compared to 12.1% nationally. The employment status of those at least 15 was 228 (55.9%) full-time, 57 (14.0%) part-time, and 12 (2.9%) unemployed.

=== Marotiri statistical area ===
Marotiri statistical area, which also includes Mokai and Whakamaru, covers 740.98 km^{2} (286.09 sq mi) and had an estimated population of 1,720 as of June 2025, with a population density of 2 people per km^{2}.

Historical population for the statistical area
Year	Pop.	±% p.a.
2013	1,473	—
2018	1,557	+1.12%
2023	1,581	+0.31%

The statistical area had a population of 1,581 in the 2023 New Zealand census, an increase of 24 people (1.5%) since the 2018 census, and an increase of 108 people (7.3%) since the 2013 census. There were 825 males, 750 females, and 6 people of other genders in 558 dwellings. 2.1% of people identified as LGBTIQ+. The median age was 34.6 years (compared with 38.1 years nationally). There were 369 people (23.3%) aged under 15 years, 291 (18.4%) aged 15 to 29, 765 (48.4%) aged 30 to 64, and 156 (9.9%) aged 65 or older.

People could identify as more than one ethnicity. The results were 73.6% European (Pākehā); 29.6% Māori; 3.8% Pasifika; 10.6% Asian; 1.1% Middle Eastern, Latin American and African New Zealanders (MELAA); and 2.3% other, which includes people giving their ethnicity as "New Zealander". English was spoken by 96.8%, Māori by 6.3%, Samoan by 0.2%, and other languages by 7.4%. No language could be spoken by 2.8% (e.g. too young to talk). The percentage of people born overseas was 17.5, compared with 28.8% nationally.

Religious affiliations were 22.0% Christian, 0.9% Hindu, 1.9% Islam, 1.5% Māori religious beliefs, 0.2% Buddhist, 0.6% New Age, and 2.5% other religions. People who answered that they had no religion were 64.5%, and 5.9% of people did not answer the census question.

Of those at least 15 years old, 177 (14.6%) people had a bachelor's or higher degree, 735 (60.6%) had a post-high school certificate or diploma, and 297 (24.5%) people exclusively held high school qualifications. The median income was $48,200, compared with $41,500 nationally. 114 people (9.4%) earned over $100,000 compared to 12.1% nationally. The employment status of those at least 15 was 729 (60.1%) full-time, 162 (13.4%) part-time, and 33 (2.7%) unemployed.

== Education ==
Marotiri School is a co-educational state primary school, with a roll of 170 as of July 2026. The school opened in 1961.
