= State Highway 33 (New Zealand) =

Road in New Zealand

State Highway 33

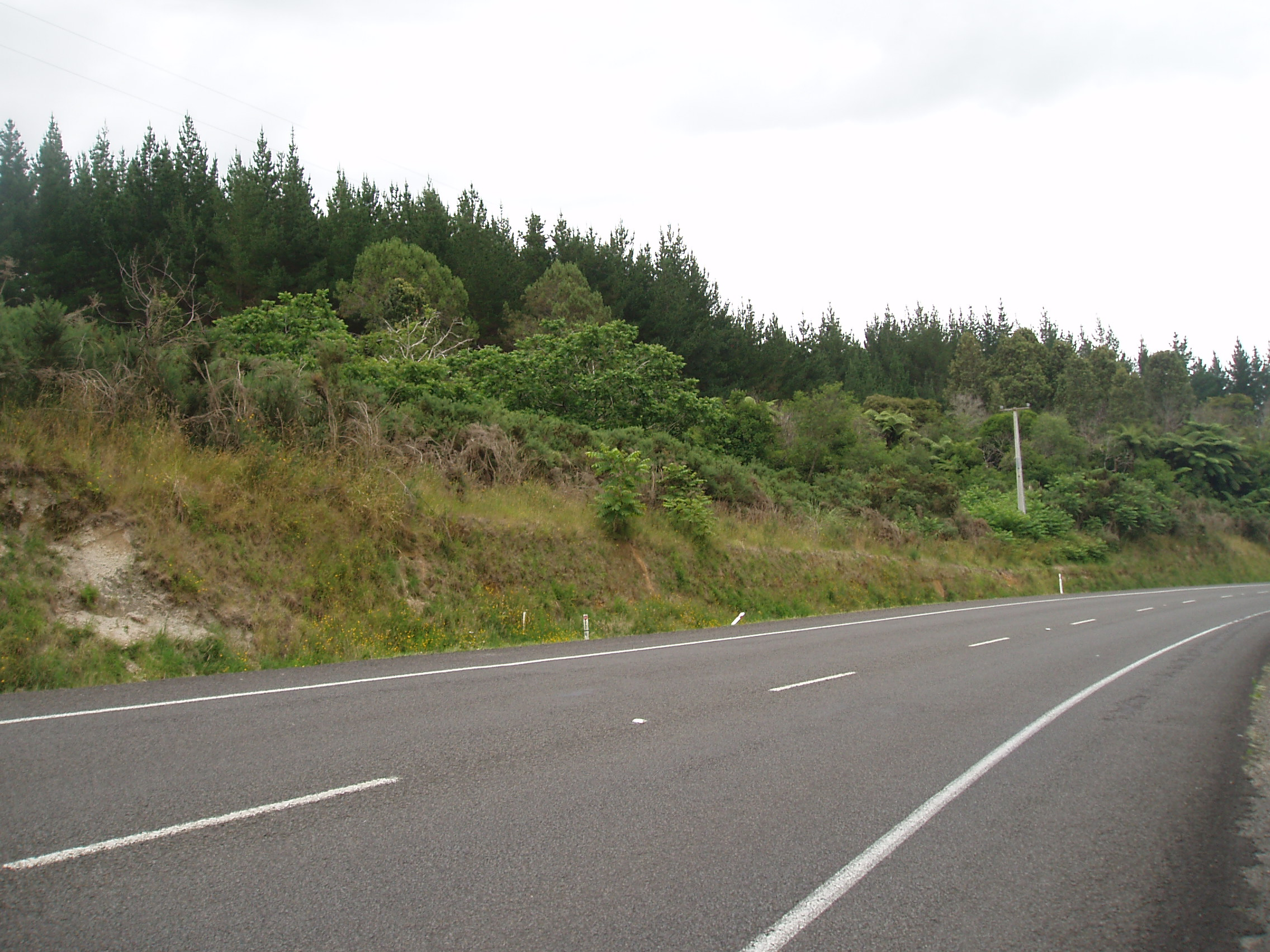
- State Highway 33 between Paengaroa and Okere Falls

Route information
- Maintained by NZ Transport Agency Waka Kotahi
- Length: 35.6 km (22.1 mi)

Major junctions
- South end: SH 30 (Te Ngae Road) at Tikitere
- North end: SH 2 (Tauranga Eastern Link) at Paengaroa

Location
- Country: New Zealand

Highway system
- New Zealand state highways; Motorways and expressways; List
← SH 32	→ SH 34

State Highway 33 (SH 33) is a New Zealand state highway in the Bay of Plenty in the North Island. It is one of two state highways (along with SH 36) that form a north–south connection between the cities of Tauranga and Rotorua, SH 33 being the most easterly of the two.

== Route description ==
State Highway 33 begins approximately 10 kilometres (6.2 mi) east of Rotorua at Tikitere, at a roundabout with the Roturua—Whakatāne section of SH 30. It heads to the north, passing between Lake Rotorua on the west and Lake Rotoiti and Okere Falls on the east. The route then continues north, mostly through hillside, before reaching Paengaroa. SH 30 terminates 2 kilometres (1.2 mi) to the north of Paengaroa at a roundabout with SH 2, with the tolled Tauranga Eastern Link (part of SH 2) completing the route to Tauranga and the former SH 2 route through Te Puke providing an untolled alternative.

The route is roughly equivalent to the pre-European Te Kaharoa-a-Taunga trail, which was cut by Taunga, Ruaeo, Tuarotorua, Marapunganui, and Kawatutu when they went inland from Maketu, shortly after arriving from Hawaiki on the Arawa and Pukateawainui canoes.

== See also ==
- List of New Zealand state highways
