= State Highway 30 (New Zealand) =

Road in New Zealand

State Highway 30

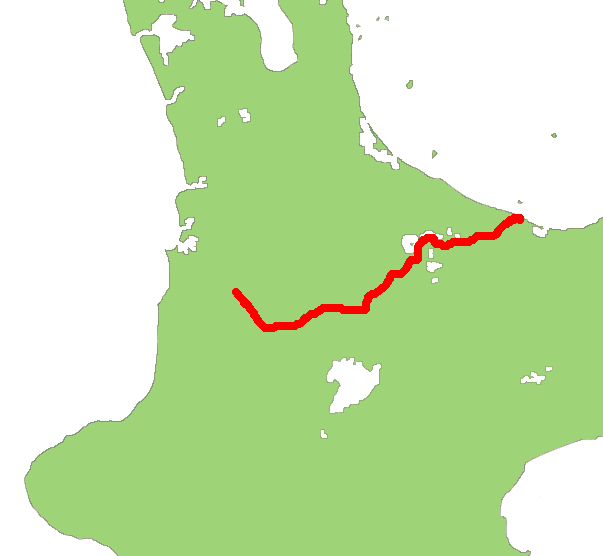

Route information
- Maintained by NZ Transport Agency Waka Kotahi
- Length: 219 km (136 mi)
- Tourist routes: Thermal Explorer Highway in concurrency with SH 5 Pacific Coast Highway; Paroa to Whakatāne

Major junctions
- Southwest end: SH 3 (Carroll Street/Awakino Road) at Te Kūiti
- SH 32 south (Tihoi Road) at Whakamaru; SH 32 north (Whakamaru Road) near Whakamaru; SH 1 south at Ātiamuri; SH 1 north at Upper Ātiamuri; SH 5 south in Rotorua; SH 5 north (Old Taupo Road) in Rotorua; SH 33 at Tikitere; SH 34 north (Kawerau Road West) near Kawerau; SH 34 (Military Road/Kawerau Road) near Te Teko; SH 2 north in Awakeri; SH 2 south in Awakeri
- Northeast end: Landing Road in Whakatāne

Location
- Country: New Zealand
- Primary destinations: Mangakino, Ātiamuri, Rotorua, Awakeri

Highway system
- New Zealand state highways; Motorways and expressways; List
← SH 29	→ SH 31

State Highway 30 (SH 30) is a New Zealand state highway, linking the Waikato and Bay of Plenty towns of Te Kūiti, Mangakino, Rotorua, and Whakatāne.

At 219 kilometres, SH 30 is New Zealand's fifth longest provincial (two-digit) state highway, after SH 25, SH 35, SH 73, and SH 94. With the exception of SH 4, it has junctions with every national (one-digit) state highway in the North Island.

SH 30 has the most concurrencies of all the state highways. It shares sections with, from west to east, SH 32, SH 1, SH 5, SH 34 (albeit briefly), and SH 2.

== Route ==
SH 30 starts in the southern end of the Waikato town of Te Kūiti at an intersection with SH 3. At first, SH 30 follows the North Island Main Trunk railway south-east as far as Benneydale. The highway then leaves the railway and turns east, crossing into Manawatū-Whanganui briefly as it passes through the Pureora Forest Park. The road now turns north-east and heads for the Waikato River.

Near Mangakino, SH 30 turns sharply south-east, and bypasses the town of Mangakino. Here, the highway meets the Waikato River at the top of Lake Maraetai, and follows the river upstream to Whakamaru, where the concurrency with SH 32 begins. It crosses the Waikato on top of the Whakamaru hydroelectric dam and leaves SH 32 where it continues eastwards on the opposite bank of the Waikato River to SH 1 at the Ātiamuri Dam. SH 30 runs concurrently with SH 1 northwards for six kilometres. The highway leaves SH 1 at Upper Ātiamuri, and heads north-east, over the border into Bay of Plenty, towards the tourist town of Rotorua.

The highway passes through the south-east of Rotorua, then heads north through the suburb of Te Ngae, and up the eastern side of Lake Rotorua. Turning east, the road skims the southern edge of Lakes Rotoiti, Rotoehu, and Rotomā. The road turns north-east passing north of the mill town of Kawerau, and through Te Teko, across the Rangitaiki River, to Awakeri.

After crossing SH 2 at Awakeri, the highway turns north and heads towards the coast. The road then turns east, and crosses the Whakatāne River. The highway ends just across the river at the roundabout with Landing Road.

== Route changes ==
SH 30's only major route change has occurred at the Whakatāne end of the highway. The highway originally ended at Paroa, where the highway met SH 2. When SH 2 was moved inland, SH 30 was extended along SH 2's former route to Whakatāne.

== Spur sections ==
State Highway 30A
- Location: SH 5 west of central Rotorua – SH 30 at Ngapuna
- Length: 3.6 km (2.2 mi)

SH 30 has one spur route – State Highway 30A (SH 30A) in Rotorua.

SH 30A starts west of central Rotorua, at the intersection of Old Taupo Road (SH 5) and Pukuatua Street. SH 30A follows Pukuatua Street eastwards, before going into an S-bend onto Amohau Street, to avoid central Rotorua. The road continues east to Fenton Street, from where SH 30A turns southwest onto a dual carriageway to connect with Te Ngae Road. The highway turns eastwards again, meeting SH 30 at the intersection of Te Ngae Road and Sala Street.

SH 30A was created after SH 5 was moved from its original route through central Rotorua to Old Taupo Road. SH 30A follows part of the old SH 5 route on Amohau Street, between Ranolf Street and Fenton Street.

== Major junctions ==
Territorial authority	Location	km	mi	Destinations	Notes
Waitomo District	Te Kūiti	0	0.0	SH 3 south (Awakino Road) – New Plymouth; SH 3 north (Carroll Street) – Waitomo Caves, Hamilton	SH 30 begins
Taupō District	Whakamaru	84	52	SH 32 south (Tihoi Road) – Taupō, Tūrangi, National Park	SH 30/SH 32 concurrency begins
Taupō District / South Waikato District boundary	Whakamaru	86	53	Whakamaru Dam (Waikato River)	
South Waikato District	Whakamaru	86	53	SH 32 north – Tokoroa, Hamilton	SH 30/SH 32 concurrency ends
South Waikato District	Ātiamuri	105	65	SH 1 south – Taupō	SH 30/SH 1 concurrency begins
South Waikato District	Upper Ātiamuri	110	68	SH 1 north – Tokoroa, Hamilton	SH 30/SH 1 concurrency ends
Rotorua Lakes	Waipa Village	143	89	SH 5 south – Taupō	SH 30/SH 5 concurrency begins
Rotorua Lakes	Whakarewarewa	144	89	SH 5 north – Hamilton	SH 30/SH 5 concurrency ends
Rotorua Lakes	Whakarewarewa	145	90	Fenton Street – City Centre	Former SH 5 route
Rotorua Lakes	Fenton Park	147	91	SH 30A (Te Ngae Road) – City Centre, Hamilton	
Rotorua Lakes	Te Ngae	157	98	SH 33 – Tauranga	
Whakatāne District	Rotoma	194	121	SH 34 – Kawerau	
Whakatāne District	Onepu	205	127	SH 34 north – Tauranga	SH 30/SH 34 concurrency begins
Whakatāne District	Onepu	206	128	SH 34 south – Kawerau	SH 30/SH 34 concurrency ends
Whakatāne District	Awakeri	218	135	SH 2 north – Tauranga	SH 30/SH 2 concurrency begins
Whakatāne District	Awakeri	219	136	SH 2 south – Ōpōtiki, Gisborne	SH 30/SH 2 concurrency ends
Whakatāne District	Whakatāne	229	142	Landing Road – Town Centre, Ōpōtiki; Hinemoa Street	SH 30 ends
Concurrency terminus

== See also ==
- List of New Zealand state highways
