= Ngāti Rangiteaorere =

Māori iwi (tribe) in Aotearoa New Zealand

- Iwi (tribe) in Māoridom
- Rohe (region): eastern shores of Lake Rotorua
- Waka (canoe): Arawa
- Population: 1,890 (2023)

Ngāti Rangiteaorere is a Māori iwi of the Te Arawa confederation of New Zealand. The iwi is based on the eastern shores of Lake Rotorua, also sharing interests with other iwi on Mokoia Island and in coastal lands near Maketu.

Te Arawa FM is the radio station of Te Arawa iwi. It was established in the early 1980s and became a charitable entity in November 1990. The station underwent a major transformation in 1993, becoming Whanau FM. One of the station's frequencies was taken over by Mai FM in 1998; the other became Pumanawa FM before later reverting to Te Arawa FM. It is available on 89.0 FM in Rotorua.

== See also ==
- Tikitere
- List of Māori iwi
