= Tikitere =

Rural settlement in Bay of Plenty Region, New Zealand

- Rural locality
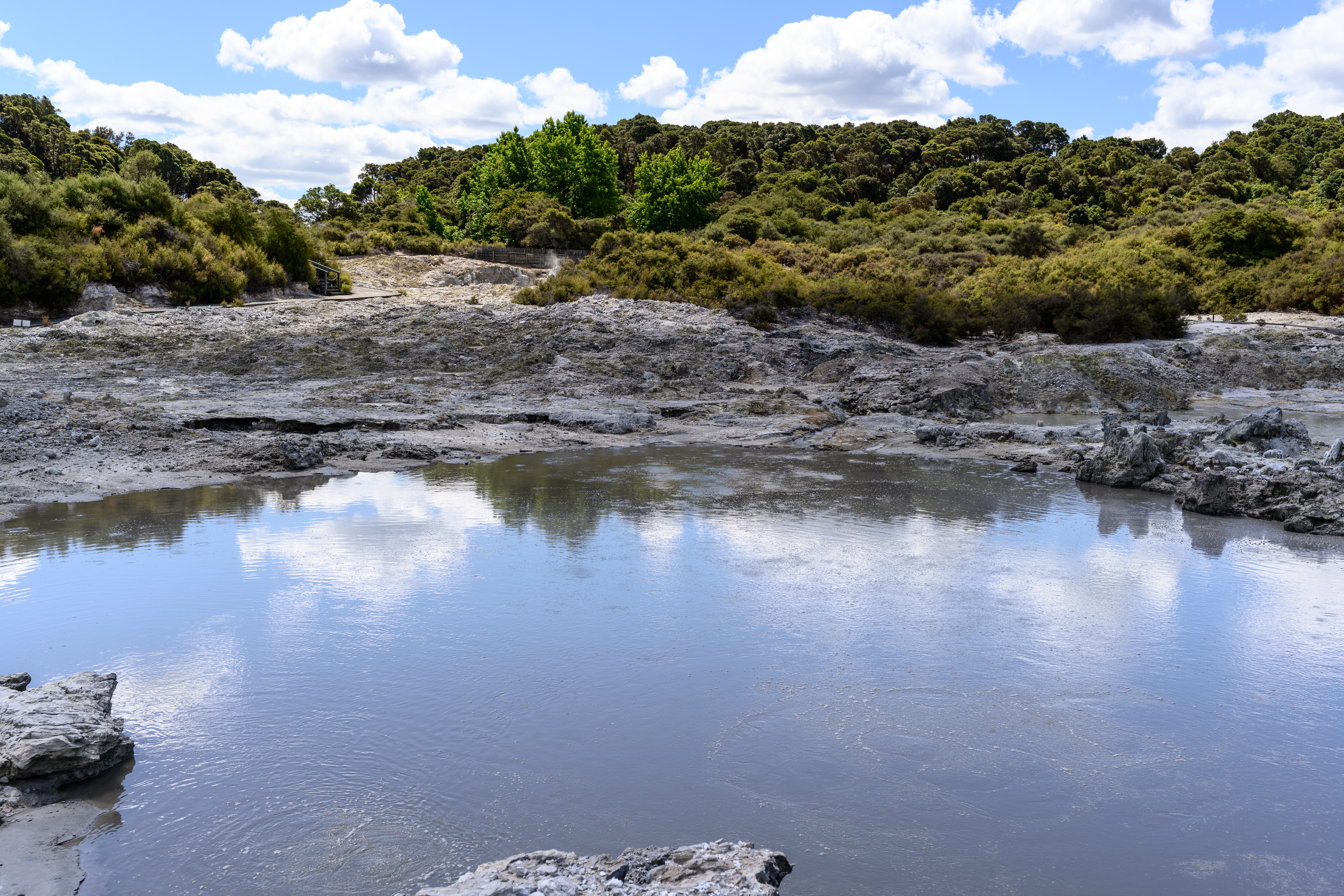
- Hot pools in 2019
- Interactive map of Tikitere
- Coordinates: 38.065°S 176.361°E
- Country: New Zealand
- Region: Bay of Plenty
- Territorial authority: Rotorua Lakes District
- Ward: Te Ipu Wai Auraki General Ward
- Community: Partly in Rotorua Lakes Community
- Electorates: Rotorua; Waiariki (Māori)

Government
  - Territorial authority: Rotorua Lakes Council
  - Regional council: Bay of Plenty Regional Council
  - Mayor of Rotorua: Tania Tapsell
  - Rotorua MP: Todd McClay
  - Waiariki MP: Rawiri Waititi

Area
  - Total: 4.24 km^{2} (1.64 sq mi)

Population (June 2025)
  - Total: 660
  - Density: 160/km^{2} (400/sq mi)
- Postcode(s): 3074

Tikitere, also known as "Hell's Gate", is a suburb in Rotorua's most active geothermal area on State Highway 30, between Lake Rotorua and Lake Rotoiti in the Bay of Plenty, New Zealand. It includes many geothermal features such as steaming lakes, mudpools, fumaroles, a mud volcano and the Kakahi Falls, the largest hot waterfall in the southern hemisphere.

The area is operated under the name "Hell’s Gate", and offers self-guided and guided tours of the geothermal park, information about its history and Māori culture, and a mud spa. It is part of the wider Tikitere-Ruahine geothermal field.

== History and culture ==
The thermal area was formed approximately 10,000 years ago in a series of geothermal eruptions that drained an ancient lake and formed the Lake Rotoiti and Lake Rotorua. The absence of the pressure of the water on top of the rock caused it to create faults from which steam and gases can escape. At less than 2 km below ground, the heat source of this thermal area is shallower than most other thermal areas in the region.

The local Māori tribe Ngāti Rangiteaorere has lived in this area for more than 700 years and remain the owner of this geothermal attraction. Tikitere, the Māori name for the area is derived from the tragic action of a Māori princess, Hurutini, the young wife of an abusive and shameful chief, who threw herself into the boiling hot pool that bears her name today. Upon finding her daughter's body floating in the hot pool, Hurutini's mother cried out a sad lament "Aue teri nei tiki" ("here lies my precious one"), which was shortened to Tikitere and became the name from the thermal reserve and the surrounding area.

"Hells Gate", its most commonly known name, was used following the visit to the geothermal reserve by noted Irish playwright, George Bernard Shaw in 1934 who likened the area to the comments that were made by his theologian colleagues back in England who were explaining to him that the result of the error of his ways as a practising atheist would result in his "going to hell". What he saw at Tikitere moved him to believe that this would be the gateway to hell. His visit to Tikitere was well received by the local Māori owners of the land and as an honour to note the occasion of his visit, the owners decided that this would be the English name for the geothermal area. A destination spa operated at this site as early as 1871, using sulphurous waters from one of the hot pools and from Kakahi Falls.

=== Marae ===
The Tikitere urban area includes Waiōhewa Marae and Rangiwhakaekeau meeting house, belonging to Ngāti Rangiteaorere.

== Demographics ==
Tikitere is described by Statistics New Zealand as a rural settlement, and covers 4.24 km^{2} (1.64 sq mi). It had an estimated population of 660 as of June 2025, with a population density of 156 people per km^{2}. Tikitere is part of the larger Waiohewa statistical area.

Historical population for Tikitere
| Year | Pop. | ±% p.a. |
|---|---|---|
| 2006 | 600 | — |
| 2013 | 675 | +1.70% |
| 2018 | 702 | +0.79% |
| 2023 | 747 | +1.25% |

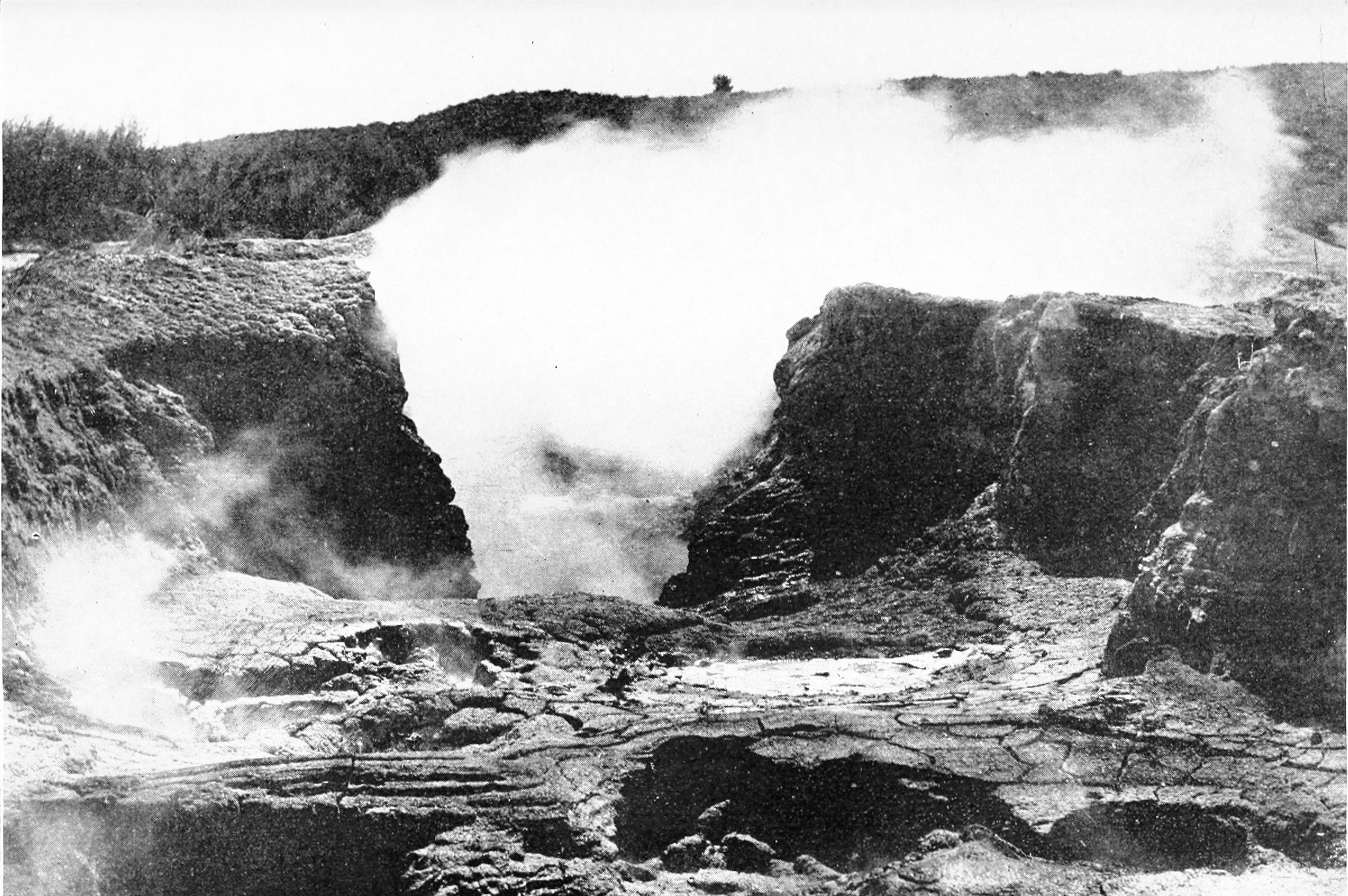
"The Inferno" at Tikitere, 1913

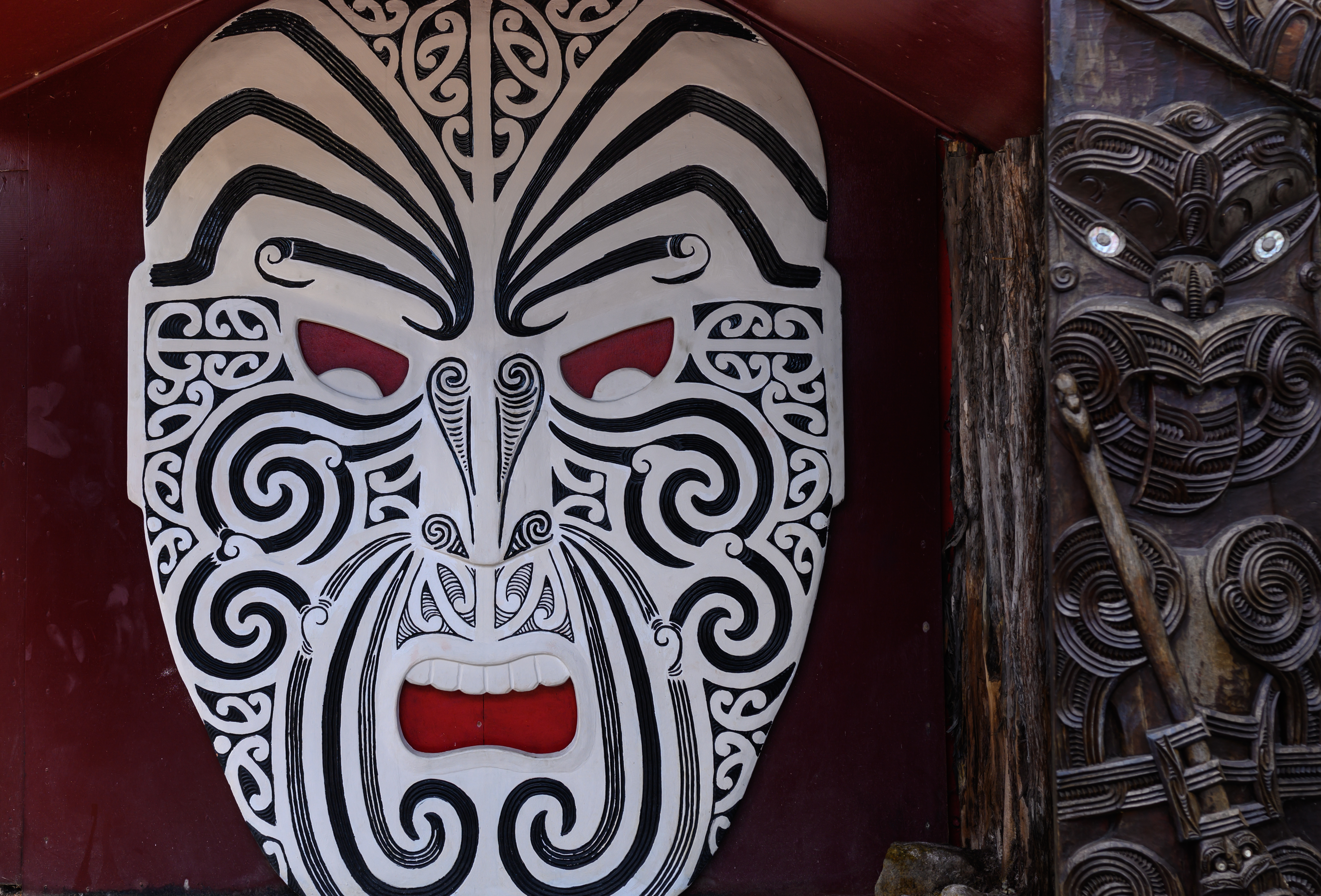
Hells gate at Tikitere, 2019

Tikitere had a population of 747 in the 2023 New Zealand census, an increase of 45 people (6.4%) since the 2018 census, and an increase of 72 people (10.7%) since the 2013 census. There were 366 males and 381 females in 249 dwellings. 2.0% of people identified as LGBTIQ+. The median age was 45.0 years (compared with 38.1 years nationally). There were 156 people (20.9%) aged under 15 years, 93 (12.4%) aged 15 to 29, 363 (48.6%) aged 30 to 64, and 135 (18.1%) aged 65 or older.

People could identify as more than one ethnicity. The results were 81.1% European (Pākehā); 30.5% Māori; 2.4% Pasifika; 8.0% Asian; 0.4% Middle Eastern, Latin American and African New Zealanders (MELAA); and 1.6% other, which includes people giving their ethnicity as "New Zealander". English was spoken by 97.6%, Māori by 7.2%, and other languages by 10.0%. No language could be spoken by 1.6% (e.g. too young to talk). New Zealand Sign Language was known by 0.4%. The percentage of people born overseas was 19.7, compared with 28.8% nationally.

Religious affiliations were 33.3% Christian, 0.8% Hindu, 0.4% Islam, 1.6% Māori religious beliefs, 0.4% Buddhist, and 1.6% other religions. People who answered that they had no religion were 53.0%, and 8.8% of people did not answer the census question.

Of those at least 15 years old, 174 (29.4%) people had a bachelor's or higher degree, 309 (52.3%) had a post-high school certificate or diploma, and 105 (17.8%) people exclusively held high school qualifications. The median income was $53,700, compared with $41,500 nationally. 135 people (22.8%) earned over $100,000 compared to 12.1% nationally. The employment status of those at least 15 was 318 (53.8%) full-time, 96 (16.2%) part-time, and 12 (2.0%) unemployed.

=== Waiohewa statistical area ===
Waiohewa covers 65.51 km^{2} (25.29 sq mi) and had an estimated population of 1,190 as of June 2025, with a population density of 18 people per km^{2}.

Historical population for Waiohewa
| Year | Pop. | ±% p.a. |
|---|---|---|
| 2006 | 891 | — |
| 2013 | 984 | +1.43% |
| 2018 | 1,038 | +1.07% |
| 2023 | 1,107 | +1.30% |
The 2006 population is for a smaller area of 63.45 km^{2}. Source:

Waiohewa had a population of 1,107 in the 2023 New Zealand census, an increase of 69 people (6.6%) since the 2018 census, and an increase of 123 people (12.5%) since the 2013 census. There were 564 males and 540 females in 366 dwellings. 2.2% of people identified as LGBTIQ+. The median age was 45.8 years (compared with 38.1 years nationally). There were 207 people (18.7%) aged under 15 years, 165 (14.9%) aged 15 to 29, 531 (48.0%) aged 30 to 64, and 204 (18.4%) aged 65 or older.

People could identify as more than one ethnicity. The results were 76.4% European (Pākehā); 35.8% Māori; 2.4% Pasifika; 6.2% Asian; 0.5% Middle Eastern, Latin American and African New Zealanders (MELAA); and 1.1% other, which includes people giving their ethnicity as "New Zealander". English was spoken by 97.6%, Māori by 10.6%, and other languages by 8.9%. No language could be spoken by 1.9% (e.g. too young to talk). New Zealand Sign Language was known by 0.3%. The percentage of people born overseas was 16.0, compared with 28.8% nationally.

Religious affiliations were 30.4% Christian, 0.5% Hindu, 0.3% Islam, 3.3% Māori religious beliefs, 0.5% Buddhist, 0.3% New Age, and 1.6% other religions. People who answered that they had no religion were 54.7%, and 8.7% of people did not answer the census question.

Of those at least 15 years old, 234 (26.0%) people had a bachelor's or higher degree, 510 (56.7%) had a post-high school certificate or diploma, and 150 (16.7%) people exclusively held high school qualifications. The median income was $49,200, compared with $41,500 nationally. 177 people (19.7%) earned over $100,000 compared to 12.1% nationally. The employment status of those at least 15 was 468 (52.0%) full-time, 147 (16.3%) part-time, and 21 (2.3%) unemployed.

== Attractions ==
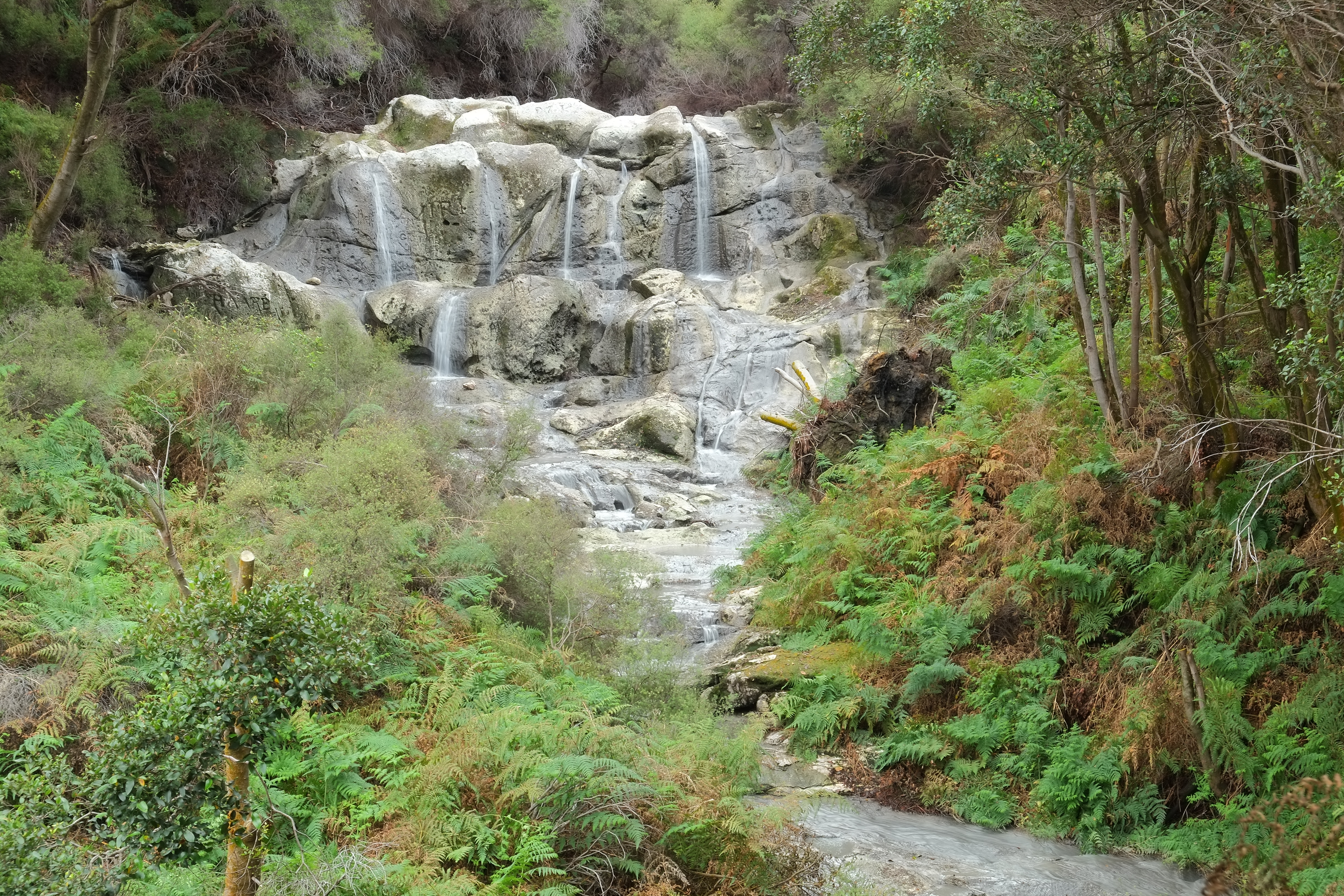
Kakahi Falls

The features of the 50 acres (20 ha) geothermal park can be explored via two easy-walking, relatively flat loop walks, taking 45 to 60 minutes in total.

The lower area is encircled by a loop walk with bridges and viewing platforms, and contains about a dozen hot pools such as "Sodom and Gomorrah" and "Devil's Bath", with depths of 15 to 25 metres. The water in the "Inferno Pools" and "Sodom and Gomorrah" reaches more than 100 °C (212 °F) due to minerals in the water elevating its boiling point. Sodom and Gomorrah, named so by Shaw, has on occasion erupted 2 metres out of its pool. Most of the other pools have temperatures of 60 to 70 °C (140 to 158 °F). The water from the Huritini hot spring is used in Hells Gate's sulphur spas. The pH level of the water in the pools is typically 3.5 to 5, with the more acidic "Ink Pots" having a pH level of 2, and the "Sulphur Bath" reaching pH 1. Several other geothermal features in this area also bear names given by Shaw.

Separating the lower and upper area is a short easy-walking bush walk along the stream flowing over the Kakahi Falls. This 4 metres tall cascade is the largest hot waterfall in the southern hemisphere and has a water temperature of around 40 °C (104 °F). The waterfall has always been a special place for local Māori, with warriors using it to cleanse themselves after battles, the sulphur in the water disinfecting wounds. The waterfall's full name is "O Te Mimi O Te Kakahi", named after a chief and noted warrior of Ngāti Rangiteaorere. The stream itself is the overflow from the upper geothermal area.

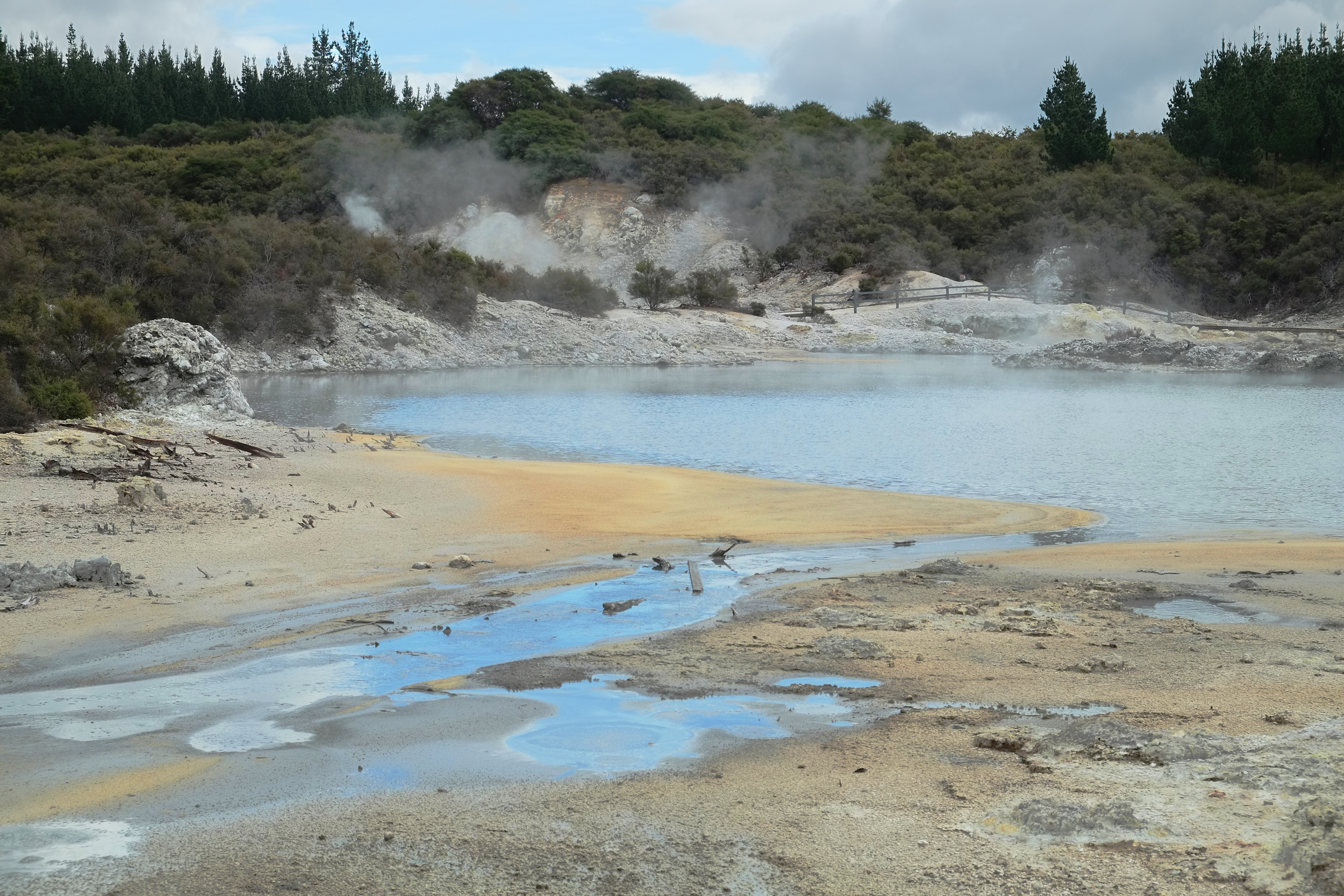
View across hot pools in upper area

A larger loop walk takes in the upper geothermal area, which contains expansive hot pools of varying activity as well as steaming fumaroles. Sulphur crystals can be observed in some parts of this area, as well as several mud cauldrons with boiling black mud. This area also contains a large mud volcano, which is currently around 2 metres tall. Mud typically bubbles violently in the crater of the volcano, but the mud volcano hardens roughly every 6 weeks. A mud eruption follows pressure build-up over 2–3 days, splattering mud over 2 metres around the volcano.

The Steaming Cliffs pool has the highest temperature of all pools in this geothermal area at 122 °C (252 °F) at the surface. Other pools in the upper area range from around 40 to 90 °C (104 to 194 °F) and were traditionally used for cooking, and medicinal purposes such as treating skin diseases and arthritis. The grey mud and water from one of the pools is used in Hells Gate's mud spa.

Hells Gate's mud spa, adjacent to the entrance, offers mud footpools and several mud baths, and a list of mud packages, therapies and massages. Mud-based beauty products available at the on-site shop. Hells Gate also offers educational programmes for schools.

Wonderworld aMAZEment Park reopened Rotorua's iconic 3D Maze in 2022, after challenges caused by COVID-19. Based in Tikitere, the attraction has 1.7 kilometres (1.1 mi) of pathways in the 3D Maze, and an extension opened in November 2024 by Rotorua Mayor Tania Tapsell containing new mazes, puzzles and giant games. Wonderworld also offers educational programmes for schools.

== Education ==
Te Kura Kaupapa Māori o Ruamata is a co-educational state Kura kaupapa Māori for Year 1 to 13 students, with a roll of 282 as of July 2026. It opened in 1987.

== Scientific study ==
=== Geology ===
The Tikitere-Ruahine geothermal field is part of the Rotorua Volcanic Centre and has a surface area of 10 km^{2} (3.9 sq mi) characterised by acid springs, pools and lakelets, fumaroles, hydrothermal explosion craters, hot barren and altered ground and mudpools. Its heat flow is 120 MW (160,000 hp). The hydrothermal products are a result of acid sulfate condensate after water interaction with rhyolitic, tuff-rich, volcanic substrate which leaves silica residue rather than the similar appearing silica sinters, that precipitate from hot, near-neutral, alkali chloride water in most other geothermal areas. In this area the Rotorua Caldera rim is ill-defined as the geothermal area is located on the tectonically subsiding Tikitere Graben.

=== Biology ===
The acid waters are known to harbour extremophile bacteria and distinct strains of the OP10 phylogenetic candidate bacterial division have been partially characterised from Tikitere.
