= State Highway 34 (New Zealand) =

Road in New Zealand

State Highway 34

Route information
- Maintained by NZ Transport Agency Waka Kotahi
- Length: 25.2 km (15.7 mi)

Major junctions
- Northeast end: SH 2 near Edgecumbe
- SH 30 near Te Teko
- Southwest end: SH 30 near Kawerau

Location
- Country: New Zealand
- Primary destinations: Kawerau

Highway system
- New Zealand state highways; Motorways and expressways; List
← SH 33	→ SH 35

State Highway 34 (SH 34) is a New Zealand state highway in the Bay of Plenty region in the North Island. It links the forestry town of Kawerau to Tauranga, Rotorua and Whakatāne.

== Route description ==
SH 34 begins at SH 2 just west of Edgecumbe. SH 34 travels south on Awaiti South Road and Hallett Road. It reaches SH 30 where it shares a short concurrency, turning left then immediately right. SH 34 then travels south-west through the northern outskirts of Kawerau and past the Tasman Pulp and Paper Mill. It continues westwards until it intersects SH 30 again and terminates. The highway was gazetted in the early 1990s.

== See also ==
- List of New Zealand state highways
