= State Highway 41 (New Zealand) =

Road in New Zealand

State Highway 41

Route information
- Maintained by NZ Transport Agency Waka Kotahi
- Length: 58.4 km (36.3 mi)

Major junctions
- West end: SH 4 (Totara Street) at Taumarunui
- SH 32 (Western Bay Road) at Kuratau; SH 47 (Te Ponanga Saddle Road) at Tokaanu
- East end: SH 1 at Tūrangi

Location
- Country: New Zealand
- Primary destinations: Tokaanu

Highway system
- New Zealand state highways; Motorways and expressways; List
← SH 40	→ SH 43

State Highway 41 (SH 41) is a New Zealand state highway in the central North Island that runs from Manunui, just south of Taumarunui on SH 4 to Tūrangi just north of the Desert Road. It comprises part of the western bypass of Lake Taupō along with SH 32.

== Route ==
From Taumarunui, SH 41 runs west through farmland, crossing the Whanganui River before entering bushland and climbing north-west onto the Central Plateau. Eventually the highway turns south-west and crosses the Manawatū-Whanganui/Waikato regional boundary. At Kuratau Junction, there is an intersection with SH 32, which continues north to Tokoroa. SH 41 turns south and runs above Lake Taupō, passing Omori and Kuratau. At Waihi Village, the road descends to the lake, and passes through Tokaanu, a hydrothermal village with hot springs. South of the tailrace bridge, there is a T-intersection with SH 47 east to Ruapehu and National Park. The highway enters Turangi and skirts the southern edge before ending on SH 1.

== See also ==
- List of New Zealand state highways
