= State Highway 40 (New Zealand) =

Road in New Zealand

State Highway 40

Route information
- Maintained by New Plymouth District Council, Ruapehu District Council
- Length: 89 km (55 mi)

Major junctions
- West end: Ahititi
- East end: Mangatupoto

Location
- Country: New Zealand
- Primary destinations: Okau, Kotara, Waitaanga, Ōhura, Nihonihu, Matiere, Tuhua, Ongarue Electric Substation

Highway system
- New Zealand state highways; Motorways and expressways; List
← SH 39	→ SH 41

State Highway 40 was part of the New Zealand state highway network before it was revoked in 1991–92.

== Route ==
SH 40 left SH 3 at the small locality of Ahititi, north of New Plymouth. The route follows the Tongaporutu River and its tributaries, passing through the high King Country hills and the locality of Kotare. After Waitaanga, the road passes over the Waitaanga saddle and enters the Ōhura River valley. At Ōhura, old SH 43 intersects with SH 40 at a TOTSO junction. It follows the Stratford to Okahukura Line along with the Ōhura River until Tuhua, after passing through Nihoniho and Matiere. From Tuhua, the road runs alongside the river and a major electricity pylon line past the Ongarue Substation until the intersection with SH 4 at Mangatupoto.

== See also ==
- List of New Zealand state highways
