= State Highway 32 (New Zealand) =

Road in New Zealand

State Highway 32

Route information
- Maintained by NZ Transport Agency Waka Kotahi
- Length: 95.9 km (59.6 mi)

Major junctions
- North end: SH 1 (Main Road) at Tokoroa
- SH 30 east (Ongaroto Road) near Whakamaru; SH 30 west (Whakamaru Road) in Whakamaru
- South end: SH 41 at Kuratau

Location
- Country: New Zealand

Highway system
- New Zealand state highways; Motorways and expressways; List
← SH 31	→ SH 33

State Highway 32 (SH 32) is a New Zealand state highway in the Central North Island. It forms part of a western traverse of Lake Taupō and a less busy alternative to SH 1, avoiding Taupō.

== Route description ==
The route begins at SH 1 in Tokoroa and travels west along Maraetai Road, leaving Tokoroa where the road angles in a more southerly direction through the Kinleith Forest. It eventually meets SH 30 at a three way junction. From here both SH 32 and SH 30 share a short concurrency of 1.4 kilometres (0.87 mi), crossing the Waikato River over the Whakamaru Dam. Shortly after reaching the locality of Whakamaru, SH 32 leaves the concurrency and continues south. The highway continues for the remaining 67 kilometres (42 mi) until it reaches Kuratau Junction and terminates with SH 41. From there, motorists can continue eastbound to reach SH 1 and complete the alternative north–south route.

== Major intersections ==
Territorial authority	Location	km	mi	Destinations	Notes
South Waikato District	Tokoroa	0.0	0.0	SH 1 north – Putāruru, Hamilton; SH 1 south – Taupō	SH 32 begins
South Waikato District	Whakamaru	27.8	17.3	SH 30 east – Ātiamuri, Rotorua	SH 32/SH 30 concurrency begins
South Waikato District / Taupō District boundary	Whakamaru	28.0	17.4	Whakamaru Dam (Waikato River)	
Taupō District	Whakamaru	29.1	18.1	SH 30 west – Mangakino, Te Kūiti	SH 32/SH 30 concurrency ends
Taupō District	Kuratau	95.9	59.6	SH 41 west – Taumarunui; SH 41 east – Tūrangi, National Park	SH 32 ends
Concurrency terminus

== History ==
SH 32, when first established, consisted of only the 67-kilometre (42 mi) section between SH 30 and SH 41. In 1995, the highway was extended to Tokoroa. For many years it was the longest highway not to have a major junction with any of the single digit state highways.

== See also ==
- List of New Zealand state highways
