= Tauranga Eastern Link =

Motorway in New Zealand

Tauranga Eastern Link
- State Highway 2

Route information
- Maintained by NZ Transport Agency
- Length: 23 km (14 mi)

Major junctions
- From: Te Maunga
- To: Paengaroa

Location
- Country: New Zealand
- Major cities: Tauranga

Highway system
- New Zealand state highways; Motorways and expressways; List

The Tauranga Eastern Link (TEL) is a four lane motorway in the Bay of Plenty region in New Zealand, covering 23 km from Te Maunga junction in Tauranga to Paengaroa. It was officially opened on 30 July 2015. It replaced a section of State Highway 2, improving access to Tauranga from the east (Te Puke, Whakatāne, Ōpōtiki, Gisborne) and south (Rotorua and Taupō). It became the main route for trucks heading to the Port of Tauranga from Rotorua and the eastern Bay of Plenty, and connected the Central Plateau forestry industry with the port to facilitate lumber export.

== Design ==
The Tauranga Eastern Link is a four lane, dual carriageway, providing a safer and more direct route between Tauranga to Paengaroa.

- Central median barrier.
- New intersections for Sandhurst Drive, Domain Road and Paengaroa junction (SH 2/SH 33).
- New overbridge for Parton and underpass for Maketu Roads.
- Urban design incorporating extensive landscaping.
- Electronic free-flow tolling system.

== Objectives ==
- Support the managed growth for the area;
- Improve efficiency and contribute to economic development through improved travel time;
- Provide a more direct route to the Port of Tauranga;
- Provide a safer route between Tauranga and Paengaroa.

Construction of the Tauranga Eastern Link officially started on 19 November 2010 and was due for completion in 2016, however construction ran six months ahead of schedule and the project was officially opened in late July 2015.

Tolling received significant community support (92% both conditional and unconditional) and as a result the NZTA submitted a tolling proposal to the Cabinet who approved it.

== Route ==
The Tauranga Eastern Link begins at the Te Maunga Roundabout in Tauranga and follows the route of the existing SH 2 to Domain Road, with junctions at Sandhurst Road /Mangatawa Road and Domain Road/Tara Road. The route then runs across rural land, parallel to Tara Road, before crossing Parton Road and running along the sandhills to the Kaituna River. At this point the highway crosses the river on a 150-metre-long (490 ft) bridge and runs past the Kaituna Wildlife Management Reserve. It then heads south east across dairy farms and orchards before crossing the railway line and terminating at a roundabout, intersecting SH 33, north of Paengaroa.

Since official opening in August 2015, the Tauranga Eastern Link has been a tolled highway.

In December 2017 it became the first of three sections of highway in New Zealand to be given a speed limit of 110 km/h.

== Exit list ==
Territorial authority	Location	Exit	Destination	Notes
Tauranga	Te Maunga		SH 2 north (Maunganui Road) – Tauranga, Mount Maunganui; SH 29A	Tauranga Eastern Link begins
Tauranga	Mangatawa		Sandhurst Drive – Papamoa; Mangatawa Lane	
Tauranga	Papamoa		Domain Road / Tara Road – Papamoa, Papamoa East; Te Puke Highway – Te Puke	
Western Bay of Plenty
Western Bay of Plenty	Paengaroa		SH 2 south – Whakatāne; SH 33 – Rotorua; Te Puke Highway – Te Puke	Tauranga Eastern Link ends
