= Whakamaru =

Settlement in Waikato, New Zealand

- Interactive map of Whakamaru
- Coordinates: 38.42°S 175.80°E
- Country: New Zealand
- Region: Waikato region
- District: Taupō District
- Ward: Mangakino-Pouakani Ward
- Electorates: Taupō; Te Tai Hauāuru (Māori)

Government
  - Territorial Authority: Taupō District Council
  - Regional council: Waikato Regional Council
  - Mayor of Taupō: John Funnell
  - Taupō MP: Louise Upston
  - Hauraki-Waikato MP: Hana-Rawhiti Maipi-Clarke

Area
  - Total: 1.60 km^{2} (0.62 sq mi)

Population (June 2025)
  - Total: 200
  - Density: 120/km^{2} (320/sq mi)

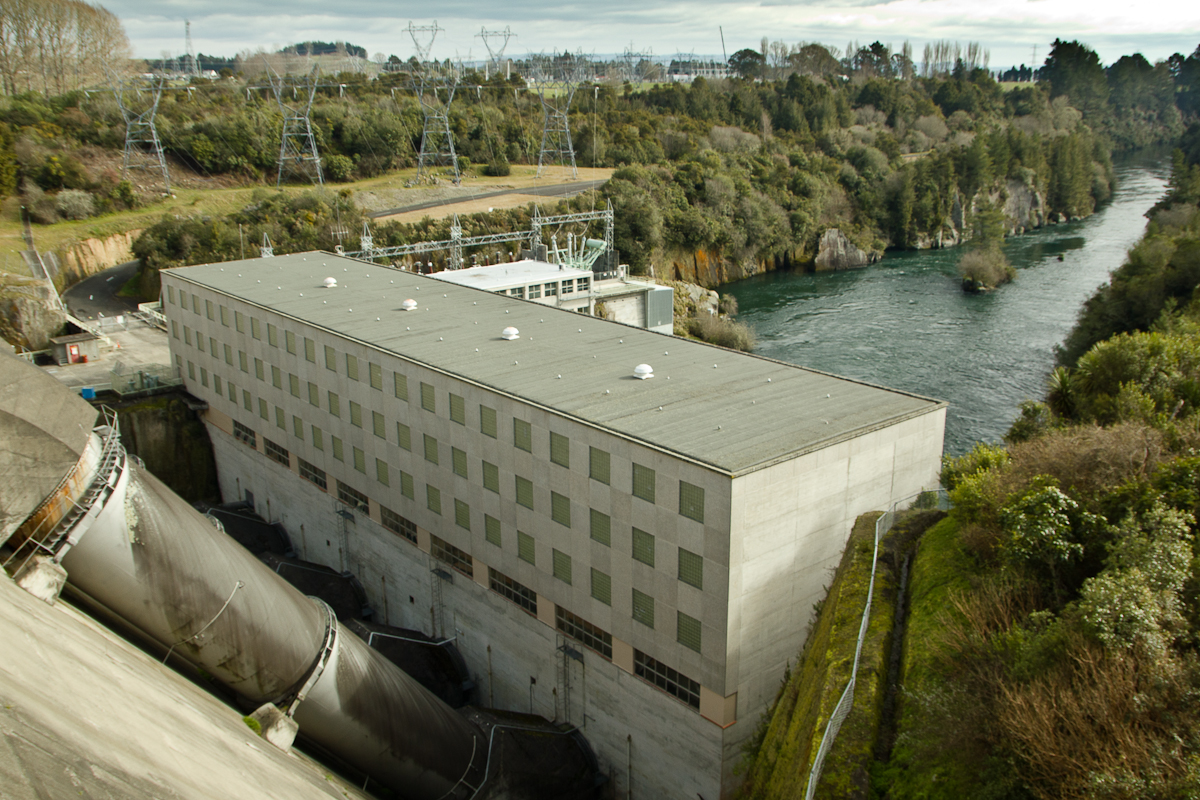
The Whakamaru dam power station, a major part of the power product in New Zealand

Whakamaru /ˈfɑːkəˌmɑːruː/ is a town in the central region of the North Island of New Zealand. The town is adjacent to a hydroelectric power station on the Waikato River, and electricity transmission infrastructure that serves the North Island national grid.

== History ==
The Whakamaru supervolcano eruption occurred 320,000–340,000 years ago and is the largest known eruption in the Taupō Volcanic Zone. The town is located in the resulting Whakamaru Caldera.

The Māori word whakamaru means 'to shelter' or 'to protect'. The name is a shortened version of Te Whakamarumarutanga o Kahukeke ("The Shelter of Kahukeke"). According to Waikato Tainui oral traditions, Kahukeke, the Māori healer and explorer, who had arrived in New Zealand on the Tainui migratory canoe fell ill at the spot and the area was named for the shelter where she recovered. In some versions the shelter was built by her husband Rakatāura / Hape, the tohunga of the Tainui.

The town of Whakamaru was originally established as accommodation for the Whakamaru Power Station. The first 220 kV transmission lines in New Zealand were constructed from Maraetai to Whakamaru, and from Whakamaru to Ōtāhuhu. These lines were commissioned in October 1952, making Whakamaru a key node on the North Island grid. In 1964, following the commissioning of the HVDC Inter-Island link, the North Island Control Centre for the national grid was transferred from Claudelands to a new facility at Whakamaru. This control centre remained in service until 1993 when a replacement was commissioned at Hamilton.

== Demographics ==
Statistics New Zealand describes Whakamaru as a rural settlement, which covers 1.60 km^{2} (0.62 sq mi). It had an estimated population of 200 as of June 2025, with a population density of 125 people per km^{2}. The settlement is part of the larger Marotiri statistical area.

Historical population
Year	Pop.	±% p.a.
2006	168	—
2013	162	−0.52%
2018	168	+0.73%
2023	192	+2.71%

Whakamaru had a population of 192 in the 2023 New Zealand census, an increase of 24 people (14.3%) since the 2018 census, and an increase of 30 people (18.5%) since the 2013 census. There were 96 males and 96 females in 69 dwellings. 1.6% of people identified as LGBTIQ+. The median age was 50.8 years (compared with 38.1 years nationally). There were 36 people (18.8%) aged under 15 years, 24 (12.5%) aged 15 to 29, 90 (46.9%) aged 30 to 64, and 42 (21.9%) aged 65 or older.

People could identify as more than one ethnicity. The results were 71.9% European (Pākehā), 37.5% Māori, 12.5% Pasifika, and 4.7% Asian. English was spoken by 98.4%, Māori by 9.4%, and other languages by 7.8%. No language could be spoken by 1.6% (e.g. too young to talk). The percentage of people born overseas was 12.5, compared with 28.8% nationally.

Religious affiliations were 18.8% Christian, 1.6% Hindu, 1.6% Māori religious beliefs, and 1.6% New Age. People who answered that they had no religion were 68.8%, and 9.4% of people did not answer the census question.

Of those at least 15 years old, 15 (9.6%) people had a bachelor's or higher degree, 93 (59.6%) had a post-high school certificate or diploma, and 51 (32.7%) people exclusively held high school qualifications. The median income was $33,000, compared with $41,500 nationally. 9 people (5.8%) earned over $100,000 compared to 12.1% nationally. The employment status of those at least 15 was 69 (44.2%) full-time, 18 (11.5%) part-time, and 6 (3.8%) unemployed.

== Recreation and amenities ==
During the summer months Lake Whakamaru is used extensively for water skiing. The Whakamaru Water Ski Club is very busy during the Christmas holidays, although water skiing courses are normally available all year round. Kiwiburn, the New Zealand Burning Man regional, was held annually at the Whakamaru Domain, State Highway 30, from 2007 to 2013.

The town has a resident association, grocery store, cafe, pizza restaurant, and petrol station. Guided walks are available for the nearby Mt Titiraupenga, located at the geographic centre of The North Island.

== Education ==
Whakamaru School is a co-educational state primary school, with a roll of 75 as of March 2026. It opened in 1959.
