= Paengaroa =

Town in the Bay of Plenty, New Zealand

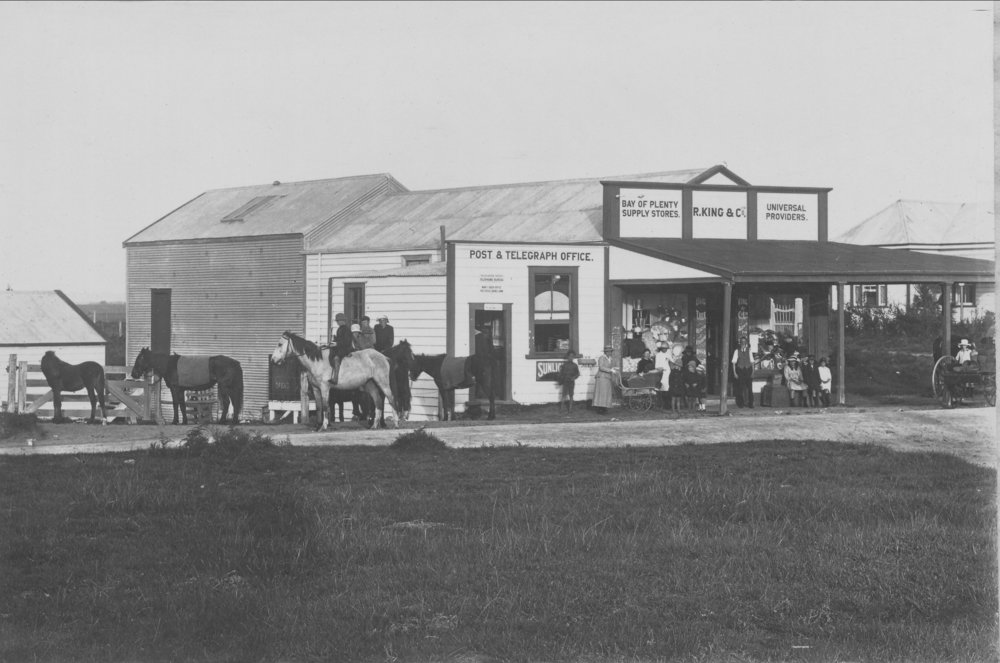
- Paengaroa in 1911
- Interactive map of Paengaroa
- Coordinates: 37.8224°S 176.4114°E
- Country: New Zealand
- Region: Bay of Plenty
- Territorial authority: Western Bay of Plenty
- Ward: Maketu-Te Puke Ward
- Established: pre-European
- Electorates: East Cape; Waiariki (Māori)

Government
  - Territorial authority: Western Bay of Plenty District Council
  - Regional council: Bay of Plenty Regional Council
  - Mayor of Western Bay of Plenty: James Denyer
  - East Cape MP: Dana Kirkpatrick
  - Waiariki MP: Rawiri Waititi

Area
  - Total: 1.52 km^{2} (0.59 sq mi)
- Elevation: 27 m (89 ft)

Population (June 2025)
  - Total: 940
  - Density: 620/km^{2} (1,600/sq mi)
- Time zone: UTC+12 (NZST)
  - Summer (DST): UTC+13 (NZDT)
- Postcode: 3189
- Area code: 07

Paengaroa is a village in the Bay of Plenty, New Zealand. It is 9 km (5.6 mi) from Maketu, 11 km (6.8 mi) from Te Puke, 35 km (22 mi) from Tauranga and 46 kilometres (29 mi) from Rotorua.

Paengaroa is located on State Highway 33 approximately 2 km from the junction with State Highway 2, and at the eastern end of the Tauranga Eastern Motorway (TEL), which was opened in 2015.

Paengaroa is a largely rural settlement with many farms and a few shops. Some residents also commute to Tauranga. It has 2.27 hectares of commercial land.

== Demographics ==
Paengaroa is described by Statistics New Zealand as a rural settlement, which covers 1.52 km^{2} (0.59 sq mi). It had an estimated population of 940 as of June 2025, with a population density of 618 people per km^{2}. It is part of the larger Pongakawa statistical area.

Historical population
Year	Pop.	±% p.a.
2006	624	—
2013	654	+0.67%
2018	795	+3.98%
2023	879	+2.03%

Paengaroa had a population of 879 in the 2023 New Zealand census, an increase of 84 people (10.6%) since the 2018 census, and an increase of 225 people (34.4%) since the 2013 census. There were 453 males, 423 females, and 3 people of other genders in 279 dwellings. 1.7% of people identified as LGBTIQ+. The median age was 34.1 years (compared with 38.1 years nationally). There were 225 people (25.6%) aged under 15 years, 162 (18.4%) aged 15 to 29, 378 (43.0%) aged 30 to 64, and 117 (13.3%) aged 65 or older.

People could identify as more than one ethnicity. The results were 78.5% European (Pākehā); 34.1% Māori; 2.0% Pasifika; 4.8% Asian; 1.0% Middle Eastern, Latin American and African New Zealanders (MELAA); and 2.0% other, which includes people giving their ethnicity as "New Zealander". English was spoken by 95.2%, Māori by 8.5%, Samoan by 0.3%, and other languages by 4.8%. No language could be spoken by 2.4% (e.g. too young to talk). New Zealand Sign Language was known by 0.3%. The percentage of people born overseas was 11.6, compared with 28.8% nationally.

Religious affiliations were 19.5% Christian, 1.0% Hindu, 2.7% Māori religious beliefs, 0.3% Buddhist, 1.0% New Age, and 1.7% other religions. People who answered that they had no religion were 64.5%, and 8.9% of people did not answer the census question.

Of those at least 15 years old, 75 (11.5%) people had a bachelor's or higher degree, 375 (57.3%) had a post-high school certificate or diploma, and 204 (31.2%) people exclusively held high school qualifications. The median income was $38,100, compared with $41,500 nationally. 42 people (6.4%) earned over $100,000 compared to 12.1% nationally. The employment status of those at least 15 was 351 (53.7%) full-time, 78 (11.9%) part-time, and 12 (1.8%) unemployed.

== Notable people from Paengaroa ==
- Kiri Allan (born 1984), Member of Parliament for the East Coast electorate and former Minister of Justice

== Education ==
Paengaroa School is a co-educational state primary school for Year 1 to 6 students. It was founded in 1906, and has a roll of 199 as of July 2026.
