= List of major junctions on New Zealand State Highway 1 =

The following is a list of major junctions on New Zealand's State Highway 1 (SH 1).

== North Island (SH 1N) ==
Territorial authority	Location	km	mi	Exit	Name	Destinations	Notes
Far North District	Cape Reinga	0	0.0				SH 1 begins 34°25′45″S 172°40′54″E
Far North District	Awanui	104	65			SH 10 – Doubtless Bay, Bay of Islands	SH 1/Twin Coast Discovery Highway concurrency begins. Originally the start of SH 1. The highway north of here was SH 1F.
Far North District	Kaitaia	112	70			Twin Coast Discovery Highway (South Road) – Town Centre, Ahipara	SH 1/Twin Coast Discovery Highway concurrency ends
Far North District	Ōkaihau	184	114			SH 15 south (Te Pua Road) – Kaikohe, Maungatapere	
Far North District	Ōhaeawai	190	120			SH 12 – Kaikohe, Dargaville	
Far North District	Pakaraka	198	123			SH 10 – Kerikeri, Bay of Islands, Doubtless Bay	
Far North District	Kawakawa	211	131			SH 11 – Bay of Islands, Paihia	SH 1/Twin Coast Discovery Highway concurrency begins
Whangarei District	Whangārei	266	165			SH 14 (Maunu Road) – Dargaville	
Whangarei District	Otaika	272	169			SH 15 north (Loop Road) – Maungatapere	SH 1/SH 15 concurrency begins
Whangarei District	Ruakākā	292	181			SH 15 east (One Tree Point Road) – Marsden Point	SH 1/SH 15 concurrency ends
Whangarei District	Waipu	303	188			Twin Coast Discovery Highway (Nova Scotia Drive) – Waipu, Mangawhai Heads	SH 1/Twin Coast Discovery Highway concurrency ends
Kaipara District	Brynderwyn	319	198			SH 12 – Dargaville	SH 1/Twin Coast Discovery Highway concurrency begins
Auckland	Te Hana	339	211			Twin Coast Discovery Highway (Mangawhai Road) – Tomarata, Mangawhai	
Auckland	Wellsford	346	215			SH 16 (Port Albert Road) – Helensville, Port Albert	
Auckland	Puhoi	388	241			Twin Coast Discovery Highway – Auckland (via Waiwera)	Formerly SH 17. Toll-free route south SH 1/Twin Coast Discovery Highway concurrency ends SH 1 becomes Auckland Northern Motorway
Auckland	Puhoi	389	242	Johnstone's Hill Tunnels			
Auckland	Orewa	393	244	Toll point			
Auckland	Silverdale	398	247	398		(Hibiscus Coast Highway)	Formerly SH 17. Toll-free route north
Auckland	Albany	412	256	412		Greville Road – Browns Bay, Massey University, Albany	Formerly SH 17
Auckland	Unsworth Heights	414	257	414		SH 18 (Upper Harbour Highway) – Greenhithe, Waitakere, Mairangi Bay	
Auckland	Northcote Point	423	263	Auckland Harbour Bridge (Waitematā Harbour)			
Auckland	Auckland CBD	425	264	Victoria Park Tunnel (northbound); Victoria Park Viaduct (southbound)			
Auckland	Auckland CBD	427	265	427	Central Motorway Junction	SH 16 (Northwestern Motorway) – Port, Waitakere, Helensville	Southbound exit and northbound entrance Auckland Northern Motorway becomes Auckland Southern Motorway
Auckland	Auckland CBD	428	266	428	Central Motorway Junction	SH 16 west (Northwestern Motorway) – Waitakere, Helensville	Northbound exit and southbound entrance
Auckland	Auckland CBD	429	267	429A-B-C	Central Motorway Junction	SH 16 east (Northwestern Motorway) – Port	Northbound exit and southbound entrance
Auckland	Manukau CBD	449	279	449A-B		SH 20 (Southwestern Motorway) – Manukau, Airport	
Auckland	Drury	461	286	461		SH 22 (Karaka Road) – Drury, Pukekohe	
Auckland	Bombay	471	293	471		(Mill Road) – Bombay, Pukekohe	Auckland Southern Motorway becomes Waikato Expressway
Waikato District	Pōkeno	477	296	477		SH 2 – Tauranga, Coromandel Peninsula	37°13′49″S 175°00′57″E
Waikato District	Taupiri	527	327	—		SH 1B (Gordonton Road) – Gordonton, Cambridge	
Waikato District	Horotiu	535	332	—		SH 1C (Mangaharakeke Drive) – Hamilton City, New Plymouth	
Waikato District/Hamilton City boundary	Ruakura	552	343			SH 26 (Ruakura Road) – Ruakura, Coromandel Peninsula	
Waikato District	Tamahere	559	347			SH 1C (Cambridge Road) – Hamilton City	
Waikato District	Tamahere	561	349	—		SH 21 (Airport Road) – Tamahere, Matangi, Airport, Mystery Creek	
Waipa District	Cambridge	572	355	—		SH 1B (Victoria Road) – Cambridge, Hautapu	
Waipa District	Cambridge	577	359	—		(Tirau Road) – Cambridge, Te Awamutu	Waikato Expressway ends
Matamata-Piako District	No major junctions						
Matamata-Piako District / South Waikato District boundary	Piarere	594	369			SH 29 – Tauranga	
South Waikato District	Tīrau	605	376			SH 27 – Coromandel Peninsula, Tauranga, Matamata	
South Waikato District	Tīrau	607	377			SH 5 – Rotorua	SH 1/Thermal Explorer Highway concurrency ends 37°59′06″S 175°46′04″E
South Waikato District	Putāruru	613	381			SH 28 (Whites Road) – Rotorua, Tauranga	
South Waikato District	Tokoroa	638	396			SH 32 (Maraetai Road) – Te Kūiti	
South Waikato District	Upper Ātiamuri	657	408			SH 30 east – Rotorua, Whakatāne	SH 1/SH 30 concurrency begins
South Waikato District	Ātiamuri	663	412			SH 30 west (Ongaroto Road) – Te Kūiti	SH 1/SH 30 concurrency ends
South Waikato District / Taupō District boundary	Ātiamuri	664	413	Waikato River			
Taupō District	Wairakei	695	432			SH 5 north – Rotorua (Wairakei Drive) – Taupō	SH 1/SH 5/Thermal Explorer Highway concurrency begins 38°37′24″S 176°05′59″E
Taupō District	Taupō	696	432	Waikato River			
Taupō District	Taupō	706	439			SH 5 south (Napier Road)	SH 1/SH 5/Thermal Explorer Highway concurrency ends 38°42′16″S 176°06′43″E
Taupō District	Tūrangi	753	468			SH 41 (Tokaanu Road) – Taumarunui, National Park	
Taupō District	Rangipo	763	474			SH 46 (Lake Rotoaira Road) – National Park	Desert Road begins
Ruapehu District	Desert Road	794	493	Desert Road Summit 1,074 m (3,524 ft); 39°18′10″S 175°44′28″E			
Ruapehu District	Waiouru	815	506			SH 49 – Ohakune, National Park	Desert Road ends
Rangitikei District	Vinegar Hill	885	550			SH 54 (Vinegar Hill Road) – Feilding	
Rangitikei District	Bulls	925	575			SH 3 north (Bridge Street) – Whanganui	SH 1/SH 3 concurrency begins 40°10′28″S 175°23′04″E
Rangitikei District / Manawatū District boundary	Bulls	927	576	Rangitikei River			
Manawatū District	Sanson	931	578			SH 3 south (Dundas Road) – Palmerston North	SH 1/SH 3 concurrency ends 40°13′13″S 175°25′27″E
Horowhenua District	Foxton	966	600	Manawatū River			
Horowhenua District	Ohau	985	612			SH 57 (Kimberley Road) – Palmerston North	
Kāpiti Coast District	Peka Peka	1,012	629	—		(Peka Peka Road) – Peka Peka, Waikanae	Southbound exit and northbound entrance SH 1 becomes Kāpiti Expressway
Kāpiti Coast District	Waikanae	1,017	632	—		(Te Moana Road) – Waikanae, Waikanae Beach	
Kāpiti Coast District	Paraparaumu	1,023	636	—		(Kapiti Road) – Paraparaumu, Paraparaumu Beach	
Kāpiti Coast District	Raumati South	1,026	638	—		(Poplar Avenue) – Raumati South, Paraparaumu	Northbound exit and southbound entrance
Kāpiti Coast District	Mackays Crossing	1,030	640	—		SH 59 (Whareroa Road) – Queen Elizabeth Park	Kāpiti Expressway becomes Transmission Gully Motorway
Kāpiti Coast District	Paekākāriki	1,032	641	—		(Paekākāriki Link Road) to SH 59 (Centennial Highway) – Paekākāriki, Plimmerton	Southbound entrance and northbound exit
Kāpiti Coast District / Porirua City / Upper Hutt City tripoint	Wainui	1,035	643	Pouāwhā / Wainui Saddle 253 m (830 ft); 41°00′46″S 174°57′31″E			
Porirua City	Pāuatahanui	1,047	651	—		SH 58 (Paremata-Haywards Road) – Hutt Valley, Pāuatahanui	
Porirua City	Waitangirua	1,049	652	—		Waitangirua Link Road – Waitangirua, Whitby	
Porirua City	Cannons Creek	1,053	654	Te Ara a Toa Bridge (Cannons Creek)			
Porirua City	Kenepuru	1,056	656	—		Kenepuru Link Road – Porirua, Tawa	Southbound exit only, both northbound and southbound entrance
Wellington City	Linden	1,057	657	—		SH 59 north (Johnsonville-Porirua Motorway) - Porirua	Northbound exit and southbound entrance Transmission Gully Motorway ends, SH 1 merges on to Johnsonville-Porirua Motorway
Wellington City	Grenada North	1,060	660	—		(Takapu Road) – Redwood, Tawa, Linden, Greenacres, Grenada North	
Wellington City	Glenside	1,063	661	—		(Grenada Drive/Westchester Drive) – Glenside, Churton Park, Grenada Village	
Wellington City	Johnsonville	1,064	661	—		(Moorefield Road) – Johnsonville, Khandallah	Southbound exit and northbound entrance
Wellington City	Johnsonville	1,065	662	—		(Johnsonville Road) – Johnsonville	Northbound exit and southbound entrance Johnsonville-Porirua Motorway ends
Wellington City	Newlands	1,066	662	—		(Newlands Road) – Newlands	
Wellington City	Ngauranga	1,068	664	—	Ngauranga Interchange	SH 2 (Hutt Road) – Hutt Valley, Picton Ferry	41°14′49″S 174°48′52″E; Wellington Urban Motorway begins
Wellington City	Thorndon	1,070	660	—		(Aotea Quay) – Waterfront	Southbound exit and northbound entrance
Wellington City	Thorndon	1,071	665	—		(Murphy Street) – Thorndon	Southbound exit and northbound entrance
Wellington City	Thorndon	1,072	666	—		(Hawkestone Street) – Karori	Southbound exit and entrance
Wellington City	Thorndon	1,072	666	—		(Tinakori Road) – Thorndon	Northbound exit and entrance
Wellington City	Wellington CBD	1,073	667	—		(The Terrace) – Kelburn	Southbound exit and northbound entrance
Wellington City	Kelburn	1,074	667	Terrace Motorway Tunnel			
Wellington City	Te Aro	1,075	668			Willis Street	Wellington Urban Motorway ends
Wellington City	Te Aro	1,076	669	Arras Tunnel (northbound)			
Wellington City	Mount Victoria	1,077	669	Mount Victoria Tunnel			
Wellington City	Rongotai	1,081	672			(Broadway) – Strathmore, Seatoun (Stewart Duff Drive) – Airport	SH 1 ends 41°19′33″S 174°48′35″E
Concurrency terminus; Electronic toll collection; Incomplete access; Route transition

== South Island (SH 1S) ==
All exits are unnumbered.

Territorial authority	Location	km	mi	Destinations	Notes
Marlborough District	Picton	0	0.0	Wellington Ferry (Interislander)	SH 1 and SH 1/Classic New Zealand Wine Trail concurrency begins
Marlborough District	Picton	1	0.62	Kent Street – Wellington Ferry (Bluebridge)	
Marlborough District	Tuamarina	20	12	Wairau River	
Marlborough District	Spring Creek	23	14	SH 62 (Rapaura Road) – Nelson	
Marlborough District	Blenheim	28	17	SH 6 (Nelson Street) – Nelson, West Coast	
Marlborough District	Blenheim	29	18	Park Terrace; Redwood Street – Redwoodtown; Main Street – Town Centre; Main North Line	Rail line bisects roundabout Classic NZ Wine Trail and SH 1/Classic NZ Wine Trail concurrency ends
Marlborough District	Seddon	50	31	Awatere River	
Kaikōura District	Kowhai	163	101	Alpine Pacific Triangle (Inland Kaikōura Road) – Mt Lyford Village, Hanmer Springs	SH 1/Alpine Pacific Triangle concurrency begins
Hurunui District	Ethelton	247	153	Hurunui River; Only remaining one-lane bridge on SH 1S	
Hurunui District	Waipara	284	176	SH 7/Alpine Pacific Triangle – Hanmer Springs, West Coast via Lewis Pass	
Hurunui District	Amberley	291	181	Inland Scenic Route – Rangiora, Oxford	Alpine Pacific Triangle ends. SH 1/Alpine Pacific Triangle concurrency ends.
Waimakariri District	Pineacres	320	200	William Street	Christchurch Northern Motorway begins
Waimakariri District	Kaiapoi	323	201	SH 71 (Lineside Road) – Kaiapoi, Rangiora	
Waimakariri District / Christchurch City boundary	Chaneys	328	204	Waimakariri River	
Christchurch City	Chaneys	329	204	SH 74 (Christchurch Northern Motorway) – City Centre, Lyttelton	Southbound exit and northbound entrance Christchurch Northern Motorway diverges from SH 1, Western Belfast Bypass begins
Christchurch City	Belfast	330	210	Main North Road – Belfast, City Centre, Lyttelton	Southbound exit and northbound entrance
Christchurch City	Belfast	334	208	Johns Road – Belfast	Western Belfast Bypass ends
Christchurch City	Harewood	341	212	Memorial Avenue – Airport, Fendalton, City Centre	
Christchurch City	Masham	344	214	SH 73 east (Yaldhurst Road) – Riccarton, City Centre; SH 73 west (Yaldhurst Road) – West Coast via Arthur's Pass	
Christchurch City	Hornby	347	216	Main South Road – City Centre, Lyttelton, Akaroa	Formerly SH 73A
Selwyn District	Templeton	354	220	SH 76 north (Christchurch Southern Motorway) – Christchurch City Centre, Lyttelton	Northbound exit and southbound entrance SH 1 merges onto Christchurch Southern Motorway
Selwyn District	Rolleston	358	222	Weedons Road – Rolleston, Lincoln; Weedons Ross Road – West Melton	Christchurch Southern Motorway ends
Ashburton District	Rakaia	400	250	Rakaia Bridge (Rakaia River); Longest road bridge in New Zealand, 1.76 km (1.09 mi)	
Ashburton District	Ashburton	430	270	SH 77 (Moore Street) – Methven, Darfield	
Timaru District	Rangitata	465	289	SH 79 – Geraldine, Aoraki / Mount Cook	
Timaru District	Winchester	481	299	Inland Scenic Route, Route 72 – Geraldine, Methven, Mount Hutt	
Timaru District	Washdyke	501	311	SH 8 – Fairlie, Aoraki / Mount Cook	
Timaru District	Timaru	506	314	SH 78 (Port Loop Road) – Port of Timaru	
Waimate District	Makikihi	543	337	SH 82 – Waimate	
Waimate District / Waitaki District boundary	Glenavy	569	354	Waitaki River	
Waitaki District	Pukeuri Junction	583	362	SH 83 – Kurow, Omarama	
Waitaki District	Palmerston	651	405	SH 85 – Ranfurly, Alexandra	
Dunedin City	Dunedin Central	706	439	SH 88 (Saint Andrew Street) – Port Chalmers, Otago Peninsula	
Dunedin City	Caversham	709	441	Southern Scenic Route (Barnes Drive) – Caversham	
Dunedin City	Lookout Point	710	440	(Main South Road)	SH 1 becomes Dunedin Southern Motorway
Dunedin City	Mosgiel	720	450	SH 87 (Quarry Road) – Mosgiel	
Dunedin City	Mosgiel	721	448	(Braeside)	Dunedin Southern Motorway ends
Dunedin City	Allanton	729	453	SH 86 (Centre Road) – Airport, Outram	
Dunedin City	Allanton	736	457	Taieri River	
Clutha District	Waihola	746	464	Southern Scenic Route (North Foreland Street) – Taieri Mouth	SH 1/Southern Scenic Route concurrency begins
Clutha District	Clarksville	765	475	SH 8 – Alexandra, Queenstown	
Clutha District	Balclutha	786	488	Balclutha Bridge (Clutha River)	
Clutha District	Balclutha	787	489	Southern Scenic Route – Owaka, Invercargill via Southern Scenic Route	SH 1/Southern Scenic Route concurrency ends
Clutha District	Clinton	817	508	SH 93 – Mataura	
Gore District	McNab	854	531	SH 90 – Raes Junction, Tapanui	
Gore District	Gore	858	533	Mataura River	
Gore District	Gore	858	533	SH 94 (Hokonui Drive) – Milford Sound/Piopiotahi	
Gore District	Mataura	870	540	SH 93 – Clinton	
Gore District	Mataura	872	542	SH 96 (Glencoe Highway)	
Southland District	Dacre	900	560	SH 98 (Lorne Dacre Road) – Lorneville	Alternative route to SH 6 and SH 99, bypassing Invercargill
Invercargill City	Invercargill City Centre	922	573	Southern Scenic Route (Elles Road) – South City	SH 1/Southern Scenic Route concurrency begins
Invercargill City	Invercargill City Centre	923	574	SH 6/Southern Scenic Route (Dee Street) – Queenstown	SH 1/Southern Scenic Route concurrency ends
Invercargill City	Bluff	952	592		SH 1 ends
Concurrency terminus; Incomplete access; Route transition

== Spur sections ==
=== SH 1B ===
All exits are unnumbered.

Territorial authority	Location	km	mi	Destinations	Notes
Waikato District	Taupiri	0	0.0	SH 1 north – Huntly, Auckland; SH 1 south (Waikato Expressway) – Hamilton	SH 1B begins
Waikato District	Newstead	27	17	SH 26 west – Hamilton	SH 1B/SH 26 concurrency begins
Waikato District	Newstead	28	17	SH 26 east – Morrinsville, Te Aroha	SH 1B/SH 26 concurrency ends
Waipa District	Cambridge	42	26	SH 1 south (Waikato Expressway) – Rotorua, Taupō (Victoria Road) – Cambridge; SH 1 north (Waikato Expressway) – Hamilton	SH 1B ends
Concurrency terminus

=== SH 1C ===
All exits are unnumbered.

Territorial authority	Location	km	mi	Destinations	Notes
Waikato District / Hamilton City boundary	Horotiu	538	334	Te Rehu O Waikato Bridge (Waikato River)	
Waikato District / Hamilton City boundary	Horotiu	542	337	SH 39 (Koura Drive) – Te Rapa, Raglan, Ōtorohanga	
Hamilton City	Rotokauri	546	339	(Wairere Drive) – Te Rapa, Chartwell	Northbound exit and southbound entrance only
Hamilton City	Frankton	551	342	SH 23 (Massey Street) – Dinsdale, Raglan	
Hamilton City	Melville	553	344	SH 3 (Ohaupo Road) – Waitomo Caves, New Plymouth	37°48′30″S 175°16′50″E
Hamilton City	Riverlea	555	345	Cobham Bridge (Waikato River)	
Hamilton City	Hillcrest	556	345	(Morrinsville Road) – Coromandel Peninsula	Former SH 26
Waikato District	Tamahere	559	347	(Bollard Road)	Southbound exit and northbound entrance

== See also ==
- List of New Zealand state highways
