= State Highway 24 (New Zealand) =

Road in New Zealand

State Highway 24

Route information
- Maintained by NZ Transport Agency Waka Kotahi
- Length: 13.0 km (8.1 mi)

Major junctions
- West end: SH 27 (Waharoa Road West/Firth Street) at Matamata
- East end: SH 29 near Te Poi

Location
- Country: New Zealand

Highway system
- New Zealand state highways; Motorways and expressways; List
← SH 23	→ SH 25

State Highway 24 (SH 24) is a New Zealand state highway in the Waikato region. The highway was gazetted in 1997 and forms a short cut between the Matamata-Piako District and SH 29 towards the Port of Tauranga.

== Route ==
Gazetted as a new designation in 1997, SH 24 commences at a roundabout intersection with SH 27 at Matamata and travels eastwards onto Broadway. After crossing the Kinleith Branch rail line and passing through the Matamata town centre the road changes to Mangawhero Road followed by Tauranga Road. After travelling in a south-east direction for approximately 8 km the road comes across a T-intersection. SH 24 traffic turns left while straight ahead traffic heads onto Te Poi Road, an undesignated road crossing SH 29 (further west than where SH 24 terminates) and eventually SH 28 towards Rotorua. SH 24 carries on eastwards to the intersection with SH 29 east of Te Poi. Eastbound traffic on SH 29 goes straight ahead (where SH 24 terminates), while westbound traffic makes a right turn.

== See also ==
- List of New Zealand state highways
