= Waikato Expressway =

Road in New Zealand

Waikato Expressway

Route information
- Maintained by NZ Transport Agency Waka Kotahi
- Length: 101.4 km (63.0 mi)
- Existed: 8 May 1993–present
- Component highways: State Highway 1
- Tourist routes: Thermal Explorer Highway

Major junctions
- North end: Bombay Hills; Auckland Southern Motorway
- SH 2 at Pōkeno; SH 1B at Taupiri; SH 1C at Horsham Downs; SH 26 at Ruakura; SH 1C at Tamahere; SH 21 at Tamahere; SH 1B at Cambridge
- South end: Just south of Cambridge

Location
- Country: New Zealand
- Primary destinations: Pōkeno, Mercer, Meremere, Te Kauwhata, Rangiriri

Highway system
- New Zealand state highways; Motorways and expressways; List

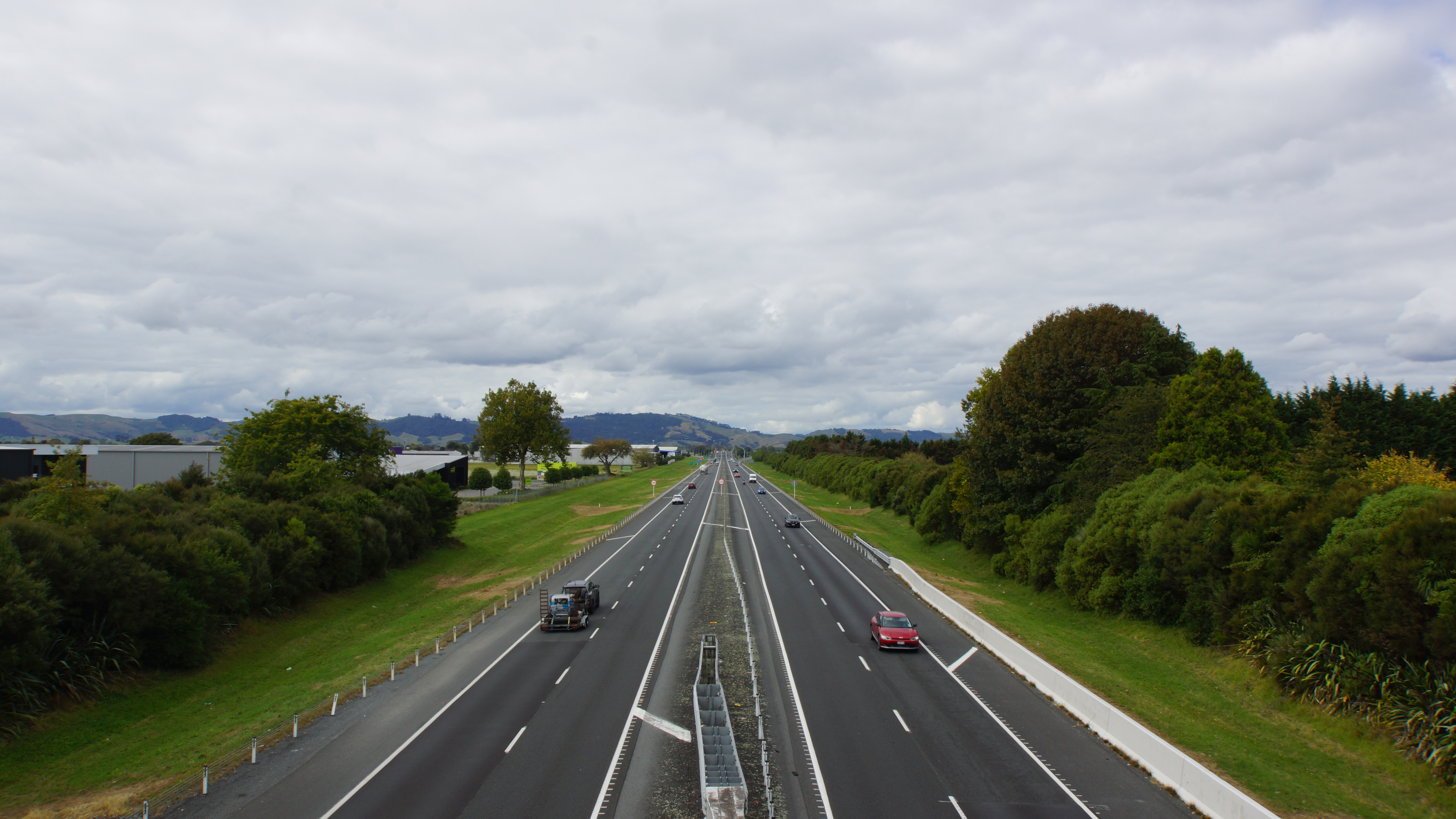
View looking southbound (east) over the Cambridge section of Waikato Expressway from Peake Road overbridge towards State Highway 1B Cambridge & Hautapu interchange

The Waikato Expressway is a dual carriageway section of State Highway 1 (SH 1) in New Zealand's Waikato region. Constructed in stages, it forms part of the link between Auckland and Hamilton. Currently stretching from Auckland to south of Cambridge, the first section of the highway was built in 1993. Throughout its lifetime, it has undergone many upgrades to optimise traffic flow throughout the Waikato region, including various bypasses of many towns in the region, culminating with Hamilton in 2022.

The final part of the Expressway was completed on 12 July 2022. The expressway forms a 101.4 km (63.0 mi)-long continuous four-lane dual carriageway from the Bombay Hills to beyond the town of Cambridge, 24 km (15 mi) south-east of Hamilton. Hamilton, Huntly, Ngāruawāhia, and Cambridge have all been bypassed by the expressway, allowing through traffic to move much more efficiently.

== History ==
While not officially designated as the Waikato Expressway until the early 2000s, the upgrading of SH 1 from the Bombay Hills to Mercer in 1992–93 can be considered the first step in construction of the expressway. In this upgrade, SH 1 from the end of the Southern Motorway to just north of Mercer was upgraded from two lanes to four, with grade-separated interchanges constructed at Bombay and the junction with SH 2 just north of the township of Pōkeno. A bypass of Pōkeno was also constructed at this time, as well as several partially separated interchanges to allow access for local property owners along the route.

The Rangiriri to Ohinewai section was completed in 2003. The northern half of this section follows the pre-existing highway while the southern half of this section deviates from the original highway in order to bypass Ohinewai and features a diamond interchange on Tahuna Rd.

The Mercer to Longswamp section from the Bombay Hills to Mercer was opened in July 2006. The former two-lane section of state highway is now the carriageway for northbound traffic, while a separate carriageway for southbound traffic was constructed in parallel. A grade-separated interchange at Mercer was also constructed, incorporating an overpass for the southbound lanes to cross over the North Island Main Trunk railway (NIMT) at this point.

As the two dual carriageway sections of the expressway (Bombay Hills to Longswamp and Rangiriri to Ohinewai) were not continuous, the section of highway between Longswamp and Rangiriri was upgraded to a 2+1 road in 2005 with the intention of upgrading it to four lanes later.

In 2009 the Waikato Expressway was announced by the Minister of Transport, Steven Joyce, as being one of seven "roads of national significance".

The $210m Mangaharakeke Drive section, originally known as the Te Rapa Bypass, was opened on 3 December 2012 between Horotiu and Rotokauri. Construction of the section of the expressway and Mangaharakeke Drive between Taupiri and Horotiu, bypassing Ngāruawāhia, began in late 2011 and was officially opened on 14 December 2013. It includes Te Rehu O Waikato Bridge over the Waikato River, and the 142 m (466 ft), 4-span, concrete-steel composite NIMTR Bridge over the NIMT and Onion Road extension, at a skew angle of 61°, which used 800 tonnes of structural steel.

Following funding approval in December 2012 construction of the Rangiriri and Cambridge sections commenced in March and August 2013 respectively. The Cambridge section was opened officially on 15 December 2015 and to traffic the next day. The Rangiriri section mainline opened as a single carriageway on 21 June 2016, and became fully operational as a dual carriageway on 13 April 2017.

Construction of the Huntly section began in late August 2015. Construction of the Hamilton section, the longest stretch, commenced in March 2016. Construction of the Longswamp section, the last section to commence, began in October 2016 and it opened in December 2019.

In May 2017, the NZTA started consulting on a 16 km (9.9 mi) extension of the expressway, from the current terminus at Cambridge south to the SH 29 intersection at Piarere.

In December 2017, the Cambridge section became one of the first two sections of highway in New Zealand to be given a speed limit of 110 km/h (68 mph).

The final section, bypassing Hamilton, was opened formally on 12 July 2022 and to traffic on 14 July 2022. As of the completion of the final section, the resulting expressway is 102 km (63 mi) in length. On the grand opening day for the final section, a celebration of the completion of the entire expressway project was held. Since 13 July 2022, the speed limit in the section between Hampton Downs and Tamahere has been 110 km/h (68 mph).

Section	Location	Length	Cost	Constructed	Note
Pōkeno	Bombay–Mercer	12 km		1993−1997	
Mercer	Mercer–Hampton Downs	11 km	$83.5m	2001−2006	Opened July 2006. New highway bypassing Mercer.
Longswamp	Hampton Downs–Te Kauwhata	6 km	$115m	2016–2019	
Rangiriri	Te Kauwhata–Ohinewai	5 km	$105m	2013–2017	
Ohinewai	Ohinewai bypass	7 km	$24m	2001−2003	Opened May 2003. New highway bypassing Ohinewai.
Huntly	Ohinewai–Taupiri	15 km	$458m	2015–2020	Opened March 2020. New highway bypassing Huntly.
Ngāruawāhia	Taupiri–Horotiu	7 km	$190m	2011–2013	Opened December 2013. New highway bypassing Ngāruawāhia.
Te Rapa	Horotiu–Rotokauri	10 km	$195m	2010–2012	Opened December 2012. New highway bypassing Te Rapa.
Hamilton	Lake Road interchange–Tamahere	22 km	$837m	2016–2022	Opened July 2022. New highway bypassing Hamilton.
Tamahere	Tamahere bypass	2 km		1995	
Cambridge	Tamahere–Cambridge south	16 km	$250m	2013–2015	Opened 16 December 2015. Upgraded highway from Tamahere to Cambridge north; new highway bypassing Cambridge.

== Safety ==
On the 16 km (9.9 mi) Cambridge section in the year following its opening, up to 50 serious crashes were avoided because of road safety barriers.

== Economic benefits ==
A 2009 report for New Zealand Transport Agency (NZTA) concluded that the benefit cost ratio of the Expressway was 0.5, i.e. for every dollar of investment the return was 50 cents.

The figures were reworked in 2010 because "Infometrics original RoNS analysis and report was concluded in December 2009. Since this time, NZTA published an updated conventional evaluation of the Waikato Expressway. The materiality of the change to the Waikato Expressway assessment warranted an update and re-run of the CGE model." The re-run model shows benefits of $186.3m pa, against annual costs of $87.3m. However, this is based on a total cost for the road of $1454.4m, which omits land costs, "as from an economy-wide perspective this is merely a transfer of ownership of an existing asset". In June 2015 the NZTA estimated the total cost of the road at between $2,200m and $2,400m. A critic has said that the calculations do not take account of the costs of owning and operating a vehicle on the roads, nor rising fuel costs. In 2016 some MPs were concerned Auckland congestion would cut travel time savings and hence the cost-benefit ratio of 1.4:1. One MP commented that the alternative commuter train, with the same CBR, didn't "get a look in".

The benefits were calculated on what was said to be a conservative estimate of 18,000 vehicles saving 15 minutes per day at a cost of $25/ hour, giving a yearly benefit of around $40 million.

== Future extension ==
In December 2020 the NZTA reported that an evaluation of extending the Waikato Expressway south of Cambridge 16 kilometres (10 mi) to the SH 1/SH 29 intersection at Piarere would be completed in 2021 but that there was as yet no funding for the project. The extension would bypass the existing highway along the eastern shore of Lake Karapiro.

== Exit list ==
=== SH 1 Waikato Expressway ===
Territorial authority	Location	km	mi	Exit	Destinations	Notes
Auckland (Franklin Local Board)	Bombay	471.5	293.0	471	Great South Road – Bombay, Pukekohe; Bombay Service Centre	Northern terminus, SH 1 continues north as Auckland Southern Motorway
Auckland (Franklin Local Board)	Bombay	473.2	294.0	473	Beaver Road East / Beaver Road West	No east/west connection, left-in, left-out only in both directions
Waikato District	Bombay	474.5	294.8	474	Nikau Road / Ridge Road	
Waikato District	Pōkeno	476.0	295.8	476	Razorback Road / Helenslee Road	Northbound entrance and southbound exit
Waikato District	Pōkeno	476.7	296.2	477	SH 2 – Coromandel Peninsula, Tauranga	
Waikato District	Pōkeno	477.9	297.0	479	Great South Road – Pōkeno	Northbound entrance and southbound exit
Waikato District	Pōkeno	478.9	297.6		Great South Road – Pōkeno	Northbound exit and southbound entrance
Waikato District	Pōkeno				Pioneer Road	Northbound left-in, left-out only
Waikato District	Pōkeno				Pioneer Road	Southbound exit only
Waikato District	Pōkeno				Pioneer Road	At-grade intersection, left and right turn in and left turn out only.
Waikato District	Mercer	483	300		Mercer	
Waikato District	Meremere				Oram Road	At-grade intersection
Waikato District	Meremere				Island Block Road – Meremere	At-grade intersection
Waikato District	Meremere				Springhill Road – Meremere	At-grade intersection
Waikato District	Meremere				Dragway Road	At-grade intersection
Waikato District	Hampton Downs	494	307		Hampton Downs Road – Hampton Downs, Spring Hill Corrections Facility	
Waikato District	Te Kauwhata	502	312		Te Kauwhata Road / Rodda Road – Te Kauwhata	
Waikato District	Rangiriri	504	313		Glen Murray Road – Rangiriri, Glen Murray	No northbound entrance
Waikato District	Rangiriri				Armitage Road	Northbound entrance and exit only
Waikato District	Ohinewai	510	320		Tahuna Road – Tahuna, Ohinewai	
Waikato District	Ohinewai	514	319		Great South Road – Huntly	Northbound entrance and southbound exit
Waikato District	Taupiri	528	328		SH 1B (Gordonton Road) – Taupiri, Huntly, Ngāruawāhia	
Waikato District	Horsham Downs	535	332		SH 1C (Mangaharakeke Drive) / Lake Road – Horotiu, Hamilton City, New Plymouth	37°40′59″S 175°12′57″E
Waikato District	Horsham Downs	539	335		Resolution Drive – Rototuna, Horsham Downs	
Waikato District / Hamilton City boundary	Chartwell	547	340		Pardoa Boulevard / Greenhill Road – Chartwell	
Waikato District / Hamilton City boundary	Ruakura	552	343		SH 26 (Ruakura Road) – Ruakura, Coromandel Peninsula	
Waikato District	Tamahere	559	347		SH 1C (Cambridge Road) – Hamilton City	
Waikato District	Tamahere	561	349		SH 21 (Airport Road) – Tamahere, Hamilton Airport	37°49′42″S 175°21′27″E
Waipa District	Cambridge	566	352		Cambridge Road – Cambridge (west)	Northbound entrance and southbound exit
Waipa District	Cambridge	571	355		SH 1B (Victoria Road) – Cambridge, Hautapu	
Waipa District	Cambridge	576	358		Tirau Road (north) – Cambridge	Northbound exit and southbound entrance Southern terminus, SH 1 continues south towards Tīrau; 37°53′48″S 175°30′29″E
Incomplete access

=== SH 1C Mangaharakeke Drive (Te Rapa spur) ===
Territorial authority	Location	km	mi	Exit	Destinations	Notes
Waikato District	Horsham Downs				SH 1 north (Waikato Expressway) – Huntly, Auckland	Mangaharakeke Drive begins No northbound exit
Waikato District	Horsham Downs				Lake Road	Northbound exit only to Waikato Expressway southbound
Waikato District–Hamilton City boundary	Horotiu				Great South Road/Te Rapa Road – Te Rapa, Ngāruawāhia	
Waikato District–Hamilton City boundary	Burbush				SH 39 (Koura Drive) – Raglan, Ōtorohanga	
Hamilton City	Avalon				Wairere Drive/Te Wetini Drive	Southbound exit and northbound entrance
Hamilton City	Avalon				Avalon Drive	Mangaharakeke Drive ends
Incomplete access

== See also ==
- List of motorways and expressways in New Zealand
