= State Highway 25 (New Zealand) =

Road in New Zealand

State Highway 25

Route information
- Maintained by NZ Transport Agency Waka Kotahi
- Length: 231 km (144 mi)

Major junctions
- West end: SH 2 near Mangatarata
- SH 26 (Paeroa Kopu Road) at Kopu
- East end: SH 2 (Rosemont Road) at Waihi

Location
- Country: New Zealand
- Primary destinations: Thames, Coromandel, Whitianga, Tairua, Whangamatā

Highway system
- New Zealand state highways; Motorways and expressways; List
← SH 24	→ SH 26

State Highway 25 (SH 25) is a New Zealand state highway that runs eastwards across the Hauraki Plains then northwards up the western side of Coromandel Peninsula and down the eastern side to Waihi. The route is very scenic and provides access to idyllic beach holiday locations. It is a major road for holidaymakers and tourists, with the summer period around Christmas and New Year's Eve a particularly busy time. It is single carriageway for the entire route. The road is windy in many parts and prone to accidents. It is New Zealand's third longest two-digit state highway, after SH 35 and SH 94. It is part of the Pacific Coast Highway. There is one spur road, SH 25A, which cuts across the peninsula west to east, almost intersecting SH 25 at both ends.

== Route ==
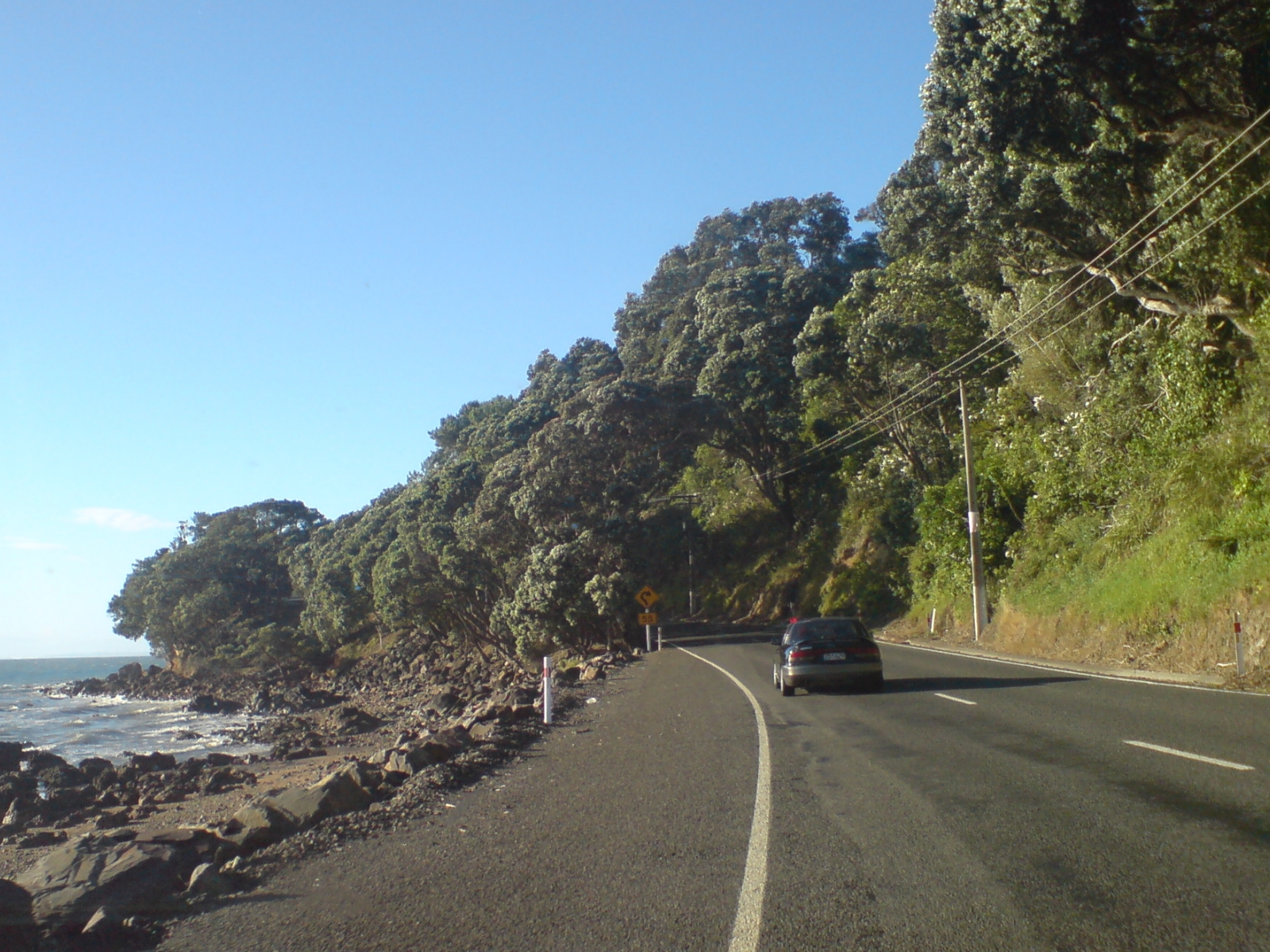
On the west coast of Coromandel Peninsula

SH 25 diverges from SH 2 at a roundabout 3 km north of Mangatarata and 11 km south-east of Maramarua, and runs eastwards across the northern end of the Hauraki Plains. It crosses the Waihou River on the new Kopu Bridge to the junction with SH 26 and turns northwards through the township of Thames. The road continues north on the western side of Coromandel Peninsula, skirting the Firth of Thames, into the small township of Coromandel before travelling eastwards across the peninsula to Kūaotunu on the Bay of Plenty side. There it turns south to Whitianga, running through the outskirts of the town on the Whitianga Bypass, and on through Coroglen and Whenuakite, then over windy hill roads into Tairua, where Pauanui is accessible on a side road. SH 25 continues southwards through the intersection with the spur highway SH 25A just south of Hikuai and on towards Whangamatā. The road bypasses Whangamatā on the west side and continues southbound until it terminates in Waihi at the intersection of Kenny Street and Rosemont Road.

== Spurs ==
State Highway 25A
- Location: Kopu–Hikuai
- Length: 28.2 km (17.5 mi)

State Highway 25A (SH 25A) traverses Coromandel Peninsula west to east directly from Kopu to Hikuai. This 28.2 km road, opened on 23 March 1967 and sealed in 1973, begins at an intersection with SH26 just 400m away from the SH 25/SH 26 intersection. It terminates at SH 25 just south of Hikuai. In January 2023 a large landslide destroyed a section of the highway, effectively closing the highway. A bridge had to be built across the landslide, and the highway reopened in December 2023.

== Route changes ==
SH 25 once went through the town centres of Whitianga and Whangamatā. In Whitianga, a bypass was constructed in 2003 carrying traffic away from the original route via Buffalo Beach Road, Albert Street, and South Highway. In Whangamatā, SH 25 bypasses the town via Tairua Road instead of using Harry Watt Drive, Hetherington Road and Port Road.

In the early 2000s the last sections of the highway were sealed, mainly on the northern part between Coromandel township and Whitianga. In 2011 NZTA completed the new Kopu Bridge, a two-lane structure, across the Waihou River. It replaced the previous one-lane bridge, where at times holidaymakers had to queue for hours to cross. The old bridge, which was built in 1928, is scheduled to be deconstructed although a key part of its history will be preserved.

== Major junctions ==
Territorial authority	Location	km	mi	Destinations	Notes
Hauraki District	Mangatarata	0	0.0	SH 2 south – Paeroa, Tauranga; SH 2 north – Auckland	SH 25 begins
Thames-Coromandel District	Kopu	23	14	New Kopu Bridge (Waihou River)	
Thames-Coromandel District	Kopu	24	15	SH 26 – Paeroa, Hamilton	SH 25A begins just south of this junction
Thames-Coromandel District	Hikuai	180	110	SH 25A – Thames	
Hauraki District	Waihi	231	144	SH 2 south (Rosemont Road) – Katikati, Tauranga; SH 2 north (Rosemont Road) – Paeroa, Auckland	SH 25 ends

== See also ==
- List of New Zealand state highways
