= State Highway 62 (New Zealand) =

Road in New Zealand

State Highway 62

Route information
- Maintained by NZ Transport Agency Waka Kotahi
- Length: 12.7 km (7.9 mi)

Major junctions
- East end: SH 1/Ferry Road at Spring Creek
- West end: SH 6 near Renwick

Location
- Country: New Zealand
- Primary destinations: Rapaura

Highway system
- New Zealand state highways; Motorways and expressways; List
← SH 61	→ SH 63

State Highway 62 (SH 62) is a state highway servicing the northeastern parts of the South Island of New Zealand. Located entirely within the Marlborough wine region of New Zealand, SH 62 provides a northern bypass of Blenheim, connecting the towns of Spring Creek (on SH 1) with Renwick (on SH 6) via the locality of Rapaura.

Despite being gazetted in 2004, is only 13 kilometres long, and is very flat, in 2008 it was assessed to be the most dangerous state highway in the country, ahead of SH 37 and SH 94. The eastern terminus with SH 1 also holds some notoriety, being listed in the top twenty intersections in New Zealand for accidents. This is attributed to the fact it shares a cross road with Ferry Road in Spring Creek and crosses the Main North Line only a few metres east of SH 1. NZTA have announced final plans to replace the intersection with a roundabout.

== See also ==
- List of New Zealand state highways
