= State Highway 36 (New Zealand) =

Road in New Zealand

State Highway 36

Route information
- Maintained by NZ Transport Agency Waka Kotahi
- Length: 48.0 km (29.8 mi)

Major junctions
- North end: SH 29 (Takitimu Drive) in Tauranga
- South end: SH 5 (Ngongotahā Road) at Ngongotahā

Location
- Country: New Zealand
- Primary destinations: Pyes Pa

Highway system
- New Zealand state highways; Motorways and expressways; List
← SH 35	→ SH 37

State Highway 36 (SH 36) is a New Zealand state highway in the Bay of Plenty region in the North Island. It is one of two state highways (along with SH 33) that form a north–south connection between the cities of Tauranga and Rotorua, SH 36 being the most westerly of the two. It was identified as a quicker route to access the two cities and extensive work was done to upgrade the rural route to state highway quality.

SH 36 is one of two state highways (the other being SH 15) to be gazetted initially in one location, revoked, then gazetted again in another location. SH 36 used to be located in the Gisborne/Hawkes Bay district, some 200 km south east of where it is now, before being revoked in 1991. SH 36 at its current location became a state highway in 2005.

== Route description ==
SH 36 begins at SH 29 in Tauranga at a roundabout junction with the toll road Takitimu Drive (Route K). SH 36 travels south-east initially before merging with Pyes Pa Road at another roundabout intersection. SH 36 then turns south through Pyes Pa and passes mostly through hillside before terminating with SH 5 at Ngongotahā, about 5 kilometres (3.1 mi) north of Rotorua.

== Route changes ==
Since being gazetted in 2005, SH 36 has had only one route change. This being at its northern terminus where SH 36 originally travelled up Pyes Pa Road and terminated at the roundabout with Cameron Road in the suburb of Greerton. It recently was shifted west to its current terminus, with the deviation along a newly constructed section of highway.

== Former route ==
Former Provincial State Highway 36 used to run between SH 2 at Patutahi west of Gisborne and SH 38 at Frasertown just north of Wairoa, a distance of 83.4 km. It was revoked in 1991.

== Major intersections ==
Territorial authority	Location	km	mi	Exit	Name	Destinations	Notes
Tauranga City	Tauriko					SH 29 west – Hamilton, Auckland; SH 29 north – City Centre, Port; SH 29A – Greerton, Mount Maunganui	SH 1 begins
Tauranga City	Tauriko					Lakes Boulevard; Taurikura Drive	
Tauranga City	Pyes Pa					Kennedy Road; Paraone Koikoi Drive	
Tauranga City	Pyes Pa					Pyes Pa Road – Greerton	
Western Bay of Plenty	No major junctions						
Rotorua Lakes	Hamurana					Hamurana Road – Hamurana	
Rotorua Lakes	Ngongotahā					SH 5 south – Rotorua; SH 5 west – Tīrau, Hamilton	SH 36 ends

== See also ==
- List of New Zealand state highways
