= State Highway 21 (New Zealand) =

Road in New Zealand

State Highway 21

Route information
- Maintained by NZ Transport Agency Waka Kotahi
- Length: 6.7 km (4.2 mi)

Major junctions
- Northeast end: SH 1 (Waikato Expressway) at Tamahere
- Hamilton Airport
- Southwest end: SH 3 (Ohaupo Road) at Ōhaupō

Location
- Country: New Zealand

Highway system
- New Zealand state highways; Motorways and expressways; List
← SH 20	→ SH 22

State Highway 21 (SH 21) is a short 6.7-kilometre (4.2 mi) stretch of highway in the North Island of New Zealand. It links State Highway 1, Waikato Expressway at Tamahere and State Highway 3 at Ōhaupō. Its main destination is Hamilton Airport and Mystery Creek, where the National Agricultural Fieldays are held.

SH 21 was gazetted as a brand new state highway designation in 1997.

== Oddities ==
SH 21 is actually 120 km (75 mi) south of where the number is supposed to be when considering the general pattern of assigning increasing state highway numbers in a north–south direction; in reality, it should lie somewhere in South Auckland. This southern placement makes SH 21 the second-most southern SH 2x highway, after SH 28.

At the exit to Hamilton Airport, SH 21 used to show Hamilton to be in both directions (i.e. left to Hamilton and Rotorua, right to Hamilton and Waitomo Caves), and was possibly the only place in the State Highway network in which this happened (the actual difference between turning left and turning right is only 800 metres or 2,600 feet). In 2015 the signs were updated to show Hamilton to the left, and the route to the right is now on a separate sign reading "Hamilton via State Highway 3".

== Major intersections ==
Territorial authority	Location	km	mi	Exit	Name	Destinations	Notes
Waikato	Tamahere	0	0.0			SH 1 south (Waikato Expressway)/Thermal Explorer Highway – Rotorua; SH 1 north (Waikato Expressway)/Thermal Explorer Highway – Hamilton	SH 21 begins
Waikato River		2	1.2	Narrows Bridge			
Waipa	Mystery Creek	5	3.1			Ossie James Drive – Hamilton Airport	
Waipa	Mystery Creek	5	3.1			Mystery Creek Road – Mystery Creek Events Centre	
Waipa	Rukuhia	7	4.3			SH 3 south – Waitomo Caves, New Plymouth; SH 3 north – Hamilton	SH 21 ends

== Narrows Bridge ==
The first bridge opened on 12 February 1879, costing £999 17s 4d, with a £300 government subsidy, £90 each from Waipa and Waikato County Councils and the rest paid by donations, paid by a long list of subscribers from 1878. It lasted until blown up in 1940.

Its 49.5 m (162 ft) reinforced concrete replacement, supported by a 31 m (102 ft) steel arch, opened in December 1939. It is 1.78 km (1.11 mi) from the Tamahere end of SH21 with a road width of 20 ft (6.1 m) wide, plus a 5 ft (1.5 m) footpath, which cost £5,660 (£3,000 from government and the rest shared by the counties) and was designed by Jones and Adams (see also Tuakau Bridge). It was given a NZHPT Category 2 historic listing in 1985. The river banks were soil nailed in 2010 to protect the foundations. The effect of the works can be seen in the AADT figures – 2008 (5087), 2009 (5288), 2010 (4972), 2011 (4921), 2012 (4910), 2013 (4892), 2014 (5391), 2015 (5551).
