= State Highway 37 (New Zealand) =

Road in New Zealand

State Highway 37

Route information
- Maintained by NZ Transport Agency Waka Kotahi
- Length: 7.3 km (4.5 mi)

Major junctions
- East end: SH 3 at Hangatiki
- West end: Waitomo Caves

Location
- Country: New Zealand

Highway system
- New Zealand state highways; Motorways and expressways; List
← SH 36	→ SH 38

State Highway 37 (SH 37) is a New Zealand state highway in the Waikato/Waitomo region of the North Island. It exists as a small spur from SH 3 to the Waitomo Caves, one of New Zealand's best-known tourist attractions. It was gazetted as a new state highway designation in 1997.

For many years the old T-intersection with SH 3 was a high crash area with many fatalities including foreign tourists. In 2015 NZTA completed a new roundabout to improve safety on the route.

== See also ==
- List of New Zealand state highways
