= James Cotter (politician) =

New Zealand politician

The Honourable James Cotter MLC
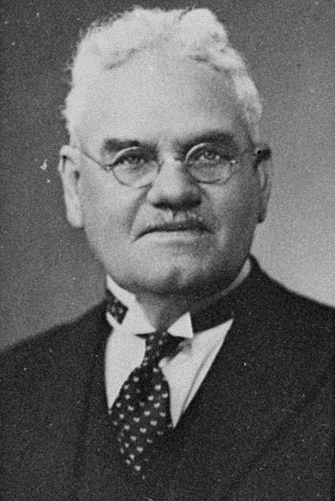

Member of the Legislative Council
- In office 9 March 1936 – 30 April 1947

Personal details
- Born: 1869 Hinuera, New Zealand
- Died: 1948 (aged 78–79) New Zealand
- Party: Labour Party

James Cotter (1869–1948) was a member of the New Zealand Legislative Council from 9 March 1936 to 8 March 1943; and 9 March 1943 to 30 April 1947, when he resigned. He was appointed by the First Labour Government.

He was from Hinuera in the Waikato.
