= Kaimai Range =

Mountain range in North Island of New Zealand

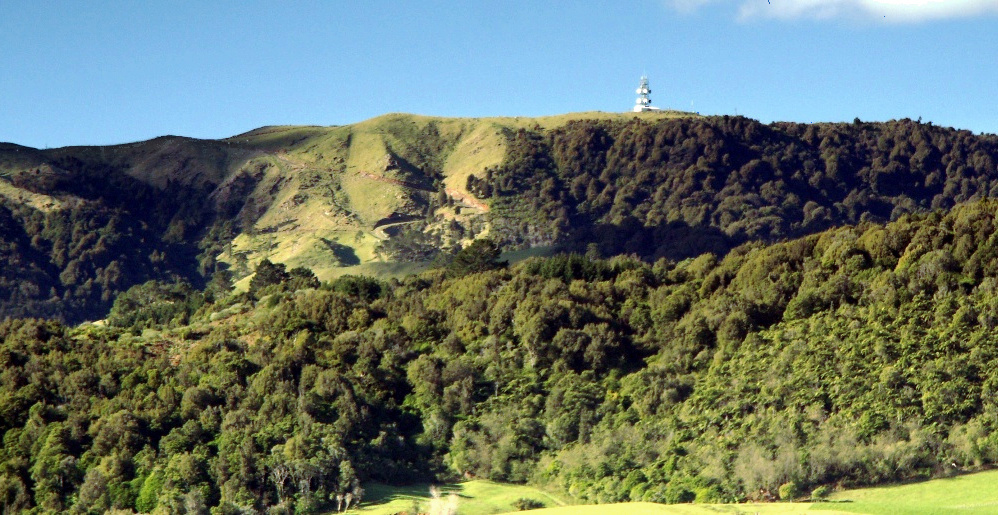
- Kaimai Range with communications towers

Highest point
- Elevation: 953 m (3,127 ft)
- Coordinates: 37.533654°S 175.742412°E

Geography
- Approximate extent of Kaimai Range

Geology
- Rock age(s): Between 5.5 million (some volcanic features) with major uplift between 1 million and 150 thousand years ago5.5–0.15 Ma
- Mountain type(s): Mostly andestic and some rhyolitic formations
- Rock type(s): Predominantly andesite and rhyolite volcanics
- Volcanic arc: Coromandel Volcanic Zone
- Last eruption: 1.53 million years ago

Climbing
- Easiest route: State Highway 29 (New Zealand) (North-South track, Hendersons Tramline, Ngamuwahine track)
- Normal route: State Highway 2 (New Zealand) (Mount Karangahake Walk, Waitawheta Pipeline Walk and most eastern tracks)
- Access: As well as above State Highway 26 (New Zealand) (Te Arohoa track), Te Arohoa Gordon Road, Old Te Arohoa Road (Te Tuhi track) and State Highway 24 (New Zealand)

The Kaimai Range (sometimes referred to as the Kaimai Ranges) is a mountain range in the North Island of New Zealand. It is part of a series of ranges, with the Coromandel Range to the north and the Mamaku Ranges to the south. The Kaimai Range separates the Waikato in the west from the Bay of Plenty in the east.

The highest point of the range is Mount Te Aroha (953 m), at the foot of which is the town of Te Aroha. The range's terrain is rough, and only two roads pass over it: State Highway 2, across the northern end of the range through Karangahake Gorge, and State Highway 29 from Tauranga to Hamilton. Mt Te Aroha can be described as the northern head peak of the Kaimai Range.

The New Zealand Ministry for Culture and Heritage gives a translation of "eat fermented food" for Kaimāī.

The Kaimai Ranges feature in local Māori folklore. The name Te Aroha translates from Māori as Te - The & Aroha - Love. Literally "the love". The name comes from a Māori legend that the sun god - male - loved the moon goddess - female. They never could see each another due to the planets' positions. One day, the moon goddess came to earth to see the sun god, despite knowing the risks, and was turned to stone as the daylight came. Hers was the ultimate expression of love: Te Aroha in Māori. This is why, on the Kaimai Range to the right of Mt Te Aroha, a high rock silhouetted against the skyline that looks shaped like a woman from afar, is known locally as the Rock of Hinemoa.

Within the Kaimai Ranges the Hendersons Tramline loop track follows the route of bush tramlines and haul lines once used to extract logs from the bush. The walk includes forest and clearings near the fringe of the park. A side track off the main walk leads down to the base of a waterfall and a large swimming hole. Also some 10–16 km, on the Gordon backroad from te Aroha is a four-wheel drive track named Thomsons track, that takes adventurers from the foothills around manawaru to the ranges top, where a large swimming hole is present.

== Geology and history ==
The Kaimai Range is the result of a fault that uplifted primarily andesitic rocks from long-extinct volcanoes. This fault has not been active for about 140,000 years and started more than a million years ago. In pre-European times, the area was densely forested by trees such as kauri, mataī and tawa, and was a home for birds such as kererū, tūī, kākā and kiwi.

== Demographics ==
Kaimai statistical area, which does not include the entire range, covers 327.89 km^{2} (126.60 sq mi) and had an estimated population of 2,280 as of June 2025, with a population density of 7.0 people per km^{2}.

Historical population
Year	Pop.	±% p.a.
2006	1,701	—
2013	1,752	+0.42%
2018	2,028	+2.97%
2023	2,148	+1.16%

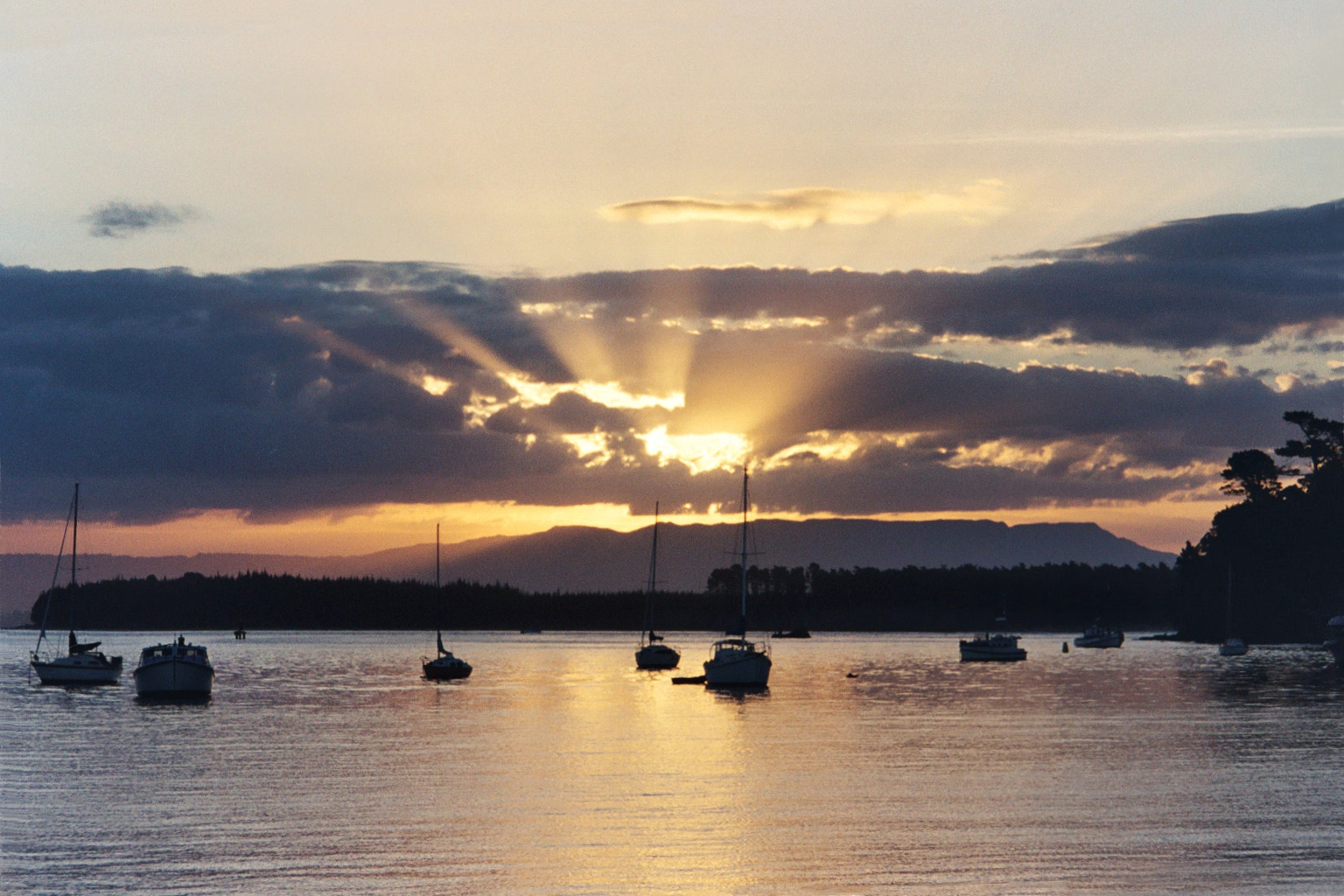
Kaimai Range forms a backdrop to Tauranga Harbour

Kaimai had a population of 2,148 in the 2023 New Zealand census, an increase of 120 people (5.9%) since the 2018 census, and an increase of 396 people (22.6%) since the 2013 census. There were 1,101 males, 1,038 females, and 6 people of other genders in 705 dwellings. 1.7% of people identified as LGBTIQ+. The median age was 41.8 years (compared with 38.1 years nationally). There were 414 people (19.3%) aged under 15 years, 351 (16.3%) aged 15 to 29, 1,077 (50.1%) aged 30 to 64, and 306 (14.2%) aged 65 or older.

People could identify as more than one ethnicity. The results were 92.3% European (Pākehā); 15.1% Māori; 2.2% Pasifika; 2.7% Asian; 0.7% Middle Eastern, Latin American and African New Zealanders (MELAA); and 3.1% other, which includes people giving their ethnicity as "New Zealander". English was spoken by 97.8%, Māori by 3.2%, and other languages by 5.3%. No language could be spoken by 1.8% (e.g. too young to talk). New Zealand Sign Language was known by 0.3%. The percentage of people born overseas was 15.5, compared with 28.8% nationally.

Religious affiliations were 24.7% Christian, 0.3% Hindu, 0.3% Islam, 0.8% Māori religious beliefs, 0.3% Buddhist, 0.8% New Age, 0.3% Jewish, and 1.4% other religions. People who answered that they had no religion were 63.4%, and 8.5% of people did not answer the census question.

Of those at least 15 years old, 303 (17.5%) people had a bachelor's or higher degree, 1,062 (61.2%) had a post-high school certificate or diploma, and 360 (20.8%) people exclusively held high school qualifications. The median income was $45,600, compared with $41,500 nationally. 222 people (12.8%) earned over $100,000 compared to 12.1% nationally. The employment status of those at least 15 was 981 (56.6%) full-time, 276 (15.9%) part-time, and 36 (2.1%) unemployed.

== Kaimai Tunnel ==
The Kaimai Railway Tunnel runs for nearly nine kilometres under the range, making it the longest tunnel in New Zealand. Construction of the tunnel started from both sides of the range in 1969: the headings met in 1976 and the tunnel opened on 12 September 1978. The Kaimai Range and this tunnel led to a Silver Fern railcar service between Auckland and Tauranga being named the Kaimai Express. This service operated from 1991 until 2001. The tunnel is still used by about 20 freight trains a day.

A peak of the Kaimai directly above the tunnel, previously unnamed, was named Stokes Peak in 2010 in honour of geographer Evelyn Stokes.

== Flight 441 disaster ==
At approximately 9:09 am on 3 July 1963 the DC-3 Skyliner ZK-AYZ Hastings operating New Zealand National Airways Corporation Flight 441 from Whenuapai Airport, Auckland to Tauranga crashed into the range. All 23 aboard died, making it the worst air disaster in mainland New Zealand.

== Communications ==
The New Zealand Post Office engineering division (radio) built and maintained a microwave communications facility near the top of Kaimai range, close to the Hamilton–Tauranga highway saddle. In the 1960s it was a Lenkurt relay as part of the national network, linking Sanitorium Hill near Cambridge to Rotorua, with a spur to Tauranga. It now has cell phone and various other radio communications facilities, and is owned and operated by Telecom New Zealand. Land Parcel: Part Section 126 Block II Tapapa SD

The New Zealand Broadcasting Corporation (NZBC) commissioned a television broadcast relay station atop Mount Te Aroha in 1963, relaying Auckland's AKTV2 channel (now part of TVNZ 1) to Hamilton and Tauranga. Today, Mount Te Aroha is the main television transmitter and one of two main FM radio transmitters (along with Ruru) serving the Waikato.

Airways New Zealand maintains a secondary surveillance radar and ADS-B installation on Te Weraiti, a peak on the Kaimai range, 5 kilometres (3.1 mi) north of State Highway 29 saddle. This is used to facilitate air traffic control.

== See also ==
- Tunnels in New Zealand
- Matamata-Piako District
- Western Bay of Plenty District
- Ohinemuri River
