= State Highway 29 (New Zealand) =

Road in New Zealand

State Highway 29

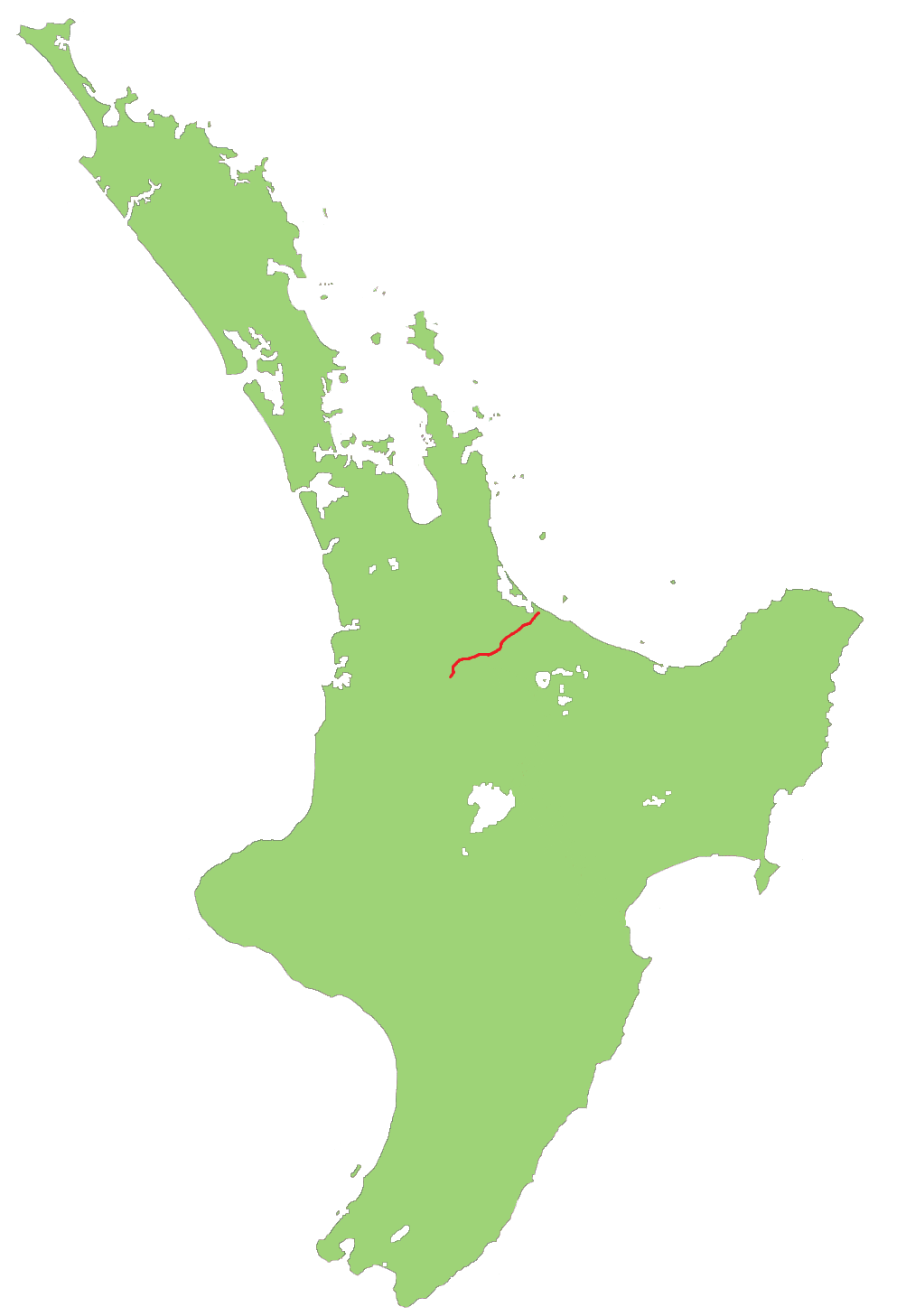

Route information
- Maintained by NZ Transport Agency Waka Kotahi
- Length: 53.7 km (33.4 mi)

Major junctions
- Northeast end: SH 2 north (Tamateu Arikinui Drive) in Tauranga
- SH 36 (Takitimu Drive) in Tauranga; SH 28 (Rapurapu Road) near Te Poi; SH 24 (Tauranga Road) near Te Poi; SH 27 near Hinuera
- Southwest end: SH 1 at Piarere

Location
- Country: New Zealand
- Primary destinations: Tauranga, Te Poi, Hinuera

Highway system
- New Zealand state highways; Motorways and expressways; List
← SH 28	→ SH 30

State Highway 29 (SH 29) is a New Zealand state highway that travels over the Kaimai Ranges linking the Bay of Plenty and Waikato regions. For most of its length, SH 29 is a two-lane single carriageway with occasional passing lanes and slow vehicle bays. 5 km of it near its eastern terminus is part of the Takitimu Drive Toll Road.

== Route ==
SH 29 begins at SH 2 at a grade separated intersection at which only westbound SH 2 traffic can enter and eastbound traffic can exit. Immediately after it commences, SH 29 becomes the Takitimu Drive (Pyes Pa – Mount Maunganui Expressway) Toll Road. Before the eastern terminus was shifted to this route it was better known as 'Route K'. At the end of this tolled section, SH 29 reaches a roundabout intersecting the former eastern section (now SH 29A) and SH 36. SH 29 turns west through the village of Tauriko. From here SH 29 roughly follows the Wairoa River as it climbs the Kaimai Ranges.

About a quarter of the way up the Kaimai's, SH 29 passes the Ruahihi Power Station and crosses the Wairoa River. About halfway up the Kaimais, the highway travels through the small village of Lower Kaimai. Once at the Kaimai Summit, SH 29 descends steeply to the Waikato region. After passing a junction with SH 28, SH 29 reaches a T-Junction with SH 24. Due to the layout of the junction, traffic wishing to stay on SH 29 must turn at this junction. 4 km after the junction, SH 29 reaches the village of Te Poi. SH 29 crosses SH 27 at a staggered T-Junction before entering the village of Hinuera. SH 29 then runs through the Hinuera Gap, which the Waikato River used to flow through until volcanic debris altered its course 20,000 years ago. SH 29 terminates at a Roundabout with SH 1 near Piarere.

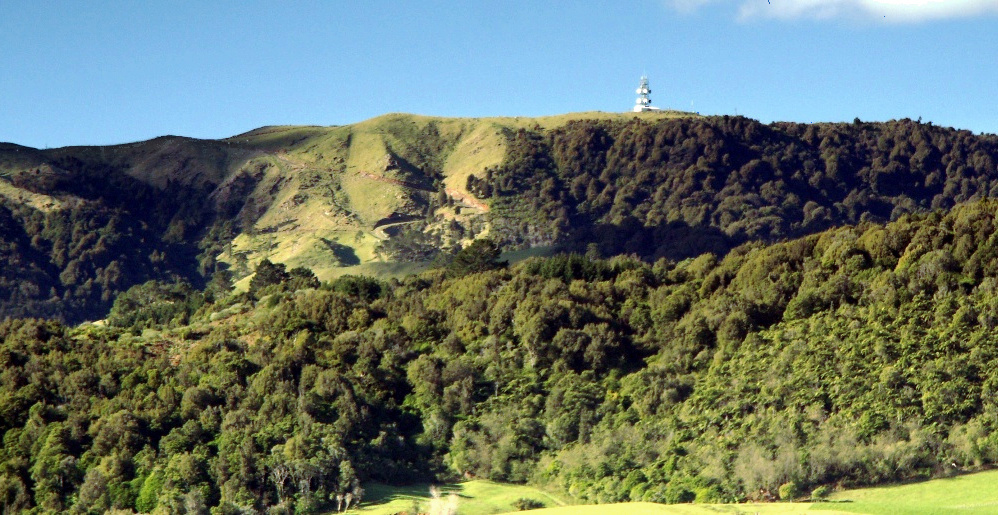
The Kaimai Range, which State Highway 29 traverses.

== History ==
During the 1890s it was decided that a formed road was needed to link Tauranga with the Waikato region. Two potential routes were suggested, both following the course of unformed tracks; these being the Kaimai Track and the Thompson's Track. At the time, there was much debate about which route should be chosen, but ultimately the Kaimai Route was selected.

The first journey in a car over the Kaimai Road was made on 6 December 1912; the journey from Tauranga to Cambridge took 3 and a half hours. Throughout the 1920s, the road was metaled, with work starting at each end of the road, and working towards the summit.

During 1939, a 3 miles (4.8 km) deviation was constructed on the eastern side of the summit. It replaced a narrow section of road with dozens of corners. The old alignment is now called Old Kaimai Road.

Originally, the Kaimai Road (then called Cambridge Road) connected with Waihi Road in the suburb of Brookfield. Traffic would then travel down Waihi Road to the town centre. Around the 1950s, the existing road from Tauriko to Greerton was upgraded, and a new stretch of road was built from Barkes Corner to Maungatapu. SH 29 now follows this route through Tauranga's southern suburbs. When this road opened, there was only one roundabout on it; at Barkes Corner. Since then, 5 more roundabouts have been added, bringing the total number to 6.

From the time the Maungatapu Bridge opened, until the 1980s, SH 29 (running concurrently with SH 2) ran through the suburb of Maungatapu on Maungatapu Road. Since the 1980s, SH 29 has run through Maungatapu as a limited access road, with a grade separated junction. As part of this work, a roundabout was constructed at Maungatapu, replacing a T-Junction. Around the same time the T-Junction at Te Maunga was replaced with a roundabout.

In December 2008, the Maungatapu and Welcome Bay roundabouts were signalised in response to rising levels of congestion. The roundabouts became the first in New Zealand to be permanently signalised, and have been widely considered to be successful at easing congestion.

Prior to 2009, when SH 2 ran via the Maungatapu Bridge instead of the Tauranga Harbour Bridge; SH 29 ran concurrently with SH 2 to Te Maunga, then ran along Maunganui Road and Hewletts Road, before terminating just before the Harbour Bridge. SH 2 now travels via the Harbour Bridge, Hewletts Road, and Maunganui Road to Te Maunga, and SH 29 was truncated to Te Maunga.

In August 2015, Route K became part of the New Zealand State Highway Network. Formerly administered by the Tauranga City Council, NZTA took over administration in conjunction with the newly commissioned electronic toll gantry, replacing the existing toll booths. SH 29 now follows this route forming a new link from the south-west to the city and port of Tauranga. The existing route east of the SH 36/Route K roundabout to Te Maunga became a new designation of SH 29A.

== Spurs ==
State Highway 29A
- Location: SH 2 at Te Maunga – SH 29/SH 36 at The Lakes
- Length: 13.5 km (8.4 mi)

SH 29A was gazetted in 2015 and covers the former section of SH 29 east of the roundabout with SH 36/Route K. SH 29A starts at a roundabout interchange with SH 2. The highway crosses the East Coast Main Trunk Railway and passes Baypark Stadium. From here, SH 29A becomes a four lane dual carriageway until just before it crosses the Maungatapu Bridge, past Rangataua Bay. The highway travels in a wide cutting through Maungatapu, and Taipari Street crosses it on a bridge. Then SH 29A arrive at the signalised roundabout at Hairini, so traffic wishing to stay on the highway must turn either left or right depending on their direction of travel. It then travels straight across another signalised roundabout at Welcome Bay, before travelling through four roundabouts within 5 km, eventually terminating with SH 29.

== Future ==
Between 2010 and 2011, the New Zealand Transport Agency (NZTA) investigated a proposed realignment of State Highway 29 between Soldiers Road and Ngamuwahine Road to improve safety. The project was estimated to cost approximately NZ$6 million if constructed.

Between 2010 and 2012, NZTA investigated the possibility of improving SH 29 between Omanawa Road and the SH 36/Route K roundabout. Three options were investigated. All of them involve turning that section of road into a limited access highway with grade separated junctions. A number of reasons were given by the NZTA for why improvements were needed. These included the high crash rate, high traffic volumes, and concerns over ground stability.

== Major junctions ==
Territorial authority	Location	km	mi	Exit	Name	Destinations	Notes
Tauranga City	Tauranga South	0	0.0			SH 2 north (Takitimu Drive) – City Centre, Mount Maunganui, Whakatāne	SH 29 (Takitimu Drive Toll Road) begins
Tauranga City	The Lakes	14	8.7			SH 29A – Greerton, Mount Maunganui; SH 36 – Rotorua	Toll entry/exit
Tauranga City	The Lakes	15	9.3			Cambridge Road - Katikati, Te Puna, Bethlehem	
Western Bay of Plenty	Lower Kaimai	24	15			McLaren Falls Road - Omanawa, McLaren Falls	
Matamata-Piako	Te Poi	42	26			SH 28 – Rotorua, Putāruru	
Matamata-Piako	Te Poi	43	27			SH 24 – Matamata	
Matamata-Piako	Hinuera	54	34			SH 27 south – Tīrau, Rotorua	Staggered intersection
Matamata-Piako	Hinuera	54	34			SH 27 north – Matamata, Coromandel Peninsula	Staggered intersection
Matamata-Piako	Piarere	67	42			SH 1 south – Rotorua, Taupō; SH 1 north – Cambridge, Hamilton	SH 29 ends
Concurrency terminus; Electronic toll collection

=== SH 29A ===
The entire route is within Tauranga City.

Location	km	mi	Exit	Name	Destinations	Notes
Te Maunga	0	0.0			SH 2 east (Tauranga Eastern Link) – Rotorua, Whakatāne; SH 2 west (Maunganui Road) – Mount Maunganui, Tauranga	SH 29A begins
Te Maunga	0.2	0.12			Truman Lane – Baypark Stadium	
Maungatapu	5	3.1			Maungatapu Road – Maungatapu	Eastbound entrance only
Maungatapu	6	3.7			Taipari Street – Maungatapu	Westbound exit only
Maungatapu	7	4.3			Turret Road – City Centre; Maungatapu Road – Maungatapu	Formerly SH 2A
Hairini	8	5.0			Hairini Street – City Centre, Hairini; Welcome Bay Road – Welcome Bay, Ohauiti	
Ohauiti	10	6.2			Poike Road (east) – Ohauiti; Poike Road (west) – Polytech, Windermere	
Greerton	11	6.8			Oropi Road (north) – Greerton, City Centre; Oropi Road (south) – Oropi	
Barkes Corner	12	7.5			Cameron Road – Greerton, Racecourse, City Centre; Pyes Pa Road – Pyes Pa; Marshall Avenue	
The Lakes	14	8.7			SH 29 north (Takitimu Drive Toll Road) – City Centre, Port; SH 29 west – Hamilton, Auckland; SH 36 – Rotorua	SH 29A ends
Incomplete access
