= State Highway 27 (New Zealand) =

Road in New Zealand

State Highway 27

Route information
- Maintained by NZ Transport Agency Waka Kotahi
- Length: 92.4 km (57.4 mi)

Major junctions
- North end: SH 2 at Mangatarata
- SH 26 at Tatuanui; SH 24 (Broadway) at Matamata; SH 29 near Hinuera
- South end: SH 1 (Main Road) at Tīrau

Location
- Country: New Zealand
- Towns: Waharoa, Matamata

Highway system
- New Zealand state highways; Motorways and expressways; List
← SH 26	→ SH 28

State Highway 27 (SH 27) is a state highway in the Waikato region of the North Island of New Zealand. It is an important north–south link along the Waihou/Piako valley and forms an important transport route across the mostly dairy farming Matamata-Piako District. SH 27, in conjunction with SH 2, is often used as an alternative route to SH 1 between Auckland and Tauranga, Rotorua and Taupō.

For its entire length, SH 27 is a single carriageway road with one lane in each direction and at-grade intersections and property access. The New Zealand Transport Agency classifies the highway as an arterial route.

Traffic at Kaihere increased by 31%, from an average of 3,965 vehicles a day in 2008, to 5,182 in 2017 and 5,467 in 2019. In 2017 982 (19%) of those were heavy vehicles, mainly trucks.

== History ==
The land the road cuts through was once mostly swampland. Originally tracks ran through this swampland but the paths were small and cattle often drowned. As the swamp was drained the roading gradually improved.

== Major junctions ==
Territorial authority	Location	km	mi	Destinations	Notes
Hauraki District	Mangatarata	0	0.0	SH 2 north – Pōkeno, Auckland; SH 2 south – Paeroa, Tauranga	SH 27 begins
Matamata-Piako District	Tatuanui	45	28	SH 26 west – Morrinsville, Hamilton; SH 26 east – Te Aroha, Coromandel Peninsula	
Matamata-Piako District	Matamata	73	45	SH 24 (Broadway) – Te Poi, Tauranga	
Matamata-Piako District	Hinuera	82	51	SH 29 west – Cambridge, Hamilton	Staggered intersection
Matamata-Piako District	Hinuera	82	51	SH 29 east – Te Poi, Tauranga	Staggered intersection
South Waikato District	Tīrau	92	57	SH 1 south (Main Road) – Rotorua, Taupō; SH 1 north – Cambridge, Hamilton	SH 27 ends
1.000 mi = 1.609 km; 1.000 km = 0.621 mi: Concurrency terminus
