= State Highway 28 (New Zealand) =

Road in New Zealand

State Highway 28

Route information
- Maintained by NZ Transport Agency Waka Kotahi
- Length: 20.9 km (13.0 mi)

Major junctions
- South end: SH 1 at Putāruru
- SH 5 north near Tīrau; SH 5 south near Tapapa
- North end: SH 29 near Te Poi

Location
- Country: New Zealand

Highway system
- New Zealand state highways; Motorways and expressways; List
| ← SH 27 | → SH 29 |

State Highway 28 (SH 28) is a New Zealand state highway in the Waikato region. The highway was gazetted in 1997 as a faster route for traffic travelling between SH 1 and SH 29 towards the Port of Tauranga. Prior to the formation of SH 28 the quickest route, only if using state highways, was via Tīrau and SH 27. There are no towns on this route and due to the highway being mapped to existing rural roads there are several places where motorists need to give way to traffic from other roads.

== Route ==
SH 28 leaves SH 1 at Putāruru on Whites Road and after travelling north-east for 5.8 km the highway meets SH 5 and shares a concurrency eastbound for 2.5 km. SH 28 then leaves SH 5 and travels northbound on Harwoods Road /Te Poi Road (South) for the next 10.7 km where it turns east at a T-junction onto Rapurapu Road. The last 5 km leads to its terminus at SH 29 just at the foot of the Kaimai Ranges.

== See also ==
- List of New Zealand state highways
