= Iwitahi =

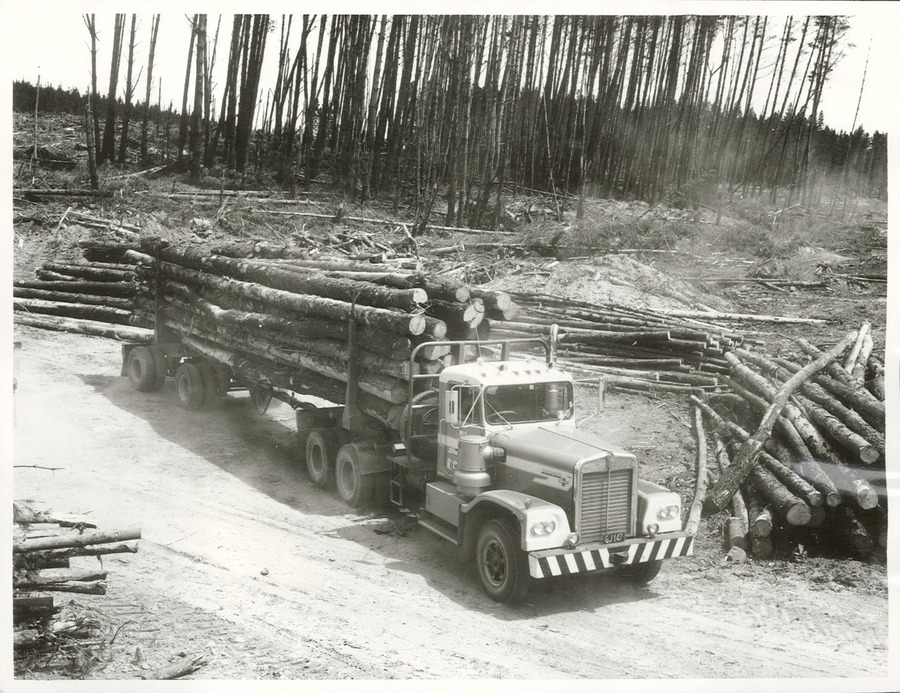

- Location within North Island
- Coordinates: 38°49′45″S 176°16′15″E
- Country: New Zealand
- Region: Bay of Plenty Region
- Territorial authority: Taupō District

Iwitahi is a rural locality in the Taupō District and Bay of Plenty Region of New Zealand's North Island. It is situated on State Highway 5 between Taupō and Napier, about 20 km southeast of Taupō. It is a farming area, largely surrounded by forest, close to the plains of the upper Rangitaiki River. The locality was formerly known as Iwatahi.

== Climate ==
Climate data for Waimihia Forest, elevation 743 m (2,438 ft), (1981–2010)
Month	Jan	Feb	Mar	Apr	May	Jun	Jul	Aug	Sep	Oct	Nov	Dec	Year
Mean daily maximum °C (°F)	19.5 (67.1)	19.6 (67.3)	17.3 (63.1)	13.9 (57.0)	11.1 (52.0)	8.8 (47.8)	8.2 (46.8)	9.0 (48.2)	11.3 (52.3)	13.1 (55.6)	15.8 (60.4)	17.8 (64.0)	13.8 (56.8)
Daily mean °C (°F)	14.5 (58.1)	14.6 (58.3)	12.6 (54.7)	9.7 (49.5)	7.4 (45.3)	5.2 (41.4)	4.5 (40.1)	5.0 (41.0)	7.0 (44.6)	8.7 (47.7)	10.8 (51.4)	13.1 (55.6)	9.4 (49.0)
Mean daily minimum °C (°F)	9.6 (49.3)	9.6 (49.3)	7.8 (46.0)	5.4 (41.7)	3.8 (38.8)	1.7 (35.1)	0.8 (33.4)	1.1 (34.0)	2.7 (36.9)	4.2 (39.6)	5.8 (42.4)	8.4 (47.1)	5.1 (41.1)
Average rainfall mm (inches)	117.1 (4.61)	103.6 (4.08)	128.2 (5.05)	110.2 (4.34)	142.1 (5.59)	158.5 (6.24)	148.3 (5.84)	140.2 (5.52)	147.6 (5.81)	158.4 (6.24)	112.0 (4.41)	164.6 (6.48)	1,630.8 (64.21)
Source: NIWA (rain 1971–2000)
