= Maungatapu Bridge =

- Coordinates: 37°42′29″S 176°11′20″E
- Carries: Motor vehicles
- Crosses: Tauranga Harbour
- Locale: Tauranga City, New Zealand

Location
- Interactive map of Maungatapu Bridge

The Maungatapu Bridge is a beam bridge which crosses the Tauranga Harbour and connects the Matapihi and Maungatapu peninsulas in New Zealand. The bridge opened in 1959 and is 316 metres long and 10 metres wide. The bridge carries two lanes of traffic and a footpath. Prior to 2009 State Highway 2 and State Highway 29 ran concurrently over the bridge. Following the completion of the Harbour Link project, State Highway 2 was diverted over the Tauranga Harbour Bridge, so at the present time only State Highway 29A runs over the bridge.

== History ==
Since the bridge has been built in 1959, there have been changes to its design. For example, in 2014, there was a project that implemented a new barrier between the bridge and the already existing one. That project took about two months and is now being redeveloped in the more recent project. The current redevelopment process has been separated into four stages. It has completed three out of the four thus far.

== Present ==
Before the Maungatapu Bridge was undergoing construction there were many accidents happening across it. In turn, there were many complaints and worries from the citizens who drove through the bridge daily. According to citizens who have driven across it for a long period of time, the danger of the bridge had increased along with the dramatic increase of traffic. In June 2016, there was car crash involving multiple cars that injured five people in total, two of them considered to be seriously injured. The crash was so serious that the road had to be blocked off which caused a serious backup in terms of traffic flow. Just last November 2018, there was another multiple vehicle car crash that once again blocked off the roads. There were no serious injuries, but it did result in another round of complaints and worries from the citizens of there needing to be a change. These are just a few accounts of the many accidents that have happened throughout the years of the bridge's existence.

As of now, the Maungatapu Bridge is under the process of construction. The Maungatapu underpass was opened on June 22, 2018. In July 2018, the New Zealand Transport Agency set up a trial run that lasted for ten days. This trial closed off the straight through option of the bridge and allowed for people to only use the roundabout. In doing this, the hopes of those in charge of the project and the trial was to see if the new design was efficient and safe. It gave the planner a chance to gather information regarding the traffic flow and travel times of the new design. The construction consists of four stages, three of them already completed, while the remaining is still in works. The first stage dealt with the addition of street lights, the second stage was improvements to the intersections, and the third had to do with gathering data that would best help those in charge of the project in coming up with the best new design.

== Future ==
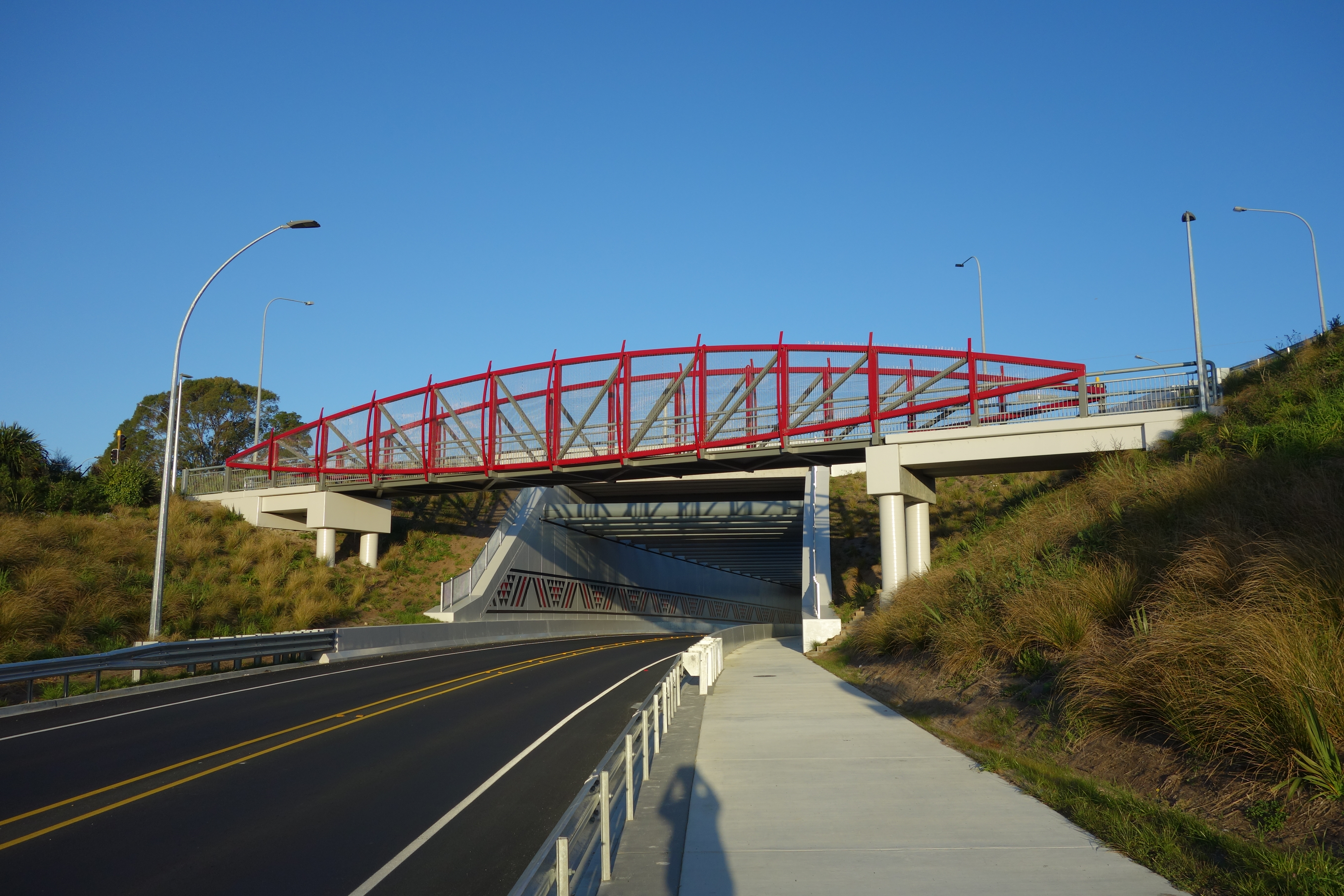
Welcome Bay Bridge

The Maungatapu Bridge is currently under construction and has been since 2008 when they had street lights added to the roundabouts as the first stage of the redevelopment design. The second stage dealt with improvements of the intersection, and the third stage dealt with finding the best solution for improvements in traffic flow and safety. That was all stated before, and now, the project is currently on its fourth stage which calls for the Maungatapu underpass to become two lanes instead of one, as well as the construction of a new bridge over the Kaitemako Stream. Part of the new design will link the Welcome Bay Road to the Hairini highway. In going through this redevelopment process, the hopes of the New Zealand Transport Agency are to ensure better traffic flow and the safety of its citizens in terms of the movement of the road and even the pedestrians. There is no information regarding the completion date for the new project.
