= State Highway 5 (New Zealand) =

Road in New Zealand

State Highway 5

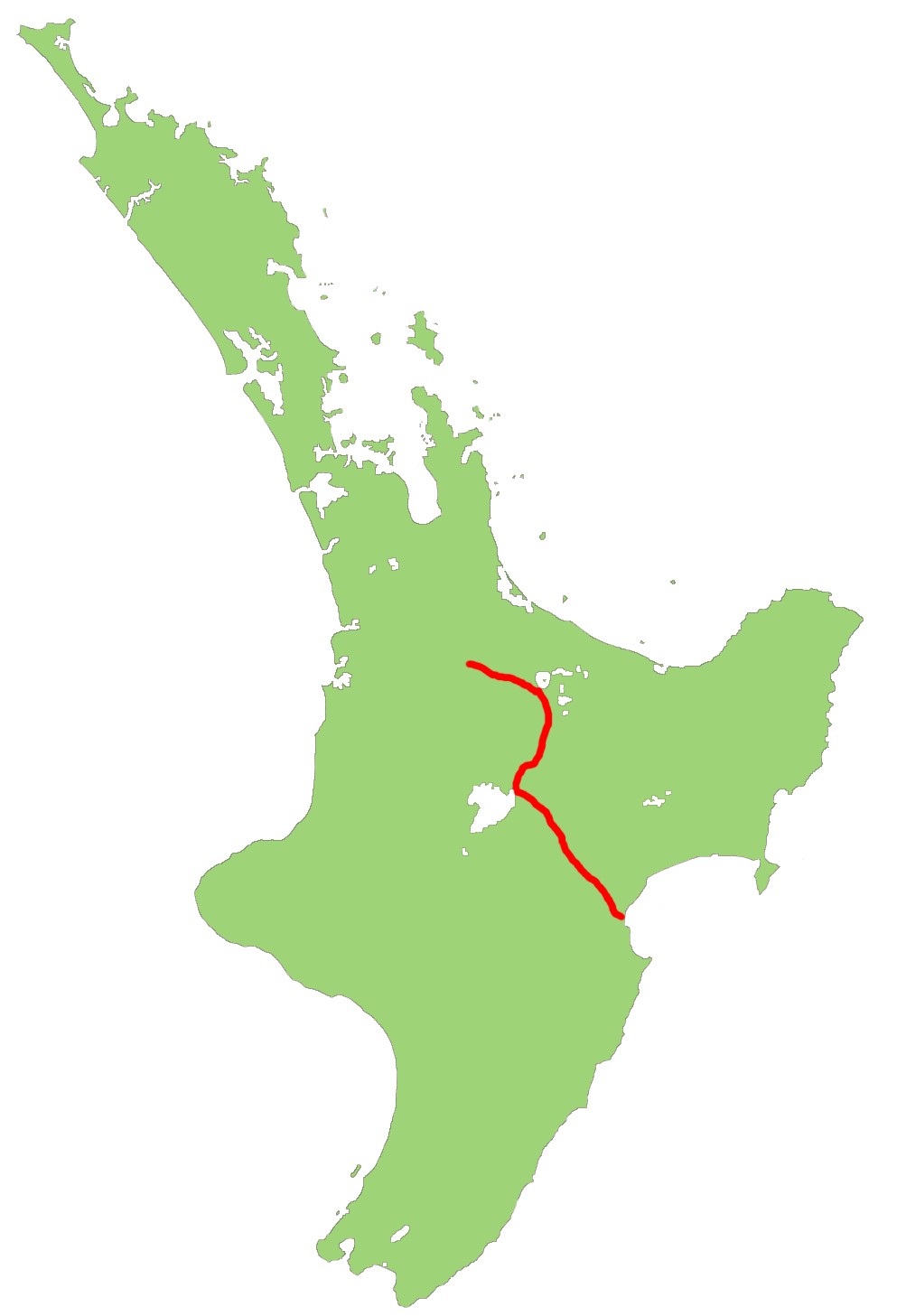

Route information
- Maintained by NZ Transport Agency Waka Kotahi
- Length: 262 km (163 mi)
- Tourist routes: Thermal Explorer Highway

Major junctions
- Northwest end: SH 1 at Tīrau
- SH 1 north at Wairakei; SH 1 south (East Taupō Arterial) at Taupō
- Southeast end: SH 2 (Main North Road) near Bay View

Location
- Country: New Zealand
- Primary destinations: Rotorua, Wairakei, Taupō

Highway system
- New Zealand state highways; Motorways and expressways; List
← SH 4	→ SH 6

State Highway 5 (SH 5), one of New Zealand's eight national highways, runs from State Highway 1 at Tīrau, in the south Waikato, to State Highway 2, close to the Hawke's Bay coast at Bay View, 10 km north of Napier. It is the second shortest of the national highways.

SH 5 is a two-lane single carriageway, except for a two-kilometre section of dual carriageway in Rotorua, and has at-grade intersections and property accesses in both rural and urban areas. The NZ Transport Agency classifies SH 5 as a regional strategic highway, except for the section concurrent with SH 1 around Taupō, where it is classified as a national strategic road.

== Route ==
SH 5 leaves SH 1 at a roundabout just south-east of the town of Tīrau in the south Waikato and heads east, crossing over the Mamaku Ranges to Lake Rotorua. The highway skirts the southwestern edge of the lake, entering the city of Rotorua and continuing south through the Rotorua-Taupō thermal area to the upper reaches of the Waikato River. SH 5 joins SH 1 at Wairakei, a few kilometres north of the town of Taupō, and runs concurrently with it on the East Taupo Arterial road, bypassing the town to the east.

SH 5 diverges from SH1 at a roundabout just east of Taupō and heads southeast on the Napier-Taupō road. It runs just south of the prominent Mount Tauhara then passes through the small settlement of Opepe, which is at the intersection of two major pre-European walking tracks (Taupō-Napier and Urewera-Tokaanu). It then runs through the pine plantations of the Kaingaroa Forest, on the broad Kaingaroa plains that were formed from the ash from the Taupō eruption of ~230 CE, passing Iwitahi and the site of Te Rāhui Solar Farm. Exiting the forest it crosses the headwaters of the Rangitaiki River.

Leaving the Volcanic Plateau, it follows the Waipunga River, the first section being the Runanga Deviation, which opened in 1972, replacing the last long stretch of narrow unsealed road. The highway then crosses the Mohaka River.

The highway next ascends to cross the 708-metre Titiokura Saddle, the site of Harapaki Wind Farm, before passing through Te Pohue. From here, the road descends into the Esk River valley. SH 5 ends at the Napier–Wairoa section of SH 2, close to the Hawke's Bay coast and the mouth of the Esk River, at the northern end of the Bay View district, 10 km north of Napier.

== Route changes ==
Prior to the 1931 Hawke's Bay earthquake the final part of the route was over Hill Road between Eskdale and Bay View, with the road from Taupō meeting the Wairoa road at Bay View, three kilometres south of the present junction. The earthquake raised the land and altered the course of the Esk River; the course of the highway was changed to follow suit.

SH 5 once ran through central Rotorua. The old route left the current route at the Lake Road traffic lights, and followed the route of Lake Road, Ranolf Street, Amohau Street, Fenton Street, and Hemo Road, where it re-merges with the current section. Today, it follows Old Taupo Road, which bypasses the central city to the west.

The Taupo Bypass (East Taupo Arterial) opened in 2010, shifting the concurrent SH 1 and SH 5 from the township and lakeside to the eastern outskirts of Taupō.

In February 2023, State Highway 5 was hit by Cyclone Gabrielle and this natural disaster resulted in over 32 damage points, mainly concentrated between Te Haroto and Eskdale. The route underwent complete shutdown due to flooding from Esk River and landslides. Bridges between Bay View and Glengarry also sustained structural damage. State Highway 5 reopened between 7am and 7pm starting from March 20, 2023 and allowed full travel after March 27.

== Major junctions ==
Distances are measured from north to south.

Territorial authority	Location	km	mi	Destinations	Notes
South Waikato District	Tīrau	0	0.0	SH 1 south – Taupō; SH 1 north – Hamilton	SH 5 begins 37°59′06″S 175°46′04″E
South Waikato District	Tapapa	5	3.1	SH 28 south – Putāruru	SH 5/SH 28 concurrency begins
South Waikato District	Tapapa	7	4.3	SH 28 north – Matamata, Tauranga	SH 5/SH 28 concurrency ends
Rotorua Lakes	Ngongotahā	43	27	SH 36 – Ngongotahā, Tauranga	
Rotorua Lakes	Rotorua	50	31	SH 30A (Pukuatua Street) – City Centre, Whakatāne	
Rotorua Lakes	Whakarewarewa	55	34	SH 30 east (Hemo Road) – City Centre, Whakatāne	SH 5/SH 30 concurrency begins
Rotorua Lakes	Waipa Village	56	35	SH 30 west – Tokoroa, Te Kūiti	SH 5/SH 30 concurrency ends
Rotorua Lakes	Waiotapu	77	48	SH 38 – Murupara, Waikaremoana	
Taupō District	Wairakei	124	77	(Wairakei Drive) – Taupō; SH 1 north – Hamilton	SH 5/SH 1 concurrency begins 38°37′24″S 176°06′00″E
Taupō District	Taupō	135	84	SH 1 south (Taupo Bypass) – Tūrangi, Palmerston North (Napier Road) – Taupō	SH 5/SH 1 concurrency ends 38°42′18″S 176°05′16″E
Hastings District	No major junctions				
Napier City	Bay View	262	163	SH 2 north – Wairoa, Gisborne; SH 2 south – Napier, Hastings	SH 5 ends
Concurrency terminus
