= State Highway 26 (New Zealand) =

Road in New Zealand

State Highway 26

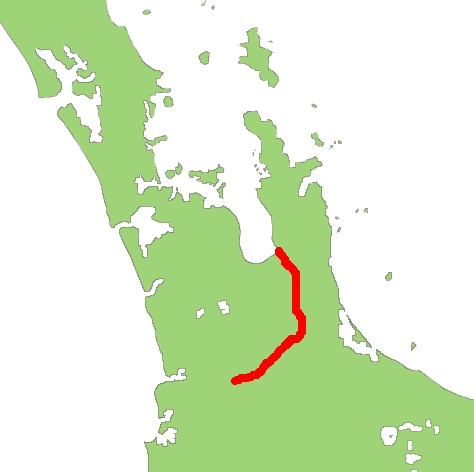

Route information
- Maintained by NZ Transport Agency Waka Kotahi
- Length: 96 km (60 mi)

Major junctions
- Southwest end: SH 1 (Waikato Expressway) near Hamilton
- SH 27 at Tatuanui; SH 2 (Normanby Road) at Paeroa
- Northeast end: SH 25 (Ngati Maru Highway) at Kopu

Location
- Country: New Zealand
- Major cities: Morrinsville, Te Aroha, Paeroa

Highway system
- New Zealand state highways; Motorways and expressways; List
← SH 25	→ SH 27

State Highway 26 (SH 26) is a state highway in the North Island of New Zealand, linking Hamilton with the Coromandel Peninsula. It starts from the Waikato Expressway at Ruakura on the eastern outskirts of Hamilton and travels 96 kilometres to Kopu, 6 kilometres south of Thames. It passes through Morrinsville, Te Aroha and Paeroa.

== Major intersections ==
Territorial authority	Location	km	mi	Destinations	Notes
Waikato District / Hamilton City boundary	Ruakura			SH 1 north (Waikato Expressway) – Auckland; SH 1 south (Waikato Expressway) – Rotorua, Taupō	SH 26 begins
Waikato District	Newstead	6	3.7	SH 1B north (Marshmeadow Road) – Taupiri	SH 26/SH 1B concurrency begins
Waikato District	Newstead	7	4.3	SH 1B south (Hoeka Road) – Cambridge	SH 26/SH 1B concurrency ends
Matamata-Piako District	Tatuanui	35	22	SH 27 north – Auckland; SH 27 south – Matamata, Tīrau	
Hauraki District	Paeroa	69	43	SH 2 south (Normanby Road) – Tauranga	SH 26/SH 2 concurrency begins
Hauraki District	Paeroa	69	43	SH 2 north (Normanby Road) – Auckland	SH 26/SH 2 concurrency ends
Thames-Coromandel District	Kopu	95	59	SH 25A (Kopu-Hikuai Road) – Tairua, Whitianga, Whangamatā	
Thames-Coromandel District	Kopu	96	60	SH 25 west/Pacific Coast Highway – Auckland; SH 25 north/Pacific Coast Highway – Thames, Coromandel Township	SH 26 ends
Concurrency terminus

== Route changes ==
When the Hamilton section of the Waikato Expressway opened in July 2022, the western terminus of SH 26 was rerouted from its old terminus on Cambridge Road in Hillcrest to Ruakura Road to connect to the new location of SH 1 in a full diamond interchange.

== Spurs ==
- State Highway 26A is a short spur, running along Morrinsville Road from State Highway 26 at Newstead to State Highway 1C at Hillcrest.

== See also ==
- List of New Zealand state highways
