= Tauranga Harbour Bridge =

- Coordinates: 37°40′30″S 176°10′27″E
- Carries: Motor vehicles
- Crosses: Tauranga Harbour
- Locale: Tauranga City, New Zealand

The Tauranga Harbour Bridge refers to two bridges (the original two lanes wide, and the new three lanes wide) that carry Te Awanui Drive over the Tauranga Harbour. Te Awanui Drive is part of an expressway that connects Tauranga CBD to Mount Maunganui. On the Tauranga CBD side, Te Awanui Drive connects to Takitimu Drive, which crosses the Chapel Street Viaduct before running along the edge of the Waikareao Estuary. On the Mount Maunganui side, Te Awanui Drive connects to Hewletts Road, which runs through an industrial area towards Maunganui Road.

== History ==
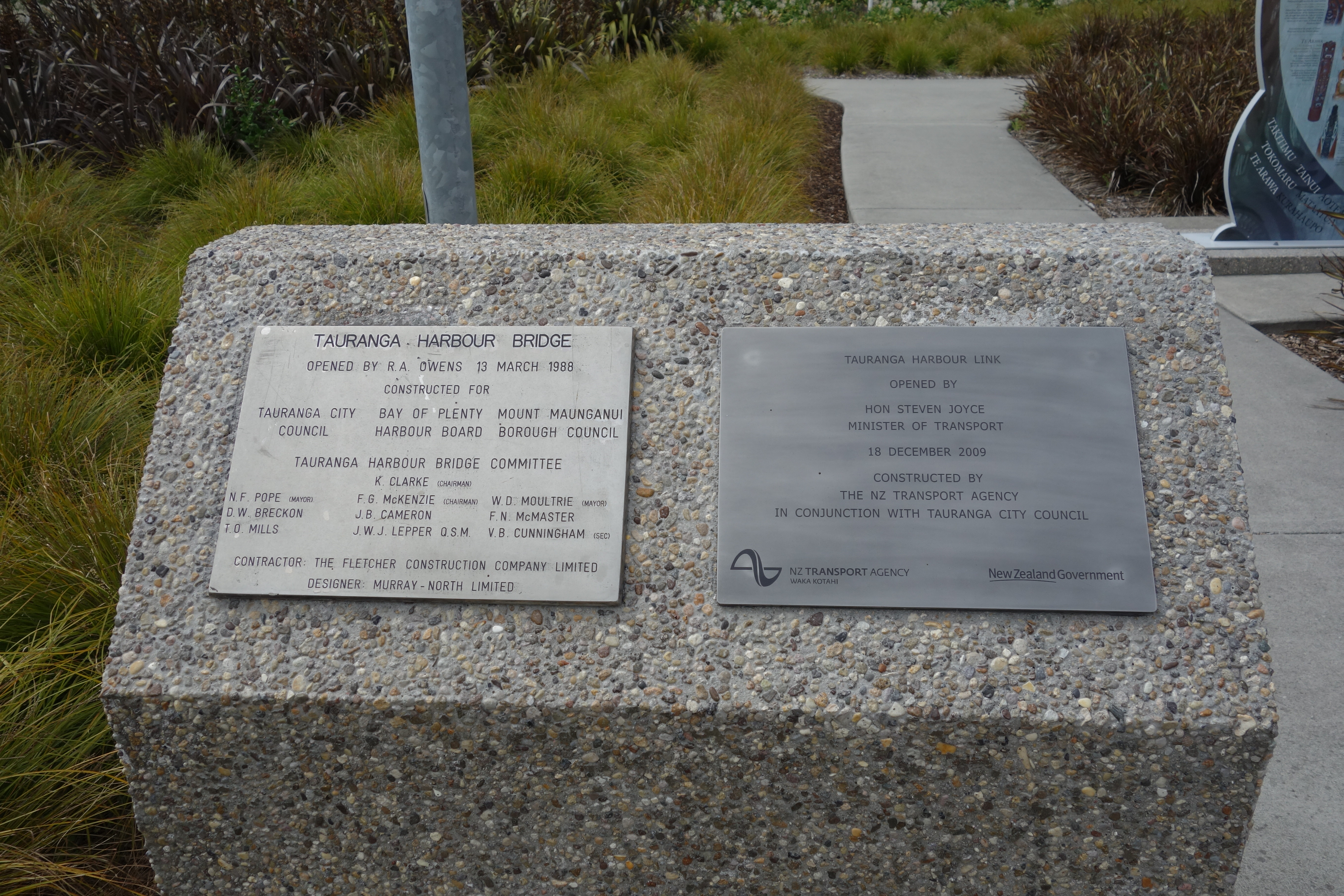
Plaques at the Tauranga Harbour Bridge

The original bridge was opened on 13 March 1988 by former Mayor of Tauranga, Robert Arthur Owens. Prior to the opening of the bridge, traffic wishing to travel between Tauranga CBD and Mount Maunganui had to use the Hairini and Maungatapu bridges. The Tauranga Harbour Bridge was tolled from opening until 22 July 2001. The tollbooths were on the Mount Maunganui side of the bridge. As the population of Tauranga grew, the bridge began to get very congested during the peak hours.

As part of the Harbour Link project (which also included the construction of the Chapel Street Viaduct, the widening of Hewletts Road, and the construction of the Hewletts Road Flyover), a new bridge was constructed next to the original. On 7 September 2009, the new bridge opened. The original bridge now carries traffic towards Tauranga CBD; the new bridge carries traffic towards Mount Maunganui.

== Causeway ==
On the Mount Maunganui side of the bridge is a causeway which carries Te Awanui Drive and houses the Tauranga Bridge Marina. At the other end of the causeway, two parallel bridges, collectively known as Aerodrome Bridge, cross a small channel of water, and connect the causeway to Mount Maunganui. Until 2009, there was only one Aerodrome Bridge, and the road that ran along the causeway was only one lane each way. The road was widened and a second Aerodrome Bridge was built as part of the Harbour Link project.
