= Hinuera =

Settlement in Waikato, New Zealand

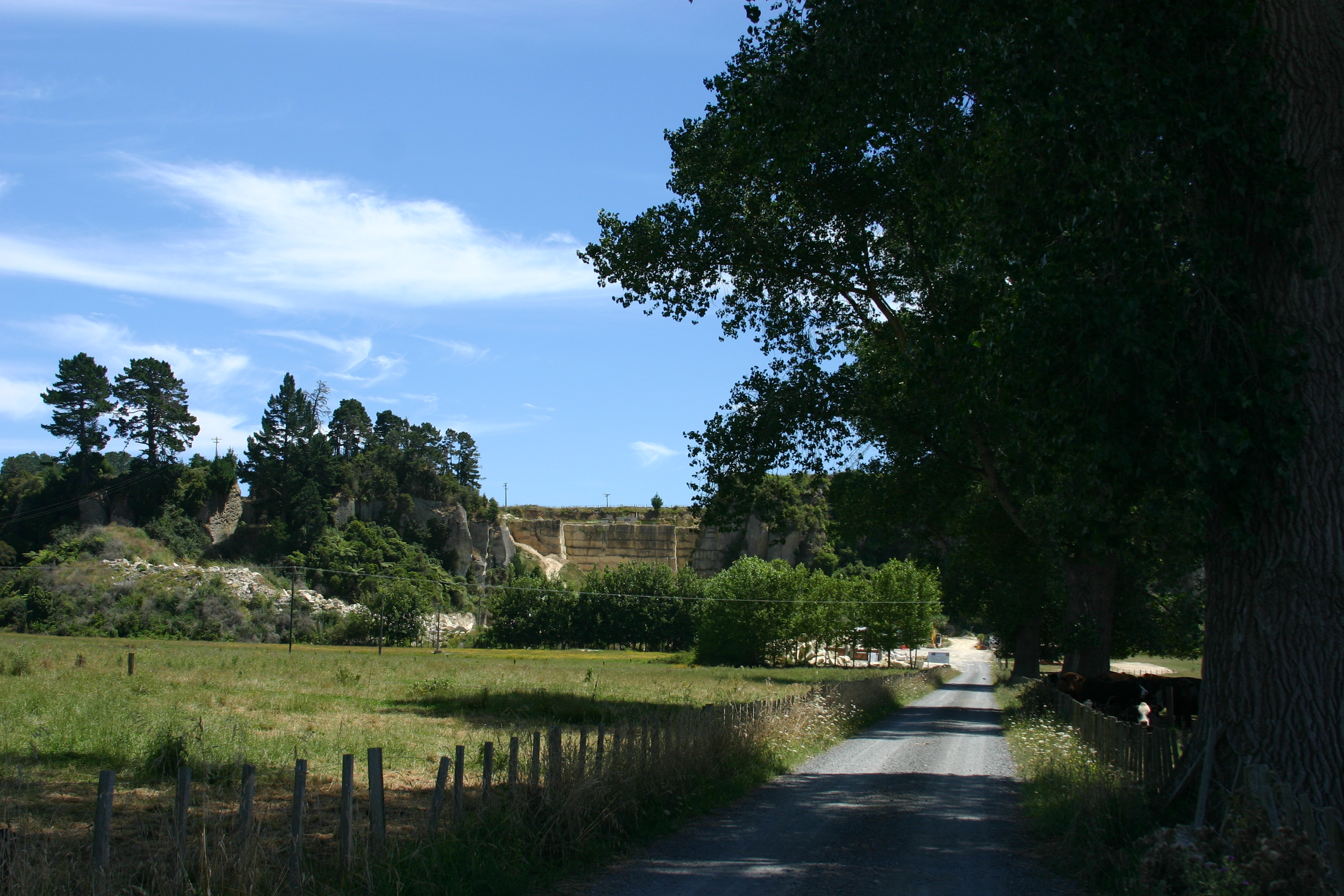
- Hinuera Stone Quarry
- Interactive map of Hinuera
- Coordinates: 37.880°S 175.761°E
- Country: New Zealand
- Region: Waikato
- Territorial authority: Matamata-Piako District
- Ward: Matamata General Ward
- Electorates: Waikato; Hauraki-Waikato (Māori)

Government
  - Territorial Authority: Matamata-Piako District Council
  - Regional council: Waikato Regional Council
  - Waikato MP: Tim van de Molen
  - Hauraki-Waikato MP: Hana-Rawhiti Maipi-Clarke

Area
  - Total: 10.61 km^{2} (4.10 sq mi)

Population (2023 Census)
  - Total: 162
  - Density: 15.3/km^{2} (39.5/sq mi)
- Time zone: UTC+12 (NZST)
  - Summer (DST): UTC+13 (NZDT)
- Postcode: 3472
- Area code: 07

Hinuera is a settlement in the Waikato Region of New Zealand's North Island. It is located along State Highway 29, approximately halfway between the cities of Hamilton and Tauranga. It also contains the Hinuera cliffs along State Highway 29.

Hinuera had a butter factory from 1922 to 1987. Electric street lights were introduced in 1923.

== Demographics ==
Hinuera settlement and its surrounds cover 10.61 km^{2} (4.10 sq mi). The SA1 area is part of the larger Hinuera statistical area.

Historical population for Hinuera settlement and surrounds
Year	Pop.	±% p.a.
2006	150	—
2013	153	+0.28%
2018	162	+1.15%
2023	162	+0.00%

Hinuera had a population of 162 in the 2023 New Zealand census, unchanged since the 2018 census, and an increase of 9 people (5.9%) since the 2013 census. There were 84 males and 75 females in 66 dwellings. 1.9% of people identified as LGBTIQ+. The median age was 34.8 years (compared with 38.1 years nationally). There were 36 people (22.2%) aged under 15 years, 27 (16.7%) aged 15 to 29, 69 (42.6%) aged 30 to 64, and 27 (16.7%) aged 65 or older.

People could identify as more than one ethnicity. The results were 88.9% European (Pākehā); 20.4% Māori; 3.7% Pasifika; 3.7% Asian; 1.9% Middle Eastern, Latin American and African New Zealanders (MELAA); and 3.7% other, which includes people giving their ethnicity as "New Zealander". English was spoken by 96.3%, Māori language by 1.9%, and other languages by 7.4%. The percentage of people born overseas was 11.1, compared with 28.8% nationally.

Religious affiliations were 27.8% Christian, 3.7% Māori religious beliefs, and 1.9% other religions. People who answered that they had no religion were 61.1%, and 7.4% of people did not answer the census question.

Of those at least 15 years old, 15 (11.9%) people had a bachelor's or higher degree, 84 (66.7%) had a post-high school certificate or diploma, and 27 (21.4%) people exclusively held high school qualifications. The median income was $48,300, compared with $41,500 nationally. 15 people (11.9%) earned over $100,000 compared to 12.1% nationally. The employment status of those at least 15 was that 66 (52.4%) people were employed full-time, 15 (11.9%) were part-time, and 3 (2.4%) were unemployed.

=== Hinuera statistical area ===
Hinuera statistical area covers 129.37 km^{2} (49.95 sq mi) and had an estimated population of 1,210 as of June 2025, with a population density of 9.4 people per km^{2}.

Historical population for Hinuera statistical area
Year	Pop.	±% p.a.
2006	1,110	—
2013	1,098	−0.16%
2018	1,137	+0.70%
2023	1,134	−0.05%
The 2006 population is for a larger area of 130.31 km^{2}. Source:

Hinuera had a population of 1,134 in the 2023 New Zealand census, a decrease of 3 people (−0.3%) since the 2018 census, and an increase of 36 people (3.3%) since the 2013 census. There were 582 males and 552 females in 444 dwellings. 1.9% of people identified as LGBTIQ+. The median age was 43.0 years (compared with 38.1 years nationally). There were 207 people (18.3%) aged under 15 years, 183 (16.1%) aged 15 to 29, 540 (47.6%) aged 30 to 64, and 207 (18.3%) aged 65 or older.

People could identify as more than one ethnicity. The results were 88.4% European (Pākehā); 10.8% Māori; 1.6% Pasifika; 6.1% Asian; 1.3% Middle Eastern, Latin American and African New Zealanders (MELAA); and 2.6% other, which includes people giving their ethnicity as "New Zealander". English was spoken by 96.3%, Māori language by 2.4%, Samoan by 0.5%, and other languages by 9.3%. No language could be spoken by 1.9% (e.g. too young to talk). The percentage of people born overseas was 18.3, compared with 28.8% nationally.

Religious affiliations were 33.9% Christian, 1.3% Hindu, 0.8% Islam, 0.5% Māori religious beliefs, 0.8% Buddhist, 0.3% New Age, and 1.1% other religions. People who answered that they had no religion were 53.7%, and 7.9% of people did not answer the census question.

Of those at least 15 years old, 162 (17.5%) people had a bachelor's or higher degree, 516 (55.7%) had a post-high school certificate or diploma, and 255 (27.5%) people exclusively held high school qualifications. The median income was $53,000, compared with $41,500 nationally. 135 people (14.6%) earned over $100,000 compared to 12.1% nationally. The employment status of those at least 15 was that 531 (57.3%) people were employed full-time, 135 (14.6%) were part-time, and 12 (1.3%) were unemployed.

== Railway station ==
Hinuera was a flag station off Hinuera Rd, on the Kinleith Branch, from 8 March 1886. It was 78 m (256 ft) above sea level. The station was renamed from Mangawhara to Hinuera on 1 April 1897, as the Post Office found that Mangawhara was confused with Mangawhare, near Dargaville. By then the station had a shelter shed, platform, cart approach, a 24 ft (7.3 m) by 20 ft (6.1 m) goods shed (increased to 40 ft (12 m) by 15 ft (4.6 m) in 1915), cattle yards and a passing loop for 29 wagons. Hinuera was used as a transfer point during construction of Horahora power station in 1911, for additional turbines in the 1920s. The station became staffed and expanded to 3 tracks in 1919, when part of the plantation was removed. Like many stations in this area, Hinuera was protected by a tree plantation, part of which remains, though more of it, on the east side, was felled between 1943 and 1966. The station closed to passengers on 12 November 1968 and to freight on 29 March 1981. Only the plantation and passing loop remain.

	Former adjoining stations	
Matamata; Line open, station closed 7.91 km (4.92 mi)	Kinleith Branch	Okoroire; Line open, station closed 7.32 km (4.55 mi)

== Education ==
Hinuera School is a co-educational state primary school for Year 1 to 6 students, with a roll of 166 as of July 2026. It was established as Hinuera Public School in 1892 and operated out of a building leased from the Railway Department. The building could fit 26 pupils, with a roll of 22 and an average attendance of 17.

== Hinuera Stone ==
Hinuera Stone, or Ongatiti Ignimbrite, is a Late Pleistocene, light-brown rock containing angular fragments of pumice in a fine-grained ash matrix. It has been quarried since at least 1893, though not on the present scale until 1954, and is sold as Hinuera Stone for cladding and other decorative uses. The stone is soft enough to be quarried by cutting with saws. One of the first houses built with Hinuera stone was the Bishop's House in Ponsonby in 1893.

== Hinuera Gap ==
The Hinuera Gap, a geological feature stretching west and southwest from the locality towards Piarere, was in prehistoric times the path of the Waikato River, which had its outlet in the Firth of Thames. The river's course was altered to its current outflow by the massive Oruanui eruption about 26,500 years ago. A remnant river, the Waitoa River, now flows through the gap, with its source lying less than one kilometre from the Waikato River, close to the junctions of SH1 and SH29. The route of the latter of these roads takes it through the Hinuera Gap.

== Notable people ==
- James Cotter, MLC was from Hinuera
