= Piarere =

Locality in Waikato, New Zealand

Coordinates: 37.95°S 175.67°E

- Interactive map of Piarere
- Country: New Zealand
- Region: Waikato
- District: South Waikato District
- Ward: Tīrau Ward
- Electorates: Waikato; Taupō; Te Tai Hauāuru (Māori)

Government
  - Territorial Authority: South Waikato District Council
  - Regional council: Waikato Regional Council
  - Mayor of South Waikato: Gary Petley
  - Waikato and Taupō MPs: Tim van de Molen and Louise Upston
  - Te Tai Hauāuru MP: Debbie Ngarewa-Packer

Area
  - Total: 71.80 km^{2} (27.72 sq mi)

Population (2023 census)
  - Total: 423
  - Density: 5.89/km^{2} (15.3/sq mi)
- Time zone: UTC+12 (NZST)
  - Summer (DST): UTC+13 (NZDT)

Piarere is a locality in the Waikato region of New Zealand's North Island. It is situated on State Highway 29 close to its junction with State Highway 1, close to the shore of Lake Karapiro. The nearest towns are Tīrau, six kilometres to the southeast, Matamata, 10 kilometres to the northeast, and Cambridge, 10 kilometres to the northwest.

The meaning of the settlement's name is uncertain, as piarere may be translated from Māori in numerous ways, but it is possibly a personal name.

The Hinuera Gap, a geological feature stretching northeast of Piarere, was in prehistoric times the path of the Waikato River, which had its outlet in the Firth of Thames. The river's course was altered to its current outflow by the massive eruption of Lake Taupo 25,000 years ago.

== Demographics ==
Piarere locality covers 71.80 km^{2} (27.72 sq mi) It is part of the larger Tīrau statistical area.

Historical population
Year	Pop.	±% p.a.
2006	342	—
2013	336	−0.25%
2018	396	+3.34%
2023	423	+1.33%

Piarere had a population of 423 in the 2023 New Zealand census, an increase of 27 people (6.8%) since the 2018 census, and an increase of 87 people (25.9%) since the 2013 census. There were 210 males and 210 females in 165 dwellings. 2.1% of people identified as LGBTIQ+. There were 105 people (24.8%) aged under 15 years, 57 (13.5%) aged 15 to 29, 189 (44.7%) aged 30 to 64, and 69 (16.3%) aged 65 or older.

People could identify as more than one ethnicity. The results were 86.5% European (Pākehā), 14.9% Māori, 2.1% Pasifika, 6.4% Asian, and 1.4% other, which includes people giving their ethnicity as "New Zealander". English was spoken by 96.5%, Māori by 2.1%, Samoan by 0.7%, and other languages by 8.5%. No language could be spoken by 2.8% (e.g. too young to talk). New Zealand Sign Language was known by 0.7%. The percentage of people born overseas was 14.9, compared with 28.8% nationally.

Religious affiliations were 31.9% Christian, 1.4% Hindu, 0.7% Buddhist, 0.7% New Age, and 2.8% other religions. People who answered that they had no religion were 53.2%, and 9.2% of people did not answer the census question.

Of those at least 15 years old, 69 (21.7%) people had a bachelor's or higher degree, 177 (55.7%) had a post-high school certificate or diploma, and 78 (24.5%) people exclusively held high school qualifications. 36 people (11.3%) earned over $100,000 compared to 12.1% nationally. The employment status of those at least 15 was 177 (55.7%) full-time, 60 (18.9%) part-time, and 6 (1.9%) unemployed.
