= Te Poi =

Settlement in Waikato, New Zealand

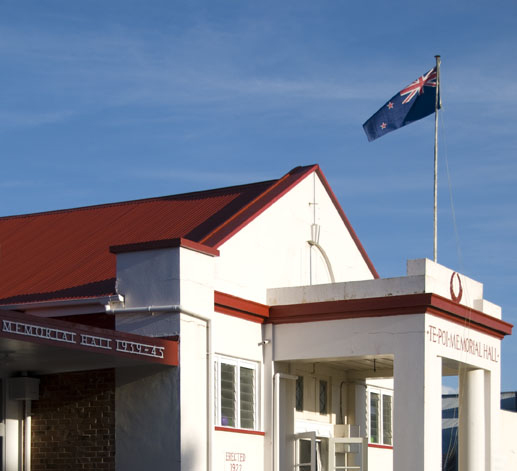
- Te Poi Memorial Hall
- Interactive map of Te Poi
- Country: New Zealand
- Region: Waikato
- Territorial authority: Matamata-Piako District
- Ward: Matamata General Ward
- Electorates: Waikato; Hauraki-Waikato (Māori)

Government
  - Territorial Authority: Matamata-Piako District Council
  - Regional council: Waikato Regional Council
  - Mayor of Matamata-Piako: Ash Tanner
  - Waikato MP: Tim van de Molen
  - Hauraki-Waikato MP: Hana-Rawhiti Maipi-Clarke

Area
  - Total: 12.25 km^{2} (4.73 sq mi)

Population (2023 Census)
  - Total: 231
  - Density: 18.9/km^{2} (48.8/sq mi)
- Time zone: UTC+12 (NZST)
  - Summer (DST): UTC+13 (NZDT)
- Postcode: 3401
- Area code: 07

Te Poi is a small village in rural Waikato, New Zealand, established in 1912 at the base of the Kaimai Range. Te Poi is part of a thriving farming area, particularly for dairying, thoroughbred horse breeding and cropping.

The village is serviced by a cafe, a pub/restaurant, a small supermarket and many other small businesses, and has a public tennis court. There are trout fishing spots nearby.

From Te Poi, it is 40 minutes to Tauranga, 35 minutes to Rotorua, 45 minutes to Hamilton, two hours to skiing at Mount Ruapehu on the Central Plateau and two hours to Auckland.

== History and culture ==
Te Poi built a memorial hall in 1922 to commemorate fallen soldiers from World War I. It built another memorial hall to commemorate its fallen sons from World War II.

Te Poi was the site of the Sunny Park-Hinuera Cooperative Dairy Company, known for its casein production. In 1983 Sunny Park buildings were auctioned off after the merger with the Waikato Dairy Company. The village has weathered the loss of the factory well due to its central location.

The town celebrated its district centenary on 31 March 2012.

=== Marae ===
Te Poi has three marae, affiliated with Ngāti Raukawa hapū. Rengarenga Marae is affiliated with Ngāti Mōtai and Ngāti Te Apunga. Te Omeka Marae and Tiriki Teihaua meeting house are affiliated with Ngāti Kirihika. Te Ūkaipō Marae and Wehiwehi meeting house are affiliated with Ngāti Kirihika and Ngāti Wehiwehi.

== Demographics ==
Te Poi settlement and its surrounds cover 12.25 km^{2} (4.73 sq mi). It is part of the larger Te Poi statistical area.

Historical population for Te Poi settlement and surrounds
Year	Pop.	±% p.a.
2006	180	—
2013	192	+0.93%
2018	210	+1.81%
2023	231	+1.92%

Te Poi had a population of 231 in the 2023 New Zealand census, an increase of 21 people (10.0%) since the 2018 census, and an increase of 39 people (20.3%) since the 2013 census. There were 123 males and 108 females in 81 dwellings. 3.9% of people identified as LGBTIQ+. The median age was 38.0 years (compared with 38.1 years nationally). There were 48 people (20.8%) aged under 15 years, 36 (15.6%) aged 15 to 29, 120 (51.9%) aged 30 to 64, and 24 (10.4%) aged 65 or older.

People could identify as more than one ethnicity. The results were 89.6% European (Pākehā); 22.1% Māori; 1.3% Pasifika; 2.6% Asian; 1.3% Middle Eastern, Latin American and African New Zealanders (MELAA); and 2.6% other, which includes people giving their ethnicity as "New Zealander". English was spoken by 96.1%, Māori language by 9.1%, and other languages by 3.9%. No language could be spoken by 2.6% (e.g. too young to talk). The percentage of people born overseas was 10.4, compared with 28.8% nationally.

Religious affiliations were 27.3% Christian, and 1.3% Māori religious beliefs. People who answered that they had no religion were 57.1%, and 14.3% of people did not answer the census question.

Of those at least 15 years old, 27 (14.8%) people had a bachelor's or higher degree, 108 (59.0%) had a post-high school certificate or diploma, and 48 (26.2%) people exclusively held high school qualifications. The median income was $46,400, compared with $41,500 nationally. 15 people (8.2%) earned over $100,000 compared to 12.1% nationally. The employment status of those at least 15 was that 108 (59.0%) people were employed full-time, 27 (14.8%) were part-time, and 3 (1.6%) were unemployed.

=== Te Poi statistical area ===
Te Poi statistical area covers 127.97 km^{2} (49.41 sq mi) and had an estimated population of 940 as of June 2025, with a population density of 7.3 people per km^{2}.

Historical population for the statistical area
Year	Pop.	±% p.a.
2006	819	—
2013	801	−0.32%
2018	840	+0.96%
2023	885	+1.05%

Te Poi statistical area had a population of 885 in the 2023 New Zealand census, an increase of 45 people (5.4%) since the 2018 census, and an increase of 84 people (10.5%) since the 2013 census. There were 459 males and 426 females in 294 dwellings. 2.7% of people identified as LGBTIQ+. The median age was 34.9 years (compared with 38.1 years nationally). There were 204 people (23.1%) aged under 15 years, 156 (17.6%) aged 15 to 29, 432 (48.8%) aged 30 to 64, and 90 (10.2%) aged 65 or older.

People could identify as more than one ethnicity. The results were 84.7% European (Pākehā); 22.7% Māori; 2.0% Pasifika; 4.4% Asian; 0.7% Middle Eastern, Latin American and African New Zealanders (MELAA); and 2.0% other, which includes people giving their ethnicity as "New Zealander". English was spoken by 96.6%, Māori language by 6.8%, Samoan by 0.3%, and other languages by 4.1%. No language could be spoken by 2.7% (e.g. too young to talk). New Zealand Sign Language was known by 0.7%. The percentage of people born overseas was 12.5, compared with 28.8% nationally.

Religious affiliations were 30.8% Christian, 0.3% Islam, 3.7% Māori religious beliefs, 0.3% New Age, and 0.3% other religions. People who answered that they had no religion were 56.6%, and 8.1% of people did not answer the census question.

Of those at least 15 years old, 114 (16.7%) people had a bachelor's or higher degree, 381 (55.9%) had a post-high school certificate or diploma, and 186 (27.3%) people exclusively held high school qualifications. The median income was $49,000, compared with $41,500 nationally. 75 people (11.0%) earned over $100,000 compared to 12.1% nationally. The employment status of those at least 15 was that 402 (59.0%) people were employed full-time, 111 (16.3%) were part-time, and 9 (1.3%) were unemployed.

== Education ==
Te Poi School is a co-educational state primary school for Year 1 to 6 students, with a roll of 58 as of July 2026. The school was open by 1918.

Older children go to Matamata by bus for intermediate and secondary school.
