= New Zealand state highway network =

Administered by the NZ Transport Agency

The New Zealand state highway shield

The New Zealand state highway network is the major national highway network in New Zealand. Nearly 100 roads in the North and South Islands are state highways. All state highways are administered by the NZ Transport Agency Waka Kotahi.

The highways were originally designated using a two-tier system, national (SH 1 to 8) and provincial, with national highways having a higher standard and funding priorities. Now all are state highways, and the network consists of SH 1 running the length of both islands, SH 2 to 5 and 10 to 59 in the North Island, and SH 6 to 8 and 60 to 99 in the South Island, numbered approximately north to south. State highways are marked by red shield-shaped signs with white numbering (shields for the former provincial highways were blue). Road maps usually number state highways in this fashion.

Of the total state highway network, New Zealand currently has 363 km (226 mi) of motorways and expressways with grade-separated access and they carry ten percent of all New Zealand traffic. The majority of the state highway network is made up of single-carriageway roads with one lane each way and at-grade access.

A typical New Zealand state highway junction sign: State Highways 1 and 85 meet in Palmerston, Otago.

== History ==
In the early days all roads were managed by local road boards. Initially they were set up by the provinces. For example, Auckland Province passed a Highways Act in 1862 allowing their Superintendent to define given areas of settlement as Highways Districts, each with a board of trustees elected by the landowners. Land within the boundaries of highway districts became subject to a rate of not more than 1/- an acre, or of 3d in the £ of its estimated sale value and that was to be equalled by a grant from the province. By 1913 the government was collecting £28,000 (equivalent to $2,500,000 in 2026) in duty on cars, but spending £40,000 ($3,500,000) on roads.

The idea of a national network of highways did not emerge until the early twentieth century, when a series of pieces of legislation was passed to allow for the designation of main highways (starting with the Main Highways Act 1922, followed by gazetting of roads) and state highways (in 1936). This saw the National Roads Board, an arm of the Ministry of Works, responsible for the state highway network.

From 1989 to 2008, state highways were the responsibility of Transit New Zealand, a Crown entity. In 1996 the funding of the network was removed from the operational functions with the creation of Transfund New Zealand, which then merged with the Land Transport Safety Authority to create Land Transport New Zealand. That was done to ensure that funding of state highways was considered on a similar basis to funding for local roads and regional council subsidised public transport. In August 2008, Transit and Land Transport NZ merged to become the NZ Transport Agency.

Every five years the NZ Transport Agency will embark on a state highway review to consider whether the existing network should be expanded or reduced, according to traffic flows, changes in industry, tourism and development.

From 2009 many new road schemes were classed as Roads of National Significance and, from 2020, as part of the New Zealand Upgrade Programme.

== Classification ==
Since 2013, the NZTA has used the One Network Road Classification (ONRC) system to classify state highways and local roads. There are five categories for state highways, with an additional sixth category (Access) used only by local roads. The categories are as follows:

- National: Generally these roads link the country's largest urban areas (population greater than 100,000) major ports and major airports. They generally have an annual average daily traffic volume (AADT) of 15,000 or more. Examples includes most of SH 1, SH 29, the Wellington–Palmerston North–Napier route (SH 57, SH 3, SH 2, SH 50A and SH 50) and most State Highways in the Auckland, Wellington and Christchurch urban areas.
- Regional: Generally these roads link the country's main urban areas (population greater than 30,000), medium-sized ports, medium-sized airports, and major tourist destinations, or are the major route linking an isolated region. They generally have an AADT of 10,000 or more. Examples include most of SH 2 and SH 3, SH 5, SH 73, and Queenstown–Milford Sound route (SH 6, SH 97 and SH 94).
- Arterial: Generally these roads link the country's secondary urban areas (population greater than 10,000), medium-sized ports and regional airports, or are the only route linking an isolated area or provide an important detour function. They generally have an AADT of 3000 or more. Examples includes most of SH 6, SH 8, SH 27, and the SH 1 Desert Road detour (SH 46, SH 47, SH 4 and SH 49)
- Primary collector: Generally these roads link the country's minor urban areas (population greater than 2000). They generally have an AADT of 1000 or more. Examples includes most of SH 4, SH 7, SH 35, and SH 83.
- Secondary collector: Generally these roads link rural towns (population less than 2000) or rural areas. They generally have an AADT of less than 1000. Examples include SH 43, SH 63, SH 85 and SH 87.

== Volumes ==
From 2006 information, the busiest stretch of SH 1 was just south of the Auckland Central Motorway Junction, on/near the Newmarket Viaduct, with over 200,000 vehicles (either way) each day. The least busy parts of the network (excluding off-ramps and on-ramps) are on SH 43 north-east of Whangamōmona, with fewer than 120 vehicles (counting both directions) in a day.

The only remaining unsealed sections of state highway are 12 km (7.5 mi) of SH 43 and 20 km (12 mi) of SH 38, though 38% of other roads remain unsealed.

Every year the New Zealand Transport Agency produces a booklet titled AADT Data, average annualised daily traffic, that gives traffic volumes on all state highways from their automated vehicle recording system.

== Distance markers ==
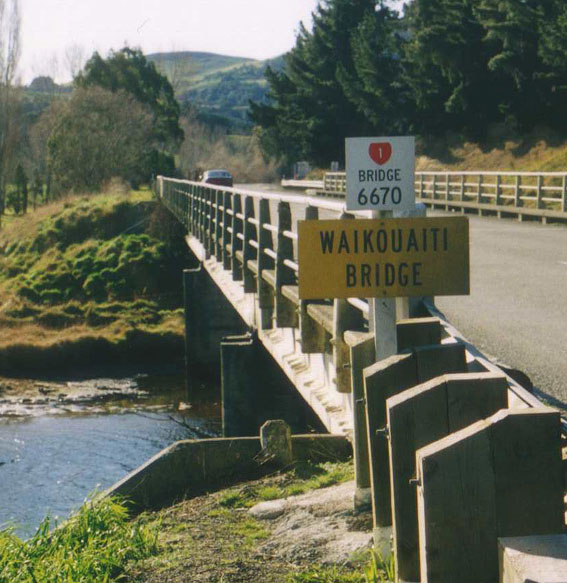
State Highway 1 crosses the Waikouaiti River in Otago, 667.0 kilometres from Picton.

State highways are marked with posts at irregular intervals giving the distance in kilometres from the start of the highway. Until recently, all bridges on the network had at each end a small plaque showing the distance from the start of the highway, usually in the form of a number in kilometres, an oblique stroke, and a further number in kilometres, accurate to the nearest 10 metres. A plaque marked 237/14.12, for example, indicated that the bridge was 14.12 km (9 mi) past a set distance post, that post being 237 km (147 mi) from the start of the highway. In about 2004 these plaques were replaced by a new system, which gives each bridge a single number showing the distance from the start of the highway in hundreds of metres. Under the new system the bridge above would be numbered 2511, as it is 251 km (156 mi) km from the start of the highway. Motorway on- and off-ramps are numbered using the same system.

In this way, travellers can accurately assess their location, and road authorities can identify each bridge uniquely.

Sometimes, houses with RAPID numbering can also be used to determine the position. For example, house number 1530 is 15.3 km (10 mi) from the start of the highway.

== Safety ==
In early 2008, Transit New Zealand unveiled KiwiRAP (the New Zealand Road Assessment Programme) in cooperation with other government agencies and the New Zealand Automobile Association. The system, based on similar programs overseas, categorises New Zealand state highways according to the safety of discrete 'links' (sections of the network, with a total of 10,856 km of highways separated into 172 links ranging in length from 2.4 km (1 mi) to 318 km (198 mi)). These are graded according to their 'individual risk' and their 'collective risk' based on historical crash data and traffic volumes.

The individual risk is based on the likelihood of a single driver experiencing an accident while travelling the link in question. As of 2008, the three least safe sections of the network based on individual risk were State Highway 62 from Spring Creek to Renwick (Marlborough), State Highway 37 to Waitomo Caves and State Highway 94 from Te Anau to Milford Sound.

The collective risk is based on the total number of crashes that occurred on the link, which pushes safer but very highly travelled sections of the network to the top of the statistical category. As of 2008, the three least safe sections of the network based on collective risk were all on State Highway 2, on the sections from Napier to Hastings, Mount Maunganui to Paengaroa and Bay View to Napier.

Both categories of assessment are to be used as an advisory tool for both drivers to inform them of dangerous road sections as well as to allow traffic controlling authorities to prioritise maintenance and safety improvements.

The 2015–18 National Land Transport Programme aimed to invest $3.2bn (23% of the NLTP total) in safety, including $960m for policing, $132m for road safety promotion and $103m for rural SH safety. The Safe Roads Alliance is carrying out rural work on SH 1 (Waikato Expressway, Te Teko-Awakeri), SH 1B (Taupiri-Gordonton), SH 3 (Ohaupo-Te Awamutu, Waitomo-Te Kuiti), SH 11 (Airfield-Lily Pond), SH 12 (Dargaville-Tokatoka), SH 16 (Brigham Creek-Waimauku), SH 23 (Hamilton-Raglan), SH 27 (SH 26-SH 24) and SH 34 (SH 30 to Kawerau). The Alliance is using speed reductions, wire rope barriers, wide centrelines, rumble strips, better warning signs and shoulder widening.

== Specific sections ==
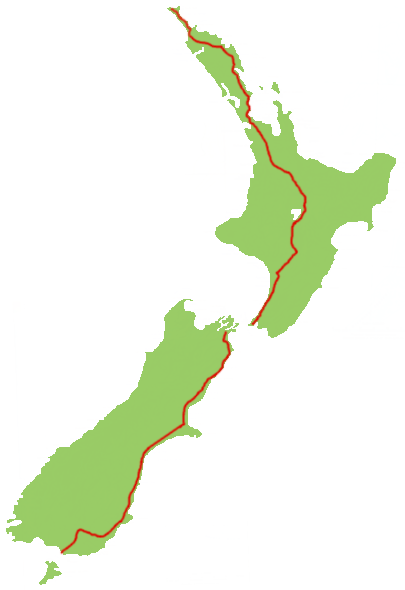
State Highway 1

=== State Highway 1 ===
State Highway 1 can be considered as a single highway running the length of both main islands, broken in the middle by the ferry connection at Cook Strait. It connects five of the seven largest urban areas and includes the country's busiest stretch of road.

=== Touring routes ===
Many sections of state highway provided are marketed as tourist highways, sometimes jointly with local roading providers. Transit maintains traffic signs on and near state highways to help promote these routes. As of 2025, there are eight touring routes using State Highways:

- Adventure Highway – SH 49 and SH 4 from Waiouru to Eight Mile Junction (near Te Kūiti)
- Twin Coast Discovery Highway – ring route around the Auckland and Northland regions.
- Pacific Coast Highway – route going around the north-east coast of the North Island, joining Auckland and Napier.
- Thermal Explorer Highway – route going from Auckland to Napier through the geothermally active centre of the North Island.
- Classic New Zealand Wine Trail – a route through three of New Zealand's major wine regions, from Napier to Blenheim, via Hastings, Woodville, Masterton, Martinborough, Wellington, and Picton. Requires a ferry crossing across Cook Strait between Wellington and Picton.
- Southern Scenic Route – route going along the southern coast of the South Island from Dunedin via the Catlins, Invercargill and Riverton to Te Anau.
- Volcanic Loop Highway – A loop around the Tongariro National Park, passing through Waiouru, Ohakune, Waimarino, and Tūrangi. Then continuing to Taupō.
- Starlight Highway – route from Fairlie to Mt Cook in the Mackenzie District of Canterbury in the South Island. This route includes SH 80 and parts of SH 8. In recognition of the area being an international dark sky reserve (Aoraki Mackenzie International Dark Sky Reserve).

Some state highways have alternative names, but are not touring routes. These include:

- Surf Highway – alternative name for SH 45 from New Plymouth to Hāwera. Named due to the number of surf breaks along the Taranaki coastline.
- Alpine Pacific Triangle – a triangular loop including sections of SH 1, 7 and Route 70 linking the popular destinations of Hanmer Springs, Kaikōura and Waipara.
- Inland Scenic Route – formerly SH 72, this road goes from Amberley to Winchester (near Timaru). This road follows around the foot of the Canterbury Foothills, inland on the Canterbury plains.
- Great Alpine Highway – Highway 73 going from Christchurch in Canterbury over the Southern Alps via Arthur's Pass to Kumara Junction on the West Coast.

== See also ==
- List of New Zealand state highways
