= Springdale, New Zealand =

Locality in Waikato, New Zealand

Springdale
- Interactive map of Springdale
- Coordinates: 37°31′45″S 175°34′00″E
- Country: New Zealand
- Region: Waikato
- District: Matamata-Piako District
- Wards: Te Aroha General Ward; Morrinsville General Ward
- Electorates: Waikato; Hauraki-Waikato (Māori)

Government
  - Territorial Authority: Matamata-Piako District Council
  - Regional council: Waikato Regional Council
  - Mayor of Matamata-Piako: Ash Tanner
  - Waikato MP: Tim van de Molen
  - Hauraki-Waikato MP: Hana-Rawhiti Maipi-Clarke

Area
  - Total: 51.94 km^{2} (20.05 sq mi)

Population (2023 Census)
  - Total: 390
  - Density: 7.5/km^{2} (19/sq mi)

Springdale is a rural community in the Matamata-Piako District and Waikato region of New Zealand's North Island.

It is located north-west of Tatuanui, north of Morrinsville and east of Tahuna near State Highway 27.

== Etymology ==
Springdale was originally known as Lower Waitoa. In 1912 the settlers' association decided to change the name: the two suggestions were Frogmore (due to the amount of frogs in the area) and Springfield (due to a nearby hot spring), Springfield was chosen but the name was altered to Springdale due to Springfield already being in use for a town in the South Island.

== History ==
Springdale was established following the subdivision of the Balachraggan estate.

The area was very swampy in the early 20th century, but has been gradually been developed into productive farmland.

== Demographics ==
Springdale covers 51.94 km^{2} (20.05 sq mi). The area is split between the larger Mangaiti and Tahuna-Mangataparu statistical areas.

Historical population of Springdale and surrounds
Year	Pop.	±% p.a.
2006	414	—
2013	384	−1.07%
2018	402	+0.92%
2023	390	−0.60%

Springdale had a population of 390 in the 2023 New Zealand census, a decrease of 12 people (−3.0%) since the 2018 census, and an increase of 6 people (1.6%) since the 2013 census. There were 195 males and 195 females in 144 dwellings. 1.5% of people identified as LGBTIQ+. There were 93 people (23.8%) aged under 15 years, 63 (16.2%) aged 15 to 29, 192 (49.2%) aged 30 to 64, and 42 (10.8%) aged 65 or older.

People could identify as more than one ethnicity. The results were 91.5% European (Pākehā), 10.0% Māori, 2.3% Pasifika, 3.8% Asian, and 1.5% other, which includes people giving their ethnicity as "New Zealander". English was spoken by 96.9%, Māori language by 2.3%, and other languages by 6.2%. No language could be spoken by 1.5% (e.g. too young to talk). The percentage of people born overseas was 11.5, compared with 28.8% nationally.

Religious affiliations were 25.4% Christian, 1.5% Islam, 0.8% New Age, and 1.5% other religions. People who answered that they had no religion were 60.8%, and 10.8% of people did not answer the census question.

Of those at least 15 years old, 33 (11.1%) people had a bachelor's or higher degree, 174 (58.6%) had a post-high school certificate or diploma, and 96 (32.3%) people exclusively held high school qualifications. 30 people (10.1%) earned over $100,000 compared to 12.1% nationally. The employment status of those at least 15 was that 168 (56.6%) people were employed full-time, 51 (17.2%) were part-time, and 6 (2.0%) were unemployed.

=== Mangaiti statistical area ===
Mangaiti statistical area covers a rural area north and west of Te Aroha. It has an area of 257.28 km^{2} (99.34 sq mi) and an estimated population of 1,490 as of June 2025, with a population density of 5.8 people per km^{2}.

Historical population of Mangaiti
Year	Pop.	±% p.a.
2006	1,380	—
2013	1,284	−1.02%
2018	1,335	+0.78%
2023	1,362	+0.40%
The 2006 population is for a larger area of 258.11 km^{2}. Source:

Mangaiti had a population of 1,362 in the 2023 New Zealand census, an increase of 27 people (2.0%) since the 2018 census, and an increase of 78 people (6.1%) since the 2013 census. There were 705 males and 657 females in 498 dwellings. 1.8% of people identified as LGBTIQ+. The median age was 36.8 years (compared with 38.1 years nationally). There were 300 people (22.0%) aged under 15 years, 237 (17.4%) aged 15 to 29, 633 (46.5%) aged 30 to 64, and 192 (14.1%) aged 65 or older.

People could identify as more than one ethnicity. The results were 86.6% European (Pākehā); 17.6% Māori; 2.2% Pasifika; 5.1% Asian; 1.1% Middle Eastern, Latin American and African New Zealanders (MELAA); and 1.8% other, which includes people giving their ethnicity as "New Zealander". English was spoken by 96.9%, Māori language by 3.3%, and other languages by 6.8%. No language could be spoken by 2.2% (e.g. too young to talk). New Zealand Sign Language was known by 0.2%. The percentage of people born overseas was 13.9, compared with 28.8% nationally.

Religious affiliations were 23.8% Christian, 0.9% Hindu, 0.4% Islam, 0.2% Māori religious beliefs, 0.7% Buddhist, 0.2% New Age, and 0.9% other religions. People who answered that they had no religion were 65.0%, and 7.7% of people did not answer the census question.

Of those at least 15 years old, 123 (11.6%) people had a bachelor's or higher degree, 585 (55.1%) had a post-high school certificate or diploma, and 345 (32.5%) people exclusively held high school qualifications. The median income was $44,500, compared with $41,500 nationally. 105 people (9.9%) earned over $100,000 compared to 12.1% nationally. The employment status of those at least 15 was that 585 (55.1%) people were employed full-time, 186 (17.5%) were part-time, and 21 (2.0%) were unemployed.

== Education ==
Springdale School is a co-educational state primary school for Year 1 to 8 students, with a roll of 32 as of July 2026.

In 1915 Springdale School was built with a roll of 29. Just six months later it had grown to 55 pupils who had just one small classroom. In 1975 the school celebrated its diamond jubilee, it was attended by over 1,000 former pupils, residents, and staff, including Mervyn Anderson, the first registered pupil. Springdale school celebrated its centenary in 2015. Del Parton, who attended the school from 1927 to 1934, was the oldest living former pupil at the event.

The school has received funding from gaming machine charities.

Despite its rural location, students had access to Ultra-Fast Broadband and tablet computers before many other schools.

Teachers at the school have gone on to become long-time principals and senior teachers in other parts of the country.

The school has regular dress-up days.
