= Waitoa =

Settlement in Waikato, New Zealand

- Interactive map of Waitoa
- Coordinates: 37.601°S 175.628°E
- Country: New Zealand
- Region: Waikato Region
- District: Matamata-Piako District
- Ward: Te Aroha General Ward
- Electorates: Waikato; Hauraki-Waikato (Māori)

Government
  - Territorial Authority: Matamata-Piako District Council
  - Regional council: Waikato Regional Council
  - Mayor of Matamata-Piako: Ash Tanner
  - Waikato MP: Tim van de Molen
  - Hauraki-Waikato MP: Hana-Rawhiti Maipi-Clarke

Area
  - Total: 2.53 km^{2} (0.98 sq mi)

Population (June 2025)
  - Total: 300
  - Density: 120/km^{2} (310/sq mi)

Waitoa is a settlement in the Matamata-Piako District of New Zealand. State Highway 26 runs through the town, and connects to Te Aroha 10 km to the north-east.

A Fonterra dairy factory is a prominent blue building in the middle of the town.

The Waitoa River runs through the village and is prone to flooding.

A railway line runs to the dairy factory, and used to go to Te Aroha, however this section was closed and the line only runs to service the dairy factory.

Two freezing works and a rendering plant also operate in the Waitoa area. Workers commute from nearby towns of Te Aroha, Morrinsville and Matamata.

== Demographics ==
Statistics New Zealand describes Waitoa as a rural settlement, which covers 2.53 km^{2} (0.98 sq mi) and had an estimated population of 300 as of June 2025, with a population density of 119 people per km^{2}. Waitoa is part of the larger Waitoa-Ngarua statistical area.

Historical population for Waitoa
Year	Pop.	±% p.a.
2006	291	—
2013	258	−1.70%
2018	264	+0.46%
2023	282	+1.33%
The 2006 population is for a larger area of 3.99 km^{2}. Source:

Waitoa had a population of 282 in the 2023 New Zealand census, an increase of 18 people (6.8%) since the 2018 census, and an increase of 24 people (9.3%) since the 2013 census. There were 153 males and 129 females in 99 dwellings. 1.1% of people identified as LGBTIQ+. The median age was 36.6 years (compared with 38.1 years nationally). There were 63 people (22.3%) aged under 15 years, 51 (18.1%) aged 15 to 29, 126 (44.7%) aged 30 to 64, and 39 (13.8%) aged 65 or older.

People could identify as more than one ethnicity. The results were 81.9% European (Pākehā); 24.5% Māori; 5.3% Pasifika; 7.4% Asian; 1.1% Middle Eastern, Latin American and African New Zealanders (MELAA); and 2.1% other, which includes people giving their ethnicity as "New Zealander". English was spoken by 95.7%, Māori language by 7.4%, and other languages by 7.4%. No language could be spoken by 3.2% (e.g. too young to talk). The percentage of people born overseas was 8.5, compared with 28.8% nationally.

Religious affiliations were 20.2% Christian, 1.1% Islam, 4.3% Māori religious beliefs, 2.1% Buddhist, and 1.1% other religions. People who answered that they had no religion were 64.9%, and 6.4% of people did not answer the census question.

Of those at least 15 years old, 12 (5.5%) people had a bachelor's or higher degree, 117 (53.4%) had a post-high school certificate or diploma, and 84 (38.4%) people exclusively held high school qualifications. The median income was $36,500, compared with $41,500 nationally. 12 people (5.5%) earned over $100,000 compared to 12.1% nationally. The employment status of those at least 15 was that 114 (52.1%) people were employed full-time and 24 (11.0%) were part-time.

=== Waitoa-Ngarua statistical area ===
Waitoa-Ngarua statistical area covers 108.08 km^{2} (41.73 sq mi) and had an estimated population of 1,230 as of June 2025, with a population density of 11 people per km^{2}.

Historical population for Waitoa-Ngarua
Year	Pop.	±% p.a.
2006	1,296	—
2013	1,152	−1.67%
2018	1,176	+0.41%
2023	1,137	−0.67%
The 2006 population is for a smaller area of 107.27 km^{2}. Source:

Waitoa-Ngarua had a population of 1,137 in the 2023 New Zealand census, a decrease of 39 people (−3.3%) since the 2018 census, and a decrease of 15 people (−1.3%) since the 2013 census. There were 624 males, 513 females and 3 people of other genders in 429 dwellings. 2.9% of people identified as LGBTIQ+. The median age was 36.6 years (compared with 38.1 years nationally). There were 234 people (20.6%) aged under 15 years, 234 (20.6%) aged 15 to 29, 528 (46.4%) aged 30 to 64, and 147 (12.9%) aged 65 or older.

People could identify as more than one ethnicity. The results were 78.6% European (Pākehā); 16.1% Māori; 6.1% Pasifika; 10.8% Asian; 1.6% Middle Eastern, Latin American and African New Zealanders (MELAA); and 1.1% other, which includes people giving their ethnicity as "New Zealander". English was spoken by 95.8%, Māori language by 4.0%, and other languages by 11.9%. No language could be spoken by 2.9% (e.g. too young to talk). The percentage of people born overseas was 18.7, compared with 28.8% nationally.

Religious affiliations were 28.8% Christian, 1.8% Hindu, 0.3% Islam, 1.8% Māori religious beliefs, 0.5% Buddhist, 0.3% New Age, and 2.4% other religions. People who answered that they had no religion were 54.9%, and 9.2% of people did not answer the census question.

Of those at least 15 years old, 120 (13.3%) people had a bachelor's or higher degree, 504 (55.8%) had a post-high school certificate or diploma, and 288 (31.9%) people exclusively held high school qualifications. The median income was $46,200, compared with $41,500 nationally. 81 people (9.0%) earned over $100,000 compared to 12.1% nationally. The employment status of those at least 15 was that 501 (55.5%) people were employed full-time, 120 (13.3%) were part-time, and 15 (1.7%) were unemployed.

== Education ==
Waitoa had a primary school between 1904 and 2015. It opened as Waitoa Valley School and reached a roll of 222 students in 1959. The roll fell subsequently, and there were 18 students in the final year.
