= Mangateparu =

- Interactive map of Mangateparu
- Coordinates: 37°35′21.69″S 175°30′08.09″E
- Country: New Zealand
- Region: Waikato
- District: Matamata-Piako District
- Ward: Morrinsville General Ward
- Electorates: Waikato; Hauraki-Waikato (Māori)

Government
  - Territorial Authority: Matamata-Piako District Council
  - Regional council: Waikato Regional Council
  - Mayor of Matamata-Piako: Ash Tanner
  - Waikato MP: Tim van de Molen
  - Hauraki-Waikato MP: Hana-Rawhiti Maipi-Clarke

Area
  - Total: 23.54 km^{2} (9.09 sq mi)

Population (2023 Census)
  - Total: 357
  - Density: 15.2/km^{2} (39.3/sq mi)
- Time zone: UTC+12 (NZST)
  - Summer (DST): UTC+13 (NZDT)
- Area code: 07

Mangateparu is a settlement nestled at the foot of the Hangawera Hills, north of Morrinsville, New Zealand.

== Etymology ==
The name comes from the Māori words manga (stream), te (the) and paru (muddy or deep).

== History ==
In 1876, 2,000 acres (810 ha) of land at Mangateparu was owned by an Alsatian settler. 30 years later, Alexander Bell purchased 5,500 acres (2,200 ha) of land, cleared out the bush and subdivided it into 150 to 200 acres (61 to 81 ha) sections. The Crown later purchased these sections in 1917 and used it to rehabilitate returned soldiers. Mangateparu was one of the largest soldier settlements in New Zealand.

== Demographics ==
Mangateparu and its surrounds cover 23.54 km^{2} (9.09 sq mi). Mangateparu is part of the larger Tahuna-Mangateparu statistical area.

Historical population for Mangateparu and surrounds
Year	Pop.	±% p.a.
2006	285	—
2013	288	+0.15%
2018	306	+1.22%
2023	357	+3.13%

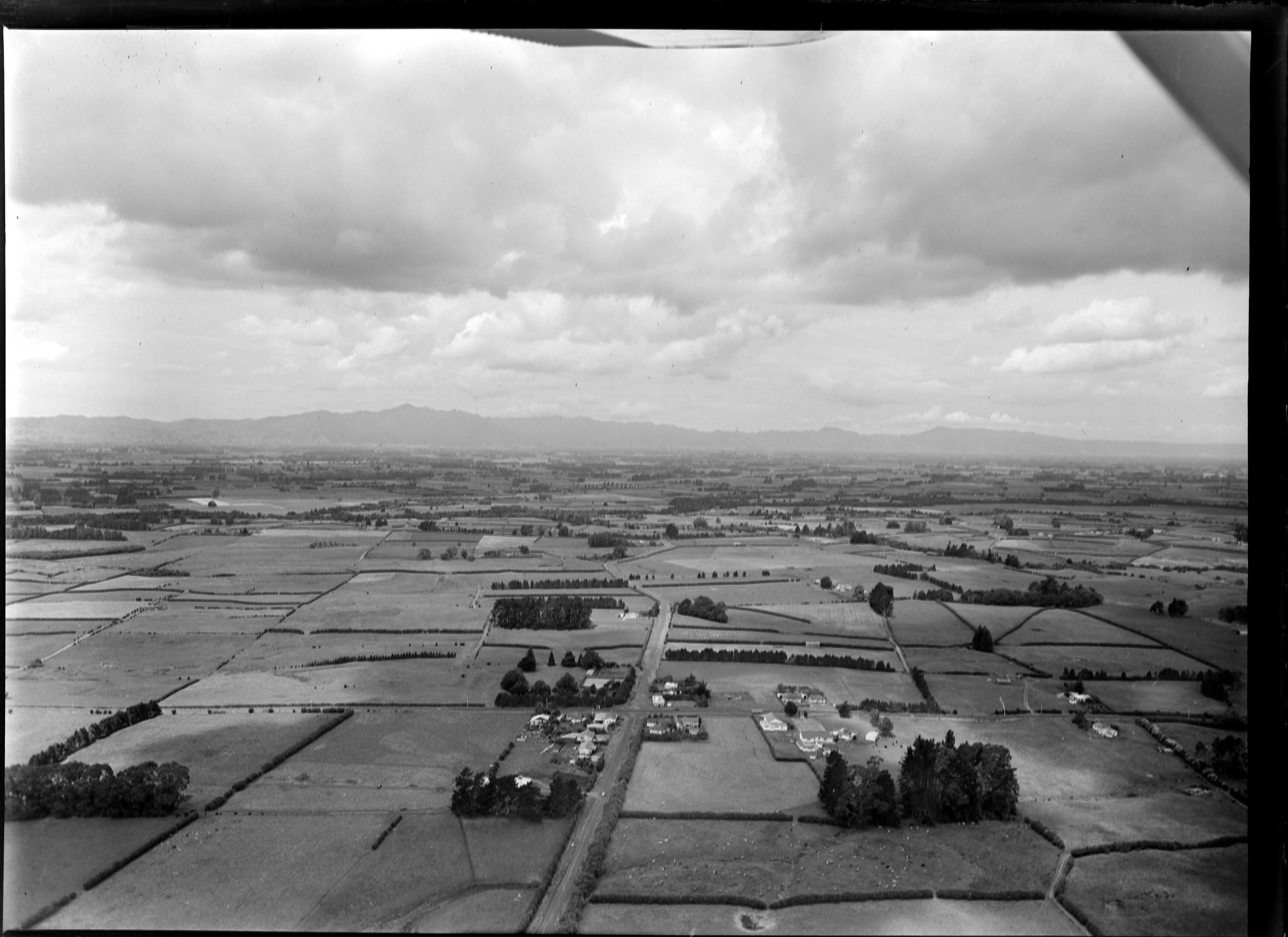
Aerial view of Mangateparu

Mangateparu had a population of 357 in the 2023 New Zealand census, an increase of 51 people (16.7%) since the 2018 census, and an increase of 69 people (24.0%) since the 2013 census. There were 180 males and 177 females in 108 dwellings. 3.4% of people identified as LGBTIQ+. There were 90 people (25.2%) aged under 15 years, 63 (17.6%) aged 15 to 29, 162 (45.4%) aged 30 to 64, and 42 (11.8%) aged 65 or older.

People could identify as more than one ethnicity. The results were 88.2% European (Pākehā); 16.0% Māori; 0.8% Pasifika; 5.0% Asian; and 0.8% Middle Eastern, Latin American and African New Zealanders (MELAA). English was spoken by 97.5%, Māori language by 2.5%, and other languages by 7.6%. No language could be spoken by 2.5% (e.g. too young to talk). The percentage of people born overseas was 12.6, compared with 28.8% nationally.

Religious affiliations were 25.2% Christian, 3.4% Hindu, 0.8% Islam, 0.8% New Age, 0.8% Jewish, and 1.7% other religions. People who answered that they had no religion were 60.5%, and 8.4% of people did not answer the census question.

Of those at least 15 years old, 42 (15.7%) people had a bachelor's or higher degree, 168 (62.9%) had a post-high school certificate or diploma, and 66 (24.7%) people exclusively held high school qualifications. 33 people (12.4%) earned over $100,000 compared to 12.1% nationally. The employment status of those at least 15 was that 159 (59.6%) people were employed full-time, 45 (16.9%) were part-time, and 12 (4.5%) were unemployed.

== Education ==
In 1909 a school opened on private property in a workman's hut. The school continued until a part time school was opened in 1912. It closed following the opening of a school in Tauhei. In 1922 a new school was opened in 1922 following Tauhei and Mangateparu being split into separate school districts. It closed at the beginning of 2005.
