= Matamata (disambiguation) =

Matamata is a town in Waikato, New Zealand

Matamata, Mata-Mata or mata mata may also refer to:

== New Zealand ==
- Matamata Ward, in the Matamata-Piako District
- Matamata Airport
- Matamata College, secondary school
- Matamata Swifts, football club
- Matamata (New Zealand electorate), former parliamentary electorate

== Other uses ==
- Kampong Mata-Mata, village in Brunei
- Mata mata, freshwater turtle
