= Matamata, New Zealand (disambiguation) =

Matamata is a town in Waikato, North Island, New Zealand. It may subsequently refer to:

- Matamata-Piako District, territorial authority for Matamata
- Matamata Airport
- Matamata College, secondary school
- Matamata Swifts, football club
- Matamata (New Zealand electorate), former parliamentary electorate
