= Matamata-Piako District =

- Territorial authority district
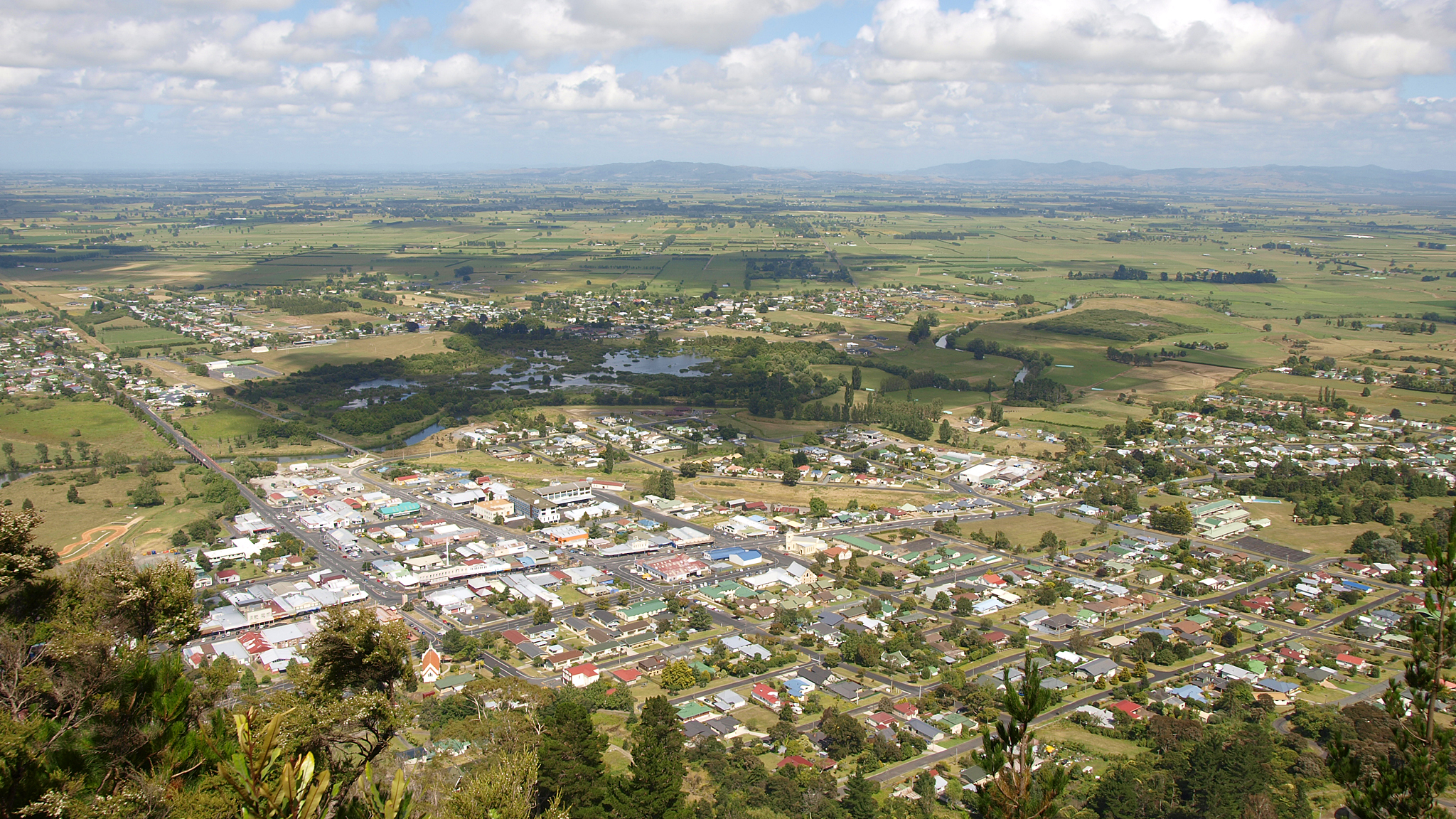
- Te Aroha

- Matamata-Piako district within the North Island
- Country: New Zealand
- Region: Waikato
- Wards: Matamata; Morrinsville; Te Aroha; Te Toa Horopū ā Matamata-Piako (Māori)
- Seat: Te Aroha

Government
  - Mayor: Ash Tanner
  - Territorial authority: Matamata-Piako District Council

Area
  - Land: 1,755.35 km^{2} (677.74 sq mi)

Population (June 2025)
  - Total: 39,200
  - Density: 22.3/km^{2} (57.8/sq mi)
- Time zone: UTC+12 (NZST)
  - Summer (DST): UTC+13 (NZDT)
- Postcode(s): Map of postcodes
- Website: Matamata-Piako District Council

Matamata-Piako District is a local government area in the Waikato region of New Zealand. It lies to the east of the city of Hamilton.

== Geography ==
The district encompasses the southern end of the Hauraki Plains and much of the Thames Valley, and is bounded in the east by the Kaimai Range. The rivers Piako and Waihou run through the district.

The towns of Matamata, Morrinsville and Te Aroha are all within the district, with the Council's head office based in Te Aroha. The main industry in the region is dairy farming and Thoroughbred breeding and training. Other communities in the district include Mangateparu and Waitoa.

=== Populated places ===
Matamata-Piako District consists of the following towns, localities, settlements and communities:

- Matamata Ward:
  - Buckland
  - Gordon
  - Hinuera
  - Matai
  - Matamata
  - Okauia South
  - Okauia
  - Paratu
  - Peria
  - Piarere
  - Richmond Downs
  - Selwyn
  - Taihoa
  - Tamihana
  - Te Poi
  - Turangaomoana
  - Waharoa
  - Walton
  - Wardville
- Morrinsville Ward:
  - Hoe-O-Tainui
  - Kereone
  - Kiwitahi
  - Kuranui
  - Mangateparu
  - Morrinsville
  - Motumaoho
  - Piako
  - Rukumoana
  - Tahuna
  - Tahuroa
  - Tatuanui
  - Tauhei
  - Te Puninga
  - Waiti
- Te Aroha Ward:
  - Chudleigh
  - Elstow
  - Hungahunga
  - Manawaru
  - Mangaiti
  - Ngarua
  - Otway
  - Shaftesbury
  - Springdale
  - Te Aroha
  - Te Aroha West
  - Waihou
  - Waiorongomai
  - Wairakau
  - Waitoa

== Demographics ==
Matamata-Piako District covers 1,755.35 km^{2} (677.74 sq mi) and had an estimated population of 39,200 as of June 2025, with a population density of 22.3 people per km^{2}. 9,770 people live in Morrinsville, 9,540 in Matamata, and 4,730 in Te Aroha.

Historical population
Year	Pop.	±% p.a.
2006	30,483	—
2013	31,536	+0.49%
2018	34,404	+1.76%
2023	37,098	+1.52%

Matamata-Piako District had a population of 37,098 in the 2023 New Zealand census, an increase of 2,694 people (7.8%) since the 2018 census, and an increase of 5,562 people (17.6%) since the 2013 census. There were 18,360 males, 18,654 females and 81 people of other genders in 14,049 dwellings. 2.1% of people identified as LGBTIQ+. The median age was 40.8 years (compared with 38.1 years nationally). There were 7,302 people (19.7%) aged under 15 years, 6,189 (16.7%) aged 15 to 29, 15,618 (42.1%) aged 30 to 64, and 7,986 (21.5%) aged 65 or older.

People could identify as more than one ethnicity. The results were 83.3% European (Pākehā); 18.6% Māori; 2.6% Pasifika; 6.9% Asian; 0.9% Middle Eastern, Latin American and African New Zealanders (MELAA); and 2.0% other, which includes people giving their ethnicity as "New Zealander". English was spoken by 96.7%, Māori language by 4.1%, Samoan by 0.2% and other languages by 7.5%. No language could be spoken by 2.2% (e.g. too young to talk). New Zealand Sign Language was known by 0.5%. The percentage of people born overseas was 15.7, compared with 28.8% nationally.

Religious affiliations were 30.9% Christian, 0.9% Hindu, 0.4% Islam, 1.0% Māori religious beliefs, 0.9% Buddhist, 0.4% New Age, and 1.7% other religions. People who answered that they had no religion were 55.4%, and 8.4% of people did not answer the census question.

Of those at least 15 years old, 3,309 (11.1%) people had a bachelor's or higher degree, 16,698 (56.0%) had a post-high school certificate or diploma, and 8,826 (29.6%) people exclusively held high school qualifications. The median income was $40,000, compared with $41,500 nationally. 2,655 people (8.9%) earned over $100,000 compared to 12.1% nationally. The employment status of those at least 15 was that 14,922 (50.1%) people were employed full-time, 4,143 (13.9%) were part-time, and 621 (2.1%) were unemployed.

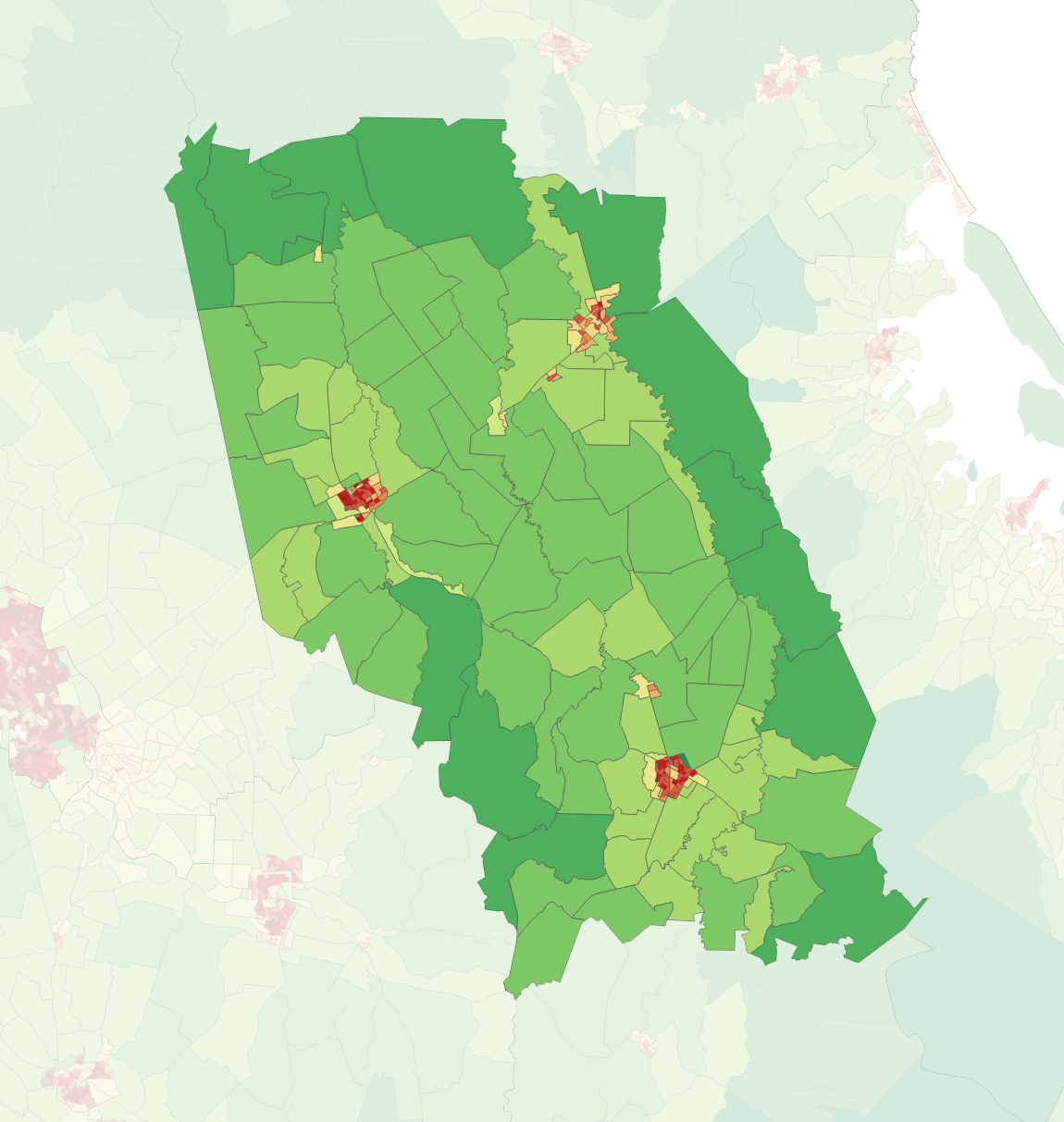
Population density in the 2023 census

Individual wards
Name	Area (km^{2})	Population	Density (per km^{2})	Dwellings	Median age	Median income
Morrinsville General Ward	573.00	13,782	24.1	5,058	37.7 years	$44,200
Te Aroha General Ward	517.10	8,430	16.3	3,285	43.4 years	$35,900
Matamata General Ward	665.25	14,883	22.4	5,706	42.7 years	$39,100
New Zealand					38.1 years	$41,500

== Twin cities ==
Matamata-Piako is twinned with:

Ballina, New South Wales, Australia
