= Waitoa River =

River in New Zealand

Coordinates: 37°28′26″S 175°32′2″E

Location
- Country: New Zealand

Physical characteristics
- Mouth
  - location: Piako River
- Length: 62 km (39 mi)

The Waitoa River is a major river of the Waikato Region of New Zealand's North Island. It flows initially northeast from its origins at Piarere (north of Lake Karapiro), before veering north through the Hinuera Gap and across the Hinuera Plains to pass to the west of Matamata, Walton and Waharoa before running through the settlement of Waitoa and reaching the southern edge of the Hauraki Plains. It converges with the Piako River in the Kopuatai Peat Dome wetland, approximately 15 kilometres north of Morrinsville.

The river largely follows the former course of the Waikato River, the course of which was drastically altered by the Oruanui eruption 25,000 years ago.

== See also ==
- List of rivers of New Zealand
