= NZMA =

NZMA is a four-letter acronym which can refer to:

- New Zealand Medical Association
- New Zealand Music Awards
- New Zealand Muslim Association
- NZMA, the ICAO airport code for Matamata Airport, Waikato, New Zealand
