= Edward Mark Best =

New Zealand police officer killed in the line of duty

- Born: 1899; Near Morrinsville, North Island
- Died: 11 October 1941 (aged 41–42); Westland Hospital, Hokitika, South Island
- Other name: Ted
- Relatives: Wife, 2 daughters
- Police career
- Country: New Zealand
- Department: New Zealand Police
- Service years: 20
- Rank: Constable
- Badge no.: 2364

Edward Mark Best (1899 – 11 October 1941) was a New Zealand police officer killed in the line of duty by farmer Stanley Graham.

== Early life and career ==
Best was born the son of a farmer in Annandale, near the North Island town of Morrinsville, New Zealand in 1899. He joined the New Zealand Police at age 21.

In the mid-1920s, he was transferred to the West Coast, on the South Island. In 1930, Best married a woman from the Arahura Valley, an area near his police house in Kaniere (less than 4 kilometres (2.5 mi) inland from the larger coastal settlement of Hokitika). The couple had two daughters together, who were aged nine and four at the time of his death.

Best's apparent ability to handle most community problems at a personal level made him a popular and effective policeman.

== Death ==
On 4 October 1941, Anker Madsen, a neighbour of local farmer Stanley Graham (who had previously been in disputes with the police), complained to Constable Best that Graham was accusing him of poisoning his cattle. The two farms were near Best's one-man police house in Kaniere, but he decided not to respond that day, in order to give Graham time to calm himself.

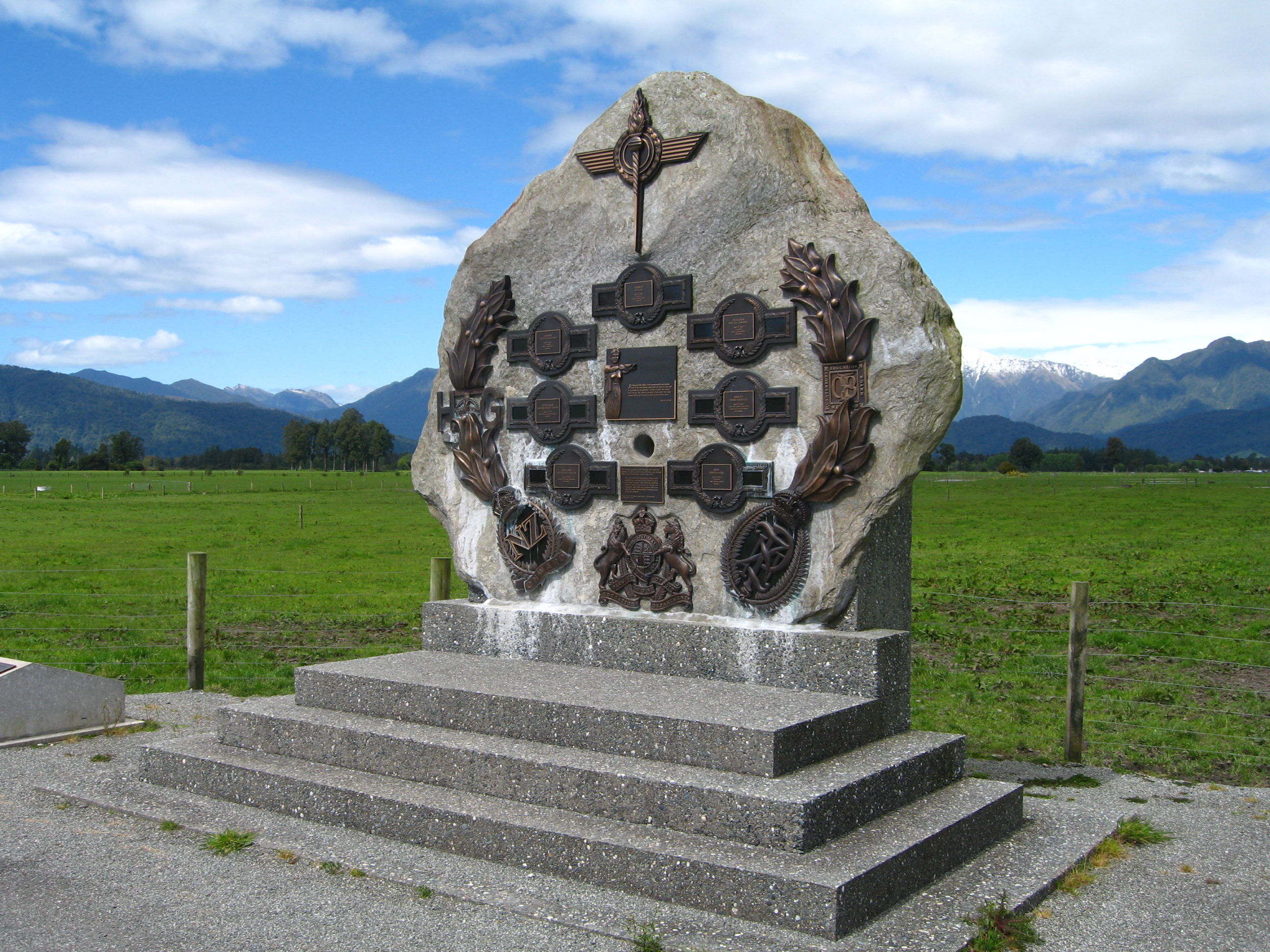
Memorial for the incident, Kowhitirangi

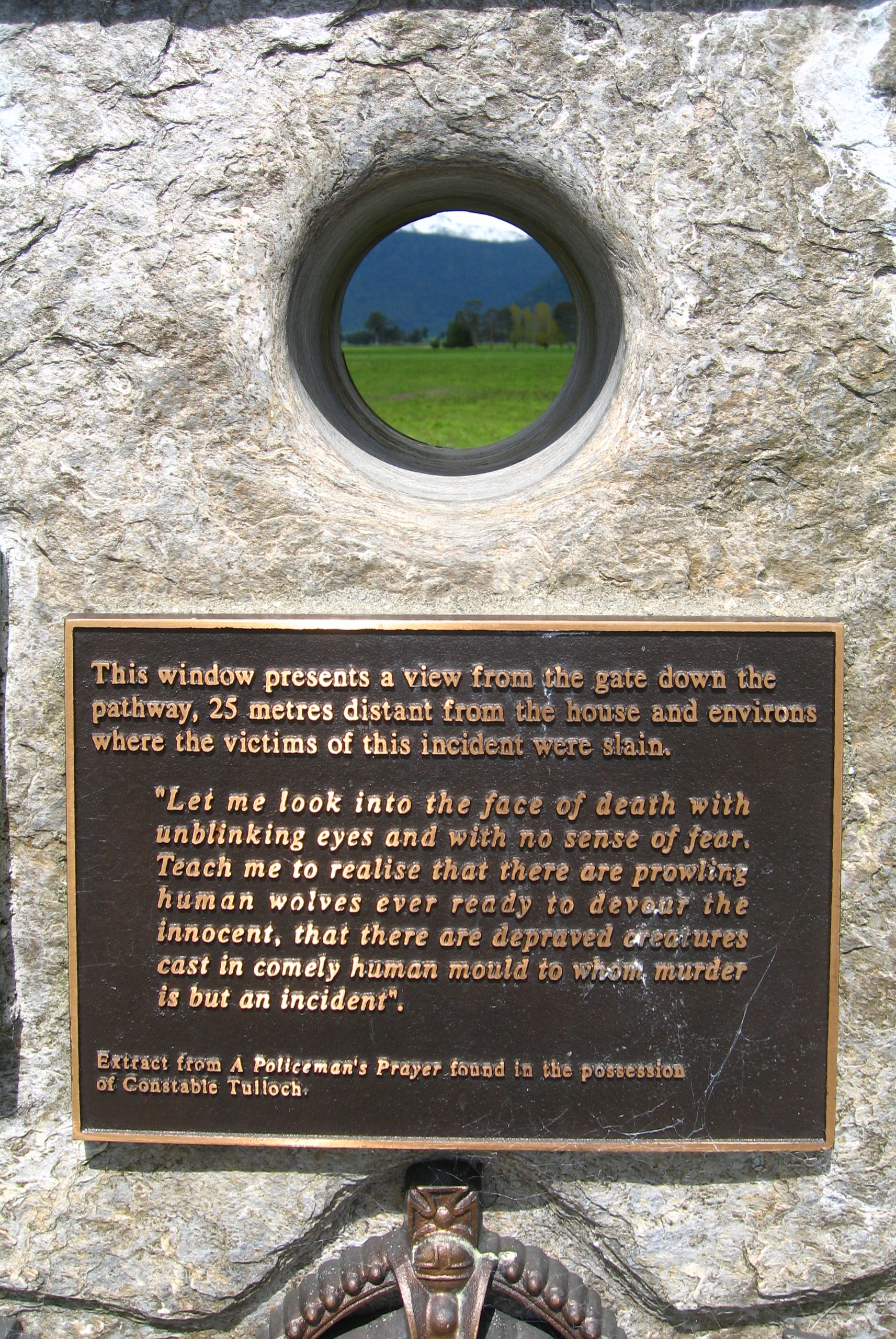
Detail of the memorial

On 8 October, Graham confronted Madsen with a rifle. Later that morning, Best attempted to discuss the matter with Graham but backed off with Graham pointing two rifles out the window at him. Best retreated to the larger "sergeant's station" in nearby Hokitika, then returned to the farm with Sergeant William Cooper, 43, and Constables Frederick Jordan, 26, and Percy Tulloch, 35.

After a short conversation inside his house, when Sergeant Cooper apparently reached to disarm Graham, Graham shot and wounded Cooper and Best. Graham then fired at Jordan and Tulloch as they ran into the house, killing them both instantly with the one bullet. When the badly wounded Cooper attempted to leave to obtain help, Graham shot him dead on the path in front of the house. Best was shot once more after allegedly attempting to plead with him, and died three days later. Graham also fatally wounded a field instructor for the Canterbury education board named George Ridley, who was drawn to Graham's property – along with an armed local – by the gunfire, looking to assist any wounded; Graham then threatened and disarmed the armed local. Graham then fled his house, but returned the next evening, when he killed wartime Home Guardsmen Richard "Maxie" Coulson and Gregory Hutchison in a firefight. Graham was wounded in the right shoulder during that engagement.

== Aftermath ==
The ensuing manhunt was the biggest in New Zealand history. It was overseen by the Commissioner of Police, Denis Cummings. More than 100 New Zealand Police from across the nation, with several hundred New Zealand Army and Home Guard personnel, searched the area for Graham for 12 days, with orders to shoot on sight if they found him still armed.

On 20 October, after being spotted by two police constables and a local civilian carrying his rifle and ammunition belts, an injured Graham was shot by Auckland Constable James D'Arcy Quirke (one of the two officers who spotted him) with a .303 rifle, from a distance of 25 m (27 yd), as Graham crawled through a patch of scrub. After being shot, he was surrounded by almost a hundred police and army, to one of whom he reportedly told that he "could have shot some more". He died the following morning at approximately 5:25 AM at Westland Hospital, Hokitika and was buried at Hokitika Cemetery. Constable Quirke reported Graham told him, after being shot, that he was intending to give up later that night.
