= Tahuna, Waikato =

Locality in Waikato, New Zealand

Tahuna
- Interactive map of Tahuna
- Coordinates: 37.501475°S 175.494258°E
- Country: New Zealand
- Region: Waikato
- District: Matamata-Piako District
- Ward: Morrinsville General Ward
- Electorates: Waikato; Hauraki-Waikato (Māori)

Government
  - Territorial Authority: Matamata-Piako District Council
  - Regional council: Waikato Regional Council
  - Mayor of Matamata-Piako: Ash Tanner
  - Waikato MP: Tim van de Molen
  - Hauraki-Waikato MP: Hana-Rawhiti Maipi-Clarke

Area
  - Total: 0.55 km^{2} (0.21 sq mi)

Population (June 2025)
  - Total: 140
  - Density: 250/km^{2} (660/sq mi)
- Time zone: UTC+12 (NZST)
  - Summer (DST): UTC+13 (NZDT)
- Postcode: 3373
- Area code: 07

Tahuna is a small rural settlement located 18 km north of Morrinsville. In the Māori language Tahuna means sandbank, likely to refer to the sandbanks along the nearby Piako River, where a Māori settlement started. Tahuna is seen as the upper limit for navigatable travel on the Piako River. The settlement has a rugby club, a lawn bowls club, a golf course and various shops.

Although Tahuna is in the Matamata-Piako District for local government, its representation in national government is within the Coromandel electorate due to the abolition of the Piako electorate for the 2008 election.

A town water supply was proposed in the 1980s and installed in the 2000s.

== History ==
Tahuna was opened for selection in 1902 and 1903.

== Marae ==
There are two marae in the Tahuna area:

- The Waiti-Raungaunu marae and Paoa meeting house are also associated with the Waikato Tainui hapū of Ngāti Makirangi, and with the iwi of Ngāti Paoa.
- Hoe o Tainui marae and surrounding settlement is affiliated with Ngāti Makirangi.

== Demographics ==
Stats NZ describes Tahuna as a rural settlement. It covers 0.55 km^{2} (0.21 sq mi) and had an estimated population of 140 as of June 2025, with a population density of 255 people per km^{2}. Tahuna is part of the larger Tahuna-Mangateparu statistical area.

Historical population for Tahuna settlement
Year	Pop.	±% p.a.
2013	144	—
2018	135	−1.28%
2023	135	+0.00%

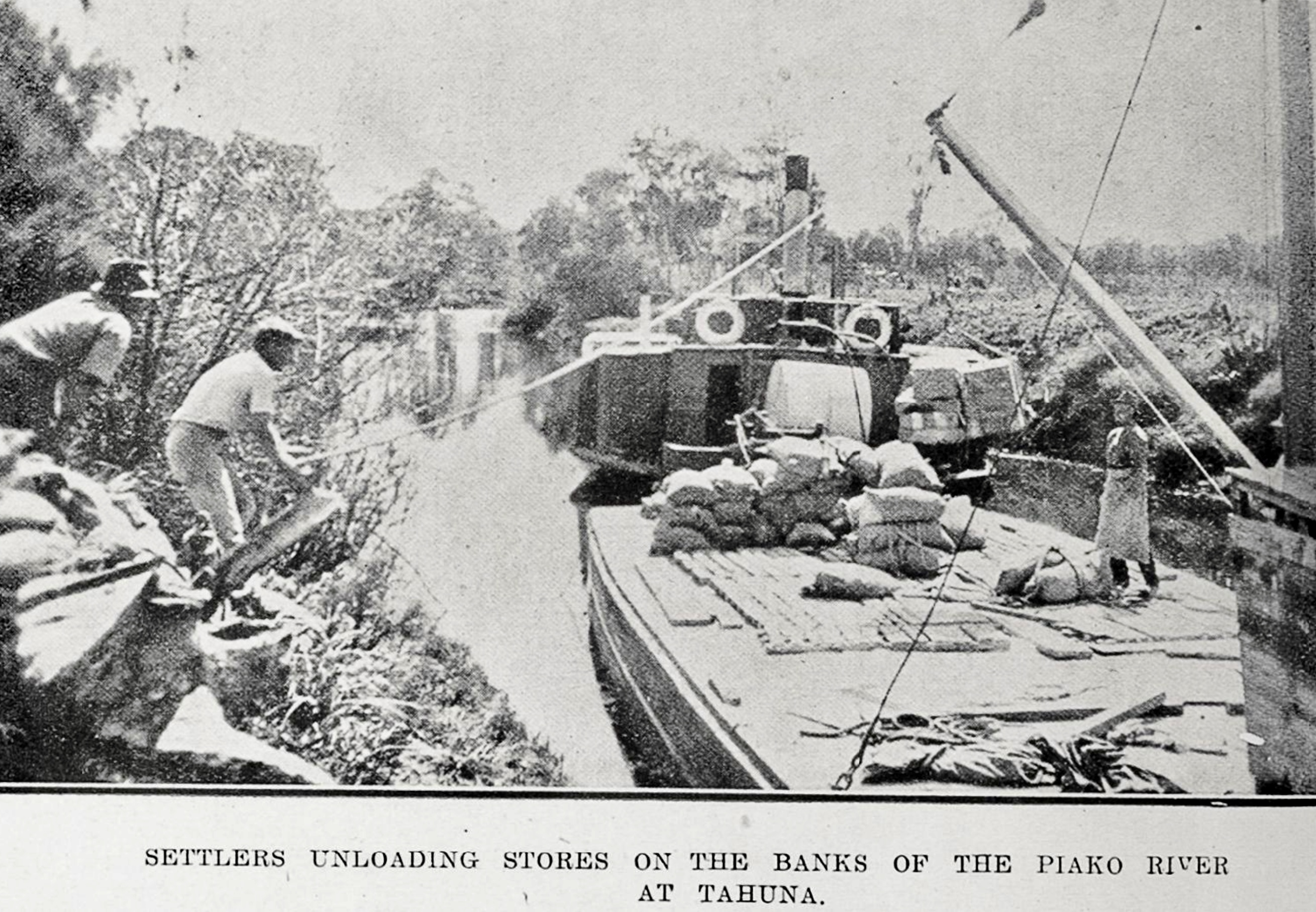
Kopu and barge unloading at Tahuna in 1922. Steamers continued for another 5 years

Tahuna had a population of 135 in the 2023 New Zealand census, unchanged since the 2018 census, and a decrease of 9 people (−6.2%) since the 2013 census. There were 60 males and 72 females in 45 dwellings. 2.2% of people identified as LGBTIQ+. The median age was 40.9 years (compared with 38.1 years nationally). There were 24 people (17.8%) aged under 15 years, 21 (15.6%) aged 15 to 29, 66 (48.9%) aged 30 to 64, and 24 (17.8%) aged 65 or older.

People could identify as more than one ethnicity. The results were 80.0% European (Pākehā), 17.8% Māori, 4.4% Pasifika, 11.1% Asian, and 8.9% other, which includes people giving their ethnicity as "New Zealander". English was spoken by 97.8%, Māori language by 4.4%, and other languages by 4.4%. The percentage of people born overseas was 11.1, compared with 28.8% nationally.

Religious affiliations were 20.0% Christian, 2.2% New Age, and 2.2% other religions. People who answered that they had no religion were 60.0%, and 13.3% of people did not answer the census question.

Of those at least 15 years old, 15 (13.5%) people had a bachelor's or higher degree, 57 (51.4%) had a post-high school certificate or diploma, and 39 (35.1%) people exclusively held high school qualifications. The median income was $41,800, compared with $41,500 nationally. 9 people (8.1%) earned over $100,000 compared to 12.1% nationally. The employment status of those at least 15 was that 60 (54.1%) people were employed full-time and 18 (16.2%) were part-time.

=== Tahuna-Mangateparu statistical area ===
Tahuna-Mangateparu statistical area, which includes Mangateparu, covers 238.92 km^{2} (92.25 sq mi) and had an estimated population of 1,760 as of June 2025, with a population density of 7.4 people per km^{2}.

Historical population for Tahuna-Mangateparu
Year	Pop.	±% p.a.
2006	1,419	—
2013	1,491	+0.71%
2018	1,569	+1.03%
2023	1,650	+1.01%

Tahuna-Mangateparu had a population of 1,650 in the 2023 New Zealand census, an increase of 81 people (5.2%) since the 2018 census, and an increase of 159 people (10.7%) since the 2013 census. There were 837 males, 807 females and 9 people of other genders in 579 dwellings. 2.0% of people identified as LGBTIQ+. The median age was 36.7 years (compared with 38.1 years nationally). There were 369 people (22.4%) aged under 15 years, 273 (16.5%) aged 15 to 29, 777 (47.1%) aged 30 to 64, and 231 (14.0%) aged 65 or older.

People could identify as more than one ethnicity. The results were 85.6% European (Pākehā); 14.5% Māori; 2.5% Pasifika; 6.7% Asian; 1.3% Middle Eastern, Latin American and African New Zealanders (MELAA); and 1.5% other, which includes people giving their ethnicity as "New Zealander". English was spoken by 96.9%, Māori language by 3.1%, Samoan by 0.4%, and other languages by 6.2%. No language could be spoken by 2.4% (e.g. too young to talk). New Zealand Sign Language was known by 0.2%. The percentage of people born overseas was 13.6, compared with 28.8% nationally.

Religious affiliations were 24.5% Christian, 1.1% Hindu, 0.2% Islam, 0.4% Māori religious beliefs, 0.4% New Age, 0.2% Jewish, and 2.5% other religions. People who answered that they had no religion were 60.7%, and 9.6% of people did not answer the census question.

Of those at least 15 years old, 198 (15.5%) people had a bachelor's or higher degree, 750 (58.5%) had a post-high school certificate or diploma, and 336 (26.2%) people exclusively held high school qualifications. The median income was $44,800, compared with $41,500 nationally. 135 people (10.5%) earned over $100,000 compared to 12.1% nationally. The employment status of those at least 15 was that 771 (60.2%) people were employed full-time, 201 (15.7%) were part-time, and 30 (2.3%) were unemployed.

== Education ==
Tahuna School is a co-educational state primary school for Year 1 to 6 students, with a roll of 74 as of July 2026. The school opened in 1905.
