= Waharoa, New Zealand =

Town in Waikato, New Zealand

Waharoa
- Interactive map of Waharoa
- Coordinates: 37°46′S 175°46′E
- Country: New Zealand
- Region: Waikato
- Territorial authority: Matamata-Piako District
- Ward: Matamata General Ward
- Electorates: Waikato; Hauraki-Waikato (Māori)

Government
  - Territorial Authority: Matamata-Piako District Council
  - Regional council: Waikato Regional Council
  - Mayor of Matamata-Piako: Ash Tanner
  - Waikato MP: Tim van de Molen
  - Hauraki-Waikato MP: Hana-Rawhiti Maipi-Clarke

Area
  - Total: 1.93 km^{2} (0.75 sq mi)

Population (June 2025)
  - Total: 710
  - Density: 370/km^{2} (950/sq mi)
- Time zone: UTC+12 (NZST)
  - Summer (DST): UTC+13 (NZDT)
- Postcode: 3401
- Area code: 07

Waharoa is a rural community in the Waikato region of New Zealand's North Island. It is located 7 km north of Matamata, and is part of the Matamata-Piako District. It is located at the junction of the Kinleith Branch railway and the East Coast Main Trunk Railway. State Highway 27 runs through the town, which is serviced by several shops and cafes and by a petrol station. Matamata Airport is just over 3 km (1.9 mi) north of Waharoa.

Also to the north, near the airport, are the community of Tamihana (where the Raungaiti marae is located) and remnants of the original Matamata pā. To the east lie the communities of Wardville and Turanga-o-moana, to the west the community of Walton, and to the south the town of Matamata.

== History ==
=== Early history ===
Prior to colonisation, the area surrounding and including present-day Waharoa was held by Ngāti Hauā. In 1830, the Ngāti Hauā chief Te Waharoa established the Matamata pā a few kilometres north of the current settlement.

Reverend Alfred Nesbit Brown first visited the area in 1833, and founded the nearby Matamata Mission Station in 1835. A year later, it was abandoned because of a war that broke out between Ngāti Hauā and neighbouring tribes. In 1841, a Catholic mission was established nearby, but by 1844 it had moved to Rangiaowhia.

In 1865, Josiah Firth began buying up land in the surrounding area from Te Waharoa's son, Wiremu Tamihana. Firth gradually converted the land to freehold sections. This area began to be called the Matamata estate. Today, a portion of that area is the settlement of Waharoa.

=== Establishment ===
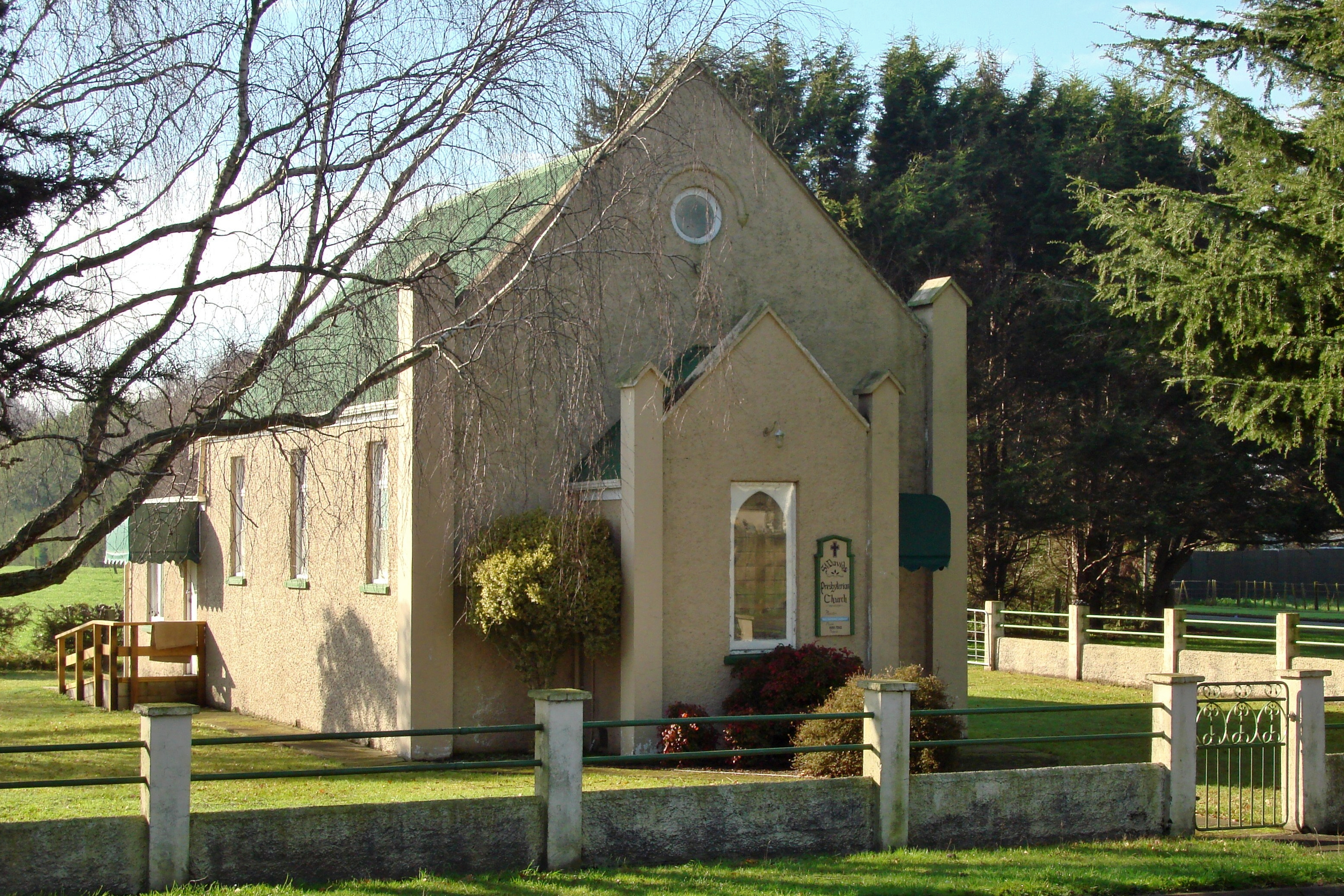
St Davids Church, Waharoa

Firth built the township of Waharoa in 1886 around what was then a new railway station, Waharoa Station. He established a church, a school, and a dairy factory and divided the land into ¼-acre sections.

In 1921, a butter factory was built in the town. Another local industry was flax production: The town by this time also had a flax mill. St Davids Presbyterian Church was dedicated on Sunday 18 October 1925. Meeting halls were built in 1916 and 1954.

=== Railway station ===
Waharoa had a flag station opposite Pitt St on the Kinleith Branch from 8 March 1886, opened from Morrinsville to Tīrau (then called Oxford) on Monday 8 March 1886 by the Thames Valley & Rotorua Railway Co. New Zealand Railways Department took over the line on 1 April 1886. In 1890 the daily train took about 2 hours to cover the 33 mi 38 ch (53.9 km) between Waharoa and Frankton (Hamilton). There was a 14 ft (4.3 m) by 8 ft (2.4 m) shelter shed, cattle yards and two cottages. Another state house was added in 1955. There was a Post Office at the station, run by ganger, from 1893 to 1900. By 1896 a platform, cart approach, loading bank, sheep yards and a passing loop for 33 wagons had been added. The loop had been extended to 40 by 1899 and 62 by 1964. By 1911 there was also a 40 ft (12 m) by 30 ft (9.1 m) shed. The station was rebuilt in 1923, had a verandah added in 1924 and closed to passengers on 12 November 1968 and to freight, other than private siding traffic, on 29 March 1981. There is now only a passing loop at the station site and a siding. There was a siding to the Waikato Co-op Dairy from 1925 until the Anchor dairy factory closed in 1995 and was demolished in 2005. Icepak still has a private siding.

	Former adjoining stations	
Walton; Line open, station closed 6 km (3.7 mi)	Kinleith Branch	Matamata; Line open, station closed 3.75 km (2.33 mi)

== Marae ==
The community of Waharoa is very close, with most people belonging to the Ngāti Hauā iwi.

The local Raungaiti Marae is affiliated with the Ngāti Hauā hapū of Ngāti Rangi Tawhaki and Ngāti Te Oro, and with the iwi of Waikato Tainui. It includes Te Oro meeting house.

In October 2020, the Government committed $734,311 from the Provincial Growth Fund to upgrade the marae and 4 other Ngāti Hauā marae, creating 7 jobs.

== Demographics ==
Statistics New Zealand describes Waharoa as a rural settlement, which covers 1.93 km^{2} (0.75 sq mi) and had an estimated population of 710 as of June 2025, with a population density of 368 people per km^{2}. Waharoa is part of the larger Waharoa-Peria statistical area.

Historical population of the settlement
Year	Pop.	±% p.a.
1886	3	—
1891	29	+57.42%
1896	131	+35.20%
1901	121	−1.58%
1906	188	+9.21%
1911	199	+1.14%
1916	258	+5.33%
1991	645	+1.23%
1996	558	−2.86%
2001	534	−0.88%
2006	519	−0.57%
2013	474	−1.29%
2018	639	+6.16%
2023	669	+0.92%
The 2006 population is for a smaller area of 1.23 km^{2}. Figures before 2006 are not for the same boundaries.

Waharoa had a population of 669 in the 2023 New Zealand census, an increase of 30 people (4.7%) since the 2018 census, and an increase of 195 people (41.1%) since the 2013 census. There were 339 males and 327 females in 168 dwellings. 2.2% of people identified as LGBTIQ+. The median age was 29.0 years (compared with 38.1 years nationally). There were 183 people (27.4%) aged under 15 years, 162 (24.2%) aged 15 to 29, 267 (39.9%) aged 30 to 64, and 54 (8.1%) aged 65 or older.

People could identify as more than one ethnicity. The results were 36.3% European (Pākehā); 68.2% Māori; 3.6% Pasifika; 5.8% Asian; 0.4% Middle Eastern, Latin American and African New Zealanders (MELAA); and 1.8% other, which includes people giving their ethnicity as "New Zealander". English was spoken by 94.2%, Māori language by 32.7%, and other languages by 4.5%. No language could be spoken by 2.7% (e.g. too young to talk). New Zealand Sign Language was known by 0.4%. The percentage of people born overseas was 7.2, compared with 28.8% nationally.

Religious affiliations were 32.3% Christian, 1.8% Hindu, 0.9% Islam, 3.6% Māori religious beliefs, 0.4% Buddhist, 0.9% New Age, and 0.4% other religions. People who answered that they had no religion were 52.5%, and 7.6% of people did not answer the census question.

Of those at least 15 years old, 48 (9.9%) people had a bachelor's or higher degree, 240 (49.4%) had a post-high school certificate or diploma, and 198 (40.7%) people exclusively held high school qualifications. The median income was $33,700, compared with $41,500 nationally. 12 people (2.5%) earned over $100,000 compared to 12.1% nationally. The employment status of those at least 15 was that 231 (47.5%) people were employed full-time, 75 (15.4%) were part-time, and 33 (6.8%) were unemployed.

=== Waharoa-Peria statistical area ===
Waharoa-Peria statistical area covers 72.10 km^{2} (27.84 sq mi) and had an estimated population of 1,460 as of June 2025, with a population density of 20 people per km^{2}.

Historical population for Waharoa-Peria
Year	Pop.	±% p.a.
2006	1,314	—
2013	1,098	−2.53%
2018	1,302	+3.47%
2023	1,359	+0.86%
The 2006 population is for a larger area of 74.20 km^{2}. Source:

Waharoa-Peria had a population of 1,359 in the 2023 New Zealand census, an increase of 57 people (4.4%) since the 2018 census, and an increase of 261 people (23.8%) since the 2013 census. There were 672 males, 687 females and 3 people of other genders in 420 dwellings. 2.4% of people identified as LGBTIQ+. The median age was 34.1 years (compared with 38.1 years nationally). There were 315 people (23.2%) aged under 15 years, 282 (20.8%) aged 15 to 29, 594 (43.7%) aged 30 to 64, and 165 (12.1%) aged 65 or older.

People could identify as more than one ethnicity. The results were 64.9% European (Pākehā); 38.6% Māori; 2.2% Pasifika; 6.0% Asian; 0.4% Middle Eastern, Latin American and African New Zealanders (MELAA); and 0.9% other, which includes people giving their ethnicity as "New Zealander". English was spoken by 96.0%, Māori language by 16.8%, and other languages by 4.6%. No language could be spoken by 2.4% (e.g. too young to talk). New Zealand Sign Language was known by 0.4%. The percentage of people born overseas was 11.0, compared with 28.8% nationally.

Religious affiliations were 33.1% Christian, 0.9% Hindu, 0.4% Islam, 1.8% Māori religious beliefs, 0.4% Buddhist, 0.7% New Age, 0.2% Jewish, and 0.4% other religions. People who answered that they had no religion were 53.2%, and 8.8% of people did not answer the census question.

Of those at least 15 years old, 141 (13.5%) people had a bachelor's or higher degree, 558 (53.4%) had a post-high school certificate or diploma, and 342 (32.8%) people exclusively held high school qualifications. The median income was $40,900, compared with $41,500 nationally. 90 people (8.6%) earned over $100,000 compared to 12.1% nationally. The employment status of those at least 15 was that 546 (52.3%) people were employed full-time, 171 (16.4%) were part-time, and 45 (4.3%) were unemployed.

== Education ==
Te Kura o Waharoa is the township's state primary school, teaching Year 1 to 6 students in the Māori language. It opened in 1887, with the current buildings dating from 1949, 1957, 1965 and 1967. It has a roll of 41 as of July 2026.

Wairere School is a co-educational state primary school located in the Wardville area north-west of Waharoa. with a roll of 38 as of July 2026.

== See also ==
- List of towns in New Zealand
