= Rukumoana Marae =

Marae in New Zealand

Coordinates: 37.69908°S 175.55680°E

The Rukumoana Marae is a marae located between the towns of Morrinsville and Kiwitahi. It was built between 1915 and 1917 and used as a parliament house during the Māori King Movement.
