= Elstow, New Zealand =

Locality in Matamata-Piako District, New Zealand

Coordinates: 37°31′28″S 175°38′17″E

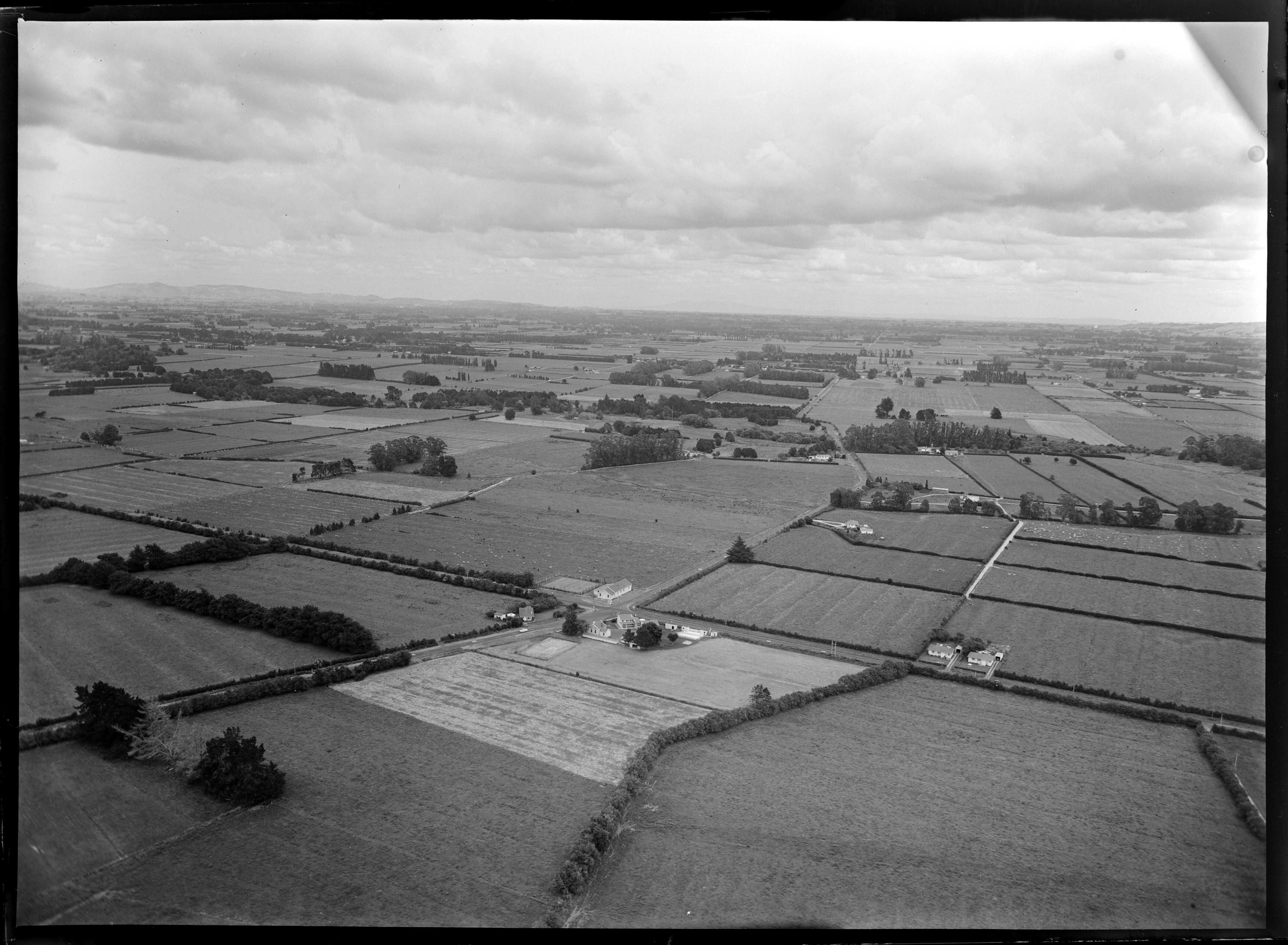
Aerial view of Elstow

Elstow is a locality in New Zealand.

== Etymology ==
Elstow is named after the village of Elstow, Bedfordshire, England. Originally named Aylesbury, two brothers, Edward and Allen Bowler, named it after their hometown in England.

== History ==
The English Bowler brothers purchased land from Frederick Strange in 1878, they named the area after their English hometown and planted oaks, chestnuts, and elms to make the area feel more like England. During the Second World War Elstow sent food parcels to her namesake village in England.

== Education ==
Elstow School was established in 1891. For the school's diamond jubilee a war memorial gate was erected. The gates list the names of 31 local servicemen, with 3 killed in action, during the First World War; and 33 local servicemen, with 3 killed in action, during the Second World War.

== Notable residents ==
John Mellon was an English pioneer who lived in a small hut by the Waitoa River. He cultivated an apple orchard in Elstow and cleared the bush in the area, he sold off the land he cleared and moved back to England. Mellon Road is named after him.
