= Morrinsville =

New Zealand town

- Town
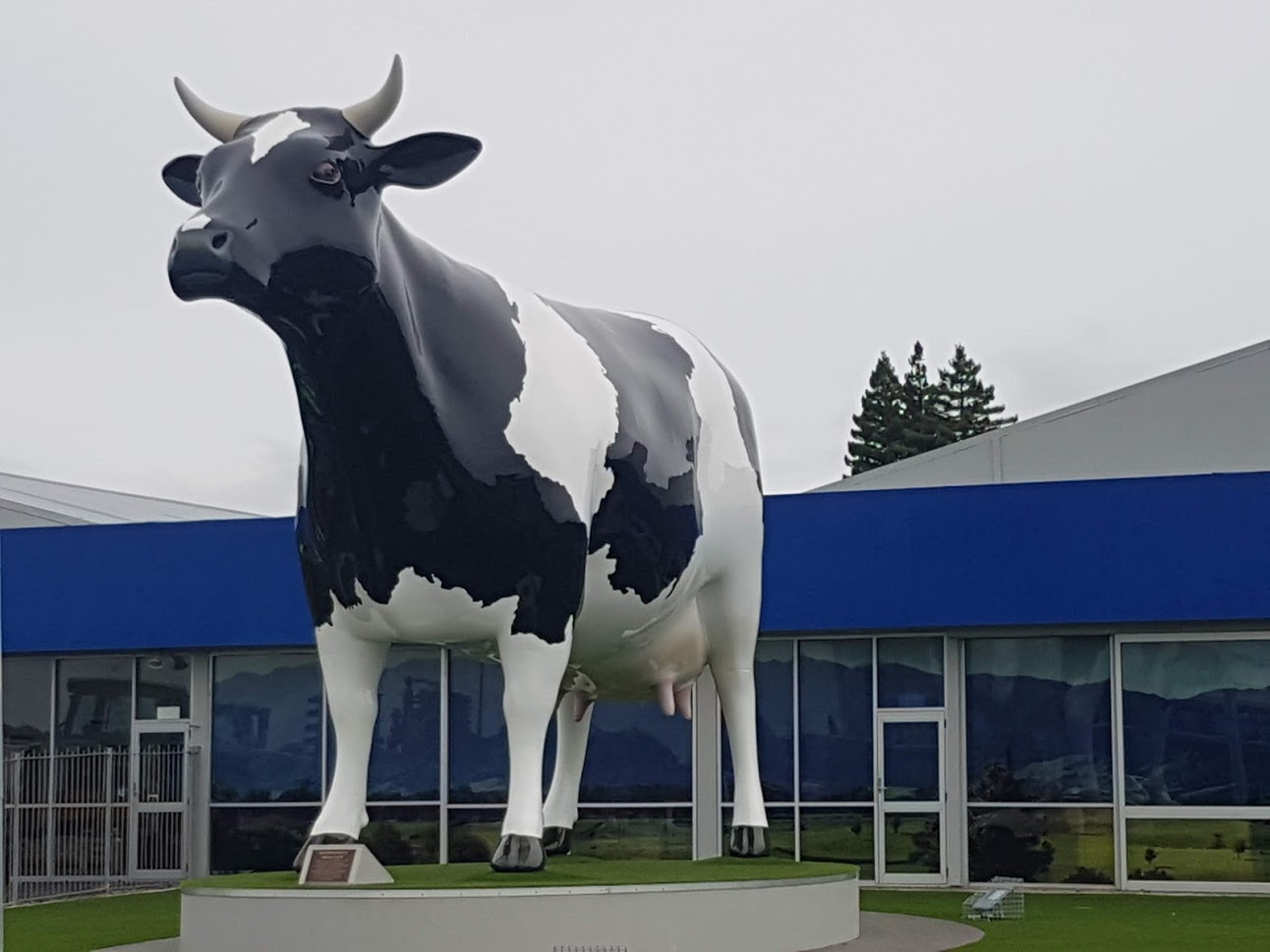
- "Mabel," the Morrinsville Mega Cow
- Interactive map of Morrinsville
- Coordinates: 37°39′S 175°31′E
- Country: New Zealand
- Region: Waikato
- Territorial authority: Matamata-Piako District
- Ward: Morrinsville General
- Electorates: Waikato; Hauraki-Waikato (Māori)

Government
  - Territorial Authority: Matamata-Piako District Council
  - Regional council: Waikato Regional Council
  - Mayor of Matamata-Piako: Ash Tanner
  - Waikato MP: Tim van de Molen
  - Hauraki-Waikato MP: Hana-Rawhiti Maipi-Clarke

Area
  - Total: 10.28 km^{2} (3.97 sq mi)

Population (June 2025)
  - Total: 9,770
  - Density: 950/km^{2} (2,460/sq mi)
- Time zone: UTC+12 (NZST)
  - Summer (DST): UTC+13 (NZDT)
- Postcode: 3300
- Area code: 07

Morrinsville (Māori: Mōrena) is a provincial town in the Waikato region of New Zealand's North Island. Morrinsville is a service town for the local dairy industry; the area surrounding the town has the highest concentration of dairy cattle in New Zealand.

== History ==
=== Pre-European settlement ===
Prior to European settlement of New Zealand, the hills around present-day Morrinsville were occupied by the Ngati Werewere Māori people of the Ngati Haua Iwi, and the site of the present-day town was on or near to an old Māori route between the upper Waihou-Piako basin and the Ngāruawāhia area.

Following the arrival of Europeans, some early European traders are believed to have traversed this route prior to 1834 when the Rev. J. Morgan travelled up the Piako River to near the future town site and crossed west to Horotiu, near Ngāruawāhia. First recorded contact with European settlers in the area occurred around 1850, with John Johnson trading with the Māori from 1852.

=== Post-European settlement ===
The 1860s saw an influx of European settlers to the area between Te Aroha and Matamata, and on 13 December 1873 a settler from Auckland, Thomas Morrin, purchased the Kuranui No.1 Block from the local Māori and founded the Lockerbie Estate, which Morrin named after the Scottish town from which his father had emigrated. In May 1874, Morrin purchased two further blocks, Motumaoho No.1 and No.2, and his estate then totalled over 30,000 acres (12,000 hectares). The fledgling village was to be the service centre for Morrin's Lockerbie Estate and he built a blacksmith's shop, manager's house, the Jolly Cripple Hotel and general store and donated land for a school. Morrin hired Irish navvies from the gold fields to dig a network of ditches to drain the land, enabling it to be used for agriculture. In 1882 Morrin surveyed the land for the site of the town proper, and deposited plans for ten streets: Anderson, Hamilton, Studholme, Moorhouse, Lorne, Canada, Cureton, Somerville, Thames and Thorpe (the first and last three streets being named after family members).

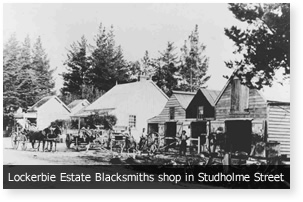
Lockerbie Estate Blacksmiths in Studholme Street, Morrinsville, circa 1890

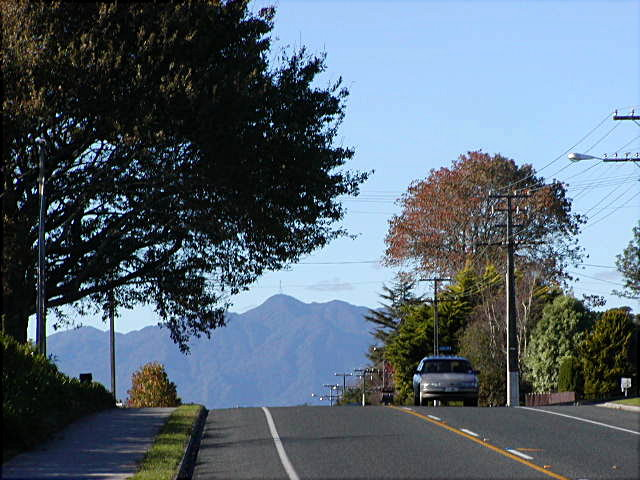
Main Road into Morrinsville - Mt Te Aroha in the background

The Thames Valley and Rotorua Railway Company began construction of a railway line from Morrinsville to Rotorua in 1879, and on 1 October 1884, the line from Hamilton to Morrinsville was opened. With construction progressing towards Paeroa and the line to Te Aroha opening on 1 March 1886, the town's population was listed as 633 people. There were some proposals for lines to Matamata, Tīrau, and Rotorua, which would have turned Morrinsville into an area where several lines meet, instead a railway line was built to Lichfield. In 1880 Morrinsville was a hamlet with her own school, post office, and hotel. With further expansion of the railway towards Thames and Tauranga, alongside extensive drainage of swamp land to the south and west of the town making available large areas for dairy farming. Morrinsville was declared a town district in 1908 and in 1921 was constituted as a borough.

In 1895 the first church in Morrinsville, an Anglican church, was constructed. In 1907 a police station was constructed. The resident constable also serviced Wardville, Gordon, and Waharoa.

In 1957 Morrinsville annexed land from Piako County. The expansion included land at the south-east up to the Piako River and the Waitakaruru Stream, alongside land near the Tahuna-Waharoa highway, and land around Avenue Road.

In the early 1900s a Māori canoe (waka) was discovered on a property in Tahuna. The 45 ft (14 m) waka, named Maungateroto, had been laying on the property under a tree for 60 years. The waka was placed outside the Morrinsville War Memorial Hall after being gifted to Morrinsville by Ngati-Paoa in 1968.

== Demographics ==
In 1881 Morrinsville had a population of 115, and 30 years later it was 300. When Morrinsville was constituted as a town district in 1911 it had a population of 565. By 1971 it was 4,454.

Morrinsville covers 10.28 km^{2} (3.97 sq mi) and had an estimated population of 9,770 as of June 2025, with a population density of 950 people per km^{2}.

Historical population
Year	Pop.	±% p.a.
2006	6,603	—
2013	7,047	+0.93%
2018	7,893	+2.29%
2023	9,003	+2.67%
The 2006 population is for a smaller area of 7.78 km^{2}. Source:

Morrinsville had a population of 9,003 in the 2023 New Zealand census, an increase of 1,110 people (14.1%) since the 2018 census, and an increase of 1,956 people (27.8%) since the 2013 census. There were 4,293 males, 4,695 females and 18 people of other genders in 3,390 dwellings. 2.2% of people identified as LGBTIQ+. The median age was 38.5 years (compared with 38.1 years nationally). There were 1,860 people (20.7%) aged under 15 years, 1,617 (18.0%) aged 15 to 29, 3,627 (40.3%) aged 30 to 64, and 1,896 (21.1%) aged 65 or older.

People could identify as more than one ethnicity. The results were 83.1% European (Pākehā); 19.5% Māori; 2.3% Pasifika; 7.6% Asian; 0.9% Middle Eastern, Latin American and African New Zealanders (MELAA); and 2.0% other, which includes people giving their ethnicity as "New Zealander". English was spoken by 96.0%, Māori language by 4.2%, Samoan by 0.2%, and other languages by 8.0%. No language could be spoken by 2.7% (e.g. too young to talk). New Zealand Sign Language was known by 0.5%. The percentage of people born overseas was 14.5, compared with 28.8% nationally.

Religious affiliations were 30.2% Christian, 0.8% Hindu, 0.4% Islam, 1.0% Māori religious beliefs, 1.5% Buddhist, 0.4% New Age, and 2.1% other religions. People who answered that they had no religion were 56.1%, and 7.6% of people did not answer the census question.

Of those at least 15 years old, 1,158 (16.2%) people had a bachelor's or higher degree, 3,978 (55.7%) had a post-high school certificate or diploma, and 2,010 (28.1%) people exclusively held high school qualifications. The median income was $41,200, compared with $41,500 nationally. 645 people (9.0%) earned over $100,000 compared to 12.1% nationally. The employment status of those at least 15 was that 3,648 (51.1%) people were employed full-time, 870 (12.2%) were part-time, and 171 (2.4%) were unemployed.

Individual statistical areas
Name	Area (km^{2})	Population	Density (per km^{2})	Dwellings	Median age	Median income
Morrinsville North	1.85	1,593	861	597	37.9 years	$44,200
Morrinsville East	3.24	4,143	1,280	1,581	41.8 years	$40,900
Morrinsville West	5.19	3,267	629	1,212	35.3 years	$40,300
New Zealand					38.1 years	$41,500

Apart from Morrinsville, the largest number of commuters go to Waihou from Morrinsville East and Tahuroa from West. In 2018 13.8% of the population of Morrinsville East and 25.1% of West were Māori.

== Education ==
Morrinsville College is the town's state secondary school, with a roll of 758. It opened in 1923 on a trial basis as Matamata District High School and moved to a new site in 1939. It became Morrinsville College in 1950.

Morrinsville Intermediate is the state intermediate school, with a roll of 361. It opened in 1970.

The town has two state primary schools for Year 1 to 6 students: Morrinsville School, with a roll of 222; and David Street School, with a roll of 509; Morrinsville School opened in 1877 at Studholme St, and moved in stages to Lincoln Street between 1920 and 1935 as the high school expanded on the original site. David Street School opened in 1955.

A third primary school, Motumaoho School, is located south-west of the town on State Highway 26; it has a roll of 28.

St Joseph's Catholic School is a state integrated Catholic primary school, with a roll of 185. It opened in 1930.

All these schools are co-educational. Rolls are as of July 2026.

== Economy ==
Morrinsville's economic growth is dependent on the surrounding countryside: the Piako country is one of the wealthiest farming areas in the world with the country being good for dairy cattle specifically.

Morrinsville was impacted by the Long Depression but weathered it better than other settlements due to its location on the railway line.

Morrinsville houses several factories involved in agricultural products such as a butter factory, which claims to be the first butter factory in the world to be fully automated, and a fertiliser factory.

== Transportation ==
=== Railway ===
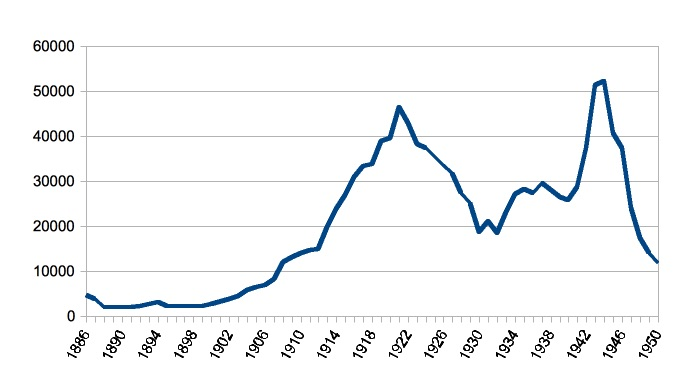
Ticket sales 1885–1950 (derived from annual returns to Parliament of "Statement of Revenue for each Station for the Year ended")

Historically, Morrinsville was the railway junction of the Auckland–Thames and Auckland–Rotorua lines, which subsequently became the Thames Branch and the East Coast Main Trunk Railway (Tauranga) lines. Morrinsville Railway Station was opened on 1 October 1884, to the east off Studholme Street, at the junction of the two lines. A footbridge over the track was opened in 1913, connecting the station with the town from the end of Canada Street. The station was described as consisting of "two asphalt passenger platforms, and the station buildings contain a ladies' waiting room, a large general waiting room, a post office lobby with post and telegraph offices, a ticket office, and offices for the Inspector of Permanent Way. There are also large goods and engine sheds, and cattle loading yards. Five workmen's cottages adjoin the station, and the Bank of New Zealand Estates Company has a large building connected with the siding for seed-cleaning and storage purposes." The station was moved about 1/4 mile (0.40 km) towards Hamilton in 1923. The original station building was demolished in 1984 and a smaller building was erected approximately 300 metres to the west off Marshall Street, which is still used by KiwiRail for freight services.

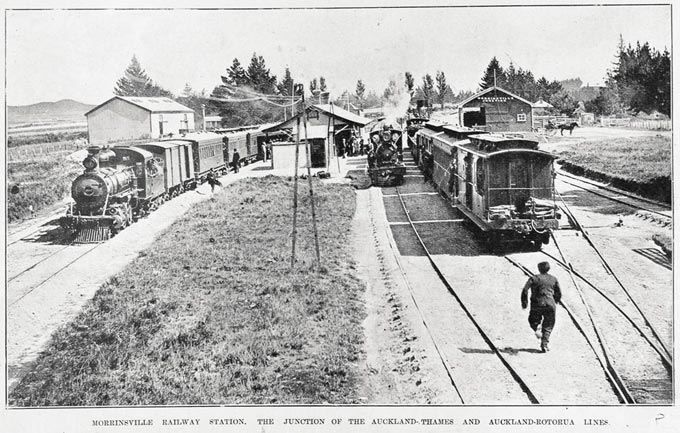
Morrinsville railway station, 1902

Passenger trains no longer stop at Morrinsville Railway Station. The Thames Branch closed on 28 June 1991 and the track subsequently lifted, although in 2004 a short shunt line – the Waitoa Industrial Line – reopened to facilitate freight trains for the Waitoa Dairy Factory. The East Coast Main Trunk Railway provided passenger services between Auckland and Rotorua – the Geyserland Express – and Auckland and Tauranga - the Kaimai Express; however, in 2001 it was announced that these services were too uneconomic to continue, and the last trains ran on 7 October 2001.

Passenger traffic reached a peak in 1944, as shown in this table and the graph:

year	tickets	season tickets	staff	source	titte
1885	1,652	3	3	https://paperspast.natlib.govt.nz/parliamentary/appendix-to-the-journals-of-the-house-of-representatives/1885/I/1156	RETURN No. 10. STATEMENT of Revenue and Expenditure of each Station for the Twelve Months ending 31 March 1885
1886	4,562	6	6	https://paperspast.natlib.govt.nz/parliamentary/appendix-to-the-journals-of-the-house-of-representatives/1886/I/1138	RETURN No. 10. STATEMENT of Revenue and Expenditure of each Station for the Twelve Months ending 31 March 1886
1887	3,688	63	2	https://paperspast.natlib.govt.nz/parliamentary/appendix-to-the-journals-of-the-house-of-representatives/1887/I/920	RETURN No. 10. STATEMENT of Revenue and Expenditure of each Station for the Twelve Months ending 31 March 1887
1888	1,892	58	1	https://paperspast.natlib.govt.nz/parliamentary/appendix-to-the-journals-of-the-house-of-representatives/1889/I/1068?large_image=true	RETURN No. 10. STATEMENT of Revenue and Expenditure of each Station for the Twelve Months ending 31 March 1888
1889	1,911	26	1	https://paperspast.natlib.govt.nz/parliamentary/appendix-to-the-journals-of-the-house-of-representatives/1889/I/1068	RETURN No. 10. STATEMENT of Revenue and Expenditure of each Station for the Twelve Months ending 31 March 1889
1890				https://paperspast.natlib.govt.nz/parliamentary/appendix-to-the-journals-of-the-house-of-representatives/1890/I/1064	RETURN No. 10. STATEMENT of Revenue and Expenditure of each Station for the Twelve Months ending 31 March 1890
1891	2,024	7	2	https://paperspast.natlib.govt.nz/parliamentary/appendix-to-the-journals-of-the-house-of-representatives/1891/II/1264	RETURN No. 10. STATEMENT of Revenue and Expenditure of each Station for the Twelve Months ending 31 March 1891
1892	2,175	13	2	https://paperspast.natlib.govt.nz/parliamentary/appendix-to-the-journals-of-the-house-of-representatives/1892/I/1164	RETURN No. 10. STATEMENT of Revenue and Expenditure of each Station for the Twelve Months ending 31 March 1892
1893	2,603	26	2	https://paperspast.natlib.govt.nz/parliamentary/appendix-to-the-journals-of-the-house-of-representatives/1893/I/1494	RETURN No. 10. STATEMENT of Revenue and Expenditure of each Station for the Twelve Months ending 31 March 1893
1894	2,965	16	3	https://paperspast.natlib.govt.nz/parliamentary/appendix-to-the-journals-of-the-house-of-representatives/1894/I/1388	RETURN No. 10. STATEMENT of Revenue and Expenditure of each Station for the Twelve Months ending 31 March 1894
1895	2,137	15	3	https://paperspast.natlib.govt.nz/parliamentary/appendix-to-the-journals-of-the-house-of-representatives/1895/I/1586	RETURN No. 10. STATEMENT of Revenue and Expenditure of each Station for the Twelve Months ending 31 March 1895
1896	2,241	8	3	https://paperspast.natlib.govt.nz/parliamentary/appendix-to-the-journals-of-the-house-of-representatives/1896/I/1624	RETURN No. 10. STATEMENT of Revenue and Expenditure of each Station for the Twelve Months ending 31 March 1896
1897	2,225	8	3	https://paperspast.natlib.govt.nz/parliamentary/appendix-to-the-journals-of-the-house-of-representatives/1897/II/1610	RETURN No. 12. STATEMENT of Revenue and Expenditure of each Station for the Year ended 31 March 1897
1898	2,249	11	3	https://paperspast.natlib.govt.nz/parliamentary/appendix-to-the-journals-of-the-house-of-representatives/1898/I/1670	RETURN No. 12. STATEMENT of Revenue and Expenditure of each Station for the Year ended 31 March 1898
1899	2,172	29	3	https://paperspast.natlib.govt.nz/parliamentary/appendix-to-the-journals-of-the-house-of-representatives/1899/I/1824	RETURN No. 12. STATEMENT of Revenue and Expenditure of each Station for the Year ended 31 March 1899
1900	2,621	22	4	https://paperspast.natlib.govt.nz/parliamentary/appendix-to-the-journals-of-the-house-of-representatives/1900/I/1612	RETURN No. 12. STATEMENT of Revenue and Expenditure of each Station for the Year ended 31 March 1900
1901					RETURN No. 12. STATEMENT of Revenue and Expenditure of each Station for the Year ended 31 March 1901
1902	3,787	2	4	https://paperspast.natlib.govt.nz/parliamentary/appendix-to-the-journals-of-the-house-of-representatives/1902/I/1436	RETURN No. 12. STATEMENT of Revenue and Expenditure of each Station for the Year ended 31 March 1902
1903	4,448	16	5	https://paperspast.natlib.govt.nz/parliamentary/appendix-to-the-journals-of-the-house-of-representatives/1903/I/1873	RETURN No. 12. STATEMENT of Revenue and Expenditure of each Station for the Year ended 31 March 1903
1904	5,652	34	5	https://paperspast.natlib.govt.nz/parliamentary/appendix-to-the-journals-of-the-house-of-representatives/1904/I/1848	RETURN No. 12. STATEMENT of Revenue and Expenditure of each Station for the Year ended 31 March 1904
1905	6,363	22	5	https://paperspast.natlib.govt.nz/parliamentary/appendix-to-the-journals-of-the-house-of-representatives/1905/I/3767	RETURN No. 12. STATEMENT of Revenue and Expenditure of each Station for the Year ended 31 March 1905
1906	6,747	17	5	https://paperspast.natlib.govt.nz/parliamentary/appendix-to-the-journals-of-the-house-of-representatives/1906/II/1600	RETURN No. 12. STATEMENT of Revenue and Expenditure of each Station for the Year ended 31 March 1906
1907	8,099	26	6	https://paperspast.natlib.govt.nz/parliamentary/appendix-to-the-journals-of-the-house-of-representatives/1907/I/2542	RETURN No. 12. STATEMENT of Revenue and Expenditure of each Station for the Year ended 31 March 1907
1908	11,985	43	7	https://paperspast.natlib.govt.nz/parliamentary/appendix-to-the-journals-of-the-house-of-representatives/1908/I/2061	RETURN No. 12. STATEMENT of Revenue and Expenditure of each Station for the Year ended 31 March 1908
1909	13,067	43	8	https://paperspast.natlib.govt.nz/parliamentary/appendix-to-the-journals-of-the-house-of-representatives/1909/II/1832	RETURN No. 12. STATEMENT of Revenue and Expenditure of each Station for the Year ended 31 March 1909
1910	14,043	44	6	https://paperspast.natlib.govt.nz/parliamentary/appendix-to-the-journals-of-the-house-of-representatives/1910/I/2050	RETURN No. 12. STATEMENT of Revenue and Expenditure of each Station for the Year ended 31 March 1910
1911	14,505	57	5	https://paperspast.natlib.govt.nz/parliamentary/appendix-to-the-journals-of-the-house-of-representatives/1911/I/2497	RETURN No. 12. STATEMENT of Revenue and Expenditure of each Station for the Year ended 31 March 1911
1912	14,718	69	6	https://paperspast.natlib.govt.nz/parliamentary/appendix-to-the-journals-of-the-house-of-representatives/1912/II/2420	RETURN No. 12. STATEMENT of Revenue and Expenditure of each Station for the Year ended 31 March 1912
1913	19,603	62	8	https://paperspast.natlib.govt.nz/parliamentary/appendix-to-the-journals-of-the-house-of-representatives/1913/I/3693	RETURN No. 12. STATEMENT of Revenue and Expenditure of each Station for the Year ended 31 March 1913
1914	23,661	74		https://paperspast.natlib.govt.nz/parliamentary/appendix-to-the-journals-of-the-house-of-representatives/1914/I/2031	RETURN No. 12. Statement of Revenue for each Station for the Year ended 31 March 1914
1915	26,790	120		https://paperspast.natlib.govt.nz/parliamentary/appendix-to-the-journals-of-the-house-of-representatives/1915/I/1638	RETURN No. 12. Statement of Revenue for each Station for the Year ended 31 March 1915
1916	30,754	358		https://paperspast.natlib.govt.nz/parliamentary/appendix-to-the-journals-of-the-house-of-representatives/1916/I/1053	RETURN No. 12. Statement of Revenue for each Station for the Year ended 31 March 1916
1917	33,249	264		https://paperspast.natlib.govt.nz/parliamentary/appendix-to-the-journals-of-the-house-of-representatives/1917/I/1123	RETURN No. 12. Statement of Revenue for each Station for the Year ended 31 March 1917
1918	33,602	320		https://paperspast.natlib.govt.nz/parliamentary/appendix-to-the-journals-of-the-house-of-representatives/1918/I-II/1159	RETURN No. 12. Statement of Revenue for each Station for the Year ended 31 March 1918
1919	38,808	351		https://paperspast.natlib.govt.nz/parliamentary/appendix-to-the-journals-of-the-house-of-representatives/1919/I/1231	RETURN No. 12. Statement of Revenue for each Station for the Year ended 31 March 1919
1920	39,360	249		https://paperspast.natlib.govt.nz/parliamentary/appendix-to-the-journals-of-the-house-of-representatives/1920/I/1349	RETURN No. 12. Statement of Revenue for each Station for the Year ended 31 March 1920
1921	46,421	309		https://paperspast.natlib.govt.nz/parliamentary/appendix-to-the-journals-of-the-house-of-representatives/1921/I-II/1452	RETURN No. 12. Statement of Revenue for each Station for the Year ended 31 March 1921
1922	42,904	424		https://paperspast.natlib.govt.nz/parliamentary/appendix-to-the-journals-of-the-house-of-representatives/1922/I/1409	RETURN No. 12. Statement of Revenue for each Station for the Year ended 31 March 1922
1923	38,073	478		https://paperspast.natlib.govt.nz/parliamentary/appendix-to-the-journals-of-the-house-of-representatives/1923/I-II/1321	RETURN No. 12. Statement of Revenue for each Station for the Year ended 31 March 1923
1924	37,166	593		https://paperspast.natlib.govt.nz/parliamentary/appendix-to-the-journals-of-the-house-of-representatives/1924/I/2458	RETURN No. 12. Statement of Revenue for each Station for the Year ended 31 March 1924
1925	35,327	354		https://paperspast.natlib.govt.nz/parliamentary/appendix-to-the-journals-of-the-house-of-representatives/1925/I/1804	RETURN No. 12. Statement of Traffic and Revenue for each Station for the Year ended 31 March 1925
1926	33,467	446		https://paperspast.natlib.govt.nz/parliamentary/appendix-to-the-journals-of-the-house-of-representatives/1926/I/1930	STATEMENT No. 18 Statement of Traffic and Revenue for each Station for the Year ended 31 March 1926
1927	31,587	261		https://paperspast.natlib.govt.nz/parliamentary/appendix-to-the-journals-of-the-house-of-representatives/1927/I/2230	STATEMENT No. 18 Statement of Traffic and Revenue for each Station for the Year ended 31 March 1927
1928	27,278	286		https://paperspast.natlib.govt.nz/parliamentary/appendix-to-the-journals-of-the-house-of-representatives/1928/I/2628	STATEMENT No. 18 Statement of Traffic and Revenue for each Station for the Year ended 31 March 1928
1929	24,925	215		https://paperspast.natlib.govt.nz/parliamentary/appendix-to-the-journals-of-the-house-of-representatives/1929/I/2090	STATEMENT No. 18 Statement of Traffic and Revenue for each Station for the Year ended 31 March 1929
1930	18,686	257		https://paperspast.natlib.govt.nz/parliamentary/appendix-to-the-journals-of-the-house-of-representatives/1930/I/2212	STATEMENT No. 18 Statement of Traffic and Revenue for each Station for the Year ended 31 March 1930
1931	20,961	217		https://paperspast.natlib.govt.nz/parliamentary/appendix-to-the-journals-of-the-house-of-representatives/1931/I-II/1778	STATEMENT No. 18 Statement of Traffic and Revenue for each Station for the Year ended 31 March 1931
1932	18,270	234		https://paperspast.natlib.govt.nz/parliamentary/appendix-to-the-journals-of-the-house-of-representatives/1932/I-II/1934	STATEMENT No. 18 Statement of Traffic and Revenue for each Station for the Year ended 31 March 1932
1933	23,006	367		https://paperspast.natlib.govt.nz/parliamentary/appendix-to-the-journals-of-the-house-of-representatives/1933/I/1388	STATEMENT No. 18 Statement of Traffic and Revenue for each Station for the Year ended 31 March 1933
1934	27,071	390		https://paperspast.natlib.govt.nz/parliamentary/appendix-to-the-journals-of-the-house-of-representatives/1934/I/2278	STATEMENT No. 18 Statement of Traffic and Revenue for each Station for the Year ended 31 March 1934
1935	28,201	401		https://paperspast.natlib.govt.nz/parliamentary/appendix-to-the-journals-of-the-house-of-representatives/1935/I/1326	STATEMENT No. 18 Statement of Traffic and Revenue for each Station for the Year ended 31 March 1935
1936	27,293	373		https://paperspast.natlib.govt.nz/parliamentary/appendix-to-the-journals-of-the-house-of-representatives/1936/I/1552	STATEMENT No. 18 Statement of Traffic and Revenue for each Station for the Year ended 31 March 1936
1937	29,399	364		https://paperspast.natlib.govt.nz/parliamentary/appendix-to-the-journals-of-the-house-of-representatives/1937/I/1896	STATEMENT No. 18 Statement of Traffic and Revenue for each Station for the Year ended 31 March 1937
1938	28,030	329		https://paperspast.natlib.govt.nz/parliamentary/appendix-to-the-journals-of-the-house-of-representatives/1938/I/1652	STATEMENT No. 18 Statement of Traffic and Revenue for each Station for the Year ended 31 March 1938
1939	26,365	257		https://paperspast.natlib.govt.nz/parliamentary/appendix-to-the-journals-of-the-house-of-representatives/1939/I/1970	STATEMENT No. 18 Statement of Traffic and Revenue for each Station for the Year ended 31 March 1939
1940	25,771	280		https://paperspast.natlib.govt.nz/parliamentary/appendix-to-the-journals-of-the-house-of-representatives/1940/I/1314	STATEMENT No. 18 Statement of Traffic and Revenue for each Station for the Year ended 31 March 1940
1941	28,618	289		https://paperspast.natlib.govt.nz/parliamentary/appendix-to-the-journals-of-the-house-of-representatives/1941/I/1203	STATEMENT No. 18 Statement of Traffic and Revenue for each Station for the Year ended 31 March 1941
1942	37,228	306		https://paperspast.natlib.govt.nz/parliamentary/appendix-to-the-journals-of-the-house-of-representatives/1942/I/651	STATEMENT No. 18 Statement of Traffic and Revenue for each Station for the Year ended 31 March 1942
1943	51,297	318		https://paperspast.natlib.govt.nz/parliamentary/appendix-to-the-journals-of-the-house-of-representatives/1943/I/679	STATEMENT No. 18 Statement of Traffic and Revenue for each Station for the Year ended 31 March 1943
1944	52,091	281		https://paperspast.natlib.govt.nz/parliamentary/appendix-to-the-journals-of-the-house-of-representatives/1944/I/895	STATEMENT No. 18 Statement of Traffic and Revenue for each Station for the Year ended 31 March 1944
1945	40,542	173		https://paperspast.natlib.govt.nz/parliamentary/appendix-to-the-journals-of-the-house-of-representatives/1945/I/969	STATEMENT No. 18 Statement of Traffic and Revenue for each Station for the Year ended 31 March 1945
1946	37,342	193		https://paperspast.natlib.govt.nz/parliamentary/appendix-to-the-journals-of-the-house-of-representatives/1946/I/1548	STATEMENT No. 18 Statement of Traffic and Revenue for each Station for the Year ended 31 March 1946
1947	23,886	153		https://paperspast.natlib.govt.nz/parliamentary/appendix-to-the-journals-of-the-house-of-representatives/1947/I/2495	STATEMENT No. 18 Statement of Traffic and Revenue for each Station for the Year ended 31 March 1947
1948	17,221	44		https://paperspast.natlib.govt.nz/parliamentary/appendix-to-the-journals-of-the-house-of-representatives/1948/I/2521	STATEMENT No. 18 Statement of Traffic and Revenue for each Station for the Year ended 31 March 1948
1949	13,901	68		https://paperspast.natlib.govt.nz/parliamentary/appendix-to-the-journals-of-the-house-of-representatives/1949/I/2104	STATEMENT No. 18 Statement of Traffic and Revenue for each Station for the Year ended 31 March 1949
1950	11,797	55		https://paperspast.natlib.govt.nz/parliamentary/appendix-to-the-journals-of-the-house-of-representatives/1950/I/2366	STATEMENT No. 18 Statement of Traffic and Revenue for each Station for the Year ended 31 March 1950

	Former adjoining stations	
Terminus	Thames Branch	Piako; Line open, station closed
Motumaoho; Line open, station closed	East Coast Main Trunk; New Zealand Railways Department	Kiwitahi; Line open, station closed

=== Road network ===
Roads in Morrinsville were not metalled until the late 19th century. Roads in the town were dusty and uneven in summer and in winter they were too muddy for horses to progress at a canter. The ride from Annandale to the church in Morrinsville, which is two and a half miles, took an hour.

Transport out of Morrinsville was initially difficult with the only proper road leading to Mangateparu; however, it was quite treacherous and prone to flooding.

=== Walkways ===
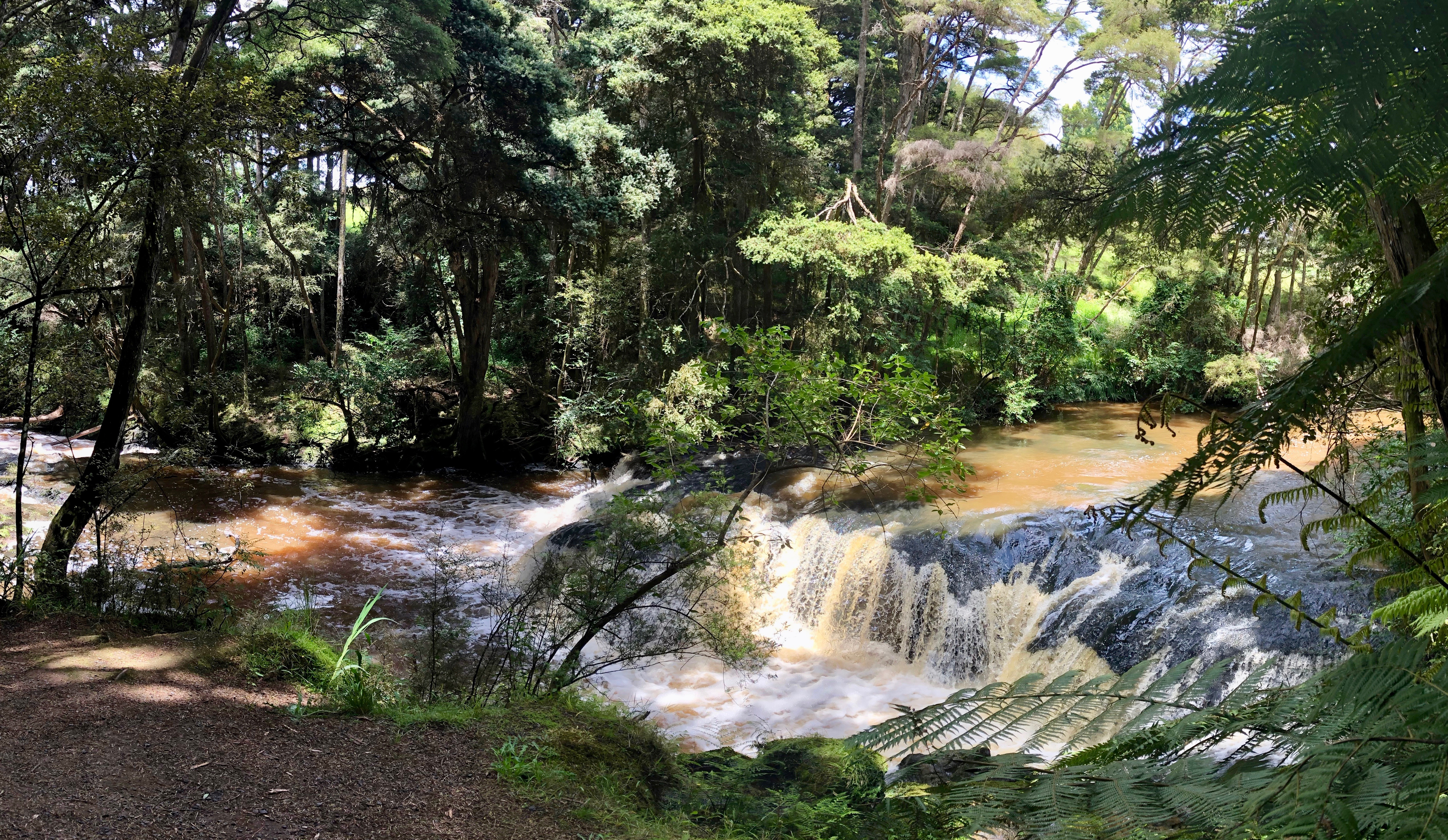
Waterfall on the Waitakaruru Stream, beside the Morrinsville River Walk

A 1.8 km (1.1 mi) walkway runs beside Waitakaruru Stream and one of 1.3 km (0.81 mi) beside the Piako River. There was a plan in 2008 to combine these walkways into a route of 5.24 km (3.26 mi). There are also shorter walkways on the north east edge of town.

== Notable places ==
- The Nottingham Castle Hotel was originally built in 1875 as the Jolly Cripple and established as the Nottingham Castle Hotel in 1880. It burnt down in 1913 and was replaced in 1914. It is one of the oldest buildings in Morrinsville and serves a centre for the town.

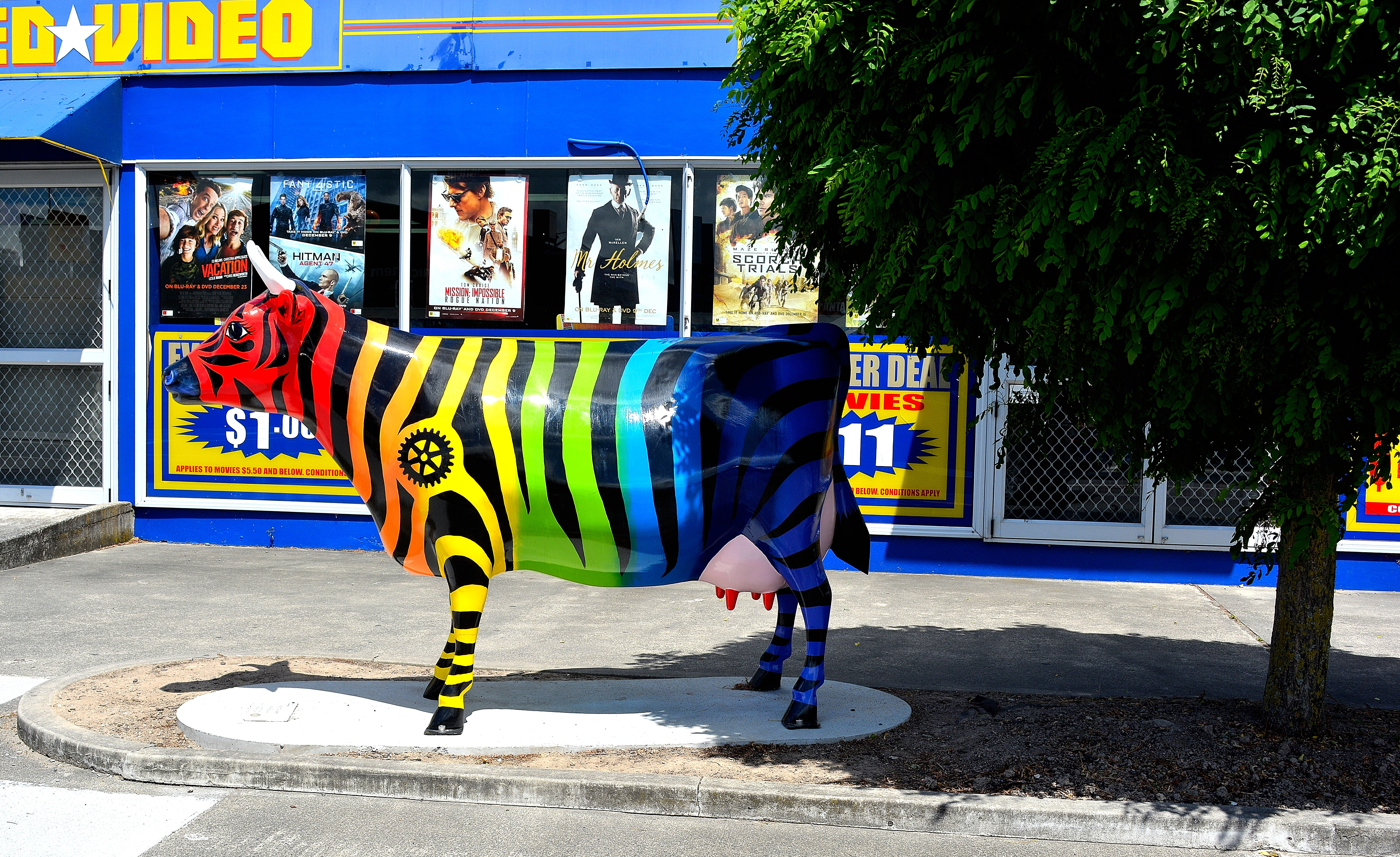
The commercial area has life-sized gaily-painted statues of cows on many street corners.

=== CowParade ===
Fibre glass cows have been in Morrinsville streets since a Herd of Cows project began in 2015, when 15 life size cows were made. By 2019 there were 60, including a 'mega' 6.5 m (21 ft) cow, named Mabel, built in 2017, in recognition of Laurie Maber, Morrinsville's mayor in 1971, who suggested a large cow should be built. However, a committee was not formed until a Matamata-Piako District councillor saw CowParade in Chicago. The number may not increase, as a new mould would cost around $20,000. Each cow costs $6,000.

=== Reserves ===
In 1970 a 60 acres (24 ha) farm that bordered the Kuranui Reserve was purchased by the Piako County Council. This was gazetted as a reserve and named Roy Scott Recreation Reserve, in honour of the county chairman. In 1972 a further 27 acres (11 ha) was added onto the reserve.

== Sports clubs ==
- Kereone Rugby & Sports Club, established in 1919.

== Climate ==
Climate data for Toenepi (8km SSE of Morrinsville, 1991–2020)
Month	Jan	Feb	Mar	Apr	May	Jun	Jul	Aug	Sep	Oct	Nov	Dec	Year
Mean daily maximum °C (°F)	24.5 (76.1)	25.0 (77.0)	23.3 (73.9)	20.5 (68.9)	17.5 (63.5)	15.0 (59.0)	14.3 (57.7)	15.2 (59.4)	16.6 (61.9)	18.1 (64.6)	20.0 (68.0)	22.3 (72.1)	19.4 (66.8)
Daily mean °C (°F)	18.9 (66.0)	19.4 (66.9)	17.6 (63.7)	15.1 (59.2)	12.5 (54.5)	10.2 (50.4)	9.5 (49.1)	10.4 (50.7)	11.9 (53.4)	13.4 (56.1)	15.0 (59.0)	17.4 (63.3)	14.3 (57.7)
Mean daily minimum °C (°F)	13.3 (55.9)	13.9 (57.0)	11.9 (53.4)	9.7 (49.5)	7.5 (45.5)	5.5 (41.9)	4.6 (40.3)	5.6 (42.1)	7.3 (45.1)	8.7 (47.7)	10.1 (50.2)	12.4 (54.3)	9.2 (48.6)
Average rainfall mm (inches)	81.1 (3.19)	73.3 (2.89)	90.2 (3.55)	89.3 (3.52)	99.6 (3.92)	113.5 (4.47)	128.3 (5.05)	118.5 (4.67)	108.8 (4.28)	100.7 (3.96)	84.9 (3.34)	96.9 (3.81)	1,185.1 (46.65)
Source: NIWA (rainfall 1971–2000)

== Notable people ==
- Stephen Allen (1882–1964), mayor of Morrinsville
- Jacinda Ardern (born 1980), former Prime Minister of New Zealand and former leader of the Labour Party
- Constable Edward Best (1899–1941), born in nearby Annandale
- Maria Dallas (born 1946), pop and country singer
- Ross Ferguson (born 1943), botanist specialising in kiwifruit horticulture
- John Money (1921–2006), psychologist and author known for his controversial research in gender identity
- Hemi Taylor (born 1963), former Wales rugby union player
