= Walton, New Zealand =

Locality in Waikato, New Zealand

Walton
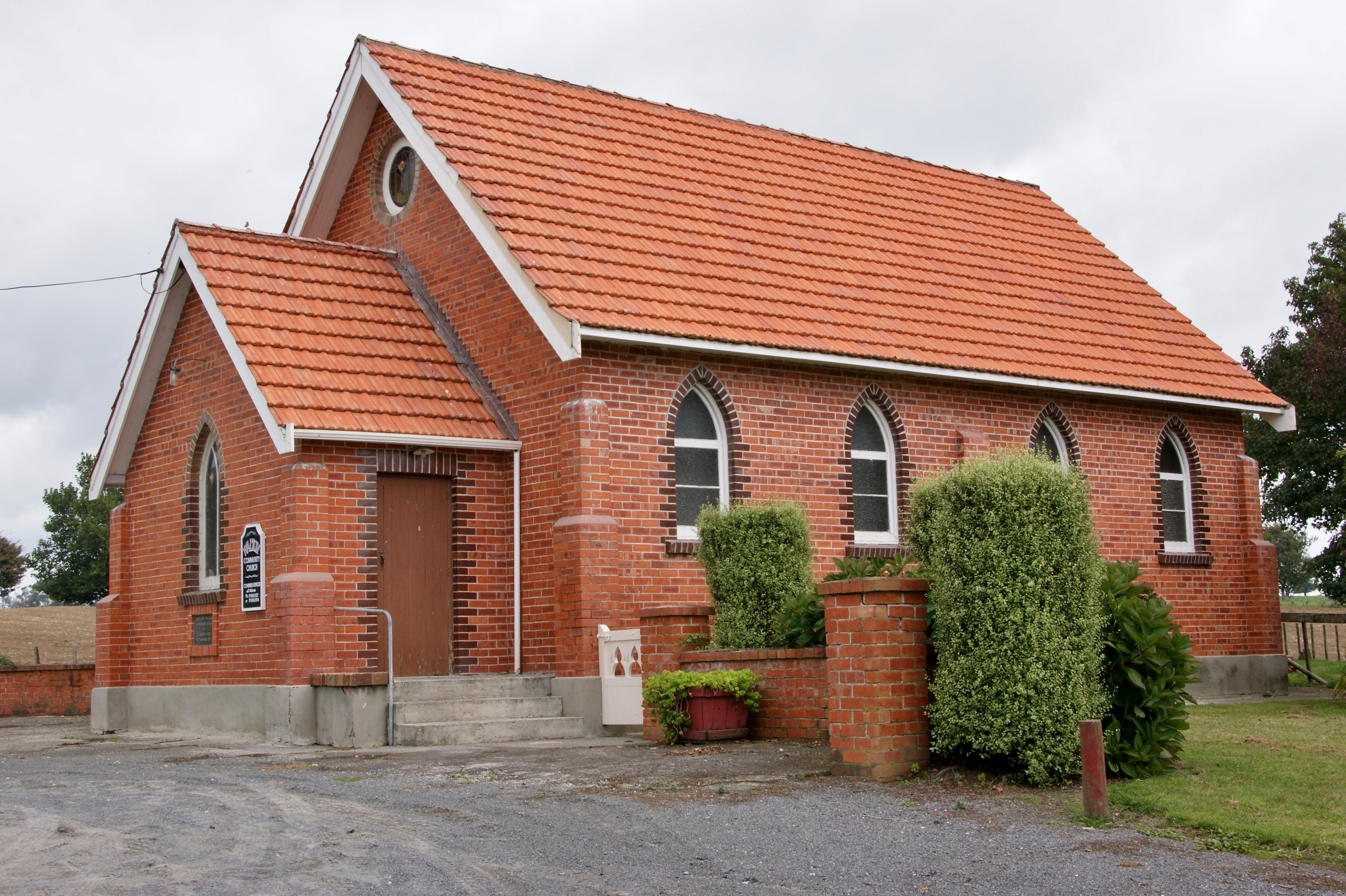
- Walton Community Church
- Interactive map of Walton
- Coordinates: 37.731°S 175.699°E
- Country: New Zealand
- Region: Waikato Region
- District: Matamata-Piako District
- Ward: Matamata General Ward
- Electorates: Waikato; Hauraki-Waikato (Māori)

Government
  - Territorial Authority: Matamata-Piako District Council
  - Regional council: Waikato Regional Council
  - Mayor of Matamata-Piako: Ash Tanner
  - Waikato MP: Tim van de Molen
  - Hauraki-Waikato MP: Hana-Rawhiti Maipi-Clarke

Area
  - Total: 15.86 km^{2} (6.12 sq mi)

Population (2023 Census)
  - Total: 180
  - Density: 11/km^{2} (29/sq mi)

Walton is a settlement in New Zealand. It is sited at the junction of Walton Road and Morrinsville Walton Road, in the Central Waikato Region.

The Walton Golf Club is 2 kilometres from the centre of the village.

== History ==
Major John Wilson purchased approximately 10,283 acres (4,161 ha) of the Te-Pae-o-tu-Rawaru No.1 block. He later subdivided and sold this land and in 1872 Mr F. D. Rich purchased some of the land. He named his section Richmond and subdivided it in 1879. The Long Depression hit the area in the 1880s and many properties came under ownership of the bank, the properties controlled by the bank became known as Richmond Downs with the other areas being known as Walton.

Construction finished on Walton Hall in 1913, the year before the outbreak of WW1. The hall became a focal point of the district’s war efforts.

== Governance ==
In 1875 Walton was governed by the Waitoa Road Board. In 1908 Walton became a riding of Piako County.

== Industry ==
The area is predominantly dairying with some maize growing and meat chicken farming. A large thoroughbred horse stud also has its base there.

Industry is small consisting mainly of small service industries but there is a large grain drying plant sited next to the railway line.

=== Railway ===
Walton had a flag station on the East Coast Main Trunk, opened from Morrinsville to Tīrau (then called Oxford) on Monday 8 March 1886 by the Thames Valley & Rotorua Railway Co. New Zealand Railways Department took over the line on 1 April 1886. There was a 14 ft (4.3 m) by 8 ft (2.4 m) shelter shed, a 40 ft (12 m) by 30 ft (9.1 m) shed, cattle yards and a cottage. By 1896 a platform, cart approach, loading bank, sheep yards and a passing loop for 21 wagons had been added. The loop had been extended to 38 by 1911 and 65 by 1964.

Walton station closed to passengers on 2 February 1981 and to goods on 29 March 1981, except private siding traffic and was closed completely on Monday 3 November 1986. There is now only a single track through the station site. There are passing loops at Kereone, 5.73 km (3.56 mi) to the north and at Hemopo 13.26 km (8.24 mi) to the east.

	Former adjoining stations	
Kiwitahi; Line open, station closed 9.54 km (5.93 mi)	East Coast Main Trunk	Apata; Line open, station closed 29.77 km (18.50 mi) via Kaimai Tunnel
Terminus	Kinleith Branch	Waharoa; Line open, station closed 6 km (3.7 mi)

== Geography ==
To the east of Walton is the community of Wardville.

== Demographics ==
Walton and its surrounds cover 15.86 km^{2} (6.12 sq mi). Walton is part of the larger Richmond Downs-Wardville statistical area.

Historical population for Walton and surrounds
Year	Pop.	±% p.a.
2006	213	—
2013	192	−1.47%
2018	192	+0.00%
2023	180	−1.28%

Walton had a population of 180 in the 2023 New Zealand census, a decrease of 12 people (−6.2%) since the 2018 census, and a decrease of 12 people (−6.2%) since the 2013 census. There were 96 males and 84 females in 72 dwellings. 3.3% of people identified as LGBTIQ+. The median age was 39.2 years (compared with 38.1 years nationally). There were 30 people (16.7%) aged under 15 years, 36 (20.0%) aged 15 to 29, 90 (50.0%) aged 30 to 64, and 24 (13.3%) aged 65 or older.

People could identify as more than one ethnicity. The results were 88.3% European (Pākehā); 15.0% Māori; 6.7% Asian; and 1.7% Middle Eastern, Latin American and African New Zealanders (MELAA). English was spoken by 96.7%, Māori language by 3.3%, and other languages by 5.0%. No language could be spoken by 1.7% (e.g. too young to talk). The percentage of people born overseas was 15.0, compared with 28.8% nationally.

Religious affiliations were 31.7% Christian, 1.7% Māori religious beliefs, 1.7% Buddhist, 1.7% New Age, and 3.3% other religions. People who answered that they had no religion were 60.0%, and 5.0% of people did not answer the census question.

Of those at least 15 years old, 18 (12.0%) people had a bachelor's or higher degree, 96 (64.0%) had a post-high school certificate or diploma, and 30 (20.0%) people exclusively held high school qualifications. The median income was $51,900, compared with $41,500 nationally. 18 people (12.0%) earned over $100,000 compared to 12.1% nationally. The employment status of those at least 15 was that 84 (56.0%) people were employed full-time, 27 (18.0%) were part-time, and 6 (4.0%) were unemployed.

In 1916, Walton had a population of 320

In 2013, the population was 129, and this is expected to be stable through to 2045.

=== Richmond Downs-Wardville statistical area ===
Richmond Downs-Wardville statistical area covers 206.73 km^{2} (79.82 sq mi) and had an estimated population of 1,360 as of June 2025, with a population density of 6.6 people per km^{2}.

Historical population for Richmond Downs-Wardville
Year	Pop.	±% p.a.
2006	1,311	—
2013	1,221	−1.01%
2018	1,278	+0.92%
2023	1,284	+0.09%

Richmond Downs-Wardville had a population of 1,284 in the 2023 New Zealand census, an increase of 6 people (0.5%) since the 2018 census, and an increase of 63 people (5.2%) since the 2013 census. There were 687 males and 594 females in 462 dwellings. 1.6% of people identified as LGBTIQ+. The median age was 36.5 years (compared with 38.1 years nationally). There were 285 people (22.2%) aged under 15 years, 207 (16.1%) aged 15 to 29, 609 (47.4%) aged 30 to 64, and 180 (14.0%) aged 65 or older.

People could identify as more than one ethnicity. The results were 81.3% European (Pākehā); 19.4% Māori; 1.6% Pasifika; 7.9% Asian; 0.7% Middle Eastern, Latin American and African New Zealanders (MELAA); and 1.6% other, which includes people giving their ethnicity as "New Zealander". English was spoken by 96.3%, Māori language by 6.5%, Samoan by 0.5%, and other languages by 5.1%. No language could be spoken by 2.8% (e.g. too young to talk). New Zealand Sign Language was known by 0.5%. The percentage of people born overseas was 15.0, compared with 28.8% nationally.

Religious affiliations were 34.3% Christian, 0.5% Māori religious beliefs, 0.7% Buddhist, 0.2% New Age, and 1.6% other religions. People who answered that they had no religion were 54.4%, and 8.2% of people did not answer the census question.

Of those at least 15 years old, 153 (15.3%) people had a bachelor's or higher degree, 591 (59.2%) had a post-high school certificate or diploma, and 249 (24.9%) people exclusively held high school qualifications. The median income was $46,200, compared with $41,500 nationally. 96 people (9.6%) earned over $100,000 compared to 12.1% nationally. The employment status of those at least 15 was that 528 (52.9%) people were employed full-time, 186 (18.6%) were part-time, and 15 (1.5%) were unemployed.

== Education ==
Walton School is a co-educational state primary school for students Year 1 to 6, with a roll of 125 as of July 2026. It began in 1896 and initially was run out of a railway cottage and had 13 pupils. In 1905 a proper school building was opened.

== Notable people ==
- Judith Collins National Party politician
- Sue Moroney Labour Party politician

== Reserves ==
A 126 acres (51 ha) farm near Walton was purchased by the Piako County Council as a reserve. It has been leased to the Walton Golf Club, which manages an eighteen-hole course.
