= Tāmihana =

Tāmihana or Tamihana is both a given name and a surname. It is a Māori transliteration of the name Thompson. Notable people with the name include:

== Given name ==
- Tāmihana Huata (c. 1821–1908), New Zealand teacher and missionary
- Tāmihana Te Rauparaha (1820s–1876), New Zealand Māori leader, Christian evangelist, assessor, writer and farmer

== Surname ==
- Wiremu Tamihana (c. 1805–1866), Māori chief and political leader
