= Piako railway station =

Defunct railway station in New Zealand

General information
- Location: 37°38'39.0"S 175°33'30.6"E; New Zealand
- Coordinates: 37°38′39.0″S 175°33′30.6″E
- Line: Thames Branch

History
- Opened: 1/3/1886
- Closed: passengers 22/11/1948 freight 14/10/1968
- Former names: Murray's until 8/12/1912
Location

Piako was a flag station, at the junction of SH26 and Horrell Rd, on the former Thames Branch, 2.87 km (1.78 mi) east of Morrinsville and 4.03 km (2.50 mi) west of Tatuanui.

The area was owned in succession by politicians:

- Thomas Gillies
- William Murray, who built nearby Annandale House about 1881 and planned a township, hoping the Kinleith Branch junction would be here, rather than Morrinsville
- William Shepherd Allen who built sheep pens and a loading race in May 1890 and stockyards in 1898. The Allen family owned the farm from 1887 to 1920 and still owns Annandale House, which has been a Category 1 listed building since 1989.

Work was continuing when the branch opened to Te Aroha. Murray's had a platform, then a shelter was added in 1887. In December 1912 it was renamed Piako, as had been expected when it opened. It closed to passengers on 22 November 1948. The station building was removed in December 1961 and the stock yards in 1968. The site became Murray Oaks Scenic Reserve in 1975.
