= Gordon, New Zealand =

Locality in New Zealand

Coordinates: 37°41′30″S 175°49′18″E

Gordon is a locality in the North Island of New Zealand.

== Etymology ==
Alexander Wyclif Reed's Place Names of New Zealand states that Gordon is named after Arthur Hamilton Gordon, governor of New Zealand from 1880 to 1882. Land of the Three Rivers: A centennial history of Piako County states it was named after Charles George Gordon, an accomplished British army officer who died during the siege of Khartoum in 1885.

== History ==
Gordon is part of the Waiharakeke Block. Following the closure of the Waiorongomai gold mines, the land was subdivided and sold to settlers. The original settlers lived in makeshift camps and rooms carved out of the hillside before houses were constructed.

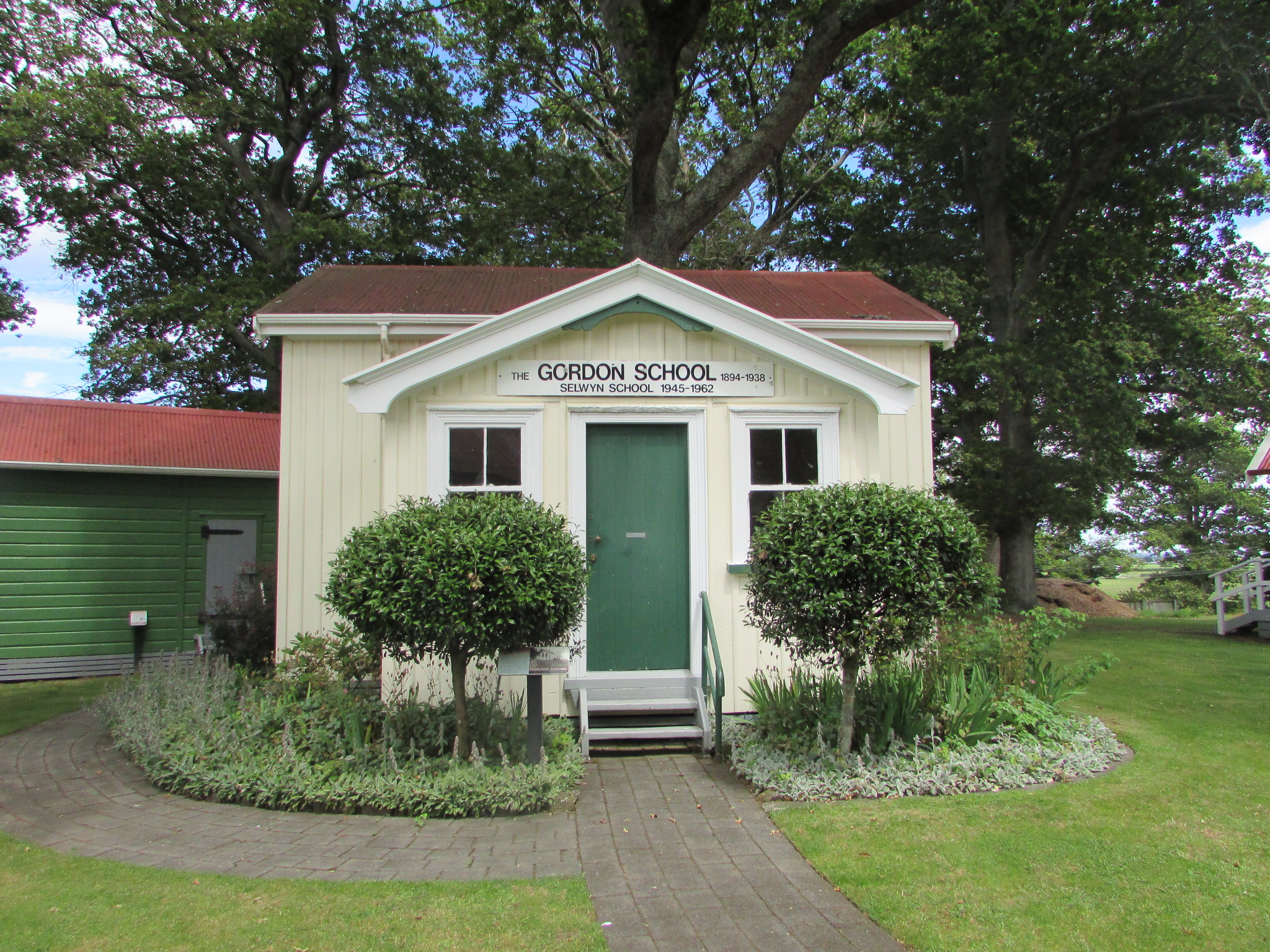
Gordon School Building

Gordon had her own library and school, with the teacher serving as the librarian. In 1950, with easier access to motor transport, the library was demolished with the books being given to local residents. Gordon Public School was originally called Armadale School for the planned Armadale Township. The township was never established and in 1896 it was renamed Gordon School. The building was in use until 1938 when a new school for Gordon was erected. The Gordon School Building fell into desuetude until being moved onto Selwyn School, near Te Poi, in 1946. 17 years later Selwyn School merged into Te Poi School and the building was sold to a farm and used to store hay. In 1983 it was moved onto the Firth Tower Museum in Matamata. The building is registered as category 2 with Heritage New Zealand.

In July 1963, a plane crashed into the Kaimais. Locals from Gordon were some of the first assist in search and rescue as the crash was nearby.
