= Matamata Airport =

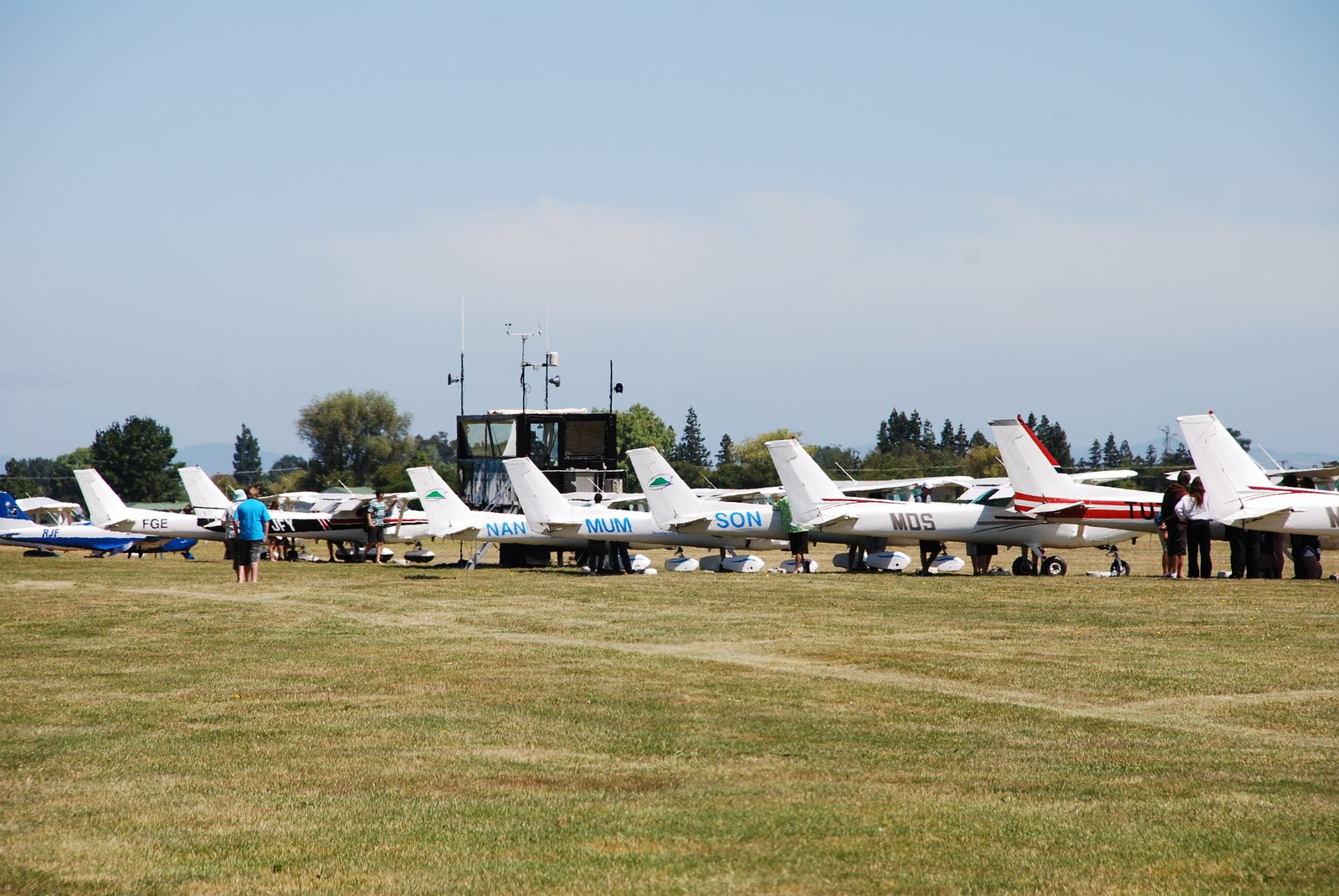
- IATA: MTA; ICAO: NZMA

Summary
- Airport type: Public
- Serves: Matamata
- Location: Waharoa
- Coordinates: 37°44′4″S 175°44′24″E
- Interactive map of Matamata Airport

Matamata Airport, formerly Waharoa Aerodrome (IATA: MTA, ICAO: NZMA), is the airport serving Matamata, New Zealand.

It is just over 3 km (1.9 mi) north of Waharoa, 9 km (5.6 mi) north of Matamata, was formed in 1942 and transferred to council ownership in 1965. It has two grass runways.

== History ==
In 1966 the aerodrome was leased for sheep grazing which resulted in a pump being installed that later connected to a clubhouse and ablution block. The Matamata Soaring Centre later used the aerodrome for gliding and power flying.
