= Matamata-Piako District Council =

Territorial authority of New Zealand

Coordinates: 37.8115574°S 175.4932056°E

Matamata-Piako District Council Te Kaunihera ā-Rohe o Matamata-Piako

Type
- Type: Unicameral of Matamata-Piako District
- Houses: Governing Body
- Term limits: None

History
- Founded: 6 March 1989

Leadership
- Mayor: Ash Tanner
- Deputy mayor: James Sainsbury
- CEO: Tumu Whakarae

Structure
- Seats: 13 seats (1 mayor, 12 ward seats)
- Political groups: Independent (13)
- Length of term: 3 years

Elections
- Last election: 2025
- Next election: 2028

Website
- mpdc.govt.nz

Matamata-Piako District Council (Māori: Te Kaunihera ā-Rohe o Matamata-Piako) is the territorial authority for the Matamata-Piako District of New Zealand's North Island. It serves as the district's local government, with the Waikato Regional Council serving as the regional authority. It has existed since the 1989 reforms to local government.

The council has 12 councillors and is chaired by the mayor of Matamata-Piako (currently Ash Tanner since October 2025).

In 2026 25,390 were registered to vote in the District.

== Composition ==
The council currently consists of a mayor elected at-large and 12 councillors, elected from four wards. One councillor is returned from Te Toa Horopū ā-Matamata-Piako Māori ward, which covers the entire district, four from Morrinsville general ward, three from Te Aroha general ward, and four from Matamata general ward.

The current mayor is Ash Tanner, who was elected in the 2025 local elections, having previously served as mayor for the district from 2019 until he stood down in 2022.

=== Current council ===
The present council was elected in the 2025 local elections:

Matamata-Piako District Council, 2025–2028
Position	Name	Ward	Affiliation
Mayor	Ash Tanner	At-large	Independent
Deputy mayor	James Sainsbury	Matamata	Independent
Councillor	Vincent Anderson	Matamata	Independent
Councillor	Rewiti Vaimoso	Matamata	Independent
Councillor	Sue Whiting	Matamata	Independent
Councillor	Grace Bonnar	Morrinsville	Independent
Councillor	Bruce Dewhurst	Morrinsville	Independent
Councillor	Dayne Horne	Morrinsville	Independent
Councillor	James Thomas	Morrinsville	Independent
Councillor	Tyrel Glass	Te Aroha	Independent
Councillor	Andrew McGiven	Te Aroha	Independent
Councillor	Greg Marshall	Te Aroha	Independent
Councillor	Gary Thompson	Te Toa Horopū ā Matamata-Piako	Independent

== History ==
The council was established in 1989, through the merger of:

- Piako County Council, established in 1876
- Te Aroha County Council, established in 1898
- Morrinsville Borough Council, established in 1921
- Matamata Borough Council, established in 1935

== Elections ==
- 1989
- 1992
- 1995
- 1998
- 2001
- 2004
- 2007
- 2010
- 2013
- 2016
- 2019
- 2022
- 2025
