= Mayor of Matamata-Piako =

Head of a municipal government in New Zealand

- Incumbent; Ash Tanner since 16 October 2025
- Style: His/Her Worship
- Member of: Matamata-Piako District Council
- Seat: Te Aroha
- Term length: 3 years, renewable
- Formation: 1989
- Deputy: James Sainsbury
- Salary: $134,533
- Website: Official website

The mayor of Matamata-Piako officiates over the Matamata-Piako District of New Zealand's North Island.

Ash Tanner is the current mayor of Matamata-Piako. Tanner was elected in the 2025 local elections, having previously served as mayor for the district from 2019 until he stood down in 2022.

== List of mayors ==
Since its formation in 1989, Matamata-Piako District has had five mayors, with one holding the position on two non-consecutive occasions. The following is a complete list:

	Name	Portrait	Term
1	Ken Thomas		1989–1998
2	Hugh Vercoe		1998–2013
3	Jan Barnes		2013–2019
4	Ash Tanner		2019–2022
5	Adrienne Wilcock		2022–2025
(4)	Ash Tanner		2025–present
