= Tapapa =

- Interactive map of Tapapa
- Coordinates: 37.987°S 175.842°E
- Country: New Zealand
- Region: Waikato
- Territorial authority: South Waikato District
- Ward: Tīrau Ward
- Electorates: Waikato; Te Tai Hauāuru (Māori)

Government
  - Territorial Authority: South Waikato District Council
  - Regional council: Waikato Regional Council
  - Mayor of South Waikato: Gary Petley
  - Waikato MP: Tim van de Molen
  - Te Tai Hauāuru MP: Debbie Ngarewa-Packer

Area
  - Total: 146.62 km^{2} (56.61 sq mi)

Population (2023 census)
  - Total: 615
  - Density: 4.19/km^{2} (10.9/sq mi)
- Time zone: UTC+12 (NZST)
  - Summer (DST): UTC+13 (NZDT)
- Postcode: 3410
- Area code: 07

Tapapa (Māori: Tāpapa) is a rural community in the Waikato region of New Zealand's North Island.

== Marae ==
Tapapa has two marae within the area:

- Tāpapa Marae is a traditional meeting ground for the Ngāti Raukawa hapū of Ngāti Tūkorehe, Rangitawhia and Te Rangi. In October 2020, the Government committed $1,259,392 from the Provincial Growth Fund to upgrade Tāpapa Marae and 7 other Ngāti Raukawa marae, creating 18 jobs.
- Ruapeka Marae and Rangimarie meeting house is a meeting place of the Ngāti Raukawa hapū of Ngāti Tūkorehe. In October 2020, the Government committed $497,510 from the Provincial Growth Fund to upgrade the Ruapeka Marae, creating an estimate 68 jobs.

== Demographics ==
Tapapa locality covers 146.62 km^{2} (56.61 sq mi) It is part of the larger Tīrau statistical area.

Historical population
Year	Pop.	±% p.a.
2006	567	—
2013	525	−1.09%
2018	561	+1.34%
2023	615	+1.86%

Tapapa had a population of 615 in the 2023 New Zealand census, an increase of 54 people (9.6%) since the 2018 census, and an increase of 90 people (17.1%) since the 2013 census. There were 309 males and 297 females in 213 dwellings. 2.9% of people identified as LGBTIQ+. There were 144 people (23.4%) aged under 15 years, 90 (14.6%) aged 15 to 29, 291 (47.3%) aged 30 to 64, and 84 (13.7%) aged 65 or older.

People could identify as more than one ethnicity. The results were 85.9% European (Pākehā), 24.9% Māori, 2.4% Pasifika, 1.0% Asian, and 2.0% other, which includes people giving their ethnicity as "New Zealander". English was spoken by 95.6%, Māori by 3.9%, Samoan by 1.0%, and other languages by 3.4%. No language could be spoken by 3.4% (e.g. too young to talk). New Zealand Sign Language was known by 1.5%. The percentage of people born overseas was 12.2, compared with 28.8% nationally.

Religious affiliations were 25.9% Christian, 0.5% Islam, 1.0% Māori religious beliefs, 0.5% Buddhist, 1.0% New Age, and 1.0% other religions. People who answered that they had no religion were 60.5%, and 9.3% of people did not answer the census question.

Of those at least 15 years old, 66 (14.0%) people had a bachelor's or higher degree, 291 (61.8%) had a post-high school certificate or diploma, and 102 (21.7%) people exclusively held high school qualifications. 69 people (14.6%) earned over $100,000 compared to 12.1% nationally. The employment status of those at least 15 was 270 (57.3%) full-time, 78 (16.6%) part-time, and 21 (4.5%) unemployed.

== Education ==
Tapapa School was open by 1898 and voluntarily merged with Okoroire School in 2003 on the latter school's site to form Kuranui Primary School.
