= Lichfield, New Zealand =

Rural settlement in the Waikato Region in New Zealand

Lichfield
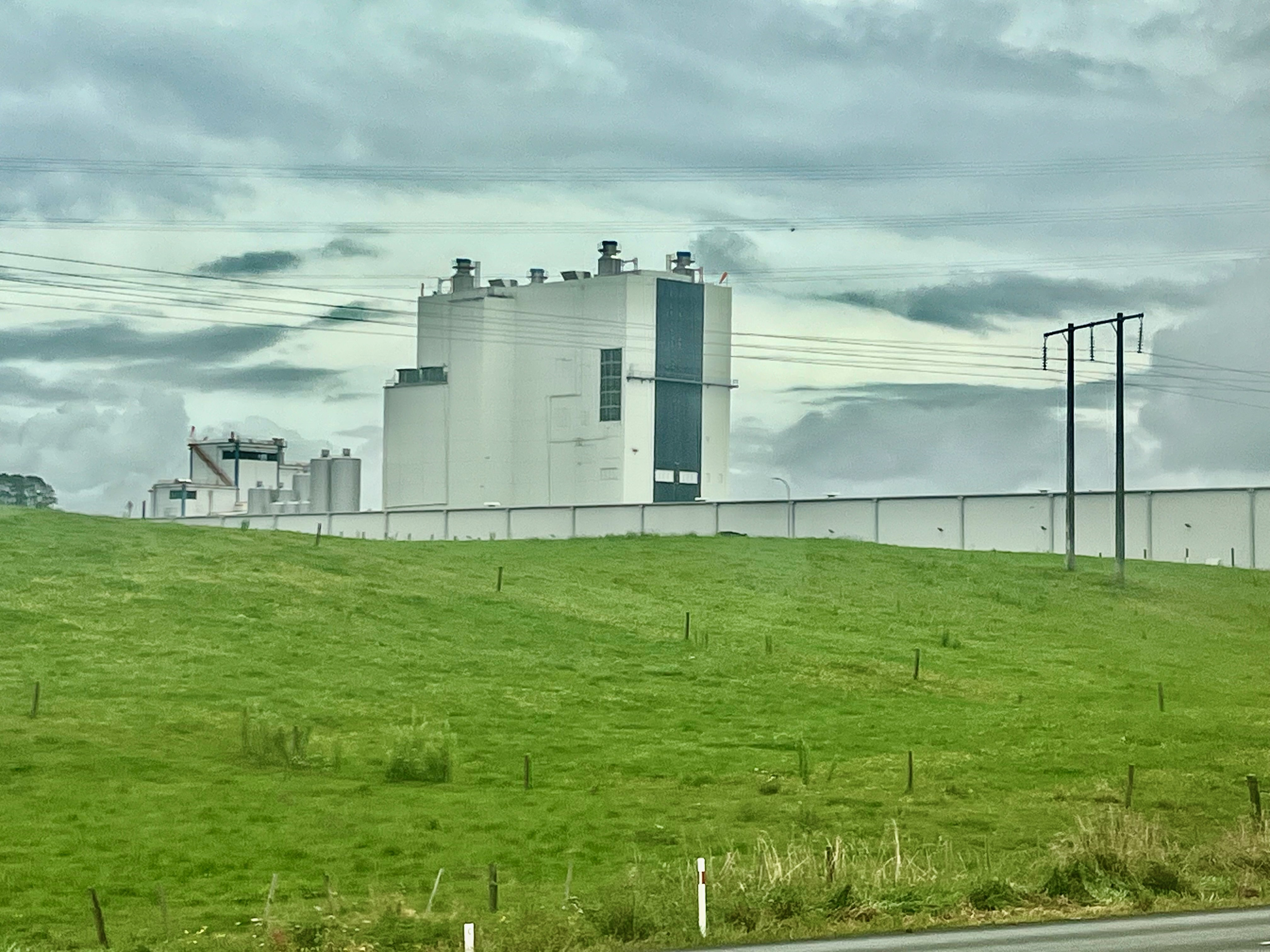
- Fonterra Tokoroa, just south of Lichfield
- Interactive map of Lichfield
- Coordinates: 38.105°S 175.818°E
- Country: New Zealand
- Region: Waikato
- Territorial authority: South Waikato District
- Ward: Putāruru Ward
- Electorate: Taupō (general); Te Tai Hauāuru (Māori)

Government
  - Territorial Authority: South Waikato District Council
  - Regional council: Waikato Regional Council
  - Mayor of South Waikato: Gary Petley
  - Taupō MP: Louise Upston
  - Te Tai Hauāuru MP: Debbie Ngarewa-Packer

Area
  - Total: 119.17 km^{2} (46.01 sq mi)
- Elevation: 237 m (778 ft)

Population (2023 census)
  - Total: 453
  - Density: 3.80/km^{2} (9.85/sq mi)
- Time zone: UTC+12 (NZST)
  - Summer (DST): UTC+13 (NZDT)
- Postcode: 3482
- Area code: 07

Lichfield is a rural settlement in the South Waikato District and Waikato region of New Zealand's North Island.

The community is centred around the Lichfield Fonterra facility, which opened in 1995. The factory features the largest cheese factory in the southern hemisphere, consisting of separate dry salt and brine salt plants. It also features the largest milk dryer in the world, installed during a major expansion in 2016. The dryer can process 30 metric tonnes of milk every hour, and store 40,000 metric tonnes of whole milk powder. The dryer is used during the peak season, with production varying based on prices. The Fonterra site employs 330 people, with extra staff being stationed there during installations. Almost 90% of the output travels by rail from a covered siding at the factory.

The local Lichfields Lands farm converted from sheep to dairy and beef farming in the 1960s. It is now an Open Brethren operation, donating its proceeds to charity.

South African-born artist Sonnett Olls opened an art gallery in Lichfield in 2019.

A Red Cross health shuttle transports Lichfield residents to health appointments in Tīrau.

== History ==
In 1884 Lichfield was planned as a city of 8,000 people, on over 700 lots, at the centre of 80,000 ha (200,000 acres), purchased from Ngāti Raukawa by the Patetere Land Association. In 1882, at a time when the Rotorua railway was planned to pass through Lichfield, they formed a company in London to encourage settlers and construction of the 67.28 km (41.81 mi) railway link from Morrinsville began the same year. The attempt failed. Another was made to sell lots for a town in 1905.

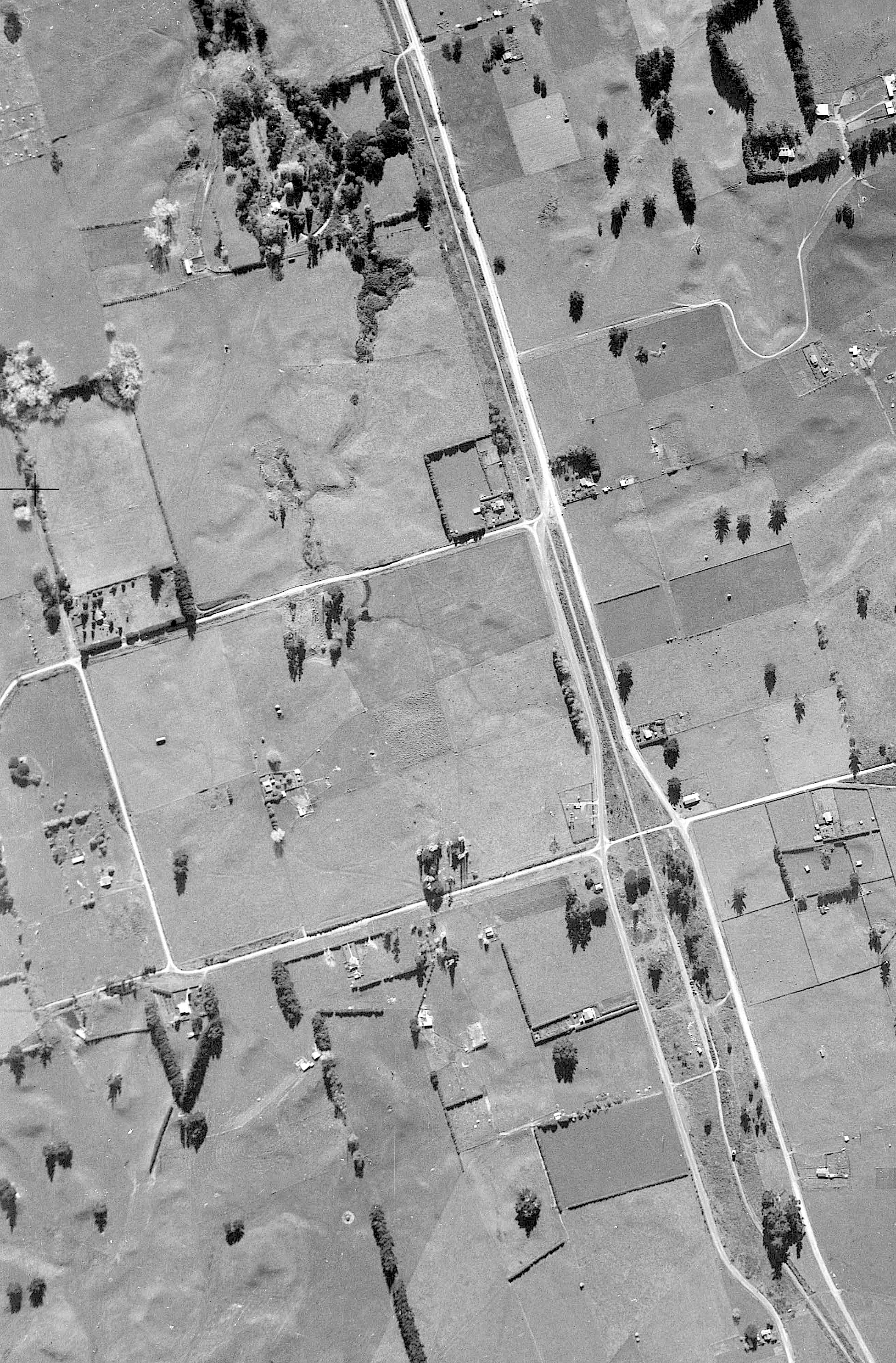
Lichfield in 1944. The railway station was at the bottom right of the photo

== Demographics ==
Lichfield locality covers 119.17 km^{2} (46.01 sq mi) It is part of the larger Putāruru Rural statistical area.

Historical population
Year	Pop.	±% p.a.
2006	513	—
2013	426	−2.62%
2018	468	+1.90%
2023	453	−0.65%

Lichfield had a population of 453 in the 2023 New Zealand census, a decrease of 15 people (−3.2%) since the 2018 census, and an increase of 27 people (6.3%) since the 2013 census. There were 219 males, 231 females, and 3 people of other genders in 177 dwellings. 2.0% of people identified as LGBTIQ+. There were 93 people (20.5%) aged under 15 years, 84 (18.5%) aged 15 to 29, 207 (45.7%) aged 30 to 64, and 69 (15.2%) aged 65 or older.

People could identify as more than one ethnicity. The results were 85.4% European (Pākehā), 22.5% Māori, 1.3% Pasifika, 2.0% Asian, and 2.6% other, which includes people giving their ethnicity as "New Zealander". English was spoken by 95.4%, Māori by 5.3%, and other languages by 5.3%. No language could be spoken by 2.6% (e.g. too young to talk). The percentage of people born overseas was 9.9, compared with 28.8% nationally.

Religious affiliations were 28.5% Christian, 0.7% Hindu, and 1.3% other religions. People who answered that they had no religion were 57.6%, and 10.6% of people did not answer the census question.

Of those at least 15 years old, 51 (14.2%) people had a bachelor's or higher degree, 240 (66.7%) had a post-high school certificate or diploma, and 69 (19.2%) people exclusively held high school qualifications. 36 people (10.0%) earned over $100,000 compared to 12.1% nationally. The employment status of those at least 15 was 228 (63.3%) full-time, 42 (11.7%) part-time, and 3 (0.8%) unemployed.

== Education ==
Lichfield School is a co-educational state primary school, with a roll of 86 as of July 2026. It opened as a private school in 1884, and was accepted as a public school by the Education Board in 1885.

== Railway ==
The railway corridor through Lichfield has been used by several railways, beginning in the 1880s with the Thames Valley and Rotorua Railway. The line is now occupied by Kiwirail's freight-only Kinleith Branch.

=== Railway station ===
Lichfield railway station opened in 1886, closed on 1 March 1897, was reopened by Taupo Totara Timber Company in September 1905, closed on 26 October 1944, reopened on 12 June 1950, and closed on 6 August 1978. The Kinleith Branch continued operating as a freight line.

During construction of the Kinleith Branch in the late 1940s there was speculation that Lichfield would grow. From Monday 12 June 1950, the station reopened for parcels and goods. A 30 ft (9.1 m) by 12 ft (3.7 m) goods shed, with verandah, was moved from Karangahake to Lichfield and a 40 ft (12 m) long loading bank, with ramped ends, was built. By 12 November 1951 the line was sufficiently ballasted to allow trains to run at 15 mph (24 km/h). The offices were then moved to Tokoroa.

In 1959 the gent's convenience was in a bad state of repair and was removed. By 1960 the goods shed floor and weatherboards were decayed, the windows broken and the doors lying on the floor, so it was demolished. By 1970 the station was little used and it closed to all traffic from Sunday 6 August 1978. It was then used for the storage of wagons. A single track, loading bank, water tower and sheds remain.

	Former adjoining stations	
Putāruru; Line open, station closed 7.83 km (4.87 mi)	Kinleith Branch	Tokoroa; Line open, station closed 12.89 km (8.01 mi)

=== Thames Valley and Rotorua Railway ===
Work on the line from Oxford (Tīrau) to Lichfield started in 1883. The Thames Valley and Rotorua Railway directors inspected the route and stayed at Lichfield in October 1883. The line reached Oxford (Tīrau) on 8 March 1886 and was extended to Lichfield on Monday 21 June 1886. New Zealand Railways Department (NZR) took over the line on 1 April 1886.

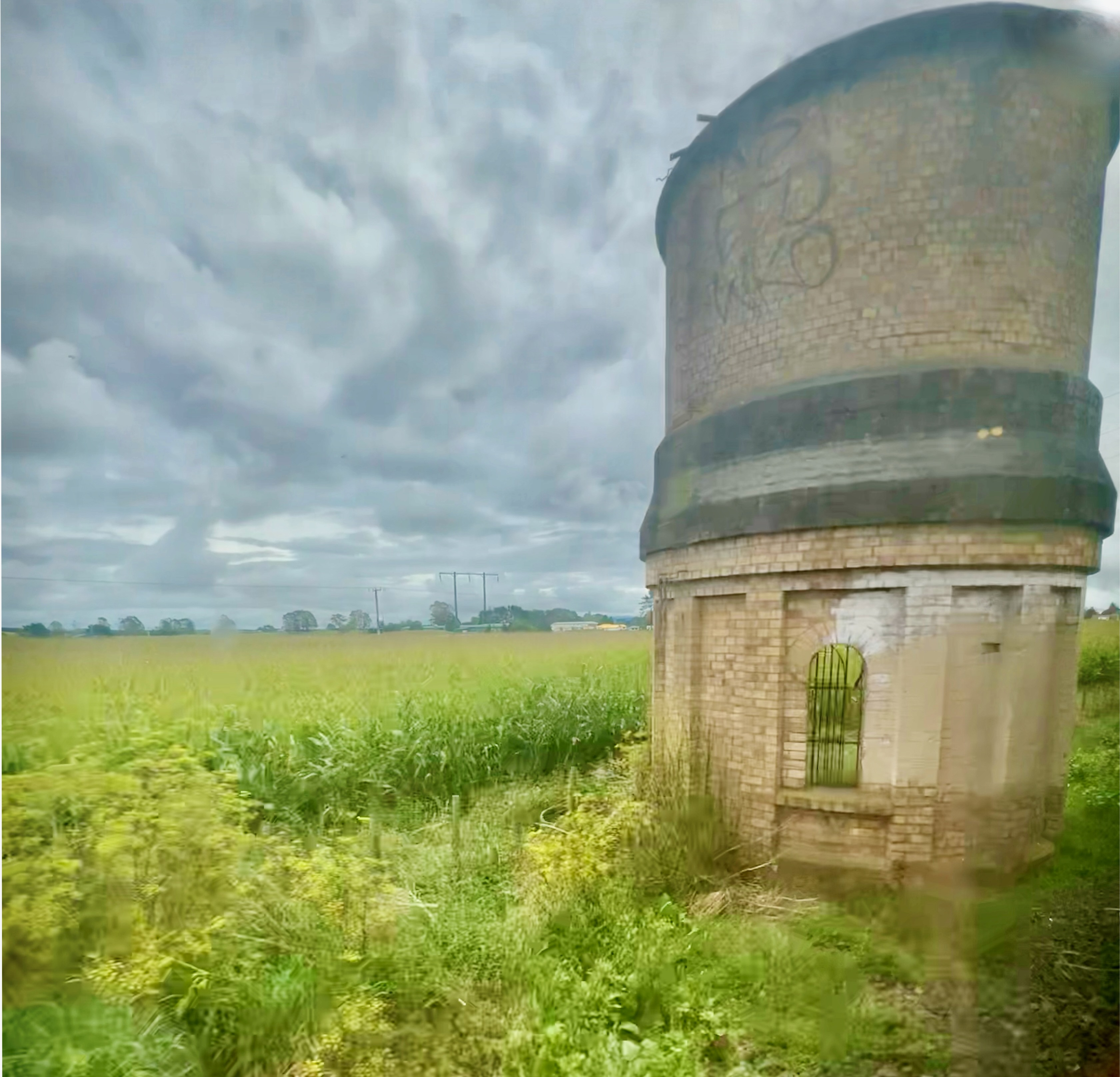
Lichfield water tower in 2026

By August 1886 there were 2 cottages, a 60 ft (18 m) by 20 ft (6.1 m) engine shed, coal shed (23ft x 15ft, 50 ton capacity), brick water tower (see below), urinals, 60 ft (18 m) by 30 ft (9.1 m) goods shed and stationmaster's house. From 1886 to 1892 there was a Post Office at the station. By 1892 traffic to and from Lichfield had fallen off rapidly, with opening of part of the Rotorua line. From 17 September 1892 Lichfield was demoted to a flag station, though it still had a 4th class station, platform, cart approach, goods shed, cattle yards and urinals in 1896.

The line was lifted in 1898, leaving only the earthworks.

=== Taupo Totara Timber Company Railway ===
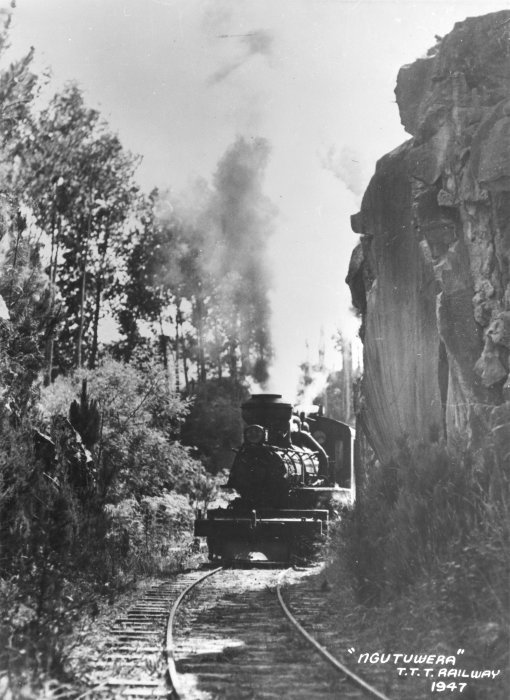
TTT at Ngutuwera (south of Lichfield) in 1947

In the early 1900s the Taupo Totara Timber Company (TTT) acquired bush blocks north and north-west of Lake Taupō and erected a sawmill at Mokai. The company built a 51 miles (82 km) railway between Mokai and Putāruru, where it connected with the NZ Government Railway.The 8 kilometres (5.0 mi) northern section between Putāruru and Lichfield was built on the formation of the former Lichfield Branch line.

The TTT railway opened in 1905 as a private carrier, carrying TTT staff and their families, guests, freight, and mail between Putāruru and Mokai. From January 29, 1908, the TTT Railway opened its freight and passenger services to the public.

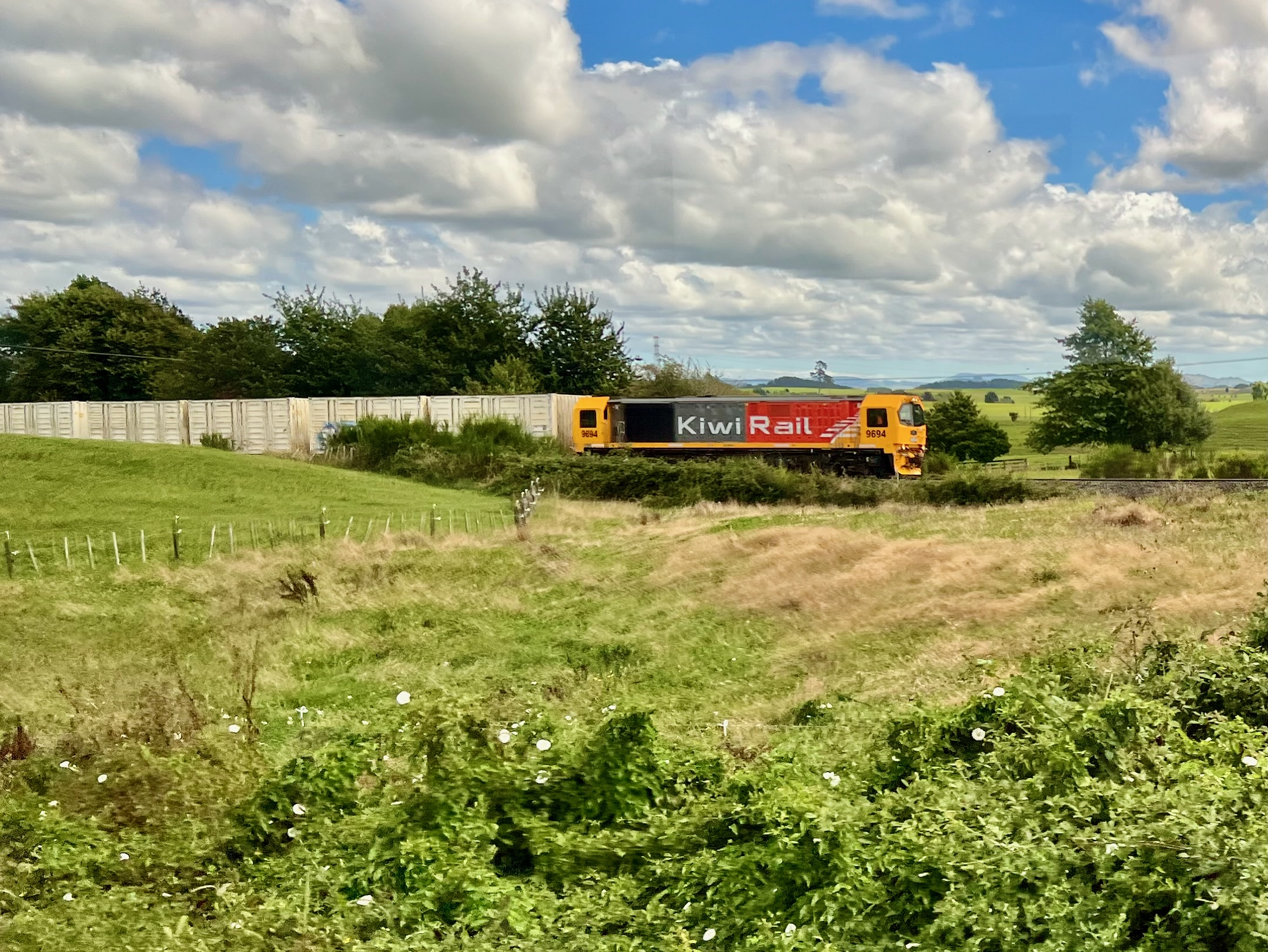
DM Class just south of Lichfield in 2024

=== New Zealand Railways Kinleith Branch ===
The NZ Government in October 1946 purchased a 19 miles (31 km) section of the TTT Railway, from Putāruru to the "19-Mile Peg", near the present-day location of the Kinleith Paper Mill south of Tokoroa. From Tuesday, 10 June 1947, the NZ Government took over the operation of this part of the TTT line.

The former TTT Railway ceased operations in 1949. Lichfield was again a terminus of the line, with a shelter shed (16ft x 10ft), a (20ft x 16ft) prefabricated army building from Claudelands, used as temporary office accommodation, and a passing loop for 64 wagons.

As part of a Government scheme for the development of the Waikato River basin and surrounding areas, a line between Putāruru and Kinleith was built to NZR standards.

The Kinleith Branch construction project was completed was completed on 6 October 1952.

== Heritage ==
=== Listed buildings ===
Lichfield has four buildings with NZHPT Category II listing -

- Listed on 5 September 1985 were -
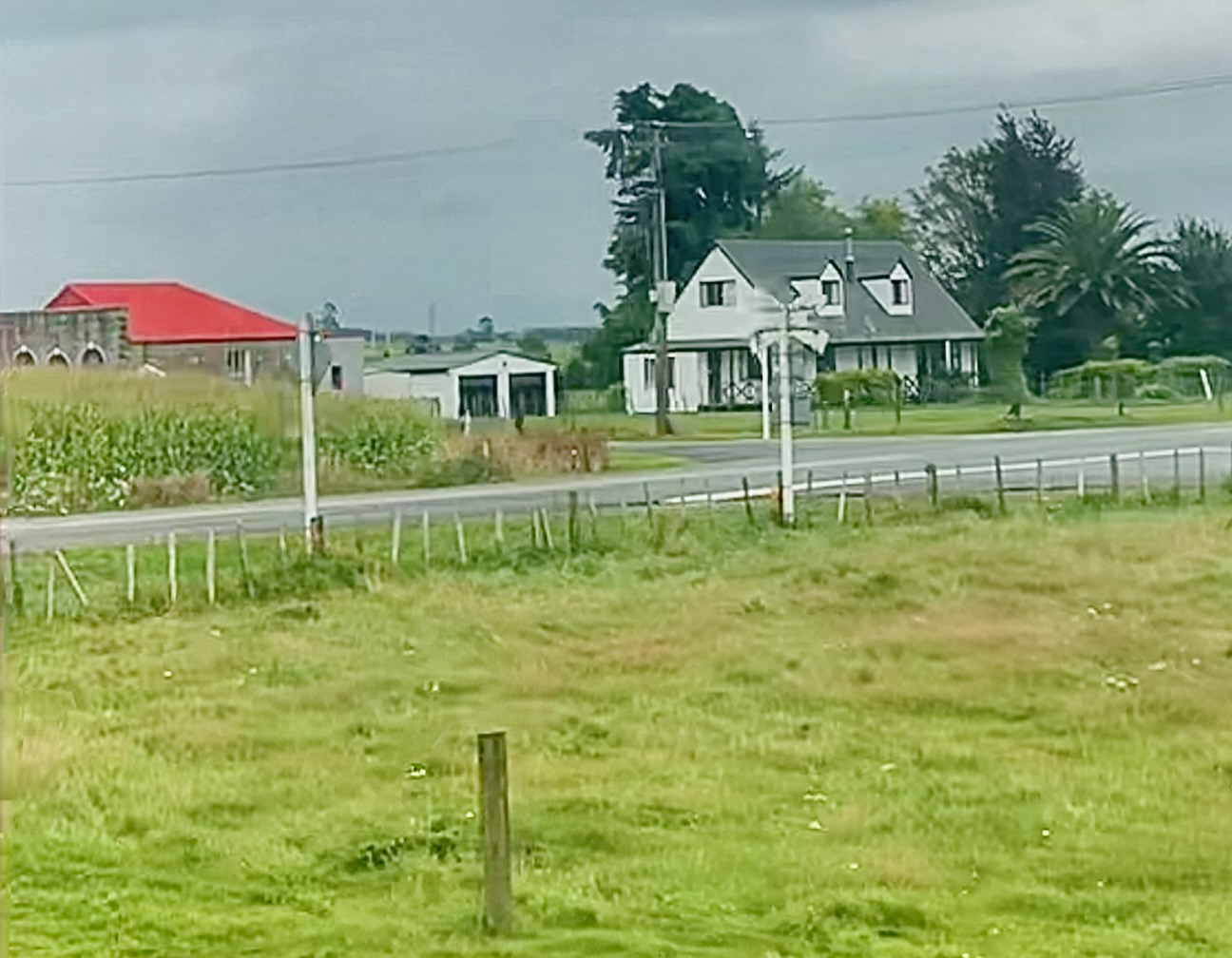
  - Former Stone Store, Lichfield
    List Number 4235 - brick water tower, close to the Stone Store, was built at the station to store up to 6,000 imp gal (27,000 L) of water and deliver it to steam locomotives. It was pumped about 90 ch (1.8 km) and raised about 100 ft (30 m) from Ngutuwera Creek, with a Blake hydraulic ram. The water also supplied the township. The pipes have been removed, but a stone shed for the intake valves remains.
  - 4236 former Skimming Factory at 831 Lichfield Road was built of totara in 1910 for the NZ Dairy Association. It ran for three seasons until home separation was adopted. It was converted to a house in 1923.
  - 4237 - former Bakehouse and dairy at 12 Kinloch Rd, built of Hinuera stone in the 1880s. It is now derelict.
- 2689 listed on 30 June 2006 - former Stone Store, probably built before 1886, was a shop in the grounds of the Lichfield Hotel. Poets Rex Fairburn and Ronald Mason lived there in 1927-28. It was built of Putāruru ignimbrite and was also used as a bank, a church and now a club room. It is at 6 Pepperill Road.
