= Waotu =

Rural settlement in the Waikato Region of New Zealand

- Interactive map of Waotu
- Coordinates: 38°08′42″S 175°41′24″E
- Country: New Zealand
- Region: Waikato
- District: South Waikato District
- Ward: Putāruru Ward
- Electorates: Taupō; Te Tai Hauāuru (Māori)

Government
  - Territorial Authority: South Waikato District Council
  - Regional council: Waikato Regional Council
  - Mayor of South Waikato: Gary Petley
  - Taupō MP: Louise Upston
  - Te Tai Hauāuru MP: Debbie Ngarewa-Packer

Area
  - Total: 66.97 km^{2} (25.86 sq mi)

Population (2023 census)
  - Total: 360
  - Density: 5.4/km^{2} (14/sq mi)
- Postcode: 3481

Waotu or Te Waotu is a rural community in the South Waikato District and Waikato region of New Zealand's North Island.

The area includes a landscape of rolling dairy farms on the site of a former ancient forest. Some native bush remains, including the first privately natural feature in New Zealand protected by covenant.

== History and culture ==
=== Early history ===
The Ngāti Kahupungapunga tribe were the first to settle the area. Ngāti Raukawa followed in the 16th century.

Pirauiti, situated at Waotu, is one of about 13 pā or fortified villages along the Waikato River. It is of significance to Ngāti Huri and is believed to date from the 14th or 15th centuries. It has been quarried and extensively damaged by J Swap Contracting.

European settlers arrived in the late 19th century, clearing most of the land for farmland by the end of the century.

A school was established at Waotu in 1886 and relocated to its current site in 1969.

=== 20th century ===
Young men from Waotu made a long journey into Hamilton in 1915 to enlist for service in World War I.

The Duxfield Reserve picnic site was donated by councillor John Duxfield in 1968.

The 16-hectare (40-acre) Jim Barnett Reserve, established in 1992, features Totara and Rimu. An ancient bush survived at this site during the Taupō Volcano eruption of 186 CE, but much of it was harvested for timber during the 1920s.

A further 50-hectare (120-acre) site was cleared for farming in the 1970s. This prompted a neighbouring couple, Gordon and Celia Stephenson, to co-found the Queen Elizabeth II National Trust in 1977. In 1979 they became the first landowners in New Zealand to covenant private land, opting to protect 4 hectares of remaining native bush on their farm.

=== 21st century ===
English student Matthew Purchase was shot during a hunting trip in Waotu in 2009. He survived with serious injuries.

Police uncovered a substantial cannabis growing operation in Waotu in January 2019.

=== Marae ===
Waotu has two tribal meeting grounds for local Ngāti Raukawa hapū: Matiti Pā and Waotu Centennial Hall is a meeting place for Ngāti Maihi, and Pikitū Marae and Huri meetinghouse are affiliated with Ngāti Huri. Pikitū Marae operates a worm farm and strict recycling programme.

In October 2020, the Government committed $109,254 from the Provincial Growth Fund to upgrade the Pikitū Marae, creating an estimated 10 jobs.

== Demographics ==
Waotu locality covers 66.97 km^{2} (25.86 sq mi) It is part of the larger Putāruru Rural statistical area.

Historical population
Year	Pop.	±% p.a.
2006	420	—
2013	327	−3.51%
2018	330	+0.18%
2023	360	+1.76%
The 2006 population is for a significantly larger area of 84.44 km^{2}. Source:

Waotu had a population of 360 in the 2023 New Zealand census, an increase of 30 people (9.1%) since the 2018 census, and an increase of 33 people (10.1%) since the 2013 census. There were 189 males and 174 females in 129 dwellings. 2.5% of people identified as LGBTIQ+. There were 102 people (28.3%) aged under 15 years, 57 (15.8%) aged 15 to 29, 156 (43.3%) aged 30 to 64, and 42 (11.7%) aged 65 or older.

People could identify as more than one ethnicity. The results were 85.8% European (Pākehā); 17.5% Māori; 1.7% Pasifika; 7.5% Asian; 0.8% Middle Eastern, Latin American and African New Zealanders (MELAA); and 1.7% other, which includes people giving their ethnicity as "New Zealander". English was spoken by 98.3%, Māori by 2.5%, and other languages by 9.2%. No language could be spoken by 3.3% (e.g. too young to talk). The percentage of people born overseas was 14.2, compared with 28.8% nationally.

Religious affiliations were 35.0% Christian, 0.8% New Age, and 1.7% other religions. People who answered that they had no religion were 54.2%, and 7.5% of people did not answer the census question.

Of those at least 15 years old, 51 (19.8%) people had a bachelor's or higher degree, 150 (58.1%) had a post-high school certificate or diploma, and 63 (24.4%) people exclusively held high school qualifications. 18 people (7.0%) earned over $100,000 compared to 12.1% nationally. The employment status of those at least 15 was 144 (55.8%) full-time, 45 (17.4%) part-time, and 6 (2.3%) unemployed.

== Education ==
Te Waotu School is a co-educational state primary school, with a roll of 122 as of October 2025. It opened in 1886 as Te Waotu Native School.

As of March 2026, Michael Thompson is the current principal

Former principal Bruce Darroch was jailed on child pornography charges in 2016. His offending related to 11 boys at the school.

The school was as at risk of overcrowding in 2017.
