= New Zealand Timber Museum =

Museum in Putāruru, New Zealand

Coordinates: 38.0695°S 175.7906°E

The New Zealand Timber Museum is located in Putāruru, New Zealand. Its main purpose is to celebrate and preserve the history of the timber industry in the South Waikato District with which it has had a connection dating back to the 1900s.

== History ==
In 1972, Frank Sneddon, a former editor of the Putaruru Press, visited a small roadside timber museum on Vancouver Island, Canada, and on his return to New Zealand, he suggested the establishment of a timber museum. Because of Putāruru's long association with the timber industry, Sneddon felt the town would be the ideal place to set up a museum. A public meeting was held on 4 May 1972 to gauge interest, and the Timber Museum Society was subsequently formed. The Putaruru Jaycees were involved in the early stages and initially planned that the museum would be sited on the Putaruru Domain, although this did not eventuate. Instead, the Society took a 10-year lease commencing in 1974 of the P.T.Y. (Putararu Timber Industries Ltd) No 2 Mill for 10c per annum. This Mill, built in the 1940s, was previously owned by Tuck and Watkins Ltd. Extremely rundown, the mill had to be virtually rebuilt by the Society for its purposes.

In 1977, the Taupo Totara Timber (TTT) Company Mill was moved on site. The restored Tuck and Watkins Mill and the TTT Order Office were opened to the public in September 1981. The Cookhouse Cafe was opened in 1982. In 2007, the Timber Museum of New Zealand Trust took over the running of the site from the Society and in July 2007 presented a three-stage development plan to the South Waikato District Council. By 2010, Stage Two of the Trust's plans had been completed. The Concatenated Order of Hoo-Hoo is a timber industry "variety club" that was founded in the US in 1892 to foster activities that would benefit the industry and humanity. Members of the International Order attended the opening of a Hoo-Hoo club room at the Museum in April 2019. The room is located in the Sycamore Conference and Function Centre, named after life member of the Putaruru Timber Museum Society, Cam Sycamore..

== Collections ==
The museum holds a large number of unique exhibits and historical archives, including

- photographic archives of local history from the early 20th century
- wood craft from local and national artists
- a number of restored historical buildings on-site
- a local geology display
- items relating to the timber industry in the local region from early European settlement
- a display of native birds by the taxidermist Jane Yandle
- a 200-year-old mataī log

== Buildings ==
The museum is the repository of several historic buildings that have been restored and which house several of the museum's collections. The interior of the buildings has been furnished with period equipment and machinery.

- Lichfield House
- Pukeahua Lookout Tower
- Mill Cottage
- TTT Company Mill
- Order Office
- Hutton House
- Putaruru Hotel
- St Michael's of All Angels Church (de-consecrated)
- Heritage Hall
- Yandle House - originally named Rossiter House - the former Yandle family homestead
- Tuck and Watkins Mill
- The White House
- Putaruru Jail
- Puketurua School
