= Yandle =

Yandle is a surname. Notable people with the surname include:

- Bruce Yandle (born 1933), American economist
- Jane Yandle (1844–1915), New Zealand taxidermist
- Keith Yandle (born 1986), American professional ice hockey player
- Staci Michelle Yandle (born 1961), American judge
- Tom Yandle (born 1935)
