= Okoroire =

Locality in New Zealand

- Interactive map of Okoroire
- Coordinates: 37.952°S 175.805°E
- Country: New Zealand
- Region: Waikato
- District: South Waikato District
- Ward: Tīrau Ward
- Electorates: Waikato; Te Tai Hauāuru (Māori)

Government
  - Territorial Authority: South Waikato District Council
  - Regional council: Waikato Regional Council
  - Mayor of South Waikato: Gary Petley
  - Waikato MP: Tim van de Molen
  - Te Tai Hauāuru MP: Debbie Ngarewa-Packer

Area
  - Total: 77.51 km^{2} (29.93 sq mi)

Population (2023 census)
  - Total: 384
  - Density: 4.95/km^{2} (12.8/sq mi)

Okoroire (Māori: Ōkoroire) is a small settlement in the South Waikato District and Waikato region of New Zealand's North Island, centred around the Okoroire Hot Springs. The place name means 'place of the koroire / toroire, an extinct species of ring-necked duck.

The hot springs consist of three naturally heated geothermal pools dug in 1880, which were extensively redeveloped in 2017 and 2018. The pools are surrounded by bush and ferns. During the late 19th century the pools were used by the sick for treatment and by Māori women to cleanse after giving birth.

Local attractions include whitewater rafting, bird-watching and fishing. Local walks include the Three Kauri Track, the Wairere Falls walk and Te Waihou walkway.

Okoroire Hotel, a historic country pub built in 1889 from ancient-timber, is located nearby near the banks of the Waihou River. It has been owned by the same family for three generations. The hotel was sold to a Chinese business in 2014. It made staff cutbacks in 2018, and the next year was forced to sell by the Overseas Investment Office after promised redevelopment had not occurred .

In 2016, members of the Chiefs rugby team were accused of exposing themselves to a stripper during an end-of-season event at the hot springs.

== Demographics ==
Okoroire locality covers 77.51 km^{2} (29.93 sq mi) It is part of the larger Tīrau statistical area.

Historical population
Year	Pop.	±% p.a.
2006	375	—
2013	288	−3.70%
2018	372	+5.25%
2023	384	+0.64%

Okoroire had a population of 384 in the 2023 New Zealand census, an increase of 12 people (3.2%) since the 2018 census, and an increase of 96 people (33.3%) since the 2013 census. There were 192 males and 189 females in 141 dwellings. 3.9% of people identified as LGBTIQ+. There were 87 people (22.7%) aged under 15 years, 57 (14.8%) aged 15 to 29, 183 (47.7%) aged 30 to 64, and 63 (16.4%) aged 65 or older.

People could identify as more than one ethnicity. The results were 92.2% European (Pākehā); 16.4% Māori; 0.8% Asian; and 0.8% Middle Eastern, Latin American and African New Zealanders (MELAA). English was spoken by 97.7%, Māori by 3.1%, and other languages by 4.7%. No language could be spoken by 1.6% (e.g. too young to talk). The percentage of people born overseas was 13.3, compared with 28.8% nationally.

Religious affiliations were 25.0% Christian, 0.8% Buddhist, 0.8% New Age, and 0.8% other religions. People who answered that they had no religion were 64.8%, and 8.6% of people did not answer the census question.

Of those at least 15 years old, 45 (15.2%) people had a bachelor's or higher degree, 186 (62.6%) had a post-high school certificate or diploma, and 75 (25.3%) people exclusively held high school qualifications. 42 people (14.1%) earned over $100,000 compared to 12.1% nationally. The employment status of those at least 15 was 186 (62.6%) full-time, 45 (15.2%) part-time, and 3 (1.0%) unemployed.

== Education ==
Kuranui Primary School is a co-educational state primary school, with a roll of 48 as of July 2026. It opened in 1914 as Waiomou School, and changed its name to Okoroire School in 1922. A merger with Tapapa School in 2003 saw the combined school called Kuranui.

== Railway station ==
Okoroire was a flag station near Rangipai School, about 3 mi (4.8 km) west of the hotel, on the Kinleith Branch, from 8 March 1886. It was 94 m (308 ft) above sea level. In 1890 it had no shelter shed, or siding, but by 1896 the station had a shelter shed, platform, cart approach and urinals. By 1911 it also had a 30 ft (9.1 m) by 20 ft (6.1 m) goods shed, sheep yards and a passing loop for 19 wagons. A caretaker was appointed in 1913 and a longer platform and an addition to the shelter shed were made in 1917. The station closed to passengers on 31 July 1962, to all traffic except stock from 18 August 1968 and to stock on Monday 1 June 1970. Only a single track and a plantation remains.

	Former adjoining stations	
Hinuera; Line open, station closed 7.32 km (4.55 mi)	Kinleith Branch	Tīrau; Line open, station closed 3.7 km (2.3 mi)
