= Arahiwi =

Rural community in Waikato Region, New Zealand

- Rural locality
- Interactive map of Arahiwi
- Coordinates: 38.104°S 176.016°E
- Country: New Zealand
- Region: Waikato
- Territorial authority: Rotorua Lakes District
- Ward: Rotorua Rural General Ward
- Community: Rotorua Rural Community
- Electorates: Rotorua; Waiariki (Māori)

Government
  - Territorial authority: Rotorua Lakes Council
  - Regional council: Waikato Regional Council
  - Mayor of Rotorua: Tania Tapsell
  - Rotorua MP: Todd McClay
  - Waiariki MP: Rawiri Waititi

Area
  - Total: 62.86 km^{2} (24.27 sq mi)

Population (June 2025)
  - Total: 150
  - Density: 2.4/km^{2} (6.2/sq mi)
- Postcode(s): 3072

Arahiwi is a rural area of New Zealand approximately 6 km west of Mamaku and 25 km from Rotorua. The Rotorua Branch is a disused railway line that ran through Arahiwi to connect Putāruru and Rotorua, before closing in 2001. Arahiwi Station opened in 1863 and closed in 1960.

== Demographics ==
Arahiwi covers 62.86 km^{2} (24.27 sq mi) and had an estimated population of 150 as of June 2025, with a population density of 2.4 people per km^{2}.

Historical population
Year	Pop.	±% p.a.
2006	150	—
2013	177	+2.39%
2018	156	−2.49%
2023	144	−1.59%

Arahiwi had a population of 144 in the 2023 New Zealand census, a decrease of 12 people (−7.7%) since the 2018 census, and a decrease of 33 people (−18.6%) since the 2013 census. There were 75 males and 72 females in 57 dwellings. 2.1% of people identified as LGBTIQ+. The median age was 32.8 years (compared with 38.1 years nationally). There were 24 people (16.7%) aged under 15 years, 36 (25.0%) aged 15 to 29, 66 (45.8%) aged 30 to 64, and 18 (12.5%) aged 65 or older.

People could identify as more than one ethnicity. The results were 87.5% European (Pākehā), 31.2% Māori, 4.2% Pasifika, 2.1% Asian, and 4.2% other, which includes people giving their ethnicity as "New Zealander". English was spoken by 100.0%, Māori by 4.2%, and other languages by 4.2%. The percentage of people born overseas was 12.5, compared with 28.8% nationally.

Religious affiliations were 25.0% Christian, and 4.2% Māori religious beliefs. People who answered that they had no religion were 58.3%, and 12.5% of people did not answer the census question.

Of those at least 15 years old, 9 (7.5%) people had a bachelor's or higher degree, 84 (70.0%) had a post-high school certificate or diploma, and 24 (20.0%) people had only high school qualifications. The median income was $43,100, compared with $41,500 nationally. 6 people (5.0%) earned over $100,000 compared to 12.1% nationally. The employment status of those at least 15 was 72 (60.0%) full-time and 21 (17.5%) part-time.
