= South Waikato District =

- Territorial authority district
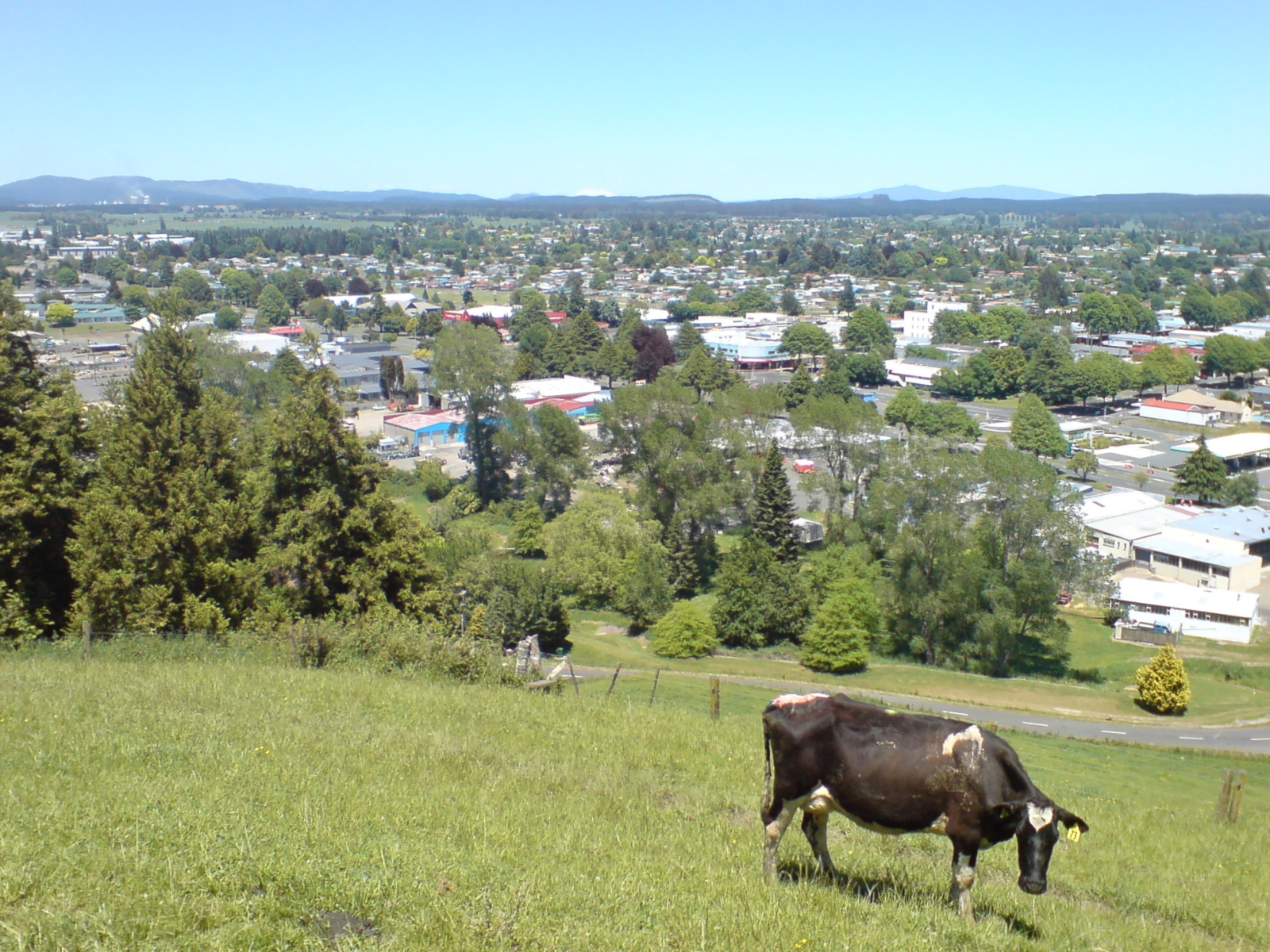
- Tokoroa

- South Waikato district within the North Island
- Coordinates: 38°09′58″S 175°51′54″E
- Country: New Zealand
- Region: Waikato
- Wards: Tirau; Putāruru; Tokoroa
- Seat: Tokoroa

Government
  - Mayor: Gary Petley
  - Territorial authority: South Waikato District Council

Area
  - Land: 1,818.88 km^{2} (702.27 sq mi)

Population (June 2025)
  - Total: 26,000
  - Density: 14/km^{2} (37/sq mi)
- Time zone: UTC+12 (NZST)
  - Summer (DST): UTC+13 (NZDT)
- Postcode(s): Map of postcodes
- Website: South Waikato District Council

South Waikato District is a local government district in the Waikato Region of the North Island of New Zealand. It is located between the cities of Hamilton to the north, Rotorua to the east, Taupō to the south and Ruapehu District to the west.

The seat of the South Waikato District Council is at Tokoroa, the biggest town. The other main towns are Putāruru, Tīrau and Arapuni.

== Populated places ==
South Waikato District consists of the following towns, localities, settlements and communities:

- Putaruru Ward:
  - Arahiwi West (Note: Populated place partly shared with Rotorua Lakes District.)
  - Arapuni
  - Hodderville
  - Lichfield
  - Ngatira
  - North Putāruru
  - Pinedale
  - Puketurua
  - Putāruru
  - Waotu
- Tirau Ward:
  - Okoroire
  - Piarere (Note: Populated place partly shared with Matamata-Piako District.)
  - Tapapa
  - Tīrau
  - Waiomou
- Tokoroa Ward:
  - Kinleith
  - North Tokoroa
  - Te Whetu
  - Tokoroa
  - Upper Ātiamuri
  - Waipapa (Note: Populated place partly shared with Ōtorohanga District.)
  - Wawa
  - Wiltsdown

== Demographics ==
The district's population in June 2025 was 26,000, of whom 55.8% lived in Tokoroa. Putaruru's population was 4,560. The region's population decreased markedly during the 1990s, dropping over 4000 since the 1991 census.

Ngāti Raukawa is the Maori tribe of the area and goes back 20–25 generations. There are 32 marae in the district, Papa te Aroha marae (Catholic Community), Aotearoa marae, Pikitu marae (Nga-Huri), Pōhara marae (Ngati Koroki), Whakaaratamaiti marae (Ngati Mahana), Mangakaretu marae (Ngati Ahuru), Ngatira marae (Ngati Ahuru), Tarukenga marae (Ngati Te-Ngakau), Ongaroto marae (Ngati Whaita), Paparamu marae (Ngati Te Apunga), Te Ruapeka marae (Ngati Tukorehe), among others

South Waikato District covers 1,818.88 km^{2} (702.27 sq mi) and had an estimated population of 26,000 as of June 2025, with a population density of 14.3 people per km^{2}.

Historical population
Year	Pop.	±% p.a.
2006	22,641	—
2013	22,071	−0.36%
2018	24,042	+1.73%
2023	25,044	+0.82%

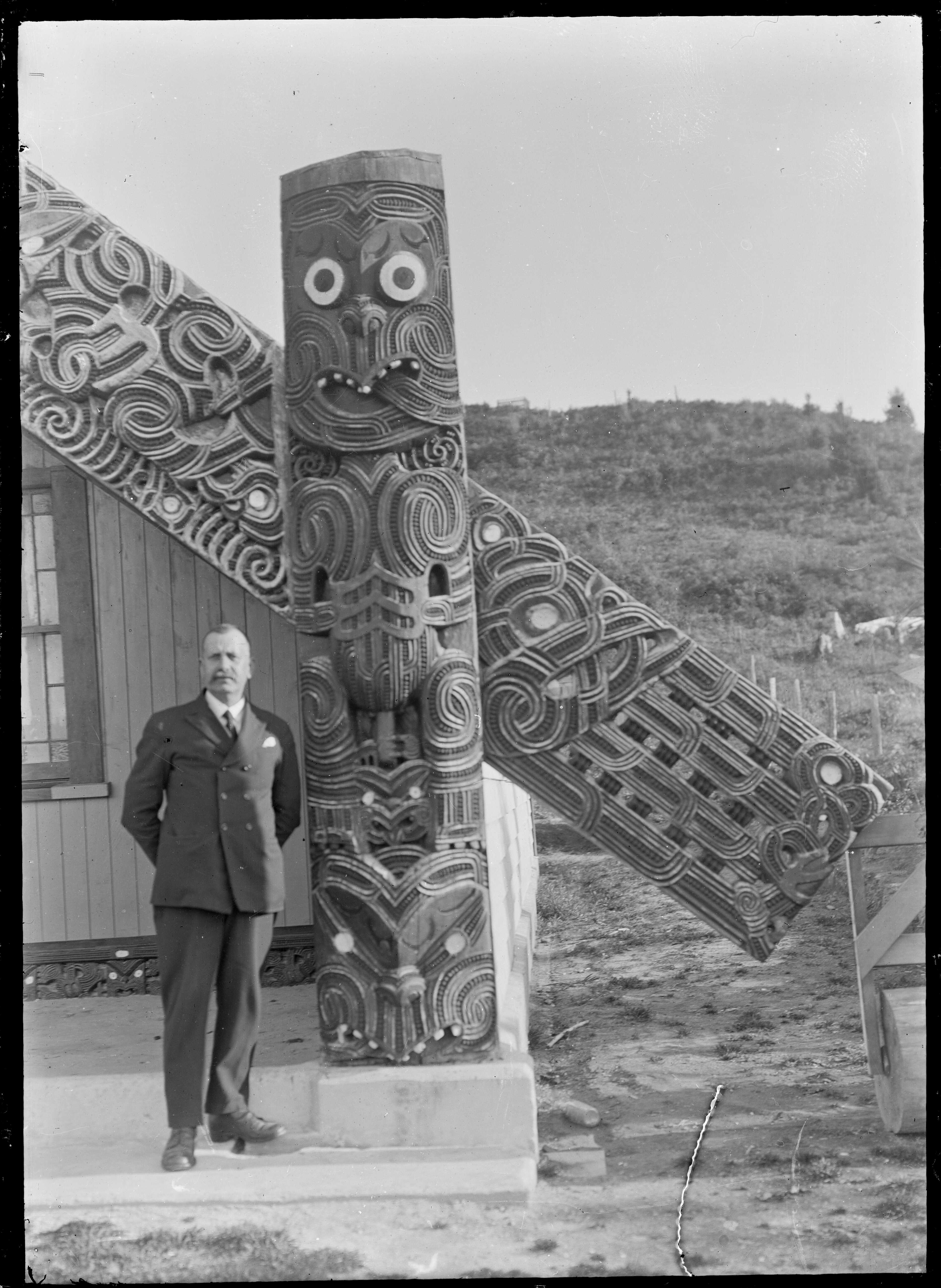
Amo of a meeting house in Ngatira

South Waikato District had a population of 25,044 in the 2023 New Zealand census, an increase of 1,002 people (4.2%) since the 2018 census, and an increase of 2,973 people (13.5%) since the 2013 census. There were 12,444 males, 12,540 females and 66 people of other genders in 9,075 dwellings. 2.2% of people identified as LGBTIQ+. The median age was 37.1 years (compared with 38.1 years nationally). There were 5,637 people (22.5%) aged under 15 years, 4,467 (17.8%) aged 15 to 29, 10,614 (42.4%) aged 30 to 64, and 4,326 (17.3%) aged 65 or older.

People could identify as more than one ethnicity. The results were 69.0% European (Pākehā); 38.3% Māori; 13.5% Pasifika; 5.0% Asian; 0.3% Middle Eastern, Latin American and African New Zealanders (MELAA); and 2.0% other, which includes people giving their ethnicity as "New Zealander". English was spoken by 96.8%, Māori language by 8.5%, Samoan by 1.0% and other languages by 6.3%. No language could be spoken by 2.3% (e.g. too young to talk). New Zealand Sign Language was known by 0.6%. The percentage of people born overseas was 13.4, compared with 28.8% nationally.

Religious affiliations were 30.1% Christian, 0.5% Hindu, 0.2% Islam, 2.6% Māori religious beliefs, 0.5% Buddhist, 0.5% New Age, 0.1% Jewish, and 1.3% other religions. People who answered that they had no religion were 55.5%, and 9.1% of people did not answer the census question.

Of those at least 15 years old, 1,665 (8.6%) people had a bachelor's or higher degree, 11,187 (57.6%) had a post-high school certificate or diploma, and 6,096 (31.4%) people exclusively held high school qualifications. The median income was $34,900, compared with $41,500 nationally. 1,347 people (6.9%) earned over $100,000 compared to 12.1% nationally. The employment status of those at least 15 was that 8,979 (46.3%) people were employed full-time, 2,334 (12.0%) were part-time, and 1,014 (5.2%) were unemployed.

Individual wards
Name	Area (km^{2})	Population	Density (per km^{2})	Dwellings	Median age	Median income
Tirau Ward	293.10	2,535	8.6	960	37.0 years	$47,100
Putāruru Ward	562.61	6,993	12.4	2,619	40.0 years	$35,300
Tokoroa Ward	963.17	15,516	16.1	5,493	36.0 years	$33,000
New Zealand					38.1 years	$41,500

== Economy ==
The district's main industries are forestry and timber production, however land previously in plantation forest is increasingly being converted to dairy production. Several hydroelectric projects are located at the district's western edge.

== Bent St. Skate Park ==
One of South Waikato District's most prominent features is the historical skate-bowl park. It was built in the 1980s, as one of the first skate parks in the country, and was recently chosen for a major refurbishment project. This community-led project is set to receive $550,000 from the South Waikato District Council in order to facilitate its upgrade. Intended upgrades include additional skating features, court area, and seating area.
