= Jane Yandle =

Furrier and taxidermist (1844–1915)

Jane Yandle (1844 – November 1915) was a professional furrier and taxidermist noted for her taxidermy of New Zealand birds, some of which are still on museum display more than 100 years after her death.

== Early life ==
Sarah Jane Yandle (née Turle) was born in 1844 in Taunton, Somerset, England. Her mother was Mary Turle (née Fox), whose occupation on the 1861 census was stated as "Naturalist", a commonly used title for a taxidermist. According to family records, Mary was also known as "the bird stuffer of Taunton", and her father, Joseph, was a watchmaker and musician. Jane's father died in 1855 when Jane was only 11. In 1863, at the age of 20, Jane married William James Yandle.

== Taxidermy business ==
The couple arrived in New Zealand in about 1866 on the SS Percy with their baby daughter, Polly. Jane Yandle gave birth to at least eight children, although not all of them survived to adulthood.

In February 1866, a case of preserved American birds was exhibited by Mrs Yandle at the opening of the Library and Meeting Rooms of the Young Men's Christian Association.

Jane presented a dabchick and two whalebirds to the Auckland Institute in 1870. Thomas Kirk paid £2 to Mrs Yandle for a tippet and muff made from kiwi feathers, on behalf of Sir James Hector who had commissioned the items as she was the only professional taxidermist and furrier in the city. Te Papa Tongarewa holds a kiwi feather muff in its collection donated by Sir James Hector's daughter in 1948. In 1877, a rare white crane which had been shot by Mr H. McMurdo was sent to Mrs Yandle for stuffing. The Daily Southern Cross newspaper of 5 May 1875 noted that Mrs Yandle's shop contained a large glass case containing around 90 American birds, stuffed and mounted. The birds had been brought back from the US by Samuel Morrin, a Canadian-born entrepreneur who had settled in New Zealand.

In the early 1870s, the Yandles were living at 18 Grey Street (now Greys Ave) in Auckland. While William worked variously as a furrier, taxidermist, dog breeder and butcher, Jane operated a furrier and taxidermist business at one time located in Queen Street, Auckland. William narrowly avoided bankruptcy on a number of occasions, and Jane, having revived the furrier and taxidermy part of the business, took over its management in 1877 in her own right. The Colonist recorded notes about a carriage wrapper made of pheasant skins by Mrs Yandle, who was described as a well-known local taxidermist.

== Later life ==
On several occasions, Jane was the victim of assault at the hands of her husband, for which he was convicted. William acknowledged in court that he had a problem controlling his alcohol intake. Jane herself was convicted and fined 20 shillings plus costs for breaching the 1881 Gaming and Lotteries Act by running an illegal lottery at the Masonic Hall, Newton, Auckland.

In 1893, Jane signed the Women's Suffrage Petition on sheet 374. Many women who advocated for suffrage around this time had experienced domestic violence often related to alcohol consumption. In 1894, Jane applied to the court for protection from her husband who was bound over to keep the peace. Two years later after a further court appearance for assaulting his wife, William was advised by the judge to leave Auckland. Jane continued running her furrier and taxidermy business for which she was acknowledged in the local press at the time. She retired from business in 1908. Her daughter, Jane Greacen (née Yandle), followed her mother into the taxidermy trade.

Jane Yandle died at her daughter's home in November 1915 aged 72. The New Zealand Timber Museum in Putāruru holds several examples of Jane Yandle's taxidermy work in its collection.
