= Tīrau =

Settlement in Waikato, New Zealand

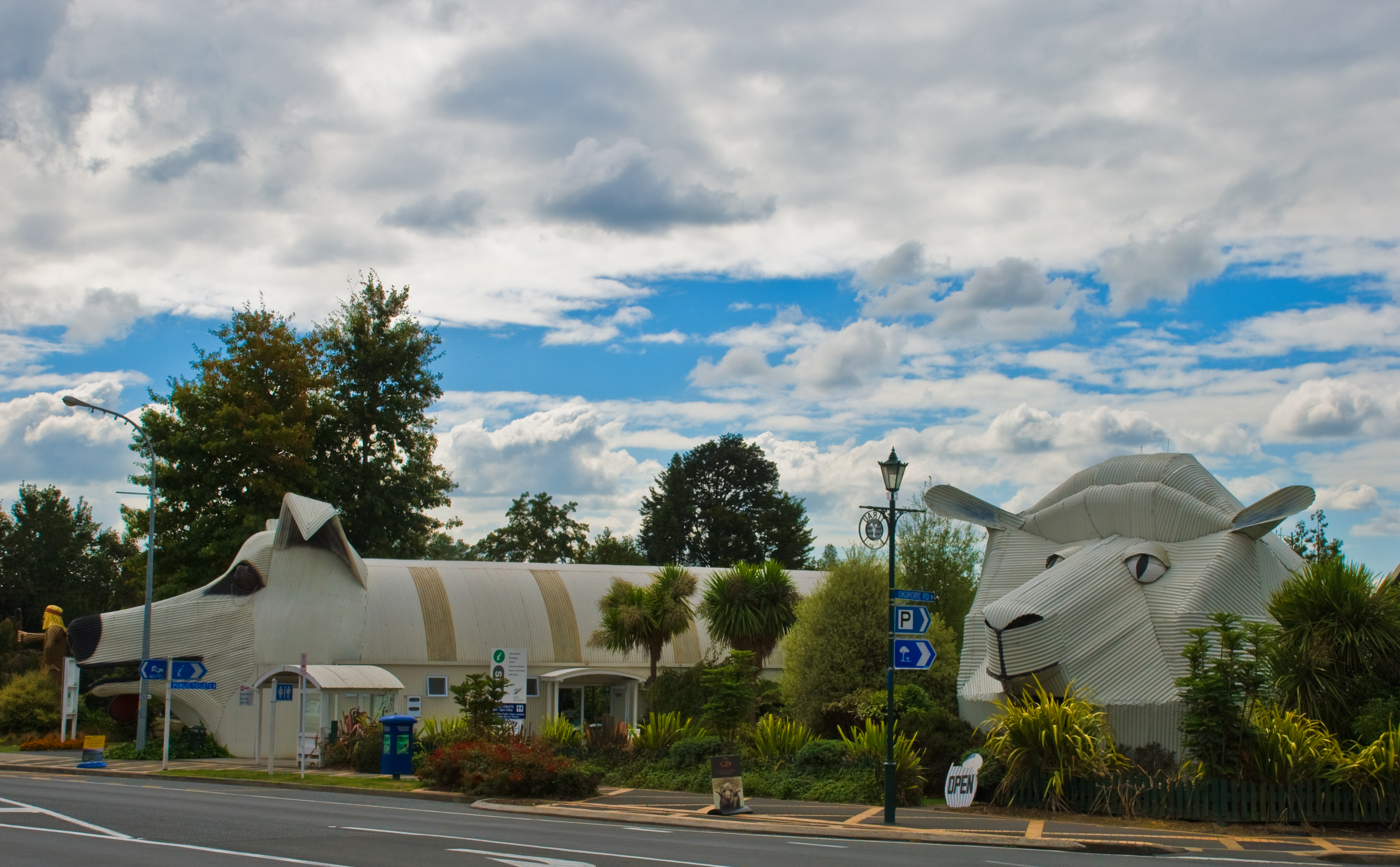
- Tīrau's corrugated iron dog and sheep buildings
- Interactive map of Tīrau
- Coordinates: 37°59′S 175°45′E
- Country: New Zealand
- Region: Waikato Region
- District: South Waikato District
- Ward: Tirau Ward
- Community: Tirau Community

Government
  - Territorial authority: South Waikato District Council
  - Regional council: Waikato Regional Council
  - Mayor of South Waikato: Gary Petley
  - Taupō MP: Louise Upston
  - Te Tai Hauāuru MP: Debbie Ngarewa-Packer

Area
  - Total: 1.69 km^{2} (0.65 sq mi)

Population (June 2025)
  - Total: 950
  - Density: 560/km^{2} (1,500/sq mi)
- Time zone: UTC+12 (NZST)
  - Summer (DST): UTC+13 (NZDT)
- Postcode: 3410
- Area code: 07

Tīrau is a small town in the South Waikato District of the North Island of New Zealand, 50 kilometres southeast of Hamilton. It had a population of 950 in June 2025. The name "Tīrau" is from the Māori language and means "many cabbage trees".

Tīrau is a node in the state highway network, sitting at the junctions of State Highway 1, State Highway 5, and State Highway 27. Tīrau is primarily a farming town but in recent years has begun to exploit the income that comes from being at a major road junction.

The small community of Okoroire (with hot springs) is located just north of Tīrau. Okoroire railway station was over 4 km (2.5 mi) to the west of the springs.

== History and culture ==
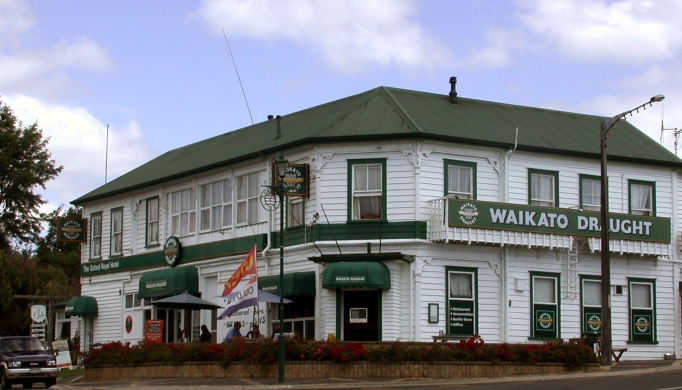
The Tīrau pub

=== European settlement ===
In the 19th century, Tīrau, then known as Oxford, was originally planned as a township. However plans were changed after the entrepreneurial Rose family bought up large areas of land in the region, with the intention of making large returns when it came of high demand. Oxford later became a rural service town.

Oxford Royal Hotel opened on 15 April 1881. A store followed in June, but by September 1881 Oxford still only had the hotel and store. 94 lots in the township, which it had been planned to sell in 1891, were offered for sale in 1882. In the 1886 census, Oxford had a population of 48 in the 1896 census, 27 in 1891 and 127 in 1911.

In 1886, James Anthony Froude visited Oxford and described it as having a single inn, with the town surrounded by desert with little vegetation growth.

=== Name ===
Oxford was a name given to the proposed township when it was sold by McLean & Co in 1881. It may have been to identify it as a sister town to Cambridge. To avoid confusion with Oxford in Canterbury, the Piako County Council asked the name to be changed. The name Tirau, suggested by two councillors, was chosen. Tirau is the name of the hill near the township. Oxford changed its name to Tirau on 23 May 1896. The name was spelt without a macron until 2019, when the New Zealand Geographic Board made Tīrau the official name.

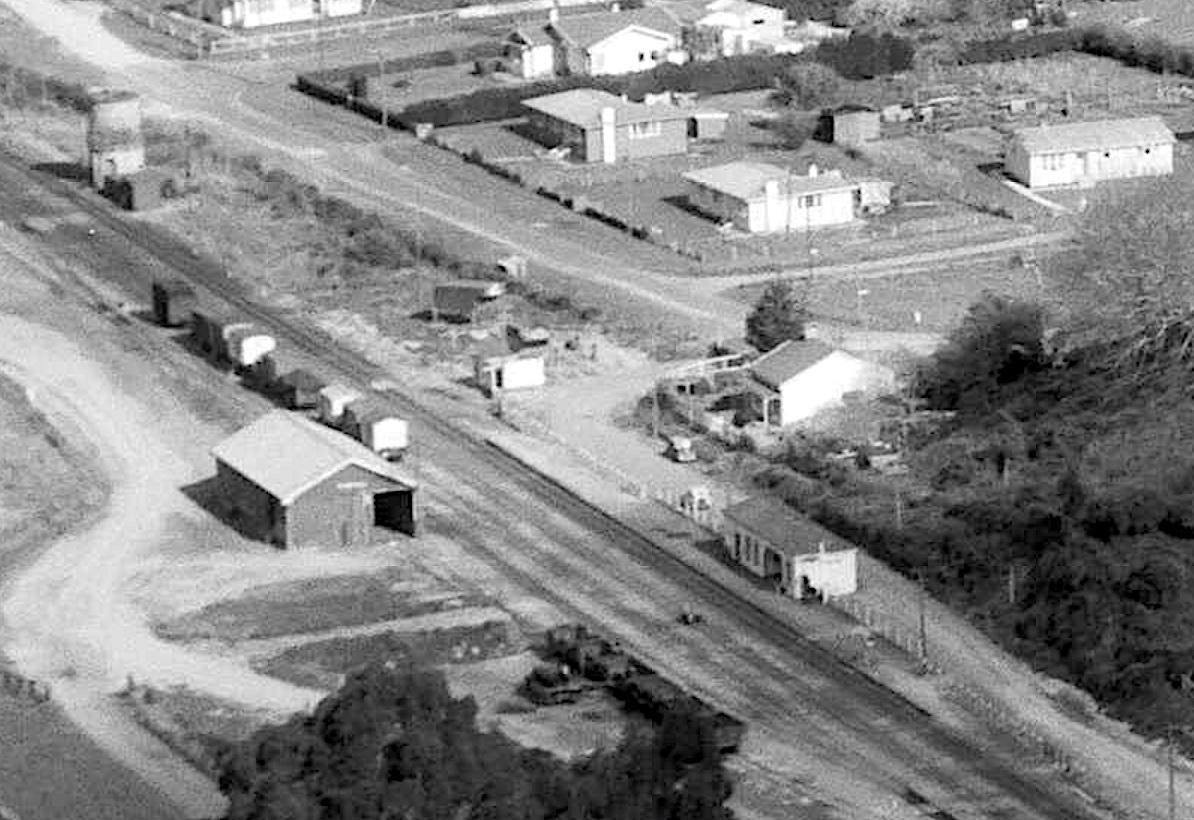
Tīrau in 1958

=== Railway station ===
Oxford railway station was at the site where the Kinleith Branch crossed Okoroire Rd The Thames Valley & Rotorua Railway Co. opened it on Monday 8 March 1886. The first train left Oxford at 7.50am and arrived in Auckland at 4.35pm, 133 mi 60 ch (215.2 km) away. Morrinsville is 30 mi 60 ch (49.5 km) away. Oxford was the terminus for a few months until 21 June 1886, when the line was extended south to Putāruru and Lichfield. On 3 days a week, from the start of the train service, a coach ran to Ohinemutu, at Rotorua.

New Zealand Railways Department took over the line on 1 April 1886. By August there was a coal shed (23ft x 15ft, 50 tons capacity), 2 cottages, 60 ft (18 m) by 30 ft (9.1 m) goods shed, turntable and a stationmaster's house. In 1895 the stationmaster was moved to Putāruru and Tirau was downgraded to a flag station. However, by 1896 Tīrau also had a 4th class station, platform, cart approach, loading bank, cattle yards, 4-stall engine shed, urinals and a passing loop for 26 wagons (extended for 70 wagons in 1964). In 1898 it was recommended that the engine shed be moved to Grahamstown, though a double shed was then built there. By 1911 there were also sheep yards.

563 passengers bought tickets in 1894, 330 in 1895 and 308 in 1896, when the main import was coal and the main exports timber and sheep. It was renamed Tirau on 8 March 1886.

In 1963 a new station in dark Huntly brick, with a storeroom, office, waiting room and platform for two railcars was built for about £4,800. Closure to passengers was on 12 November 1968 and to goods, except private siding traffic, on 29 March 1981. In 1989 the station was derelict, but still had a low level platform.

The main remnant of the station, alongside Prospect Avenue, is an NZHPT Category II listed (on 5 September 1985, List Number 4230) brick water tower. Opening of the station was delayed a week as the water supply wasn't complete. Like other Thames Valley & Rotorua stations, water was fed to a 6,000 imp gal (27 m^{3}) brick tank, supplied from the Oraka Stream, about 90 ch (1.8 km) to the south, by a Blake hydraulic ram. Similar towers remain at Lichfield and Ngātira. Fonterra still moves freight by rail from its Tīrau factory, which runs a very large anaerobic digester.

	Former adjoining stations	
Okoroire; Line open, station closed 3.7 km (2.3 mi)	Kinleith Branch	Taumangi; Line open, station closed 5.79 km (3.60 mi)

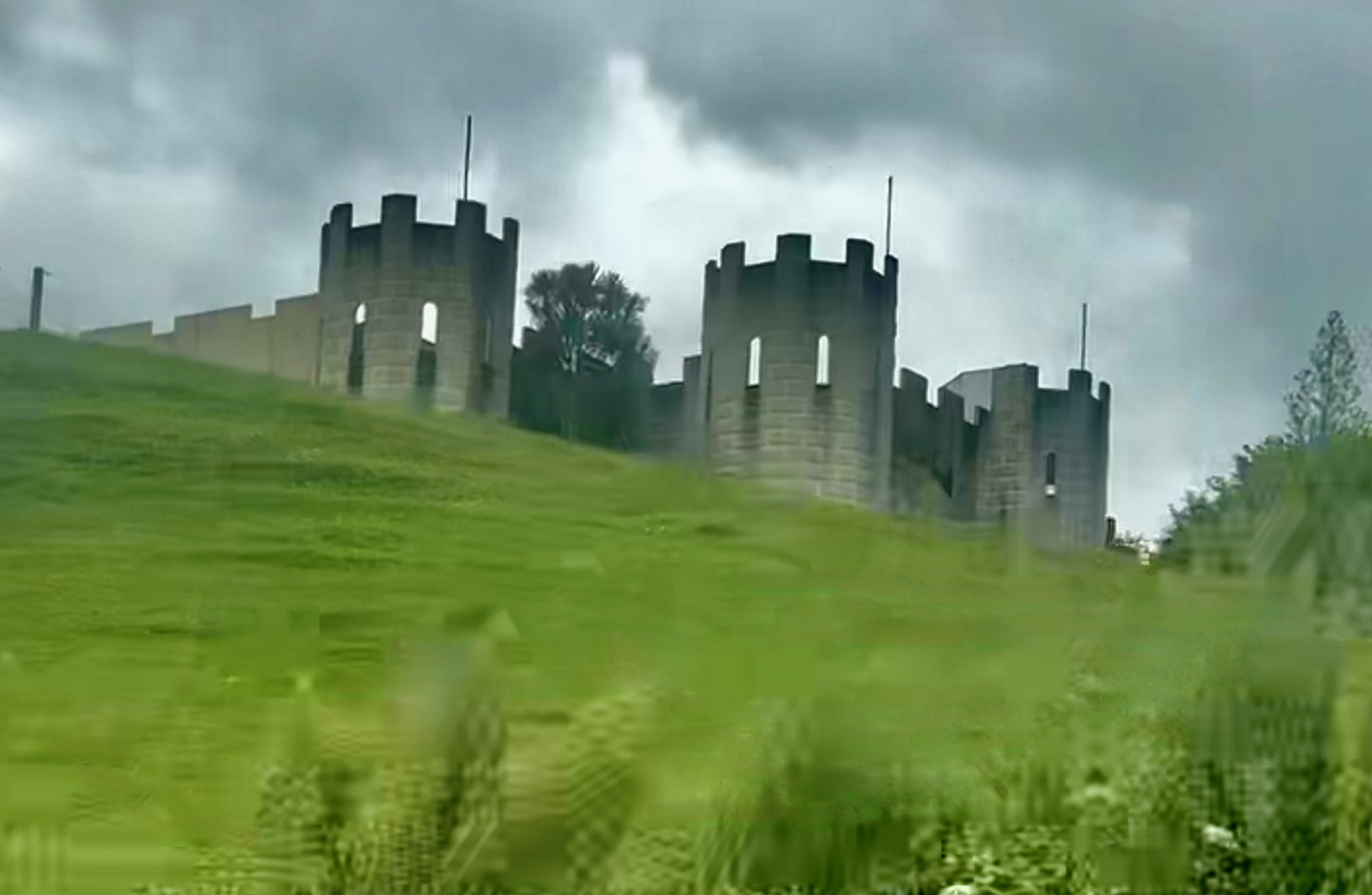
Castle Pamela built about 2000. It is visible from SH1 to the south of Tīrau

=== Recent history ===
In 1991, local business man Henry Clothier took advantage of the town's relatively cheap real estate and high traffic volume by opening an antique shop in the former Rose Bros. grocery store building. Many other businesses followed suit off the back of his success throughout the 1990s. Tīrau built a reputation as a shopping destination for antiques, collectibles and other niche items. The last antique store closed in 2017, but stores selling vintage collectables have opened.

=== Marae ===
The local Paparāmu Marae and Te Apunga meeting house are affiliated with the Ngāti Raukawa hapū of Ngāti Mōtai and Ngāti Te Apunga.

== Demographics ==
Statistics New Zealand describes Tīrau as a rural settlement, which covers 1.69 km^{2} (0.65 sq mi). It had an estimated population of 950 as of June 2025, with a population density of 562 people per km^{2}. The settlement is part of the larger Tīrau statistical area.

Historical population for the settlement
Year	Pop.	±% p.a.
2006	741	—
2013	702	−0.77%
2018	804	+2.75%
2023	885	+1.94%

Tīrau had a population of 885 in the 2023 New Zealand census, an increase of 81 people (10.1%) since the 2018 census, and an increase of 183 people (26.1%) since the 2013 census. There were 435 males, 444 females, and 3 people of other genders in 354 dwellings. 2.4% of people identified as LGBTIQ+. The median age was 38.4 years (compared with 38.1 years nationally). There were 195 people (22.0%) aged under 15 years, 141 (15.9%) aged 15 to 29, 405 (45.8%) aged 30 to 64, and 150 (16.9%) aged 65 or older.

People could identify as more than one ethnicity. The results were 82.7% European (Pākehā); 28.1% Māori; 2.4% Pasifika; 3.1% Asian; 0.3% Middle Eastern, Latin American and African New Zealanders (MELAA); and 2.0% other, which includes people giving their ethnicity as "New Zealander". English was spoken by 97.6%, Māori by 6.1%, Samoan by 1.0%, and other languages by 3.4%. No language could be spoken by 2.4% (e.g. too young to talk). New Zealand Sign Language was known by 0.7%. The percentage of people born overseas was 11.2, compared with 28.8% nationally.

Religious affiliations were 22.0% Christian, 0.7% Māori religious beliefs, 1.0% New Age, and 1.7% other religions. People who answered that they had no religion were 63.1%, and 10.8% of people did not answer the census question.

Of those at least 15 years old, 84 (12.2%) people had a bachelor's or higher degree, 405 (58.7%) had a post-high school certificate or diploma, and 207 (30.0%) people exclusively held high school qualifications. The median income was $40,700, compared with $41,500 nationally. 51 people (7.4%) earned over $100,000 compared to 12.1% nationally. The employment status of those at least 15 was 357 (51.7%) full-time, 99 (14.3%) part-time, and 15 (2.2%) unemployed.

=== Tīrau statistical area ===
Tīrau statistical area covers 293.10 km^{2} (113.17 sq mi) and had an estimated population of 2,660 as of June 2025, with a population density of 9.1 people per km^{2}.

Historical population for the statistical area
Year	Pop.	±% p.a.
2006	2,196	—
2013	2,106	−0.60%
2018	2,334	+2.08%
2023	2,535	+1.67%

Tīrau statistical area had a population of 2,535 in the 2023 New Zealand census, an increase of 201 people (8.6%) since the 2018 census, and an increase of 429 people (20.4%) since the 2013 census. There were 1,266 males, 1,260 females, and 9 people of other genders in 960 dwellings. 2.4% of people identified as LGBTIQ+. The median age was 37.0 years (compared with 38.1 years nationally). There were 591 people (23.3%) aged under 15 years, 390 (15.4%) aged 15 to 29, 1,173 (46.3%) aged 30 to 64, and 381 (15.0%) aged 65 or older.

People could identify as more than one ethnicity. The results were 86.3% European (Pākehā); 21.4% Māori; 2.1% Pasifika; 3.8% Asian; 0.4% Middle Eastern, Latin American and African New Zealanders (MELAA); and 2.0% other, which includes people giving their ethnicity as "New Zealander". English was spoken by 96.9%, Māori by 4.1%, Samoan by 0.6%, and other languages by 5.2%. No language could be spoken by 2.7% (e.g. too young to talk). New Zealand Sign Language was known by 0.7%. The percentage of people born overseas was 13.1, compared with 28.8% nationally.

Religious affiliations were 27.3% Christian, 0.2% Hindu, 0.2% Islam, 0.5% Māori religious beliefs, 0.2% Buddhist, 0.6% New Age, and 1.7% other religions. People who answered that they had no religion were 59.5%, and 9.7% of people did not answer the census question.

Of those at least 15 years old, 315 (16.2%) people had a bachelor's or higher degree, 1,137 (58.5%) had a post-high school certificate or diploma, and 486 (25.0%) people exclusively held high school qualifications. The median income was $47,100, compared with $41,500 nationally. 243 people (12.5%) earned over $100,000 compared to 12.1% nationally. The employment status of those at least 15 was 1,098 (56.5%) full-time, 309 (15.9%) part-time, and 48 (2.5%) unemployed.

== Tourism ==
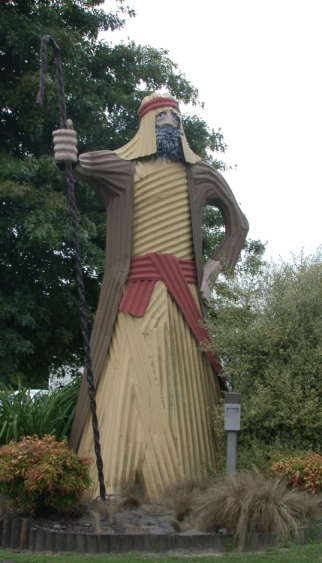
The Tīrau 'good shepherd', outside the local church

The town is now a well known tourist stop-off, and is characterised by many art works created out of corrugated iron. The church and many of the shops feature corrugated iron sculptures by local artist Steven Clothier and two large buildings are completely made from this material; the information centre, which is shaped like a giant dog, and the neighbouring ewe and ram building – earning Tīrau the title of "Corrugated Capital of the World".

== Dairy factory ==
The Tīrau dairy factory was opened in 1938 by the New Zealand Co-operative Dairy Company, as the largest butter factory in the country. It was upgraded in 1971 to produce 15,000 tons a year. A large plant was built next to it in 1982, for casein, lactalbumin and ethanol. In 2022 a whey concentrator was added, so that lactose production could replace ethanol. The factory is New Zealand's only producer of lactalbumin, a key ingredient in the production of sports supplements.

== Government ==
Tīrau is governed locally by the South Waikato District Council. Nationally, Tīrau is part of the Taupō general electorate and the Te Tai Hauāuru Māori electorate.

== Transport ==
The Royal Hotel ran coaches twice a week from Cambridge from 1882. By 1924 AARD was running a regular bus between Hamilton and Rotorua, via Tīrau. In 1938 a subway was built beneath the railway to take SH1 under a bridge, rather than over a level crossing and in 1939 the single lane bridge over the nearby Ōraka Stream was widened. In 2018 47% of those in the Tīrau statistical area said they drove to work, 30% worked from home, 4% walked and 0.5% cycled. An Urban Connector bus runs twice a day between Tokoroa and Tīrau, via Putāruru and Lichfield. Tīrau is also served by InterCity buses to Auckland, Gisborne, Hastings and Wellington.

== Education ==
Tīrau Primary School is the sole school in Tīrau. It is a contributing primary school (Years 1–6) and has 127 students as of July 2026. The school opened in 1888.

The nearest intermediate and secondary school is Putaruru College, 8 kilometres (5 mi) south of Tīrau, in Putāruru.
