= Putāruru =

Town in Waikato, New Zealand

- Town
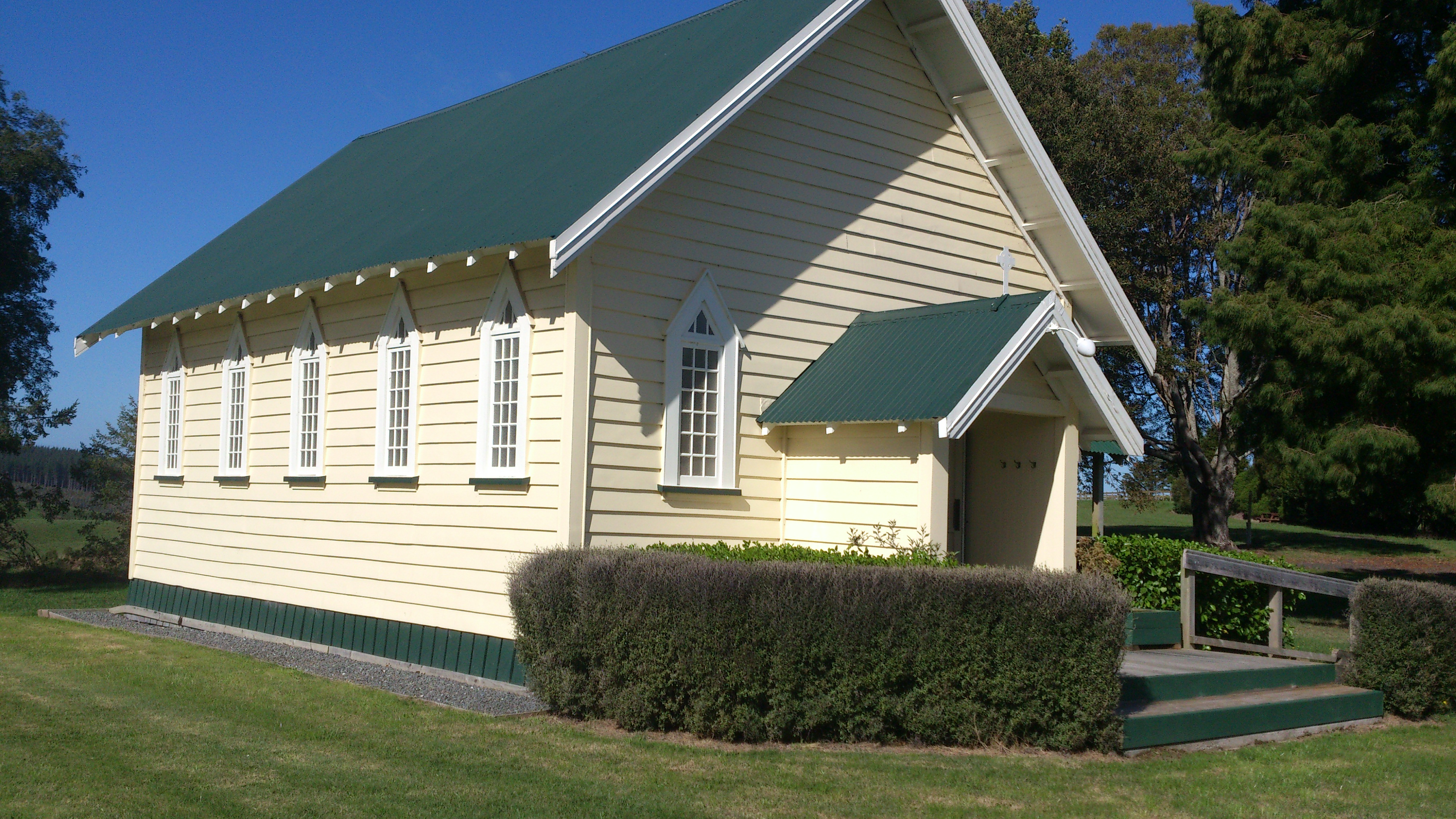
- Church at the Timber Museum
- Interactive map of Putāruru
- Coordinates: 38.050°S 175.780°E
- Country: New Zealand
- Region: Waikato Region
- District: South Waikato District
- Ward: Putāruru Ward
- Electorates: Taupō; Te Tai Hauāuru (Māori)

Government
  - Territorial Authority: South Waikato District Council
  - Regional council: Waikato Regional Council
  - Mayor of South Waikato: Gary Petley
  - Taupō MP: Louise Upston
  - Te Tai Hauāuru MP: Debbie Ngarewa-Packer

Area
  - Total: 6.81 km^{2} (2.63 sq mi)

Population (June 2025)
  - Total: 4,560
  - Density: 670/km^{2} (1,730/sq mi)
- Time zone: UTC+12 (NZST)
  - Summer (DST): UTC+13 (NZDT)
- Postcode(s): 3411

Putāruru is a small town in the South Waikato District and the Waikato region of New Zealand's North Island. It lies on the western side of the Mamaku Ranges and in the upper basin of the Waihou River. It is on the Oraka Stream 65 kilometres south-east of Hamilton. State Highway 1 and the Kinleith Branch railway run through the town.

== Name ==
The town gets its name from a historic event which occurred nearby. Korekore a granddaughter of Raukawa, the founder of the Ngāti Raukawa iwi, was murdered by her husband Parahore. Her servant Ruru witnessed her murder and escaped into the forest where he hid and waited for Parahore and his men to give up their pursuit of him. The place where he exited the forest was named "Te Puta a Ruru" or "the exit of Ruru". This was eventually shorted to Putāruru.

== History and culture ==
=== Pre-colonial history ===
There were several Māori settlements in the Putāruru district in pre-colonial times. Ngāti Raukawa is the main tribe or iwi in the area and Ngāti Mahana is the hapū (subtribe) within Putāruru. During Te Rauparaha's migration to the Cook Strait area in the 1820s, many Ngāti Raukawa people moved from these settlements to Rangitikei and Manawatu localities, and others followed after the Siege of Ōrākau in 1864. Te Kooti and his followers were pursued through the district early in 1870 by a force under Lt-Col. Thomas McDonnell.

=== European settlement ===
The Patetere Block, containing the future town site of Putāruru, was acquired from the Māori in the 1860s. In the early 1880s large areas in the Putāruru district came into the possession of the Patetere Land Company, and from 1883 much of this land passed into the hands of the Thames Valley Land Company. Roadmaking commenced in the late 1880s, but the railway, begun by the Thames Valley and Rotorua Railway Co., was the most important factor in the progress of settlement in the area.

The first settler in the district bought his section in 1892.

In the 1880s Putāruru consisted of little more than a hotel and a blacksmith shop.

Exotic afforestation was begun in the district some time after 1910 by a land and timber company with an outlet to the Hamilton-Rotorua railway near Pinedale. Commercial tree planting with Pinus radiata took place between 1924 and 1928 on the Pinedale Block. Milling began in 1940–41 and by 1951 the area had been cut out and replanted. Larger areas further south were planted in 1924 for future milling and to provide the raw material for pulp and paper manufacture. The town of Putāruru was surveyed in 1905 and on 18 December an area of 50,987 acres (206 km^{2}), which had been acquired from the Thames Valley Land Co. by the Crown and included town allotments in Putāruru and Lichfield, was opened by ballot.

The history of the local timber industry is preserved in the New Zealand Timber Museum.

Much of the land in the Putāruru district suffered from a cobalt deficiency, which made farming practically impossible, but since 1935 measures have been taken to restore fertility, and farming has expanded.

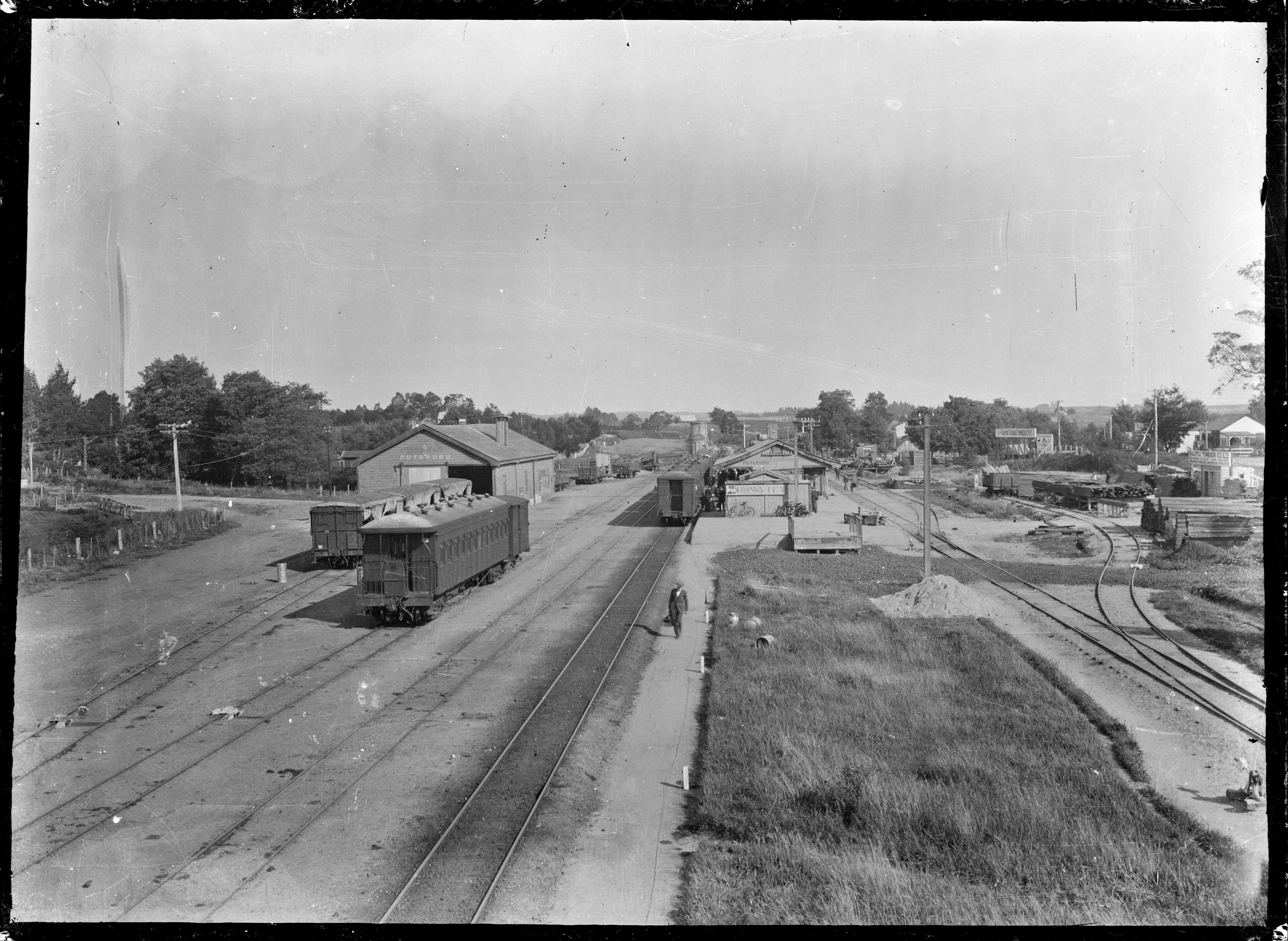
Putāruru Railway Station and railway yards, 1923.

=== Marae ===
The Putāruru area has two marae, affiliated with the hapū of Ngāti Raukawa:

- Mangakāretu Marae and Ngā Hau e Maha meeting house are affiliated with Ngāti Ahuru
- Whakaaratamaiti Marae and Korōria meeting house are affiliated with Ngāti Ahuru and Ngāti Mahana

In October 2020, the Government committed $1,259,392 from the Provincial Growth Fund to upgrade Mangakāretu Marae, Whakaaratamaiti Marae and 6 other Ngāti Raukawa marae, creating 18 jobs.

=== Bent St. Skate Park ===
One of Putaruru’s most prominent features is it historical skate-bowl park. It was built in the 1980s, as one of the first skate parks in the country, and was recently chosen for a major refurbishment project. This community-led project is set to receive $550,000 from the South Waikato District Council in order to facilitate its upgrade. Intended upgrades include additional skating features, court area, and seating area.

== Governance ==
=== Local government ===
Putāruru was originally a part of Piako County, but following the passing of the Matamata County Act 1908, the town became part of the new Matamata County, formed from the southern portion of Piako and parts of West Taupo County. Growth of the town over the ensuing years led to calls for Putāruru to have its own town board, and this came to fruition in 1926, when the population of the town was 670. On 1 July 1947, Putāruru gained independence from Matamata County with the formation of the Putaruru Borough, with its own mayor and borough council. As part of the 1989 local government reforms, Putaruru Borough merged with Tokoroa Borough and parts of Matamata County, to form the South Waikato District, with its seat in Tokoroa and a service centre in Putāruru.

During its 42-year existence, Putaruru Borough had six mayors. The following is a complete list:

	Mayor	Portrait	Term of office	Notes
1	Harry Martin		1947–1950	
2	Archie Mason		1950–1953	
3	Trevor Pearce		1953–1959	
4	Charlie Robinson		1959–1965	
5	Wally Grey		1965–1974	
6	Jim Howland		1974–1989	Appointed MBE in 1992

=== Central government ===
Putāruru is part of the Taupō electorate, which has been represented in Parliament by Louise Upston since 2008.

== Demographics ==
Stats NZ describes Putāruru as a small urban area, which covers 6.81 km^{2} (2.63 sq mi). It had an estimated population of 4,560 as of June 2025, with a population density of 670 people per km^{2}.

Historical population
Year	Pop.	±% p.a.
1996	4,047	—
2001	3,783	−1.34%
2006	3,930	+0.77%
2013	3,945	+0.05%
2018	4,314	+1.80%
2023	4,455	+0.65%
The population figures before 2006 may be for slightly different boundaries. Source:

Putāruru had a population of 4,455 in the 2023 New Zealand census, an increase of 141 people (3.3%) since the 2018 census, and an increase of 510 people (12.9%) since the 2013 census. There were 2,151 males, 2,295 females, and 9 people of other genders in 1,692 dwellings. 2.2% of people identified as LGBTIQ+. The median age was 43.1 years (compared with 38.1 years nationally). There were 888 people (19.9%) aged under 15 years, 729 (16.4%) aged 15 to 29, 1,764 (39.6%) aged 30 to 64, and 1,074 (24.1%) aged 65 or older.

People could identify as more than one ethnicity. The results were 74.0% European (Pākehā); 37.2% Māori; 3.8% Pasifika; 4.8% Asian; 0.3% Middle Eastern, Latin American and African New Zealanders (MELAA); and 2.0% other, which includes people giving their ethnicity as "New Zealander". English was spoken by 97.5%, Māori by 9.4%, Samoan by 0.1%, and other languages by 5.2%. No language could be spoken by 1.8% (e.g. too young to talk). New Zealand Sign Language was known by 0.7%. The percentage of people born overseas was 13.1, compared with 28.8% nationally.

Religious affiliations were 29.8% Christian, 0.8% Hindu, 0.3% Islam, 3.0% Māori religious beliefs, 0.8% Buddhist, 0.5% New Age, 0.1% Jewish, and 0.9% other religions. People who answered that they had no religion were 54.7%, and 9.4% of people did not answer the census question.

Of those at least 15 years old, 342 (9.6%) people had a bachelor's or higher degree, 1,941 (54.4%) had a post-high school certificate or diploma, and 1,284 (36.0%) people exclusively held high school qualifications. The median income was $30,100, compared with $41,500 nationally. 156 people (4.4%) earned over $100,000 compared to 12.1% nationally. The employment status of those at least 15 was 1,416 (39.7%) full-time, 432 (12.1%) part-time, and 156 (4.4%) unemployed.

=== Rural surrounds ===
Putāruru Rural statistical area, which includes Arapuni, Waotu and Lichfield, covers 555.80 km^{2} (214.60 sq mi) and had an estimated population of 2,660 as of June 2025, with a population density of 4.8 people per km^{2}.

Historical populations for the rural surrounds
Year	Pop.	±% p.a.
2006	2,238	—
2013	2,223	−0.10%
2018	2,373	+1.31%
2023	2,538	+1.35%

Putāruru Rural had a population of 2,538 in the 2023 New Zealand census, an increase of 165 people (7.0%) since the 2018 census, and an increase of 315 people (14.2%) since the 2013 census. There were 1,287 males, 1,242 females, and 6 people of other genders in 930 dwellings. 1.9% of people identified as LGBTIQ+. The median age was 36.6 years (compared with 38.1 years nationally). There were 603 people (23.8%) aged under 15 years, 399 (15.7%) aged 15 to 29, 1,176 (46.3%) aged 30 to 64, and 363 (14.3%) aged 65 or older.

People could identify as more than one ethnicity. The results were 86.6% European (Pākehā); 19.7% Māori; 2.2% Pasifika; 4.3% Asian; 0.6% Middle Eastern, Latin American and African New Zealanders (MELAA); and 2.4% other, which includes people giving their ethnicity as "New Zealander". English was spoken by 96.8%, Māori by 4.6%, Samoan by 0.1%, and other languages by 6.7%. No language could be spoken by 2.4% (e.g. too young to talk). New Zealand Sign Language was known by 0.6%. The percentage of people born overseas was 13.4, compared with 28.8% nationally.

Religious affiliations were 30.4% Christian, 0.5% Hindu, 0.8% Māori religious beliefs, 0.2% Buddhist, 0.4% New Age, 0.1% Jewish, and 1.2% other religions. People who answered that they had no religion were 56.3%, and 10.4% of people did not answer the census question.

Of those at least 15 years old, 318 (16.4%) people had a bachelor's or higher degree, 1,176 (60.8%) had a post-high school certificate or diploma, and 444 (22.9%) people exclusively held high school qualifications. The median income was $47,700, compared with $41,500 nationally. 198 people (10.2%) earned over $100,000 compared to 12.1% nationally. The employment status of those at least 15 was 1,125 (58.1%) full-time, 267 (13.8%) part-time, and 33 (1.7%) unemployed.

== Economy ==
Putāruru's economy is based on farming, forestry and timber production.

The nearby Blue Spring is the current source of about 70% of New Zealand's bottled water. Much of the town's water comes from the spring, which is on the Waihou River to the north east.

== Railways ==
=== New Zealand Railways Rotorua Branch ===
Construction of the Rotorua Branch line was started by the New Zealand Thames Valley Land Company (NZTVLC). The line reached Oxford (Tīrau) on 8 March 1886 and Putāruru and Lichfield, 8.22 km (5.11 mi) further south-east, on Monday 21 June 1886.

The New Zealand Railways Department (NZR) took over the line on 1 April 1886.

The 11.8 km (7.3 mi) Putāruru-Ngātira section of the line to Rotorua was built by contractor Daniel Fallon, and work was underway by April 1887.

The branch opened on 8 December 1894. Putāruru was then served by the Rotorua Express.

=== Taupo Totara Timber Company Railway ===
In the early 1900s the Taupo Totara Timber Company (TTT) acquired bush blocks north and north-west of Lake Taupō and erected a sawmill at Mokai. The company built a 51 miles (82 km) railway between Mokai and Putāruru, where it connected with the NZ Government Railway. The TTT railway opened in 1905 as a private carrier, carrying TTT staff and their families, guests, freight, and mail between Putāruru and Mokai.

From January 29, 1908, the TTT Railway opened its freight and passenger services to the public.

=== New Zealand Railways Kinleith Branch ===
The NZ Government in October 1946 purchased a 19 miles (31 km) section of the TTT Railway, from Putāruru to the "19-Mile Peg", near the present-day location of the Kinleith Paper Mill south of Tokoroa. From Tuesday, 10 June 1947, the NZ Government took over the operation of this part of the TTT line.

The former TTT Railway ceased operations in 1949. As part of a Government scheme for the development of the Waikato River basin and surrounding areas, a line between Putāruru and Kinleith, built to NZR standards, was completed on 6 October 1952.

=== Putāruru Railway Station ===
Putāruru railway station was near the junction of Arapuni and Princes Streets, 0.61 km (0.38 mi) north of the junction of the Kinleith Branch with the former Rotorua Branch.

In August 1886 the station had a 14 ft (4.3 m) by 8 ft (2.4 m) shelter shed, three cottages, a 30 ft (9.1 m) by 40 ft (12 m) goods shed and an incomplete station master's house.

Putāruru was still a flag station in 1890, when the daily train took about 3 hours to cover the 88.03 km (54.70 mi) between Putāruru and Frankton (Hamilton).

About the time of the Rotorua Branch's completion, the station was rebuilt and extended to about 64 ft (20 m) long. It had a refreshment room and a bookstall and, from 1907, the railway yard had a 50 ft (15 m) turntable and handled much livestock, as well as timber. The refreshment room, run by the hotel until 1919, burnt down in 1925 and was replaced by a room to the south of the main building, which closed in 1968.

Putāruru railway station closed to passengers on 12 November 1968 and freight on 10 December 2002, though it was served by the Geyserland Express from 1991 to 2001. The station was demolished during March and April 2013. Only a signals equipment shelter and a passing loop now remain on the station site.

	Former adjoining stations	
Terminus at Putāruru	Rotorua Branch	Pinedale; Line closed, station closed 3.95 km (2.45 mi)
Taumangi; Line open, station closed 3.7 km (2.3 mi)	Kinleith Branch	Lichfield; Line open, station closed 7.83 km (4.87 mi)

=== Taumangi railway station ===
Taumangi (or Taumanga) was a flag station 3.7 km (2.3 mi) north of Putāruru and 5.79 km (3.60 mi) south of Tīrau. It was just south of Taumangi Road. In 1923 Taumangi Road was diverted north, when a bridge replaced the former level crossing.

Taumangi opened on the same day as Putāruru, 8 March 1886. By August 1886 there was a 14 ft (4.3 m) by 8 ft (2.4 m) shelter shed and two cottages and by 1896 there was also a platform and cart approach. In 1925 it was noted that inwards traffic was of timber, shingle, gravel, coal, 13 loads of manure, a wagon of lime, hardware and small goods. The public siding closed on 8 September 1941, as it was in a poor condition, but the station remained open for passengers until 22 November 1948, and for parcels, and roadside traffic until 30 July 1951. There is now only a single line through the station site.

== Climate ==
Climate data for Putāruru (1951–1980)
Month	Jan	Feb	Mar	Apr	May	Jun	Jul	Aug	Sep	Oct	Nov	Dec	Year
Mean daily maximum °C (°F)	22.9 (73.2)	23.6 (74.5)	21.8 (71.2)	18.8 (65.8)	15.4 (59.7)	12.9 (55.2)	12.4 (54.3)	13.6 (56.5)	15.1 (59.2)	16.9 (62.4)	18.8 (65.8)	21.0 (69.8)	17.8 (64.0)
Daily mean °C (°F)	17.2 (63.0)	17.8 (64.0)	16.3 (61.3)	13.4 (56.1)	10.6 (51.1)	8.3 (46.9)	7.6 (45.7)	8.7 (47.7)	10.3 (50.5)	12.1 (53.8)	13.7 (56.7)	15.9 (60.6)	12.7 (54.8)
Mean daily minimum °C (°F)	11.5 (52.7)	11.9 (53.4)	10.7 (51.3)	7.9 (46.2)	5.7 (42.3)	3.6 (38.5)	2.7 (36.9)	3.8 (38.8)	5.5 (41.9)	7.2 (45.0)	8.6 (47.5)	10.7 (51.3)	7.5 (45.5)
Average rainfall mm (inches)	82 (3.2)	95 (3.7)	90 (3.5)	106 (4.2)	126 (5.0)	137 (5.4)	141 (5.6)	128 (5.0)	116 (4.6)	112 (4.4)	118 (4.6)	115 (4.5)	1,366 (53.7)
Source: NIWA

== Education ==
Putāruru Primary School is a state primary school on the main street, with a roll of 215. The school opened in 1906.

Putāruru College is a state secondary school at the northern entrance of the town, by the Oraka River, with a roll of 406. It opened as Putaruru High School in 1929, and adopted its current name on merging with Putaruru Intermediate in 2003.

Te Wharekura o Te Kaokaoroa o Pātetere is a Māori medium composite school, with a roll of 294. It opened in 2006.

St Mary's Catholic School is a state-integrated primary school, with a roll of 170. The school opened in 1944.

All these schools are co-educational. Rolls are as of July 2026.

== Notable people ==
- Grant Fox (born 1962), former All Black
- Honey Hireme (born 1981), former New Zealand rugby player
- Glen Mitchell (born 1972), Olympic cyclist
- Lorraine Moller (born 1955), Olympic athlete
- Gareth Morgan (born 1953), economist, philanthropist
- Jennifer Robyn (Jenny) Shattock, former South Waikato mayor
- Wayne Smith (born 1957), former All Black and former All Black coach
