= Kinleith Branch =

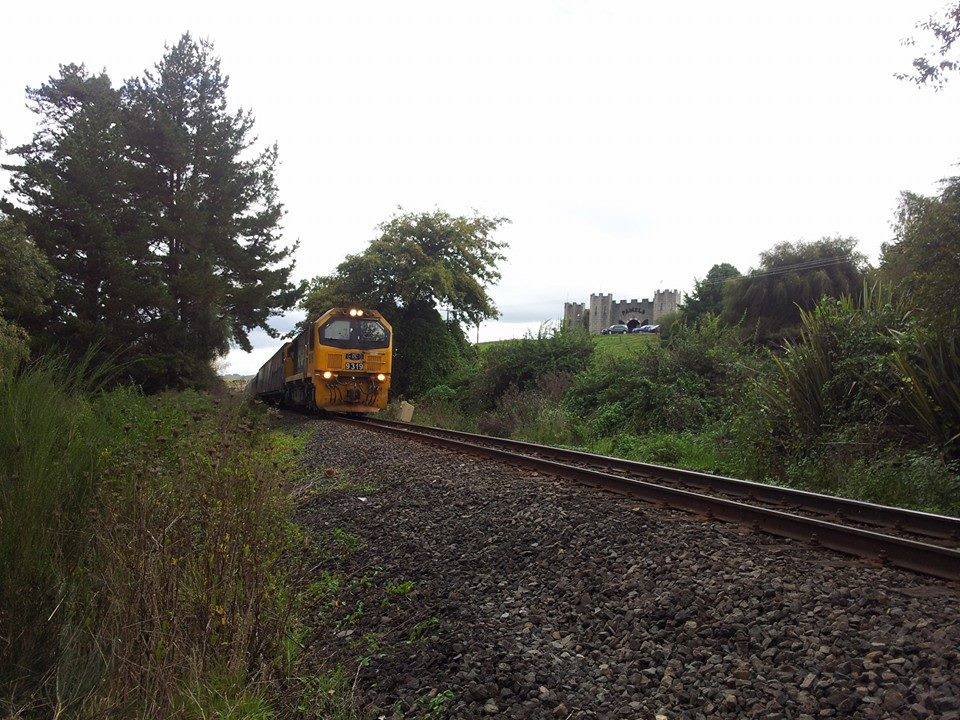
- DL-hauled freight passes Castle Pamela near Tīrau on 4 June 2015.

Overview
- Status: Open, freight only
- Owner: New Zealand Railways Corporation
- Termini: Morrinsville, Waikato; Kinleith Mill
- Stations: Walton (East Coast Main Trunk) Waharoa Matamata Hinuera Okoroire Tīrau / Oxford Taumangi Putāruru (for Rotorua Branch) Lichfield

Service
- Operator(s): KiwiRail
- Rolling stock: None

History
- Opened: 6 October 1952 (as a heavy-rail line)

Technical
- Line length: 65 km (40 mi)
- Number of tracks: Single
- Character: Rural
- Track gauge: 1,067 mm (3 ft 6 in)

Map

The Kinleith Branch railway line is located in the Waikato region of New Zealand. The line was constructed by the Thames Valley and Rotorua Railway Company, Taupo Totara Timber Company and rebuilt by the Public Works Department primarily to serve the Kinleith Mill in 1952. It is 65 kilometres (40 mi) in length.

== History ==
The New Zealand Government Railways line to Thames was opened to Morrinsville on 1 October 1884. Taking advantage of enabling legislation, the Thames Valley and Rotorua Railway Company originally built the line from Morrinsville as part of its planned route to Rotorua as far as Lichfield. The Morrinsville-Oxford section opened without any ceremony on 8 March 1886. NZGR took over the company on 8 March 1886, instead building the Rotorua Branch railway line from Putāruru. The 8 km (5 mi) section between Putāruru and Lichfield was closed by NZGR in 1897 as it served no purpose. The Taupo Totara Timber Company (TTT Company) then used the disused railway formation from Putāruru for its lightly constructed bush tramway line to Mokai, near Lake Taupō.

Following the exhaustion of native timber in the region, the TTT Company line closed on 26 October 1944. The government saw that the line had greater potential and in September 1946 acquired the 29 km (18 mi) section between Putāruru and Kinleith. This line formed part of a proposed railway line to Taupō. The section of line reopened on 9 June 1947 under the control of the Public Works Department, using geared steam locomotives purchased from the TTT Co. The Public Works Department eventually rebuilt the line with heavier rail, some of it brought from Taranaki after opening of the Turakina deviation, wider curves and slighter grades, reaching Tokoroa in 1949 and Kinleith in 1952.

=== Bridges ===
There were 14 bridges on the original Morrinsville to Oxford section. No 1 bridge, over the Piako River at Morrinsville, was realigned from the original plans to be a 7-span, 220 ft (67 m) skew bridge, 54 ft (16 m) above river, made of kauri and totara.

== Services ==
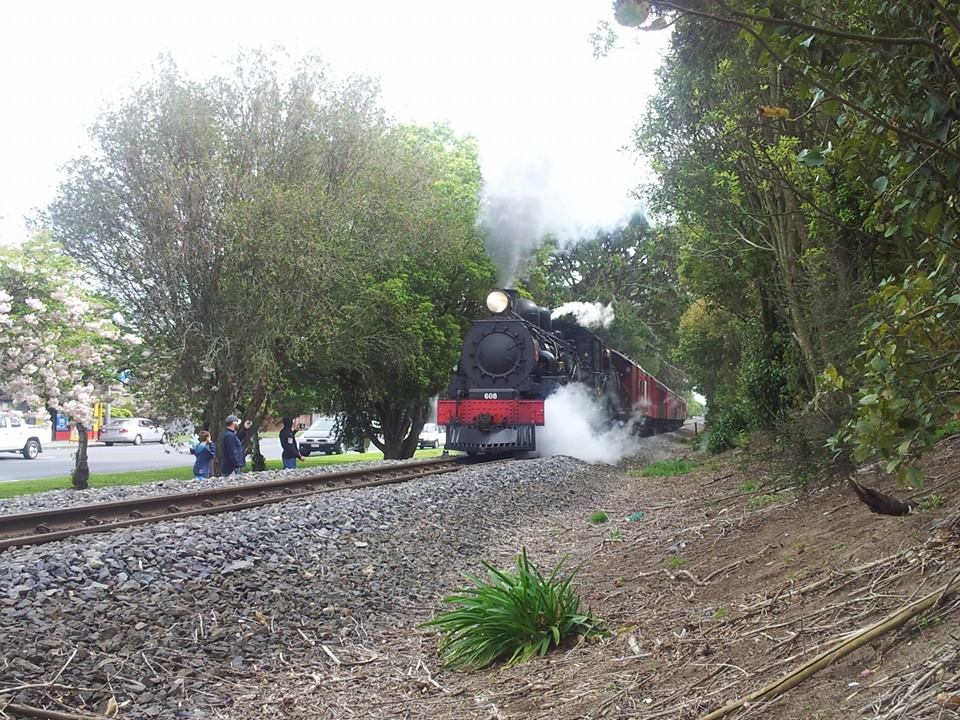
A^{B} class steam locomotive 608 on an excursion at Matamata in June 2015.

From 1913 the Morrinsville to Putāruru service was operated by a motor train.

Since the withdrawal of the Geyserland Express to Rotorua in October 2001, all services on the line are freight trains. The line from Putāruru - Kinleith Mill has only seen regular freight trains since being rebuilt in 1952. Occasional excursion passenger trains have operated, some being hauled by preserved steam locomotives.

The branch sees eight trains in and out of Kinleith each weekday, two on Saturdays and four on Sundays. Tokoroa Road Rail Terminal opened in 2015 and handled an average of about 11 containers a day in its first 6 months.

== See also ==
- East Coast Main Trunk
- Cambridge Branch
- Glen Afton Branch
- Glen Massey Line'
- Kimihia Branch
- Rotorua Branch
- Thames Branch
