= South Waikato District Council =

Coordinates: 38.2200969°S 175.8727922°E

Type
- Type: Unicameral of South Waikato District
- Houses: Governing Body
- Term limits: None

History
- Founded: 6 March 1989

Leadership
- Mayor: Gary Petley

Structure
- Seats: seats (1 mayor, ward seats)
- Length of term: 3 years

Website
- southwaikato.govt.nz

South Waikato District Council is the territorial authority for the South Waikato District of New Zealand's North Island. It serves as the district's local government, with the Waikato Regional Council serving as the regional authority. It has existed since the 1989 reforms to local government.

The council has 10 councillors and is chaired by the mayor of South Waikato (currently Gary Petley since October 2022).

In 2026 16,631 were registered to vote in the District.

== Composition ==
=== Councillors ===
- Mayor Gary Petley
- Tokoroa Ward: Elvisa van der Leden, Maria Te Kanawa, Thomas Lee, Josiah Teokotai, Michael Thomas, Ani Lipscombe
- Putāruru Ward: Sandra Wallace, Zed Latinovich, Dave Shaw
- Tīrau Ward: Kerry Purdy

=== Community boards ===
- Tīrau Community Board: Chris Hunt, Fiona Van Lent, Mandeep Singh, Graham Singers

== History ==
The council was established in 1989, through the merger of Putaruru Borough Council (established in 1926) and Tokoroa Borough Council (established in 1975). Matamata County Council, which had first met in 1909 and was based in Tīrau, was also part of the transitional committee in 1989.

== Elections ==
- 1989
- 1992
- 1995
- 1998
- 2001
- 2004
- 2007
- 2010
- 2013
- 2016
- 2019
- 2022
- 2025
