= Mayor of South Waikato =

Head of the municipal government of South Waikato District

- Incumbent; Gary Petley since 2022
- Style: His/Her Worship
- Term length: Three years, renewable
- Inaugural holder: Gordon Blake
- Formation: 1989
- Salary: $133,621
- Website: Official website

The mayor of South Waikato officiates over the South Waikato District Council.

Gary Petley is the current mayor of South Waikato being elected in the 2022 local elections. Previous mayor Jenny Shattock was elected in 2016, becoming the district's first female mayor.

== List of mayors ==
There have been four mayors of South Waikato.

	Mayor	Portrait	Term of office
1	Gordon Blake		1989–2004
2	Neil Sinclair		2004–2016
3	Jenny Shattock		2016–2022
4	Gary Petley		2022–present
