= Public transport in New Zealand =

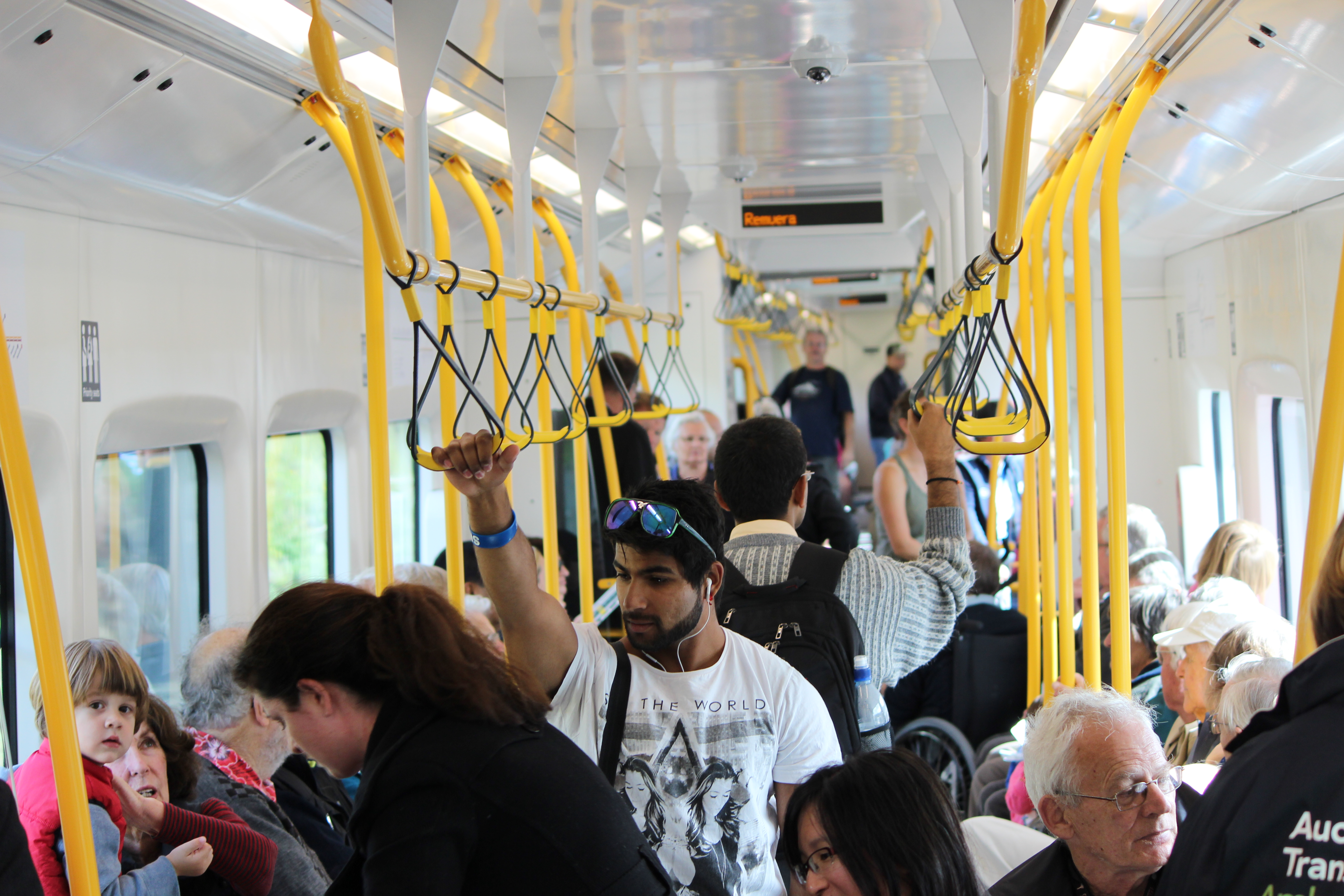
Passengers using public transport

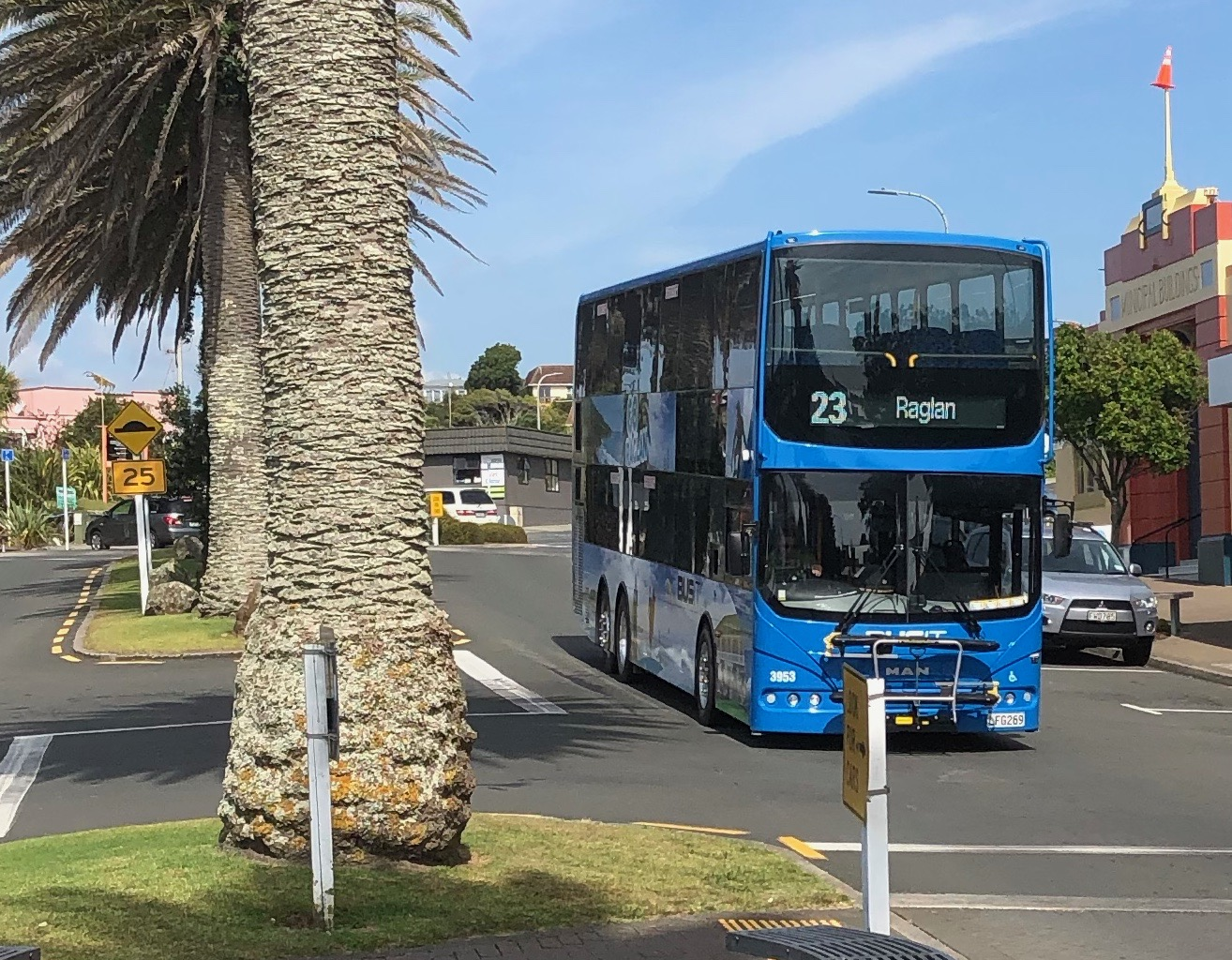
Bus

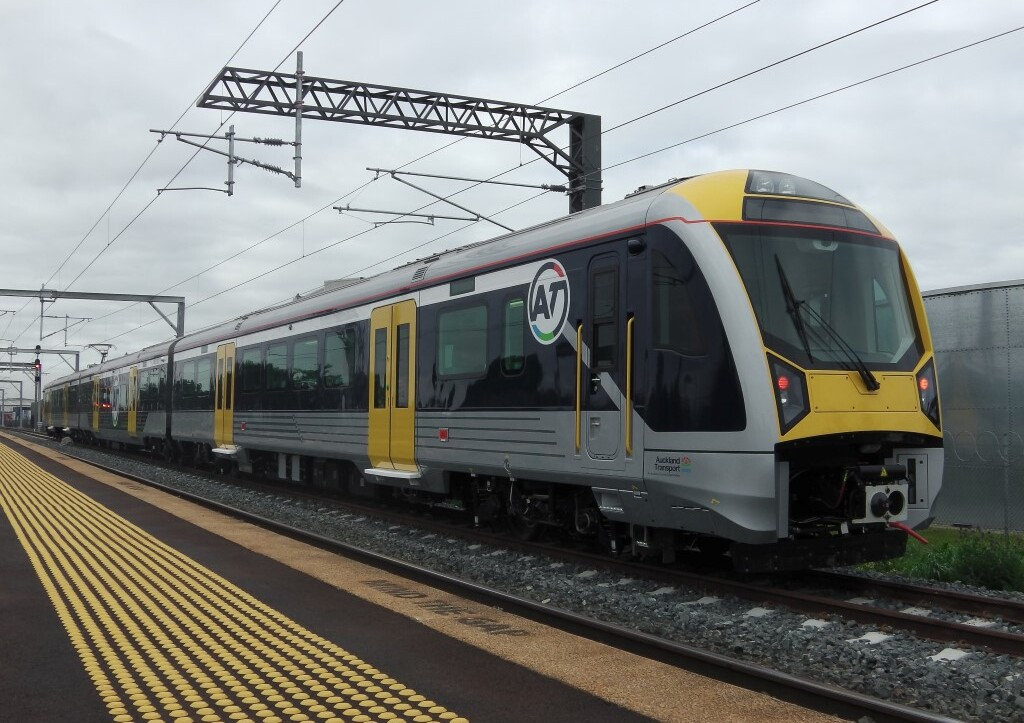
Train

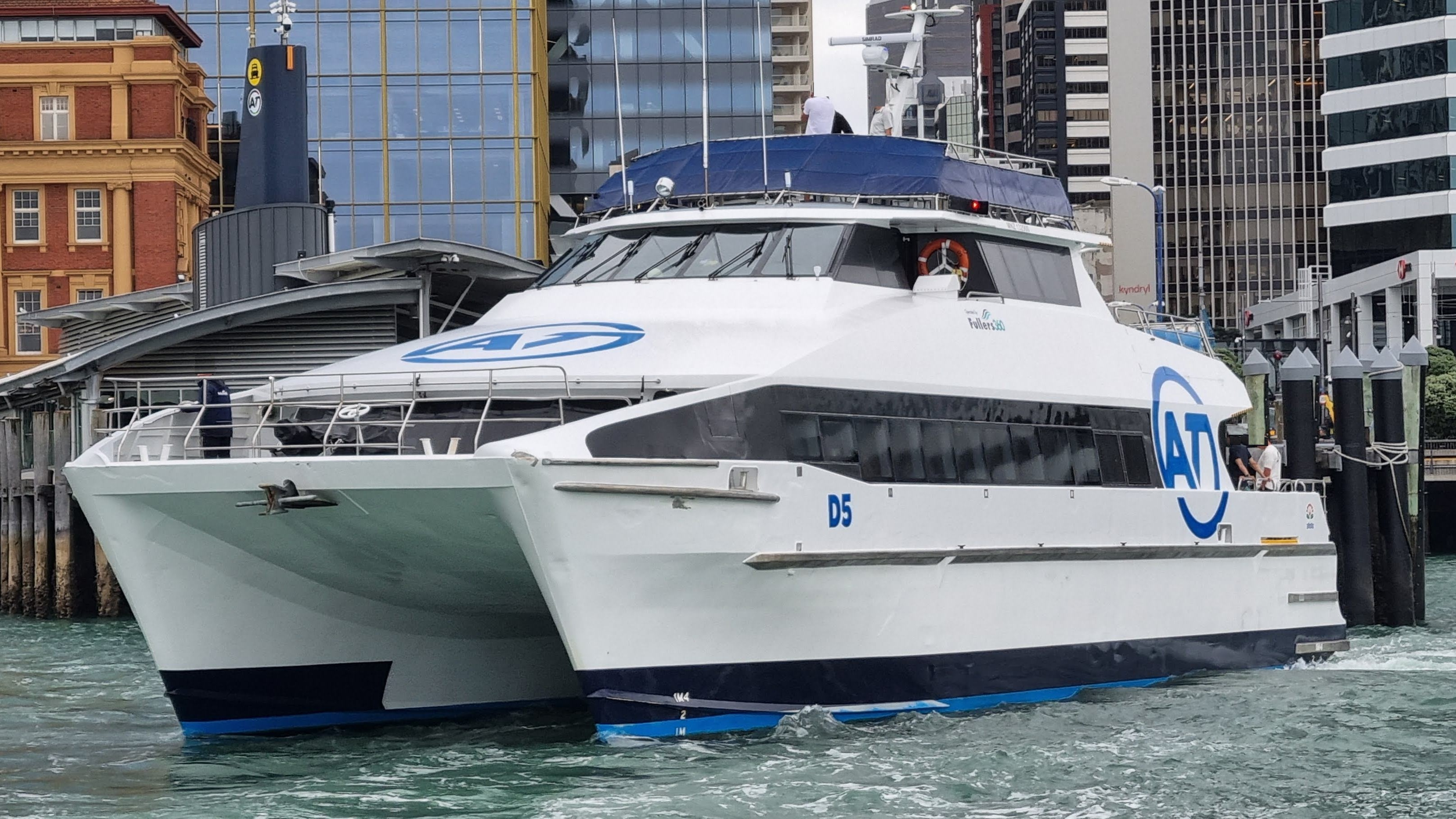
Ferry

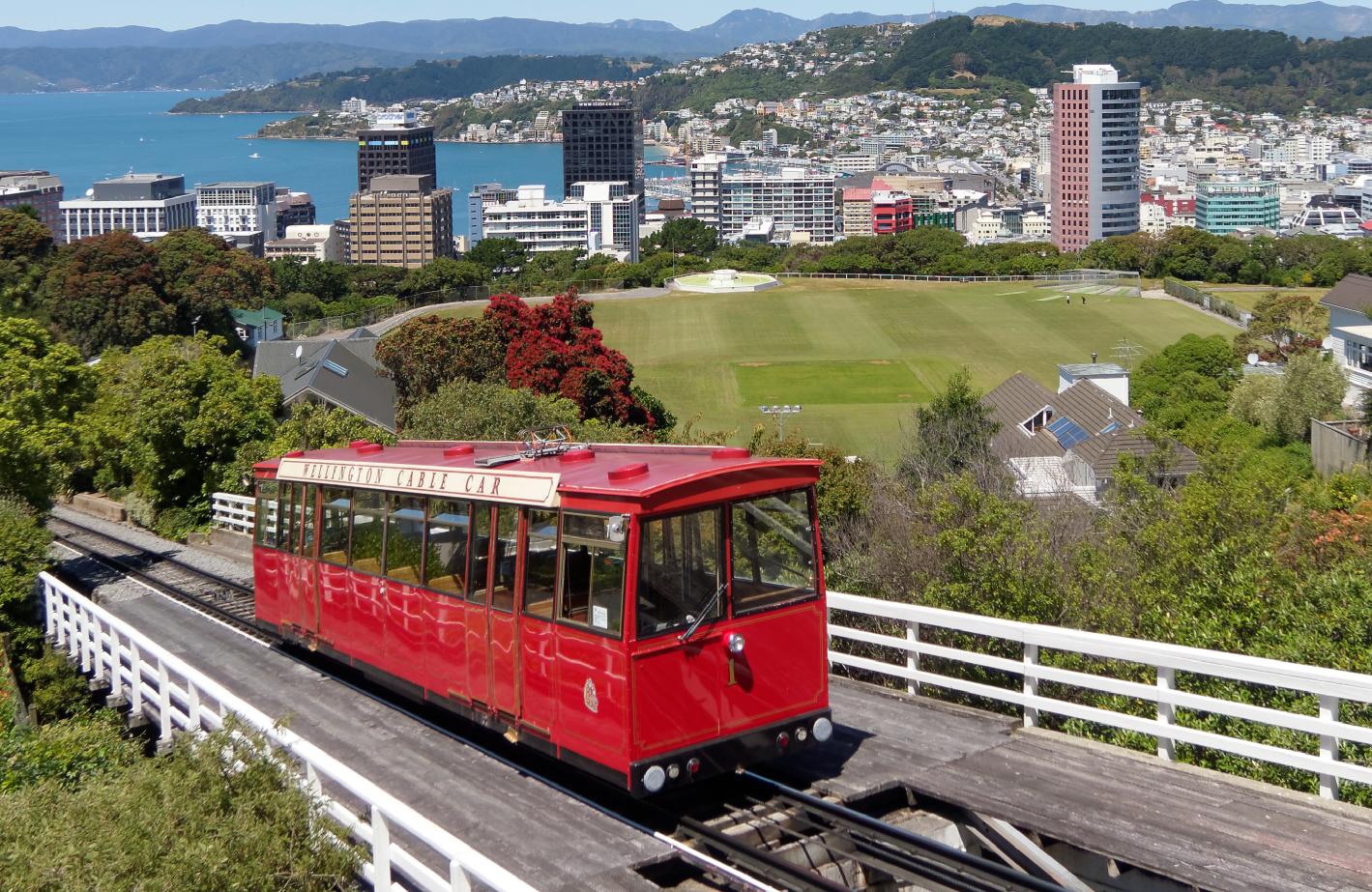
Funicular

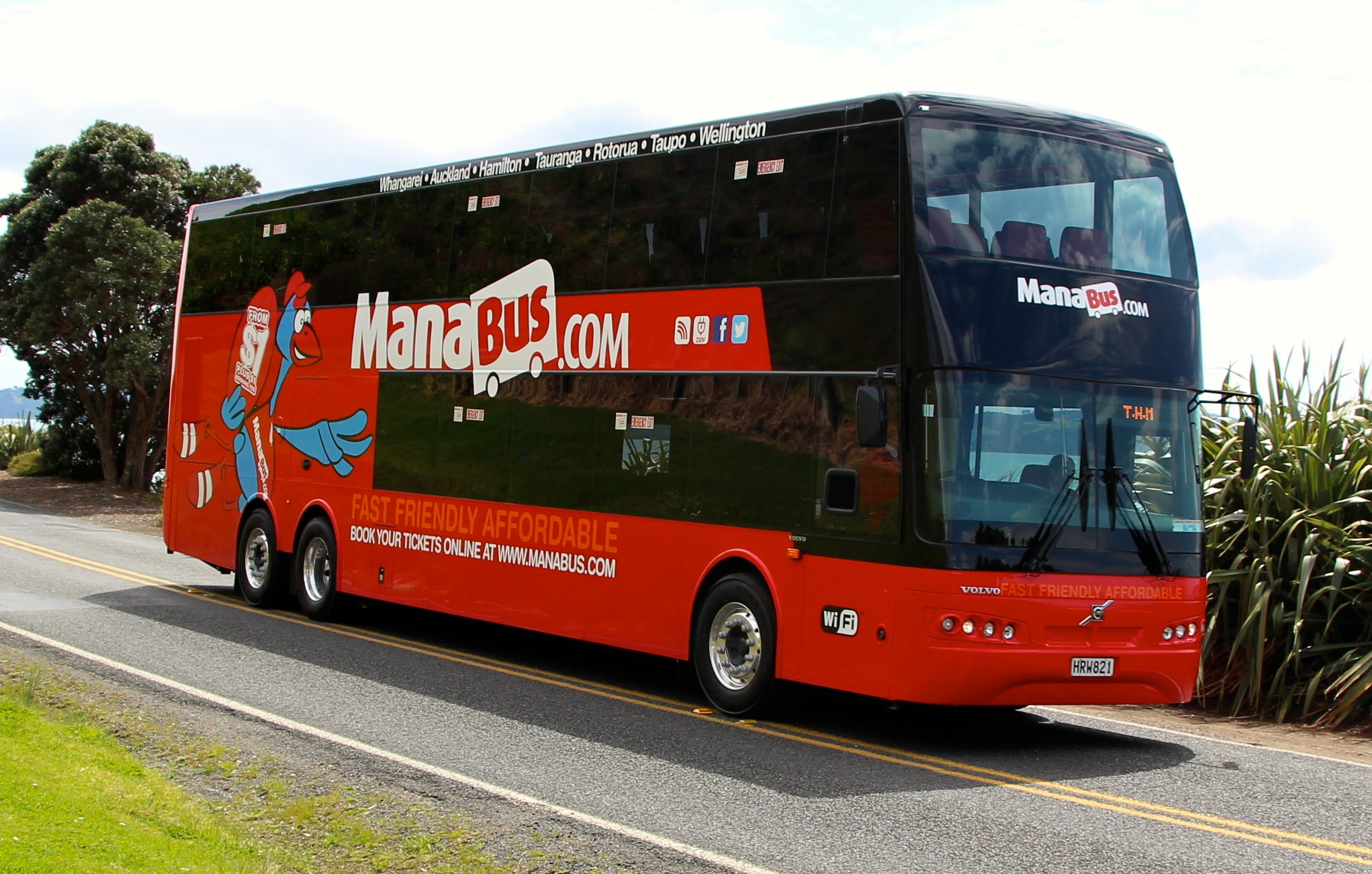
Intercity bus

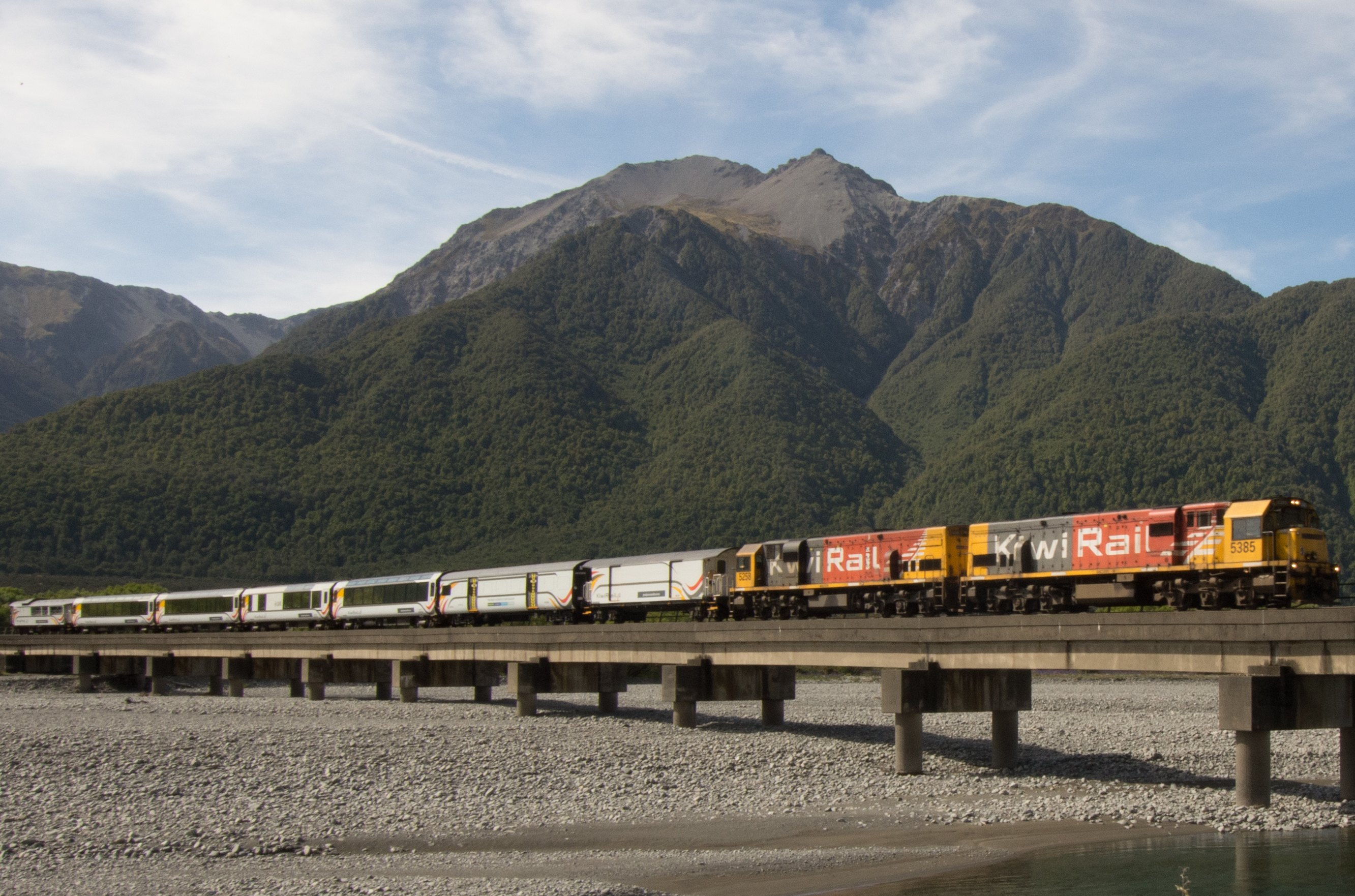
Intercity train

Public transport in New Zealand consists of bus, boat, heavy rail, and some light rail facilities. Two of the country's largest cities, Auckland and Wellington, also have suburban rail systems, while many cities also operate local ferry services. The country's first metro system, the City Rail Link, opened in 2026 in central Auckland. There have been multiple proposals to build light rail in major cities, though none are currently being built. Remaining tramway lines include heritage lines in Auckland's Wynyard Quarter and in Western Springs at the Museum of transport and technology (MOTAT). Outside of Auckland there is a small heritage tram line in Whanganui and a small line in central Christchurch.

With the exception of the Wellington Region, from the 1960s New Zealand has shifted to have generally low rates of public transport usage, with 90% of urban trips by private cars in 2018. The decline, which was worse than in the United States in 2001, coincided with private cars becoming more affordable. Many extensive tramway systems were removed in the mid-century period as part of an Australasian trend. Public transport usage continued falling throughout the decades afterwards. Higher operations and maintenance costs from increased petrol prices also put operators at a financial loss.

Intercity public transport in New Zealand is very limited. Almost all intercity bus services are operated for-profit by a single private company, InterCity. InterCity operates only major national routes, and few connecting and regional routes. Intercity rail in New Zealand has declined sharply in the last few decades, being mostly composed of lines dedicated to tourists. There are two commuter only lines: Te Huia between Auckland and Hamilton, and the Capital Connection between Wellington and Palmerston North.

Poor usage has led government planners to assume that the disuse of public transport came from public distaste, rather than poor service, leading to a cycle of underinvestment and neglect. This is despite increasing population in the areas where public transport previously commanded ridership. A disorganised and fragmented governance structure around public transport has led to indecision and a lack of a uniform national and regional strategy. In the last few decades there has been increased interest in public transport, due to road congestion and environmental concerns. Public transport services have begun to be expanded and improved, and in some regions, like Auckland and Otago, patronage has been steadily increasing.

== Usage ==
Public transport usage in New Zealand is relatively low. According to the 2023 New Zealand census, only 3.7% of employed people commuted by bus, 1.3% by train, and 0.2% by ferry. In contrast, 66.1% drove themselves to work, 3.6% were passengers in a vehicle, 6.1% walked or cycled, and 17.7% worked from home. Public transport use was higher in the Wellington and Auckland regions, where public transport systems are more developed: 15.5% of Wellington residents and 7.8% of Auckland residents commuted via public transport. In comparison, just 0.1% of West Coast residents used public transport, largely due to the region’s low population density.

Public transport use is slightly higher among those travelling for education, primarily because many students are not old enough to drive and rely on other modes of travel. According to the 2023 New Zealand census, 6.9% of students travelled by public bus, 9.4% by school bus, 1.5% by train, and 0.1% by ferry. In contrast, 10.4% drove themselves, 40.8% were passengers in a vehicle, 21.4% walked or cycled, and 8.3% studied from home. Additionally, public transport use has become stigmatised as a form of welfare for people who cannot afford a private vehicle, leading decision makers to be passive around public transport improvements.

The Household Travel Survey's proportion of public transport trips was even lower, at 2.3% in 2013/14. These figures are for the whole of New Zealand and include centres that may have limited or no public transport.

In 2001, controversial analyst Wendell Cox described the Auckland Regional Council's (ARC) plan to increase public transport to the downtown area to 20% of total share as "a simply unachievable goal". He also described as "a fantasy" Christchurch's plans for an increase to 10–15% by 2018.

As can be seen from this table, there has been minimal increase over five years – public transport mode % of total trip legs by region (from NZ Household Travel Survey):

Region	2006/07	2013/14
Northland	0.1%	0.2%
Auckland	2.7%	3.9%
Waikato	0.5%	0.9%
Bay of Plenty	0.4%	0.9%
Gisborne	0.2%	0.2%
Hawkes Bay	0.2%	0.4%
Taranaki	0.2%	0.4%
Manawatu/Wanganui	0.3%	0.5%
Wellington	4.1%	4.6%
Nelson/Marlborough/Tasman	0%	0.2%
West Coast	0.1%	0.1%
Canterbury	1.8%	1.8%
Otago	0.6%	0.9%
Southland	0.3%	0.3%

More up to date figures are available for numbers of bus passengers, which show declines in most areas outside the main cities:

Bus passenger boardings (millions)	2012/13	2013/14	2014/15	2015/16	2016/17
Northland	0.31	0.32	0.31	0.32	0.32
Auckland	53.53	55.85	59.80	60.24	62.70
Waikato	4.32	4.37	4.34	4.09	3.99
Bay of Plenty	2.85	3.01	3.11	3.33	3.14
Gisborne	0.16	0.14	0.14	0.15	0.14
Hawkes Bay	0.76	0.80	0.74	0.69	0.69
Taranaki	0.56	0.58	0.59	0.61	0.61
Manawatu/Wanganui	1.62	1.58	1.45	1.36	1.30
Wellington	23.61	23.98	24.10	24.33	24.44
Marlborough (with Nelson from 16/17)	0.03	0.03	0.03	0.03	
Nelson (incl. Marl from 16/17)	0.35	0.40	0.42	0.41	0.45
Canterbury	13.42	14.17	14.22	13.74	13.25
West Coast	0.04	0.02	0.02	0.03	0.01
Otago (incl. Queenstown)	2.24	2.85	2.81	2.68	2.65
Southland	0.31	0.29	0.25	0.21	0.20
Total	104.11	108.39	112.32	112.20	113.89

== Modes ==
Buses are the most common form of public transport in New Zealand, making up the majority of trips in every city that has public transport (and often being the only public transport mode available). InterCity and SKIP Bus are the only companies operating city to city bus transportations. They are followed by trains, which are found in Wellington and Auckland. Ferries also play a role, mainly in Auckland but also in other cities. Trams in New Zealand, while once common in many cities and towns, now survive only as heritage displays. Cable cars have also been employed; the Dunedin cable tramway system was both the second and second-last to operate in the world, while the Wellington Cable Car is now a funicular.

== Provision by area ==
=== Auckland ===
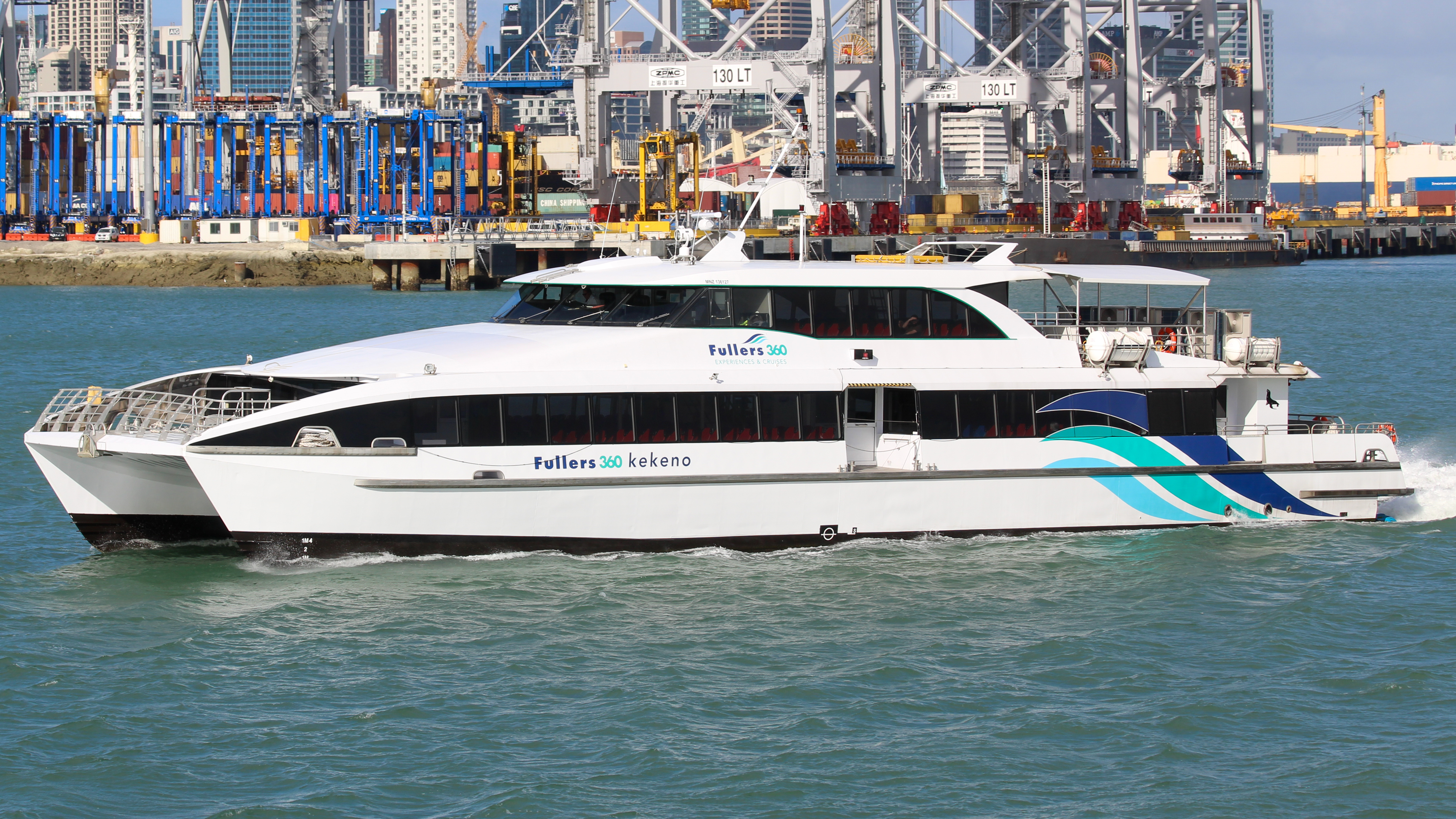
Kekeno, a vessel belonging to Fullers360

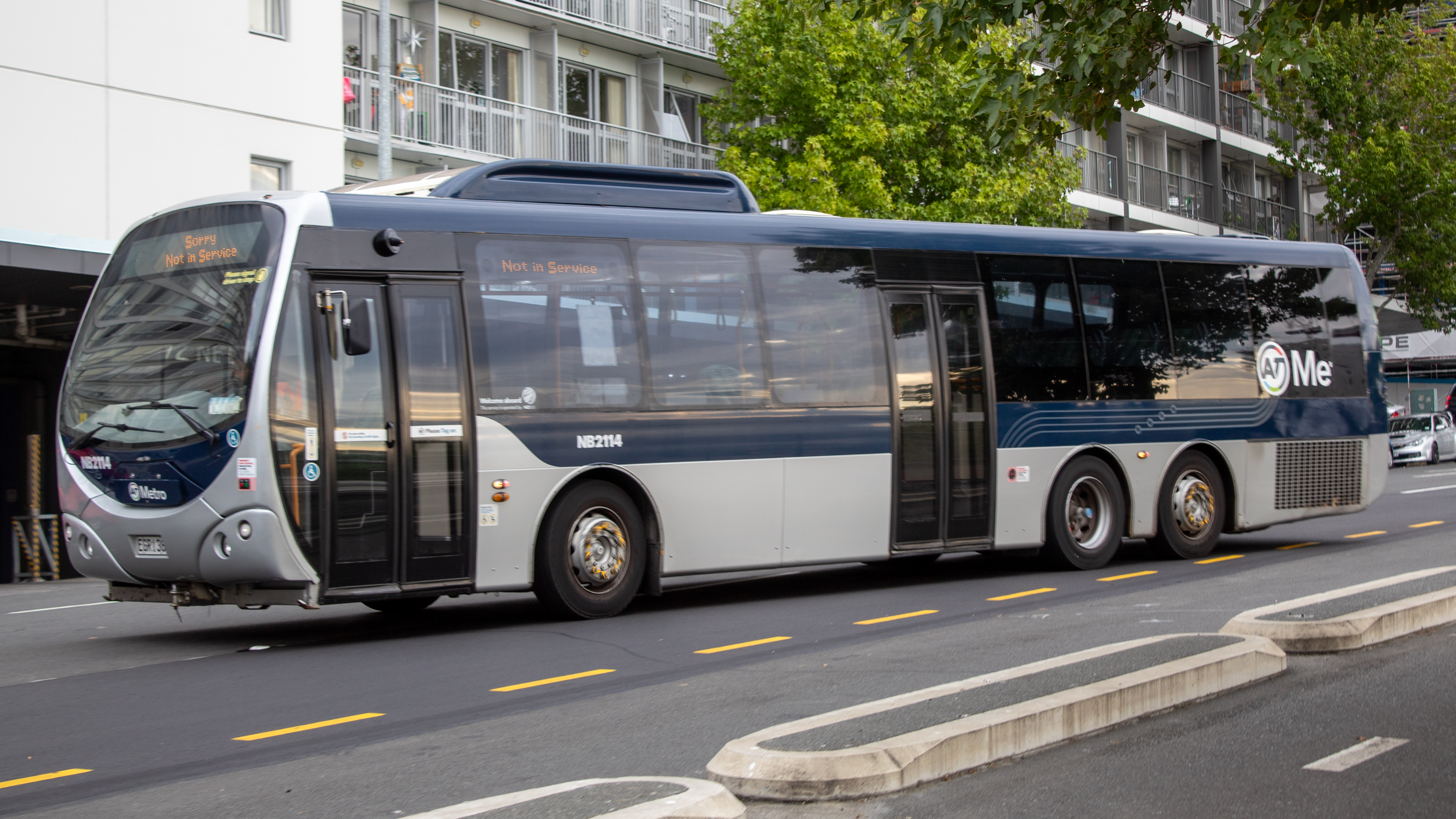
An example bus from Auckland, NZ Bus 2114

Public transport in Auckland is managed by Auckland Transport (AT), a CCO of Auckland Council, under the AT and AT Metro brands. It consists of buses, trains, and ferries. The Auckland public transport system is New Zealand's largest by total passenger volume, although not by trips per capita.

Buses are the most widely used form of public transport in Auckland. They are operated by a number of companies, including NZ Bus, Ritchies Transport including Birkenhead Transport and Ritchies-Murphy, Howick and Eastern Buses, GoBus, Waiheke Bus Company (Fullers360), Pavlovich Coachlines, Bayes Coachlines and Tranzurban Auckland. The route network is dense, covering all parts of the Auckland urban area (including Waiheke Island).

Auckland also has a commuter rail system, one of two in the country. The system uses AM class electric trains, following the electrification of the Auckland rail network in 2014. Following the opening of the City Rail Link, there are three lines: East West line (E-W), Onehunga West line (O-W), and South City line (S-C). The trains are operated by Auckland One Rail. During rail closures, rail replacement buses are run, contracted to Auckland's AT Metro contracted operators, or two charter companies Coachways New Zealand, Kiwi Coaches or Broughman Buses, among other smaller charter operators.

Ferries also play a significant role in Auckland's transport network — more so than in other New Zealand cities. Ferries travel between the city centre and a number of destinations, including several points on the North Shore, Half Moon Bay, Waiheke Island, Rangitoto Island, and Great Barrier Island. The largest operator is Fullers360.

Auckland, like many others in New Zealand, previously operated trams. The first, horse-drawn, ran in 1884. Electric trams were introduced in 1902, operating until 1956. The Museum of Transport and Technology subsequently constructed a 2 km heritage line linking its two sites and Auckland Zoo. A tourist-oriented tram service has operated at Wynyard Quarter since 2011.

=== Christchurch ===
The Christchurch public transport system is based principally around buses, although the city also has a ferry service and a heritage tramway. The services are operated under the Metro brand by bus companies Red Bus and Go Bus, administered by the regional council, Environment Canterbury.

Buses operate to all parts of the Christchurch urban area, including Lyttelton. There are also services to outlying towns such as Rangiora, Lincoln, and Burnham. There are around 40 routes in total. A free shuttle in the central city with hybrid-electric Designline buses was formerly operated until the 2011 Christchurch earthquake.

Since 12 November 2007, Christchurch has been carrying out the first New Zealand trial for bikes on buses, which amongst other things gives cyclists access through the Lyttelton road tunnel.

A ferry service operates between Lyttelton and Diamond Harbour, a small settlement on the opposite side of Lyttelton Harbour.

Christchurch used to operate an extensive tram network, but this service was discontinued in 1954. In 1995, a heritage tramway was re-opened in the city centre, primarily serving tourists. The circuit was damaged by the 2011 Christchurch earthquake and has since reopened.

=== Otago ===
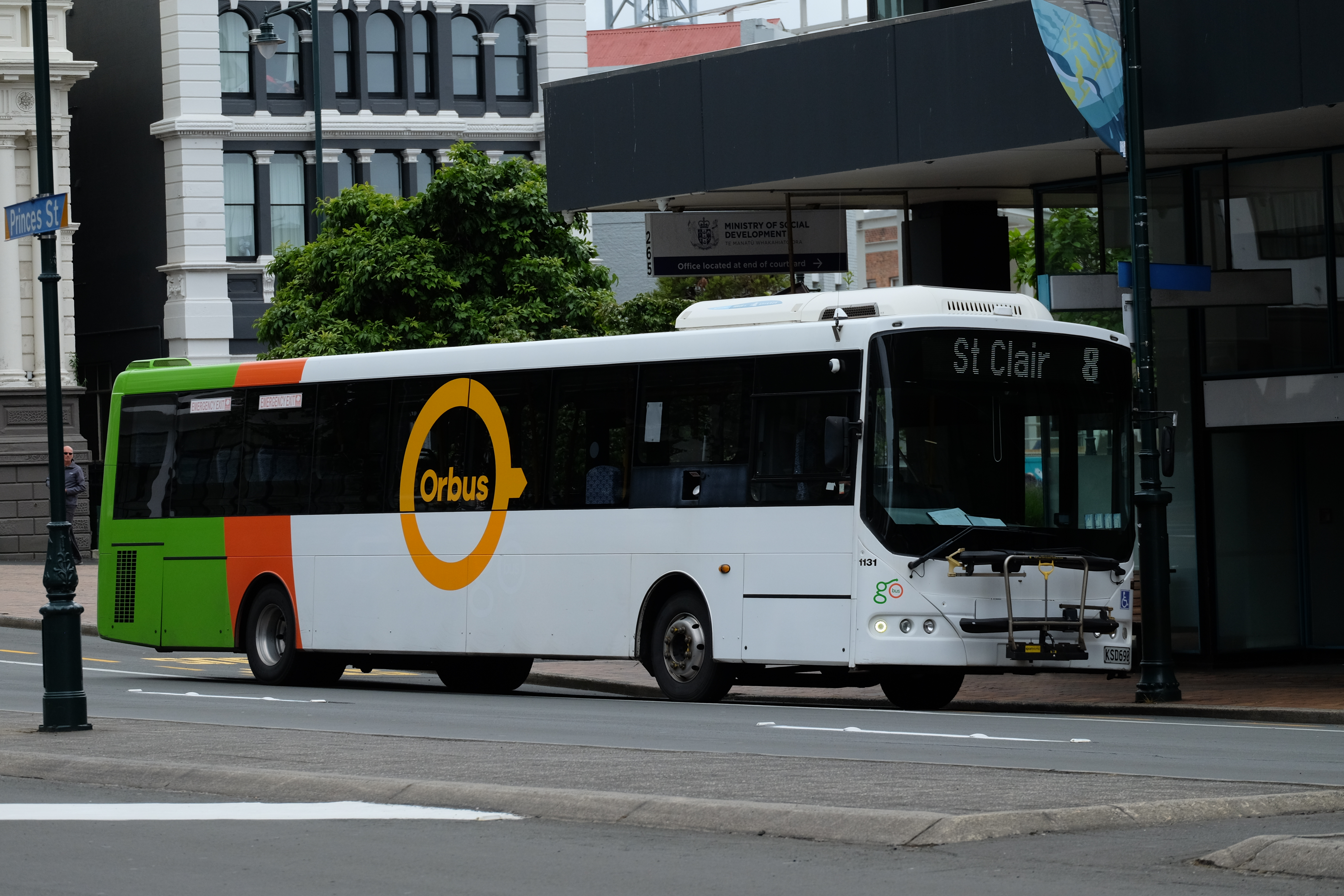
A typical bus in Dunedin

==== Dunedin ====
Dunedin's public transport system is based around buses, and formerly, trams, and the Dunedin cable car. There are 20 routes, covering the Dunedin area (including Mosgiel and Port Chalmers), plus a service to Waikouaiti and Palmerston. Services are operated privately by Ritchies and Go Bus, on routes and fares determined by Otago Regional Council, under the brand name "Orbus".

The system operates primarily radially, with suburban buses heading into the centre city, and then back out to a suburb on the other side, before returning back the other way. There is also a single orbital route along the ridge of the city.

The majority of bus routes in the centre city run on the same streets, effectively increasing bus frequency between the University of Otago and The Oval. Despite this, all the roads in the CBD are open to all traffic, including the Dunedin Bus Hub terminal.

The city formerly operated other forms of public transport:

- Cable cars (similar to the famous San Francisco cable cars) operated between 1881 and 1957
- Electric trams operated between 1900 and 1956.
- Dunedin trolleybuses operated between 1950 and 1982.
- Suburban trains ran from the Dunedin Railway Station to Mosgiel until 1982 and Port Chalmers until 1979.

=== Hamilton ===
Hamilton has a bus system under the name BUSIT covering most of its urban area, with around 25 routes. There are also bus services to (and sometimes between) other towns in the Waikato region — Taupō, Huntly, Coromandel, Thames, Tokoroa, Meremere, Te Kauwhata, Cambridge, Paeroa, Raglan, Mangakino, and Te Awamutu are among the destinations.

Hamilton formerly had a commuter train to Auckland, the Waikato Connection. Proposals were floated in 2007 to re-instate the service. The proposal was dropped in a 2011 report in favour of extension only from Pukekohe to Tuakau. Plans for a commuter service between Hamilton and Papakura were revisited in 2017 and received funding in 2019. The service, called Te Huia, launched in April 2021.

=== Invercargill ===
Invercargill has a bus service with six routes operated by BusSmart INVERCARGILL (the buses travel to different areas around the city, with most travelling in the same directions). They operate from a hub outside Invercargill Central Limited in the central city and are administered by the Invercargill City Council. People with a Bee Card get cheaper fares then people who use cash. Super Gold Card holders may use the bus for free by using a Bee Card during off-peak hours.

Invercargill formerly had the southernmost tram system in the world. Construction began in January 1911 and the network operated from 26 March 1912 to 10 September 1952. At its greatest extent, it had four separate routes. Commuter trains also ran along the Bluff Branch railway line between Invercargill and Bluff from the line's opening in 1867 until the final service was cancelled in 1967. Multiple stops within Invercargill were serviced, and as late as 1950, seven trains ran each way on the average weekday.

=== Manawatū-Whanganui ===
Public transport in the Manawatū-Whanganui region consists primarily of bus services administered by Horizons Regional Council under the Connect brand. Urban networks operate in Palmerston North, Whanganui and Feilding, supplemented by regional services connecting smaller towns and rural communities.

Palmerston North has eight cross-city bus routes serving its suburbs via the Main Street Bus Hub, three routes connecting residential areas with Massey University, and a service to Ashhurst. The network was redesigned in March 2024, introducing more frequent services and an entirely electric bus fleet. Nearby Feilding has an urban loop service, known as the Orbiter, and a connecting service to Palmerston North. Both were upgraded in July 2026, with increased frequencies and electric buses.

Whanganui's bus network comprises five urban routes, introduced in April 2026. Two high-frequency services, branded Te Ngaru The Tide, operate at 20-minute intervals, while three additional routes provide hourly services. All five routes operate seven days a week. The city also has the historic Durie Hill Elevator, a public transport lift opened in 1919, which was temporarily closed for maintenance in 2026.

Regional bus services connect Palmerston North and Whanganui with towns including Levin, Marton and Taihape. In the Horowhenua District, services connect Levin with Palmerston North and Waikanae, alongside a limited local service linking communities such as Foxton, Foxton Beach and Waitārere Beach.

Passenger rail is provided by the Capital Connection, a weekday commuter service between Palmerston North and Wellington, stopping at Shannon and Levin within the region.

=== New Plymouth ===
New Plymouth has a bus system with nine routes covering most of its urban area, operated by Tranzit Coachlines. There are also bus services to other towns in the New Plymouth District; Bell Block, Inglewood, Ōakura and Waitara. Services are administered by the Taranaki Regional Council.

New Plymouth formerly operated electric trams over four routes between 10 March 1916 and 23 July 1954, as well as New Zealand's only regional trolleybus system between 1950 and 1967.

=== Wellington ===
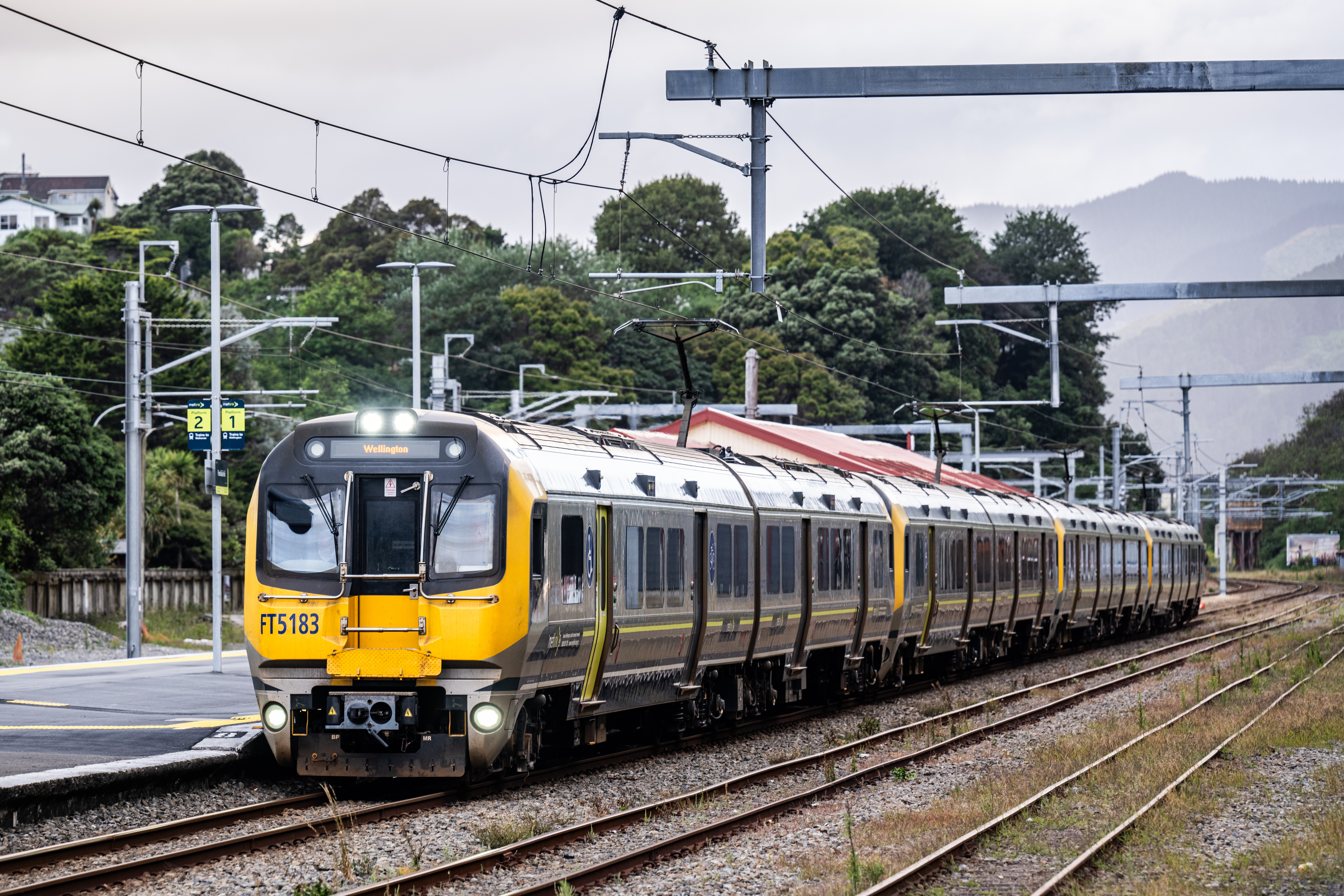
A Wellington commuter train

Wellington has the highest percentage of citizens using public transport in the country. Its public transport system, organised under the Metlink brand, consists of buses, trains, ferries, and a funicular (the Wellington Cable Car).

The most widely used form of public transport is buses, which are operated mainly by Tranzurban Wellington and NZ Bus (both using multiple brands). The network extends across the whole region, with slightly over 100 routes and around 2,800 stops. Until its final closure in 2017 some bus routes were served by the Wellington trolleybus system, which replaced the city's historic Wellington tramway system.

The second most popular form of public transport is rail, which makes up around a half of the total ridership. Wellington's commuter rail network carries passengers between the central city and suburban areas to the north, as well as to smaller towns in Wairarapa. It is the larger of New Zealand's two commuter rail systems, with 49 stations, and is mostly electrified. The two non-electrified services are diesel trains: the Wairarapa Connection from Masterton and the Capital Connection from Palmerston North. The latter is not run by the suburban operator, Transdev, but by long distance operator The Great Journeys of New Zealand; however, in practice, it serves as a commuter service.

The remainder of trips use either the Wellington ferry system or the Wellington Cable Car. The ferry service operates across Wellington Harbour, connecting Eastbourne, Matiu/Somes Island, and the central city. The iconic Wellington Cable Car (strictly speaking, a funicular, rather than a true cable car) travels between the central city and the suburb of Kelburn, and is still used as a regular means of transport.

=== Nelson/Tasman ===
Nelson has six routes, a Late Late Bus and a Peak overflow bus which operate in the Nelson/Tasman area, with a bus hub at Whakatu Square. It is operated as eBus, previously NBus. There are two express services: one to Motueka and one to Wakefield.

=== Other areas ===
- Blenheim has bus service operating Mondays through to Saturdays. It has two loop routes, serving the northern and southern halves of the town from a central hub, and a route connecting Blenheim to Picton. It is operated by Ritchies Coachlines on behalf of the Marlborough District Council.
- Gisborne operates a bus service covering most of the town's urban area. There are six routes. It is run by a local company on behalf of Gisborne District Council.
- Masterton has an internal bus network consisting of three routes, operated as part of the Wellington regional transport system. There are also bus connections to nearby towns, and regular train service to Wellington.
- Napier-Hastings had a bus service with nine routes — three in Napier proper, three in Hastings proper, and routes between Hastings and Napier, between Hastings and Flaxmere, and between Hastings and Havelock North. The buses are operated by Go Bus Transport Ltd. They are funded by the regional council. From 7 June 2022 three of Hastings' bus routes have been replaced by three on-demand minibuses.
- Queenstown has four bus routes under the brand Orbus as part of the Otago Regional Council. They connect Queenstown with the areas of Fernhill, Frankton, Kelvin Heights, Jacks Point, Arthurs Point, Lake Hayes and Arrowtown.
- Rotorua has a network of ten bus routes, serving all parts of the urban area. The buses are administered by the Bay of Plenty's regional council. There are links to other towns in the area.
- Taupō has three routes under the BUSIT service covering the Taupō urban area and to other towns in the Waikato.
- Tauranga employs buses and ferries in its public transport system. Its bus system has around a dozen routes, covering all major parts of its urban area. The buses run seven days a week. There are also bus connections to other places in the Bay of Plenty region. The buses are administered by the Bay of Plenty regional council. Ferry services run between central Tauranga, Mount Maunganui and Matakana Island.
- Timaru's public transport network had four bus routes within its urban area from 2013, plus a route to nearby Temuka, until the Gleniti, Grantlea and Watlington routes were replaced by seven on-demand 11 or 13 seat 'MyWay' vans, with bike racks, from February 2020. Fares had previously covered only 15% of costs. The remaining urban route is a loop, with a hub in the city centre. The trial service was made permanent in 2021, after ridership increased by 16%.
- West Coast Regional Council supports taxis under the Total Mobility scheme in Greymouth, Westport and Hokitika only. It does not include any buses, or the TranzAlpine train. West Coast has the lowest proportion of public transport journeys in the country at 0.1% of all trips. In the past, local public transport was provided by local tramways, local buses to Greymouth, Blackball, Dobson, Wallsend, Taylorville, Blaketown and Hokitika and passenger trains on the Blackball branch until 1940, Conns Creek until 1931, Midland Line until 1986, Ross until 1972, Seddonville until 1946 and Westport until 1967.
- Whangārei has a bus service administered by the regional council, funded by the district council and Land Transport New Zealand, and operated by Adams Travelines (a NZBus owned company) under the name CityLink Whangārei. The system has ten routes, covering most of the Whangārei urban area. It runs six days a week.

== Overview table ==
The table below lists towns in New Zealand that have or once had public transport systems. It includes only internal services (as opposed to services between towns), and does not include services run primarily for heritage reasons.

City	Buses	Bus rapid transit	Urban rail	Ferries	Funicular	Trams	Trolley buses	Articulated buses
Auckland	✓	✓	✓	✓	✗	(1884–1956)	(1938–1980)	✓
Blenheim	✓							
Christchurch	✓		(closed 1976)	✓		(1880–1954)	(1931–1956)	
Dunedin	✓		(closed 1982)	(1880s?-1950s?)		(1881–1957)	(1950–1982)	
Gisborne	✓					(1913–1929)		
Hamilton	✓							
Huntly	✓							
Invercargill	✓		(1867–1967)			(1912–1952)		
Levin	✓							
Masterton	✓							
Napier-Hastings	✓					(1913–1931)		
Nelson	✓					(1862–1901)		
New Plymouth	✓					(1916–1954)	(1950–1967)	
Palmerston North	✓							
Queenstown	✓							
Rotorua	✓							
Taupō	✓							
Tauranga	✓			✓				
Thames	✓					(1871–1874)		
Timaru	✓							
Tokoroa	✓							
Whanganui	✓		(closed 1932)			(1908–1950)		
Wellington	✓		✓	✓	✓	(1878–1964)	(1949–2017)	
Whangārei	✓							

== History of bus transport in New Zealand ==
Bus transport in New Zealand was initially a free, open, unregulated market with few legal barriers to entry until the Motor-omnibus Act 1926 which introduced the requirement for all bus companies to hold a licence issued by the Licensing Authorities, which set fares, routes and frequencies. This was built on by the Transport Licensing Act 1931 which established district licensing boards to regulate all transport activities not just motor-omnibuses. After 1933, no new licences would be issued for motor-omnibus services except where the market was not served by the railways. This legislation insulated New Zealand Railways and local tramways from competition from the bus.

The New Zealand Railways began acquiring and consolidating bus companies from 1926 into the 1940s under the New Zealand Railways Roads Services. The bus system gradually passed into public ownership and local regulation and governance.

The Muldoon Government liberalised New Zealand land transport in its 1981–1984 term. The Transport Amendment Act 1983 stripped the ability of any government to set fares and operators did not have to demonstrate any need for a service. This removed regulatory barriers to new companies outside the cities.

The Transporting Services Licensing Act 1989 introduced a distinction between commercial services and non-commercial bus services - where any operator believed they could provide a service without any financial contribution from the government. Some municipalities disposed of their incumbent bus operations, but Christchurch, Dunedin, Wellington, and Auckland decided to corporatise their bus services into limited companies and delegate operations and fare-setting for commercial (i.e. unsupported) routes to these companies, but regional councils retained the ability to subsidise and intervene on socially-necessary services.

The New Zealand government began taking control over bus transport in 2008 with the Public Transport Management Act in 2008 which empowered governments to intervene in commercial bus service provision. This was further strengthened in 2013, through the introduction of the concession model, which went under review in 2023.

In 2011/2013 (sources differ), the National government introduced the Public Transport Operating Model (PTOM), with the goal of reducing or eliminating the need for government subsidies for public transport. It stipulated that councils had to allow private companies to bid for operating contracts. In order to be competitive, operators continuously lowered their drivers' wages, eventually leading to a large scale shortage of 800 bus drivers in the country. This resulted in overcrowding on buses and reduced timetables. In 2022 and 2023, governments ended up providing additional subsidies to bring driver wages up to $30 an hour in Canterbury, Otago, and Wellington, and $26 an hour in Auckland, as well as allowing for migrant drivers, in an attempt to recruit more drivers and fill the shortage.

In August 2023, PTOM was eliminated by the government in favour of the Sustainable Public Transport Framework. In a report it was found that PTOM did not actually reduce government subsidies at all, and in some cases government public transport subsidies increased after PTOM's adoption. As PTOM's private operator requirement has been lifted, Wellington's Regional Council has begun planning to take some critical public transport infrastructure, like depots, back into public ownership. National has criticised the new framework as not allowing for a competitive public transport market.

=== Transport authorities ===
- Auckland Transport
- Christchurch Transport Board
- Otago Region (Dunedin and Queenstown)
- Metlink
- Regional governments

The Chatham islands have no regular scheduled public transport on land.

== Funding ==
From 1950 to 1964 urban passenger trips fell from 198 to 127 million a year, which prompted the Carter Report on Urban Transport, published in 1970. The report recommended subsidies to relieve traffic congestion, air pollution and provide for the poor. In 1971, 65 private bus operators lobbied Sir Keith Holyoake to implement its recommendations on capital subsidies. In November 1971 the Ministry of Transport Amendment Act 1971 set up the Urban Passenger Transport Council to give subsidies, and regional councils were also able to use rates. Funding was initially split equally between rail and buses, but later changed to favour buses. From 1989 funding was allocated by Transit New Zealand, until the 1996 Land Transport Management Act transferred it to Transfund New Zealand and the Land Transport Management Act 2003 to the National Land Transport Fund. In 2018-21 NLTF committed $1,231,715,400 to operating costs and $693,188,400 to infrastructure.

== See also ==
- Motu Move
- Rail transport in New Zealand
- Trams in New Zealand
- Transport in New Zealand
