= Foxon (surname) =

Foxon is a surname. The name is of English origin, originating either from meaning "son of Folk", an English given name, or as a variant of Foxton, a locational surname and the name of several places in England. Notable people with the surname include:

- David Foxon (1923–2001), English bibliographer
- Tom Foxon, British physicist
