= Land Transport Management Amendment Act 2008 =

Act of Parliament in New Zealand

New Zealand Parliament
- Long title: The purpose of this Act is to enhance New Zealand's transport planning and funding system established under the Land Transport Management Act 2003.

Legislative history
- Passed: 2008

Related legislation
- Land Transport Management Act 2003
- Status: Current legislation

The New Zealand Land Transport Management Amendment Act 2008 came into force on 1 August 2008.

One of its outcomes was the merging of Transit New Zealand and Land Transport New Zealand to form the NZ Transport Agency.
