= Vehicle registration plates of Samoa =

Samoa
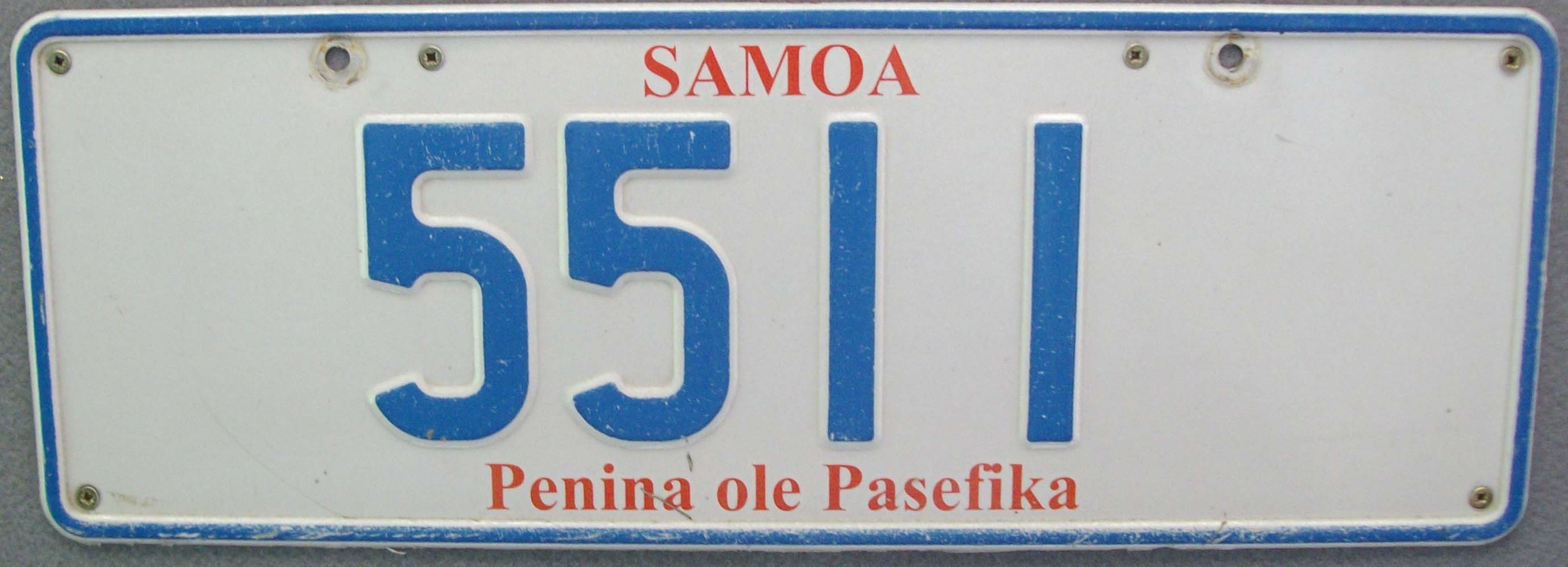
- Country: Samoa
- Country code: WS

Current series
- Slogan: Penina ole Pasefika
- Size: 372 mm × 134 mm 14.6 in × 5.3 in
- Serial format: 1234
- Introduced: 2000; 26 years ago

History
- First issued: 1950; 76 years ago

Samoa requires its residents to register their motor vehicles and display vehicle registration plates. Current plates are Australian standard 372 mm × 134 mm (14.6 in × 5.3 in), and use Australian and New Zealand stamping dies, as zeroes now have a slash through them (e.g. 52Ø9, 128Ø7).

Image	First issued	Design	Slogan	Serial format	Serials issued	Notes
	late 1950s	Green with white numbers	None	123		
	1979	Green background with black numbers	None	1•234		
	1979	Green background with black numbers	None	Govt. 123		Governmental vehicles
	2000	White background with blue numbers	Penina ole Pasefika ("Pearl of the Pacific")	1234		
