= Transfund New Zealand =

Defunct transport funding organisation

- Arataki Aotearoa

Agency overview
- Formed: 1 July 1996
- Preceding agency: Transit New Zealand
- Dissolved: 1 December 2004
- Superseding agency: Land Transport New Zealand
- Jurisdiction: Government of New Zealand
- Headquarters: Wellington, New Zealand
- Parent agency: Ministry of Transport

Transfund New Zealand, often simply referred to as Transfund, was a Crown entity from 1996 to 2004 responsible for transport funding allocation. The organisation was headed by a chief executive who reported to a board, and the board was answerable to the Minister of Transport. Transfund existed for 101 months, was set up under the Fourth National Government of New Zealand, had two ministers under National and then three ministers under Labour, and was disestablished under the Fifth Labour Government of New Zealand. There were three chairpersons of the board, and two permanent plus one acting chief executive. Transfund was merged with the Land Transport Safety Authority and succeeded by Land Transport New Zealand. The outgoing board chair and chief executive were both given the respective position at Land Transport New Zealand.

== Establishment ==
Transfund was set up in 1996 as the Crown's agency to manage the National Roads Fund. The funding of state highways had previously been the responsibility of Transit New Zealand, and it was desired that road funding for Transit NZ and other road controlling authorities (mainly city and district councils) became more equitable. Other functions of Transfund had come across from the Ministry of Transport. Another role of Transfund was to provide state funding for public transport. The enabling legislation for Transfund was the Transit New Zealand Amendment Act 1995, which came into force on 1 July 1996. The Land Transport Safety Authority (LTSA) was established with the same legislation on the same day.

Transfund had its head office in downtown Wellington in BP House located at 20 Customhouse Quay, which was demolished after the 2013 Seddon earthquake.

== Governance and leadership ==
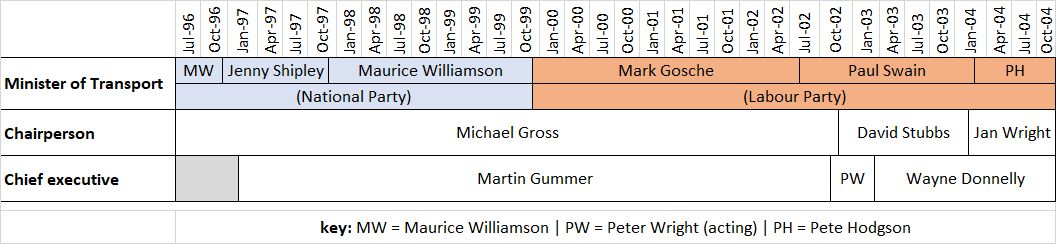
Transfund timeline

At the head of Transfund was a chief executive officer. Governance was provided by a board. The board was answerable to the Minister of Transport.

Michael Gross chaired the Transfund establishment board and, once the organisation was established, chaired its board. Gross was succeeded by David Stubbs as chairperson in late 2002. Early in 2014, Stubbs was promoted to be chairman of Transit New Zealand, and his deputy Jan Wright succeeded him as chairperson in February 2004. Wright was subsequently the inaugural chairperson for Transfund's successor organisation.

Transfund's founding chief executive was Martin Gummer, who started in February 1997 and left in October 2002 to go to the Auckland Regional Transport Network Limited. Peter Wright was acting chief executive until Wayne Donnelly arrived in March 2003. Donnelly went to Transfund's successor organisation as their incumbent chief executive.

== Disestablishment ==
Transport Minister Pete Hodgson reorganised the land transport sector in 2004. Both Transfund and the LTSA had their policy functions transferred to the Ministry of Transport. The operational functions of both organisations were merged into a new organisation named Land Transport New Zealand. The enabling legislation for this merger was the Land Transport Management Amendment Act 2004, which came into force on 1 December 2004.
