= Driving test =

Evaluation of a person's driving skills

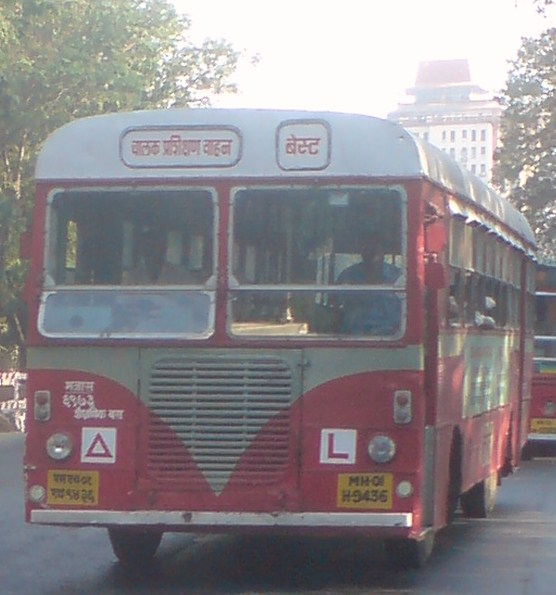
A BEST Bus used for driving tests in Mumbai

A driving test (also known as a driving exam, road test or driver's test in some places) is a procedure to evaluate a person's ability to drive a motor vehicle. It exists in various forms worldwide, and is often a requirement to obtain a license to drive a vehicle independently. A driving test generally consists of one or two parts: the practical test (sometimes called a road test in the United States), used to assess a person's driving ability under normal operating conditions, and a theory test (written, oral or computerized) to confirm a person's knowledge of driving and relevant rules and laws.

The world's first mandatory national driving test was introduced in France in 1899.

To make the test fair, written driving tests are normally standardized tests, meaning that everyone takes the same test under the same conditions. In many places the test can be done by computer, and typically consists of questions related to road signs and traffic laws of the respective country, but may also include questions related to road safety best practices or technical questions regarding vehicle operation and maintenance. In many countries, passing a written driving test is required to be allowed to sit the practical test.

== Test requirements ==
Type of car used on driving exams by country: Candidate's own car Car provided by the driving school, must have dual controls Car provided by the exam center, must have dual controls

Depending on the country and on the driver's license category, the practical test includes driving on public roads as well as different maneuverability tests, which are usually carried out in a controlled environment such as:

- Driving back and forth through a set of traffic cones
- Reversing around a corner or into a parking space
- Emergency stops or evasive maneuvers
- Parallel parking (with a maximum of 2 separate forward movements)
- Reverse angled parking
- Three-point turns (in 3 movements)
- Uphill starts, downhill curbside parking with gear shifts
- Gear shifts when moving off at green lights (manual-transmission only)
- Lane changes
- Entering and leaving intersections (from give-way signs, stop signs, and roundabouts)

Tests for special types of vehicles might have additional requirements, such as:

- Turning and leaving controlled junctions with trailer and/or with an extra one for multi-rig road trains
- Coupling and de-coupling of a trailer to a truck, including establishing the electrical and compressed-air connections and checking them
- Maintaining a motorcycle stable at low speed

Checklist for a driving test in Taiwan

In some countries (Japan, South Korea, Taiwan) maneuverability tests are timed, meaning there is an expected time that a driver has to complete these tasks, so they don't hold up traffic.

In most European Union member countries, the road test may be taken on either a manual or an automatic vehicle, however, when using an automatic vehicle, the driver's license will be restricted to such vehicles. This is also true for New Zealand and Australian road tests. A candidate who passes their test in an automatic may take and pass a second practical test in a manual at a later date to upgrade their license.

Depending on the country, other tests may be required, such as an eyesight test or a reaction test. These may be part of the theory test or the practical test or may be separate tests, in which case they are usually a prerequisite for admission to the practical test. The United Kingdom and some other countries use a Hazard Perception Test as part of the theory test, in which candidates are shown multiple short video clips of driving scenarios and must respond to any emerging hazards.

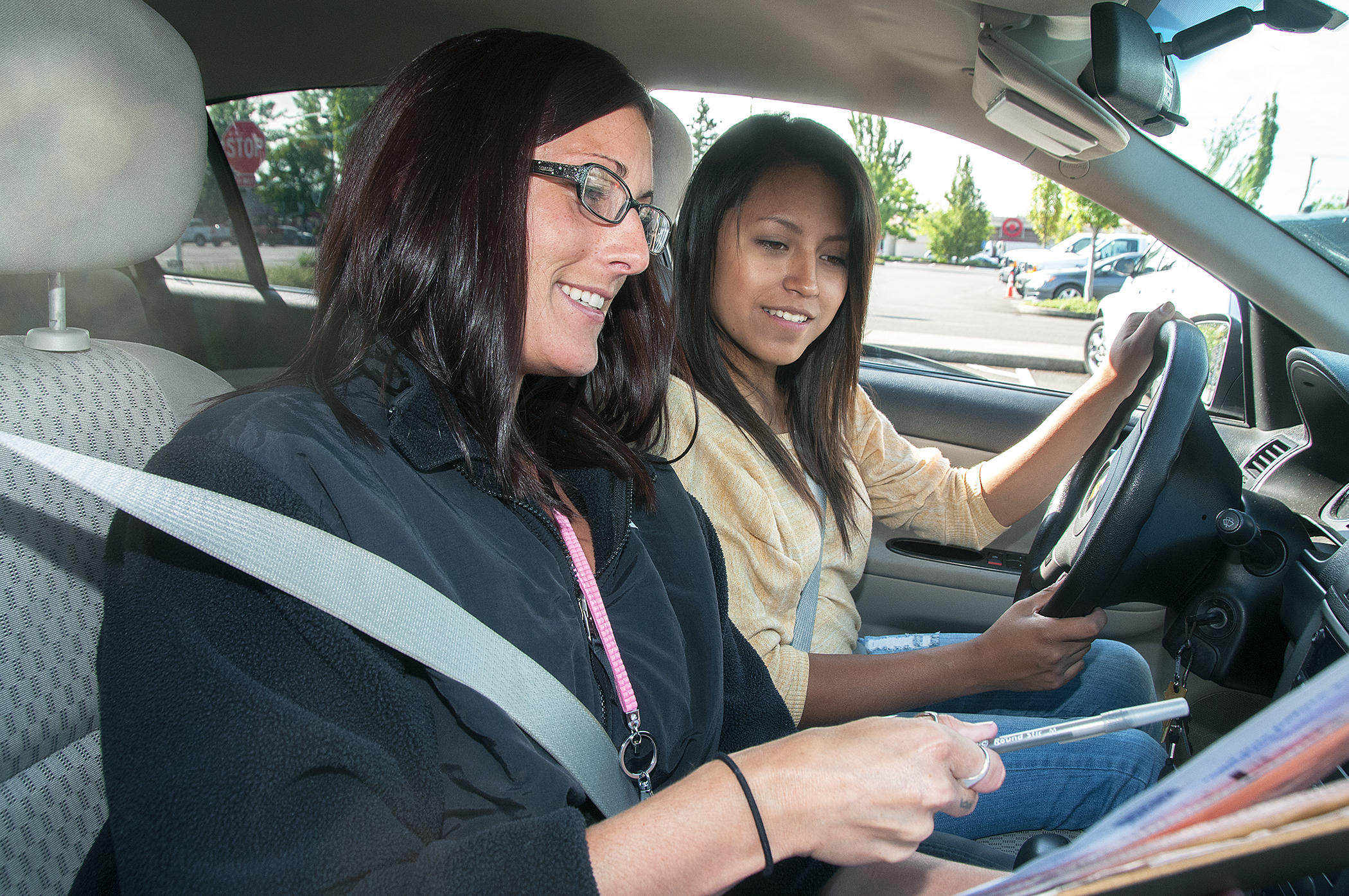
The driving examiner explains the test to the driver.

In the United States, most Department of Motor Vehicles offices do not provide vehicles for the road test and so the person taking the test must provide their own vehicle. This is useful because the vehicle they use for the test is typically the same vehicle they have used to practice driving. Before they can use the vehicle for the test, they must show proof of liability insurance to the DMV for the particular vehicle to avoid liability from a collision that could occur during the test.

In Australia and New Zealand own vehicles must be provided, and the driver must show proof of yearly Warranty of Fitness and registration (at Vehicle Testing New Zealand at the latter) to prove the car's road-worthiness. Only in Northern Territory and New Zealand Automobile Association-affiliated instructors are where driving instructors can become testing officers for official driving tests, but one must not assess their own students, and they will have to drive in the cars of the testing officers, except for truck-licenses (in NT) due to the lack of qualified instructors in the territory. The road test may be taken on either a manual or an automatic vehicle, however, when using an automatic vehicle, the driver's license will be restricted to such vehicles.

In New Zealand, in particular, the driver must pass two driving tests: One for restricted license, for driving independently during 7am-10pm, but supervised outside of those times, or must head home; in the same class and transmission (automatic/manual) as practised, as well as power restrictions if going for a motorbike license. This test assesses maneuverability (reverse parking, 3-point turns (without using driveways in Australia, with in NZ), U-turns and forward square parking (backward and forward square parkings in Australia) and motorway test. The shorter, 45-minute full-license test, taken at at least 6 months after, only tests for hazard detection, give way rules (changed to small corners' pass rule in 2016), road positioning, changing speed limit zones and gap selections in inner city streets.

== See also ==
- Driver's license
