= Land Transport (Clean Vehicle Discount Scheme Repeal) Amendment Act 2023 =

Act of Parliament in New Zealand

New Zealand Parliament
- Royal assent: 19 December 2023

Legislative history
- Introduced by: Simeon Brown
- First reading: 12 December 2023
- Second reading: 12 December 2023
- Third reading: 12 December 2023

Related legislation
- Land Transport Act 1998, Land Transport Management Act 2003
- Status: Current legislation

The Land Transport (Clean Vehicle Discount Scheme Repeal) Amendment Act 2023 is a New Zealand Act of Parliament that amends various legislation to end the Clean Car Discount by 31 December 2023. The Clean Car Discount programme had been introduced by the previous Sixth Labour Government to encourage New Zealand consumers to buy electrical and hybrid vehicles through a tax on high-emissions vehicles such as utes. The Clean Vehicle Discount Scheme Repeal Amendment Act was introduced and passed into law under urgency on 12 December 2023 by the National-led coalition government. It received royal assent on 19 December 2023.

== Key provisions ==
The Bill amends the Land Transport Act 1998, Land Transport Management Act 2003, and several associated regulations including the Land Transport (Motor Vehicle Registration and Licensing) Regulations 2011, Energy Efficiency (Vehicle Energy Economy Labelling) Regulations 2007 and Land Transport (Clean Vehicle Discount Scheme Charges) Regulations 2022 to remove references to the Clean Car Discount programme from New Zealand law.

== Background ==
In mid–June 2021, the Sixth Labour Government announced that it would introduce subsidies to make electric vehicles cheaper while raising the price of new petrol and new diesel vehicles, commencing in July 2021. This policy announcement followed a report by the Climate Change Commission on 9 June 2021 advocating the reduction of farm animal numbers, a ban on new household gas connections by 2025, and a shift to electric vehicles in order to reduce greenhouse emissions. In response to the policy announcement, EV City owner David Boot said that it would boost demand for electric cars while expressing concern about the need for educating electric car users. Motor Trade Association chief executive Craig Pomare claimed that the rebate would not be enough to encourage motor users to make the switch to electric cars while Federated Farmers national president Andrew Hoggard expressed concerns about the lack of electric vehicle alternatives for farmers and tradespersons.

In July 2021, the farming advocacy group Groundswell NZ called for the abolition of the Clean Car rebate scheme, regarding it as a "ute tax". They said there were no electrical alternatives to the utes widely used by farmers, horticulturalists, industry support people, and tradespersons.

The Clean Car Discount was envisioned as financially neutral with the "Ute Tax" charges covering the rebates and administration costs. However, by 2023, the scheme had received more money in rebates than in charges from the "ute tax." By December 2023, the Government had paid out NZ$579 million in rebates and NZ$13.5 million in administrative costs, while the Ute tax charges had only generated NZ$290 million, leaving taxpayers with a deficit of NZ$302.5 million.

During the 2023 New Zealand general election, the opposition National and ACT parties campaigned on repealed the Clean Car Discount, arguing that subsidising the purchase of electric and hybrid vehicles through a "ute tax" of up to NZ$6,900 on utility vehicles was unfair on groups like farmers, who had no viable low-emission alternative to utes. Following the 2023 election, negotiations between the National, ACT and New Zealand First parties led to the formation of a National-led coalition government in late November 2023. On 29 November, the Government released its 100-day plan which included repealing the previous Labour Government's Clean Car discount programme. Scrapping the "Ute tax" and the Clean Car discount was one of the terms of National's coalition agreement with ACT.

== Legislative passage ==
On 14 December 2023, the Government passed the Land Transport (Clean Vehicle Discount Scheme Repeal) Amendment Act 2023 under urgency, which meant that all three readings of the bill were held that day. While the governing National, ACT and NZ First parties supported the Bill, it was opposed by the opposition Labour, Green and Māori parties. As a result, the Clean Car Discount ended on 31 December 2023 after the Bill received royal assent. That same week, the National-led government passed legislation repealing the previous government's dual mandate for the Reserve Bank of New Zealand and Fair Pay Agreements Act 2022.
