= Vehicle registration plates of Niue =

Niue
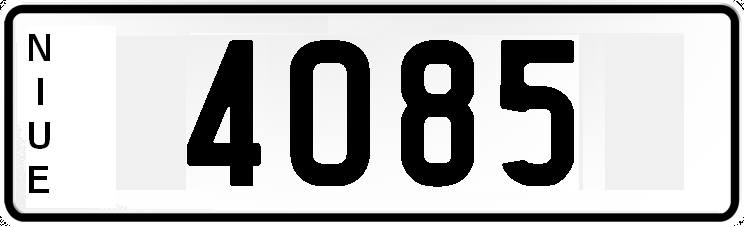
- Country: Niue
- Country code: None

Current series
- Slogan: None
- Size: 372 mm × 134 mm 14.6 in × 5.3 in
- Serial format: 1234

Niue requires its residents to register their motor vehicles and display vehicle registration plates. Current plates are New Zealand standard 360 mm × 125 mm (14.2 in × 4.9 in), smaller in height and width than Australian plates, and use New Zealand stamping dies, as zeroes now have a slash through them (e.g. 52Ø9).

Image	First issued	Design	Slogan	Serial format	Serials issued	Notes
		Black on white	None	1234		
