= Warrant of Fitness =

New Zealand assurance certifying a motor vehicle

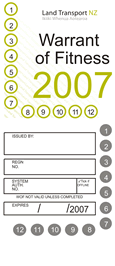
An older Warrant of Fitness certificate issued to vehicles in New Zealand

A Warrant of Fitness (WoF) is an official New Zealand document certifying that a light motor vehicle has passed a compulsory periodic inspection of safety and roadworthiness. The inspection system is administered by the New Zealand Transport Agency (NZTA). Most vehicles with a gross mass under 3,500 kilograms (7,700 lb) that are used on public roads are required to undergo a WoF test, with the frequency depending on the age of the vehicle. New vehicles have a WoF issued at first registration that is valid for four years, then two yearly until the vehicle attains fourteen years of age, then annually thereafter. Currently the vehicle fleet under seven years old is being gradually transitioned onto two yearly WoF inspections when their next inspection is due, with seven to fourteen year old vehicles being eligible from November 1 2027 as a result of legislative changes in 2026, with the exception of motorcycles that must have an annual inspection after four years old. All other vehicles first registered anywhere before November 1 2013 will stay on an annual inspection.

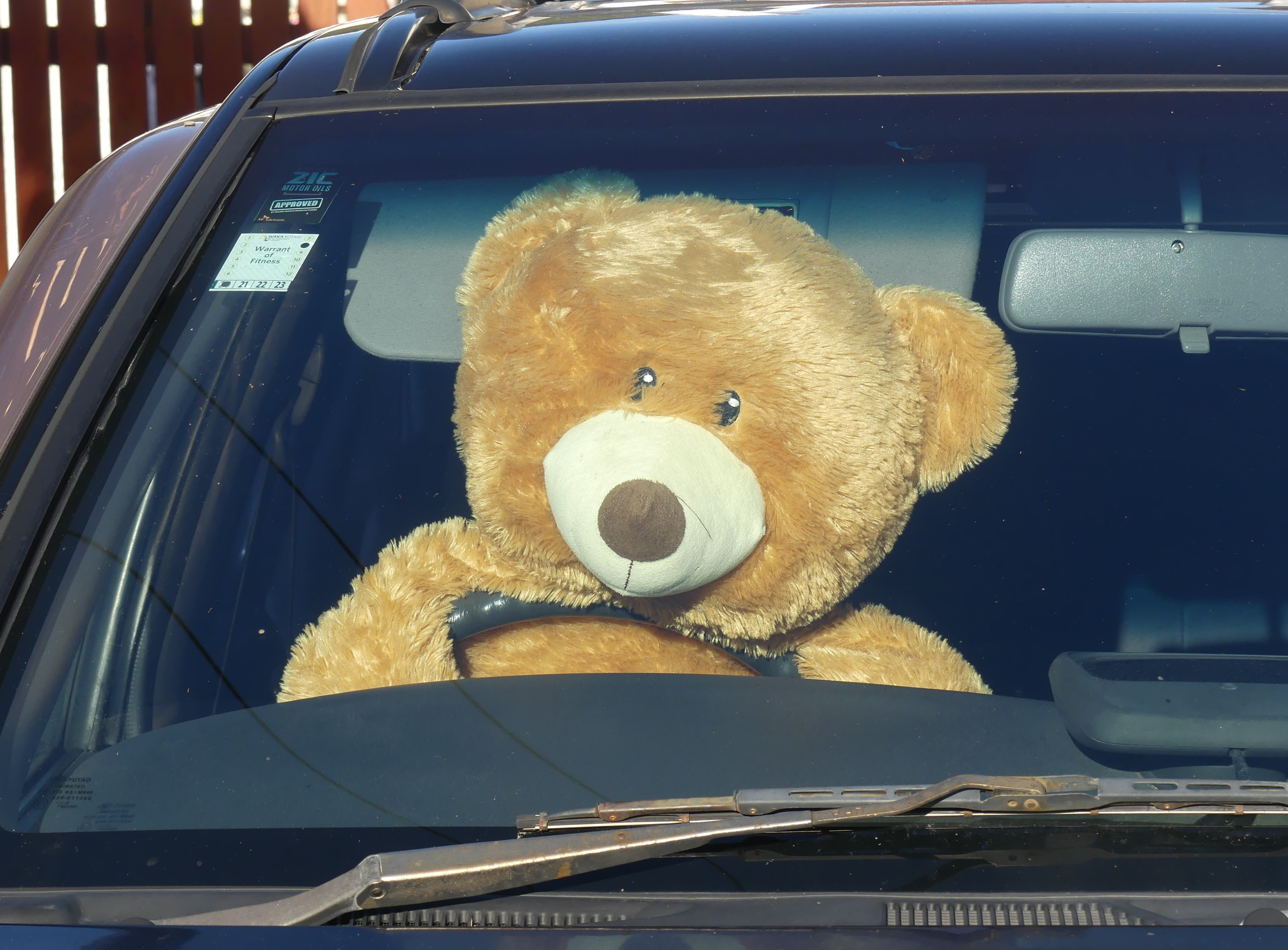
2020 Warrant of Fitness sticker in place on windshield

Vehicles over 3,500 kilograms (7,700 lb), passenger service vehicles (taxis, buses, shuttles, etc.), and rental vehicles do not have a Warrant of Fitness. Instead, these vehicles must possess a Certificate of Fitness (CoF). The CoF test is similar to the WoF test, but must be undergone every six months regardless of the age of the vehicle, unless a different inspection interval has been specified by the Transport Agency, or it is an eligible privately owned motorhome which are on a twelve month CoF. Rental cars registered new in NZ are also on a twelve month CoF.

A WoF test checks tyre condition, brake condition, structural condition, lights, glazing, windscreen wipers and washers, doors, seat belts, airbags (if fitted), driver assist collision avoidance systems (where fitted), speedometer, steering and suspension, exhaust, and fuel system. A vehicle must meet certain criteria in each category to pass the Warrant of Fitness. Many local car repair garages throughout New Zealand are authorised to perform testing and to issue Warrants of Fitness, larger towns and cities usually have one or more independent testing stations who also provide other NZTA services.

Each vehicle used on public roads must display a Warrant of Fitness sticker on the drivers side edge of the windscreen, or in the case of vehicles not fitted with a windscreen, in a convenient location preferably close to the rear number plate. The sticker indicates that the vehicle passed its last WoF inspection, and shows when the next inspection is due. The current stickers display on the outside 2 holes punched, one through a number on the side indicating the month due (e.g. a hole through the number 4 indicates the next test is due in April) and one punched through the number on the bottom indicating the year due (e.g. a hole through the numbers 18 indicates the next test is due in 2018). On the inside, the sticker shows the full date of when the next inspection is due, the vehicle registration number, and the issuing agent stamp.

A vehicle with a current WoF can still be inspected by a police officer and ordered unroadworthy, known as a pink or green sticker, and the vehicle must then be referred to an independent testing station for inspection. If a vehicle lacks a WOF sticker, or its WOF is expired by more than two months, the driver is liable for a NZ$350 fine. Defective or otherwise non compliant wheels and tyres can also attract a NZ$350 fine up to a maximum of NZ$1000 court ordered fine for multiple breaches. If a vehicle is found parked on a public road without a valid WoF sticker, the fine may be also issued by a parking warden.d

== See also ==
- VTNZ (a vehicle inspection company)
