= Vehicle registration plates of the Cook Islands =

The Cook Islands
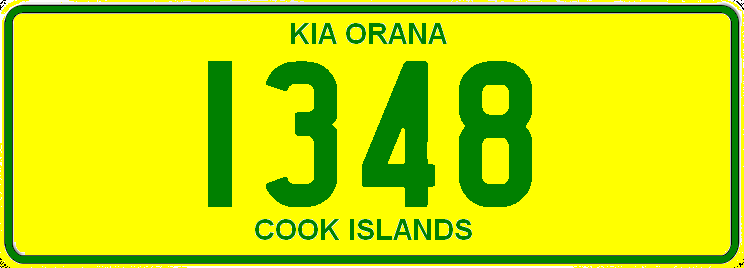
- Country: Cook Islands
- Country code: None

Current series
- Slogan: Kia Orana
- Size: 372 mm × 134 mm 14.6 in × 5.3 in
- Serial format: 1234

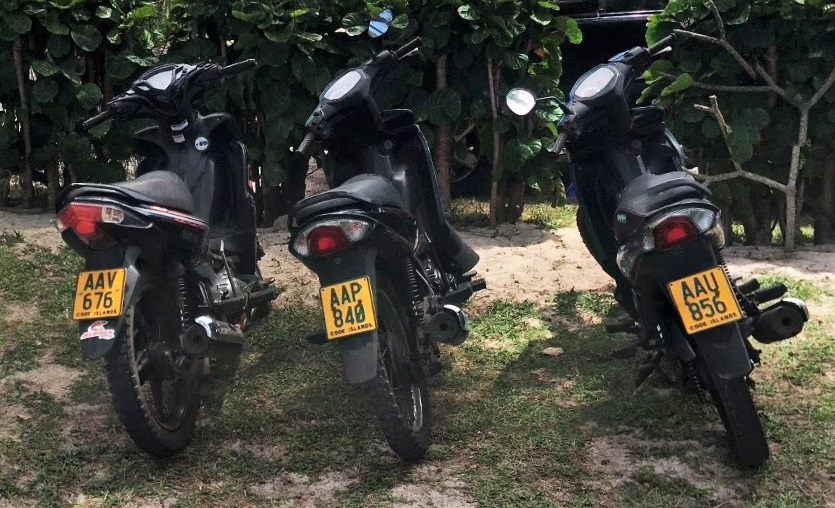
Cook Islands motorcycle license plates

The Cook Islands requires its residents to register their motor vehicles and display vehicle registration plates. Current plates are Australian standard 372 mm × 134 mm (14.6 in × 5.3 in), and use New Zealand stamping dies, as zeroes now have a slash through them (e.g. 52Ø9, 128Ø7).

| Image | First issued | Design | Slogan | Serial format | Serials issued | Notes |
|---|---|---|---|---|---|---|
| | | Green on yellow | Kia Orana | 1234 | | |
