= Land Transport Act 1998 =

Land Transport legislation in New Zealand

New Zealand Parliament
- Long title: An Act— (a) to promote safe road user behaviour and vehicle safety; and (b) to provide for a system of rules governing road user behaviour, the licensing of drivers, and technical aspects of land transport, and to recognise reciprocal obligations of persons involved; and (c) to consolidate and amend various enactments relating to road safety and land transport; and (d) to enable New Zealand to implement international agreements relating to road safety and land transport
- Royal assent: 8 December 1998
- Commenced: 1 March 1999
- Administered by: Ministry of Transport (New Zealand)

Legislative history
- Introduced by: Maurice Williamson
- Introduced: 20 November 1997
- Second reading: 27 November 1997
- Third reading: 03 December 1998
- Status: Current legislation

The Land Transport Act 1998 is an Act of parliament in New Zealand. The act's stated purpose (as per the act contents) is to:

- Promote safe road user behaviour and vehicle safety; and
- Provide for a system of rules governing road user behaviour, the licensing of drivers, and technical aspects of land transport, and to recognise reciprocal obligations of persons involved; and
- Consolidate and amend various enactments relating to road safety and land transport; and
- Enable New Zealand to implement international agreements relating to road safety and land transport.

The act also provides law enforcement agencies such as the New Zealand Police with powers over motor vehicles and drivers. The act describes offences that motorists may commit and details subsequent penalties.
