= NZ Transport Agency Waka Kotahi =

New Zealand Crown entity for land transport

Agency overview
- Formed: 1 August 2008; 18 years ago
- Preceding agencies: Land Transport New Zealand; Transit New Zealand
- Jurisdiction: New Zealand Government
- Headquarters: 44 Bowen Street, Wellington
- Employees: 2,081
- Minister responsible: Chris Bishop, Minister of Transport
- Agency executives: Simon Bridges, Chair; Brett Gliddon, Chief executive
- Website: www.nzta.govt.nz

NZ Transport Agency Waka Kotahi (NZTA) is a New Zealand Crown entity tasked with promoting safe and functional transport by land, including the responsibility for driver and vehicle licensing, and administering the New Zealand state highway network. Waka Kotahi means 'one vessel' and is intended to convey the concept of "travelling together as one".

== History and leadership ==
=== Formation ===
The agency was established on 1 August 2008 by the Land Transport Management Amendment Act 2008, merging Transit New Zealand with Land Transport New Zealand.

=== Leadership changes, 2008–2019 ===
NZTA's board was criticised by the National Party-led opposition in July 2008 as being "stacked" with political appointees of the Labour Party-led government. A National Party-led government was formed after 2008 New Zealand general election, and a number of board members were reappointed or replaced.

In January 2019, three members of the board of directors resigned, about six weeks after the resignation of chief executive Fergus Gammie. They were Adrienne Young-Cooper, Chris Ellis and Fran Wilde. Minister of Transport Phil Twyford said the agency had been "going through a massive change process", with its compliance work in the issuing of vehicle Warrant of Fitnesses under review.

Mark Ratcliffe, former head of telco Chorus, was appointed interim chief executive. Nicole Rosie, former CE of WorkSafe New Zealand, replaced him as chief executive mid-February 2020.

On 26 April 2019, chairman Michael Stiassny announced his resignation. On 11 June 2019, Brian Roche commenced his second term as chairman of NZTA; Roche had previously been the inaugural chairman from 2008.

=== Waka Kotahi, 2019–2023 ===
In August 2019, Waka Kotahi changed the order of its name to emphasise its Māori language name "Waka Kotahi." The logo was also changed to reflect this change of order.

Kane Patena was appointed the first Director of Land Transport for Waka Kotahi from 1 April 2021.

In early November 2023, Waka Kotahi suspended its NZ$305 million Transport Choices Programme where local councils would receive funding to encourage walking, cycling and public transportation. Waka Kotahi suspended this programme amidst coalition talks to form the National-led coalition government following the 2023 New Zealand general election.

=== Reversion to NZTA, 2023–present ===
In December 2023, the New Zealand Minister of Transport Simeon Brown ordered that the agency was to give primacy to its English name.

In mid-December 2023, Transport Minister Brown ordered the NZTA to halt funding and work on various local council projects to promote cycling, walking and public transportation. Notable projects affected by the Government's transportation policy change included the "Let's Get Wellington Moving" programme.

On 11 March 2024, Simon Bridges was appointed a member and chairperson of the NZTA board for a three-year term.

On 15 May, RNZ reported that NZTA had paid consultant PwC to design two new vehicle-spotting technologies at a cost of NZ$130 million only to abandon the project after the technologies were found not to work.

On 16 May 2024, NZTA confirmed that it would slash over 120 jobs as part of government cutbacks. 109 of the affected roles came from the former Clean Car Discount, Climate Emergency Response Fund, and Let's Get Wellington Moving projects, which had been cancelled by the National-led coalition government. In early May 2024, NZTA also announced it would cut another 12 roles from its Customer and Services and Digital teams to meet the Government's 7.5% cost cutting target.

== Public data access ==
NZTA stores registration, licensing and warrant of fitness details for any road-registered vehicle within New Zealand, including cars, motorbikes, trailers, trucks and earthmoving or agricultural machinery. Any member of the public can query NZTA's database by making a request using the licence plate or VIN at an NZ Post outlet, or by using a vehicle checking website.

== Road signage ==
Road signs in New Zealand fall under the authority of NZTA and are prescribed in the Traffic Control Devices (TCD) Manual.
