= Three-point turn =

Method of turning vehicles around in a limited space

Performing a three-point turn (shown for right-hand traffic)

The three-point turn (sometimes called a Y-turn, K-turn, or broken U-turn) is the standard method of turning a vehicle around to face the opposite direction in a limited space, using forward and reverse gears. This is typically done when the road is too narrow for a U-turn, and there are no driveways or sideroads that are conducive to a two-point turn. Three-point turns are dangerous because they make the driver vulnerable to oncoming traffic for an extended period of time. For this reason, they are generally recommended to be used only as a last resort. This manoeuvre is a common requirement in driving tests.

== Process ==
The basic manoeuvre consists of driving across the road turning towards the offside kerb, reversing across the road to the original nearside kerb while turning, and driving forward towards the original offside kerb, now the nearside. In a narrow road or with a longer vehicle, more than three legs may be required to achieve a full 180 degree rotation.

== Naming ==
"Three point turn" is the most common name in Australia, Canada, New Zealand, the United Kingdom and many regions of the United States. Less common terms are: "Y-turn", "K-turn", and Broken U-turn In the UK the official name is "Turning in the road (using forward and reverse gears)", and in Ireland it is called a "turnabout", because an acceptable turn may include more than three points.
