= Tom Foxon =

British physicist

Tom Charles Bayley Foxon is a British physicist who is an emeritus professor at the University of Nottingham.
