= Foxton, County Durham =

Village in County Durham, England

Coordinates: 54°37′03″N 1°26′21″W

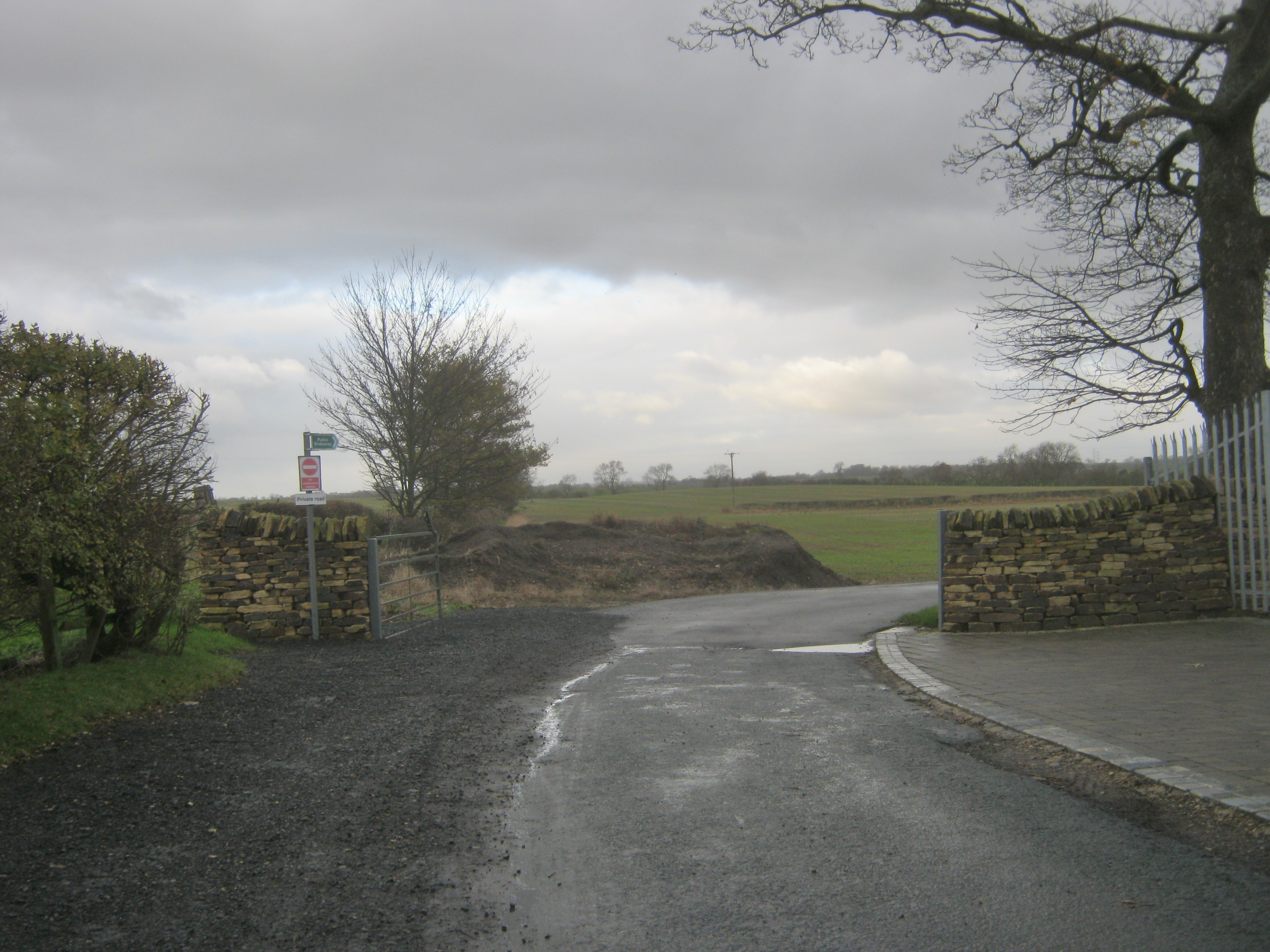
Road at Foxton

Foxton is a small village in County Durham, England. It is situated to the north-west of Stockton-on-Tees, near Stillington.

The origin of the place-name is from the Old English words fox and denu meaning valley frequented by foxes. The place-name appeared as Foxedene in c. 1170.
