= VTNZ =

Vehicle Testing New Zealand
- Founded: 1994
- Key people: Greg O'Connor, Country Manager
- Owner: DEKRA
- Website: www.vtnz.co.nz

Vehicle Testing New Zealand Limited (VTNZ) is a company based in Wellington, New Zealand, that carries out government-mandated Warrant of Fitness and other inspections of motor vehicles. It is the largest vehicle inspection company in New Zealand.

VTNZ was founded in 1994 as Vehicle Testing New Zealand and was a New Zealand state-owned enterprise. In 1999, it was privatised and sold to the Motor Transport Association (MTA) for NZ$19.2 million. In 2004, the company rebranded itself as VTNZ and purchased its principal competitor On Road New Zealand.

In 2011, VTNZ had over 85 vehicle testing stations across New Zealand and employed nearly 1000 people. Some stations also act as government agents in processing driver licence and vehicle registration applications. In 2010, VTNZ also entered New Zealand's roadside assistance market.

In 2013, MTA announced that German based company DEKRA would purchase 60 percent of VTNZ for NZ$36 million. Following the purchase, VTNZ began offering a wider range of services, including vehicle servicing.

In 2014, VTNZ took over practical driver testing in New Zealand. VTNZ has been a three-time winner of the IBM Kenexa Best Workplaces Award for Enterprise category (2014–2016).

In 2021, it was reported that 8 cars had been stolen over the last 25 years from testing stations. The most recent case was of a Mazda worth NZ$15,000 which was stolen while the inspector returned to the office to write the WOF sticker while leaving the keys in the car.
