= Foxton =

Foxton may refer to:

== Places ==
New Zealand

- Foxton, New Zealand, in the North Island
  - Foxton Fizz, soft drink
- Foxton (New Zealand electorate), a former parliamentary electorate, 1881–1890
- Foxton Beach, North Island

United Kingdom

- Foxton, Cambridgeshire, England
- Foxton, County Durham, England
- Foxton, Leicestershire, England
- Foxton, North Yorkshire, England
- Foxton Locks, on the Grand Union Canal, in Leicestershire, England

United States

- Foxton, Colorado

== People ==
- Bruce Foxton (born 1955), British musician
- David Foxton (born 1965), British judge
- John Foxton (1769–1829), British hangman
- Justin Foxton (1849–1916), Australian politician
- Richard Foxton (died 1649), British MP

== See also ==
- Foxtons, estate agent based in London
