= Transit New Zealand =

Government agency for state roads, 1989–2008

Agency overview
- Formed: 1 October 1989
- Preceding agencies: National Roads Board; Main Highways Board
- Dissolved: 31 July 2008
- Superseding agency: NZ Transport Agency
- Jurisdiction: New Zealand government
- Headquarters: Formerly: Level 2 Victoria Arcade 42-44 Victoria Street Wellington New Zealand
- Employees: 450 (2008)
- Annual budget: Over $1 billion NZD (2008)
- Ministers responsible: Annette King, Minister of Transport; Judith Tizard, Associate Minister of Transport
- Agency executives: Bryan Jackson, JP, Acting Chairperson; Rick van Barneveld, Chief Executive
- Parent agency: Ministry of Transport
- Website: www.transit.govt.nz

Transit New Zealand (Māori: Ararau Aotearoa), which existed from 1989 to 2008, was the New Zealand Crown entity responsible for operating and planning the New Zealand state highway network (10,894 km, about 12% of New Zealand's roads). It also concerned itself with developments close to state highways, as it considered the potential additional traffic that these would create, and it was responsible for state highway landscaping.

Transit New Zealand was merged with Land Transport New Zealand to form the NZ Transport Agency (NZTA) on 1 August 2008. Transit's website was still active up to 9 December 2009, when the new NZTA website was launched with streamlined information from the Transit website.

== Structure ==
Transit had an annual operating budget of over NZ$1 billion and about 450 staff, with much of its actual planning and design work contracted out to construction companies and consultancies. Almost all of its funding was approved by the government's land transport funding agency Land Transport New Zealand through the National Land Transport Programme. Until 1996, Transit approved subsidies for passenger transport services contracted by regional councils, before this was devolved to Transfund and then Land Transport New Zealand (now NZTA).

However, the government proposed that Land Transport New Zealand and Transit New Zealand be merged again, with some functions devolved to the Ministry of Transport. This eventually took place in 2008, creating the NZTA.

== History ==
Transit New Zealand was the successor to similar previous entities. The Main Highways Board, created on 1 April 1924, to facilitate the overall planning and control of roads on a national basis, especially arterial routes, under the control of the Public Works Department. Initially it divided the country into 18 highway districts. After World War II, the National Roads Board was formed. During this time, deferred maintenance and a great need for bridge works were complicated by a lack of manpower, plant and materials at a time when traffic volumes rose steeply and rural areas were opened up to road traffic.

During the economic reforms of the 1980s direct Government control of service provision was reduced, and new methods of providing for roads were developed. On 1 April 1988, the Ministry of Works and Development was corporatised and the National Roads Board's operational arm, the Roading Division, was incorporated into the Ministry of Transport. On 1 October 1989 it became Transit New Zealand.

The agency also came under some criticism for being 'anti-development'. It often lodged objections to resource consent applications which in its opinion created safety or capacity problems on close-by motorways (such as large retail developments like Sylvia Park) or required substantial consultation and mitigating measures for them before they were allowed to go ahead. Rodney District Council once threatened court action, alleging that the agency was effectively preventing any substantial development within its area.
