= Land Transport New Zealand =

Defunct New Zealand government agency

- Ikiiki Whenua Aotearoa

Agency overview
- Formed: 1 December 2004
- Preceding agencies: Land Transport Safety Authority; Transfund New Zealand
- Dissolved: 31 July 2008
- Superseding agency: NZ Transport Agency
- Jurisdiction: New Zealand government
- Headquarters: Wellington, New Zealand
- Employees: ~1,000
- Annual budget: $2.7 billion (2009)
- Minister responsible: Steven Joyce, Minister of Transport
- Agency executives: Paul Fitzharris, Acting Chair; Wayne Donnelly, Chief Executive
- Parent agency: Ministry of Transport
- Website: www.landtransport.govt.nz

Land Transport New Zealand was a Crown entity in New Zealand, tasked with promoting safe and functional transport by land, and includes responsibilities such as driver and vehicle licensing. It was created on 1 December 2004 by the Land Transport Management Amendment Act 2004, was the successor entity to the disestablished Land Transport Safety Authority and Transfund New Zealand, and was disestablished from 31 July 2008, merging with Transit New Zealand to become the NZ Transport Agency.
