= Vehicle registration plates of New Zealand =

New Zealand
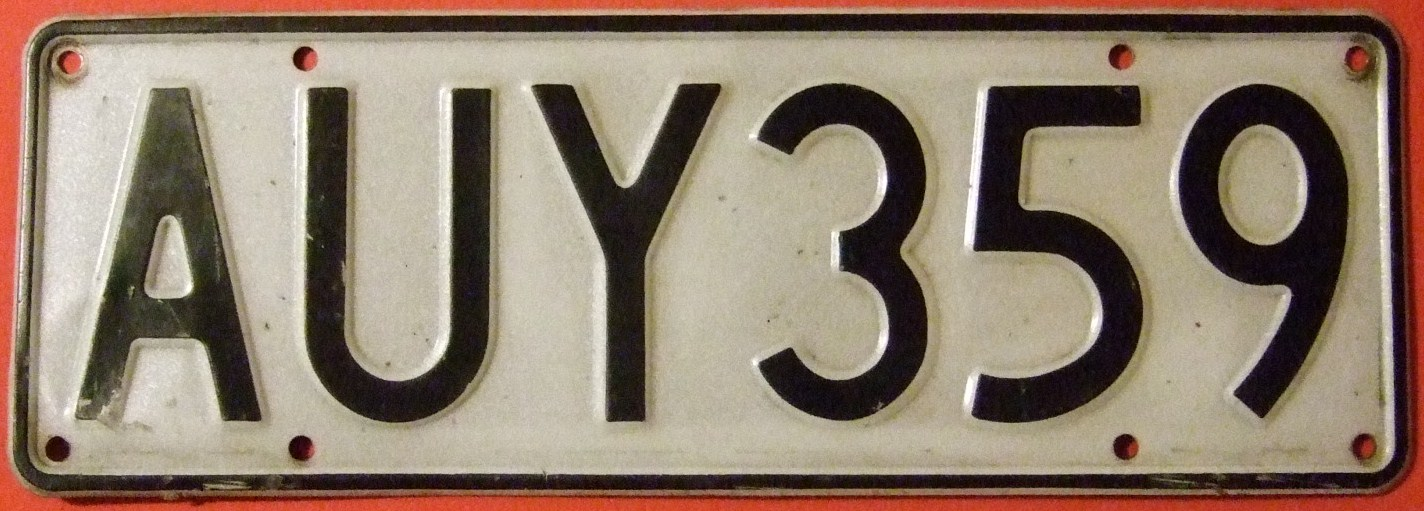
- Current regular legal standard number plate New Zealand.
- Country: New Zealand
- Country code: NZ

Current series
- Size: 360 mm × 124 mm 14.2 in × 4.9 in
- Serial format: Not standard
- Colour (front): Black on white
- Colour (rear): Black on white

In New Zealand, vehicle registration plates (usually called number plates) contain up to six alphanumeric characters, depending on the type of vehicle and the date of registration. To be operated on (or parked on) any public road, most types of motor vehicles and trailers must be registered and display the corresponding registration plate(s). One plate must be affixed to the rear of the vehicle, and except in the case of a motorcycle, moped, tractor, or trailer, a second plate must be affixed to the front of the vehicle.

If the visibility of a regular number plate is obstructed, for example by a bike rack mounted to a car's trailer hitch, a supplementary plate with the same registration number must be obtained and affixed to the obstruction (or the vehicle) such that it will be visible from the same direction as the regular number plate would have been.

== Standard numbering sequences ==
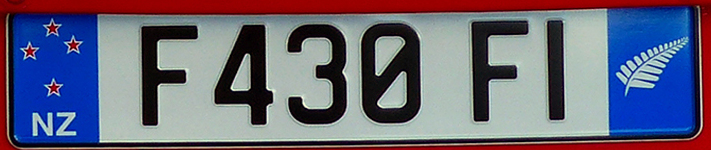
A vehicle registration plate of New Zealand in the optional 'Europlate' style

=== Cars and heavy vehicles ===
- 1964–1987: AAnnnn
- 1987–2001: AAnnnn
- 2001–present: AAAnnn

Private cars, taxis, and heavier road vehicles in New Zealand have number plates with up to six characters. From 1964 until March 2001 these number plates had two letters followed by one to four numbers (format LLnnnn), the sequence having started with AA1 and continuing through to ZZ9989 chronologically (for example, XE3782 would have been issued in 1998). An observer can therefore ascertain the approximate date of the first registration of a vehicle using the number plate.

By the end of 2000, this system had reached the end of the alphabet (ZZ). The series officially ended with plate ZZ9989 – the sequence ZZ9990 to ZZ9999 had appeared as personalized plates years earlier. A new system began in April 2001, with three letters (starting with AAA) followed by three numbers starting at 100. Land Transport New Zealand also issued AAA100 to AAA103 as personalized plates, officially meaning that the first plate in the new series read AAA104.

Starting with CEA, the number ranges started with 1, as in the old system. The authorities issued this series according to the first two letters – the third letter and numbers did not necessarily get issued in sequence. The current AAA111 combination is estimated by the NZTA to be exhausted by 2037, when it reaches ZZZ999.

Unlike in many countries, observers cannot normally identify a location of registration by simply looking at the number plate. One exception to this rule occurred when Ln plates first appeared in 1964: most plates went to the regions in batches, starting with the AA series in Southland and moving progressively north. For some time one could reasonably infer that an AF plate hailed from Dunedin, an AI plate from South Canterbury, and so on. In some later instances issuers coded plates to the area of registration, such as in 1966 with the allocation of plates beginning with CE to the Manawatu-Wanganui region, in 1974–1976 with the allocation of plates beginning with HB to the Hawke's Bay region, in May 1989 with the allocation of plates beginning with OG to Wellington region, and in July 2000 with the allocation of plates beginning with ZI to Auckland region.

=== Motorcycles and tractors ===
These vehicles use one of several five-character systems. Since 2009 the system has consisted of one letter, followed by one number followed by three letters; for example A2ATL.

The previous system consisted of one or two numbers followed by three letters. The system incremented the number sequence first, so after plate 12ABC came 13ABC, and 99ABC preceded 1ABD. In July 2009, these plates had reached the ZUU range.

=== Caravans and trailers ===
As of 2025, caravan and trailer number plates have the format nLLnn (1AB12, introduced in 2024). The previous formats were, in order: (LnnnL A123A, introduced in 2002), (nLnnn 1A123, introduced in 2014), (nnLnn 12A12, introduced in 2019), and (nnnLn 123A1, introduced in 2021).

Two older formats are the Lnnnn format and the nnnnL format which were issued on black-on-white and silver-on-black plates (e.g. 1234A, A1234). Some black-on-white plates issued in 2002 have the format nnnAL (excluding W, Y and Z as the second letter) (e.g. 123AA), in preparation of the new LnnnL format launched later that year. Also, silver-on-black plates were issued to trailers with motorcycle plates before the RNA range in 1990.

=== Dealer/trade plates ===
Xnnnn

nnnnX

Businesses involved in the sale, manufacturing, repair and maintenance of vehicles may obtain a trade plate (also known as a dealer plate). As of 2026, these plates are black characters on a yellow, reflective background. They begin or end with the letter 'X' in addition to four numerals, and are valid until 31 December of the year shown on the plate. These plates are available for vehicles under and over 3500kg, standard and heavy trailers and motorcycles and mopeds.

== History ==
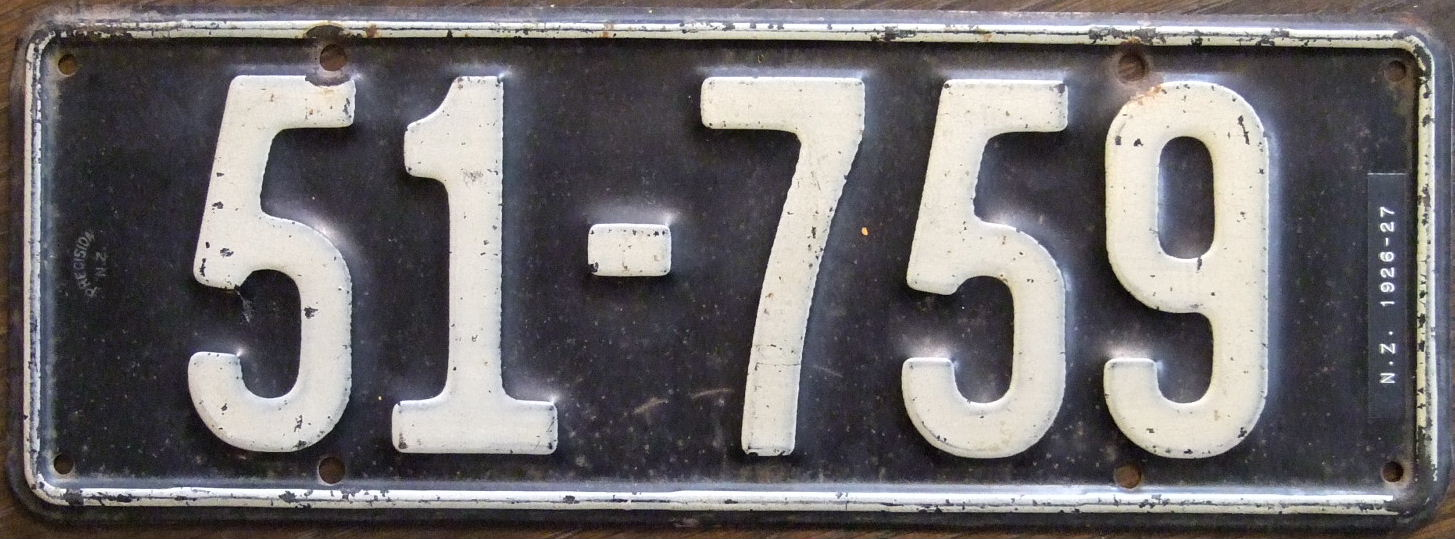
1926 national number plate

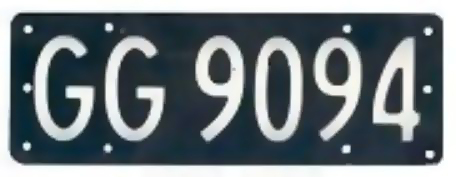
Old New Zealand silver-on-black plate, issued in 1973

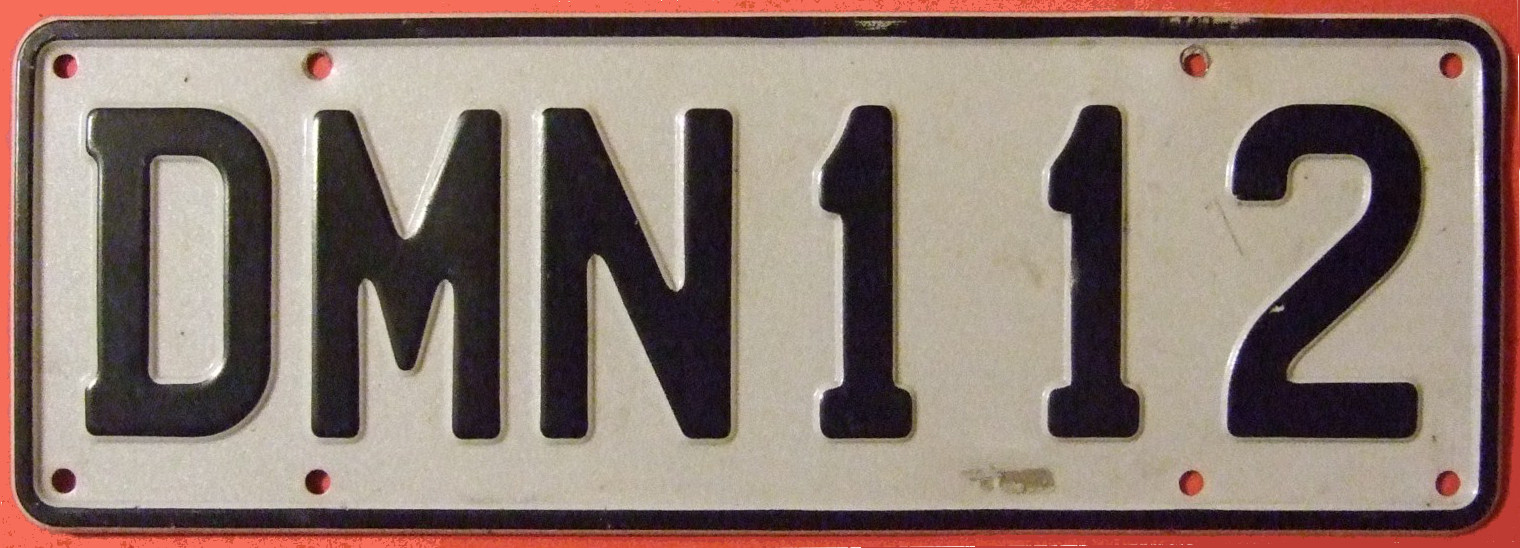
Current New Zealand black-on-white plate, issued in 2006

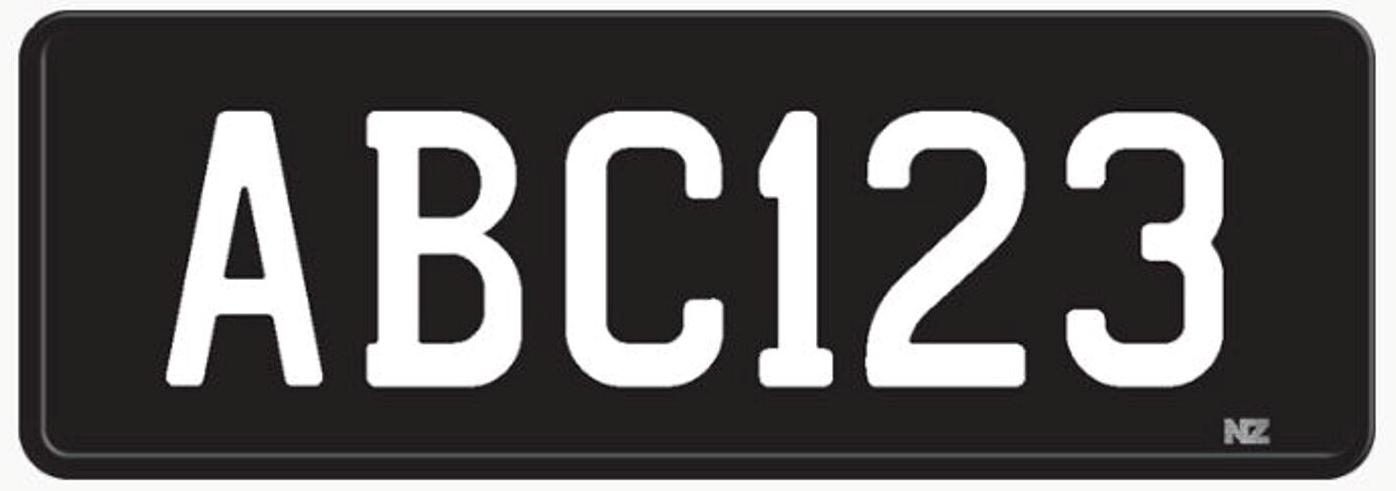
New white-on-black number plate example, launched in 2022

Before 1925 vehicle registration took place on a regional rather than on a country-wide basis. Vehicles displayed their registration numbers on the right-hand side of the vehicle, often painted on. From 1925, the authorities issued steel plates to vehicle-owners annually. The first plates were United States-made green with white numbers prefixed with NZ (nnn-nnn). The 1926–1927 year was black with white numbers with the following plates black with orange numbers (nnn*nnn). This system changed when steel supplies became limited during World War II: from 1941 plates remained valid for five years.

In 1961, the last non-permanent plates were issued. They were yellow with black numbers in the format nnn•nnn. Plates were issued in numerical order starting from Wellington and progressing up the North Island to Whangarei, before jumping to Blenheim and progressing down the South Island to Invercargill.

1961 plate distribution
Area	From	To	Total plates
Whangarei	422•601	441•700	19,100
Auckland	302•601	422•600	120,000
Thames	273•101	302•600	29,500
Hamilton	208•901; 238•001	236•999; 273•100	63,199
Gisborne	195•001	208•000	13,000
Napier	165•501	195•000	29,500
New Plymouth	136•001	165•500	29,500
Wanganui	116•001	136•000	20,000
Palmerston North	80•501	116•000	33,500
Masterton	70•001	80•500	10,500
Wellington	10•001	70•000	60,000
Blenheim	600•001	607•800	7,800
Nelson	607•801	622•400	14,600
Westport	622•401	624•400	2,000
Greymouth	624•401	630•500	6,100
Christchurch	630•501	710•500	80,000
Timaru	710•501	726•400	15,900
Oamaru	726•401	733•000	6,600
Dunedin	733•001	771•000	38,000
Invercargill	771•001	802•500	31,500

Issuance of permanent registration plates commenced in 1964. These new plates were made of aluminium and had silver serials on a black background. Serials consisted of two letters and up to four numbers, and were issued sequentially, the first serial being AA100. Certain two-letter series were banned or reserved for government or diplomatic use, while use of the letter V was discontinued after 1971 and later, Q was not used as the first letter (see Exceptions below).

In November 1986, the plate design officially changed to black serials on a reflectorised white background, following a trial run some weeks earlier. The first official plate of this design had the serial MX100. Silver-on-black plates remain valid and in use, and it is possible to buy a pre-1987 used car with such plates, as vehicle owners in New Zealand do not have to change plates when ownership of a vehicle changes. However, black-on-white plates may be used to replace silver-on-black plates that are irreparably damaged. The serial font initially remained unchanged following the design change. In mid-1990, a slash was added to the zero character; the first plate to feature a slashed zero had the serial PC10.

In September 2022, Kiwi Plates (the only company authorised to produce New Zealand number plates) announced the relaunch of black number plates. After extensive work with Waka Kotahi and the New Zealand Police to ensure the plates were compatible with traffic and toll cameras, the new plates were approved with black backgrounds and an option of silver or white lettering. All new black plates include an 'NZ' hologram to allow officers to confirm validity on the road.

Plates used sans-serif lettering until the letter code DFN (March 2006). Plates since then use a thicker-lined partially-seriffed font based on FE-Schrift. The authorities introduced the new font in order to foil attempts to cut out letters and put them back in upside-down when forging licence plates.

== Design ==
Most plates come in rectangular form with all the characters of the serial on a single horizontal line. Plates for motorcycles may split the serial between two horizontal lines, or may be a smaller version of the car plate. Plates on the front mudguards of motorcycles can take the overall form of an arc, although this form is no longer issued. All plates consist of a pressed aluminium plate with the characters and a surrounding border embossed, rather than printed. Only plates issued by Waka Kotahi NZ Transport Agency and its agents are legal. Plates purchased anywhere else are unacceptable.

Later plates with a white background may feature a holographic pattern on the white field, observed from the XD series of serials onwards. This design, visible only from certain angles and under appropriate lighting conditions, displays strips of silver roundels with a stylised silver fern pattern in silhouette.

Newly launched black number plates feature a black background with white or silver lettering. Unlike white plates, these do not feature a holographic pattern on the background field, and instead use a small 'NZ' logo at the bottom righthand corner to confirm validity.

The alphanumeric characters on current standard car plates measure 78 mm tall by 45 mm wide. The previous series of black on white plates (superseded in 2006) and the earlier silver on black plates shared the same font, with characters that were 84 mm tall by 48 mm wide.

== Exceptions ==
The registration system avoids several combinations of letters.

In the two-letter serial format, use of the letter V was discontinued following the FV series in 1971, as it could be easily confused with the letter U. The letter Q was not used as the first letter (the RA series thus followed the PZ series in 1991), although it was used as the second letter.

The MN series was skipped in 1985 as it was reserved for the Cook Islands. Other two-letter series skipped include BO, FA, FO, FU, II, and IO.

From late 1996 until the end of the two-letter format in April 2001, each series (with three exceptions) started from 1000 instead of from 1, meaning that serials were strictly six characters in length. The UR series was the first such series; the three exceptions were the WS, WT and WU series. The strict use of six-character serials continued into the three-letter format, with each series starting from 100, up to and including the CDZ series in 2004.

The LLnnnn system deliberately reserved plates starting with the combinations CC, DC and FC for diplomatic vehicles. DC plates are registered to vehicles owned by foreign embassies and high commissions in Wellington, CC plates are registered to vehicles owned by foreign consulates in Auckland and Christchurch, and FC plates are registered to vehicles owned by foreign ambassadors and their family members. Mayoral and ministerial vehicles used the prefix CR (Crown). The Prime Minister receives plate CR1 while plate DC1 is reserved for the British High Commissioner to New Zealand.

As the official representative of the monarch in New Zealand, the Governor General's primary vehicle carries no number plate but instead displays the royal crown. It is the only standard car permitted to operate on New Zealand roads without a number plate. However, in the NZTA System, the combination CROWN is used, and was issued in 1986, predating all other personalised plates by two years.

Since the change to the LLLnnn format, the letters I, O and X have appeared only on plates starting with AAI, AAO, and AAX respectively; presumably the potential for confusing these letters with numbers and other similar looking letters was only realised after those initial series. Current plates eschew the letters I, O, V, and X, meaning that letter sequences skip straight from HZZ to JAA and NZZ to PAA.

A number of three-letter combinations have been skipped, mainly to avoid offence. These include: FAG, FKN, FUC, FUK, FUQ, KGB, KKK, KUM and NGA. Despite possible negative connotations, the FTP and GAY combinations were issued during 2011 and NGR in 2021.

Some MG models featured plates with serials in the MG series, used as semi-personalised plates, in advance of the official MG release. The full BMW series has been bought up by BMW dealers for similar use, while some Hyundai and Kia cars feature plates with serials in the HYU and KIA series respectively.

Serials in the CCC and DCC series have been reserved, presumably for diplomatic vehicles. The combinations EBA, FCC, FNA–FNZ, G(A–H)A, MMM, NWA, PCP, PDW, PFZ, PGF, PGR, PHN, PQW, PSD, and PUB were also excluded.

In May 2019, after the Christchurch mosque shootings, the NZTA offered to replace any plates in the GUN series (issued in 2013) on request, although the series was not withdrawn.

== Plate series with approximate year issued ==
1964–1969	Series AA to EZ were issued between 1964 and 1969 not just to new vehicles but also to replace all pre-permanent plates registered at the time; they were not necessarily issued in sequence.
1969	FB FD FE

General issue combinations at the start of each year, 1970–present (cars and trucks)
1970	1971	1972	1973	1974	1975	1976	1977	1978	1979
FF 1	FN 1	FX 1	GG 1	GW 1	HB 1	HO 1	IE 1	IQ 1	JC 1
1980	1981	1982	1983	1984	1985	1986	1987	1988	1989
JH 1	JY 1	KJ 1	KU 1	LO 1	LZ 1	MI 1	NA 1	NO 1	OC 1
1990	1991	1992	1993	1994	1995	1996	1997	1998	1999
OR 1	PM 1	RE1	RS1	SG1	TB1	TU1	UU1000	WT1	XR1000
2000	2001	2002	2003	2004	2005	2006	2007	2008	2009
YT1000	ZW1000	AKL100	BAL100	BST100	CKZ1	DDA1	DRH1	EHD1	EUF1
2010	2011	2012	2013	2014	2015	2016	2017	2018	2019
FGA1	FTA1	GEL1	GRP1	HFF1	HWS1	JNS1	KHH1	LDC1	LYE1
2020	2021	2022	2023	2024	2025	2026	2027	2028	2029
MQQ1	NFU1	NZU1	PRR1	QKB1	RAH1	RPJ1			
2030	2031	2032	2033	2034	2035	2036	2037	2038	2039

== Commemorative plates ==
In general, numbers in the systems do not have leading zeroes, starting with 1000 in the LLnnnn system and 100 and later 1 in the LLLnnn system. A commemorative series of plates celebrating New Zealand's national rugby union team, the All Blacks, follows the LLnnnn system but with a leading zero after the letters AB, giving them the format AB0nnn.

In 1990 a special series of commemorative plates marked the country's sesquicentenary. These had the format nnnnNZ, with the lettering in red on white.

== Personalised plates ==
Rights to unique combinations of up to six characters can be purchased from a private company licensed by the NZ Transport Agency. The purchaser may acquire any unique combination that falls outside the standard numbering sequences (apart from derogatory, obscene, profane or intentionally confusing combinations, or if they promote violence, discrimination or bias) or standard numbers that have fallen into disuse. New Zealand does not require associating the plate with a vehicle, and allows outright sale rather than just a periodic lease.

Although plate character/number combinations can contain "spaces", they do not form part of the unique identification and are typically not stored (for example, in Police computer-systems). Therefore, if a personalised plate such as I A I exists an owner cannot purchase a combination such as IAI, and vice versa.

The most sought-after combinations available as personalised plates (such as A1 or AAAAAA) became special "collector plates", with lettering in blue on white. These plates are often offered for sale at a significant premium to standard plates.

In the early 2020s a trend of using ZAA–ZBB series for newly registered cars started, common on European cars, for personalisation and also so the car is not as obviously ageable. The ZZA–ZZC series is also a trend in the mid-2020s for similar reasons.

== Number-plate accessories ==
A number of companies provide alternatives to the standard message plate. Number-plate frames attach to the plate and provide space for messages above and/or below the licence number, thus potentially perpetrating advertising. Several Maori iwi promote identity and traditional graphic designs in frames.

== Number-plate lookup systems ==
Section 236 and 237 of the Land Transport Act 1998 (LTA) allows public access to the Motor Vehicle Register maintained by the NZ Transport Agency. The Motor Vehicle Register records information about vehicles used on New Zealand roads and the people responsible for their use. The information from the Register can be sourced directly from the NZTA as well as from third parties who include the information with their vehicle information reports.

=== Services available ===
Services provided directly by the New Zealand Transport Agency are listed on the official website.

==== Stolen vehicle check ====
Run by the police, this service allows the public to check whether a vehicle has been reported stolen.

==== Basic vehicle information ====
Multiple vehicle report providers allow to check basic vehicle information free of charge by entering the registration plate number.

==== Owner confirmation ====
Although the personal information of vehicle owners is not available to the public, the ownership can generally be confirmed by entering the name or driver's licence number of the owner. Some of the vehicle report providers (including CarJam, Autocheck, Checka, That Car) allow to confirm the owner free of charge.

==== Securities check ====
Before purchasing a vehicle, buyers can conduct a search of the Personal Property Securities Register to ensure there is no money owed on it.

==== Automotive parts ordering ====
Most vehicle manufactures attach a VIN to their vehicles for identification purposes. This can be used to identify a vehicle's particular characteristics for parts ordering and fluid type during maintenance. A Licence Plate Lookup returns the vehicle's VIN and other data, removing the need for a tradesman to physically locate and record this 17-digit code.

With the influx of Japanese import vehicles, VINs were being attached at the NZ border and not by the manufacturer. As a result, much of the information contained in the VIN for parts-purchasing purposes is absent and many vehicles still require a tradesperson to physically identify a particular chassis and engine type. VINs attached at the NZ border start with the characters 7A.

Goodyear incorporated a licence plate lookup system into its New Zealand website to suggest the correct tyre for a vehicle, although inspection, specialised equipment and a tradesman will always be required when changing tyres.

=== Programming interface ===
As well as purchasing this information from the NZTA through its official supplier Motochek, several companies offer automated access to their vehicle record cache on a cost per vehicle basis. This has reduced the purchase cost of the information and allows businesses to develop their own licence plate lookup systems. The companies that currently offer interfaces include MotorWeb, CarJam and Checka.

=== Land Transport Act versus Official Information Act ===
While the information on the Motor Vehicle Register is official information, the Official Information Act 1982 (OIA) does not affect operation of the LTA. Section 52(3)(b)(ii) the OIA provides that nothing in the OIA derogates from: "Any provision which is contained in any other Act of Parliament... and which ...regulates the manner in which official information may be obtained or made available."

=== Data inconsistencies ===
Inconsistencies exist in the register data making automated matching of vehicles difficult. Although many input fields are available most are not mandatory and the quality of the data entered differs depending on the experience of the operator and the information available to them. Open input fields are used in some instances where lists should be provided causing spelling differences and errors. Model and submodel names are sometimes reversed, vehicle features are often omitted. Over a third of all chassis and engine types are missing, incorrect or not machine readable.

=== Prohibitive laws preventing deep analysis ===
The NZTA offers data analysis of the register but not with VIN, engine number or chassis codes as these can uniquely identify a vehicle. Technically, analysis would exclude all uniquely identifying data; however, this is a legal grey area that has hindered the development of vehicle matching systems using Motor Vehicle Register information.
