= Ministry of Transport (New Zealand) =

Government ministry of New Zealand

- Te Manatū Waka (Māori)

Agency overview
- Formed: 1968
- Dissolved: 1 July 2026
- Jurisdiction: New Zealand
- Headquarters: Pastoral House 25 The Terrace Wellington Central Wellington 6011
- Employees: 180 (2023)
- Annual budget: Vote Transport; Total budget for 2025/26 ▲$12,831,284,000
- Minister responsible: Chris Bishop Minister of Transport
- Agency executive: Brad Ward Chief Executive and Secretary for Transport (acting)
- Website: www.transport.govt.nz

The Ministry of Transport (Māori: Te Manatū Waka) was the public service department of New Zealand charged with advising the New Zealand Government on transport policy. The Ministry worked closely with other government transport partners, including the New Zealand Transport Agency (NZTA) to advance their strategic objectives. On 1 July 2026, the Ministry was merged into the Ministry for Cities, Environment, Regions and Transport (MCERT).

== Functions and responsibilities ==
The organisation's aim is to "enable New Zealanders to flourish, reflecting transport’s role in shaping society, economy and environment".

This aim is underpinned by Te Manatu Waka's strategic direction which is based on Hei Arataki – the Ministry's Māori strategy to deliver improved transport outcomes for Māori.

The Ministry is able to carry out reviews on behalf of the Minister of Transport and also commission other agencies to undertake reviews to highlight best practice, indicating the collaborative nature of the Te Manatu Waka work programme.

The Ministry also provides twice-yearly forecasts to the New Zealand Treasury on revenue accrued from petrol excise duty, road user charges and motor vehicle licensing and registration. This revenue funds land transport expenditure.

== Structure ==
Senior Leadership

- Chief Executive and Secretary for Transport (acting): Brad Ward
  - Deputy Chief Executive, Investment and Monitoring Group
  - Deputy Chief Executive, Sector Strategy Group
  - Deputy Chief Executive, Policy Group
  - Deputy Chief Executive, Corporate Services
  - Chief of Staff, Office of the Chief Executive

== History ==
New Zealand's government decided to establish a Ministry of Transport in 1968 by merging the Transport Department and the Civil Aviation Department into one department, creating the Ministry of Transport. This merger also included the Meteorological Service, which was brought under the umbrella of the new Ministry. The Ministry of Transport's responsibility at the time of its creation was focused primarily on New Zealand's transport and aviation industries, namely air traffic control and the investigation of air accidents at the time.

However, throughout the 1970s, the Ministry of Transport's responsibilities began to expand to encompass a more vast range of duties. In addition to transport and aviation, the Ministry began to take on roles that were related to weather forecasting, managing and operating lighthouses, and traffic enforcement. At one point, the Ministry of Transport was responsible for enforcing traffic laws, but this role was later absorbed by the New Zealand Police.

Despite its growing responsibilities, the Ministry of Transport's role as a centralised government agency shifted in the late 1980s and early 1990s. As a part of the wider government restructuring, many of the Ministry of Transport's functions transferred to other government departments. Maritime New Zealand took over responsibility for marine safety and security, while the Meteorological Service created its agency, now known as Metservice.

In 2021, the Ministry was renamed Te Manatū Waka – Ministry of Transport to reflect its commitment to promoting the use of the Māori language. On 1 July 2026, the Ministry was amalgamated into a new mega ministry called the Ministry for Cities, Environment, Regions and Transport (MCERT), which assumed its transport functions.

== Government transport sector ==
The Ministry of Transport is the monitoring agency for four Crown entities and three State-owned enterprises:

Crown entities

- Civil Aviation Authority (CAA), includes the Aviation Security Service (AvSec)
- Maritime New Zealand (MNZ)
- New Zealand Transport Agency (NZTA)
- Transport Accident Investigation Commission (TAIC)

State-Owned Enterprises

- Airways Corporation of New Zealand Limited (Airways New Zealand)
- Meteorological Service of New Zealand Limited (MetService)
- New Zealand Railways Corporation (NZRC) (trading as KiwiRail)

They are responsible for day-to-day hands-on management of daily traffic, aviation, rail and maritime activities. Their roles and the composition of their boards are defined in legislation.

The Ministry negotiates an annual performance agreement with each entity on behalf of the Minister, monitors the entities' performance against that agreement, and recommends appointments to the entities' governing bodies.

The Ministry provides policy advice to the Minister, in collaboration with the Crown entities, including the making of transport rules. As well, the Ministry negotiates on behalf of New Zealand, bilateral and multilateral air services agreements and is the licensing authority for foreign international airlines operating services to and from New Zealand.

== Road to Zero ==
The “Road to Zero” strategy sets out Te Manatu Waka's vision for zero deaths or serious injuries in road crashes by 2050. This includes a 40% reduction to current rates by 2030. It is estimated that a total of $5 billion NZD will need to be invested in roads across New Zealand over the next ten years to achieve this reduction.

In New Zealand, on average, one person is killed on the roads each day and an additional seven are seriously injured. In 2022, Te Manatu Waka reported 379 people killed on New Zealand roads during the year – 60 people higher than in 2021 and 2020.

The initial action plan for the strategy has 15 items. These focus areas include:

- Vehicle safety: improving the safety performance of the vehicle fleet
- Work-related road safety: ensuring businesses treat road safety as a critical health and safety issue
- Road user choices: encouraging safe behaviour on the roads
- System management: developing a management system that reflects international best practice
- Infrastructure improvements and speed management: strengthening cities and regions

This follows the Ministry's previous road safety strategy, “Safer Journeys” which made some progress, but "was not implemented as intended". According to the Ministry, the previous strategy did not have sufficient buy-in, investment, leadership and accountability to achieve a serious reduction in deaths and injuries.

The “Road to Zero” strategy is supported by the New Zealand Police, WorkSafe NZ, ACC and Waka Kotahi NZ Transport Agency.

Part of this strategy revolves around education for road users. Waka Kotahi – the New Zealand Transport Agency have developed an education programme designed to influence road user behaviour by focusing on:

- Child restraints
- Driver distraction
- Driver fatigue
- Medication impaired driving
- Senior drivers
- Working with school

In late 2022, Te Manatu Waka sought feedback on what is being called “a new approach to managing speeds”. The new Land Transport Rule: Setting of Speed Limits 2022, requires authorities to develop speed management plans with a whole-of-network approach. The revision of current speed limits is a key, but contentious measure the Ministry are considering in order to achieve the “Road to Zero” targets.

In October 2022, it was reported that around 90% of New Zealand State Highways have an unsafe speed limit. Whilst New Zealand Police agree, public sentiment has been mixed, leading to a change of strategy in March 2023.

Previously, it was suggested that 4% of the state highway network would need to have its speed limit lowered to become safe. Amidst criticism from the Government's Opposition and members of the public, in March 2023, Prime Minister Chris Hipkins indicated that the Government would now only focus on the most dangerous 1%.

The state of current roading infrastructure has also been a key point of debate, with marquee Wellington motorway Transmission Gully receiving media attention in 2022 for lasting eight months before needing resurfacing. The motorway cost taxpayers $1.25 billion NZD.

In 2023, the New Zealand National Party's transport spokesperson Simeon Brown said that roads were under-maintained across New Zealand.

In 2024 the New Zealand Road Safety Objectives replaced the "Road to Zero" strategy.

== Clean Car Initiative ==
The Clean Car Initiative is a policy plan developed by the Ministry of Transport, aimed at reducing greenhouse gas emissions from the country's vehicle fleet. The initiative includes a range of measures, such as introducing fuel efficiency standards for imported vehicles, providing incentives for the purchase of low-emission vehicles, and encouraging the development of charging infrastructure for electric vehicles. The main goal of the initiative is to transition the country's vehicle fleet towards lower-emission options, with the aim of reducing greenhouse gas emissions and contributing to New Zealand's commitments to the Paris Agreement on climate change. By promoting the adoption of cleaner cars, the government hopes to reduce the country's dependence on fossil fuels and support the growth of a low-carbon economy.

=== Clean Car Discount ===
The Clean Car Discount scheme focuses on influencing vehicle demand. It incentivises the use of zero and low-emission vehicles by making them more affordable. Since 1 April 2022, the cost of eligible new and used vehicles imported into New Zealand has been reduced through a rebate, and a fee has been introduced on high-emission vehicles. Vehicles with higher CO_{2} emission values incur higher fees, while vehicles with lower CO_{2} emission values receive a greater rebate (up to NZD 8,624), in recognition of the growing environmental and economic costs they impose.

On 14 December 2023, the new National-led coalition government passed urgent legislation repealing the Labour Government's Clean Car Discount programme. The Clean Car Discount scheme formally ended on 31 December 2023, ending government-funded incentives for low emissions vehicle and the "ute tax." In early March 2024, the Transport Minister Simeon Brown ordered Waka Kotahi (the New Zealand Transport Agency) to investigate 231 abuses of the Clean Car Discount involving 51 dealers.

=== Clean Car Standard ===
The Clean Car Standard (CSS) is another government initiative that aims to reduce CO_{2} emission levels by focusing on the supply of zero and low-carbon vehicles. Starting 1 January 2023, vehicles imported into New Zealand will now be subject to a fee or credit based on their performance against a weight-based target. Each vehicle under the scheme will have a target assigned based on the recorded vehicle tare weight. Vehicles that exceed their CO_{2} target will incur a charge, and vehicles with CO_{2} performance lower than their target will incur 'credit units' that can be used to offset charges, or sold to other importers.

=== Charging infrastructure ===
In March 2023 the draft long-term electric vehicle charging strategy for New Zealand's Emissions Reduction Plan (ERP) was released. The objective of this plan is for electric vehicle charging infrastructure to be accessible, economical, convenient, secure, and reliable to facilitate EV adoption.

The draft outlined 5 long-term outcomes. These outcomes include:

- New Zealand's EV charging system is supported by a cost-effective, dependable, secure, and safe power supply and infrastructure.
- All EV users can safely access and use EV charging when and where needed.
- New Zealand's EV charging system is supported by integrated and streamlined cross-sectoral planning and regulations.
- New Zealand's EV charging industry is functional, adaptable and evolving, also appeals to consumers, operators, and investors.

Electrifying New Zealand's transportation fleet is a critical step towards achieving a zero-carbon future. The Emissions Reduction Plan commits New Zealand to increasing zero-emission vehicles to 30% of the light vehicle fleet and reducing freight transport emissions by 35% by 2035, through these projected outcomes.

== Public transport ==
In New Zealand, public transport is a critical piece of infrastructure that provides vital transport links for many New Zealanders, with estimates of 270,000 daily customer trips taken on Auckland public transport alone. However, public transport, and its systems, have required a major change in order to effectively serve the growing number of patrons.

In 2009, the Minister of Transport decided to review the Public Management Act 2008 (PTMA). This review was conducted in order to develop a policy that would increase the use of urban bus and ferry services, while simultaneously, decreasing reliance on government funding.

The Minister's decision to review the PTMA reflected the governments concern of regional councils control over bus and ferry operators and this was not encouraging for potential private investment or innovation. As a result of this review, The Ministry of Transport led the development of the Public Transport Operating Model in conjunction with Waka Kotahi NZ Transport Agency, Auckland Transport, Greater Wellington Regional Council, Environment Canterbury, the Bus and Coach Association and representatives from other operators.

In 2012 the PTOM was approved and was implemented so that regional councils and public transport operators could develop a public-private partnership to improve delivery of public transport services through collaborative planning and investment. However, this model was also reviewed in 2019 and as of August 2022, the POTM was again substituted for the Sustainable Public Transport Framework (SPTF). The SPTF has the following objectives:

- Public transport services supports mode-shift from private motor vehicles, by being integrated, reliable, frequent, accessible, affordable, and safe.
- Employment and engagement of the public transport workforce is fair and equitable, providing for a sustainable labour market and sustainable provision of public transport services.
- Well-used public transport services reduce the environmental and health impact of land transport, including by reducing reliance on single-occupancy vehicles and by using zero-emission technology.
- Provision of services supports value for money and efficiency from public transport investment while achieving the first three objectives.

== Controversy ==
Joanne Harrison was a former employee of the Ministry of Transport in New Zealand who was convicted of fraud in 2017. Harrison had embezzled over $725,000 NZD from the Ministry through false invoicing and other fraudulent activities over a period of several years. Her fraud was uncovered after a whistleblower within the Ministry raised concerns about her behaviour. Harrison ultimately pleaded guilty to three charges of dishonestly taking or using a document and was sentenced to three years and seven months in prison. The case prompted a review of the Ministry's financial controls and resulted in increased scrutiny of public sector fraud in New Zealand.

== Additional ==
The Ministry also:

- Administers, on behalf of the Minister, the contract with the Meteorological Service of New Zealand (Metservice) for the provision of public weather warnings and forecasts.
- Manages the Motor Vehicle Register (MVR) and revenue collection functions which includes the collection and refund of motor vehicle registration and licensing fees, road user charges and fuel excise duty, and the maintenance of the MVR. The New Zealand Transport Agency is contracted to provide these services under an agreement with the Secretary for Transport.
- Has responsibility for the operation of the Milford Sound/Piopiotahi Airport, and oversees the Crown's interest in joint venture airports.
- Represents New Zealand at international forums.
- Licenses all international airlines operating to and from New Zealand.

The Ministry does not have a hands-on-role in daily traffic, aviation, rail or maritime matters.

== See also ==
- Transport in New Zealand

== Sources ==
- Wilson, James Oakley (1985) [First ed. published 1913]. New Zealand Parliamentary Record, 1840–1984 (4th ed.). Wellington: V.R. Ward, Govt. Printer. OCLC 154283103.
