= Cycle Friendly Awards =

New Zealand awards

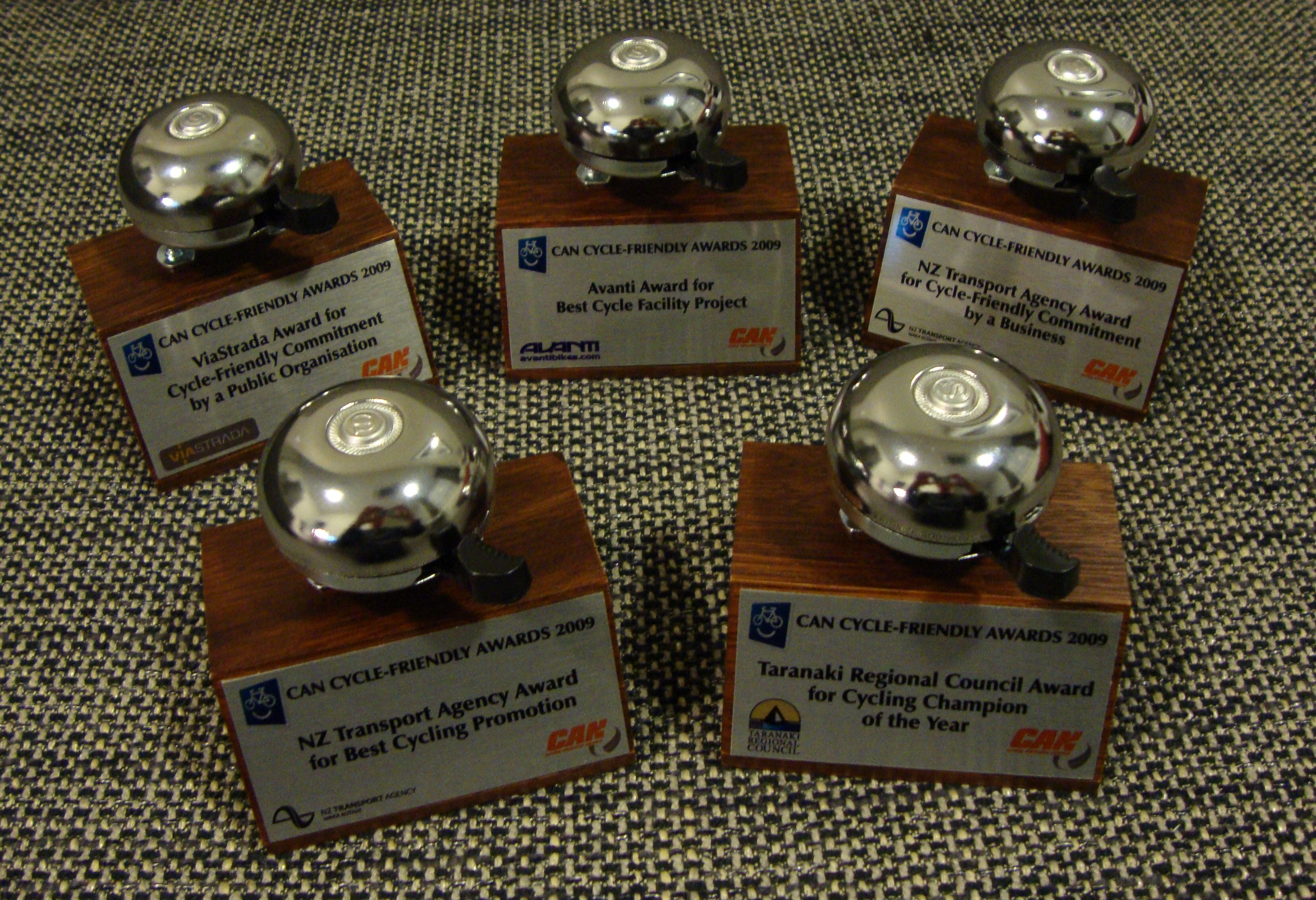
Trophies for the winners of the five categories of the 2009 Cycle Friendly Awards

The New Zealand Cycle Friendly Awards were devised by the Cycling Advocates' Network (CAN) in 2003. The purpose of the awards is to acknowledge and celebrate some of the most notable achievements in the country that are helping to promote cycling and to create a cycle-friendly environment. Since 2016, the awards have been jointly organised with the New Zealand Transport Agency and rebranded as the 'Bike to the Future Awards'.

== History and description ==
CAN announced on 7 August 2003 that the awards had been created. The first awards ceremony was held on 10 October 2003 and the awards have since been awarded approximately annually.

There are several categories (four initially, since extended to five), and in each category there are up to five finalists. Those finalists are announced some time prior to the awards ceremony, enabling representatives to attend the awards function. In each category, one of the finalists is announced the winner during an awards ceremony. The awards function is typically combined with the biennial NZ Cycling Conference, or with the annual get together of CAN in the intervening years.

Finalists receive a certificate. Winners receive a certificate and a trophy; originally a bicycle bell mounted on a plinth.

In 2012, the opportunity has been taken to combine the awards with the "Golden Foot" Awards presented by walking advocates Living Streets Aotearoa. In addition a new joint award for all Walking and Cycling finalists was introduced. These initiatives were repeated in 2014, but the Golden Foot Awards have been subsequently awarded at a separate ceremony.

In 2016, the New Zealand Transport Agency took on organisation of the awards, with CAN still involved, and rebranded them as the 'Bike to the Future Awards'. A new trophy design, incorporating a stylised bicycle, was created for the winners.

A panel of judges uses criteria to individually assess the nominations. The judges work independent from one another, so can't influence each other, and don't know how the others are scoring. Combining the judges' scores by the awards coordinator determines the winner. The following criteria are used:

- Coverage – the number of people potentially affected
- Success to date – of initiatives / person in encouraging cycling
- Potential – applicability to other locations / organisations / commitment by person
- Innovation – relative uniqueness & innovation of initiative / person's action in New Zealand

== Award categories ==
=== Best cycle facility project ===
This category is for the transport infrastructure project year that has had the most significant impact on promoting cycling and a cycle-friendly environment in the past year. Examples could include new cycle ways, cycle parking facilities, or general roading projects that assist and encourage cycling. Nominations are typically received for projects undertaken by local or central government agencies.

=== Best cycling promotion ===
This category is for the education or encouragement project that has had the most significant impact on promoting cycling and a cycle-friendly environment in the past year. Examples could include publicity campaigns, school education programmes, or promotional cycling events. Nominations range from individuals to government organisations.

=== Cycle-friendly commitment by business ===
This category is for the companies that have made significant efforts encouraging and supporting cycling by its staff, customers and clients the past year. Examples of cycle-friendly actions include cyclist parking / changing facilities, employee support and incentive programmes, and company 'pool' bikes. Nominations cover both general businesses and those directly involved in the bicycle industry.

=== Cycle-friendly commitment by public organisation ===
This category is for the public or government organisation that has made significant efforts encouraging and supporting cycling by its staff and public users in the past year. This category includes central or local government agencies, and organisations such as health boards, universities or airports. Examples of cycle-friendly actions include cyclist parking / changing facilities, employee support and incentive programmes.

=== Cycling champion of the year ===
This category, first awarded in 2007, is designed to recognise the contribution made by individual New Zealanders to the promotion of cycling.

== Winners and finalists ==
The following table shows the winners for the various years.

=== Winners by year ===
	Best cycle facility project	Best cycling promotion	Cycle-friendly commitment by business	Cycle-friendly commitment by a public organisation	Cycling champion of the year
2003	Porirua City Council (Ara Harakeke pathway)	Bike Wise (National Bike Wise Week 2003)	Cycle Surgery, Dunedin (Child cycling skills programme)	SPARC (Cycle-friendly employer resources)	(first awarded in 2007)
2004	Auckland City Council (Waterview cycle & pedestrian bridge)	Cycle Action Auckland (Commuter Challenge 2004)	MWH (New Zealand) Ltd, Christchurch (Bike User Group / staff travel plans)	Land Transport Safety Authority (Cycle Network & Route Planning Guide)
2005	Christchurch City Council (Creyke Road Living Streets project)	Axel Wilke ('Planning & Design for Cycling' training course)	EDS New Zealand Ltd (Secure cycle lockup)	Nelson City Council (0800 cycle crash reporting hotline)
2006	Little River Trail Trust (Little River Rail Trail)	Bike Wise & Health Sponsorship Council (Bike Wise Mayoral Challenge)	Tait Electronics, Christchurch (workplace cycle facilities)	University of Canterbury (Ilam campus cycle-friendly initiatives)
2007	Transit New Zealand (Basin Reserve cycle / pedestrian crossings)	Massey University PR team (On Ya Bike)	MWH New Zealand Ltd (Green kilometres on 'pool' bikes)	Nelson City Council (Nelson City Council – pedalling along)	Tama Easton (Vorb owner & director, editor of Spoke magazine )
2008	New Plymouth District Council (New Plymouth Coastal Walkway)	Tauranga City Council (kids can ride – for life)	Bike Central (cyclist services / facilities at Britomart Transport Centre)	NZ Transport Agency (Bike Wise Week)	Robert Ibell (chair of Cycling Advocates' Network)
2009	Waitakere City Council (Twin Streams walking & cycleway)	Frocks On Bikes, Wellington (Frocks On Bikes)	Fullers360 (Fullers’ integrated ferry and bus service)	Police Nelson & Nelson City Council (bobbies on bikes)	Bevan Woodward (Auckland Harbour Bridge 50th anniversary event)
2010	Bikes in Schools, St Mary's School, Hastings	Auckland Cycle Style - an evening of fabulous bikes and fashion	Mamachari Bicycles, Wellington	Belmont Intermediate School (getting children to ride to school)	Paul McArdle and Meg Frater, Bike On NZ
2012	Dept of Conservation / NZTA (Te Ara a Waiau Walkway/Cycleway & Te Weheka Walkway/Cycleway, Fox and Franz Josef Glaciers)	Hastings District Council (i-Way Share the Road Campaign)	Airey Consultants & Copeland Associates (Auckland Harbour Bridge Pathway)	Hastings District Council (i-Way Model Communities project)	Steven Muir (Cycle Trailers, IceCycles, Fossil Free Event)
2014	Nelson City Council (St Vincent Street cycleway, Nelson)	Auckland Transport (Cycling's the Go Summer Programme)	NZ Bus (Road User Workshops)	Dunedin City Mayor and Councillors	Dr Glen Koorey

=== Other finalists by year ===
Between one and five finalists (including the winner) have been honoured in each category.

	Best cycle facility project
2003	Christchurch City Council (Colombo Street cycle lanes)	Christchurch City Council (Living Streets programme)
2004	Dunedin City Council & Fulton Hogan ("Cycle Smart @ Marlow Park" training facility)	University of Canterbury (covered secure bike parking facilities)
2005	Nelson City Council (Atawhai cycleway)	Hamilton City Council (Waikato riverside cycle / walkway)	Rotary Pathways Trust (Napier pathways project)
2006	Palmerston North City Council (Pioneer Highway shared pedestrian / cycle path)	Christchurch City Council (SH73 Opawa Road stage 2 reconstruction)	Transit NZ, Canterbury (SH74 Styx Mill overbridge widening and four-laning)
2007	Palmerston North City Council (College Street cycle lanes)	Auckland City Council (Waikaraka Cycleway – first stage, off-road section)
2008	North Shore City Council (Lake Road cycle lane)	NZ Transport Agency (Atawhai off-road shared cycleway / walkway, Nelson)
2009	Nelson City Council (railway reserve north shared path)	NZ Transport Agency (electronic cyclist activated warning signs)
2010	NZ Transport Agency (Kingsland Cycleway)	New Plymouth District Council (Te Rewa Rewa Bridge)
2012	Auckland Council / NZTA (Onehunga Harbour Crossing and Mt Roskill Cone)	Kāpiti Coast District Council (Marine Parade)	Hastings District Council (i-Way Green Cycle Lanes)	Wellington City Council (Cycle-Friendly Sump Gratings)

	Best cycling promotion
2003	Waimakariri District Council ("Don't burst the bubble" campaign)	Christchurch City Council ("Lighten up" campaign)
2004	Crazy Cranks & Waipa District Council (Cambridge cycle lanes campaign)	Maniototo Lions (Otago Rail Trail challenge)	Jan Nisbet, Weltec ('Wheels Beside The Water' event)	Nelson City Council ('Cycling in Nelson' video)
2005	Auckland City Council (promotion of cycling as alternative transport)	Bike Taupo Inc ('Give cyclists space' road safety campaign)	Bike Lanes in Paradise (Golden Bay cycle safety promotion)
2006	Spokes Canterbury (Christchurch City Council cycleway moratorium – Spokes Campaign)	Nelson City Council (safer cycling in Nelson CBD)
2007	Auckland City Council ("Cyclists, Auckland needs you" awareness campaign)	Sports Bay of Plenty (re-cycle)
2008	Manawatu TriAthlon Club (Manawatu TriA Club's summer series for adults & kids)	Selwyn District Council & partners (Selwyn mayoral cycling challenge)
2009	New Plymouth District Council (Wild West bike fest)	Selwyn District Council (Bike Wise month)
2010	Greater Wgtn Regional Council (Active a2b)	Selwyn District Council (Bike Wise month)	Cycle Aware Wellington (Cruise the Waterfront)
2012	IceCycles, Christchurch (Free Bicycles and Repair)	New Plymouth District Council (Bike Fix Ups)	New Plymouth District Council (GLOW "light your bike night")	Sport Manawatu (iMove)

Cycle-friendly commitment by Business
2003	Ground Effect, Christchurch (cycling support of employees and advocacy)	Sierra Cafe, Takapuna (cycle racks for patrons)
2004	Challenge Events Ltd (Canterbury Events Equipment Trust)
2005	Pulp & Paper Kinleith (Pulp & Paper challenge)
2006	Linwood Cycles, Christchurch (Kidsfest & BMX bike skills)	Orica Adhesives & Resins, Mt Maunganui (staff fitness for Bayfair triathlon)
2007	Nayland Primary School ('Nayland Primary School – on your bike!')
2008	Cycle Tour Operators New Zealand (group formation & "Sharing the Road" protocols)	Nextbike (Nextbike – public bikes)
2009	Transfield Worley Ltd (commuter bike facilities)	NZ Green Bike Trust (tertiary hire bike programme)
2010	Sustainable Whanganui (Green Bikes)	NZ Post (New Cycling Postie uniform and driveway safety postcard)	Julian Hulls (Nextbikes as free public transport)	Revolve Training (Down to earth cycling for women)
2012	Jonathan Hunt (Fixmystreet.org.nz)

	Cycle-friendly commitment by a Public Organisation
2003	Environment Canterbury (model cycling strategy and regional framework)	Christchurch City Council (cycling strategy implementation)
2004	North Shore City Council (BUG / staff facilities / strategic cycle plan)	Christchurch City Council (staff bike allowance)
2005	Palmerston North Green Bike Trust (4,000 community bikes for the Manawatu)	Wellington City Council ('Being Cycle Aware' Police training workshops)
2006	Tasman District & Nelson City Councils ('Life Cycle Courses: of course you can cycle')	Nelson City Council (Bike Nelson booklet)
2007	North Shore City Council (North Shore City's cycle friendly commitment)
2008	New Zealand Transport Agency (share the road in Central Otago and Queenstown)	NIWA (cycle friendly culture and support)
2009	Waitakere City Council (Te Atatū Peninsula cycleway)	Environment Canterbury (ECan initiatives)
2010	Hastings District Council (Making Hawke's Bay the Walking and Cycling Capital of New Zealand)	Greater Wellington Regional Council (Various Cycling Projects)
2012	Tumeke Cycle Space (Bike Tutorials)	Ride On Nelson (Cycle Skills Trailer)	Sport Manawatu (Bike Support)	Hastings District Council (Prison Bike Recycling Programme)

	Cycling champion of the year
-	(first awarded in 2007)
2007	Nick Singleton (Port Hills mountain bike tracks)	Glen Koorey (member of Spokes Canterbury)
2008	Bevan Woodward (GetAcross campaign)	Graeme Lindup (chair of North Taranaki Cycle Advocates)
2009	Prime Minister Hon John Key (New Zealand Cycle Trail)	Rod Bardsley (Kāpiti mountain bike park)
2010	Carl Whittleston (New Plymouth District Council)	Iris Thomas (Kids Can Ride, Tauranga)	Sarah Christian (RoadCycling.co.nz)
2012	Felicity Masters (Sport Manawatu)	Eileen Evans (Cycle Action Waiheke)	Vicki Butterworth (Bike NZ Hawke's Bay)

== Awards functions ==
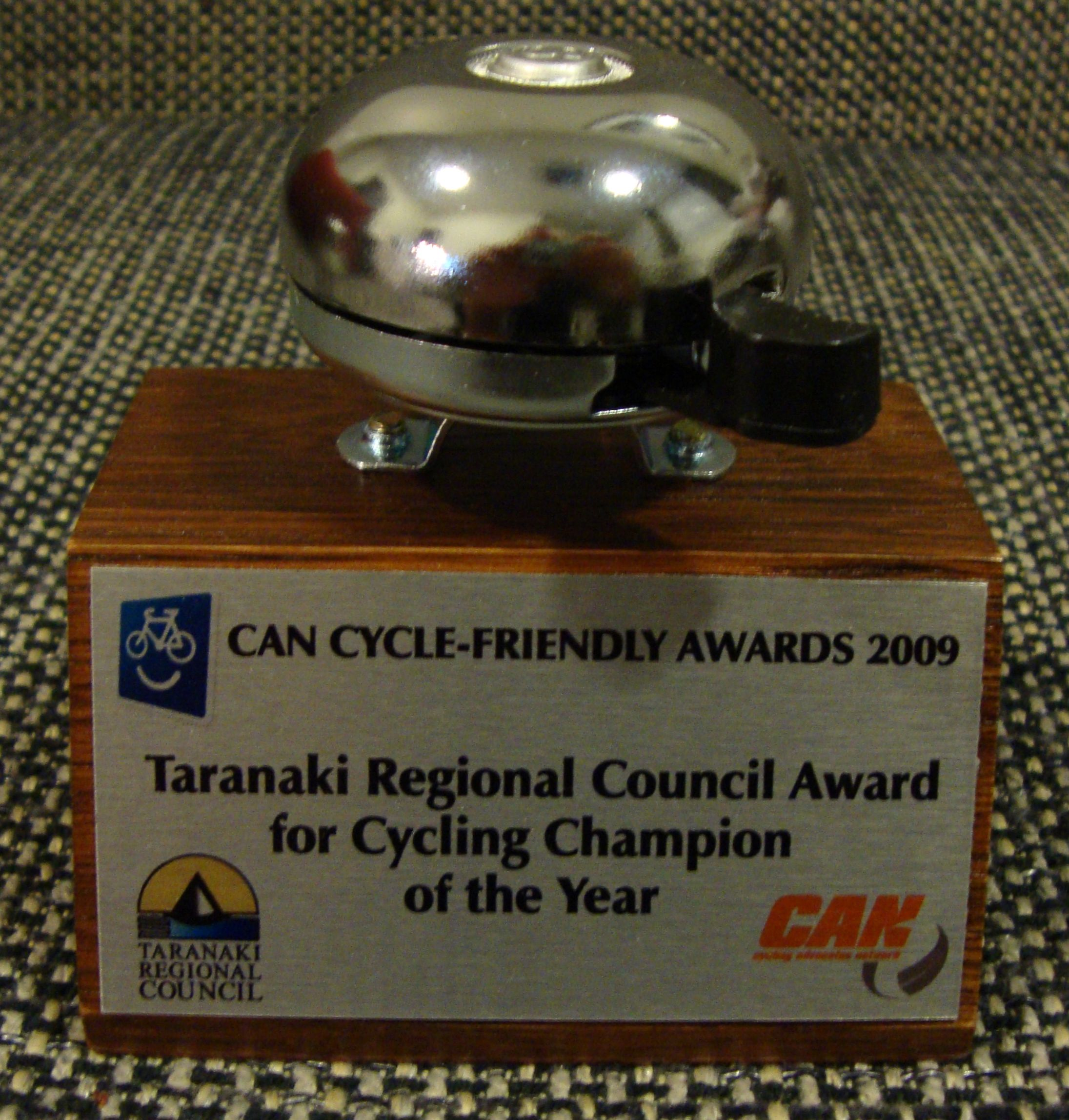
2009 trophy for the 'Cycling Champion of the Year'

=== 2003 awards function ===
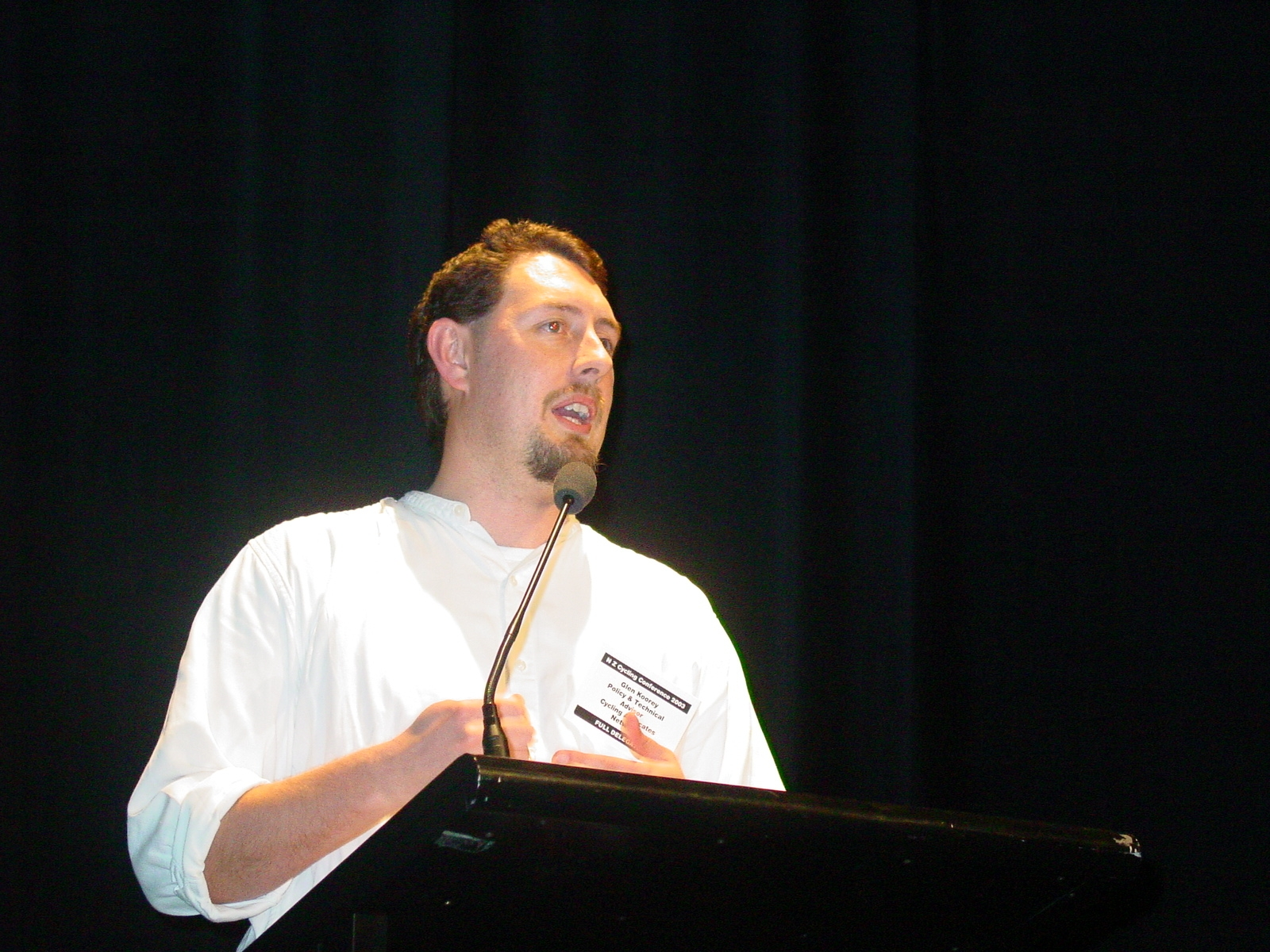
CAN Executive member Glen Koorey presenting the 2003 Awards

The inaugural awards function was held on 10 October 2003 at the Bruce Mason Centre, North Shore City, as part of the dinner of the 4th New Zealand Cycling Conference. In the conference brochure, the event was advertised as the CAN best practice awards. The presenters and MCs for the awards were Glen Koorey (Christchurch) and Jane Dawson (Wellington), both members of the CAN executive.

Apart from the inaugural year, the awards have been presented by a Member of Parliament, as demonstrated by the photos.

=== 2004 awards function ===
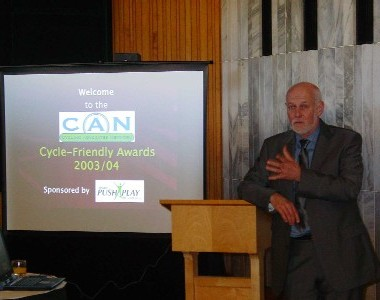
Transport Minister Pete Hodgson presenting the 2004 Cycle Friendly Awards

The 2nd awards were held in Wellington at the Beehive in Wellington on 22 November 2004. Thirteen finalists were honoured, with four nominees taking out the sought after winners' trophies. The awards were presented by the Hon Pete Hodgson, at the time the Minister of Transport. Glen Koorey was the MC for the event. Most of the finalists from around New Zealand were represented at the evening function. The 2004 awards were sponsored by SPARC.

=== 2005 awards function ===
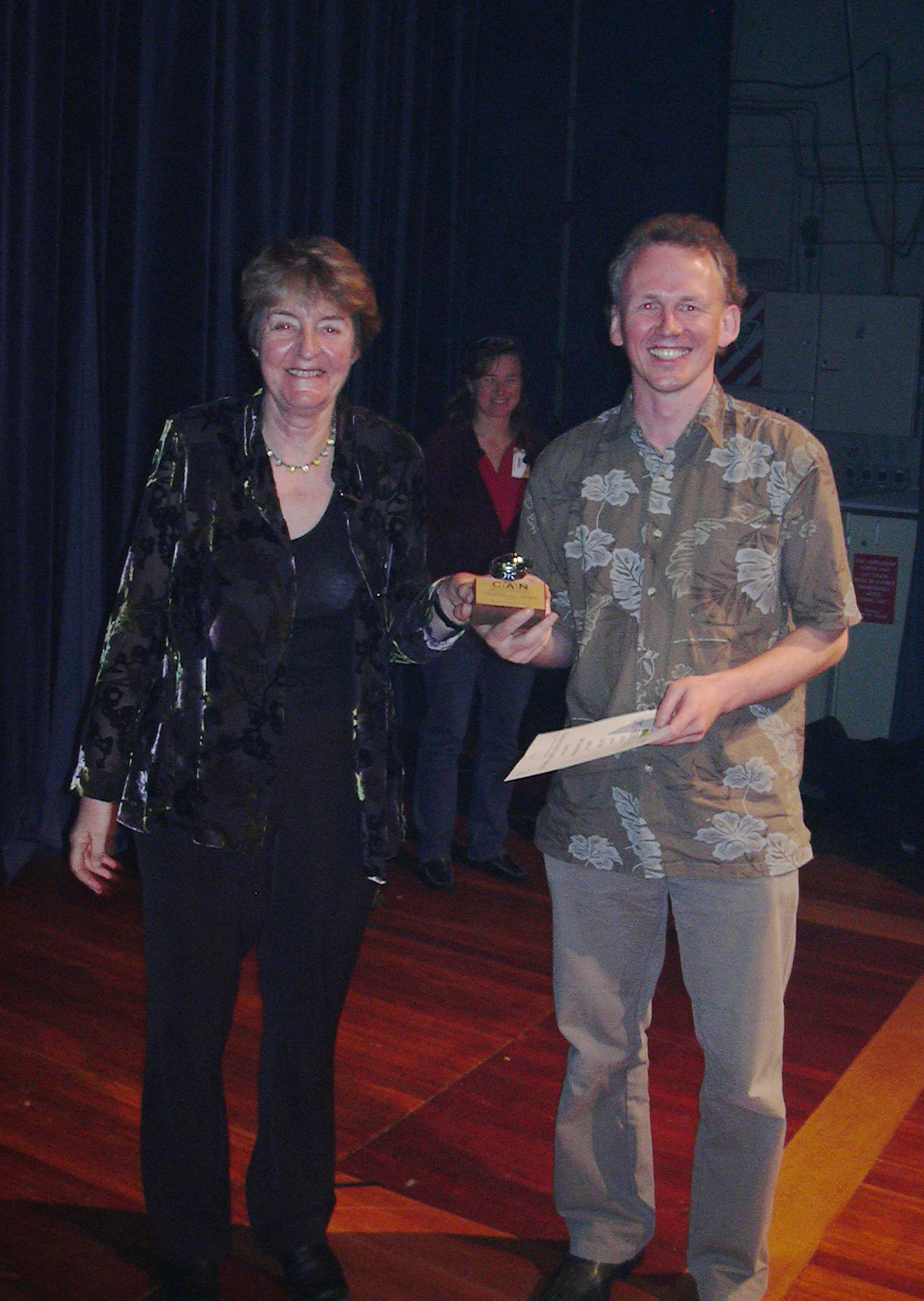
Land Transport NZ board chairman Jan Wright presenting a 2005 award to Axel Wilke

The 3rd awards were held on 14 October 2005 in Hutt City in conjunction with the 5th New Zealand Cycling Conference. Thirteen finalists were honoured, with four nominees taking out the sought after winners' trophies. The awards were presented by Jan Wright, who at the time was the chairman of the board of Land Transport New Zealand (LTNZ). Glen Koorey was the MC for the event. The 2005 awards were again sponsored by SPARC.

=== 2006 awards function ===
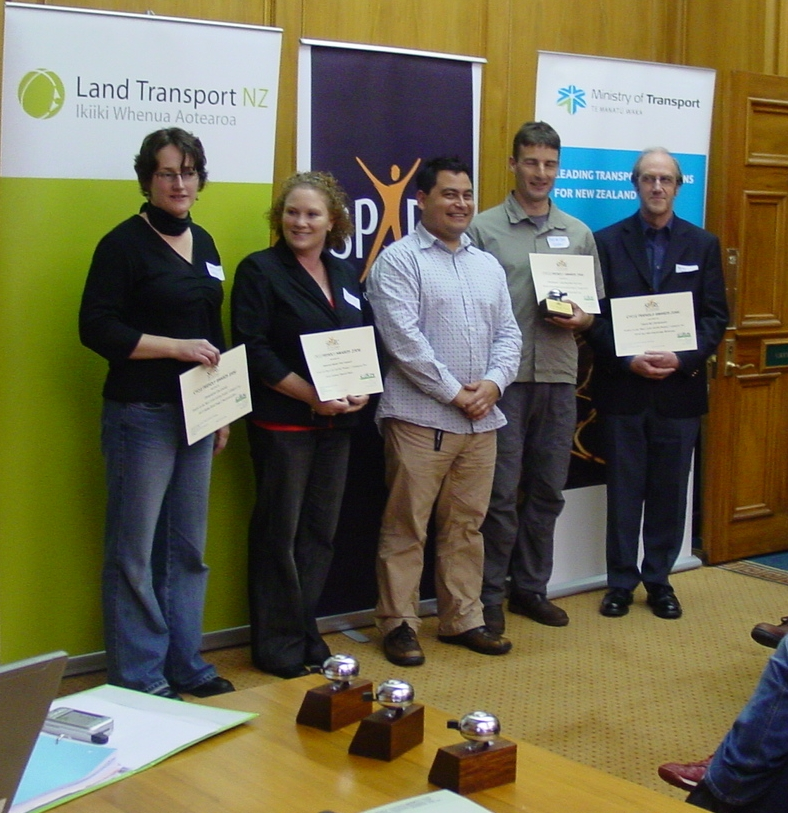
Hon Charles Chauvel with the 2006 finalists of the Best Cycle Facility Award category

The 4th awards were held in Wellington at the Parliament Buildings in Wellington on 18 November 2006. Thirteen finalists were honoured, with four nominees taking out the sought after winners' trophies. The awards were presented by the Hon Charles Chauvel, list MP for the Labour Party. Axel Wilke was the MC for the event. The 2006 awards were again sponsored by SPARC.

=== 2007 awards function ===
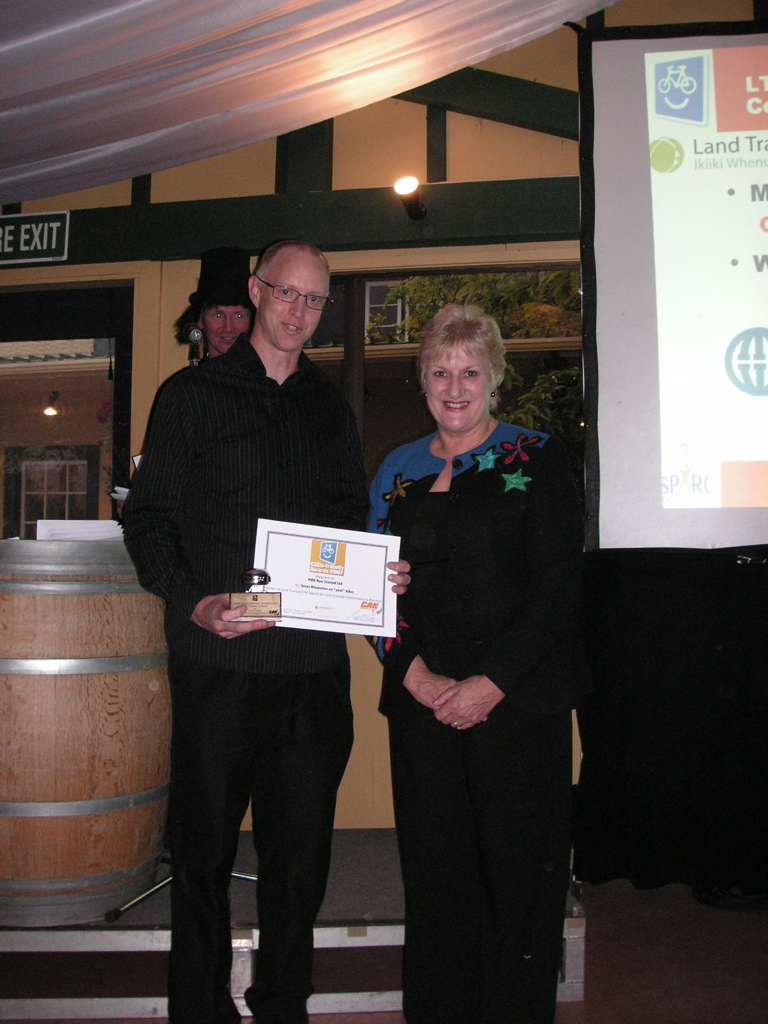
Transport Minister Annette King presenting a 2007 award to Rick Houghton (MWH)

The 5th awards were held on 1 November 2007 in Napier in conjunction with the 6th New Zealand Cycling Conference. For the first time, the category 'Cycling Champion of the Year' was included. 15 finalists were honoured, with five nominees taking out the sought after winners' trophies. The awards were presented by the Hon Annette King, who at the time was the Minister of Transport. Axel Wilke was the MC for the event. The 2007 awards were again sponsored by SPARC.

=== 2008 awards function ===
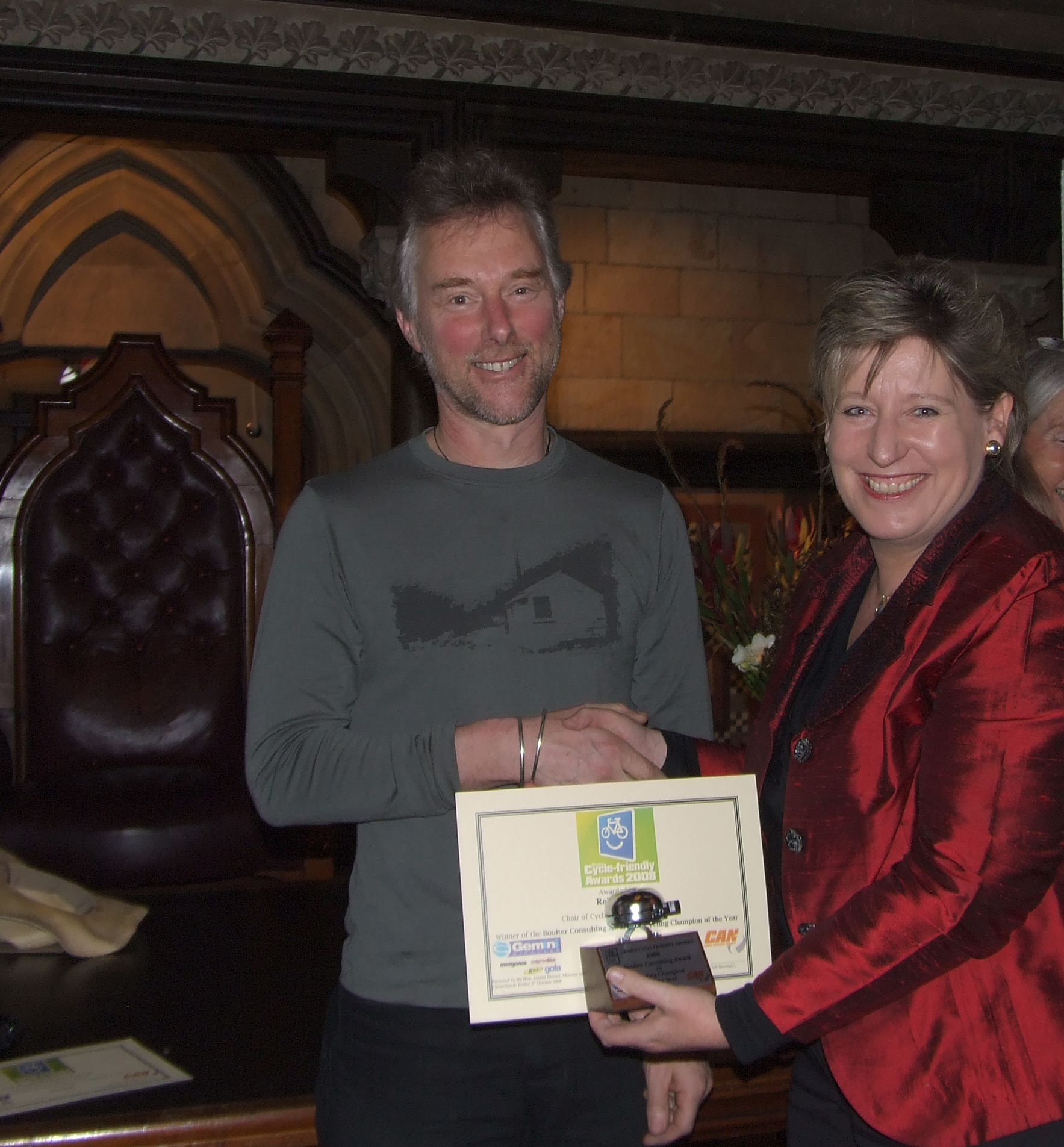
Hon Lianne Dalziel presenting a 2008 award to Robert Ibell ('Cycling Champion of the Year')

The 6th awards were held in Christchurch in the Canterbury Provincial Council Chambers on 2 October 2008. 15 finalists were honoured, with five nominees taking out the winners' trophies. The awards were presented by the Hon Lianne Dalziel, at the time the minister of commerce, who spoke on behalf of the transport minister Annette King. Axel Wilke was the MC for the event. The 2008 awards were sponsored by Avanti.

=== 2009 awards function ===
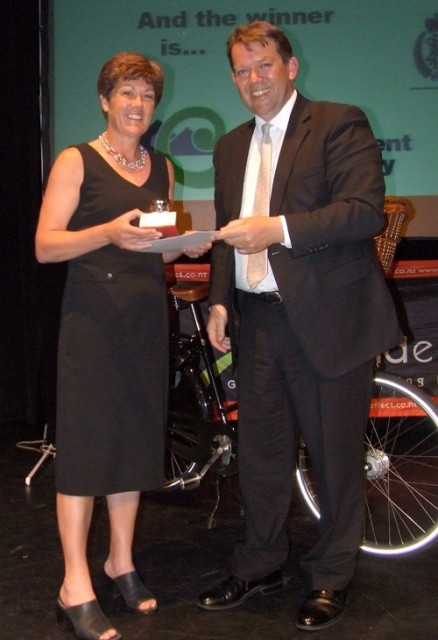
Hon Jonathan Young presenting a 2009 award to Marg Parfitt ('Cycle-friendly commitment by a public organisation')

The 7th awards were held on 12 November 2009 in New Plymouth in conjunction with the 7th New Zealand Cycling Conference. 15 finalists were honoured, with five nominees taking out the sought after winners' trophies. One of the finalists was the Hon John Key, Prime Minister of New Zealand, for the New Zealand Cycle Trail, in the 'Cycling Champion of the Year' category. The awards were presented by Jonathan Young MP, the electorate MP for New Plymouth. Axel Wilke was the MC for the event. CAN was the main sponsor of the 2009 awards.

=== 2010 awards function ===
The 8th awards were held on 29 October 2010 in Wellington, presented by Fran Wilde at the chambers of Wellington City Council. Nineteen finalists are competing for the five awards. The MC was Glen Koorey, with Wellington Mayor Celia Wade-Brown appearing as a guest speaker.

=== 2011/12 awards function ===
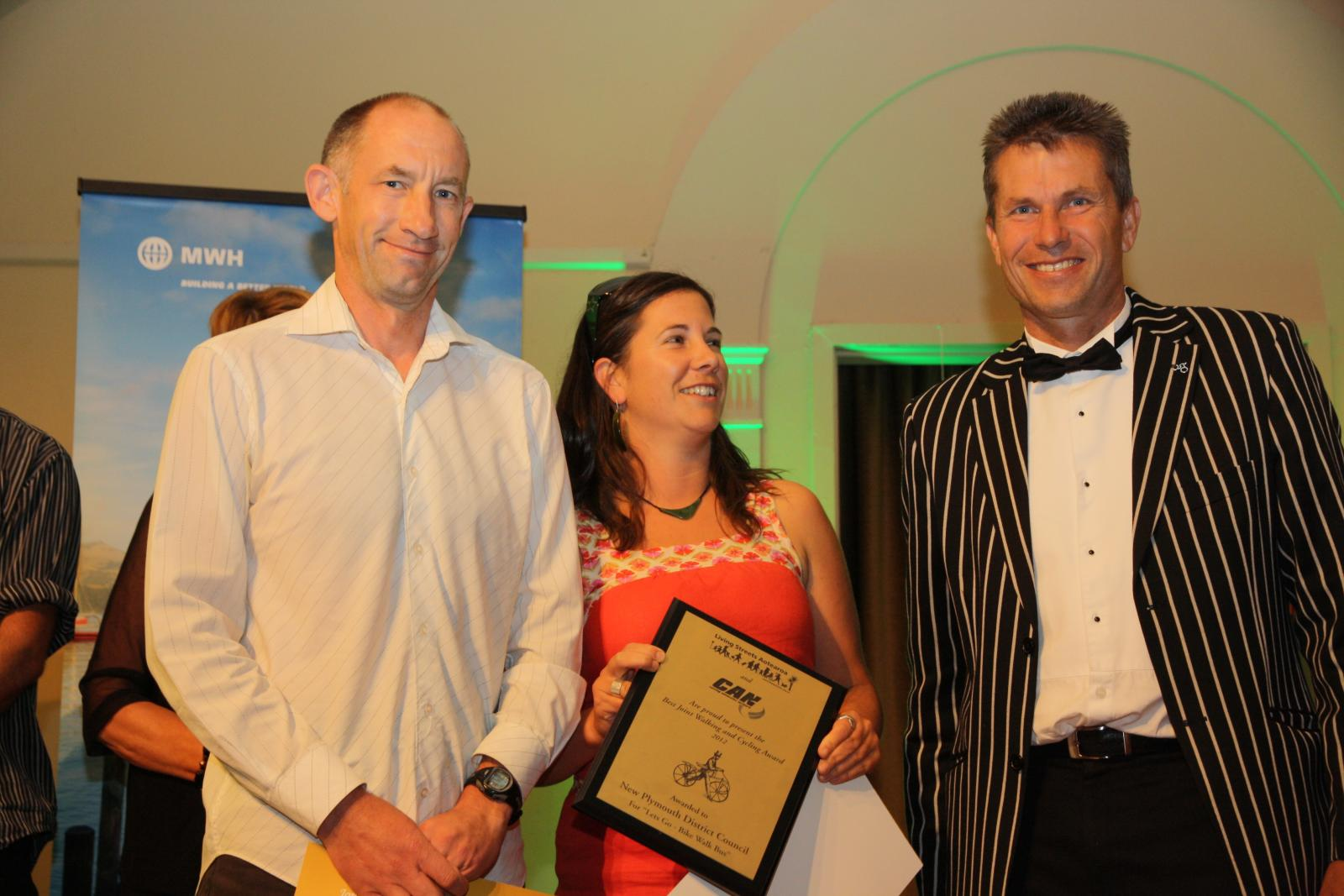
Presentation of the Joint Walking and Cycling Award, presented by Chris Tremain (right; Associate Minister of Transport)

The 9th awards were planned to be held in conjunction with the 2011 Cycling Conference; however this was combined with the NZ Walking Conference. Therefore, the awards function was held in early 2012 in conjunction with 2WALKandCYCLE, the inaugural New Zealand Walking and Cycling Conference in Hastings. The awards were held during the conference dinner in the Hastings Opera House on 23 February 2012. Five cycle friendly awards, three Golden Foot awards (by Living Streets Aotearoa and an inaugural joint walking and cycling award were handed out. The awards were presented by Associate Transport Minister Chris Tremain, and the MC was Greg Cooper.

=== 2013/14 awards function ===
The winners of the 10th awards were announced at the 2014 2WALKandCYCLE Conference in Nelson on 29 October 2014. The MC was Greg Cooper and the awards were presented by Sarah Ulmer.

== Organisations/Areas with multiple successes ==
Several organisations have won the Cycle Friendly Awards or been nominated finalist several times.

The most successful organisation is the New Zealand Transport Agency and its predecessor organisations Land Transport Safety Authority, Land Transport New Zealand and Transit New Zealand. Those organisations were category winners four times (in 2004, 2007, 2008 and 2012 jointly with DoC), and finalists an additional six times (2006, twice in 2008, 2009, 2010, 2012).

The next most successful organisation to date is Nelson City Council, with three category wins (in 2005, 2007 and 2009, all in the public organisation category), and an additional six finalist nominations (2004, 2005, three times in 2006 and in 2009 across various categories). Ride On Nelson has also received a finalist nomination.

Current Model Walking/Cycling Community Hastings District Council has recently picked up a number of honours, with two category wins in 2012 and three other finalist nominations in 2010 and 2012. Two other Hastings-based initiatives also won categories in 2010.

Fellow Model Community New Plymouth District Council had one category win in 2008 and have subsequently picked five further finalist nominations. New Plymouth also won the inaugural joint Walking/Cycling Award in 2012 for their "Let's Go - Walk, Ride, Bus" programme.

Auckland Council and its constituent City Council predecessors won Cycle Friendly Awards in 2004 and 2009 (both facility category) and were finalists an additional nine times (in 2004 twice, 2005, 2007 thrice, 2008, 2009, 2012). Seven other Auckland-based initiatives have also been category winners.

Christchurch City Council won a Cycle Friendly Award in 2005 (facility category) and was a finalist an additional six times (with four of those in the inaugural year 2003, and once in 2004 and 2006). Five other Christchurch-based initiatives have also been category winners.

== See also ==
- Cycling in New Zealand
