= Spokes Canterbury =

New Zealand cycling advocacy organisation

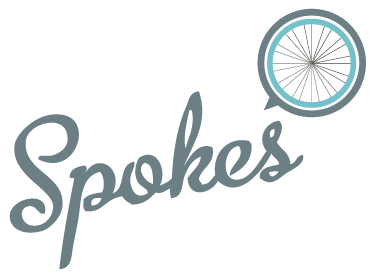

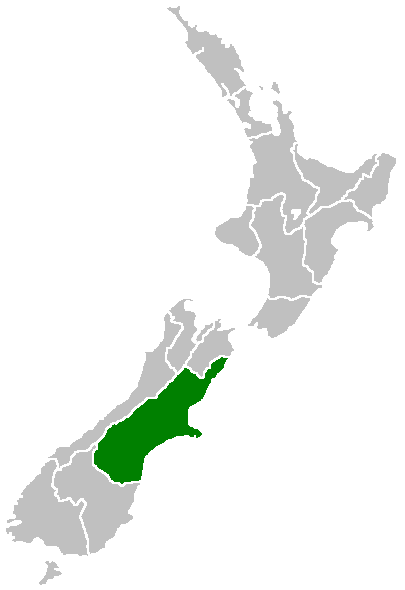
- Canterbury is Spokes' area of influence
- Formation: 1 November 1998; 27 years ago
- Type: NGO
- Purpose: Advocacy
- Headquarters: (New Zealand) Christchurch, NZ
- Region served: Canterbury
- Members: Private persons
- Official language: English
- Chair: Don Babe
- Main organ: Committee
- Parent organization: Cycling Action Network
- Staff: nil
- Volunteers: about 30
- Website: Spokes Canterbury

Spokes Canterbury is the main cycling advocacy group in Canterbury, New Zealand. It was established in November 1998, as a successor to the former Canterbury Cyclists' Association (established in the 1970s). Cycling Action Network is the parent organisation for Spokes Canterbury. It has about 900 members, including "everyday" cyclists, road cyclists and mountain bikers.

Spokes Canterbury works closely with the local branch of walking advocates Living Streets Aotearoa, as well as the local district of the Automobile Association. It also liaises with other local cycling initiatives, including Frocks on Bikes, Cycling in Christchurch, ICEcycles, Go Cycle Chch, and RAD Bikes.

== Structure ==
An annual meeting of members is generally held in May each year; at this event the annual financial report and a general report of the organisation's activities in the previous year is presented. Elections of a chairperson, secretary, treasurer and executive committee are conducted. General business from members is also considered.

For the rest of the year the organisation is governed by the executive committee which meets as necessary to conduct any formal business requiring attention.

Below the executive is the Core Group, this group carry out the advocacy work of SPOKES. Membership of this group is by request and approval is given by the executive. Meeting monthly, generally on the first Thursday of the month, the Core Group do the advocacy and promotion work. This work includes preparing and presenting submissions, organising and taking part in cycling promotion events and other advocacy work.

SPOKES is an incorporated society and operates under a constitution.

Elected Officers of Spokes

Dates	Chair	Secretary	Treasurer
1998–2004	Richard Hayman	Steve van Dorsser	Paul de Spa
2004–2005	Glen Koorey	Steve van Dorsser	Lyneke Onderwater
2005–2006	Glen Koorey	Andrew Couper	Lyneke Onderwater
2006–2007	Paul de Spa, then Matthew Cutler-Welsh	Andrew Couper	Pete Rivers
2007–2008	Matthew Cutler-Welsh	Andrew Couper	Pete Rivers
2008–2009	Paul de Spa	Matthew Cutler-Welsh	Pete Rivers
2009–2010	Keith Turner	Nigel Rushton	Pete Rivers
2010–2011	Keith Turner	Nigel Rushton	Pete Rivers
2011–2012	Keith Turner	Chrys Horn	Shirley Wilson
2012–2013	Clare Simpson	Chrys Horn	Shirley Wilson
2013–2014	Keith Turner	Clare Simpson	Don Babe
2014–2016	Don Babe	Clare Simpson	Robert Fleming
2016–2024	Don Babe	Chris Abbott	Robert Fleming
2024–2025	Fox Bennetts and Stephen Wood (Co-Chairs)	George Laxton	Robert Fleming
2025–2026	Fox Bennetts	George Laxton	Robert Fleming
2026–present	Fox Bennetts	George Laxton	William Griffiths

Other people who have served on the Executive at various times include Axel Wilke, Dirk de Lu, Robin Delamore, Fiona Whero, Andrew Macbeth, and John Lieswyn.

== Activities ==
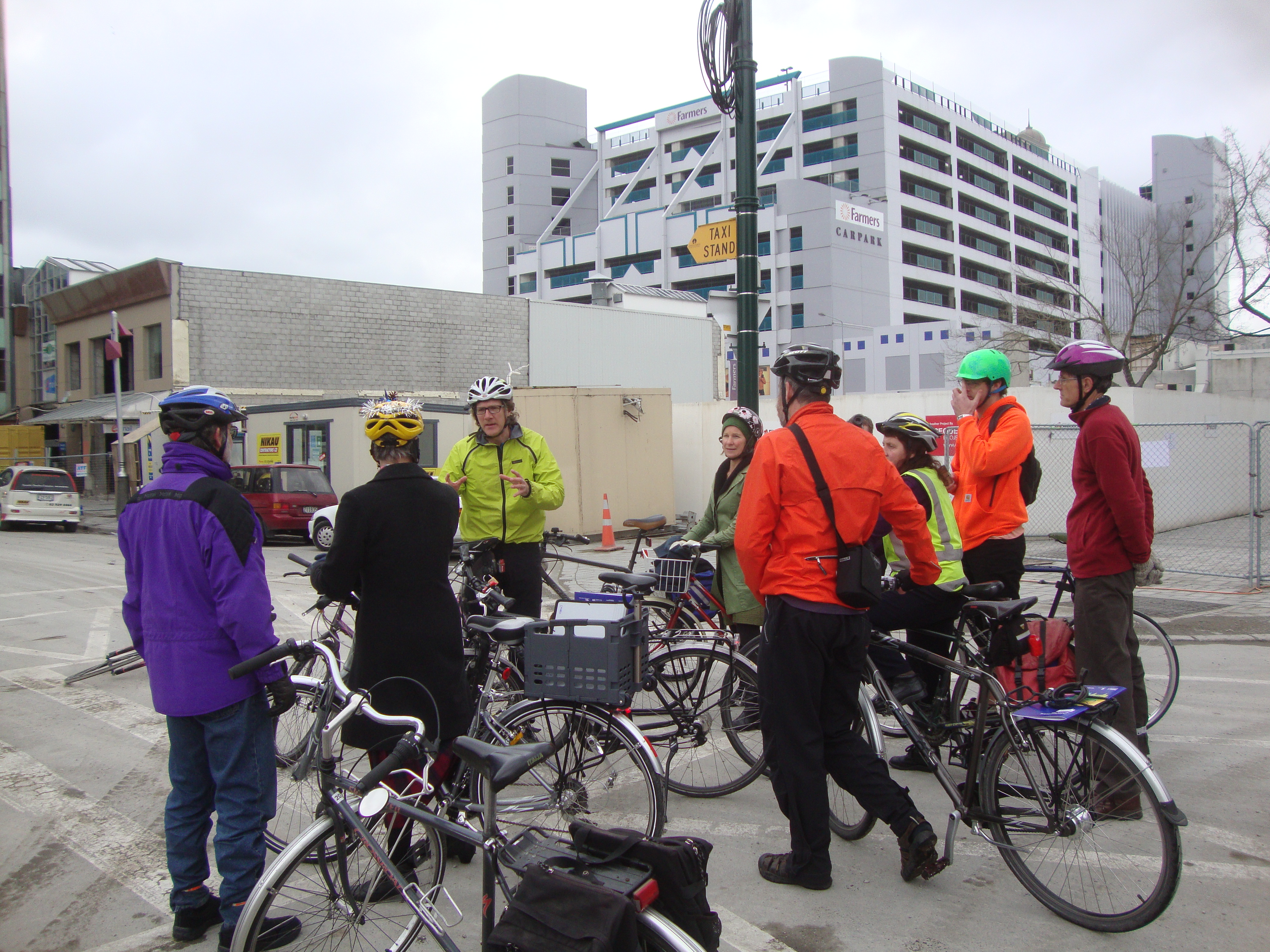
Members of Spokes guided through the Christchurch red zone by Roger Sutton

Spokes Canterbury works primarily to improve cycling in Canterbury, and particularly the region's largest city, Christchurch. For example, they strongly advocated against a 2005 moratorium on cycleway construction in the city – responding to concerns by Councillors about cycle paths not being 'safe' that absolute safety can never be provided, but that cycle paths certainly helped making cycling 'safer'. Spokes has also criticised the reality of 'New Zealand's Cycling City' (Christchurch City Council usage) not living up to its name due to lack of sufficient funding for cycle projects and cycle safety.

However, the group and Council have also often cooperated, such as on the production of the 2010 Christchurch City Cycle Guide. They also welcomed the 2009 Jan Gehl report Council had commissioned, which recommended substantial measures for cyclists as part of a process to make the city more liveable, and to improve its transport system.

Following the 2011 Christchurch earthquake, Spokes lobbied the council to build on the strong support for a more cycle-friendly rebuilt city. This culminated in the Council voting to spend $69 million on thirteen Major Cycleway Routes over five years. However, due to identified resourcing issues, the timeline was later extended out to eight years, much to the concern of Spokes. Spokes continue to work with Council staff and Councillors to provide regular feedback on the ongoing cycleway programme.

== Awards ==
In 2006, Spokes Canterbury was a finalist in the 'best cycling promotion' category of the Cycle Friendly Awards for its campaign on the Christchurch City Council cycleway moratorium.

== See also ==
- Cycling in New Zealand
- Bike Auckland
