= NZ Cycling Conference =

The NZ Cycling Conference is a series of cycle planning conferences started in 1997 in Hamilton. Since 2001, the conference series has a biennial schedule. The conferences are one of the key ways of exchanging expertise about planning and design for cycling in New Zealand. Starting in 2012, the scope of the conference includes both walking and cycling, by combining the previous Living Streets Aotearoa biennial NZ Walking Conference series, and was rebranded "2WALKandCYCLE".

== Conference organisation ==
Initially, conference attendees and speakers were mainly cycle advocates, but the conferences have developed a broader appeal across all sectors that are involved in policy, promotion and provision for cyclists – such as from representatives from the NZ Transport Agency or local authorities.

The conferences are organised by an organising committee made up of representatives of various organisations. In 2009, for example, these included Cycling Advocates' Network, NZ Transport Agency, Ministry of Health and New Plymouth District Council.

When plans were made for what would have been the 2011 conference, it was considered whether it would be useful to have a combined event covering both walking and cycling. This was agreed to by Living Streets Aotearoa, the organiser of the NZ Walking Conference. The first combined walking and cycling conference, branded as 2WALKandCYCLE, was held from 22 to 24 February 2012 in Hastings. The conference was organised by representatives of Cycling Advocates' Network, Hastings District Council staff, Living Streets Aotearoa, New Zealand Transport Agency, and some individuals.

== Conferences ==
Conferences have been or will be held in the following locations:

- 1997 – Hamilton
- 2000 – Palmerston North
- 2001 – Christchurch
- 2003 – North Shore
- 2005 – Hutt City
- 2007 – Napier
- 2009 – New Plymouth
- 2012 – Hastings (first combined walking and cycling conference)
- 2014 – Nelson
- 2016 – Auckland
- 2018 – Palmerston North
- 2021 – Dunedin (postponed from 2020)

=== 1997 Hamilton ===
The 1st conference was held on 15 October 1997. The conference theme was "Planning for and Promoting Cycling in Urban Areas". Held at the University of Waikato, the conference was the initiative of transport planner Paul Ryan.

=== 2000 Palmerston North ===
The 2nd conference was held on 14–15 July 2000. The conference theme was "Making Cycling Viable". Two UK keynote speakers presented via video-link: Prof Mayer Hillman and John Grimshaw from Sustrans.

=== 2001 Christchurch ===
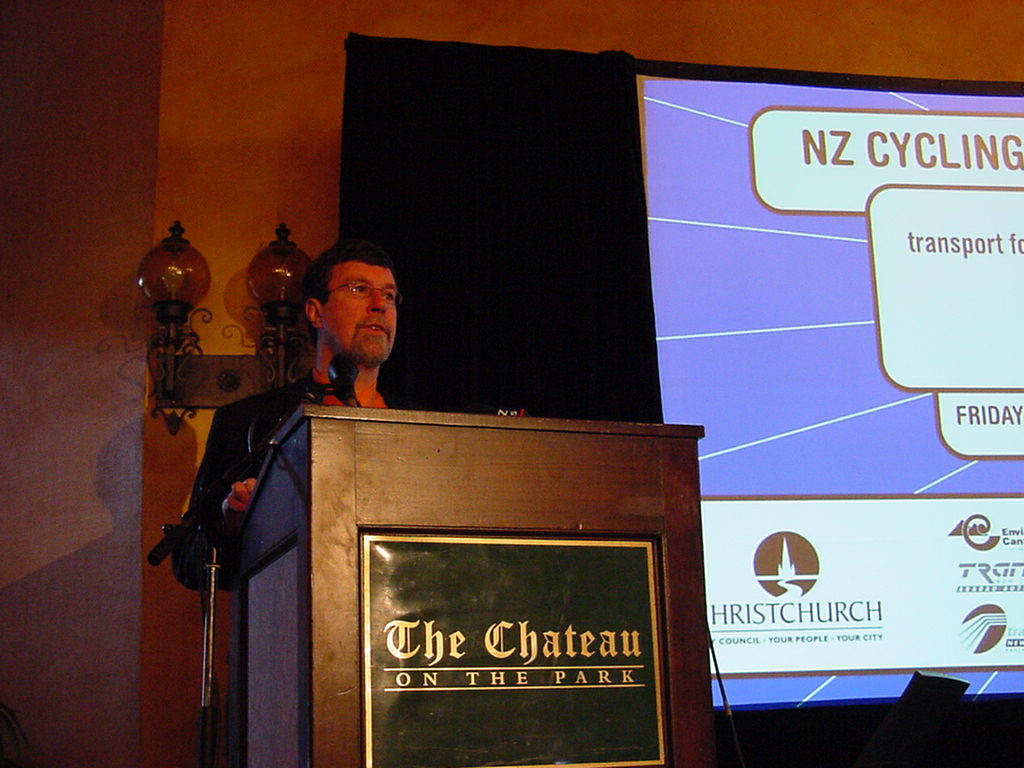
Mayor Garry Moore opening the 2001 conference

The 3rd conference was held on 21–22 September 2001. The conference theme was "Transport for Living". The keynote speaker was Karel de Roy, a traffic engineer and transport planner from the Netherlands.

The conference came about as three people from Christchurch City Council had attended the 1999 VelOZity conference in Adelaide: Alix Newman (the city's Cycle Planning Officer), Axel Wilke (a design engineer with an interest in cycling), and Denis O'Rourke (a city councillor with an interest in transport). O'Rourke was impressed by the professional knowledge sharing that such a conference can provide and announced at the 2000 NZ Cycling Conference that Christchurch would host the conference in 2001, putting Newman in charge of organising it.

=== 2003 North Shore ===
The 4th conference was held on 10–11 October 2003. The conference theme was "Cycling Strategies – And How to Implement Them". Steven Norris, the Chair of the UK National Cycling Strategy Board was the keynote speaker. The first Cycle Friendly Awards were held in conjunction with this conference.

=== 2005 Hutt City ===
The 5th conference was held on 14–15 October 2005. The conference theme was "Changing Lanes – Cycling into the Mainstream". The conference was opened by Lower Hutt mayor David Ogden. The Danish engineer and senior transport planner Troels Andersen was the keynote speaker, relating the experiences from Odense to New Zealand. The third Cycle Friendly Awards were held in conjunction with this conference.

=== 2007 Napier ===
The 6th conference was held on 1–2 November 2007. The conference theme was "Getting There by Bike". The conference was attended by Minister of Transport Annette King, who presented the 2007 Cycle Friendly Awards. Bob Chauncey from the National Center for Bicycling & Walking (NCBW) in the US was the keynote speaker. The fifth Cycle Friendly Awards were held in conjunction with this conference.

=== 2009 New Plymouth ===
The 7th conference was held on 12–13 November 2009. The conference theme was "Communities, Connections and the Economy". The keynote speakers were Phillip Darnton from Cycling England and Assoc. Prof. Chris Rissel from the University of Sydney. Darnton was interviewed by Radio New Zealand's Kim Hill prior to the conference about opportunities for cycling in New Zealand. The seventh Cycle Friendly Awards were held in conjunction with this conference.

=== 2012 Hastings ===
The first combined walking and cycling conference, 2WALKandCYCLE 2012, was held in Hastings on 22–24 February 2012. The conference theme was "Creating Smarter Communities". Featured keynote speakers were Billie Giles-Corti (Univ. Melbourne), Roger Geller (City of Portland), psychologist Nigel Latta, and Alistair Woodward (Univ. of Auckland).

=== 2014 Nelson ===
The second combined walking and cycling conference, 2WALKandCYCLE 2014, was held in Nelson on 29–31 October 2014. The conference theme was "Communities on the Move". Nelson, Dunedin, and Palmerston North had competed for the hosting rights. Vancouver-based Melissa and Chris Bruntlett of the creative agency Modacity were keynote speakers at the conference, as were Daniel Sauter from Zurich, and the Mayor of Wellington, Celia Wade-Brown.

=== 2016 Auckland ===
The third combined walking and cycling conference was held at Auckland's Rendezvous Hotel from 6 to 8 July 2016, attended by 250 delegates. The lead keynote speaker was urban regeneration expert Gil Peñalosa from Canada, who also spoke in Christchurch, Wellington, and at an event titled "Auckland Conversations" organised by Auckland City Council. Other keynotes were Dr Ben Rossiter from Victoria Walks in Melbourne, Australia, Dr Alessandro Melis from Italy, and Professor Karen Witten from the University of Auckland. The Cycle Friendly Awards, renamed as Bike to the Future Awards, were held as part of the conference dinner and the Minister of Transport, Simon Bridges, awarded the supreme prize to the Nelson Street Cycleway. The opening of the Quay Street cycleway was timed to coincide with the conference and was part of the conference programme. Prime Minister John Key, Transport Minister Bridges, and Auckland mayor Len Brown opened the cycleway on 8 July.

=== 2018 Palmerston North ===
The fourth combined walking and cycling conference was held at the Palmerston North Conference & Function Centre between 30 July – 1 August 2018, attended by 200 delegates. The lead keynote speaker was Lucy Saunders, a healthy streets expert from London.

=== 2021 Dunedin ===
The fifth combined walking and cycling conference was to be held in Dunedin during September 2020. On 11 August, four cases of COVID-19 were reported in Auckland, the first from an unknown source in 102 days. This increased the COVID alert levels and the conference was postponed until the following year, when it was held from 16 to 19 March 2021 at the Dunedin Centre.

== See also ==
- Cycling Action Network
- Cycling in New Zealand
