= Living Streets =

Living Streets may refer to:

- Living street, a design methodology for urban areas that aims to reduce the speed of motorized traffic, making spaces more attractive to pedestrians
- Living Streets (UK), an advocacy group in the United Kingdom
- Living Streets Aotearoa, an advocacy group in New Zealand
