= Cycling Action Network =

Cycling advocacy organisation in New Zealand

CAN Cycling Action Network
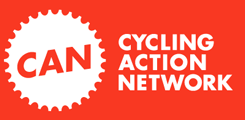

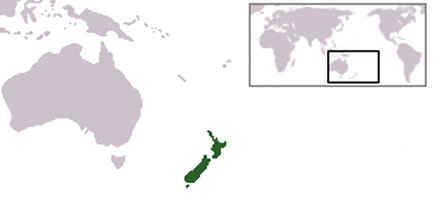
- NZ is CAN's area of influence.
- Formation: 1 November 1996; 30 years ago
- Type: NGO
- Legal status: Incorporated Society and Registered Charity
- Purpose: Advocacy
- Headquarters: (New Zealand) Wellington, NZ
- Location: 8a Horner St, Newtown, Wellington
- Region served: New Zealand
- Members: Private Persons & Organisations
- Official language: En
- Chair: Alex Dyer
- Main organ: Board
- Staff: 3
- Volunteers: dozens
- Website: can.org.nz

Cycling Action Network (CAN) is a national cycling advocacy group founded in November 1996 in Wellington, New Zealand. They lobby government, local authorities, businesses and the community on behalf of cyclists, for a better cycling environment. It aims to achieve a better cycling environment for cycling as transport. Major initiatives are the annual Cycle Friendly Awards and support for a biennial Cycling Conference. The organisation was originally named Cycling Advocates' Network until it was formally changed at the annual general meeting on 20 March 2016.

== Goals ==
CAN's goals are:

- Promote integrated cycle planning
- Promote the benefits of cycling
- Improve safety
- Encourage the creation of a good cycling environment
- Develop cycle advocacy and cycle action

== Chairpersons ==
The group is led an executive committee. Chairpersons of these committees are shown in the table below.

Chairpersons
Start	End	Name
?	17 July 2000	Sally Stevens (Note: Stevens is listed as chairperson in the impressum)
17 July 2000	11 October 2003	Jane Dawson (Note: The AGM was held on 17 July 2000.)
11 October 2003	October 2004	David Laing
October 2004	4 October 2008	Robert Ibell
4 October 2008	14 November 2009	Axel Wilke & Glen Koorey (Note: Axel Wilke & Glen Koorey were co-chairs in 2008 and 2009.)
14 November 2009	March or April 2010	Bevan Woodward
April 2010	29 March 2015	Graeme Lindup (Note: At the 8 March 2010 committee meeting, Bevan appears to have still been the chair. The 12 April 2010 minutes say: "Liz suggested Glen take on the chair role (since Bevan's resignation) until the May workshop. Glen ... agreed to do this". However, Graeme Lindup appears to have taken over as chair instead and he signed, on 25 May 2010, a document for changing the group's rules as "Chair" of CAN.)
29 March 2015	20 March 2016	Graeme Lindup & Will Andrews (Note: Graeme Lindup stood down, nobody put their name forward, and David Hawke pointed out that the deputy chair would take over in such a situation. It does not say in the minutes who the deputy is. The 2016 chair's report explains the situation: "When Will came free from being the stand-in for Patrick, he agreed to take more of a lead role on the committee. So Graeme and Will shared the Chair role through to the next AGM.")
20 March 2016	July 2018	Will Andrews

== Activities ==
=== NZ Cycling Conference ===
CAN has made a major contribution to the establishment and ongoing success of the NZ Cycling Conference series (15 October 1997, Hamilton; 14–15 July 2000, Palmerston North; 21–22 September 2001, Christchurch; 10–11 October 2003, North Shore; 14–15 October 2005 Hutt City; 1–2 November 2007, Napier; 12–13 November 2009, New Plymouth). Since 2012, the conference series has been combined with the previous NZ Walking Conference series and rebranded "2WALKandCYCLE" (February 2012, Hastings; October 2014, Nelson; July 2016, Auckland; Jul/Aug 2018, Palmerston North; March 2021, Dunedin).

=== Cycle Friendly Awards ===
Since 2003, CAN has been organising the annual Cycle Friendly Awards, celebrating initiatives to promote cycling and create a cycle-friendly environment at both a national and local level in New Zealand. The event has since received public recognition, with government representatives attending the award ceremonies.

=== Chainlinks ===
Chainlinks is the magazine of the NZ Cycling Action Network (CAN), which as of 2017 is published three times a year as an electronic newsletter. About a 1000 copies are distributed to members of CAN and a number of supporting organisations such as local government authorities and cycling industry organisations. Published since 1997, until 2015 it was a full-colour paper magazine, whose back issues are available online.

== Association with other groups ==
CAN is the parent organisation for some 20 local cycling advocacy groups around the country, including Bike Auckland and Spokes Canterbury.

CAN was a member of BikeNZ and provided one board member from BikeNZ's inception in July 2003. CAN resigned from BikeNZ in October 2007, but continues to work with BikeNZ on advocacy issues.

CAN works closely with Living Streets Aotearoa, the national walking advocacy group.

== See also ==
- Bike Auckland
- Spokes Canterbury
- Cycling in Auckland
- Cycling in Wellington
- Cycling in New Zealand
- Bicycle helmets in New Zealand
- New Zealand Cycle Trail
