= Cycling in New Zealand =

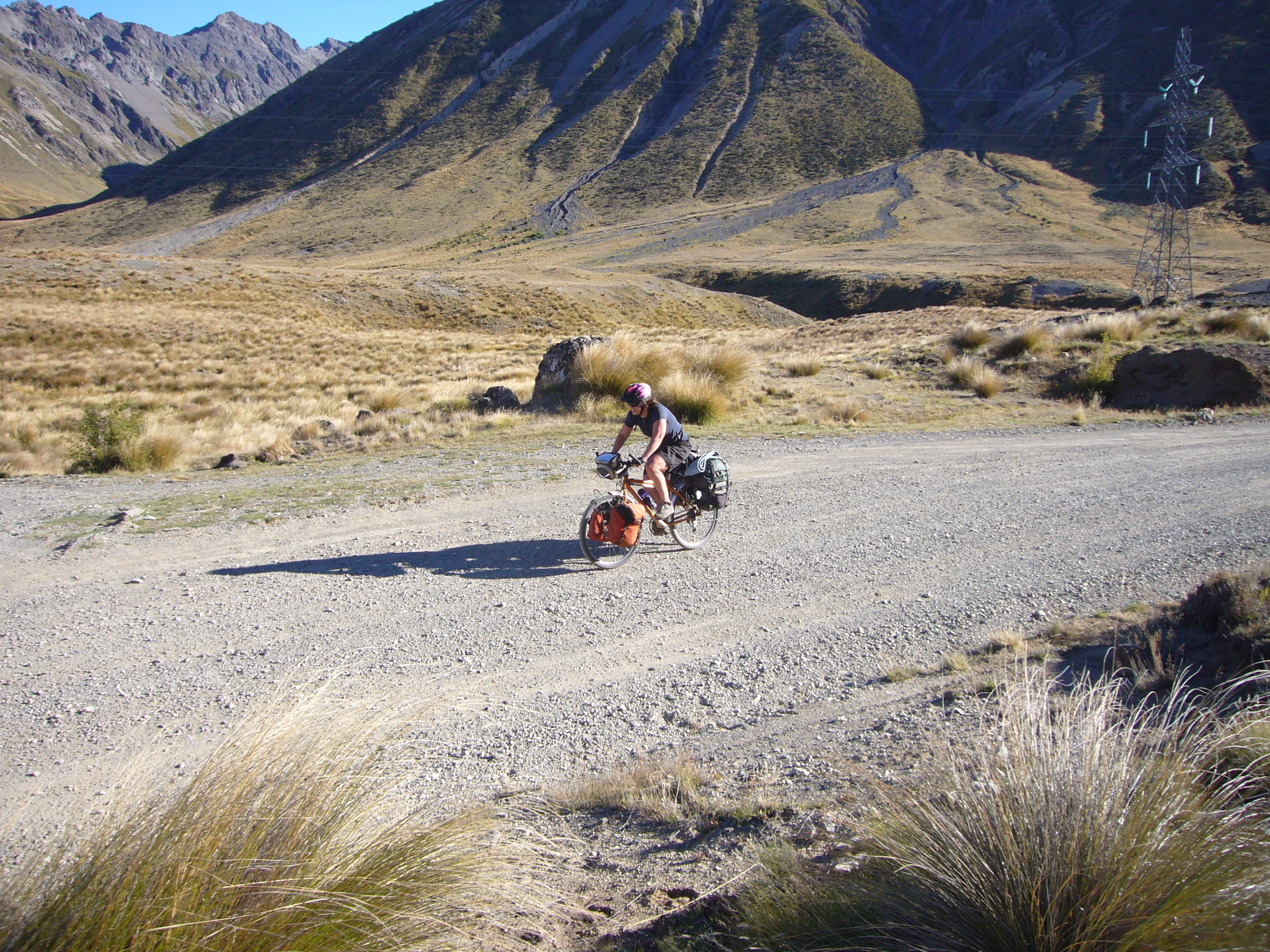
A cycle tourist at Island Saddle between the Wairau Valley and Hanmer Springs

Cycling in New Zealand is the 5th most popular form of active recreation (9% cycled in the last week), but a very marginal commuting mode, with the share hovering around 1–3% in most major cities. This is due to a number of factors, principally safety fears.

== History ==
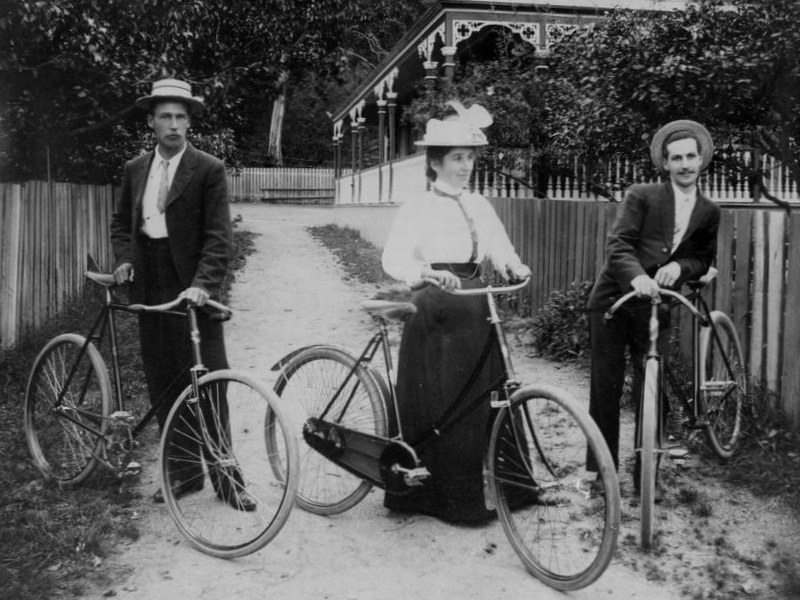
Cyclists in Thames in the late 19th century

The bicycle reached New Zealand in the 1860s in the form of the velocipede, also known as the 'boneshaker'. As bicycle design improved, and production became mass-market, cycling became a popular mode of transport in many parts of New Zealand for half a century. Cycling was a popular form of transportation in New Zealand by the 20th century. Christchurch claimed its title as the cycling capital of New Zealand in the early 20th century, with its flat physical geography the bicycle was a form of everyday transport earning it the name of "Cyclopolis". In 1924, it was estimated that 40,000 of Christchurch's approximately 80,000 people were cycling and by the late 1930s it was estimated that Christchurch was home to 20% of New Zealand's 250,000 bicycles.

In the 1950s and 60s, government transport funding and policies favouring motor vehicles as the transport of the future, along with the increasing affordability of automobiles, spurred a rise in motor vehicles. New Zealand soon had, and still has, one of the highest rates of car dependence in the world.

As well as abandoning bicycles (and public transport) in favour of cars, the remaining cyclists were increasingly forced off the streets by the rising danger of motor traffic, relegating bicycles to recreational and sports use. The oil shocks of the 1970s triggered the first of several bicycle resurgences, and new sports bicycles became popular: first, road racing bikes, then BMXs and eventually mountain bikes. By 1990, a survey showed cycling to be the second most popular participation sport in New Zealand. Since then, cycle sales have remained high, averaging over 150,000 per annum. However, their everyday uses, such as for commuting or shopping, is still rare.

In 1994, New Zealand introduced mandatory bicycle helmet wearing, a change which some parts of academia and cycling advocacy credit with further reducing the incidence and attractiveness of cycling.

== Safety ==
In the mid-2000s, Auckland Regional Transport Authority reported that "over half of Aucklanders believe it is usually unsafe, or always unsafe, to cycle". A 2019 study found that only 28% of beginner cyclists are willing to ride on roads with no cycle provision. This high perceived risk to bicycle users in New Zealand's largest city is due to a number of factors. Motorists tend to exhibit hostile attitudes towards bicycle riders. Bicycles are classed as 'vehicles', a transport class legally obliged to use the road, forcing bicycle users to mingle with heavy and fast-moving motor vehicles; only postal workers are legally permitted to ride on footpaths. Bicycle infrastructure and the standards underpinning bicycle infrastructure planning are poor and bicycles receive relatively very low levels of funding by both central and local government. Since 2026 children under the age of 12 and their parents have been permitted to cycle on footpaths. The 2026 law change also required that motorists leave a minimum gap of 1.5 metres (4 ft 11 in) when overtaking cyclists.

== Cycling and national and local government ==
Since the 1990s, many local Councils have developed cycling (or walking & cycling) strategies to plan for the provision of cycle-friendly environments and the promotion of cycling for transport and recreation. The Government, in its 2002 NZ Transport Strategy (and 2008 revision), officially acknowledged the role that cycling can play in helping to achieve a number of strategic transport outcomes, and in 2005 the first national Walking and Cycling Strategy "Getting There: On Foot, By Cycle" was released. However, from 2008 the new National-led Government set aside this strategy and restricted funding for cycling facilities, citing the need for motorway investment instead. The one significant investment from 2010 was the "Model Walking and Cycling Communities" programme, which saw $7 million invested over 2 years in the two chosen communities, Hastings and New Plymouth, as demonstration projects of what could be achieved with concentrated focus – a further $15 million was then earmarked to these towns for 2012–15.

Following a spate of cycle crashes in late 2010, a national coronial inquiry considered the issue of cycle safety. After hearing submissions from a wide range of parties, Coroner Matenga recommended in 2013 that an expert panel, led by the NZ Transport Agency, be put together to recommend to central and local government how to prevent further cycling deaths and improve safety. A Cycle Safety Panel of ten specialists was convened in 2014 and spent the year gathering evidence and then making a wide-ranging series of recommendations. A key recommendation was that a significant injection in cycleway infrastructure funding was required by Government. As a result, a $100 million Urban Cycleways Fund was announced by the Government and, in conjunction with existing local and national transport funding, this led to a record $330 million cycleways programme over 2015–18.

Cycling is increasingly becoming a touristic and (at least local) economic factor in the 2010s. In addition to successful cycle touring schemes (like those gathered under the New Zealand Cycle Trail umbrella) credited with revitalising local back country areas, are experiences like those reported from Rotorua, where the mountain biking business within the Whakarewarewa timber plantation forest is several times that earned annually from the timber plantation itself.

As a mode of transportation, cycling has fallen from its historic peaks. The modal share of cycling for transportation has stayed similar since the 1970s. In 1976 the figure stood at 3%. In 1986 this had increased to 5%, in Christchurch, Hastings and Whanganui 10% of people biked to work while due to its difficult geography in Wellington this figure was only 1.4%. Between 2003 and 2014, cycling made up between 2–3% of all nationwide journeys. Different metropolitan regions had different shares. Cycling in Auckland only made up 1% of journeys between 2003 and 2014. In Hamilton this varied from 2–5%. In Tauranga this varied from 0–2%. In Wellington (including Kapiti) this varied from 1–3%, in Tauranga this varied from 1–4%. Christchurch had the highest share with cycling making up between 5–9% of journeys between 2003 and 2014.

The New Zealand Transport Strategy 2008 set a target to increase walking, cycling and other active modes to 30% of trips in urban areas by 2040. However, a decade later there were still only 2% of travel to work trips cycled and 5.2% made on foot.

=== Tactical urbanism ===
Waka Kotahi ran an Innovating Streets for People scheme between 2019 and 2021 to improve safety, using an adaptable approach, known as tactical urbanism. 32 councils had 78 projects for walking, cycling and reducing vehicle speeds and traffic. Take up of the scheme was variable. Research found some councils were hesitant about Innovating Streets projects because of risk avoidance, business and resident opposition, regulatory requirements, reluctance to take on new schemes, lack of capacity and cost. For example, Wellington approved a 147 km (91 mi) network of cycleways for $226 m, Auckland a $3 m Regional Streets for People programme and Waipā, a biking and micro mobility plan, but Tauranga's Innovating Streets Project did not proceed.

Wellington has seen the greatest application of tactical urbanism. Its expensive and over-engineered Island Bay cycleway had ended at the edge of the suburb and been delayed by controversy and court cases. It was being built as part of a 2015 cycling master plan. Councillor Tamatha Paul won an amendment to Wellington's 2021 long-term plan to complete the master plan network for $226m. In 2021 Wellington had 23 km (14 mi) of cycleways, mostly along coastlines. Tactical urbanism was used to reduce build time from between 3 and 10 years, to an average of 18 months per cycleway, using teams to do design and public engagement at the same time. Problematic areas used cheap, adaptable solutions and elsewhere more permanent concrete dividers and tree planters were installed. For example, speed bumps made it easier for fire engines to pull out of a fire station, a loading zone provided for a car dealer and protective barriers outside a bus depot were removed to ease turning for buses. Cycleways serving Newtown, the Botanical Gardens, Aro Valley and Ngaio were built in 2023. Another six, at various stages, will bring will bring the cycle network to 73 km (45 mi), with a plan for 166 km (103 mi) by 2030. The first two bike lanes cost $750,000 a kilometre, well below the $1.6m national average. They were also completed in less than half the typical time. However, there are still problems. Foodstuffs threatened legal action to stop a cycleway going past their Thorndon store. Routes for Kilbirnie, Thorndon, Berhampore, Karori, Wadestown and Brooklyn were planned, but the 10-year cycle budget was cut in 2023 from $191m to $110m.

Funding has been a wider problem. For example, in 2021 Waikato Regional Council explained the small spend on walking/cycling (3%) in its region, saying that, although Government, "elevated climate change as a national strategic priority, the Government has not provided the funding to achieve the transformational change necessary to meet its climate change targets and expectations. . . Waka Kotahi stating that 90% of anticipated revenue is committed to a significant programme of work already underway ... There is therefore, extremely limited funding for new projects ... to support mode shift and climate change transport activities, like cycling, walking and public transport initiatives."

== Infrastructure ==
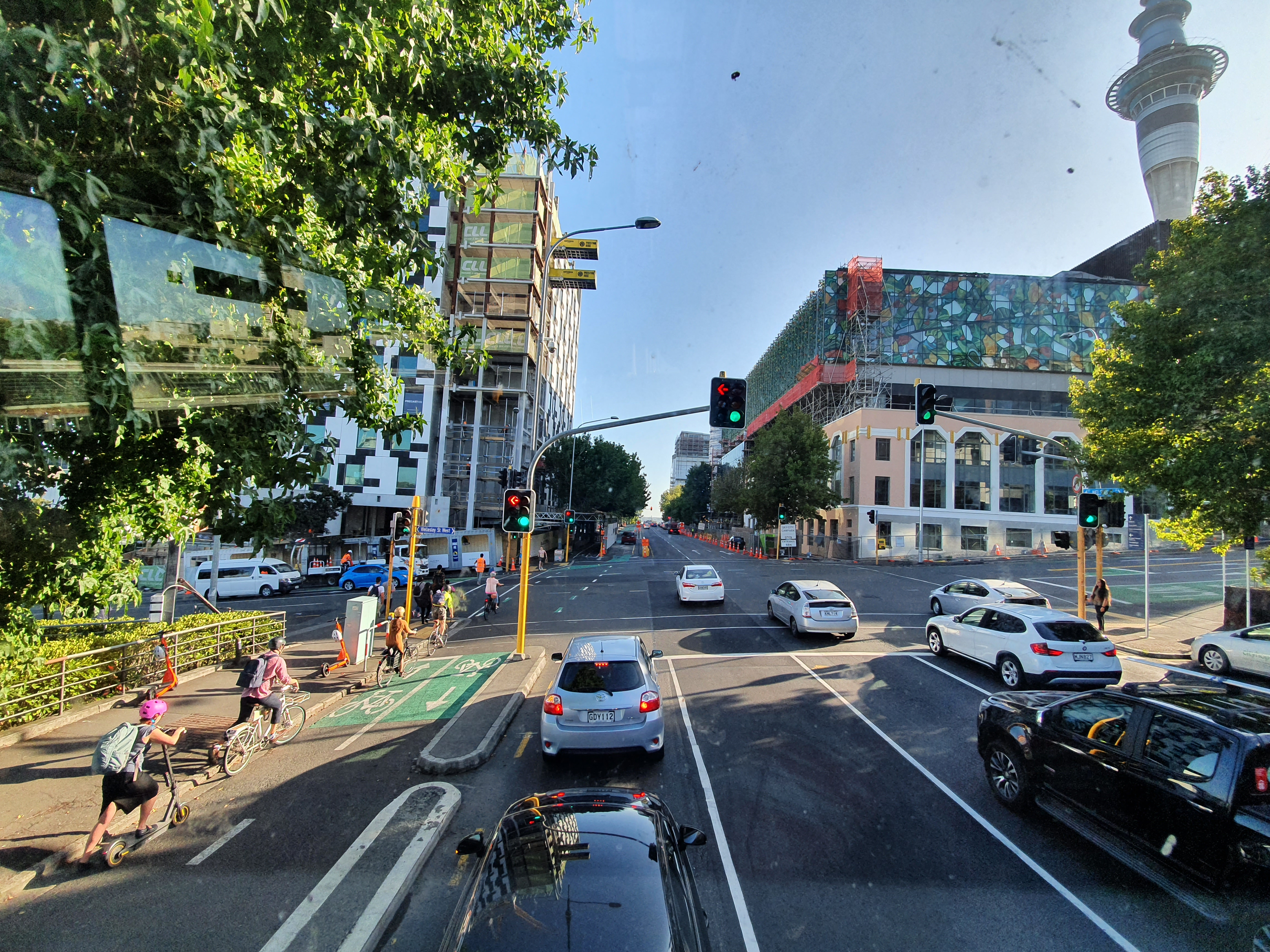
Morning commuters using an urban cycleway on Nelson Street in the Auckland CBD (2020)

In recent decades a number of cycleways have been established through New Zealand, most of them rail trails.

- The Otago Central Rail Trail is a 150 km (93 mi) walking, cycling or horse riding track in the South Island. It runs in an arc between Middlemarch and Clyde, along the route of the former Otago Central Railway.
- The Hawke's Bay Trails, which are in turn part of Nga Haerenga, the New Zealand Cycle Trail project, are made up of three distinct sections – the Landscapes Ride, the Water Ride and the Wineries Ride – and form a 'Great Ride' of more than 200 kilometres (120 mi).
- The Timber Trail is an 84 km (52 mi) long adventure trail opened in 2013 traversing ancient podocarp forests and utilising some of the engineering remnants of the Ellis and Burnand bush tramway from the early 1900s. Located in the Pureora Forest park, it is the most centrally located forest conservation area in the North Island.
- Mountains to Sea – Ngā Ara Tūhono is one of the 22 Great Rides that make up the Nga Haerenga – NZ Cycle Trail network. Comprising 242 kilometres of connected cycle trails (plus an exciting river jetboat trip), and taking riders from Turoa on Mt Ruapehu navigating the Whanganui River to the Tasman Sea at North Mole. Including Ohakune Old Coach Road, Mangapurua (Bridge to Nowhere), Kaiwhakauka, Fishers Track, Whanganui River Road and Whanganui Urban routes.
- The Little River Rail Trail is a cycling and walking track established near Little River on Banks Peninsula in the Canterbury region of the South Island. The first section opened in May 2006.
- The route of the defunct Dun Mountain Railway is regularly used for cycling.
- The Rimutaka Incline, replaced by the Rimutaka Tunnel in 1955, has now been established as a cycling route.
- Pipiwharauroa Way near Raglan.
- Christchurch, which has historically had one of the highest rates of cycling in the country (currently 7% commuters), has over 200 kilometres of cycle lanes, pathways, and other cycling facilities, including the Railway Cycleway and Hagley Park.
- In Auckland, there are a growing number of urban cycleways through the city.
- New dedicated shared cycleway/walkways have been introduced in the 2020s in Dunedin (Te Aka Ōtākou (36 km), linking Dunedin with Port Chalmers and Portobello) and Wellington (Te Ara Tupua (12 km), linking Wellington City and Lower Hutt).
- The 2017 Kāpiti Expressway (MacKays to Peka Peka) SH1 has a cycle path along 18 km (11 mi) of the highway. The cycle paths also crosslink the existing urban area to improve walking, cycle and horse riding routes.

=== New Zealand Cycle Trail ===
In early 2009, Prime Minister John Key, proposed a 'New Zealand Cycleway' and in mid 2009, $50 million for the first three years was set aside for construction of a network of 'Great Rides' (Nga Haerenga), most of which opened between 2011 and 2013.

In 2020, there were 1,985,600 trips on the New Zealand Cycle Trail Great Rides (compared with 1,300,000 estimated trips in 2015). 1,025,000 of these trips were by pedestrians and 960,200 of these trips were by cyclists. At 1,822 cycle trips for the year, the St James Cycle Trail was the least popular of the Great Rides (unchanged since 2015). At 188,000 cycle trips and 220,000 pedestrian trips for the year, the Hawke's Bay Cycle Trail was the most popular. Otago Central Rail Trail recorded 68,000 trips, with 13,000 of these being people riding the full trail (similar to 2015).

== Events and races ==
A number of cycling events are held around the country as fun rides, fundraisers or competitive cycling events:

- The 160 km (99 mi) Lake Taupo Cycle Challenge has been held since 1977 and is predominately a non-competitive event. The event raises money for the Lake Taupō community.
- The 100 km (62 mi) Christchurch to Akaroa Le Race has been held annually since 2000. It has been described as a "tough hill-climbing event".
- The Tour of Southland is a road bicycle racing stage race held in Southland.
- The Tour de Vineyards is a road cycling race held in and around Richmond. The race exists of both a men's and a women's competition over four stages.
- The Graperide is a 101 km (63 mi) cycling race based around Blenheim.
- The TelstraClear Challenge is a variety of events centred on the Auckland Harbour Bridge and Northern Busway, including a 110 km (68 mi) race and a variety of cycling culture events, taking place for the first time in December 2011.
- New Zealand's most historic cycle race, the Christchurch-to-Timaru event, was discontinued in 2009, after having been held 87 times since 1899. The reason cited was that the required traffic management was too expensive for the small local cycling club.

== Organisations and institutions ==
Cycling Action Network (CAN) is a national cycling advocacy group founded in November 1996. It aims to achieve a better cycling environment for cycling as transport and tourism. Major initiatives are the annual Cycle Friendly Awards and support for a biennial Cycling Conference (now held as a joint walking & cycling conference).

CAN is the parent organisation for some 20 local cycling advocacy groups around the country, including Bike Auckland, Cycle Aware Wellington and Spokes Canterbury.

BikeNZ was created in July 2003 to act as an umbrella body embracing all national bike and cycling organisations including, BMX NZ, CAN, Cycling NZ, Mountain Bike NZ and NZ Schools Cycling Association. It is the national governing body of cycle racing and has a strong focus on sports cycling; in 2014 BikeNZ rebranded as Cycling NZ. CAN was a member of BikeNZ and provided one board member from BikeNZ's inception in July 2003. CAN resigned from BikeNZ in October 2007, but continues to work with BikeNZ on advocacy issues.

Vorb is an online forum set up by Tama Easton as a place for stories and photos from mountain bike trips of a group of friends. In early 2001 it became public, was mentioned in the media and quickly grew into one of the most used sports and outdoors websites in New Zealand, long extending beyond just mountain biking or even cycling. The Vorb community has grown into tens of thousands of cyclists, trampers, climbers, paddlers and others. Vorb has won "Best Sports and Recreation Site" at the People's Choice Netguide Web Awards for 2007, 2008 and 2009 in the 'Best Sports and Recreation Site' category.

== Helmets ==
Since 1994 it has been mandatory by law to wear a bicycle helmet while riding a bicycle in New Zealand. The law was enacted after intense lobbying by Rebecca Oaten after her son was injured in a cycle accident.

A Massey University study in 2006 found that compulsory bicycle helmet laws led to a lower uptake of cycling, especially among women.

Advocacy groups like Cycle Action Auckland have argued that helmets are useful safety devices, but noted out that some cyclists consider them a symbol portraying cycling as dangerous, especially when most severe cycling crashes had been shown to be caused by inattentive motorists.

== See also ==
- Cycling in Auckland
- Cycling in Wellington
- Locky Dock, parking and charging stations
- Nextbike (New Zealand), a bicycle rental scheme
