= International Federation of Pedestrians =

Group of pedestrian organisations

The International Federation of Pedestrians (IFP) is a global network of non-profit organisations and individuals advocating for pedestrian rights, safe and inclusive public space, and walkable urban environments. The federation works across policy, research, and capacity-building to promote walking as a fundamental and equitable mode of mobility. It collaborates with civil society organisations, academic institutions, and international bodies on issues related to road safety, urban accessibility, and sustainable transport..

== History ==
The IFP was founded in 1963 as an umbrella organisation for national pedestrian advocacy groups. In its early decades, the federation focused on improving conditions for pedestrians and facilitating international exchange on pedestrian policy and safety.

During the 1970s and early 1980s, IFP organised a series of international conferences addressing pedestrian issues, including meetings in The Hague (1972 and 1979), London (1975), Amsterdam (1975), Geilo (1976), Paris (1978), Gothenburg (1981), and Perpignan (1983). These events provided a platform for discussion on urban design, road safety, and pedestrian rights. In subsequent years, the organisation continued its activities through more occasional and informal meetings.

IFP also developed communication and knowledge-sharing initiatives, including the quarterly newsletter Pedestrian International and a series of technical publications titled The Voice of the Pedestrian.

From the late 1980s onwards, the federation expanded its scope beyond industrialised countries to include a stronger focus on low- and middle-income contexts, where rapid motorisation was associated with rising levels of traffic-related fatalities and injuries among pedestrians. In 1991, IFP co-sponsored the International Conference on Traffic Safety (ICOTS) in New Delhi, held under the theme “The Vulnerable Road User”. The organisation also contributed to the establishment of the Pedestrians Association of India and supported the creation of new pedestrian advocacy groups in different regions.

In 2005, IFP underwent a relaunch, introducing a new visual identity and website, and reinforcing its role as an international network of organisations and individuals working on walking and public space.

In 2009, IFP participated in the First Global Meeting of NGOs Advocating for Road Safety and Road Victims and became a member of the United Nations Road Safety Collaboration.

In 2013, the federation contributed to the development of the Pedestrian Safety Manual published by the World Health Organization, and formalised its mission and vision statements.

Between 2017 and 2019, IFP was a partner in the European-funded project MORE (Multi-modal Optimisation of Road-space in Europe), which focused on the allocation of urban street space among different transport modes.

From 2019 onwards, the organisation increased its international engagement, including contributions to the European Union’s General Safety Regulation and participation in the Third Global Ministerial Conference on Road Safety in Stockholm.

In 2020, IFP expanded its policy capacity through the recruitment of dedicated staff, enabling more sustained engagement with international processes such as the work of the UNECE World Forum for Harmonization of Vehicle Regulations.

In 2023, IFP began participation in new research and innovation projects funded under the European Union’s Horizon Europe programme, including UPPER, REALLOCATE and JUST STREETS.

== Mission, vision and approach ==
IFP works to promote a shift away from car-centric urban planning towards people-centred approaches that prioritise walking and public space. Its work is grounded in principles of accessibility, equity, and sustainability. The organisation emphasises:

- Walking as a fundamental and universal mode of mobility
- The role of public space in social life and community wellbeing
- The need to address inequalities in mobility related to gender, age, disability, and socio-economic conditions
- The integration of pedestrian needs into transport and urban policy

=== Vision ===
A world where walking is valued as a natural right, where public space is safe, caring, comfortable and inviting for all. Cities are no longer hostile or car-centred: walking becomes a default mode for everyday life, exploration, curiosity and connection.

== Global network and capacity building ==
IFP operates as a global network of member organisations and individual advocates working on walking and public space across different regions. Its membership includes civil society organisations, advocacy groups, researchers, and practitioners engaged in issues related to pedestrian safety, accessibility, and urban mobility. Their network is organised in two key groups, pedestrian organisations who can join as key voting members and become part of the IFP board, while individual advocates can join the IFP Network that focuses on advocates, activists, academics and other pedestrian advocates who are not part of organisations.

The federation facilitates collaboration and knowledge exchange among its members, supporting the sharing of practices, tools, and policy approaches adapted to diverse geographical and socio-economic contexts. Through this network, IFP contributes to strengthening local and national pedestrian movements, particularly in contexts where walking constitutes a primary mode of transport but remains underrepresented in policy and investment.

The organisation’s activities reflect a broad international scope, with over 50 members in over 40 countries and collaborations spanning all continents. This global perspective informs its advocacy and research, emphasising context-sensitive approaches to improving conditions for walking and public space.

Current list of organisation members:

Country	Organisation
Australia	Queensland Walks
Australia	Victoria Walks
Australia	Walk Sydney
Austria	Walk-Space
Belgium	Johanna.be
Belgium	Tous à pied
Belgium	Voetgangersbeweging
Brazil	Corrida Amiga
Brazil	Instituto Caminhabilidade
Bulgaria	Pedestrians Foundation
Canada	Piétons Québec
Canada	Walk Toronto
Colombia	Fundaciòn Colombiana de Peatones
Colombia	Fundapeatón
Czech Republic	Pěšky městem
Denmark	Dansk Fodgænger Forbund
Ecuador	Peatones Quito
Finland	Helsingin Jalankulkijat
France	60 Millions de Piétons
Georgia	Iare Pekhit
Germany	Fuss eV
Greece	Enosipezon
India	Pedestrians Welfare Association
India	The Right to Walk Foundation
Indonesia	Koalisi Pejalan Kaki
Italy	Movimento Diritti dei Pedoni
Italy	Associazione per i Diritti dei Pedoni di Roma e del Lazio
Italy	Federazione Camminacittà
Korea	Urban Action Network
Mexico	Liga Peatonal
Netherlands	MENSenSTRAAT
New Zealand	Living Streets Aotearoa
Poland	Rzecznik Pieszych w Bydgoszczy
Norway	La oss ta fortauene tilbake
Portugal	Associação de Cidadãos Auto-Mobilizados (ACA-M)
Serbia	5km/h
Spain	A Pie
Spain	Catalunya Camina
Spain	La Zancada
Spain	Peatones Sevilla
Spain	Andando
Sweden	The Swedish Pedestrian Association (FOT)
Switzerland	Fussverkehr Schweiz
Switzerland	Fussgaengerverein Zurich
Taiwan	Vision Zero Taiwan
Turkey	Yaya Derneği
Ukraine	Pishohid – Ukrainian Pedestrian Association
UK	Living Streets
UK	Walk Unlimited
USA	America Walks
Zambia	PAPECA
EU	FEPA

== Activities ==
=== Policy and advocacy ===
The IFP engages in policy advocacy at local, national, and international levels to promote walking as a central component of sustainable and equitable transport systems. Its work addresses issues such as pedestrian safety, accessibility, public space design, and the integration of walking into broader mobility and urban development strategies.

The organisation’s advocacy is aligned with approaches such as Vision Zero, Safe System Approach and Road Danger Reduction, emphasising the prevention of fatalities and serious injuries among pedestrians through systemic changes in infrastructure, regulation, and governance.

In 2026, IFP published a policy framework titled Streets for People: Policies for the Decade of Sustainable Transport (2026–2035), which sets out a series of priority actions aimed at improving conditions for walking globally. The framework addresses areas such as governance, funding, street design, safety, and the role of walking in climate and public health agendas.

The document outlines policy recommendations including the allocation of dedicated funding for walking, the rebalancing of street space, and the integration of pedestrian needs into transport and urban planning systems. It is intended to contribute to international discussions on sustainable mobility and the implementation of the United Nations Decade of Sustainable Transport.

=== Research and knowledge production ===
The organisation contributes to research on walking and urban environments, including participation in international collaborative projects and the production of reports and policy-oriented publications.

Its work addresses topics such as:

- Walkability and accessibility
- Street design and public space quality
- Social and spatial inequalities in mobility
- Health and environmental benefits of walking

IFP has been involved in research and innovation initiatives under the Horizon Europe framework such as MORE, UPPER, REALLOCATE and JUST STREETS.

=== Tools and methods ===
IFP develops and promotes tools to support the analysis and improvement of pedestrian environments. These include participatory and data-driven approaches such as walk audits, walk-along interviews, and mapping methodologies.

These tools are used to gather evidence on pedestrian conditions and to support inclusive and participatory urban planning processes.

- Walk audits: structured assessments of pedestrian conditions conducted in situ, typically involving local residents, practitioners, and decision-makers. These audits evaluate aspects such as sidewalk quality, crossing safety, accessibility, and environmental conditions. They are used both as diagnostic tools and as participatory processes that enable communities to articulate priorities and identify barriers to walking.
- Walk-along interviews: qualitative methods in which participants move through an environment while discussing their experiences of walking. This approach allows for the collection of context-specific insights into perceptions of safety, comfort, accessibility, and inclusion. Variations of the method include participant-led routes and fixed-route assessments, and it is often used to capture the experiences of specific groups, such as older people, children, or persons with disabilities.
- Participatory mapping and countermapping: used to document and visualise pedestrian experiences and spatial inequalities. These may include cognitive mapping, mobility diaries, and counter-mapping techniques that highlight routes, barriers, and areas of concern from the perspective of users. Such approaches are often employed to complement quantitative data and to support inclusive planning processes.
- Mobility diaries: used to record individuals’ daily movement patterns, travel behaviours, and experiences over a defined period of time. Participants document routes taken, modes used, durations, and perceived challenges or barriers encountered while walking. This approach provides longitudinal and experiential data that can reveal patterns of accessibility, time use, and mobility inequalities, particularly among underrepresented groups. Mobility diaries are often used in combination with other participatory and qualitative methods to enrich the understanding of everyday mobility practices.
- 3D Lidar SidewalkScanner: developed by IFP to collect and analyse detailed spatial data on pedestrian infrastructure using 3D LiDAR scanning technologies. The approach produces high-resolution point cloud data that can be used to measure and evaluate characteristics of the pedestrian environment, including sidewalk width, surface conditions, gradients, obstacles, and the presence of street furniture.The method is designed to support evidence-based assessments of accessibility and walkability, particularly in relation to the needs of persons with disabilities and other vulnerable users. By generating objective and visual representations of public space, SidewalkScanner enables both technical analysis and broader communication with stakeholders, including planners, policymakers, and community groups.The tool has been applied in different urban contexts as part of research and innovation projects focused on street design, accessibility, and the reallocation of public space.
- Nudge30: Nudge30 is an intervention concept focused on influencing driver behaviour through street design. It is based on the idea that physical and visual characteristics of streets can encourage lower vehicle speeds, particularly around 30 km/h, without relying solely on enforcement. The approach draws on behavioural insights and urban design principles to create environments that are perceived as shared or pedestrian-oriented, thereby contributing to improved safety conditions.

== See also ==
- Alternatives to car use
- Carfree city
- Car-free movement
- Environmental planning
- Green transport hierarchy
- Living Streets Aotearoa
- Mobility transition
- New Urbanism
- Pedestrian village
- Pedestrian zone
- Permeability (spatial and transport planning)
- Principles of intelligent urbanism
- Reclaim the Streets
- Shared space
- Street reclamation
- Transit-oriented development
- Transportation planning
- Urban planning
- Urban renaissance
- Urban resilience
- Urban vitality
- Walkability
- Walking audit
- Walking city
