= Melissa Bruntlett =

Canadian author and mobility advocate

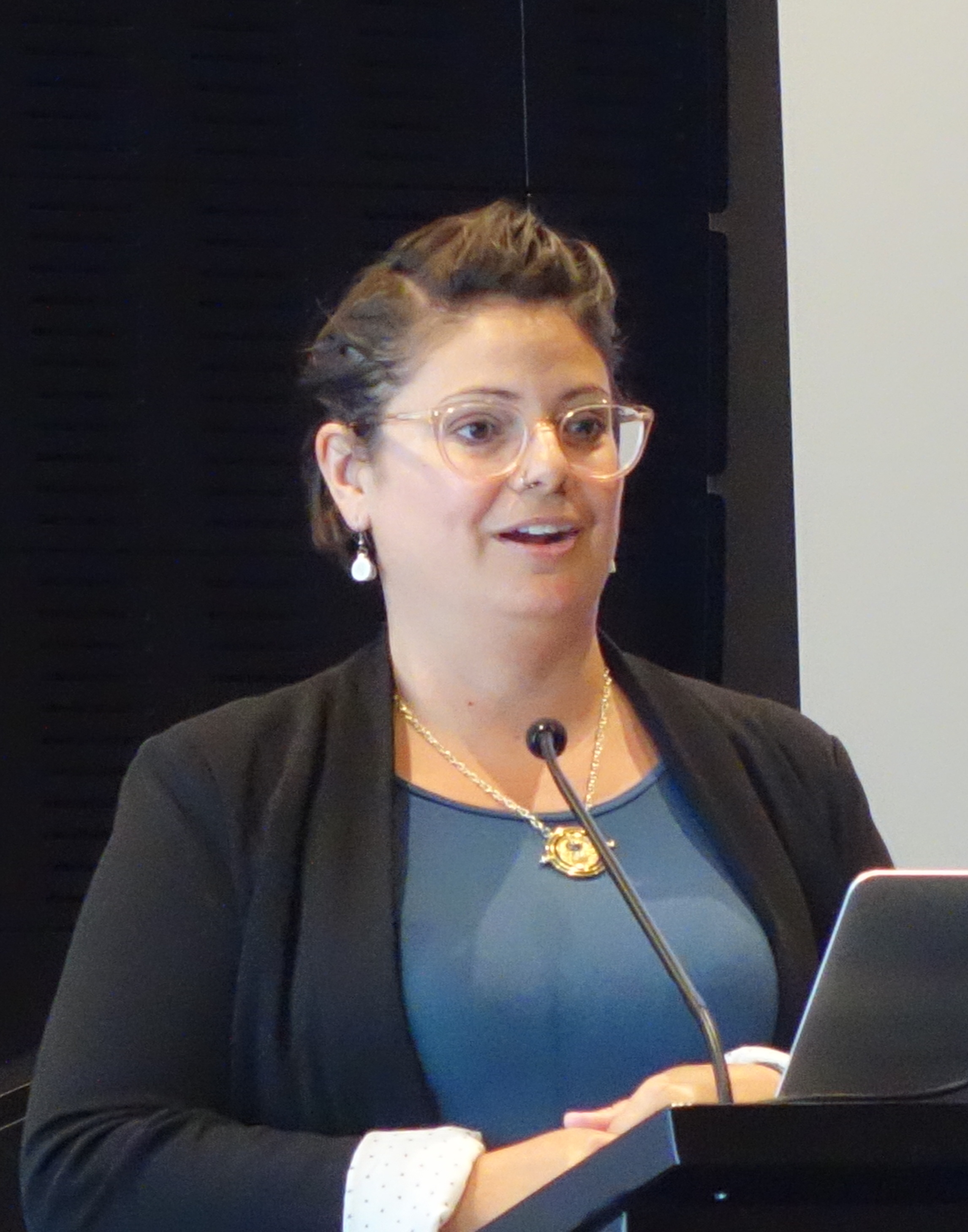
- Bruntlett in 2018
- Education: Toronto Metropolitan University (BDes)
- Spouse: Chris Bruntlett
- Children: 2

Melissa Bruntlett is a Canadian author and mobility advocate, based in the Netherlands.

== Career ==
In 2014, Melissa and her husband Chris Bruntlett launched Modacity, a content creation channel focused on cycling.

In 2018, Melissa and Chris published Building the Cycling City: The Dutch Blueprint for Urban Vitality on Dutch cycling culture.

In 2021, Melissa and Chris published Curbing Traffic: The Human Case for Fewer Cars in Our Lives focusing on designing streets that prioritize pedestrians and cyclists.

In 2025, Melissa and Chris published Women Changing Cities: Global Stories of Urban Transformation profiling women leaders of cities, including Valérie Plante and Anne Hidalgo.

== Personal life ==
Melissa's husband Chris Bruntlett is the International Relations Manager for the Dutch Cycling Embassy.

== Publications ==
- Building the Cycling City: The Dutch Blueprint for Urban Vitality (2018)
- Curbing Traffic: The Human Case for Fewer Cars in Our Lives (2021)
- Women Changing Cities: Global Stories of Urban Transformation (2025)
