= Bike On =

Bike On NZ is a not-for-profit organisation in New Zealand that aims to encourage more New Zealanders to cycle. It was started by Paul McArdle and Meg Frater in November 2009, and initially started with 'Bikes in schools' programs that provided bicycles and bicycle tracks on primary school grounds to allow children to learn to ride bikes – with many of the children involved having no cycling experience at all, and with many of the parents of the children being too concerned about their safety to allow them to ride bicycles on public roads. The organisation has since branched out into a variety of other cycling promotion and advocacy, including providing bicycles to encourage 'police on bikes' schemes.

The Bikes in Schools programme eventually gained the support of Prime Minister John Key, who helped open one of the projects after the Hawke's Bay pilot project was initially deemed a success. The mostly sponsor-supported project has expanded to include schools in the Auckland area.
