= Bike Auckland =

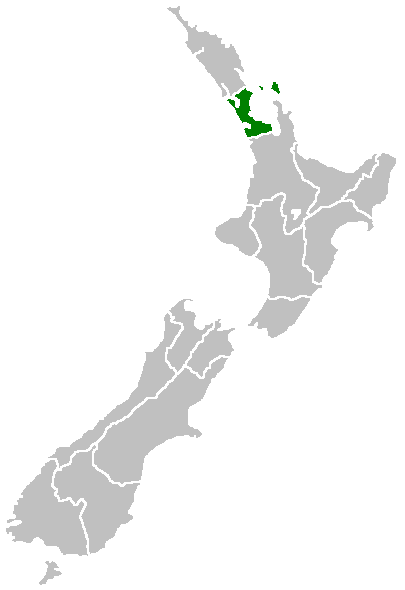
- Auckland Region
- Abbreviation: BikeAKL
- Formation: 1998
- Type: NGO
- Legal status: Incorporated Society & Registered Charity
- Purpose: Advocacy
- Headquarters: Auckland, New Zealand
- Region served: Auckland
- Members: Private persons
- Official language: English
- Chair: Karen Hormann
- Chief Biking Officer: Fiáin d'Leafy
- Website: https://www.bikeauckland.org.nz/

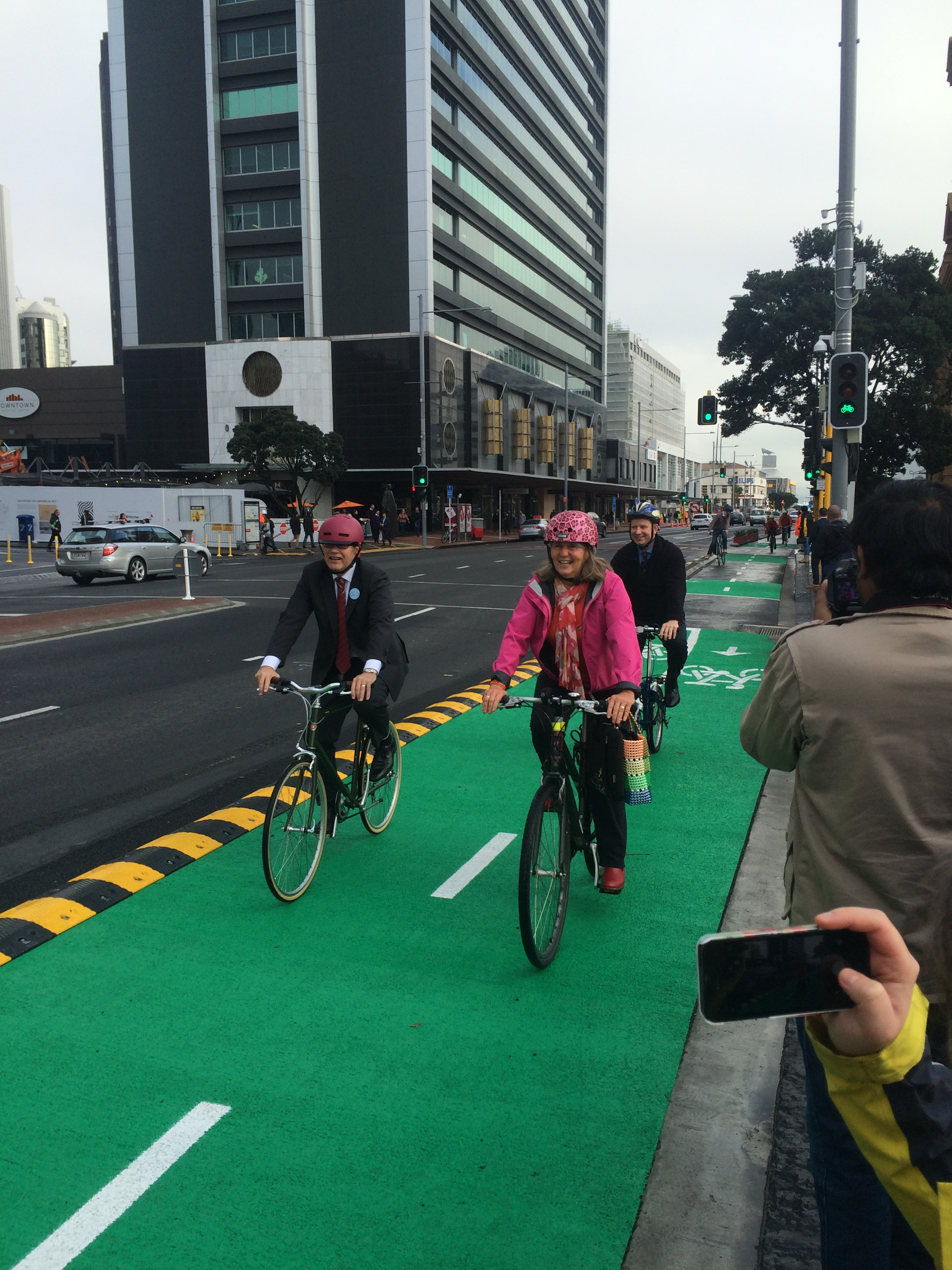
Former Bike Auckland chair Barbara Cuthbert at the opening of the Quay Street Cycleway in 2016.

Bike Auckland (Bike AKL), formerly Cycle Action Auckland (CAA) is a pro-cycling advocacy group in Auckland, New Zealand. The predominantly volunteer group aims to improve infrastructure and conditions, as well as perceptions of cycling to encourage more "everyday people" to use bicycles, including for commuting and recreation.

Affiliated with Cycling Action Network, the group focuses on Auckland, New Zealand's largest city. The group also more generally calls for increased funding for cycling infrastructure and safety measures.

The first chair (up until 2008) was Bevan Woodward. The chair from 2008 to 2021 was Barbara Cuthbert. The chair from 2021 to 2023 was Tony Mitchell. The current chair as of September 2024 is Karen Hormann.

== Activities ==
Campaigns and projects of Bike Auckland include working with Auckland Council to improve safety for cyclists and other users on Auckland's main roads, such as Tamaki Drive (one of the major cycling routes of Auckland, which also saw some high-profile accidents), working with the NZ Transport Agency on improvements to the Northwestern Cycleway and other cycleway projects along motorways, such as the Waikaraka Cycleway sections around the new Manukau Harbour Bridge at Onehunga.

In early 2010, the group also successfully helped convince North Shore City Council to retain the Lake Road cycle lanes after opponents had been campaigning for their removal, and had gotten over 2000 signatures against the lanes. An even larger counter-petition, as well as expert opinions on the efficacy of the lanes, were eventually successful in retaining them, and having cycling improvements included during further Lake Road upgrades.

During 2010–2011, Bike Auckland (then Cycle Action Auckland) submitted in the Board of Inquiry approvals process for the Waterview Connection motorway project as a submitter and participated in transport and open space discussions with expert witnesses. The Board praised Bike Auckland's 'detailed' and 'thoughtful' evidence and submission work. The Board eventually decided to favour arguments in support of a cycleway as part of the Waterview project, and had $8 million set aside towards construction.

Between 2012 and 2015, Bike Auckland advocated for the conversion of the old Nelson Street motorway off-ramp to a new walk and cycleway, which was opened in late 2015.

Another long-term aim is to get a cycle route crossing the Auckland Harbour Bridge, achieving a connection between the North Shore and the Auckland CBD, which at the moment do not have any cycle route connections between them save for bike transport via ferries. While there are close links, the GetAcross campaign is distinct from Bike Auckland.

=== Meetings and events ===
The group conducts regular meetings with Auckland Transport to discuss cycling infrastructure, and supports a number of affiliated events and groups, such as with Frocks on Bikes, Campaign for Better Transport and other sustainability initiatives. It also organises pro-cycling rallies such as the 'Bikes for Life' event and cycling culture events such as Biketober.

In 2011, Cycle Action Auckland helped organise, together with Auckland Transport and NZ Transport Agency, the TelstraClear Challenge cycle race and community cycling festival, including rides over the Auckland Harbour Bridge and on the Northern Busway. The event took place 11 December.

On the 2024 edition of World Day of Remembrance for Road Traffic Victims, 17 November 2024, Bike Auckland created the Ghost Bike Art Installation in a central Auckland square. 59 ghost bikes represented lives lost on New Zealand roads in the previous five years.

=== Cycle mapping ===
Together with ARTA, Cycle Action produced a comprehensive set of cycling maps for the Auckland Region in the late 2000s. They also cooperated with Fullers360 to produce a similar map for Waiheke Island.

== Awards ==
The group won a Cycle Friendly Award in 2004 for its commuter challenge held earlier that year.

== See also ==
- Cycling in Auckland
- Cycle Action Network
- Spokes Canterbury
- All Aboard Aotearoa
- Greater Auckland
