= Axel Downard-Wilke =

New Zealand transport planner and engineer

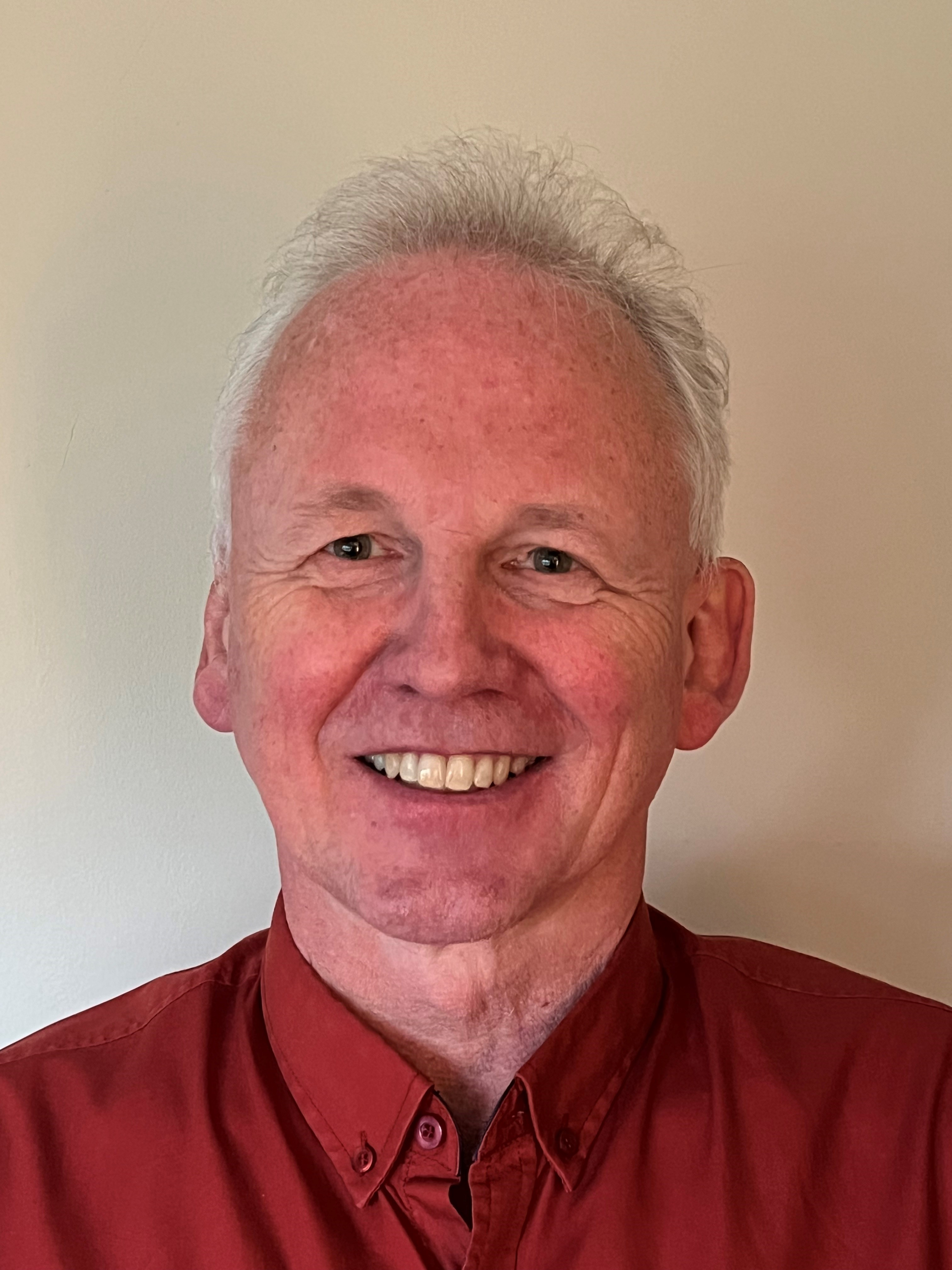
- Downard-Wilke in 2025
- Born: Axel Peter Carl Wilke; 1966 (age 59–60); West Germany
- Citizenship: New Zealander
- Education: University of Canterbury
- Occupation: Transport planner
- Employer: ViaStrada
- Downard-Wilke's voice recorded July 2024

Axel Peter Carl Downard-Wilke (né Wilke; born 1966) is a New Zealand transport planner and engineer known for his advocacy for cyclists in cities. Born in Germany, he moved to New Zealand for his education, and from 1997 to 2005 he worked for the Christchurch City Council as a traffic engineer, where he became involved in various projects to improve the safety of cycling in the city. He then co-established a consultancy firm practising in the areas of traffic engineering, transportation planning and town planning. Downard-Wilke was a member of the technical team for the New Zealand Cycle Trail Project, and one of the lead authors of the New Zealand Cycle Trail Design Guide first published in February 2010.

Following a coronial inquiry into the safety of cycling, Downard-Wilke was appointed as one of ten independent experts for a Cycling Safety Panel. The recommendations of the Cycling Safety Panel led on to the development of a 2016 framework, Cycling network guidance – planning and design. Downard-Wilke has been a consistent advocate for urban planners to specifically provide for walking, cycling and public transport in cities. In addition to his work as a transport planner, Downard-Wilke is a Wikipedia editor and administrator. He has been involved in campaigns to improve coverage of New Zealand-related topics on Wikipedia, and has been a member of the management committee of the New Zealand affiliate of the Wikimedia Foundation.

== Personal life ==
Wilke was born in Germany and lived in Exter and Hanover. He ran his parents' supermarket until he was 24, then began a degree in civil engineering, before moving to New Zealand and completing his degree at the University of Canterbury. He graduated with a Bachelor of Engineering degree with first-class honours in 1997, and returned to the university part-time to complete a Master of Engineering degree, graduating in 2002. Wilke married in New Zealand in 2011, later changing his surname from Wilke to Downard-Wilke.

In 2021, Downard-Wilke moved from Christchurch to Golden Bay / Mohua.

== Career ==
Downard-Wilke worked at Christchurch City Council for eight years from 1997 to 2005. In 2000, in his capacity as a traffic engineer with the council, Downard-Wilke designed a cycle detection system to overcome a problem faced by Christchurch cyclists: some Christchurch intersections are so wide that a cyclist can have difficulty negotiating the intersection before cross traffic starts up. Downard-Wilke's idea was to place detector loops under the road where cyclists would pass. If the loop detected that a cyclist was travelling too slowly to reach the other side during the green phase, the system would delay the light change for a few seconds.

While still with Christchurch City Council, Downard-Wilke won an award for 'Best Cycling Promotion' at the Cycling Advocates' Network (CAN) Cycle-Friendly Awards in 2005. The award was for a Planning and Design for Cycling training course for transport professionals, to improve their understanding of planning a cycle-friendly environment. The training course was created in 2003 under Downard-Wilke's leadership, and has evolved over the years. The course passed its twentieth anniversary in 2023.

Downard-Wilke and business partner Warren Lloyd started a company named Traffix in 2005. The company had expertise in traffic signals, and specialised in designing streets for pedestrians, cyclists and public transport. In 2007, Traffix merged with another company to form ViaStrada. ViaStrada operates in the fields of traffic engineering, transportation planning, town planning and project management. The company offers professional training to engineers and planners in traffic-related fields.

Downard-Wilke was appointed as a project engineer on the technical team for the government's $100 million New Zealand Cycle Trail project which began in 2009 with the aim of building cycle trails all over New Zealand. He was one of the lead authors of the New Zealand Cycle Trail Design Guide, first published in February 2010.

In 2013, Downard-Wilke was selected by the New Zealand Transport Agency (Waka Kotahi) as one of ten independent experts for a Cycling Safety Panel established in response to a coronial enquiry into the safety of cycling. The report of the Cycling Safety Panel was published in 2014. The Transport Agency has subsequently published multiple updates of progress against the action plan developed in response to the Cycling Safety Panel report. In the book Planning for Walking and Cycling in New Zealand published in 2020, Roger Boulter describes the work of the Cycling Safety Panel as "effectively formulating the government’s strategy on cycling".

== Cycling advocacy ==
Downard-Wilke has a long-standing interest in cycling, both as a cyclist and as a traffic engineer. He used to cycle 2.5 kilometres (1.6 mi) to primary school, and in 1993 won a 5 kilometres (3.1 miles) cycling race in Vlotho, Germany. Downard-Wilke served on the executive committee of the Cycling Advocates Network (CAN) from 2000 until 2009. In October 2008, he was elected co-chairperson (along with Glen Koorey), serving in the position for one year.

Downard-Wilke has been an advocate for cycling in centres other than Christchurch. In 2021, he was publicly critical of Wellington City Council for their failure to provide safer routes for cycling in the city. After his move to Golden Bay / Mohua, he became involved in transport-related matters in the region, taking up the role of chairperson of the Golden Bay Cycle and Walkways Society.

== Christchurch urban transport ==
In 1999, Downard-Wilke urged Local Government in New Zealand to give priority to forms of transport other than cars, and to specifically provide for walking, cycling and public transport. He noted that in Christchurch, 45% of journeys are of less than five kilometres (3.1 mi), yet only 8.7% of journeys are by bicycle, whereas in some European cities of similar size to Christchurch, cycling is far more common. Downard-Wilke also argued for reduced speed zones, to make cities safer for pedestrians.

In 2018, Downard-Wilke called for a section of Colombo Street, a main road through the centre of Christchurch, to be closed to traffic and converted into a pedestrian mall. The rationale was to reduce the traffic that was causing congestion on the rest of the street and improve access for buses travelling to the Bus Interchange. The proposal received 59% support in an online poll by the Stuff website, but Christchurch City Council said it preferred to continue with its current plan and "let things settle".

In 2018/19, Downard-Wilke was part of a group advocating for integrated planning for land use and housing in Christchurch, with an emphasis on passenger rail. The group held a series of public workshops to present opportunities for housing and improved public transport based on relocation and redevelopment of the Middleton rail yards.

In 2019, Downard-Wilke worked with groups in northern Christchurch advocating for mitigation of the local effects of the planned Christchurch Northern Corridor, a 12-kilometre (7.5 mi) extension of the Christchurch Northern Motorway. Downard-Wilke has pointed out that urban sprawl and the establishment of remote settlements around Christchurch led to many people driving cars into town for work, thereby creating additional transport emissions for the foreseeable future. He has also highlighted the lack of adequate public transport in Christchurch, describing it as the largest city in Australasia without mass rapid transit.

== Political career ==
In 2019, Downard-Wilke stood alongside incumbent councillor Lan Pham for the Christchurch Central/Ōhoko constituency in the local-body elections for the Canterbury regional government body Environment Canterbury (ECan) held that year. He said he was motivated by the climate crisis and wanted to improve public transport and reduce greenhouse gas emissions. Downard-Wilke placed fifth of seven candidates, with two elected.

As of 2023, Downard-Wilke was a member of the Green Party.

Downard-Wilke ran as an independent candidate for a seat on the Tasman District Council in the Golden Bay ward during the local elections of 2025. Although unsuccessful in that race, he did win a seat on the Golden Bay community board.

== Wikipedia ==
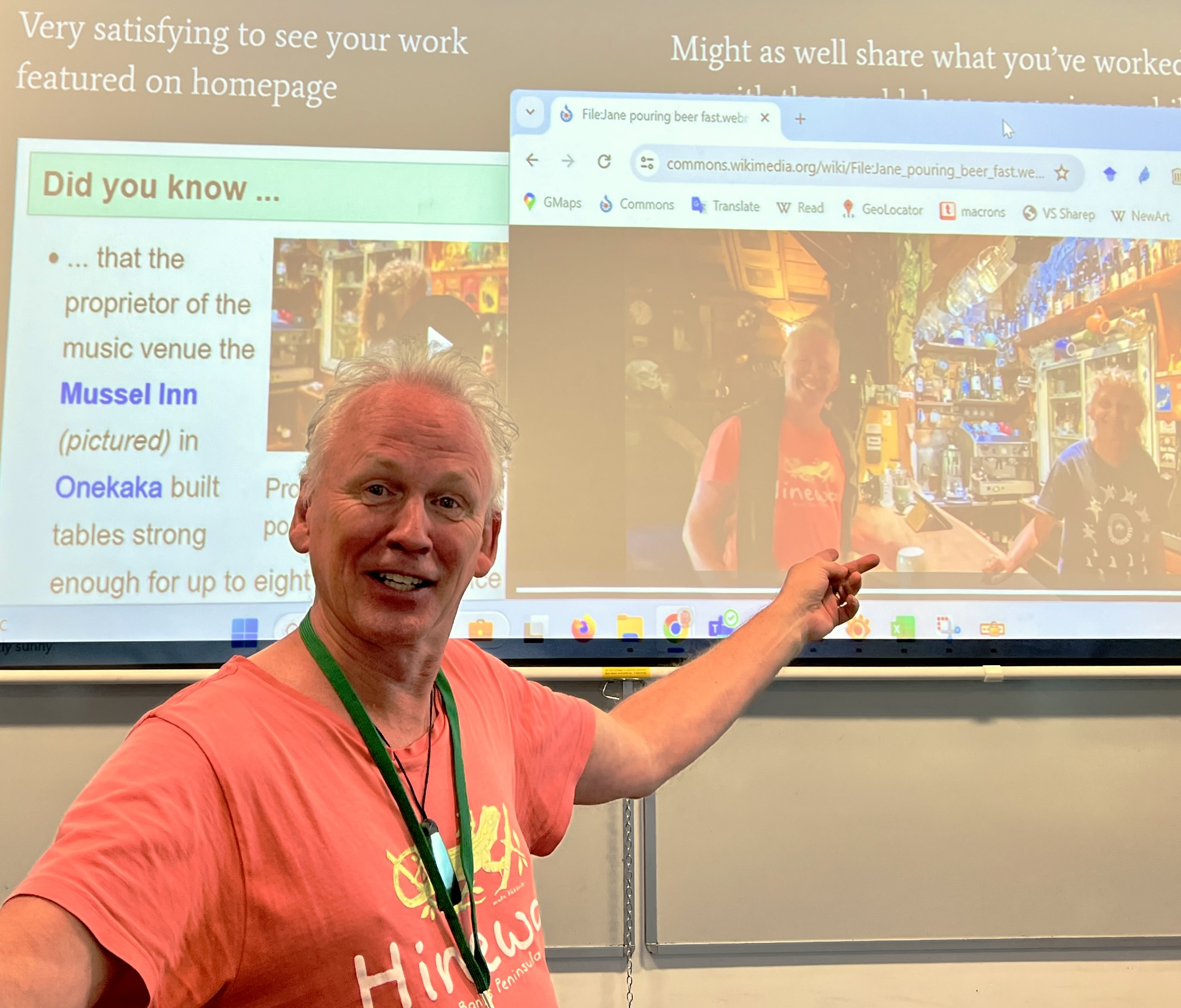
Axel Downard-Wilke presenting on Wikipedia's homepage while the homepage featured a video he was in

Downard-Wilke has written around 1800 articles since becoming involved in the Wikipedia community in 2009, and is one of four New Zealand-based Wikipedia administrators from a worldwide total of around 860 (as at 2024).

In 2020, Downard-Wilke led a campaign to have macrons used in Māori place names in Wikipedia articles. Since 2007, Wikipedia editors had debated whether or not macrons should be used, and there was no consistency among articles or editors. In 2019, the New Zealand Geographic Board added macrons to about 300 place names, so Downard-Wilke suggested that Māori place names be written with macrons in those cases where the New Zealand Geographic Board uses them. This suggestion was adopted in 2020 after a vote by interested editors, and around 300 place names were then changed in Wikipedia articles.

As of 2024, Downard-Wilke is a member of the management committee of Wikimedia Aotearoa New Zealand, an affiliate of the Wikimedia Foundation.

== Selected publications ==
- Wilke, Axel; Appleton, Ian (March 2005). "Audit of signalised intersections in New Zealand – Recommendations for Practitioners". Road & Transport Research. 14 (1). ProQuest 215247969.
- Downard-Wilke, Axel; Woodward, Alistair; Gerlach, Jürgen (2017). "Safe … but only if it's efficient". Asia-Pacific Cycle Congress 2017. Christchurch – via ViaStrada.
- Hughes, Tim; Downard-Wilke, Axel; Gregory, Megan (2017). "Around about time to make cycle-friendly roundabouts?". Asia-Pacific Cycle Congress 2017. Christchurch – via ViaStrada.
- Downard-Wilke, Axel (2018). "Parking policy – the San Francisco experience". Transportation Conference 2018. Queenstown – via ViaStrada.
- Gregory, Megan; Downard-Wilke, Axel; Dejong, Steve (2019). "Directional cycle signals". Transportation Conference 2019. Wellington – via ViaStrada.
- Downard-Wilke, Axel (2020). "Zone 0". Transportation Conference 2020. Christchurch – via ViaStrada.
- Downard-Wilke, Axel (17–19 March 2021). "Blind driveways". 2WALKandCYCLE Conference 2021. Dunedin – via ViaStrada.
- Downard-Wilke, Axel; Lieswyn, John; Lloyd, Warren; Gregory, Megan (2022). "Why don't we build safe roundabouts?". Australasian Road Safety Conference 2022. Christchurch – via ViaStrada.

== Sources ==
- Boulter, Roger (2020). Planning for Walking and Cycling in New Zealand (PDF).
