= Living Streets Aotearoa =

Living Streets Aotearoa Inc. is the New Zealand organisation for people on foot, promoting walking-friendly communities. Living Streets Aotearoa is the national walking advocacy group with the vision of "more people choosing to walk more often."

It promotes the concept of living streets, the use of roads for functions other than just vehicle access. The organisation is a voting member of the International Federation of Pedestrians.

== History ==
Celia Wade-Brown, the inaugural President from 2002 to 2009, noticed that drivers, cyclists and government agencies met to discuss road safety, modal shift and funding but that pedestrians and trampers were not part of the discussion. The organisation was founded to ensure that the voice of people on foot was heard, and evolved from Walk Wellington which was set up in 1998 by a group of Wellingtonians with an interest in the rights of pedestrians and the benefits of walking. Living Streets Aotearoa was incorporated in 2002.

The joint advocacy of Living Streets Aotearoa and cycle groups was pivotal in creating Getting there - on foot, by cycle - the New Zealand Walking and Cycling Strategy in 2005 and its subsequent (although at present only partial) implementation.

There is a national executive committee and several local groups which advocate walking.

The organisation received direct government funding until a change of government in 2008. It now relies entirely on subscription and grants.

Funding for walking and pedestrian improvements is only available at local government level in New Zealand, and competes with many other priorities. The Local Government New Zealand discussion of the complex arrangements for funding transport sets out some of the issues.

== Main activities ==
Living Streets works to develop walking-friendly communities throughout New Zealand and to promote the social, environmental, health and economic benefits of walking as a means of transport and recreation. Living Streets exists because the diverse needs and aspirations of people on foot are often overlooked. Walking is not consistently or fully integrated into decision-making in transport, urban design, public health and community development planning. Submissions on many policies and plans are a key activity and are made to national, local and other agencies to promote walkability and pedestrian friendly environments.

Promotion of the International Walking Charter has resulted in several local government councils adopting it and agreed Walking Policies or plans.

A biennial NZ walking conference was held in 2006, 2008 and 2010. The conference was combined with the NZ Cycling Conference in 2012, with subsequent joint "2WALKandCYCLE" conferences held in 2014, 2016, 2018, 2021 and 2024.

Biennial Golden Foot Awards have been presented at the biennial conferences.

Several campaigns to improve walkability include calls to

- change the legislation to make vehicle users give way to pedestrians when turning

- re-signpost roads so that pedestrian exits are clearly marked

Living Streets Aotearoa supports the proposed new walkway across the Auckland Harbour Bridge - Skypath.

== See also ==
- Public transport in New Zealand
- Te Araroa national walkway
- Federated Mountain Clubs of NZ
