= Arapuni Suspension Bridge =

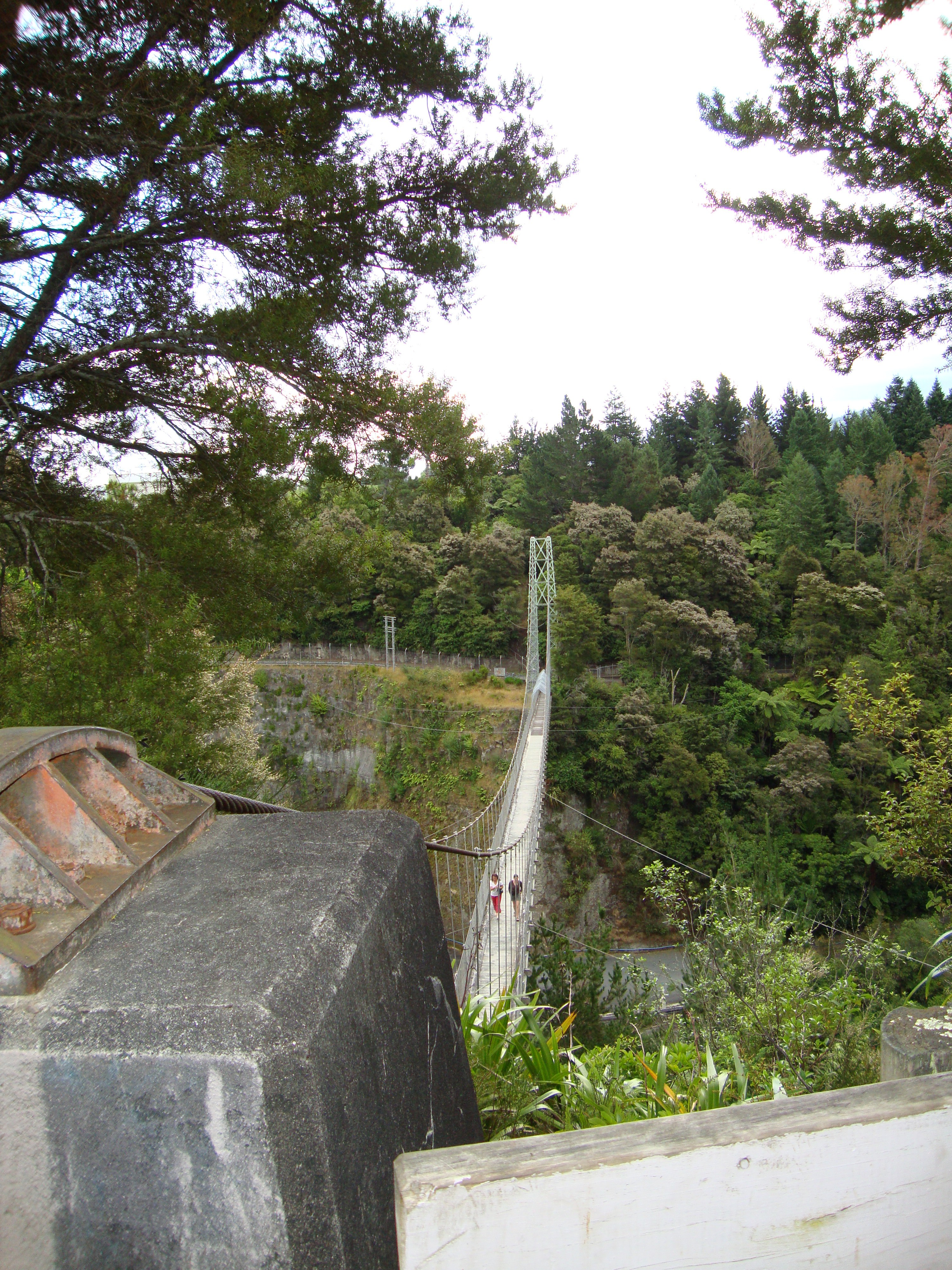
- Arapuni Suspension Bridge, with the photo taken from the true right of the Waikato River
- Coordinates: 38.0706°S 175.6445°E
- Carries: Pedestrians and cyclists
- Crosses: Waikato River
- Locale: South Waikato District
- Heritage status: – Category II NZHPT – Category II

Characteristics
- Design: Suspension bridge
- Material: Steel cables Steel lattice tower Timber deck
- Total length: 152.4 m
- Width: 1.57 m (between handrails)
- No. of spans: One
- Piers in water: Nil
- Clearance below: 54 m

History
- Designer: David Rowell & Co.
- Constructed by: Armstrong Whitworth
- Construction start: May 1925
- Construction end: 1926

Heritage New Zealand – Category 2
- Designated: 21 April 1994
- Reference no.: 4168

The Arapuni Suspension Bridge is located just downstream from the Arapuni Power Station on the Waikato River in the South Waikato District of New Zealand. The 152-metre (499 ft) suspension bridge in the bush-lined gorge was built in the mid-1920s to allow workers from the village of Arapuni to access the power station construction site.

== History ==
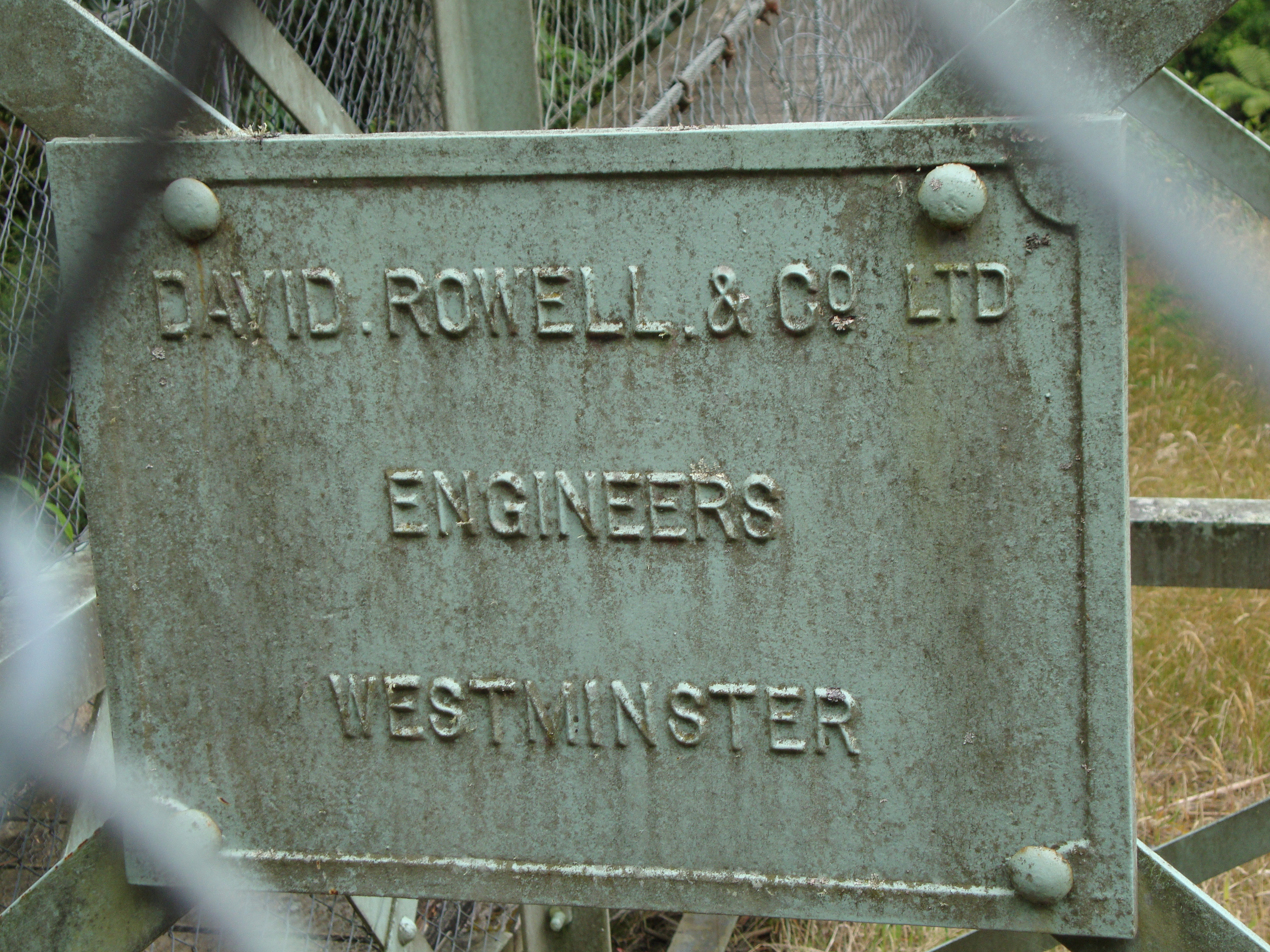
Plaque commemorating the bridge engineer

The bridge spans the Arapuni gorge about 1.5 kilometres (0.93 mi) downstream from the Arapuni Dam. As it was a relatively simple ancillary structure associated with what at the time was New Zealand's largest civil engineering project, the suspension bridge itself received little mention in progress reports and media accounts. Construction started in May 1925 and finished sometime in the three months after April 1926. The bridge does not seem to have had a formal opening function.

The bridge connected "top camp" (which eventually became the Arapuni township) with the western side of the gorge. "Top camp" accommodated the workmen employed on construction of the spillway, powerhouse and penstock.

The bridge was registered a Category II historic place by the Historic Places Trust on 21 April 1994.

=== Engineering ===
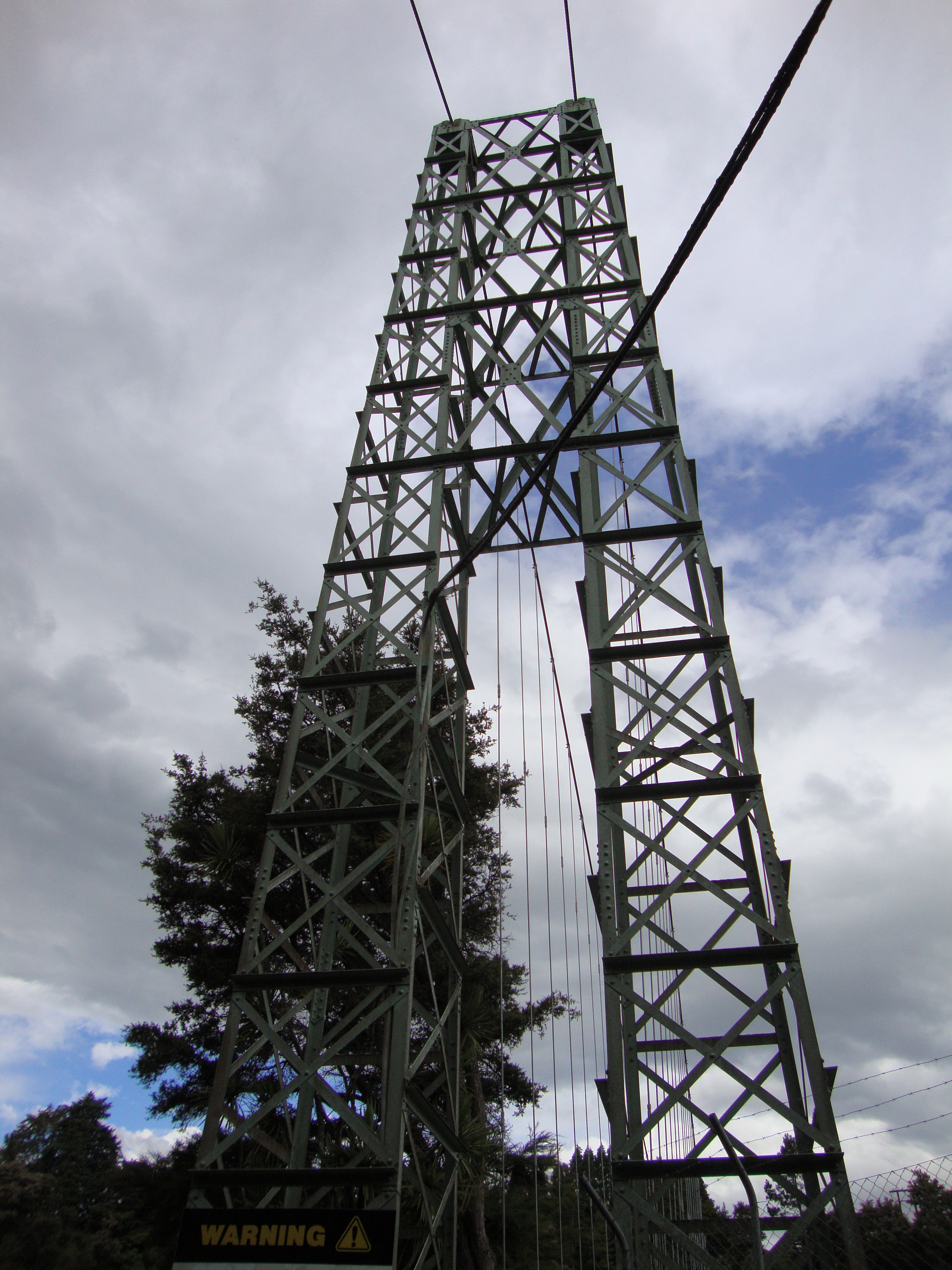
Steel lattice tower of the bridge on the true left of the Waikato River

The bridge was designed by David Rowell & Co. from Westminster, London. The structure is likely to have been shipped prefabricated from England, and was erected by the British contractors for the Arapuni dam and power station project, Armstrong Whitworth. It is one of the longest suspension footbridges in the country. The bridge has a span of 152.4 metres (500 ft) and is 8 metres (26 ft) higher when measured from true left (i.e. the left side when looking downriver) to true right. It has a high steel lattice tower on the true left. On the true right, the bridge footing is cut into the side of the river bank and the foundation for the suspension cables is built on top of the cliff.

== Today ==
The bridge is a popular tourist destination. The site can be accessed via a walkway starting on Arapuni Road opposite Rabone Street.

Bridge users are rewarded with views of the scenic gorge. Geological features can be seen, and the cliffs on the true right of the landing are of volcanic origin and formed by ignimbrite blocks, which are vertically fissured by cooling stresses.

The bridge is sometimes called the Arapuni Swing Bridge, for example on signs along the walkway to the bridge. In New Zealand, the term 'swing bridge' is commonly used to refer to suspension bridges that act as footbridges because they 'swing' as pedestrians walk across.

The Waikato River Trails, which is under construction as part of the New Zealand Cycle Trail, will pass the bridge on the true right of the Waikato River.

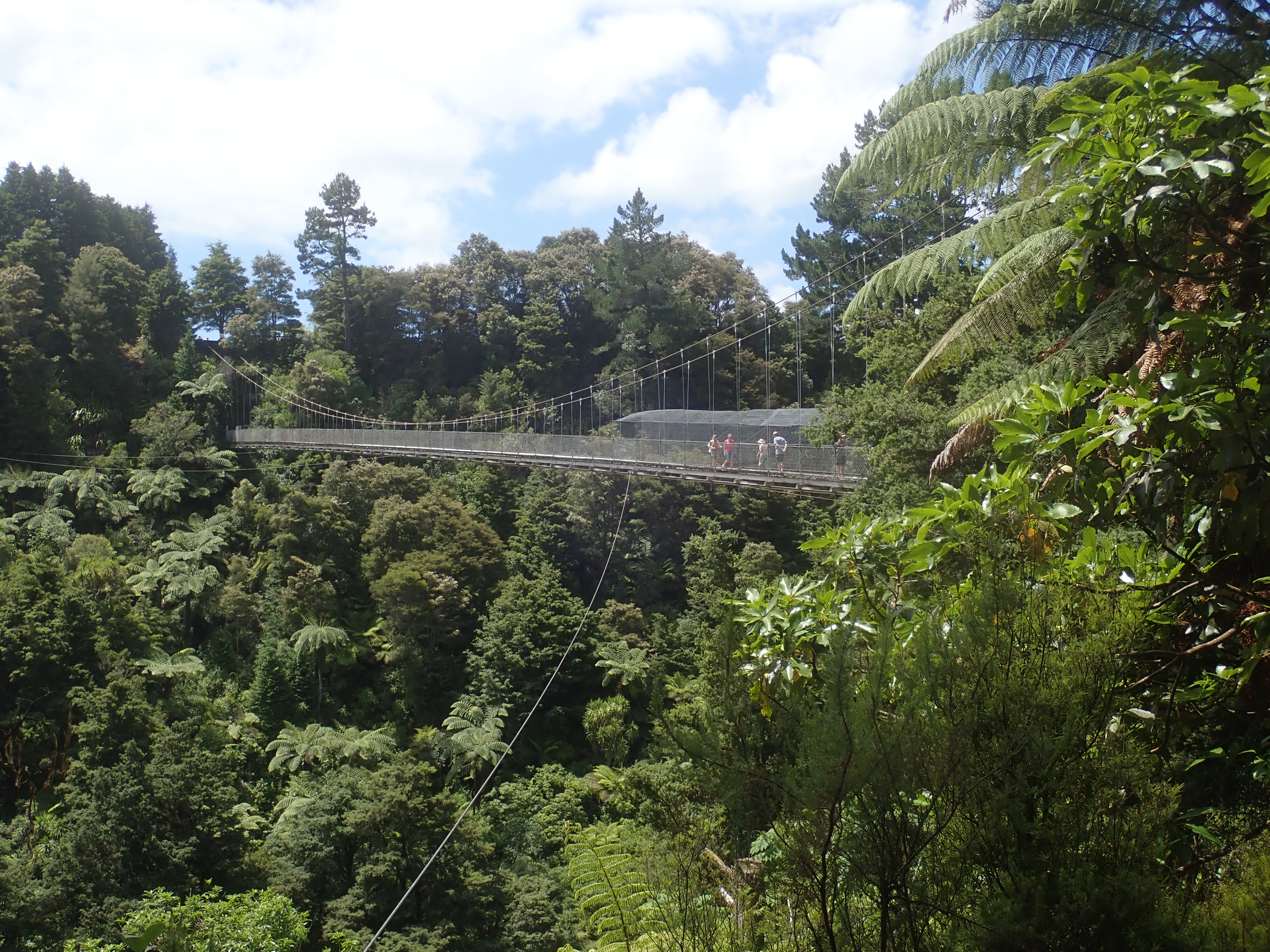
Arapuni Swing/Suspension Bridge taken from downstream on the true left of the river; stabilising cables are visible
