= Howley Bridge =

British Bridge spanning River Mersey

Coordinates: 53.3873°N 2.5787°W

The Howley Bridge is a pedestrian footbridge which spans the River Mersey in Warrington, England. It connects Howley in Warrington to Victoria Park in Latchford.

The bridge was constructed in 1912 (113 years ago) by the London-based David Rowell & Co. It is a suspension bridge, constructed primarily of wrought iron with steel suspension cables and a timber-planked walkway.

The bridge is similar in construction, appearance and properties to other bridges made by the company, such as Daly's Bridge. The Howley Bridge also shares the shakiness for which Daly's Bridge is known.

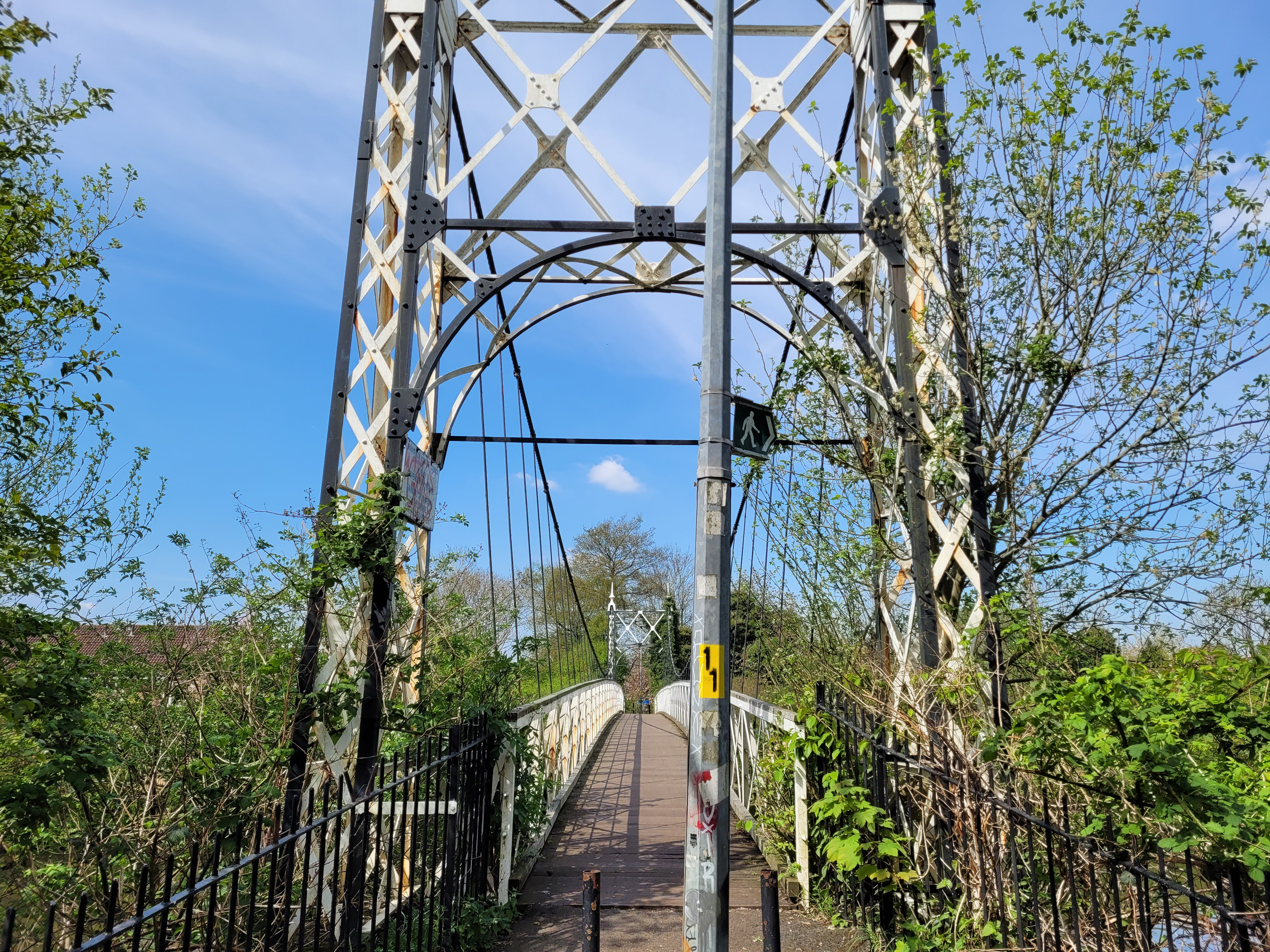
A view of the Howley Suspension bridge from the Victoria Park side facing towards Warrington Town Centre

The bridge received maintenance during the construction of the Warrington Flood defences.

The bridge is a registered Grade II listed building.
