= Arapuni Power Station =

Arapuni Dam
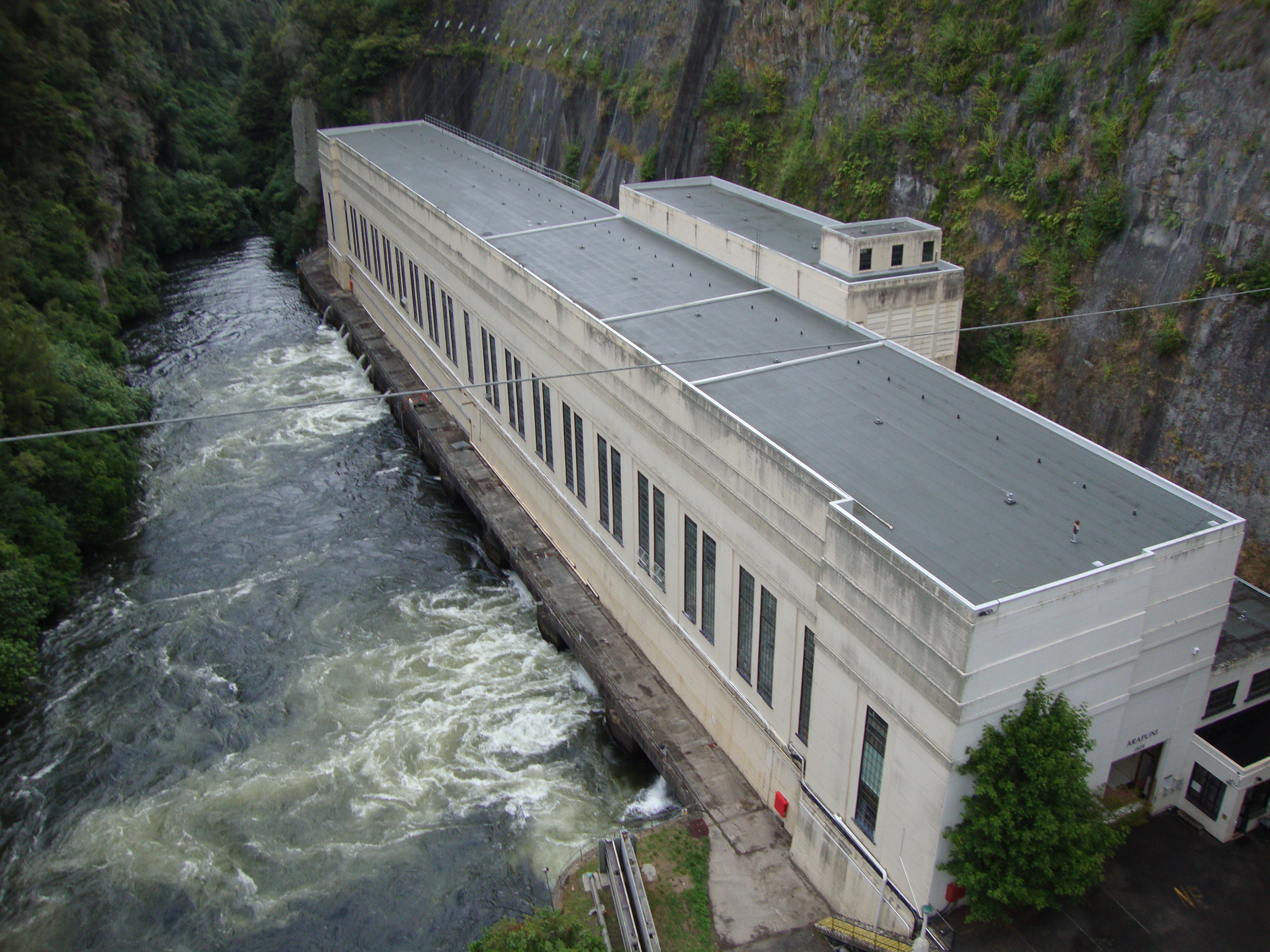
- Arapuni power station, as seen from the Arapuni Suspension Bridge

- Location within New Zealand
- Country: New Zealand
- Location: Lake Arapuni, Waikato River
- Coordinates: 38°4′17″S 175°38′36″E
- Purpose: Power
- Status: Operational
- Opening date: 1929

Dam and spillways
- Impounds: Waikato River

Reservoir
- Creates: Lake Arapuni

Arapuni Power Station
- Operator: Mercury Energy
- Turbines: 8× Francis turbines
- Installed capacity: 196 MW (263,000 hp)
- Annual generation: 805 GWh (2,900 TJ)

Arapuni Power Station is a hydroelectric power station on the Waikato River, in the North Island of New Zealand. It is owned and operated by Mercury Energy, and is the seventh and penultimate hydroelectric power station on the Waikato River. It is also the oldest currently generating, the first government-built, and the largest capacity single hydroelectric power station on the Waikato River. The two power houses that make up the Maraetai Power Station have a larger combined capacity however.

Arapuni, due to its proximity to Hamilton, plays an important part in voltage support and frequency keeping in the city and the wider Waikato region. Continuous improvement and refurbishment of the station's generation equipment ensures Arapuni remains efficient.

The powerhouse and dam at Arapuni are under protection of the Historic Places Trust, becoming Category I Historic Places in November 1987 and August 1991 respectively. It is one of the few generating power stations in New Zealand to be listed on the register.

== History ==
Arapuni was the first government-built hydroelectric station on the Waikato River, and the second after the privately owned Horahora Power Station that was decommissioned in 1947 on the filling of Lake Karapiro.

Initial surveying of the site began in 1916, but in 1920, the surveying was halted due to lack of government funds to progress the project. Construction of Arapuni finally began in 1924, but repeated heavy rain and the resulting floods dogged the early works. The station, complete with three turbines and provisions for a fourth, was commissioned in mid-1929. Shortly after commissioning, Arapuni was closed for two years while a water seepage problem was investigated and the headrace lined. The station, with the addition of a fourth turbine, was recommissioned in May 1932.

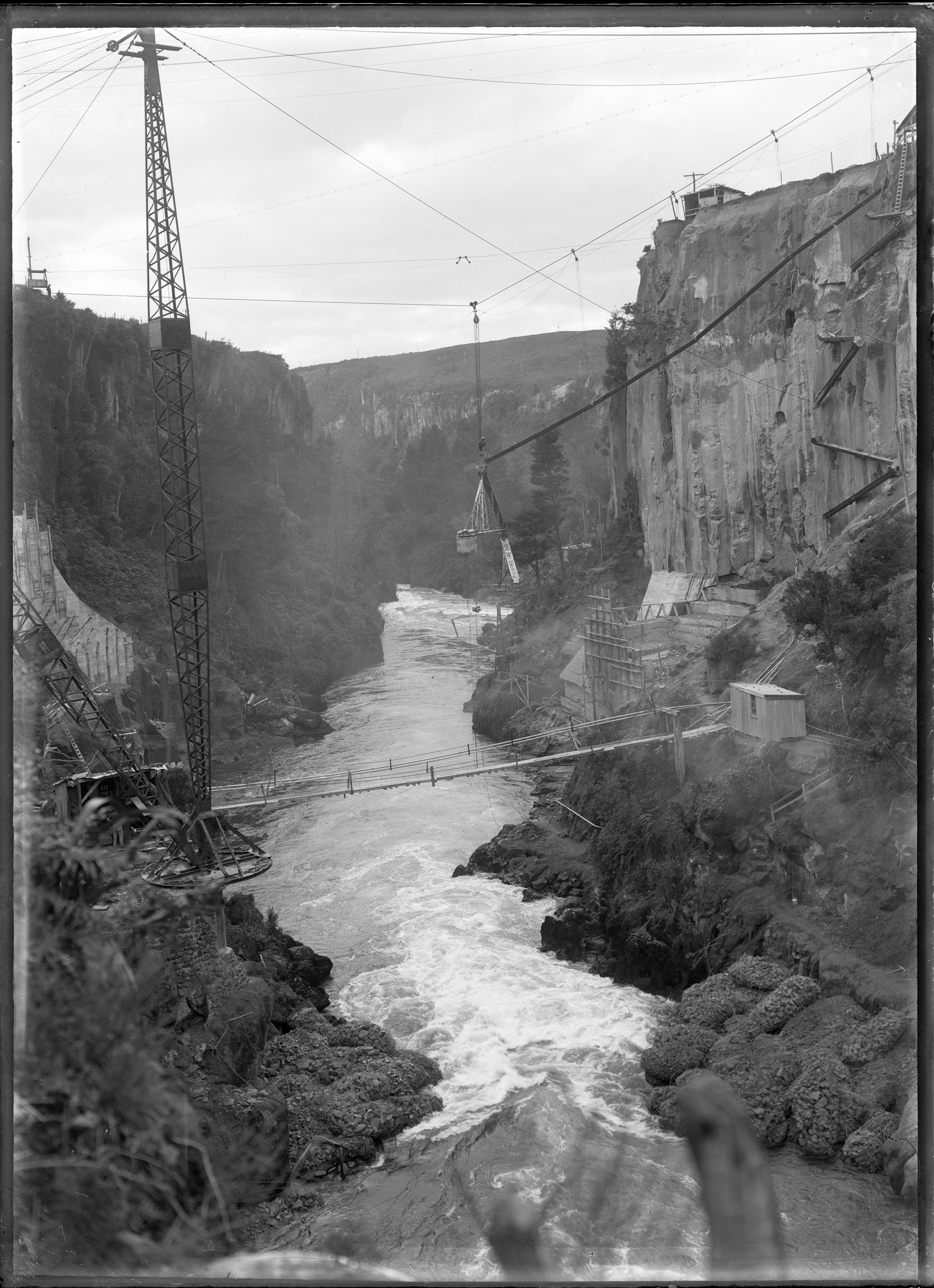
The Arapuni Gorge during the construction of the power station, 1929

The Arapuni Suspension Bridge, just downstream from the power station, was opened in 1926. It gave access from 'top camp' (which eventually became the Arapuni township) on the true right to the power station construction site on the true left of the Waikato River.

Originally, electricity from Arapuni was stepped up to 110,000 volts and transmitted along two transmission lines (one single-circuit and one double-circuit) to Penrose substation in Auckland, with intermediate substations at Hamilton and Bombay. Electricity was also supplied into the Horahora system via a 110,000/50,000 volt interconnecting transformer. In 1934, a 110,000 volt line was commissioned from Arapuni to Stratford in Taranaki, connecting the station to the Mangahao-Waikeremoana system and on to the lower North Island.

In 1934, increasing demand for electricity resulted in Arapuni being extended. The powerhouse was doubled in size, and provisions for four more turbines were made. Turbines 5 and 6 were commissioned four years later in 1938. The last two turbines were commissioned in 1946 to meet the increasing demand for electricity following World War II.

In 1990, a $50 million repair, refurbishment and upgrade project was completed, the first stage of which involved construction of a diversion channel. In 2000 it was determined that the historic seepage problem had worsened, interim repairs were carried out while a more permanent solution was devised and this took the form of a $20 million engineering project, which was carried out in 2005–07. In 2001, work was completed on four of Arapuni's turbines to increase capacity from 24.7 megawatts (33,100 hp) to 26.7 megawatts (35,800 hp) each and to improve their peak efficiency.

== Cultural references ==
The creation of the Arapuni dam and hydroelectric station is described at length in Robin Hyde's novel Nor the Years Condemn (1938). The novel's narrator describes the Waikato River as a living being that views the dam as an "insolence." Referring to the discovery of the water seepage problem identified shortly after the commissioning of the dam, the main character suggests that it was a consequence of disrespect for Māori land:

Ah, she won't ever be any good. She won't work, because she isn't lucky.... We took this country off the Maoris, didn't we? You wait and see if they haven't put some kind of tapu on Arapuni.
