= Hole-in-the-Wall, Herefordshire =

Hamlet in Herefordshire, England

Coordinates: 51.95451°N 2.56891°W

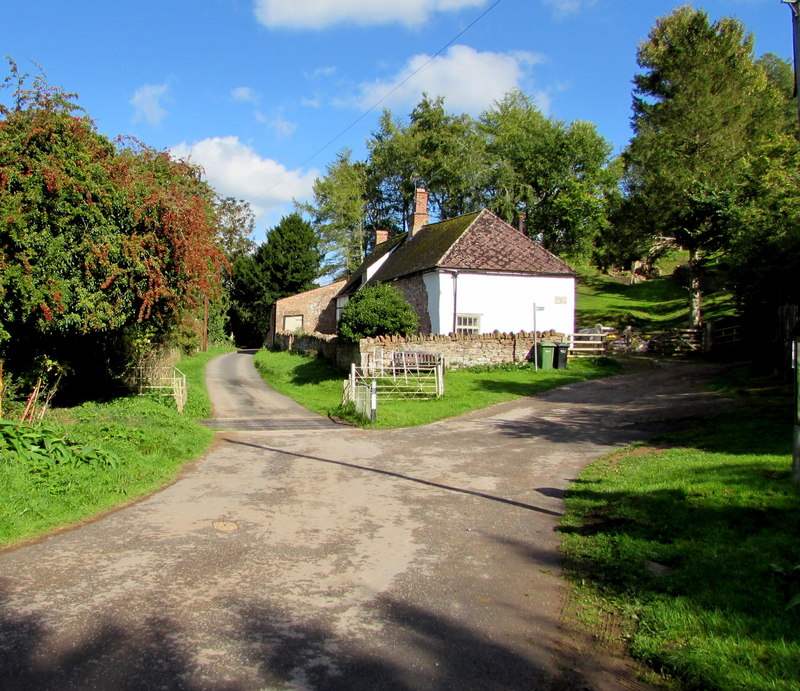
Fork

Hole-in-the-Wall is a riverside settlement on the east bank of the River Wye in the English county of Herefordshire.

It is some five miles to the north of the town of Ross-on-Wye and part of the parish of Foy — the village of Foy, a mile to the west, is accessible by a footbridge over the Wye, built in 1919 by David Rowell & Co. It is featured in the British television series Survivors, in an episode titled "Gone Away" (1975).

Court Farm was a PGL activity holidays centre but has now been sold to private owners.
