= Waikato River Trails =

New Zealand cycling and tramping trail

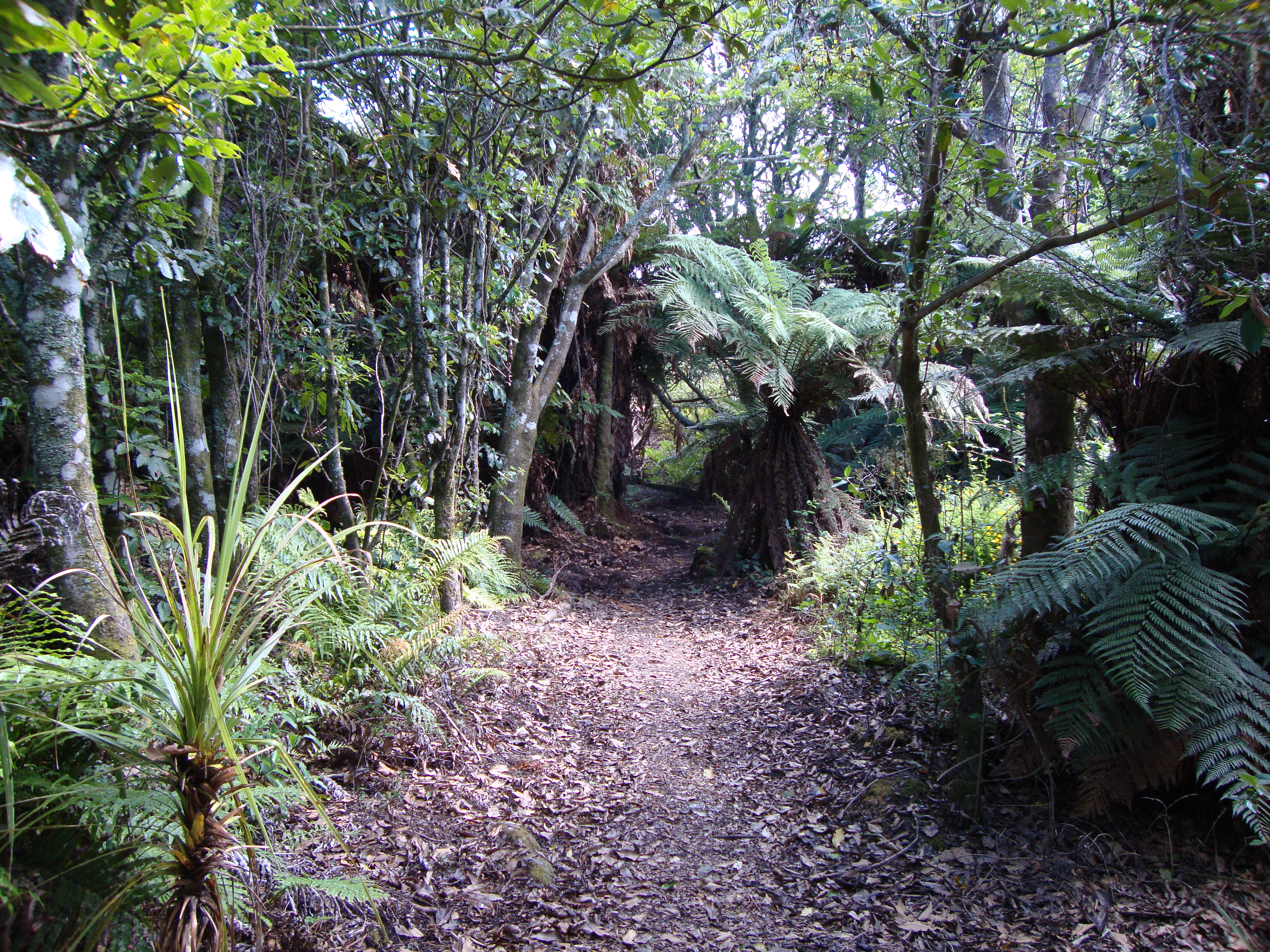
- Snowsill to Ātiamuri Trail in January 2010
- Length: 100 km (62 mi)
- Location: near Ātiamuri, New Zealand
- Trailheads: Ātiamuri / Horahora
- Use: Walking; Cycling
- Difficulty: Average to difficult
- Season: Year round
- Sights: Waikato River; Hydropower lakes and dams Arapuni Suspension Bridge
- Hazards: Cliffs

The Waikato River Trails is a combined walk- and cycleway along the Waikato River. Originally conceived and started by local politicians and trustees, in 2009 the trails became one of the seven Quick Start Projects that form the beginning of the New Zealand Cycle Trail. The trail is proposed to be 100 km long, out of which 50 km existed before the NZCT scheme was created. In mid-2011, work on the last sections of the cycle trail project sections was begun, while the official grand opening occurred early November 2011.

== Location ==
The trails are located in the Waikato Region along the Waikato River. They pass through the districts of South Waikato, Ōtorohanga and Taupō.

At present, seven trails exist. They are: Arapuni Village to Arapuni Dam, Arapuni Dam to Jones Landing, Whakamaru Dam to Whakamaru Reserve, Ongaroto Bluffs Trail, Whakamaru Christian Camp to Snowsill, Dunham Creek Mobility Trail and the Ātiamuri Trail

The Whakamaru Christian Camp to Snowsill trail is approximately 3 km long and takes around half an hour to walk. The Whakamaru Camp is also a great place to camp at.

== History ==
In September 2003, the South Waikato Economic Development Trust established a Waikato River Trail Management Group. The Waikato River Trails Trust managing the trail was incorporated on 3 February 2006.

In 2004, a 3 km trail from Arapuni Dam to Jones Landing was opened, marking the start of the construction project.

On 10 November 2009, Prime Minister John Key officially launched the construction of the first New Zealand Cycle Trail project at the Little Waipa Reserve adjacent to the Waikato River. This site, on Horahora Road, has now gone down in history as the spot where turf was first turned on the first of seven of the Government’s Quick Start projects. The first contract was signed in April 2010, assigning $3.4 million from the cycle trail fund to construct the last 41 km of the 100 km distance. In addition, it is estimated that volunteer and in-kind work was donated to a total of $1.5 million.

The opening was scheduled to be in time for the 2010 World Rowing Championships at Lake Karapiro, near Cambridge, New Zealand from 29 October – 7 November. The trail conservatively attracts about 20,000 people per year, with much of the visitors coming from the Auckland and Waikato regions.

== Trail description ==
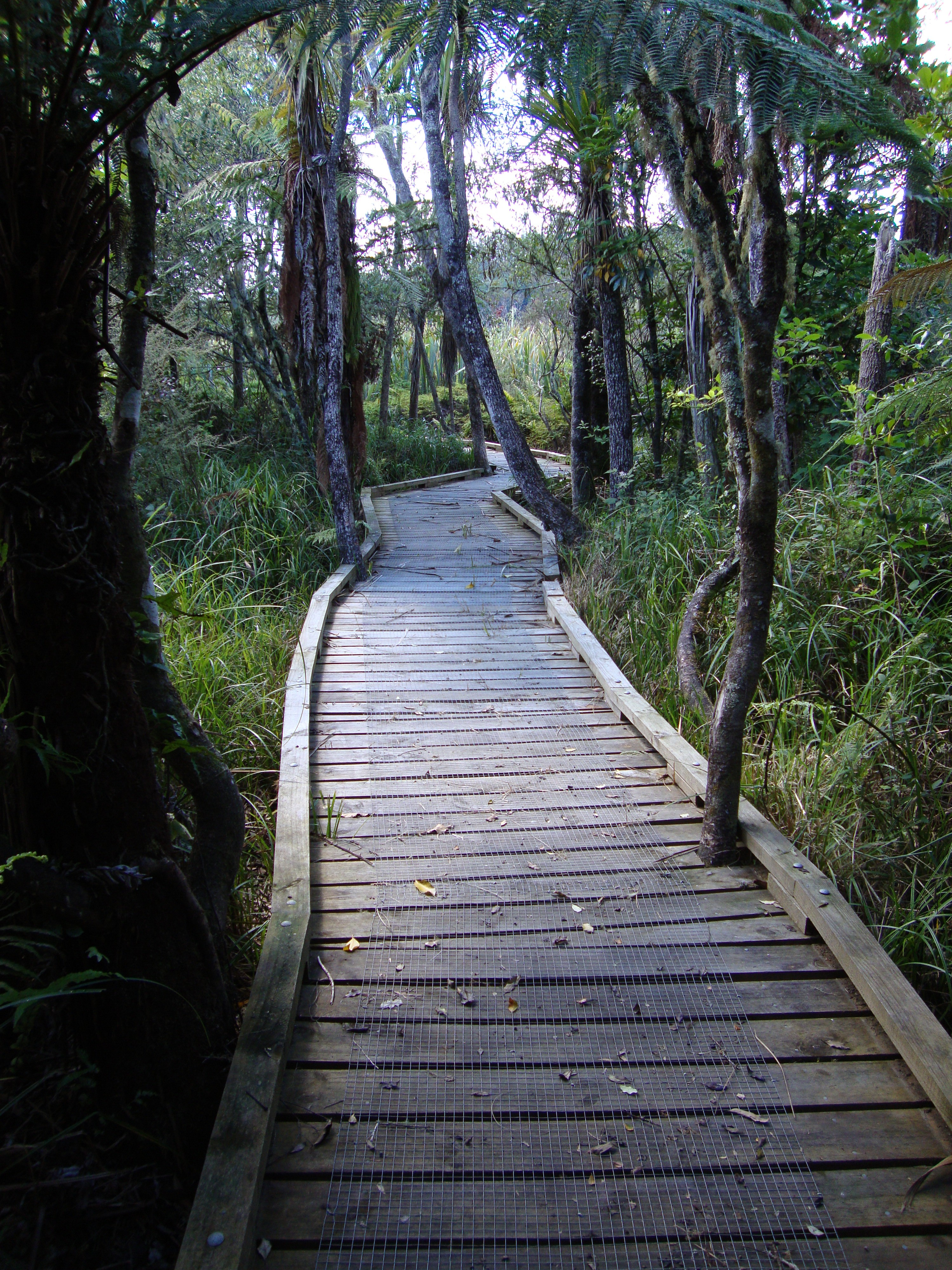
Dunham Creek Mobility Trail as part of the Waikato River Trails

Originally, the trail was envisaged as a walking track only. When users started cycling the sections that had been opened, the scope was widened for the trail to be of dual use for pedestrians and cyclists. For cycling, the target market is family off-road usage with a mountain biking grade of 2–3. One section of the trail at Dunham Creek is suitable for wheelchair access.

As of early 2010, 30 km of trails are already open for use, 23 km are built but yet to be opened, 6 km are under construction and a further 41 km are planned to be constructed during 2010.

As at 2 September 2011 – The section of the WRT between the Mangakino Lakefront Reserve, and the new swing bridge over the Mangakino Stream is nearing completion. From the swing bridge, the trail is completed through to the Whakamaru Reserve and onward to the Whakamaru Dam.

The trust also planted 6,000 native trees as part of riparian restoration along the trail, as well as erecting 18 km of fencing to protect the river from direct impacts of dairy farming.

== Attractions ==
At 425 km, the Waikato River is New Zealand's longest river. The Waikato River has spiritual meaning for various local Māori tribes including the large Tainui, who regard it as a source of their mana or pride.

There are several hydro lakes along this stretch of the Waikato River:

- Lake Ātiamuri was formed behind the Ātiamuri Power Station.
- Lake Whakamaru was formed behind the Whakamaru Power Station.
- Lake Maraetai is a sheltered and scenic lake of 4.4 km^{2} close to the town of Mangakino. At the lakefront reserve in Mangakino you will find the iconic Bus Stop Cafe. There is plenty of parking and free camping for tents and campervans. BBQ, power and toilets available.
- Lake Waipapa is located where the Waipapa River flows into the Waikato River.
- Lake Arapuni is formed by the Arapuni Dam.
- Lake Karapiro was the last of the eight hydroelectric power stations built on the Waikato River, created in 1947.

The Arapuni Suspension Bridge, a popular tourist destination with a span of 152 m, is located just downstream from the Arapuni Power Station.

The Taniwha is a Multi Sport Event utilising the WRT. Distances from 7–88 km for bikers, runners and walkers this great event normally runs in November.

== Corporate sponsorship ==
Mercury Energy, the owner and operator of the hydroelectric generating stations on the Waikato River, is a major sponsor of the Waikato River Trails Trust.
