= Dalysbridge =

Dalysbridge may refer to:

- Mountnugent, a village in County Cavan, Ireland, once known as Dalysbridge
- Daly's Bridge, a footbridge in Cork city, Ireland
