= Droichead Uí Dhálaigh =

Droichead Uí Dhálaigh may refer to:

- Daly's Bridge, a footbridge in Cork, Ireland
- Mountnugent, a village in County Cavan, Ireland
