= Hawke's Bay Trails =

New Zealand cycling and tramping trail

- Length: 200 km
- Location: Hawke's Bay Region, New Zealand
- Use: Walking; Cycling; Horse riding
- Difficulty: Moderate
- Season: Year round
- Sights: Hawkes Bay landscape wineries Beach

The Hawke's Bay Trails are cycling and walking tracks in the Hawke's Bay region of New Zealand's North Island.

== Main trail systems ==
The Hawke's Bay Trails, which are in turn part of Nga Haerenga, the New Zealand Cycle Trail project, are made up of three distinct sections – the Landscapes Ride, the Water Ride and the Wineries Ride – and form a 'Great Ride' of more than 200 kilometres, known as the 'Cycling Capital of New Zealand'.

== Trail history ==
The initial project was started in 2002, started by Napier City Mayor Barbara Arnott with Rotary clubs, Hastings District Council and HB Regional Council have worked together to help create Heretaunga Ararau – "the land of a hundred pathways"
