= Louis Harper =

Scottish civil engineer (1868–1940)

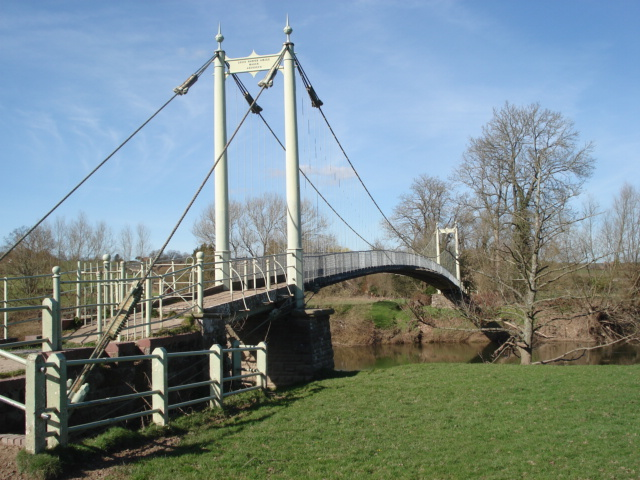
1895 bridge over the River Wye at Sellack Boat, near Ross-on-Wye

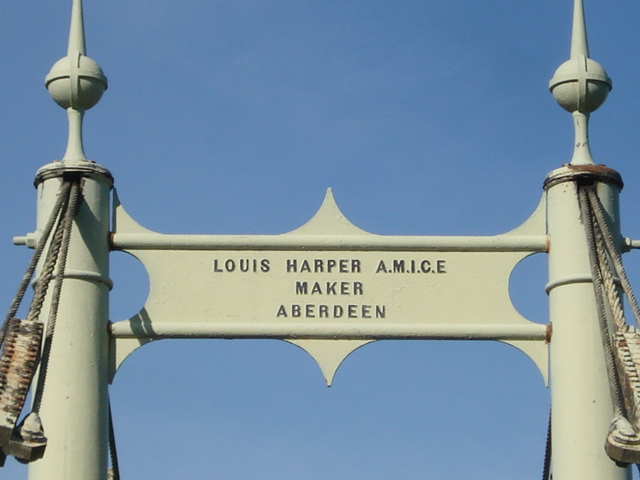
Name plate on Sellack Boat bridge

Louis Harper (23 April 1868 – 26 January 1940) was a civil engineer from the north-east of Scotland who designed a number of suspension footbridges towards the end of the 19th century.

Harper was born in Aberdeen, Aberdeenshire, to John Harper and Margaret Ross. His father came from Turriff in Aberdeenshire, and worked as a fencer in Edinburgh and Glasgow before starting the family firm in Aberdeen in 1856, which became Harpers Ltd in 1885. John Harper patented a mechanism for straining wire, used both to make fences and later also for the cables of bridges. His son John took charge of the business until 1887, while his second son Louis served an apprenticeship with Jenkins & Mar, Civil Engineers.

Louis set up his own firm in 1889, later collaborating with the contractors James Abernethy & Co. In addition to his bridge projects, he assisted Aberdeen Council in surveying their town water scheme. He became an Associate Member of the Institution of Civil Engineers in 1893, resigning in 1921.

The firm's early bridges included suspension bridges at Aboyne, spanning 300 feet (91 m), and at Shocklach in Cheshire, both built in 1871. Neither bridge exists today. The early bridges had wooden towers, although these were replaced in later bridges by structural steel or cast iron members.

He died in Aberdeen in 1940.

== Later bridges ==
- Monymusk, 1879 over the River Don, Aberdeenshire, 107-foot (33 m) span
- Burnhervie, circa 1880, near Kemnay, collapsed 1979
- Birkhall, 1880, Royal Deeside, 60-foot (18 m) span
- Cromdale, 1881 over the River Spey, collapsed and replaced by road bridge in 1922
- Nairn, 1887, first bridge by Louis Harper
- Crathorne Hall, 1888, 55-foot (17 m) span, collapsed 1930 in flood
- Bandon, County Cork, 1890, 120-foot (37 m) span
- Larbert, 1893 over the River Carron, 90-foot (27 m) span
- Feugh, 1893 near Banchory
- Trentham, Staffordshire, 1893, 70-foot (21 m) span, replaced in 1930s
- Grimsby, 1894, three bridges
- Sellack Boat, 1895, near Ross-on-Wye
- Doveridge, 1898, replaced by a bridge by David Rowell & Co.
- Keswick, Cumbria, 1898 over River Greta, demolished 1979
- Narva, Estonia, circa 1898, 260-foot (79 m) span
- Newquay, 1900, about 100-foot (30 m) span
- Chundra Bridge, Chovar Gorge, Nepal, June 1903 (No longer in use)
- Sundari Footbridge, Nepal, in current use (2017)

A number of other bridges are proposed as having been designed by Louis Harper at the Harper Bridges website, although in the absence of clear documentary evidence, they are not listed above.
