= Shakkin' Briggie =

Ruined suspension bridge near Aberdeen, Scotland

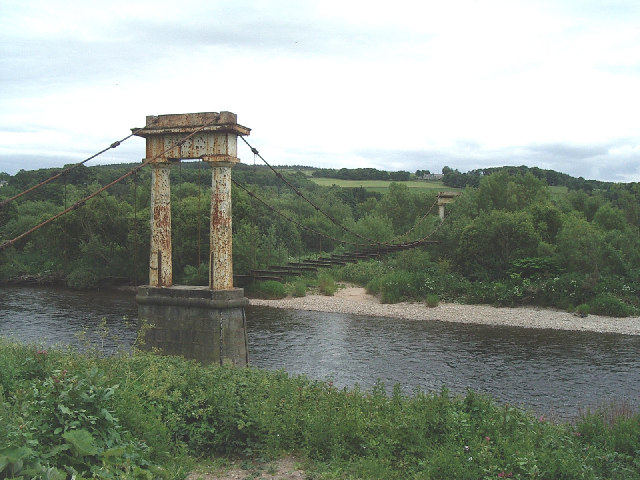
- Looking south-east towards the bridge
- Coordinates: 57.11431°N 2.17055°W
- OS grid reference: NJ 89770 02609
- Crosses: River Dee
- Locale: Aberdeen
- Other names: St Devenick's Bridge; Morison's Bridge
- Preceded by: River Dee Crossing
- Followed by: Bridge of Dee

Characteristics
- Design: Suspension
- Total length: 54.9 metres (180 ft)

History
- Construction start: 27 August 1836
- Construction end: 1837
- Construction cost: £1,400
- Opened: 1837
- Closed: 1984

Listed Building – Category B
- Official name: Morrison's Bridge Over River Dee, Inchgarth Road, Aberdeen
- Designated: 15 April 1971
- Reference no.: LB15733

Location
- Interactive map of Shakkin' Briggie

St Devenick's Bridge (locally known as the Shakkin' Briggie, or as Morison's Bridge) is a disused suspension footbridge which crosses the River Dee from Ardoe to Cults near Aberdeen in Scotland.

== History ==
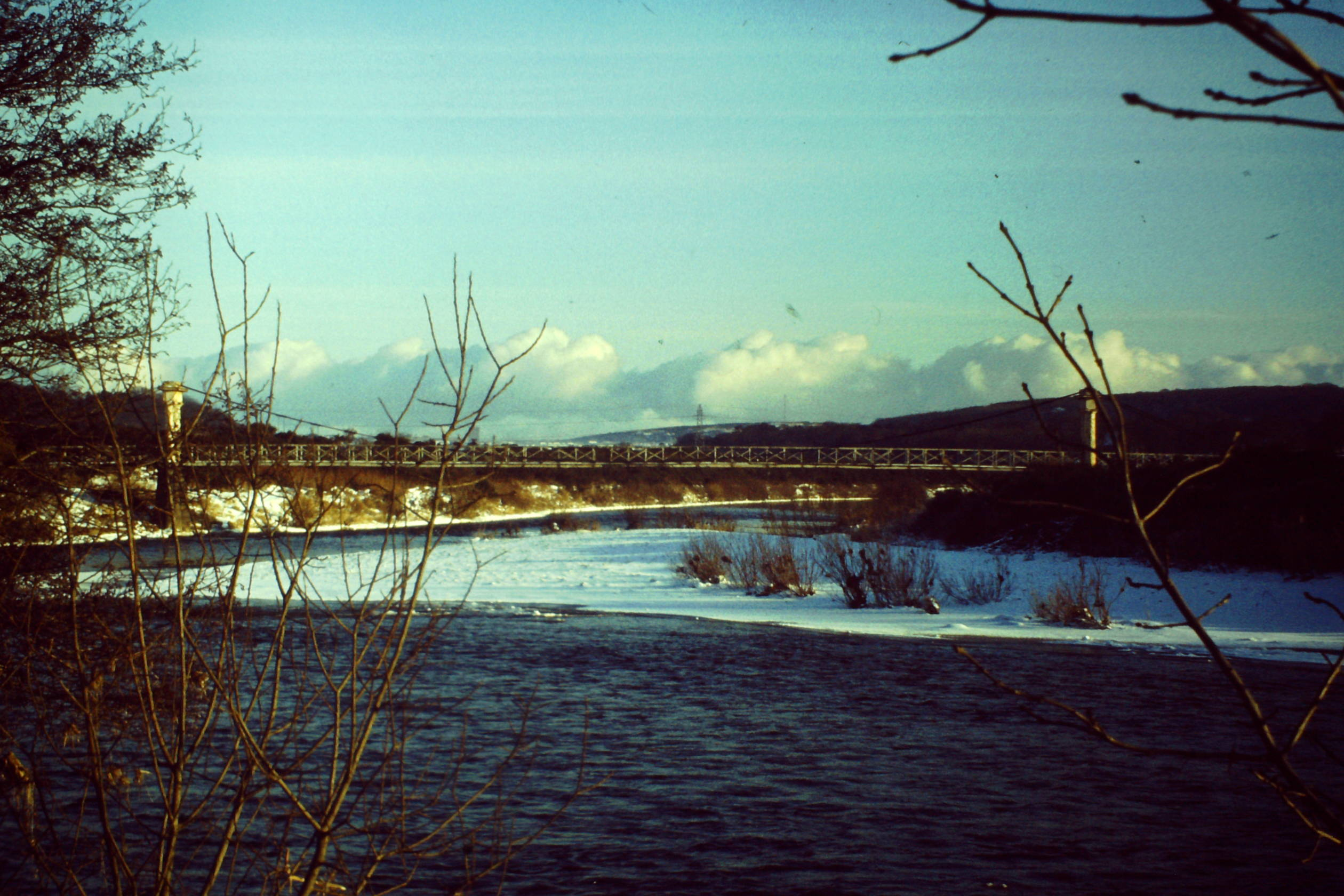
The bridge as it looked in 1979

The foundation stone was placed on 27 August 1836, and the bridge was opened in 1837 (1840 according to Robertson). It was funded by Rev. Dr. George Morison (1758–1845), at a cost of £1,400. Morison, son of Aberdeen Provost Robert Morison, was the minister at Banchory-Devenick Parish Church from 1785, and inherited his elder brother Thomas' estate. He carried out work on behalf of his parishioners including arranging distribution of vaccines, supply of food during the 1800 famine, setting up a savings bank, and building a school.

Morison proposed the bridge to link his church on the south bank of the Dee to 700 parishioners resident on the north bank, who were at the time crossing to the church by boat every Sunday. The bridge was designed by Aberdeen's City Architect John Smith, who had previously worked with Captain Samuel Brown on the Wellington Suspension Bridge in Aberdeen, who helped Thomas Telford design the Bridge of Don, and who designed the nearby Bridge of Dee. St. Devenick's Bridge was Smith's only solo suspension bridge design.

The bridge spans 54.9 metres (180 feet) between stone piers and cast iron towers. The suspension chains comprise 3-inch-diameter (76 mm), 6-foot-long (1.8 m) cast-iron bars, anchored into stone anchor blocks. The southern anchor block is now in the middle of the river, which has changed course considerably since the bridge was built. The timber bridge deck and parapets were built by Morison's friend George Barclay. The lack of any significant metal stiffening of the bridge deck led to a flexibility which gave the bridge its popular name.

The foundations and piers were built by George Donaldson, and the iron parts cast by George Duffus & Co.

After Morison's death, the bridge was maintained by the Kirk Session. At present, it is unclear if any body has legal responsibility for the bridge. A newspaper headline in 1958 stated that it was "the bridge that nobody owns". Although its legal status remains unclear, Aberdeen City Council is currently active in considering the bridge's future.

== Damage ==
The bridge was damaged by floods in 1876, 1914 and most seriously in October 1920, when floodwaters rose above the level of the bridge deck. Public funds were sought and the bridge reopened in September 1922. However, due to erosion, the Dee shifted its course from 1955 onwards, sweeping away the southern approach spans, and in 1984 the decking was removed as a safety precaution. The bridge is a Category B listed structure, and is now derelict.

== Plans for restoration ==
In recent years (as of 2007) plans have been made to restore the bridge and extend it to the south bank. It was proposed to form a trust to take on responsibility for the bridge. However, funding for restoration (estimated at £775,000 in 1990) has not been secured.

In 2022–2023, an area at the Cults end of the bridge was landscaped and improved with interpretation signage and benches, providing views of the bridge and information on its history.

== See also ==
- The Shakey Bridge – Pedestrian bridge in Cork, Ireland
- List of bridges in Scotland
