= Foy, Herefordshire =

Hamlet in Herefordshire, England

Coordinates: 51.953°N 2.587°W

Foy
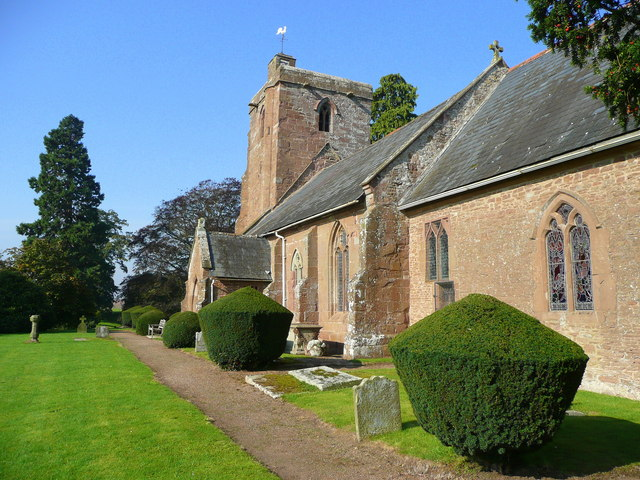
- St Mary's church, Foy

- Location within Herefordshire
- Population: 158
- Unitary authority: Herefordshire
- Ceremonial county: Herefordshire
- Region: West Midlands
- Country: England
- Sovereign state: United Kingdom
- Post town: Ross-on-Wye
- Postcode district: HR9
- Dialling code: 01989
- Police: West Mercia
- Fire: Hereford and Worcester
- Ambulance: West Midlands
- UK Parliament: Hereford and South Herefordshire

Foy is a hamlet and civil parish in Herefordshire, England. By road, it is 7 kilometres (4 miles) north of Ross-on-Wye, 23 kilometres (14 miles) south east of Hereford and 27 kilometres (17 miles) south west of Ledbury. Foy, and the further Foy parish hamlet of Ingestone, lies in a loop of the River Wye with the nearest vehicle bridges at Ross and Hoarwithy.

== History ==
Early archeological finds. In 1791 a hoard of what was then described as "Bronze age celts" was found on rising ground between Hole-in-the-Wall and Old Gore. The word "celts" is obsolete now but probably refers in this instance to axes made of bronze, thereby establishing occupation of Foy in the Bronze Age.

In Anglo-Saxon times, Foy was part of Mercia and records from 866 AD mention the establishment of a monastery at Foy (Lann Timoi).

== Saint Mary's Church ==
The present church is dedicated to Saint Mary. The south porch dates from the early 14th-century and the tower is in the Decorated style.

== The parish ==
The civil parish of Foy includes Hole-in-the-Wall, and Old Gore and had a population in mid-2010 of 158.

=== Hole-in-the-Wall ===
Hole-in-the-Wall on the east bank of the River Wye is accessible by a footbridge, built in 1919 by David Rowell & Co. It featured in the British television series Survivors, in an episode titled "Gone Away" (1975).

== Long-distance footpaths ==
The Herefordshire Trail and Wye Valley Walk long-distance footpaths pass through Hole-in-the-Wall.

== Notable people ==
- Peter Mandelson was introduced to the House of Lords as Baron Mandelson of Foy in the county of Herefordshire and Hartlepool in the county of Durham. He owned a cottage in the village in the mid 1980s.
- Lt. Col. Trevor L. Sharpe, Director of Music in the British Army, is buried in the churchyard. He was a judge on the BBC series The Best of Brass and conducted the theme music for the closing credits of Dad's Army.

== Sources ==
- Ancient Dean and the Wye Valley by Bryan Walters
