= Birkhall =

Royal residence in Aberdeenshire, Scotland

Coordinates: 57.0287°N 3.0740°W

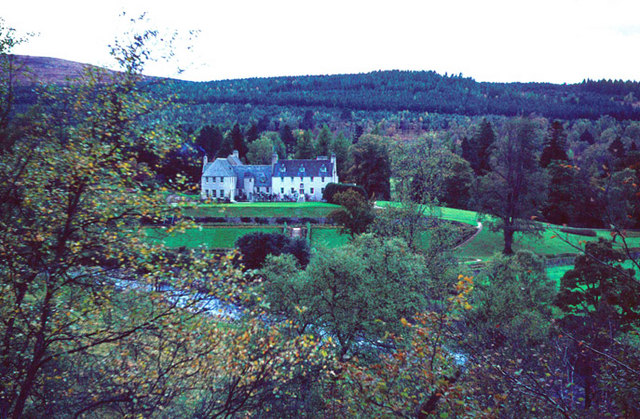
View of Birkhall

Birkhall (from the Scots Birk Hauch: "Birch River-meadow") is a 210 km^{2} (52,000 acres) estate on Royal Deeside, Aberdeenshire, Scotland, owned by King Charles III. It is located alongside the River Muick to the south-west of Ballater.

== History ==
The property was built in 1715. It was acquired from the Gordon family (owners of the Abergeldie Estate) who had acquired it from the Farquharsone family. Birkhall was acquired by Prince Albert, consort to Queen Victoria, as part of the Balmoral Castle estate in 1849 and given to his eldest son, Albert Edward, Prince of Wales. Victoria bought Birkhall back to provide accommodation for her staff and extended family in 1884; Prince Albert Edward had only visited Birkhall once, as he preferred the larger Abergeldie Castle. Birkhall was occupied by General Sir Dighton Probyn, Keeper of the Privy Purse to King Edward VII and Comptroller to Queen Alexandra, in the late 19th century and early 20th century.

King George V lent Birkhall in the 1930s to the Duke and Duchess of York (later King George VI and Queen Elizabeth), who holidayed there with their children, Princess Elizabeth and Princess Margaret. The house was redecorated by the Yorks, who also replanted the gardens. After the Duke of York ascended to the throne in 1936, the new king and queen occupied Balmoral during the summer. Later on Princess Elizabeth, her husband Prince Philip, Duke of Edinburgh, and their children occupied Birkhall during the late summer season. In 1947, Elizabeth and Philip spent a portion of their honeymoon at Birkhall.

Sir David Bowes-Lyon, brother of Queen Elizabeth The Queen Mother, died at Birkhall of a heart attack after suffering from hemiplegia, on 13 September 1961, aged 59. The Queen Mother discovered him dead in bed.

Birkhall was inherited by Charles, then Prince of Wales, from the Queen Mother upon her death in 2002. Charles and his wife Camilla spent their honeymoon at Birkhall in 2005 and have spent every summer there since their marriage. In 2011, Prince William and his wife Catherine, then the Duke and Duchess of Cambridge, celebrated Hogmanay at Birkhall.

In 2016, Birkhall was badly affected by flooding caused by Storm Frank. The garden was reported to have been "devasted". A fine wire suspension bridge crossing the River Muick at Birkhall, erected in 1880 by John Harper, was washed away in the floods.

In March 2020, the then Prince of Wales and Duchess of Cornwall self-isolated at Birkhall after the prince tested positive for COVID-19.

Although King Charles III conducts official engagements at Balmoral Castle during the annual royal summer holidays, unlike previous monarchs, he and Queen Camilla continue to reside in Birkhall.

== See also ==
- Highgrove House, near Tetbury, Gloucestershire, the family residence of King Charles III and Queen Camilla, owned by the Duchy of Cornwall
- Clarence House, in St James's, London, current London residence of the King and Queen
