= Arapuni =

Settlement in Waikato, New Zealand

- Rural settlement
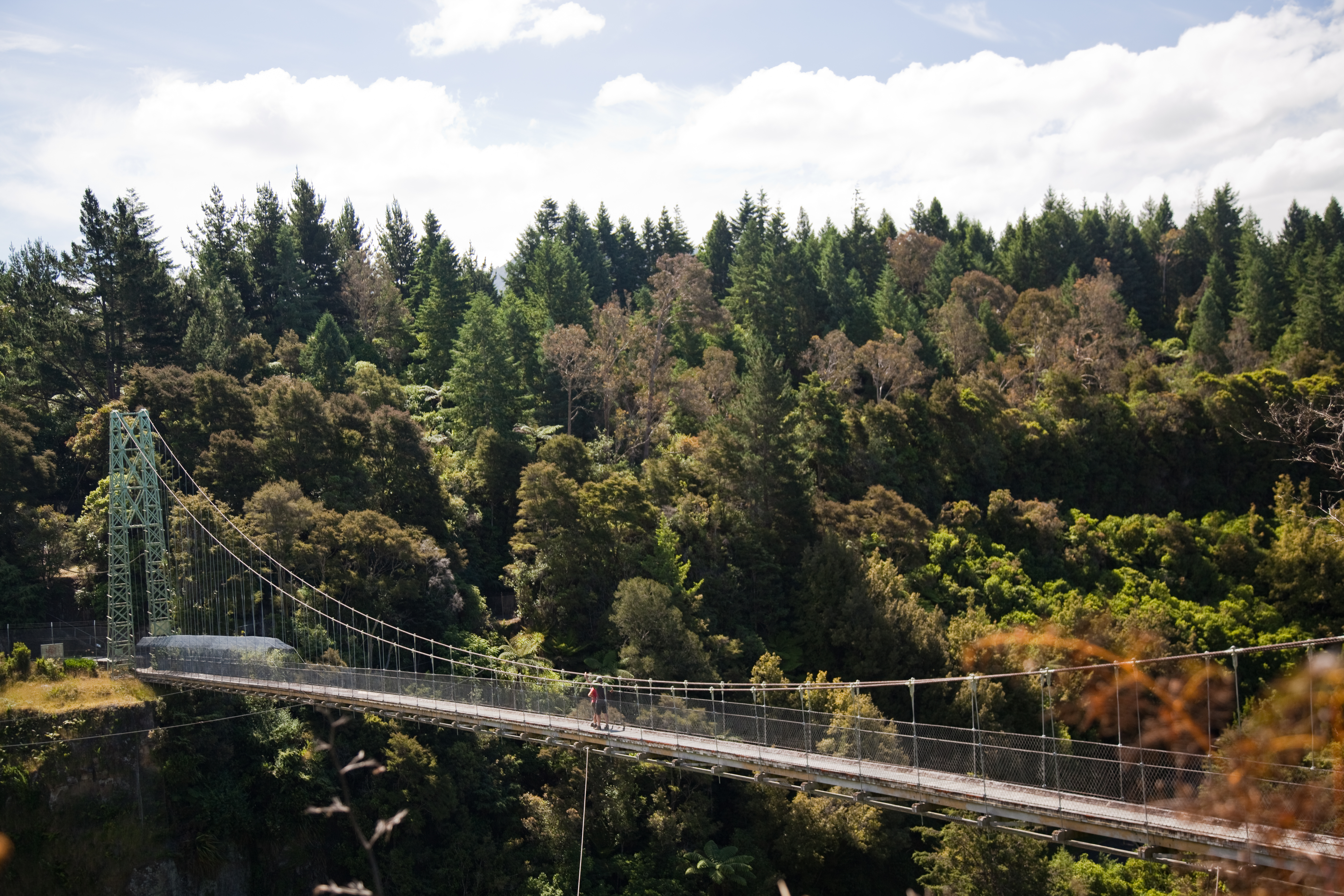
- Arapuni Suspension Bridge
- Interactive map of Arapuni
- Coordinates: 38°04′S 175°39′E
- Country: New Zealand
- Region: Waikato Region
- District: South Waikato District
- Ward: Putāruru Ward
- Electorates: Taupō; Te Tai Hauāuru (Māori)

Government
  - Territorial Authority: South Waikato District Council
  - Regional council: Waikato Regional Council
  - Mayor of South Waikato: Gary Petley
  - Taupō MP: Louise Upston
  - Te Tai Hauāuru MP: Debbie Ngarewa-Packer

Area
  - Total: 1.83 km^{2} (0.71 sq mi)

Population (June 2025)
  - Total: 330
  - Density: 180/km^{2} (470/sq mi)

Arapuni is a rural town centre on the Waikato river in the South Waikato District of New Zealand.

The town sits next to the Arapuni Dam, a hydroelectric dam at Lake Arapuni commissioned in 1929. The Arapuni Power Station consists of eight turbines which give a total output of 196 MW, the largest of the power stations on the Waikato river. The Arapuni hydro station is owned and operated by Mercury Energy.

The name Arapuni derives from Ara, meaning path, and puni, meaning blocked or covered, and translates as blocked or covered path. The New Zealand Ministry for Culture and Heritage gives a translation of "blocked path" for Arapuni.

The Arapuni Suspension Bridge below the dam is freely open to public.

Arapuni post office opened in 1924 and closed from 5 February 1988 when Postmaster-General, Richard Prebble, closed or reduced 580 offices. It was moved to 10 Amber Lane, Puketaha in 2004.

== Marae ==
The local Pōhara Marae is a meeting ground of the Ngāti Raukawa hapū of Ngāti Korokī and Ngāti Mahuta, the Ngāti Korokī Kahukura hapū of Ngāti Hourua, and the Waikato Tainui hapū of Ngāti Korokī and Ngāti Raukawa ki Panehākua.

It features the Rangiātea meeting house.

In October 2020, the Government committed $2,584,751 from the Provincial Growth Fund to upgrade the marae and 5 other Waikato Tainui marae, creating 69 jobs.

== Demographics ==
Statistics New Zealand describes Arapuni as a rural settlement, which covers 1.83 km^{2} (0.71 sq mi). It had an estimated population of 330 as of June 2025, with a population density of 180 people per km^{2}. The settlement is part of the larger Putāruru Rural statistical area.

Historical population
Year	Pop.	±% p.a.
2006	234	—
2013	237	+0.18%
2018	291	+4.19%
2023	324	+2.17%

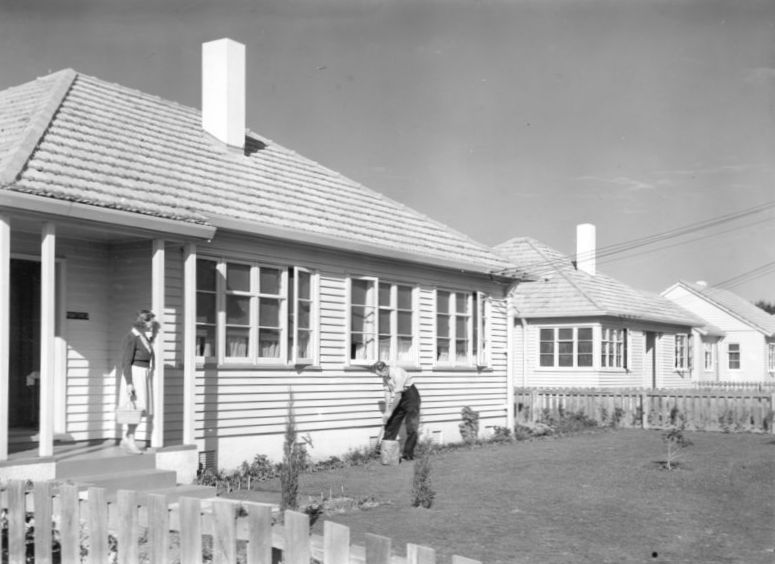
State houses at Arapuni Hydro Works

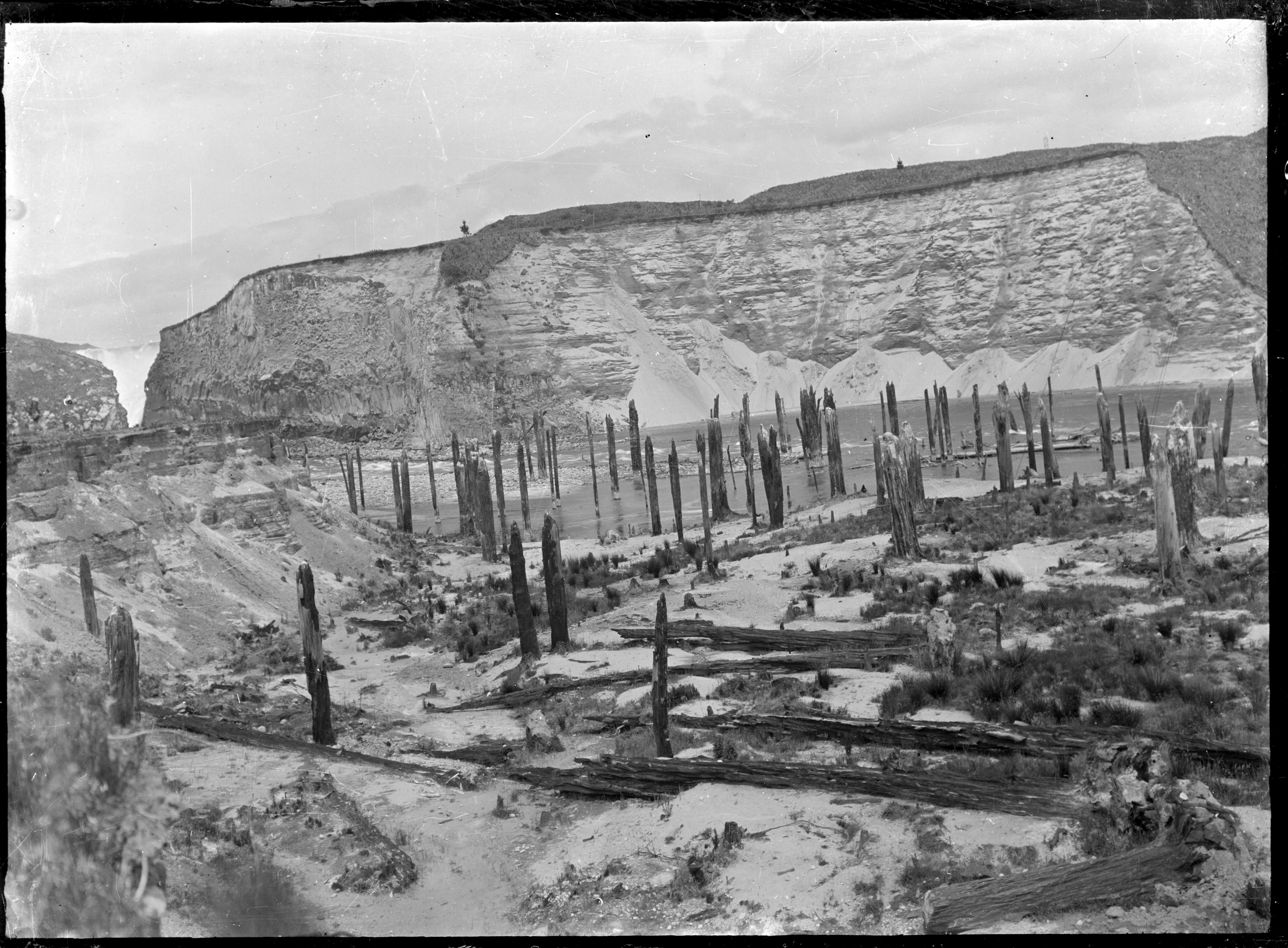
"Drowned forest" revealed after water was diverted, 1929

Arapuni had a population of 324 in the 2023 New Zealand census, an increase of 33 people (11.3%) since the 2018 census, and an increase of 87 people (36.7%) since the 2013 census. There were 150 males and 177 females in 141 dwellings. 0.9% of people identified as LGBTIQ+. The median age was 47.2 years (compared with 38.1 years nationally). There were 63 people (19.4%) aged under 15 years, 39 (12.0%) aged 15 to 29, 159 (49.1%) aged 30 to 64, and 63 (19.4%) aged 65 or older.

People could identify as more than one ethnicity. The results were 88.9% European (Pākehā); 20.4% Māori; 5.6% Pasifika; 1.9% Asian; 1.9% Middle Eastern, Latin American and African New Zealanders (MELAA); and 5.6% other, which includes people giving their ethnicity as "New Zealander". English was spoken by 97.2%, Māori by 4.6%, and other languages by 4.6%. No language could be spoken by 2.8% (e.g. too young to talk). New Zealand Sign Language was known by 0.9%. The percentage of people born overseas was 19.4, compared with 28.8% nationally.

Religious affiliations were 21.3% Christian, 0.9% Hindu, 1.9% Buddhist, 0.9% New Age, 0.9% Jewish, and 1.9% other religions. People who answered that they had no religion were 58.3%, and 15.7% of people did not answer the census question.

Of those at least 15 years old, 45 (17.2%) people had a bachelor's or higher degree, 156 (59.8%) had a post-high school certificate or diploma, and 57 (21.8%) people exclusively held high school qualifications. The median income was $40,800, compared with $41,500 nationally. 18 people (6.9%) earned over $100,000 compared to 12.1% nationally. The employment status of those at least 15 was 138 (52.9%) full-time, 27 (10.3%) part-time, and 6 (2.3%) unemployed.

== Climate ==
Climate data for Arapuni (1981–2010)
Month	Jan	Feb	Mar	Apr	May	Jun	Jul	Aug	Sep	Oct	Nov	Dec	Year
Mean daily maximum °C (°F)	24.7 (76.5)	24.6 (76.3)	22.6 (72.7)	19.5 (67.1)	16.2 (61.2)	13.6 (56.5)	13.0 (55.4)	14.1 (57.4)	16.1 (61.0)	18.1 (64.6)	20.6 (69.1)	23.1 (73.6)	18.8 (66.0)
Daily mean °C (°F)	18.5 (65.3)	18.7 (65.7)	16.8 (62.2)	14.0 (57.2)	11.3 (52.3)	9.1 (48.4)	8.2 (46.8)	9.2 (48.6)	11.2 (52.2)	12.9 (55.2)	15.1 (59.2)	17.3 (63.1)	13.5 (56.4)
Mean daily minimum °C (°F)	12.4 (54.3)	12.8 (55.0)	11.0 (51.8)	8.5 (47.3)	6.3 (43.3)	4.6 (40.3)	3.3 (37.9)	4.3 (39.7)	6.3 (43.3)	7.8 (46.0)	9.6 (49.3)	11.5 (52.7)	8.2 (46.7)
Average rainfall mm (inches)	98.3 (3.87)	74.9 (2.95)	105.9 (4.17)	85.6 (3.37)	98.3 (3.87)	121.6 (4.79)	118.8 (4.68)	163.0 (6.42)	100.9 (3.97)	126.6 (4.98)	106.8 (4.20)	117.7 (4.63)	1,318.4 (51.9)
Source: NIWA
