= David Rowell & Co. =

British civil engineering and construction firm

- Type: Private
- Industry: Construction
- Founded: 1855
- Defunct: 1970
- Fate: Closed
- Headquarters: London, UK

David Rowell & Co. was a company based in Westminster, London that fabricated wrought iron and wire rope, built suspension footbridges, and structural steel frame buildings. They were established in 1855 and closed in 1970.

== History ==
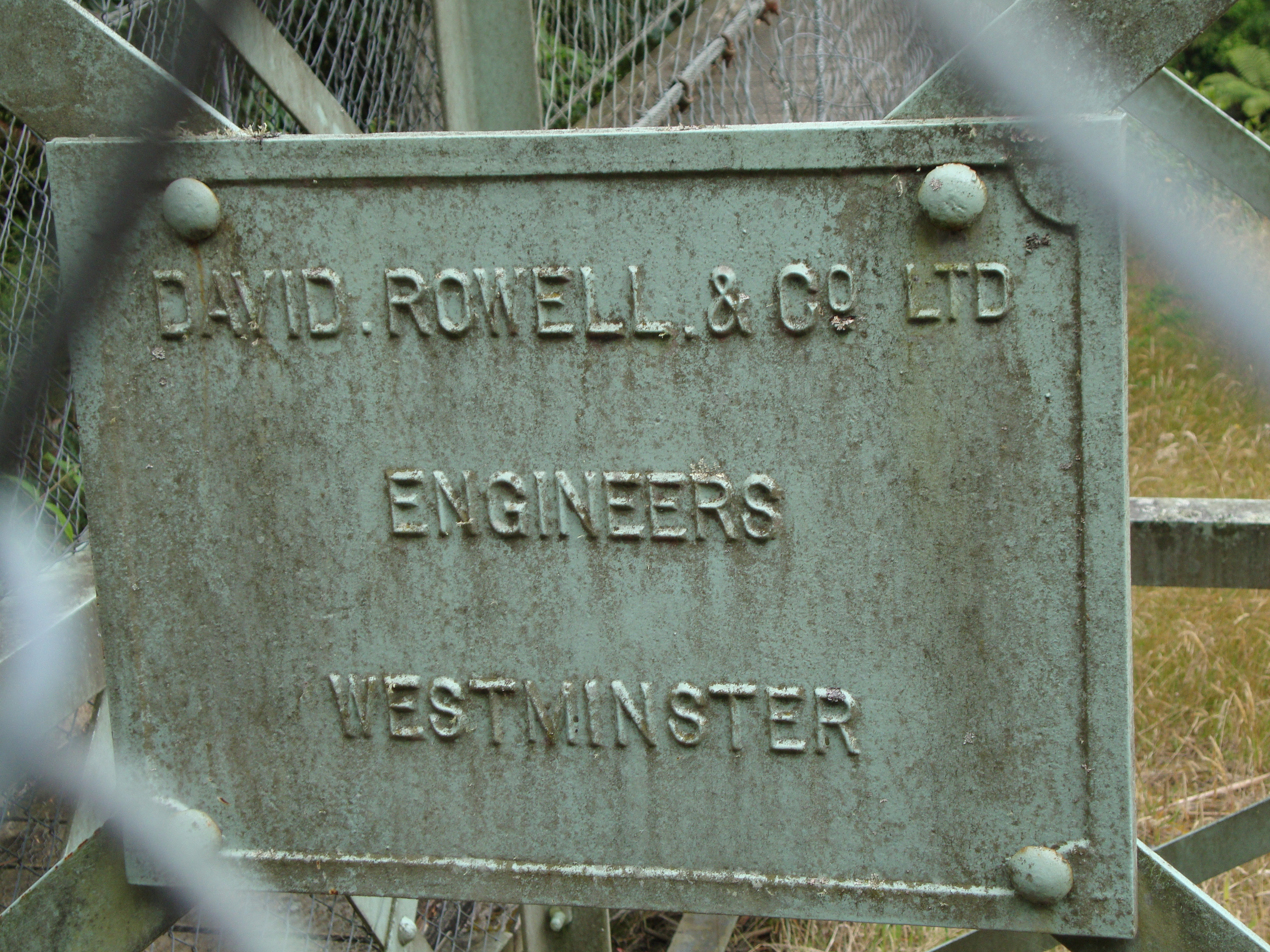
David Rowell Engineerse commemorating plaque

The Company was formed by David Rowell in London in 1855 initially trading as a fencing business but diversifying into structural steel frame buildings. It built various bridges between 1903 and 1951. The Company was liquidated in 1970.

== Wire rope and wrought iron ==
Surviving catalogues from 1885 describe David Rowell & Co. as "The Iron, Wire, Wire-rope and Fencing Company", while a catalogue from 1890 describes their strained wire fences and wrought iron gates. A tram shelter by the firm was built in the 1920s at Guildhall Square in Portsmouth. It was moved to Gunwharf Quays in 2003.

== Bridges ==
=== Pickhill Meadows ===
This bridge was built for Oliver Ormrod of Pickhill Hall, over the River Dee at Bangor-on-Dee in November 1903, at a cost of £640 to serve "cart traffic". It spans 135 feet (41 m) and is 10 feet (3.0 m) wide. It is currently owned by Ormrod Estates. The lower parts of the towers were concreted in the 1970s.

=== Foy ===
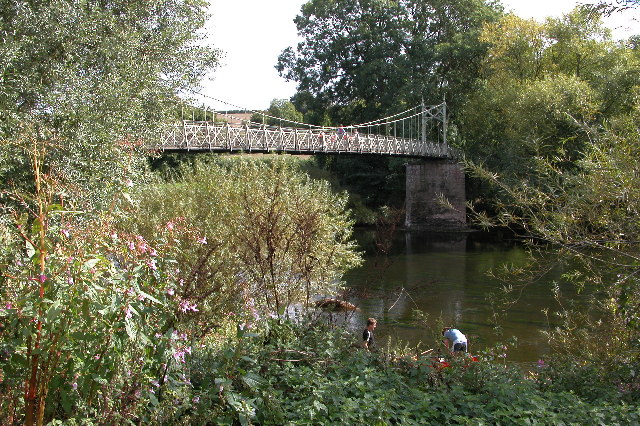
Foy bridge over the river Wye

This footbridge over the River Wye at Foy, near Ross-on-Wye, was built in 1919. It featured in the British television series Survivors, in an episode titled "Gone Away" (1975).

=== Bodie Creek ===
Bodie Creek Bridge was built from 1924 to 1925 in the Falkland Islands, as part of a scheme to centralise sheep shearing at Goose Green. Costing £2,281, it was fabricated in London and shipped to the Islands. It spans 400 feet (120 m) and is 8 feet (2.4 m) wide, and was closed to traffic in 1997.

=== Queen's Park ===
Designed by William E Barker, Queen's Park Bridge was built in Chester in 1923, at a cost of £5,650. It spans 277 feet (84 m), and is supported from two 2.75-inch (70 mm) diameter locked-coil cables, each capable of carrying up to 340 tons. It is founded on the north side on a 230-ton concrete block, and on the south side by anchoring into sandstone bedrock.

=== River Wharfe ===
This bridge over the River Wharfe at Ilkley was built in 1934. The bridge is jointly owned by City of Bradford Metropolitan District Council and Yorkshire Water. Its finials were removed in 1972 when it was discovered that condensation below them was corroding the bridge cables. The bridge was refurbished in April 2001.

=== Other bridges ===
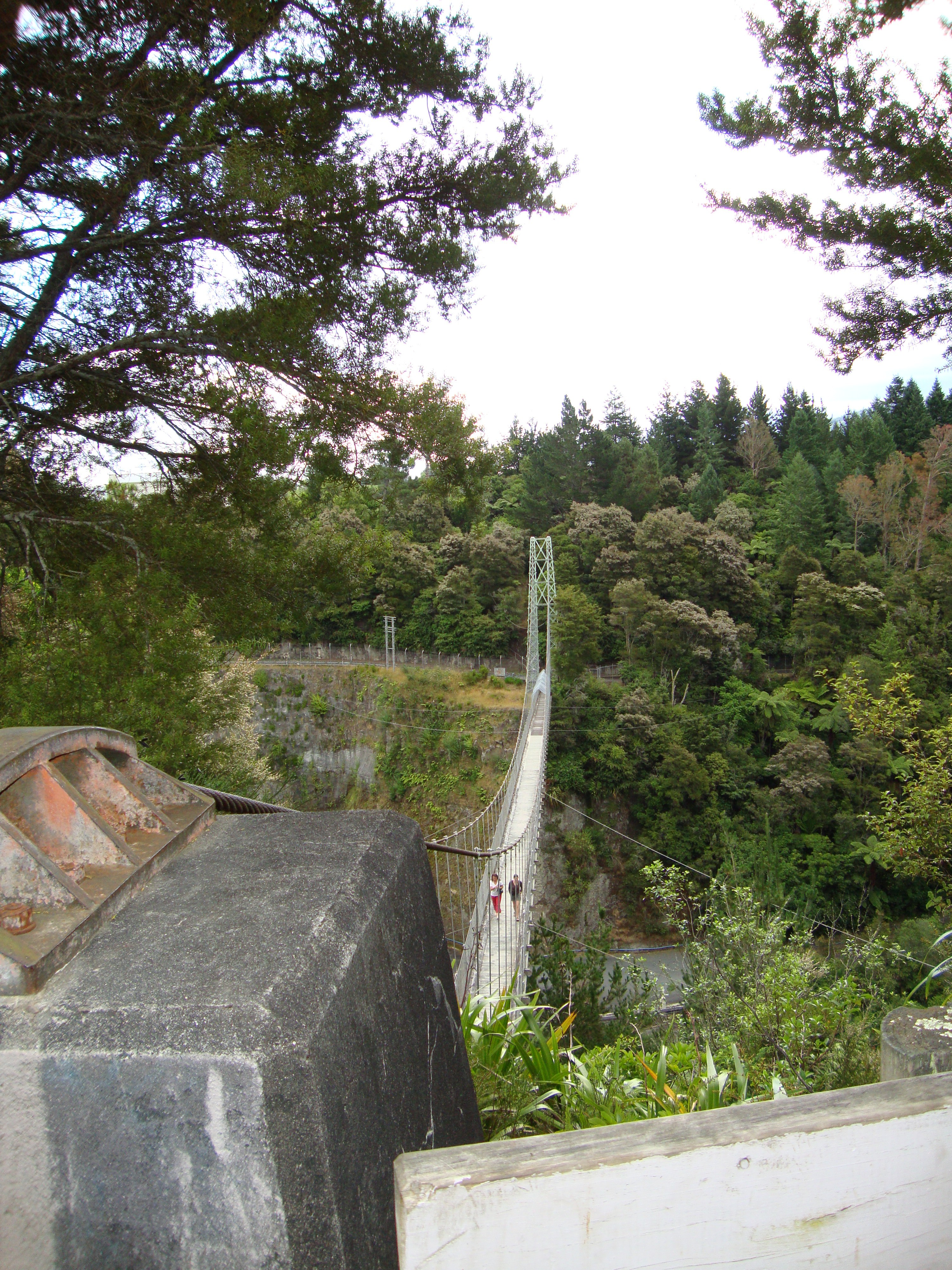
Arapuni Suspension Bridge, with the photo taken from the true right of the Waikato River

Other bridges built by the firm include:

- Sands (Hikey), Swalwell, 1903
- Alum Chine, Bournemouth, 1903-4, renovated 1973, cost £480
- Apley Park, 1905, also called Linley Bridge
- Fron Bridge Llandyssil
- Sparke Evans Park, Bristol
- Castle Footbridge, Shrewsbury, 1910, replaced 1951
- Llanddetty Footbridge, Talybont-on-Usk, 1910. Replaced a ferry-boat. Derelict.
- Howley Bridge, Victoria Park, Warrington, 1912
- Builth Wells, 1922
- Llanstephan, 1922
- Porthill Bridge, Shrewsbury, 1922
- Puente Orellana, El Rancho, El Progreso, Guatemala
- Arapuni Suspension Bridge, Arapuni (New Zealand), 1925
- Daly's bridge, Cork, Ireland, 1927
- Sapper's Bridge, Betws-y-Coed, 1930
- Gaol Ferry, Bristol, 1935
- Thames Ditton Island, 1936
- Doveridge, 1946, replaced an 1898 bridge by Louis Harper
- Festival Footbridge, Aberhafesp, 1951, built to celebrate the Festival of Britain
- Glanammon, Ammanford, 1958

The Black Bridge in Torres Del Paine National Park

- The Black Bridge, Torres del Paine National Park, Chile, unknown build date

== Buildings ==
A catalogue from the firm (possibly dating from 1873) describes their ready-made steel and iron buildings, including a "timber-framed iron church" and "galvanized corrugated iron portable houses for home or abroad".
