= Rangiātea =

Polynesian location in Māori mythology

Rangiātea in New Zealand Māori culture and tradition, is considered to be simultaneously a physical place as well as a metaphysical place.

The physical Rangiātea is somewhere in the Pacific Islands, possibly Ra'iātea Island in the Society Islands (also known as Tahiti), however, it is not totally certain. Other possible locations are in the Cook Islands.

The metaphysical place is considered a font or source of learning and knowledge, especially knowledge handed down by gods, spirit-ancestors, or ancestors.

For example, the mythical god-ancestor Tāne is said to have received the Baskets of Knowledge from the supreme being Io. These baskets were suspended within a building named Rangiātea.

This position as a source of higher learning is reflected in the ancient exhortative proverb:

"Kia puta ai te ihu ki Rangiātea." 'So that your nose may arrive at Rangiātea.'

This expression encourages the individual to pursue study, practice, and mastery of skills to fulfil their potential.

Another well-known proverb referring to Rangiātea is this one, which reminds a person that we are all connected to a common source and thus remain united by a commonality:

"E kore au e ngaro, he kākano i ruia mai i Rangiātea." 'I shall never be lost, I am a seed sown from Rangiātea.'

The metaphorical "seed" represents growth, development, and self-realization. Linking it to Rangiātea provides that this growth and development is founded in the attainment of higher learning, as handed down by ones' antecedents.

Rangiātea is closely related to, and possibly located within, the ancestral homeland of Hawaiki.

Several of the ancestral Māori migration canoes are said to have launched from Rangiātea; namely Aotea and Matawhaorua. Other waka may have also originated from the same location, however, definitive origins are not entirely clear.
