= New Zealand Cycle Trail =

Collection of cycle routes in New Zealand

Logo of the Cycle Trail branding.

The originally proposed start and end points of the cycleway. Commentators noted that the route was unlikely to succeed if following State Highway 1's route and that it should instead be routed through smaller communities, for the benefit of both tourists and the towns on the route.
It was later announced that while the intention remained to eventually connect the whole of the two islands, funding would initially concentrate on particularly promising routes.

The New Zealand Cycle Trail project (Māori: Nga Haerenga, "The Journeys") is a New Zealand government initiative, co-funded together with local councils and charitable trusts, which is to build and operate a network of cycle routes through the country.

As of mid-2011, the first of 18 proposed 'Great Rides' (dedicated cycleways, mostly off-road and in particularly scenic locations) were being finished, while construction was ongoing on most of the others. The first set of 'Touring Routes' (mostly on-road, to connect Great Rides), had also been announced. At the end of 2013, with the initial $50 million (plus local co-funding) essentially all spent or allocated, about 19 routes were expected to be in operation. By 2016, when added funding was announced, the total route length was about 2,500 km (1,600 mi). The addition of Whakarewarewa Forest Loop in 2022 brought the total number of 'Great Rides' to 23, covering 2,755 km (1,712 mi), ranging from the 21 km (13 mi) Roxburgh Gorge Trail to the 315 km (196 mi) Alps 2 Ocean Cycle Trail.

== History ==
Originally called the New Zealand Cycleway, and later the National Cycleway Project, it was initially conceived as a cycling route to run through the length of New Zealand, "from Kaitaia to Bluff". It was proposed by then Prime Minister John Key as the 21st "surprise" item of the national job summit held by the New Zealand Government in early 2009.

John Key, who was also Minister of Tourism, noted that as of the middle of March 2009, officials were working "actively and aggressively" on a plan to implement the cycleway, though the original idea of a direct route was abandoned in favour of linking a network of existing paths and new sections, which Key termed 'Great Rides' in allusion to the New Zealand Great Walks system of famous tramping or hiking tracks. The individual routes are to be connected into a New Zealand-wide network in the long term.

John Key noted that to retain momentum on the process, the first sections to be funded would be publicised by June 2009. This was slightly pushed out until July 2009, when the first seven projects were announced, to receive $9 million in funding. In November 2009, construction started on the Waikato River Trails, the first of the quick-start projects, which received $3 million in funding to construct 41 km of track and thereby finish a 100 km long cycle trail along the Waikato River.

In the second stage of the project, it was announced in February 2010 that out of 54 applications (beyond the quick-start trails), 13 had been selected to receive funding (pending further feasibility studies). If all these trails and the quick-start trails were realised, they would provide over 2,000 km of trail. In September 2010, funding for another five tracks was confirmed, bringing the total up to 18.

On 2 July 2010, Prime Minister John Key opened the first segment completed with cycle trail funding, being the 'Old Coach Road' segment of the Ruapehu to Whanganui Nga Ara Tuhono trail. By November 2010, eight trails were under construction, and the first full "Great Ride", the St James Trail located near Hanmer Springs, opened in November 2010.

In mid-2011, it was announced that Sarah Ulmer would be the official 'ambassador' for the New Zealand Cycle Trail. In May 2011, a customer-focused website was launched for the trails.

In January 2012, the most famous existing cycle route of the country, the Otago Central Rail Trail, became a part of the Cycle Trail umbrella organisation.

In February 2013, it was announced that with most project and funding-allocation work completed after 4 years, the number of permanent NZCT staff would be reduced from 7 to 3.

In mid 2016, another $25 million of funding (plus associated local Council co-funding) was announced by government, with approximately $13m of the funding planned to pay for connecting four Great Rides cycle trails in Central Otago into a connected 536 km track network. The remainder of the funds would be open for local applications.

== Characteristics ==
=== Project scope ===
The cycleway was originally proposed to be a continuous route with a concrete surface, and it was proposed that the Department of Conservation was to supervise the construction process. Cycling advocates noted that having the feasibility study undertaken by the Ministry of Tourism, rather than the Ministry of Transport, boded well for the future of the project.

In the middle of March 2009, comments started to emerge from government indicating that the initial vision of a single track throughout the country would probably not be realised, at least not in the same form. Rather, it was now envisaged that a whole network of tracks would be created, combined from existing part sections, or upgraded from other forms of tracks and roads. The tracks would likely be to different standards in different areas, as some estimates have set the cost for the original proposal of a full track formed in concrete at least $300m rather than the $50m initially suggested.

Setting out further specifics, in May 2009 it was confirmed that instead of a single route throughout New Zealand, the project would, at least initially, concentrate on a number of promising individual links. Substantial parts of these routes could use existing railway corridor reserves or possibly paper roads, or existing cycle infrastructure, where present. They would also have the ability to run through conservation land where appropriate, and take into account existing tourist destinations, thus providing particularly interesting routes.

Prime Minister John Key, in mid-2010, noted that he expected 2,000 km of cycleway to be completed by the end of 2011.

=== Intended benefits ===
The intention of the trail, apart from creating jobs in an economic downturn (both in construction and later in the tourism industry associated with it), is to provide local and international cycle tourists with a route to travel on. Cycle Action Auckland noted in an editorial that the Otago Central Rail Trail had brought substantial benefits to an otherwise struggling rural region, and had been assessed as supporting up to 1,000 full and part-time jobs in the region, and that the tourism benefits of a national cycleway would likely be similar. Cycling Advocates' Network supports the proposal as encouraging cycling in New Zealand, while walking advocates also see benefits to be gained from such a route. Tourism New Zealand noted that the project could also provide a much-needed boost to the viability and funding of many cities' languishing cycling strategies and plans.

Ministry of Tourism figures show that so far (as of 2009), only about 2% of all tourists to New Zealand undertake cycling as part of their activities. The data did however also indicate that cycling tourists stay more than twice as long as the average tourists, and during their time in the country spend about 1.6 times as much as the average tourist. Tourism New Zealand also noted that so far, there was effectively no promotion of New Zealand cycling to overseas tourists, even though it was a significant tourism industry in places like Europe.

Estimates for the quick-start projects estimate that each might occupy approximately 40 people in the initial construction period. Prime Minister John Key noted that he expected about 500 jobs to be provided in construction of the cycleways in total, with up to 4,000 eventually created through tourism benefits the trails would bring. In mid-2011, the newsletter of the New Zealand Cycle Trail reported 511 people employed on trail construction. Job experiences from the Far North District were also positive – among other effects, it was reported that of 110 formerly unemployed young people who worked on the project for half a year as part of a government subsidy scheme, 80 had gone on to other work, rather than returning to the dole.

=== Funding ===
In May 2009, the government announced that $50 million had been allocated for the cycleway in the budget for the coming three years, provided by the Ministry of Tourism. It was hoped that local authorities and other entities would also provide further sums, with co-funded projects receiving priority for money from the budget.

Of the total sum, $2.5m have been set aside for management and advisory functions in the Ministry of Tourism, while $47.5m will be used to create the National Cycleway Project Fund, from which successful applicants will draw money for construction of routes. By September 2010, $45.6m had been allocated to track construction, and had attracted a further $30m in co-funding from local Councils and other organisations.

In July 2010, it was announced that 8 of the 13 cycle trails had received the go-ahead, four needed further study, and one (Tauranga Moana) had been rejected, due to land-use/access issues making the proposal unfeasible in the short term. $18.8 million have been set aside for the approved tracks, with the local authorities adding another $16 million to the project costs. Five more tracks from the list were approved in September 2010.

Among the projects that had applied for funding from the new fund after the scope was changed are routes in urban Auckland, as well as on Waiheke Island and Great Barrier Island. However, none of these were successful, though Nikki Kaye, National MP for Auckland, and other sponsors of the proposals, such as Cycle Action Auckland were optimistic that deserving projects like the Waiheke Cycle Trail would still be realised by other means.

In February 2014, Prime Minister John Key announced $8 million worth of maintenance funding over four years for the New Zealand Cycle Trail Great Rides

In May 2016, another $25m of new-route funding was announced.

In December 2023, the New Zealand Cycle Trail network expanded with the commencement of construction on a new section linking Queenstown to Cromwell, funded through a collaboration among the New Zealand Government, Central Lakes Trust, and Otago Community Trust, reflecting the ongoing investment in the trail system.

== Routes ==
=== Great Rides ===
North Island

- Great Lake Trail 88 km (55 mi) is in 4 sections centred around Kinloch, near the edge of Lake Taupō.
- Hauraki Rail Trail – 160 km (99 mi) from Paeroa to Waihi and Paeroa to Thames
- Hawke’s Bay Trails – 200 km (120 mi) consist of -
  - Wineries Ride loop, accessed from Hastings via the iWay city cycling route, or Clive by the Ngaruroro River trail
  - Puketapu Loop along Tūtaekurī River, from Taradale via Puketapu
  - The Water Ride loop, which follows the coast from Ahuriri to Bay View and
  - Clive—Clifton, which is part of the Landscapes Ride, linking to Cape Kidnappers.
- Motu Trails – 121 km (75 mi) is made up of a dunes trail starting at Ōpōtiki, Motu Road Trail from Mātāwai to Mōtū and the Pākihi Track, via Pākihi Hut. They can be ridden as a 91 km (57 mi) loop.
- Mountains to Sea, Ngā Ara Tūhono 231 km (144 mi), including 32 km (20 mi) by jetboat, or kayak, starts at National Park, or Turoa, on Mount Ruapehu and runs to the sea, including Ohakune Old Coach Road, Mangapurua (Bridge to Nowhere), a boat to Pipiriki, Whanganui River Road, Upokongaro cycle bridge and Whanganui Urban routes.
- Pou Herenga Tai – Twin Coast Cycle Trail – 87 km (54 mi) In the Far North from Opua to the Māngungu Mission west of Horeke
- Remutaka Cycle Trail – 125 km (78 mi) circuit from Petone via Maymorn, the old railway towards Featherston, Ocean Beach and the coast to Ōrongorongo, then Wainuiomata and back to Petone.
- Timber Trail – 85 km (53 mi) through forest, over large suspension bridges and on a former timber tramway, from Pureora to Ongarue. Originally called Central North Island Rail Trail and proposed as a 75 km (47 mi) trail.
- Waikato River Trails – 104 km (65 mi) from Karapiro to Ātiamuri in the south, opened in November 2011
- Whakarewarewa Forest Loop, 33 km (21 mi) through forest, with volcanic and lake views. It can be reached via Te Ara Ahi, which joins Rotorua and Waimangu Volcanic Valley.

South Island

- Alps 2 Ocean Cycle Trail – 315 km (196 mi), Waitaki Valley is the longest Great Ride, running from Aoraki/Mt Cook Village to Oamaru.
- Around the Mountains Cycle Trail – 186 km (116 mi) trail of lakes and mountains via Walter Peak, Von Valley, Mavora Lakes, Mossburn, Lumsden, Athol, Garston and Kingston.
- Clutha Gold Trail – 73 km (45 mi) between Roxburgh and Lawrence.
- Coppermine Trail – 43 km (27 mi) in the hills behind Nelson, via forested valleys, rocky mountains and a riverside trail.
- Lake Dunstan Trail – 41 km (25 mi) along the edge of Lake Dunstan and the Kawarau and Clutha / Mata-au rivers. It links the Otago Central, Roxburgh Gorge and Clutha Gold trails.
- The Old Ghost Road – 85 km (53 mi) via West Coast valleys mountains from Lyell to Seddon.
- Otago Central Rail Trail – 152 km (94 mi) the original Great Ride on the Clyde to Middlemarch section of the Otago Central railway. Created as a cycle trail in 2000, joined the NZCT system in 2012.
- Queen Charlotte Track – 73.5 km (45.7 mi) Created as a walking track, joined the NZCT system in 2013
- Queenstown Trail – 138 km (86 mi) alpine views, wineries and pioneer history, including Arrowtown and Frankton sections.
- Roxburgh Gorge Trail – 21 km (13 mi), in 11 km (6.8 mi) and 10 km (6.2 mi) sections, with a 13 km (8.1 mi) jet boat ride in between. The northern section links to the Clutha Gold Trail.
- St James Cycle Trail – 60 km (37 mi) in St James Conservation Area on a grade 3 loop mountain bike trail built by the Department of Conservation
- Tasman’s Great Taste Trail – 200 km (120 mi) loop via Nelson, Wakefield, Motueka and Kaiteretere, by coast and countryside, with galleries, vineyards and restaurants.
- West Coast Wilderness Trail – 133 km (83 mi) rainforest, rivers, lakes and beaches from Greymouth to Ross.

=== Touring routes ===
In mid-2011, the New Zealand Cycle Trail announced a second type of route, the "touring route". Composed mainly of existing on-road routes (rather than new dedicated cycleways), these routes are to start linking the various Great Rides and New Zealand in general with officially designated cycling routes, chosen for scenic appeal and suitability for cycling (low motor vehicle traffic volumes etc...). The first three such routes announced, all centred on Taumarunui in the central north island, were:

- Taumarunui to New Plymouth (including part of the Forgotten World Highway)
- Taumarunui to Whakahoro (linking to the Ruapehu-Whanganui Trails)
- Taumarunui to Ongarue (linking to the Pureora Timber Trail)

== Public reactions ==
Pre-opening

While many cycling groups and tourism interests such as Tourism New Zealand greeted the project with enthusiasm, there has also been scepticism, mainly related to the potential costs of the project, and the scope for economical benefits. Editorialist Brian Rudman has also claimed that the cycleway idea smacked of Depression Era make-work schemes for the working classes. Others have countered the criticism noting that the money spent on the cycleway would go back into the New Zealand economy in any case, and leave the country with a lasting infrastructural benefit.

Editorialists have remarked that the Prime Minister remained clearly behind the project he helped launch, despite criticism about changes in the estimated costs, and the shift from the initial concept of a single track towards a network.

The project has also created enthusiasm among some business groups, with, for example, a meeting of 130 Waikato business and government representatives endorsing it for the tourism, health and economic benefits it could bring to Hamilton and the Waikato. Also supportive was the New Zealand Contractors' Federation, which considered that it would be very beneficial for many small and medium enterprises during hard economic times.

The cycleway project is also seen as a potential lifeline for small town such as Kumara on the West Coast. The small town, a former gold mining centre, now has only a few hundred inhabitants left, and is facing the closure of its only remaining store. Westland's Mayor Maureen Pugh noted that the Westland Wilderness Trail, which was selected as one of the 13 Phase II trails, could be a "saving grace" by bringing tourism into the area. Similar hopes have been expressed by locals in towns like Kaikohe in Northland. Occasionally, locals, especially farmers, have however expressed concerns that vandalism would occur when tourists on bikes travelled through previously inaccessible areas, though experiences from the Otago Rail Trail indicates that such fears are overstated.

== See also ==
- Cycling in New Zealand
