= Daly's Bridge =

Pedestrian bridge in Cork, Ireland

Daly's Bridge Droichead Uí Dhálaigh
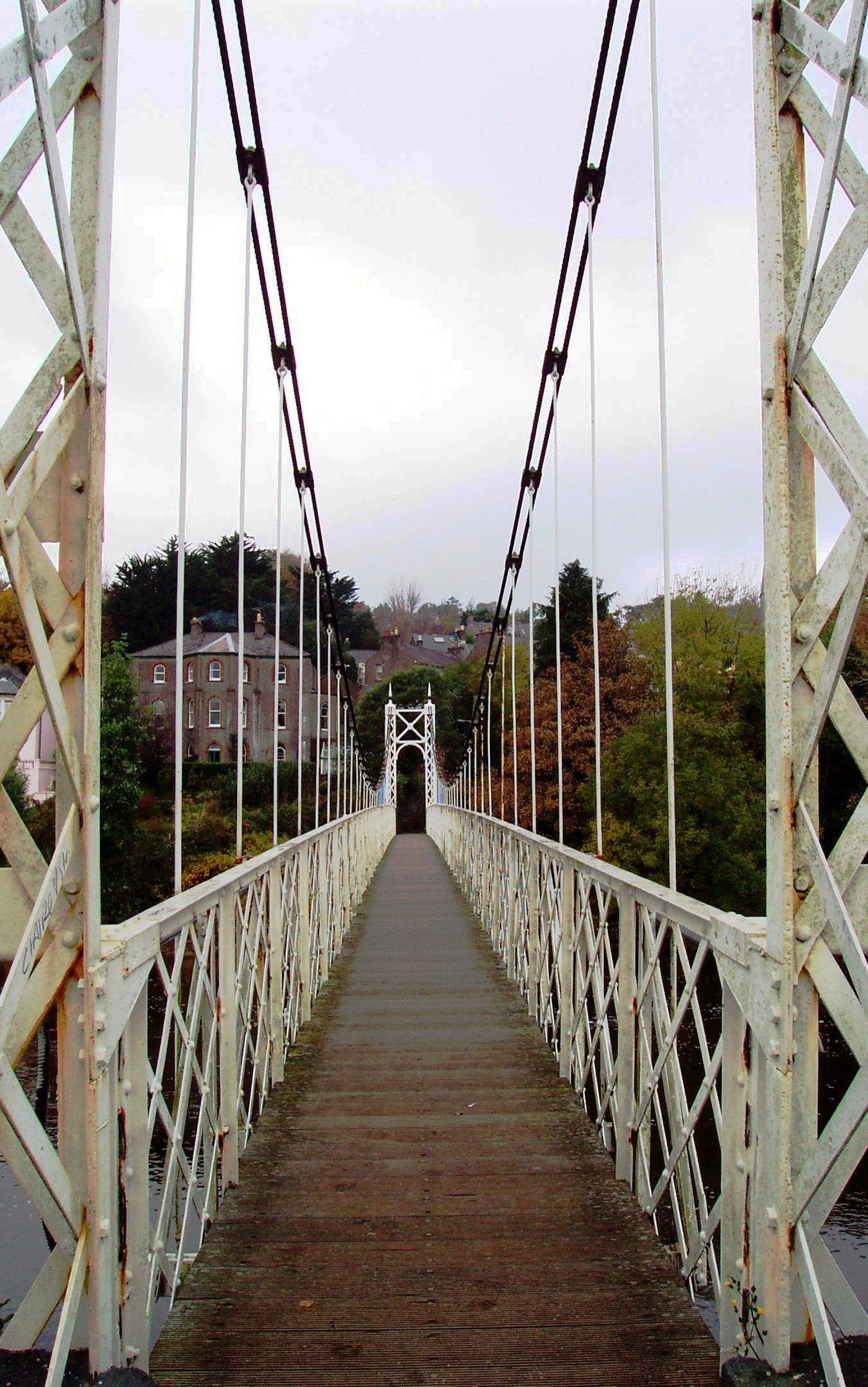
- Looking north across the bridge
- Coordinates: 51.89655°N 8.49922°W
- Carries: Pedestrians
- Crosses: River Lee
- Locale: Cork, Ireland
- Other name: Shakey Bridge
- Named for: James Daly (contributed to project costs)

Characteristics
- Design: Suspension bridge
- Material: Wrought iron
- Total length: 160 feet (49 m)
- Width: 4 1/2 feet (1.4 m)

History
- Constructed by: David Rowell & Co.
- Opened: 1927
- Rebuilt: 2019–2020

Location
- Interactive map of Daly's Bridge

Daly's Bridge is a pedestrian bridge spanning the River Lee in Cork, Ireland. Known locally as the Shakey Bridge, it joins Sunday's Well on the north side to Fitzgerald's Park in the Mardyke area on the south.

Completed in 1926 and opened in 1927, it is the only suspension bridge in Cork City. It was constructed by the London-based David Rowell & Company to the design of Stephen W. Farrington, the Cork City Engineer. Constructed primarily of wrought iron, the bridge spans 160 feet (49 m), and the timber-planked walkway is 4 1/2 feet (1.4 m) wide.

The bridge takes its official name from Cork businessman James Daly, who contributed to the cost of the bridge. Its colloquial name (the "Shakey Bridge" or "Shaky Bridge") derives from the movement of the platform when running or jumping on the bridge.

In August 2019, work began on restoration of the bridge. It was dismantled into four sections and removed so that repair of the bridge structure could be carried out. In July 2020, it was reported that while the structure of the bridge had been reinstalled, "several weeks of work" were required before it would reopen. It was reopened to the public in December 2020.

The bridge is listed on Cork City Council's Record of Protected Structures.

== See also ==
- Shakkin' Briggie (Over the River Dee in Scotland)
