= Lake Arapuni =

Dam on the North Island of New Zealand

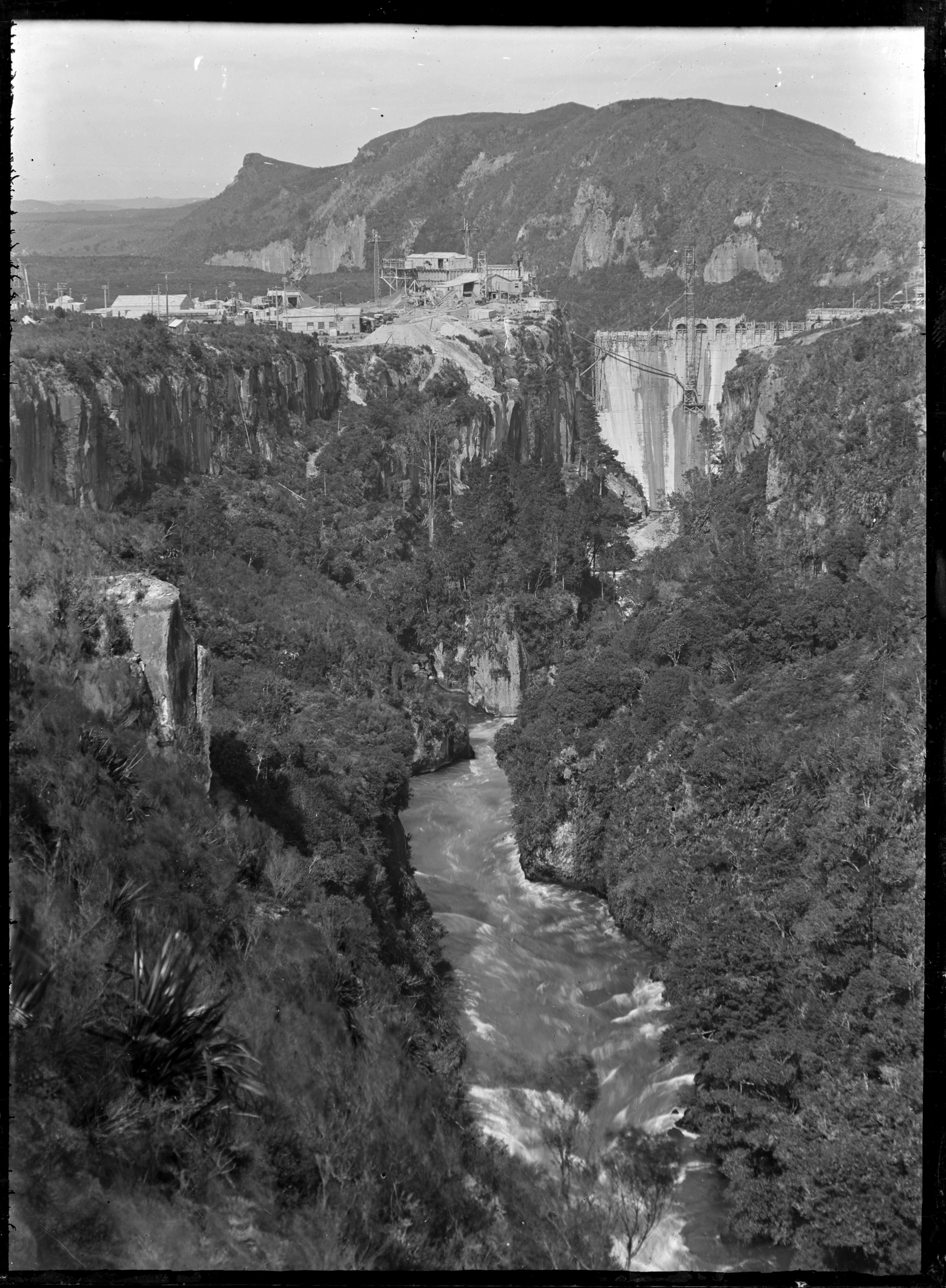
- 1928 photograph of the dam under construction

- Location within New Zealand
- Location: North Island
- Coordinates: 38°8′10″S 175°38′10″E
- Type: hydroelectric reservoir
- Primary inflows: Waikato River
- Primary outflows: Waikato River
- Basin countries: New Zealand
- Surface area: 9 km^{2} (3.5 sq mi)
- Residence time: 1 week
- Settlements: Arapuni

Lake Arapuni is one of several artificial lakes formed as part of a hydroelectricity scheme on the Waikato River in the North Island of New Zealand. It is 65 km (40 mi) southeast of Hamilton, to the north of Mangakino.

The dam, at the small settlement of Arapuni at the lake's northern end, was the first constructed on the Waikato, and was commissioned in 1929. The lake occupies an area of 9.4 km^{2} (3.6 sq mi).

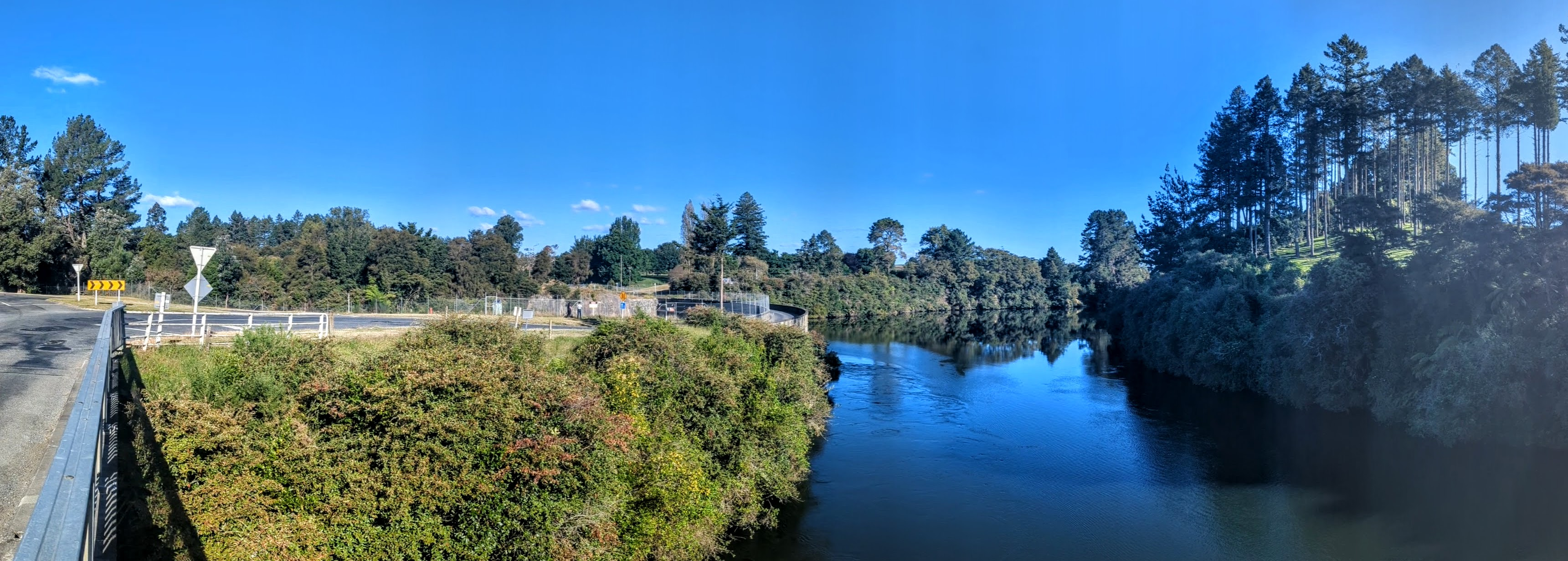
Lake Arapuni and Arapuni Dam on the Waikato River

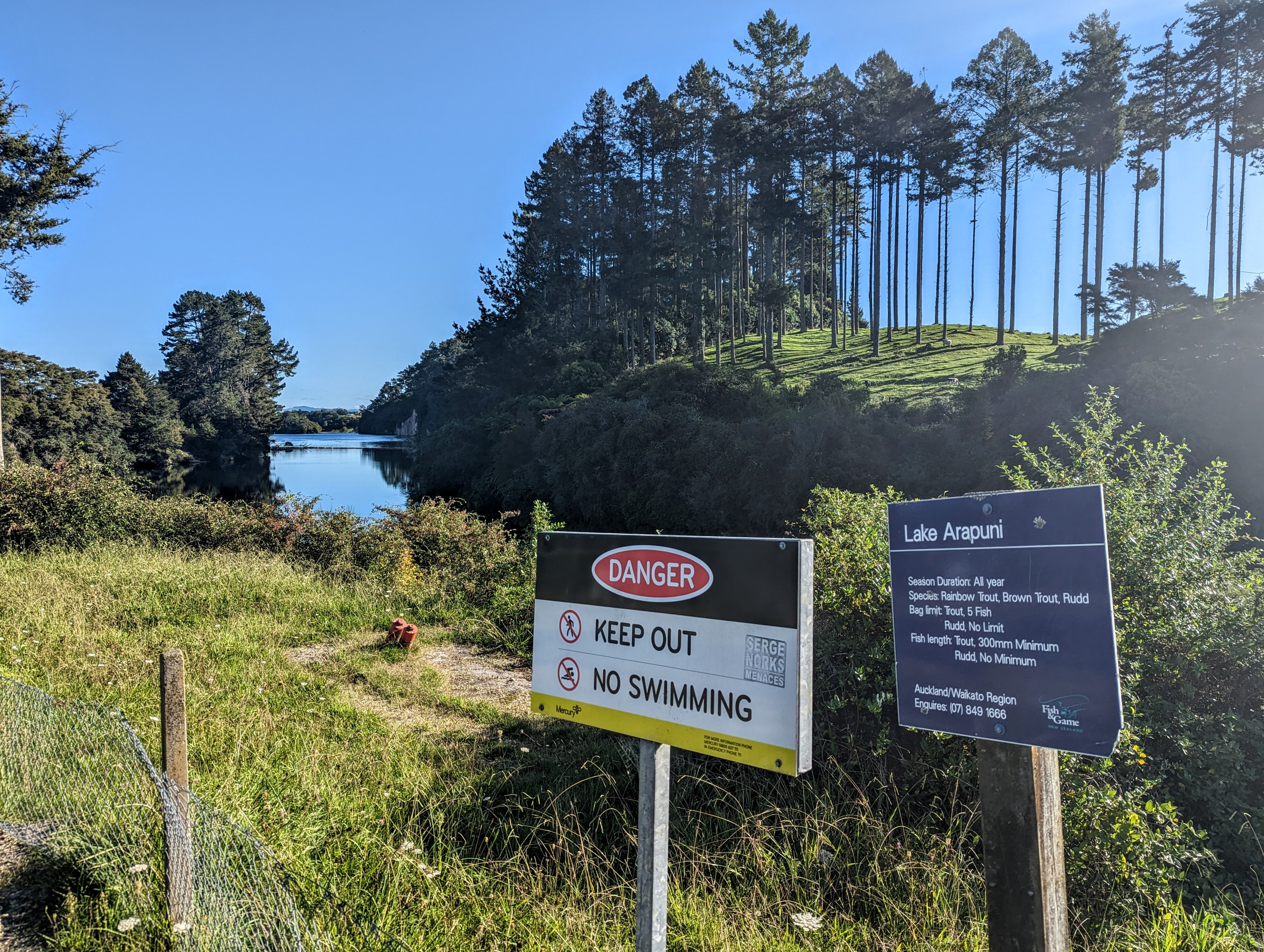
Lake Arapuni signs. Taking rudd is encouraged, while taking trout is limited.
