= Nextbike (New Zealand) =

Bicycle rental scheme in New Zealand

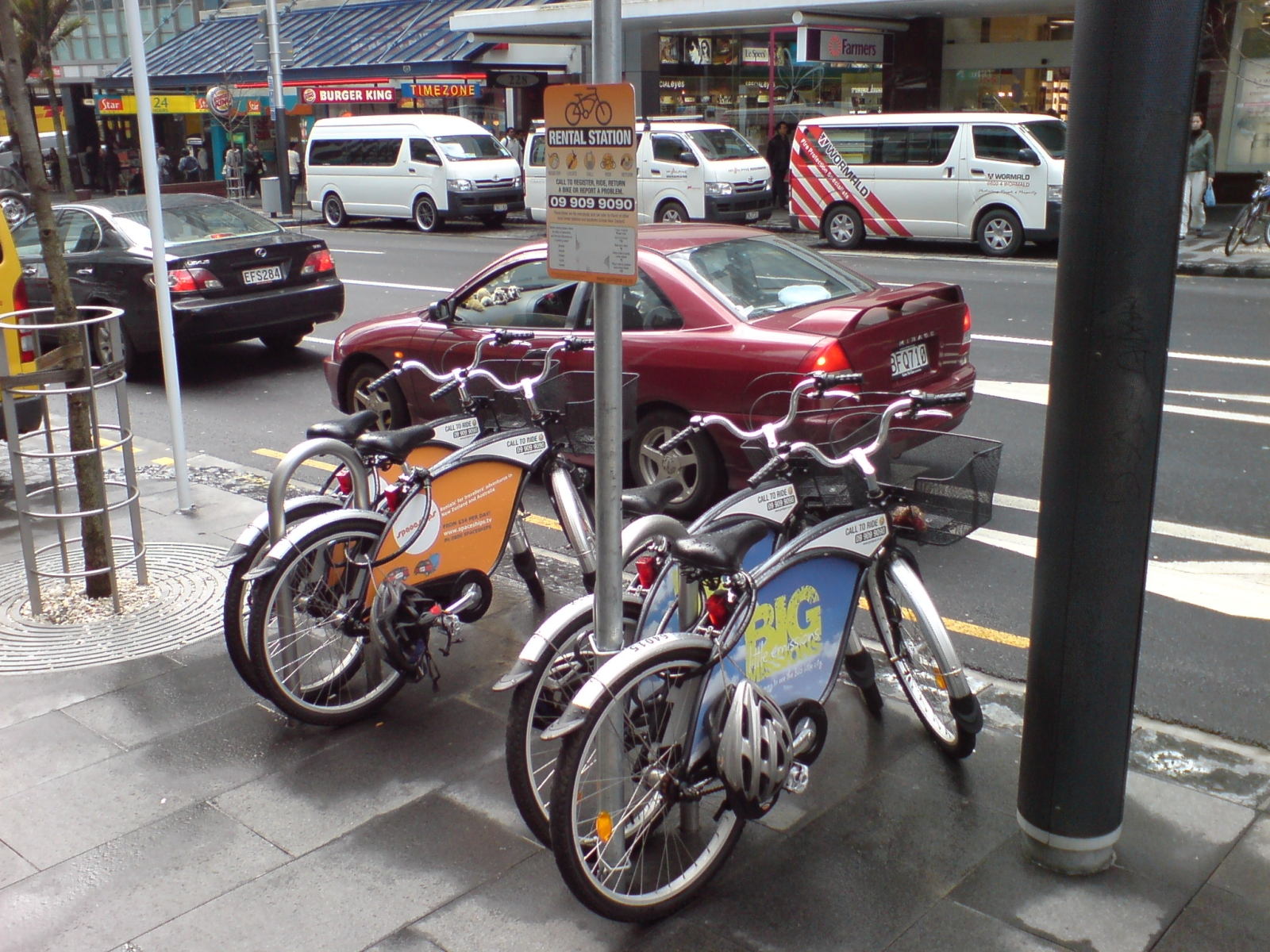
The bikes at a rental station in the Auckland CBD.

Nextbike was a bicycle rental scheme in New Zealand, franchised from the German Nextbike company. It operated in the CBD and central suburbs of Auckland from 2008 to 2010. Due to lack of sufficient advertising revenue, the company ceased operations in that year after failing to win emergency funding from the new Auckland Council. However, it is expected to make a bid for a newly tendered contract by Council to provide a public bike rental scheme, as the bikes of the scheme are still present in storage.

== History ==
As of 2009, the bike fleet had grown from 70 to 170. The company notes that during summer, bikes were being ridden about three hours a day, which was higher than the use rate in some European schemes. To encourage use, registered riders also received 30 minutes free use each day.

Unlike some much larger overseas schemes, the rental system has been implemented privately (financed by a combination of rental fees and advertising on the bikes) though it has recently won official sponsorship from the Auckland Regional Transport Authority. It has also been tipped as a method of travel for visiting tourists at the Rugby World Cup 2011.

Since 2012 there have been a limited amount of bikes available at select locations in Auckland such as Auckland City Hotel and T. White Bikes.

The company was also involved in promoting three potential 'Great Urban Rides' routes in Auckland, aimed at marketing interesting and convenient bicycle tour routes to tourists and locals, in a city which is often considered to be unattractive to cycling.

== See also ==
- Cycling in Auckland
- Cycling in New Zealand
