= Cycling in Auckland =

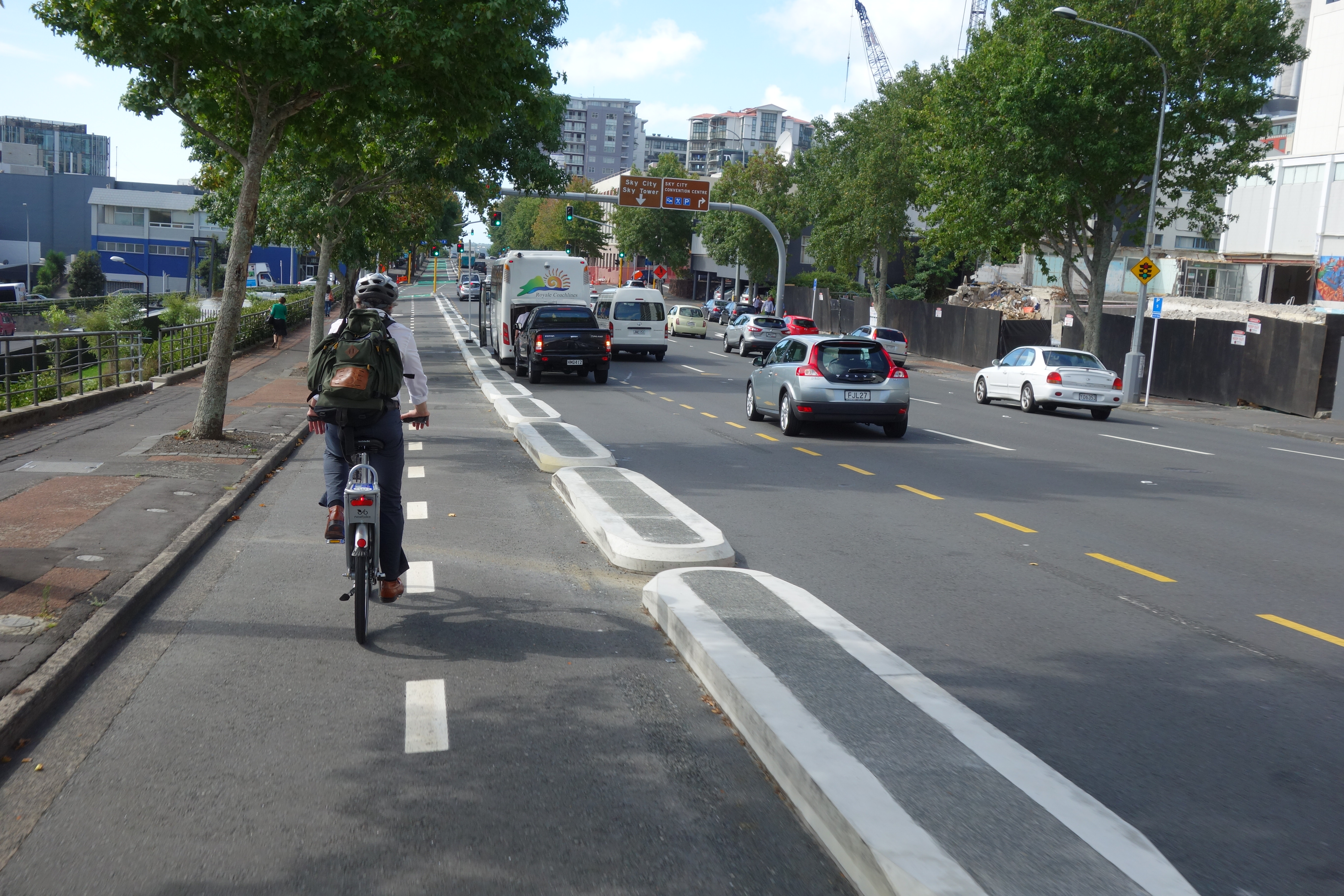
Modern cycling in Auckland is represented by new separated bikeway infrastructure largely added in the 2010s such as the Lightpath / Nelson Street cycleway into the City Centre, which are credited with being part of the reason cycling counters have experienced large annual growth over the last years.

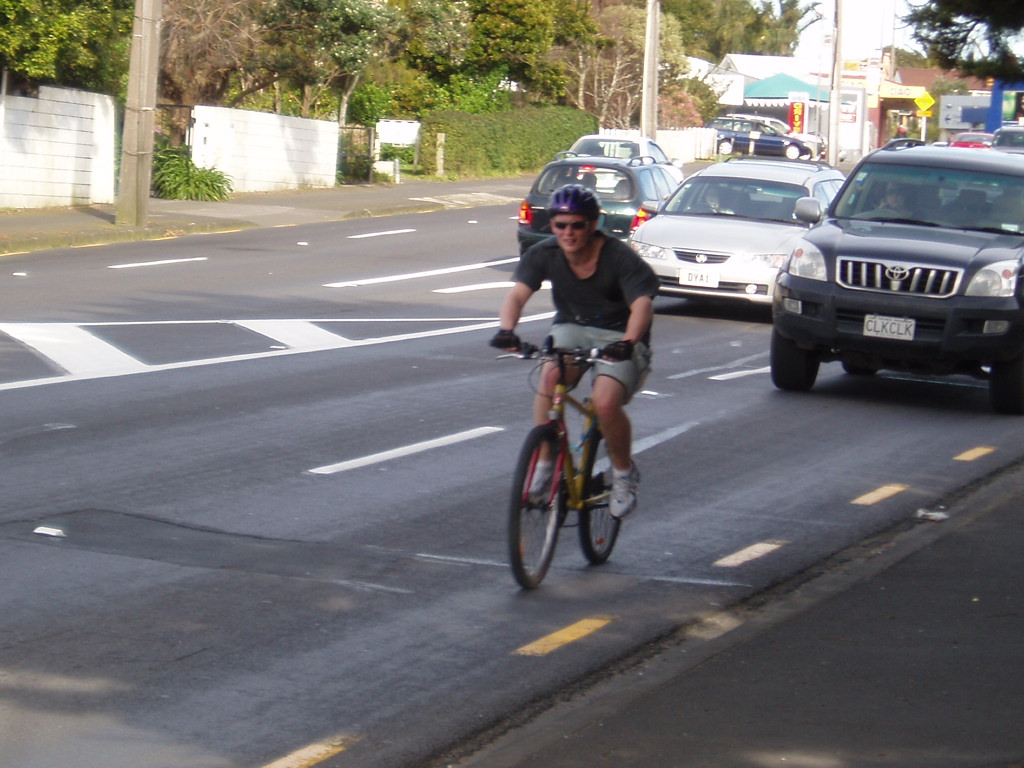
Cycling in Auckland – some areas like the very busy Lake Road on the North Shore only received cycle lanes after significant local opposition, and the Council considered removing the lanes after installation.

Cycling in Auckland is a mode of transport in Auckland, New Zealand. The dominance of the car in the city, the negative attitudes of car drivers and general changes in transport patterns have made it a very marginal transport mode in the early 21st century, with remaining cyclists often riding for leisure and sports purposes.

While political and infrastructure initiatives are underway to revive cycling, success is still to be solidified. As of 2005/06, only 16% of the Regional Cycle Network had been completed, which also included routes that had been built before the plan for a regional network had been adopted. In 2014, results showed that cycling mode share had stopped declining compared to previous census results, though from 0.9% in 2006, it had only risen to 1.2% of all work trips on census day. However, statistics and automatic counters show the success of cycling where higher-quality infrastructure has been installed, with nine counters across Auckland reporting annual cycle number increases of an average of 10% in 2014, a growth trend that continued in subsequent years.

== History ==
The first Auckland bicycle ride was undertaken on 23 August 1869, using a velocipede made to order by a local company, and ridden down Grey Street, then being one of the smoothest roads in the city.

== Attitudes ==
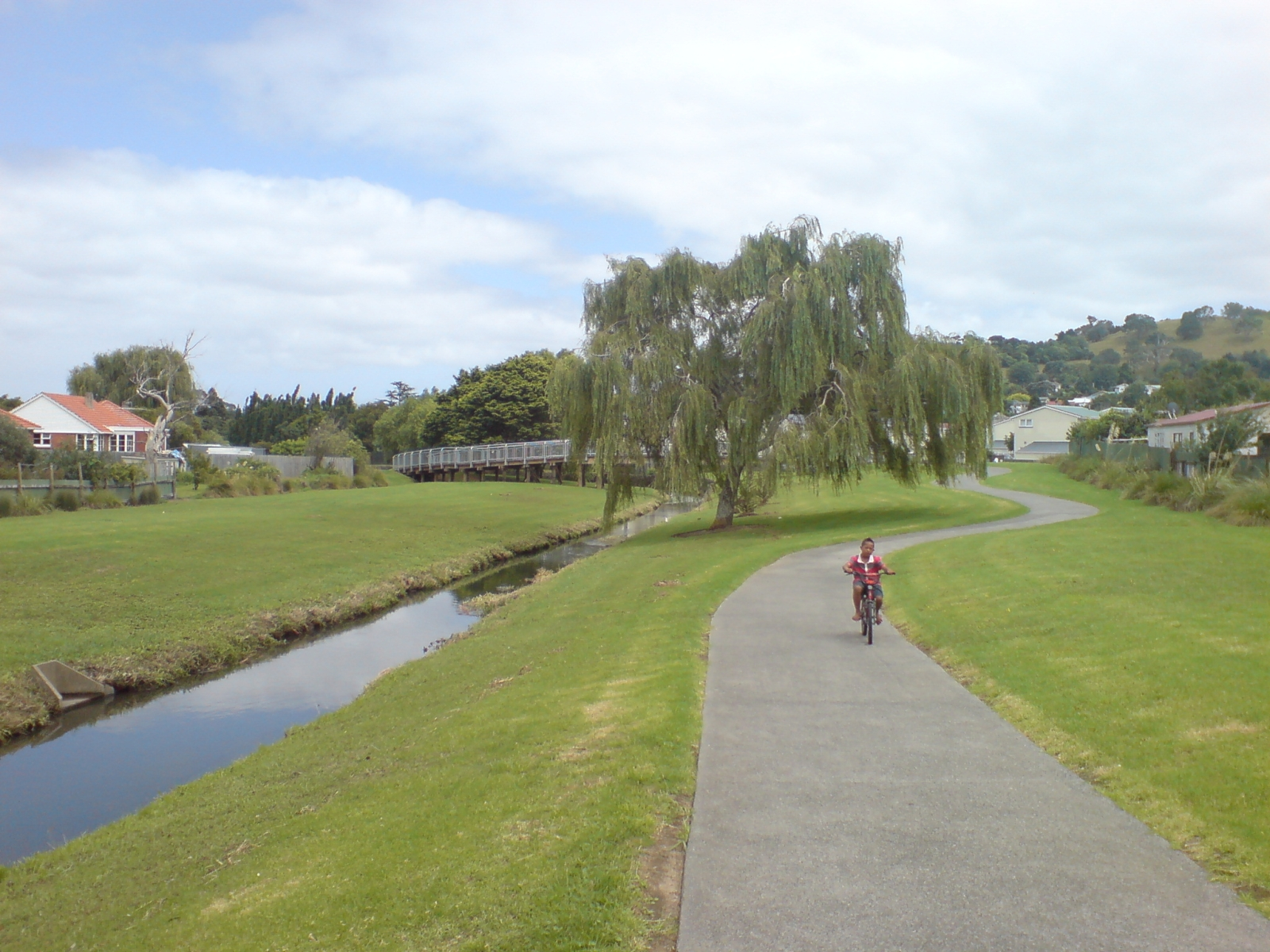
With many Aucklanders unwilling to ride on-road in hostile conditions, and with protected cycle lanes generally scarce to non-existent, another focus of cycleway construction in Auckland in recent years has been on shared paths and "Greenways" routes, away from streets.

Auckland has a much less positive popular attitude towards cycling and new cycling infrastructure than some other cities of New Zealand like Wellington and Christchurch. An Otago University study showed that fear of rude and actively hostile behaviour from drivers was the main reason New Zealanders were not using their cycles more. Some 59% of all respondents in an Auckland Transport study of a cross-section of Aucklanders noted safety as a barrier to cycling.

This, and to some degree the hillier nature of Auckland, have caused cycling to so far remain a marginal pursuit – only 1% of all morning peak trips were being made by bicycle in the late 2000s. However, in Wellington, with an even hillier topography, the cycling numbers are approximately twice as high.

While Auckland City Council and the Auckland Regional Transport Authority (ARTA) have undertaken some works since the introduction in 1998 of a "Walking and Cycling Plan" for the city, cycling connections between different areas of the wider city are still often missing. Some cycle lanes have met vocal opposition, mostly from locals who consider them unneeded due to the low level of cycling in Auckland and due to the removal of on-street parking for their implementation. However, Council representatives note that cycling will not gain in popularity until the corresponding infrastructure is gradually introduced.

== Facilities ==
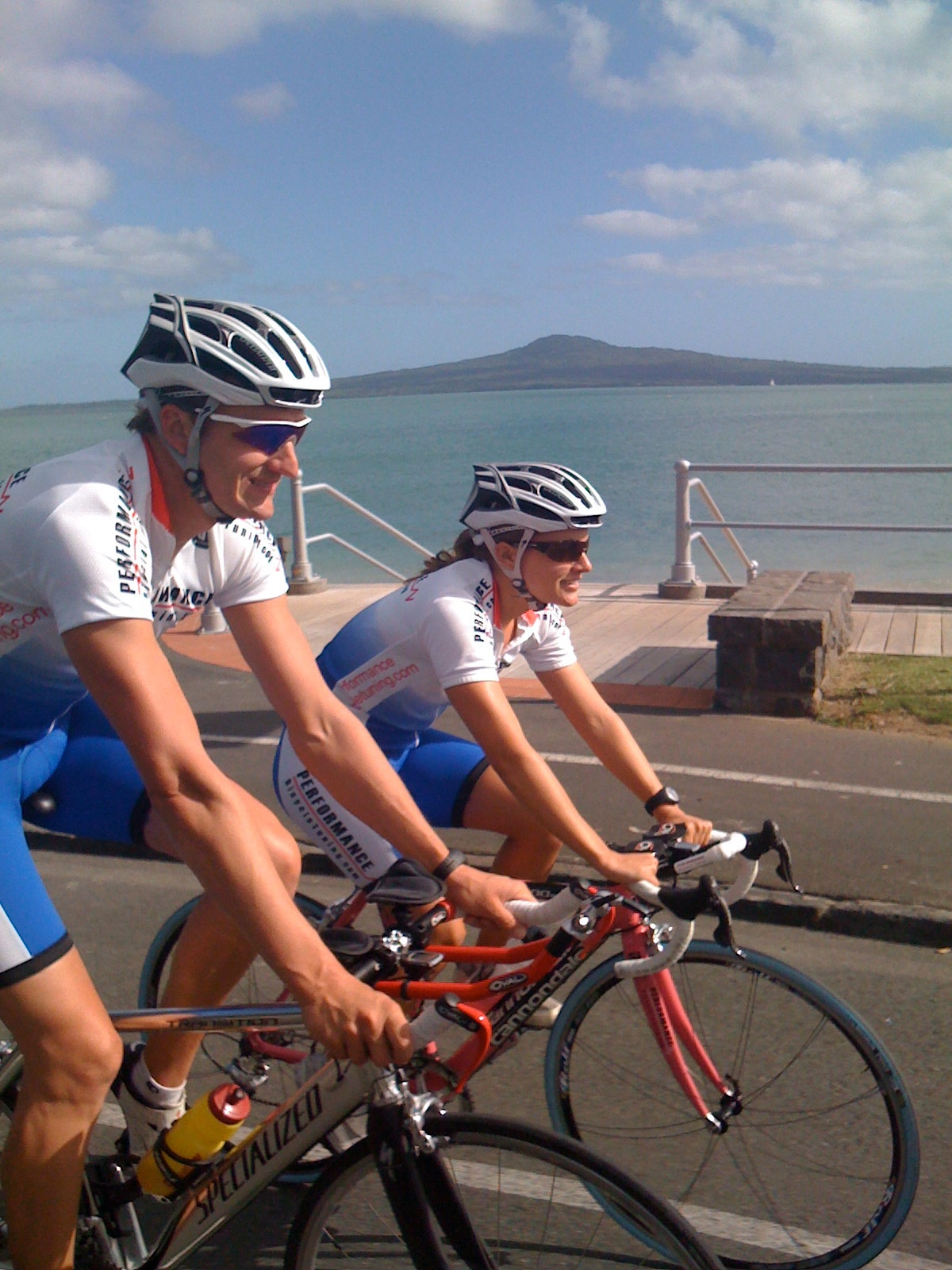
Sports cyclists on Tamaki Drive, the busiest cycling route of the city (which carries a lot of commuting bicycle traffic as well and sees over 200,000 cycling trips a year)

While most cycling takes place on normal public roads, there are a small number of dedicated off-road facilities available in Auckland. In many other places, plans for on-road or off-road routes have been mooted, but not yet realised. These include recreational mountain bike trails, pump tracks (short dirt tails) and BMX tracks which are scattered around Auckland and suit different cycling abilities. One of the largest and most well known mountain bike facilities in Auckland is Woodhill Forest, which is commercial.

Surveys show that a significant part of the population desires protected cycle facilities (i.e. off-road or separated from vehicle traffic), such facilities being desired by 55% of all respondents in an Auckland Transport study of a cross-section of Aucklanders.

As of early 2014, the target in the Auckland Plan was for 70% of the Auckland Cycle Network to be completed by 2020, however with the current funding, Council estimates that only 40–50% will be complete at that time.

=== Cycleways ===
Existing cycleways in Auckland primarily parallel motorways. They currently (as of 2010) consist of the Northwestern Cycleway, which was created along the Northwestern Motorway between the Auckland CBD and Lincoln in West Auckland (with some on-road sections on the way) and the Waikaraka Cycleway, from Wesley, Auckland to Southdown, most of it along State Highway 20 through southern Auckland City, before continuing along Mangere Harbour to the east.

Waitakere City Council also constructed a number of longer-distance off-road cycle paths, such as the routes that are part of the Project Twin Streams through the Henderson area, as well as the new cycle path along the Te Atatū Peninsula.

Overall, as of early 2014, Council notes an approximate 283 kilometres (176 mi) of cycle ways, "consisting of 95 km of cycle metros, 130 km of cycle connectors and 57 km of feeder routes that comprise of varying levels of service and cycle infrastructure provision. Parts of the existing network require cyclists to use bus/bike lanes and consist of short sections of unconnected cycle lanes, which advocacy groups do not consider to be an optimal solution in terms of safety".

Comparison of new cycleway per year and targets
Year	New cycleway (km)	AT Targets 2017 (km)	AT Targets 2019 (km)	AT Targets 2021 (km)
2016	11.8	7.4		
2017	14.2	16.4		
2018	6.5	28.8	10	
2019	9.65	2	10	
2020	6.09		10	10
2021	6.75		8.5	5
2022				7
2023				6

As of September 2021, Auckland Transport has not been able to meet its targets for newly constructed cycleways since 2017, even though the targets have decreased in subsequent years.

The New Lynn to Avondale shared path is a 2.9 km (1.8 mi) shared path that goes from the New Lynn railway station to Blockhouse Bay and crosses over the Whau River.

=== Bicycle rental ===
Auckland has a small bike rental scheme, Nextbike. It began with around 170 bicycles available at rental stations mostly in the CBD and the inner suburbs. The scheme ceased operation in 2010, and restarted in 2013 with only 13 bikes in 3 locations in downtown Auckland. In 2017, Auckland Transport began to investigate the feasibility of implementing their own bike rental scheme.

A dockless bikeshare operator, Onzo, launched in 2017. Their yellow bikes were deployed without any prior arrangement with local government. As of April 2021, Onzo has not renewed its license with Auckland Transport and the Companies Office has attempted to remove the business from its register.

== Proposals ==
=== Harbour link ===
One of the links most called-for by local cycling groups is a connection over the Waitematā Harbour between the Auckland city centre and the North Shore, where cyclists currently only have the option of a very distant detour, or of taking a ferry. There have been many recent history of attempts to provide walking and cycling access on Auckland Harbour Bridge.

The political and public relations campaign to provide a link led to one of the largest ever demonstrations of its kind in New Zealand, when in May 2009, several thousands of walkers and cyclists ignored police barriers and peacefully marched onto the motorway bridge, calling for the New Zealand Transport Agency to reconsider the walk/cycleway proposal.

Following years of campaigning a Harbour Bridge crossing, known as Skypath, was promised funding by the Labour Party in the lead-up to the 2017 general election. Once Labour was in government, the project was passed to the Waka Kotahi / NZ Transport Agency which released a revised design in 2019. In 2021 Waka Kotahi revealed that they were no longer able to build Skypath due to technical problems.

Following this news, non-profit cycle advocacy group Bike Auckland led the 2021 'Liberate the Lane' rally, advocating for one lane of the Harbour Bridge to be reallocated for walking and cycling. After the rally around 1000 people ignored police barriers and peacefully walked and cycled onto the motorway bridge calling for Waka Kotahi to have a three month trial of walking and cycling on one lane. Following the rally, Transport Minister Michael Wood released plans for a separate walking and cycling bridge across to the North Shore. Just months later, the plan was scrapped.

In July 2023 Bike Auckland released a report by SmartSense Limited, addressing key concerns about reallocating a lane on the motor bridge to walking and cycling, and proposing a design solution to mitigate safety concerns.

On 6 August 2023, Waka Kotahi announced their Waitematā Harbour Crossings plan which includes a tunnel for light rail and a tunnel for motor traffic under the harbour, and walking and cycling on two lanes of the existing Harbour Bridge. Construction is expected to start by 2029. Waka Kotahi's forecast is that 6400 people would walk and cycle across the Auckland Harbour Bridge every day.

Bike Auckland continues to advocate for Waka Kotahi to Liberate the Lane, stating that Waka Kotahi's Waitematā connections project will take too long to deliver a walking and cycling connection across the harbour. Their campaign has attracted the support of a diverse array of organisations, calling for Waka Kotahi to liberate the lane now to give Aucklanders more affordable and sustainable transport options, and that it would be a key symbol of climate action.

== See also ==
- Cycling in New Zealand
- Cycling in Wellington
- Bike Auckland
- Transport in Auckland
