= Cycling in Wellington =

Cycling is a mode of transport which has historically had high levels of modal share in Wellington, New Zealand. However, the dominance of the car in the city and broader changes in transport patterns have made it a very marginal transport mode by the 21st century. Following a national decline in utility cycling levels post-WW2, cycling as a mode of everyday transport within Wellington began a slow resurgence in the 1970s, and the 2000s saw renewed advocacy and new infrastructure projects.

== History ==
=== 19th century: early days ===
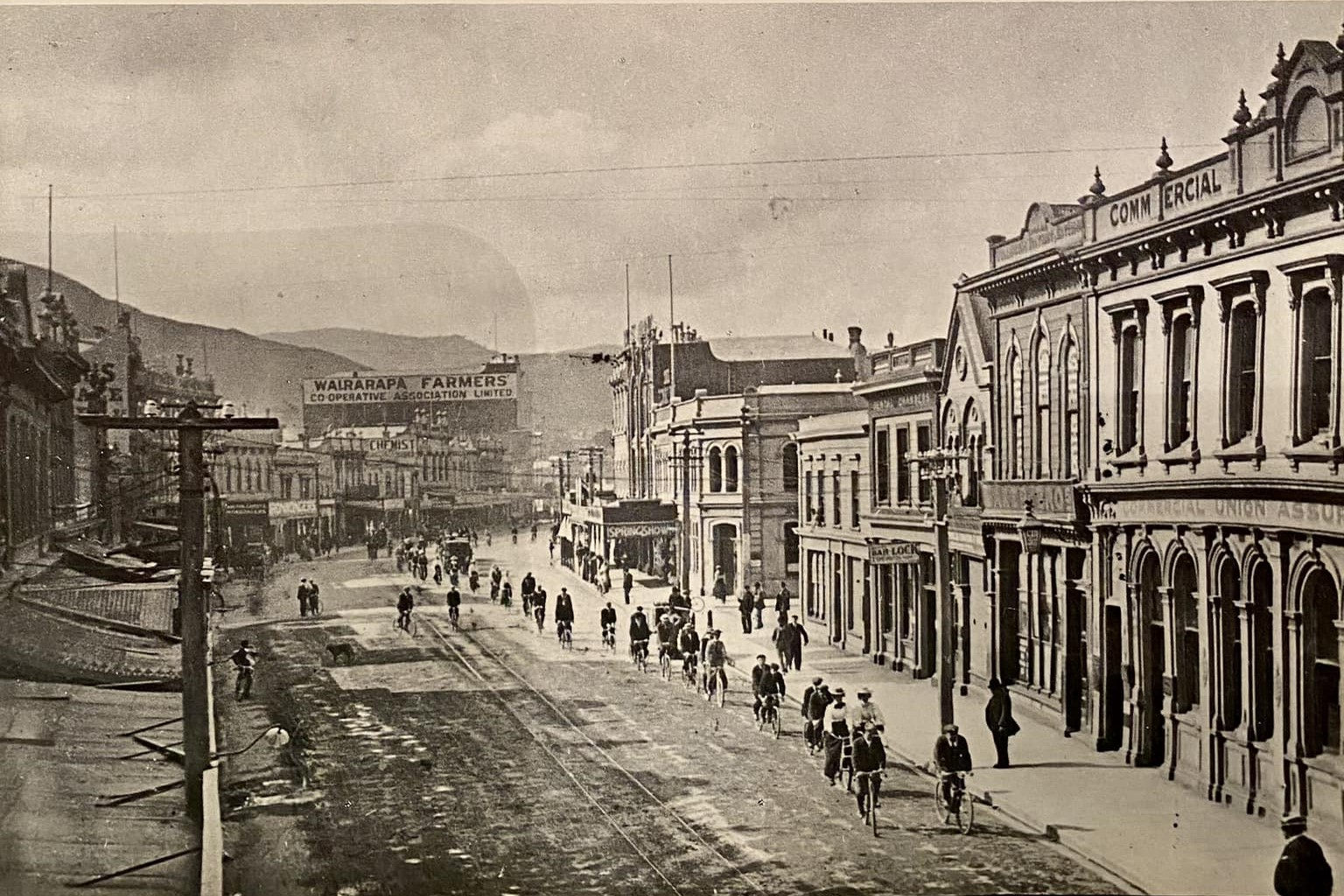
A line of men and women cycling south along Lambton Quay, organised by the Wellington Cycling Club, c. 1902

The bicycle was first introduced to Wellington in 1869 with the arrival of the velocipede. In August of that year, a former Wellington Fire Brigade captain rode his velocipede to a blaze, demonstrating its potential as a fast and practical means of transport in an urban setting. Throughout the 1870s, the velocipede dominated streets until it was eventually superseded by the penny-farthing. Wellington had cycling clubs relatively early in New Zealand, with the Wellington Bicycle and Tricycle Club launched in 1881. By the early 1890s, women were also riding bicycles and soon formed their own clubs. A report from 1896 noted that as many as 150 women could regularly be seen cycling in Wellington.

The 1890s saw the arrival of the "safety bicycle", which used a chain drive rather than pedals fixed directly to the front wheel, as on the penny-farthing. Coupled with the newly developed pneumatic tyre, this design made cycling faster, safer, and much more suitable for women and children, quickly establishing the bicycle as an affordable means of personal transport around Wellington. In 1897, Wellington City Council passed a by-law to curb "scorching"—the practice of cycling fast along city streets— by having a maximum speed around corners of 8 miles per hour. That same year, letters to the editor of The Evening Post expressed concern that mixing pedestrians, cyclists, and horse-drawn cars on the same roads, without any form of separation, was becoming increasingly dangerous.

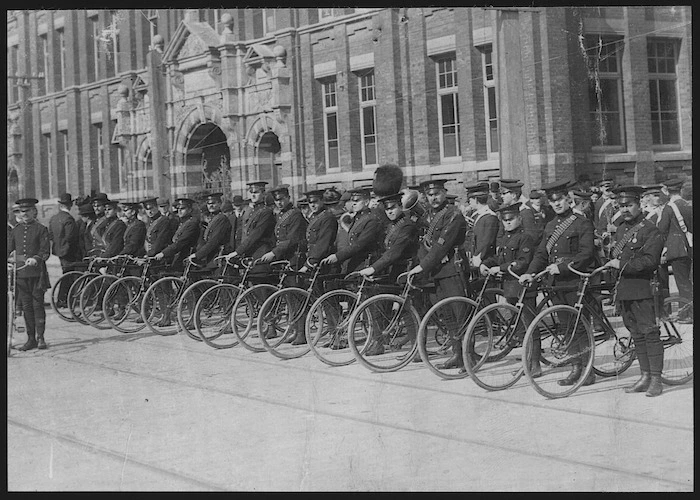
Photograph of the Wellington Cycle Corps, c. 1912

By the late 1890s, public pressure grew for the City Council to provide separate cycle tracks, eight to nine feet wide, along routes such as Clyde Quay, Thorndon Esplanade, Thorndon Quay and a track from Hutt Road to Ngauranga. In 1899, the City Engineer submitted a proposal to the City Council advocating for the construction of a cycle track along Kent and Cambridge Terraces. During this period, cycling had become firmly woven into city life: Oriental Bay was a favourite route for riders, and in winter the Basin Reserve served as a popular place for beginners to learn to cycle.

Female cyclists were often hindered by restrictive dresses, though some—controversially—began adopting knickerbockers or bloomers, influenced by the rational dress movement. By the 1900s cycling had become a major fad in Wellington, embraced by both men and women.

The bicycle was adopted as a practical means of transport; by 1905 police were using bicycles. Tall bicycles were built for use by street lamp lighters.

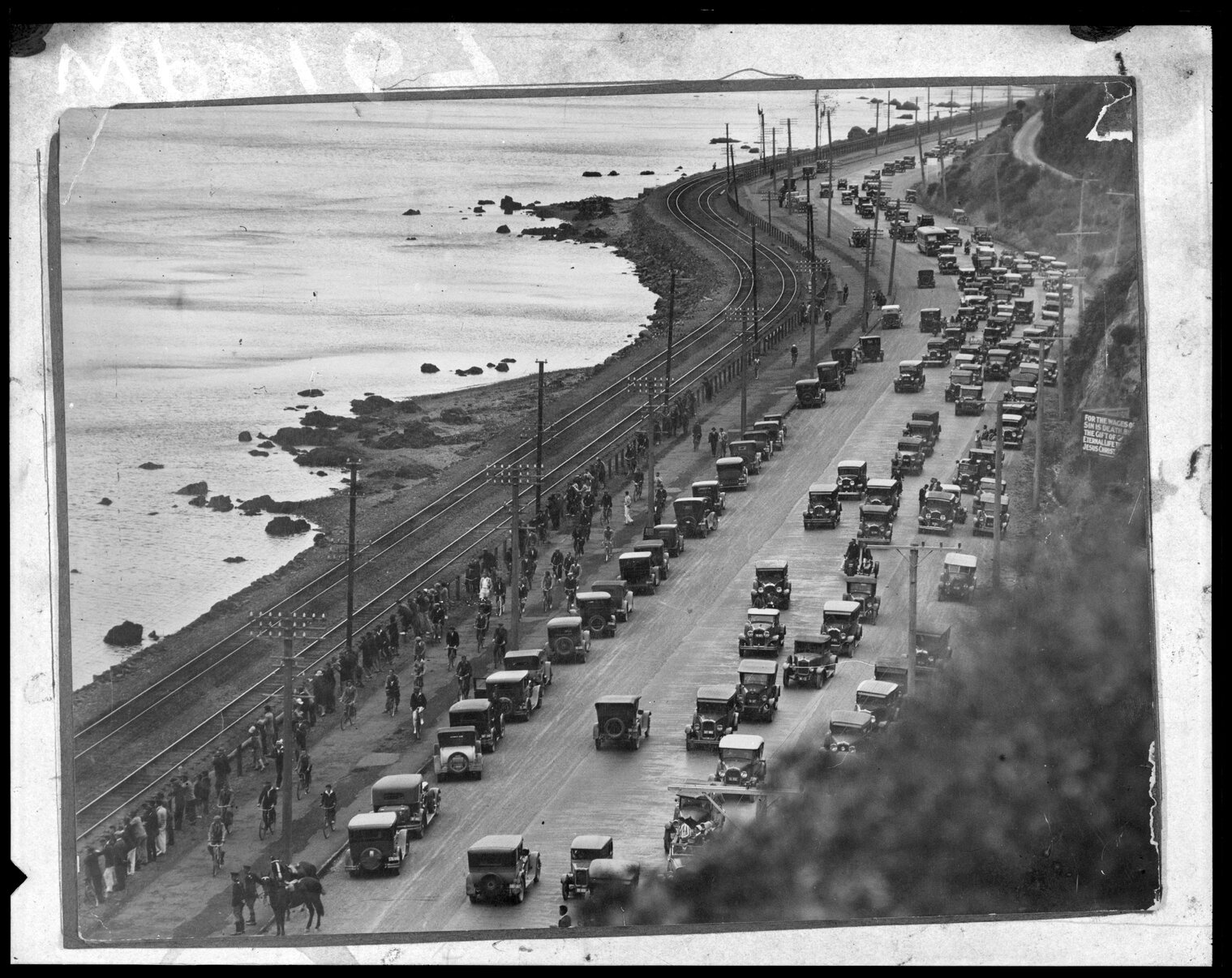
In between the railway and the Hutt Road was the original cycle-track, c. 1930s

=== 20th century ===
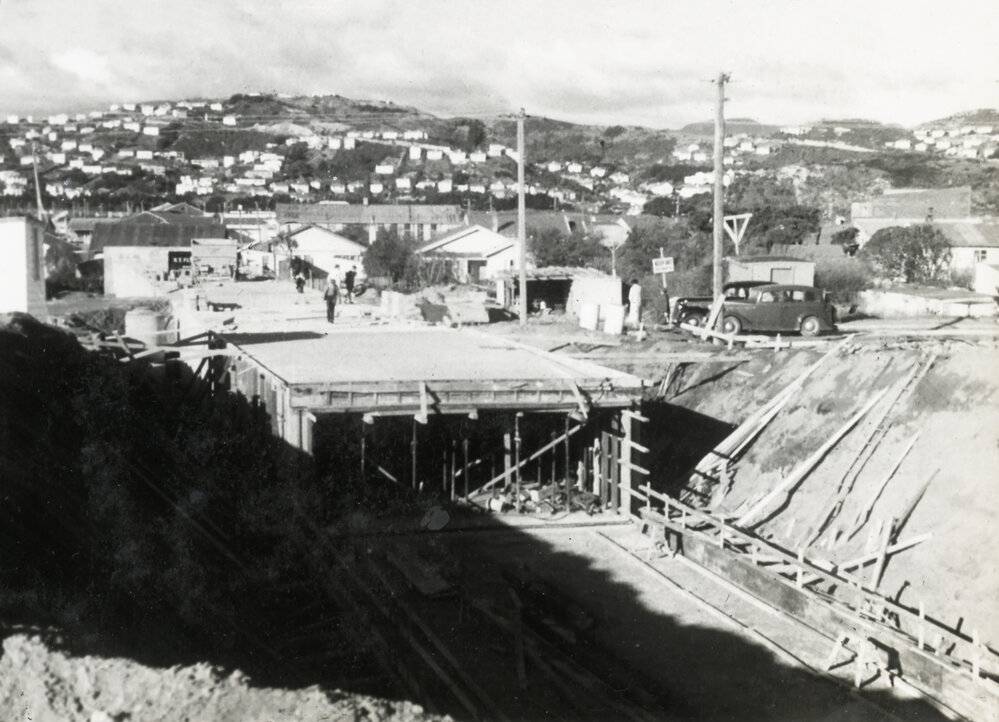
Construction of the pedestrian and cycle subway, c. 1957

In 1901, a proposal was made to establish a legal framework for cyclists to contribute financially to the construction of a cycle track connecting Wellington to Lower Hutt. The proposed annual contribution from each cyclist was five shillings. This proposal received widespread agreement from almost all cyclists in Wellington. That same year, the City Council accepted a tender to construct a cycle track on Clyde Quay, with work scheduled to begin in 1903. When the track was eventually completed, pedestrians used it, leading to conflicts and accidents between them and cyclists.

In 1903 the Hutt Road Improvement Act was passed, recommending a 15-foot-wide cycle track along Hutt Road to connect Wellington with the Hutt Valley. The Railway Department undertook the construction, but instead of building a segregated cycle track, they created a 20-foot-wide shared path for pedestrians and cyclists. Construction commenced in December 1903.

When the Great Depression hit, both bicycle and motor car sales decreased, but the bicycle quickly recovered. By the 1930s, cycle touring had become a popular pastime among Wellingtonians.

From the 1950s, the government invested heavily in motorways. In 1957, Wellington Mayor Frank Kitts announced the construction of a combined pedestrian and cycle subway beneath Wellington Airport. The structure was designed to provide a safe and direct link between Coutts Street in Kilbirnie and Miro Street in Rongotai, areas that would otherwise be divided by the runway expansion. The subway was 798 feet long and 22 feet 8 inches wide. Within this space, a raised pedestrian footpath 5 feet 3 inches wide was provided alongside a 9-foot cycleway at a cost of £NZ81,000.

When Robert Muldoon opened a section of the Wellington motorway in 1978, 75 protesting cyclists rushed into the Terrace Tunnel. The oil shocks of the 1970s triggered the first of several bicycle resurgences. In 1993, 34 percent of people in the Wellington Region had tried cycling at least once over the previous 12 months. In June 1995, Transit New Zealand built a cycleway costing $160,000 under the overbridge on the Ngauranga Gorge road at the Newlands intersection.

In November 1996, the Cycling Action Network (CAN) was founded in Wellington, becoming a leading national voice for cycling advocacy. Since then, CAN has championed safer, more accessible cycling infrastructure across Wellington and New Zealand.

In June 1995, Transit New Zealand proposed a two-way off-road cycle path running from Cambridge Terrace to the Terrace Tunnel as part of stage two of the Wellington Inner City Bypass project. The path was eventually completed in 2007, providing a link for cyclists through the bypass corridor. The cycle path alternates between shared and separate spaces, leading to pedestrian conflict.

Mākara Peak Mountain Bike Park opened in 1998, when the Wellington City Council set aside 200 hectares of retired farmland in Karori southwest of Wellington for its development. Work on the park began almost immediately, driven largely by volunteers who planted trees, removed pest animals, and carved out new tracks.

=== 21st century: renewed interest ===
Early in 2001, the City Council planned to install a 2-metre cycle lane on Thorndon Quay, and around 200 people submitted their views, with about 80 opposing it. In April 2002, 40 car parks were removed between Tinakori Road and the railway station to paint a cycle lane between parked vehicles and the traffic lane. By the late 2010s, there was a growing political and institutional appetite in Wellington for a substantially expanded network of separated cycleways. The City Council announced in December 2013 that it would triple the cycling budget from $1.5m to $4.5m. The city's 2015 cycling master-planning laid out a long-term vision. Still, early projects (notably the Island Bay cycleway) generated public controversy and legal challenge, slowing delivery.

== Facilities ==
=== Tactical urbanism ===
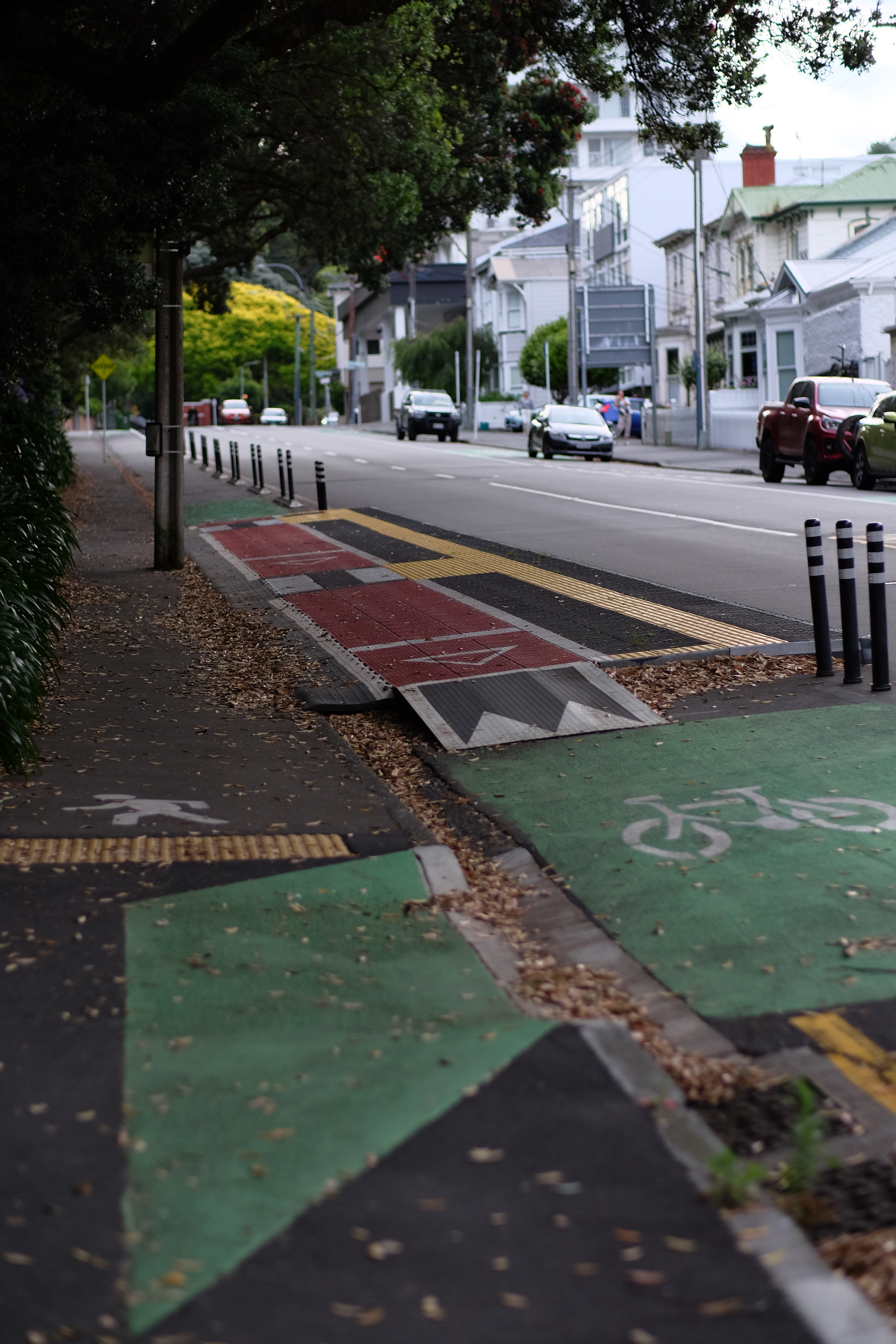
An uphill in-lane floating bus stop on the Botanic Garden route

Rather than seeking only high-cost, fully engineered schemes, Wellington adopted a "cheaper, faster, lighter" approach, described as tactical urbanism. This method uses lower-cost materials to deliver routes more quickly, while allowing designs to remain flexible and responsive to community feedback ahead of more permanent changes. Design work and public engagement continued in parallel.

International figures and bodies have highlighted Wellington as an instructive example; Former New York City transportation commissioner Janette Sadik-Khan and other city-planning commentators have praised the approach for demonstrating how quickly cities can trial and scale protected infrastructure. The shift followed years of frustration over the over-engineered and costly Island Bay cycleway—part of a 2015 cycling master plan—which stalled at the suburb's edge after prolonged controversy and legal challenges.

In 2021, Councillor Tamatha Paul secured an amendment to Wellington's long-term plan, allocating $226 million over a ten-year period to complete the city’s cycling master plan network. The master plan aimed to create an interconnected network of cycleways linking the city centre with suburbs across Wellington, including Tawa, Johnsonville, Karori, Ōwhiro Bay, Island Bay, Lyall Bay, Seatoun, and Miramar.

Alongside the Council’s investment, the cycling network was to be delivered in partnership with Let's Get Wellington Moving, which planned to install up to 33 km of additional cycling infrastructure, primarily within the CBD.

At the time, Wellington had just 23 km (14 mi) of dedicated cycleways, mainly along the coast. Tactical urbanism techniques—designing and engaging with the public simultaneously—cut build times from the usual 3–10 years to an average of 18 months per cycleway.

Problematic sections were addressed with low-cost, adaptable solutions, while permanent stretches received concrete dividers and tree planters. Practical tweaks were also made to accommodate other road users: speed bumps were reshaped for quicker fire truck exits, a loading zone was created for a car dealership, and barriers outside a bus depot were removed to allow easier bus turns.

By 2023, cycleways serving Newtown to Berhampore, the Botanic Garden, Aro Valley, and Ngaio had been completed. Six additional major cycleway projects were completed in 2024 in Kilbirnie, Thorndon, Karori, Wadestown, and Brooklyn, expanding the network to 73 km, with a target of 166 km (103 mi) by 2030. As of June 2025 38% of the cycling network is now in place.

The first two of the new bike lanes (Newtown to City and Botanic Garden route) cost about NZ$750,000 per kilometre, considerably below the national average of NZ$1.6 million per kilometre, and were delivered in under half the usual time. The Newtown to City route (2.1 km) was completed in under two years with street changes including bus lanes, separated bike lanes, and relocated bus stops.

Te Āti Awa Taranaki Whānui has collaborated with the City Council to incorporate a te ao Māori perspective into the city's cycling infrastructure. Bikeways now feature niho taniwha motifs and other cultural markers intended to acknowledge ancestral narratives and local landscape histories.

Challenges remain. Foodstuffs threatened legal action over a planned route past its Thorndon store. The city's ten-year cycling budget was cut in 2023 from $191 million to $111 million.

=== Cycleways ===
==== Ngauranga ====
By the 1970s, the cycle track wedged between the railway line and the state highway had deteriorated significantly. It had been reduced to a single lane and was cut off at both ends by highway traffic lanes. The surface of the track is very rough for most of its length, with broken glass and other rubbish appearing on it. Most cyclists elected to ride on the highway shoulder towards Wellington, and had no option but to ride on the shoulder towards Petone.

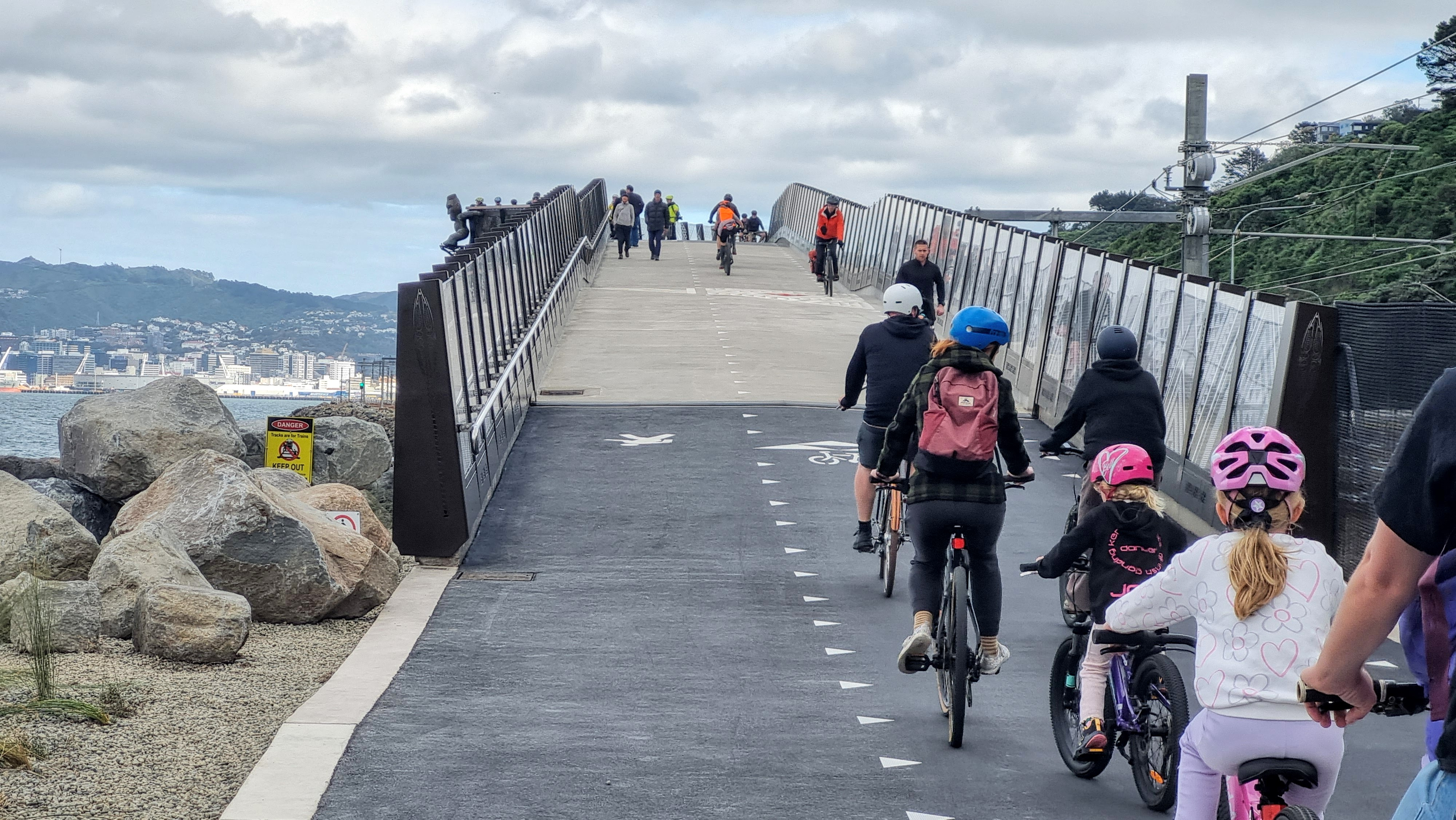
Looking south at the overbridge, opening day 16 May 2026.

Following severe flooding in 2013 and 2015, it became evident that Wellington required a seawall to safeguard the railway line and highway linking the city to the Hutt Valley. In response to these longstanding issues, a solution has now been completed. The construction of a seawall strengthened protection for the railway line and state highway along Wellington Harbour, and created the opportunity to incorporate a shared walking and cycling path along its top, providing a public amenity at relatively little additional cost.

Ngā Ūranga ki Pito One is a 4.5 kilometres-long seawall and shared walking and cycling path running along the harbour front beside the railway line from Honiana Te Puni Reserve at Petone to the Ngauranga Interchange. Officially opened on 16 May 2026, the project now connects Wellington’s cycling and walking network with the Hutt Valley, providing a safer and more accessible route for commuters and recreational users.

==== Island Bay ====
In 2014, the City Council planned to upgrade the unprotected bike lane in Island Bay. In June 2015, Wellington City Council approved its first separated cycleway, authorising construction of a $1.5 million section of the Island Bay–CBD cycleway along The Parade. The project was selected as a pilot for kerbside protection. Construction began on 28 September 2015, with completion targeted for February 2016. The design featured a one-way bike lane on each side of the street, positioned directly against the kerb, with parking spaces acting as a buffer between cyclists and traffic lanes, and would not go through the shopping village.

In 2017, the City Council approved a revised design intended to address issues identified in an independent safety audit. The plan recommended changes to on-street parking along The Parade to improve visibility for both cyclists and motorists, as well as increasing spacing between parking bays to make it easier for vehicles to re-enter traffic from driveways and off-street parking. In November 2021, two redesign options were released: a lower-cost $3 million plan that could be completed within a year, and a more extensive $14 million version projected to take 18–24 months. Both proposals included extending the cycleway through the Island Bay shopping village, addressing one of the original scheme's most criticised omissions.

In December 2022, the Regulatory Processes Committee of Wellington City Council approved updated traffic resolutions for a redesigned cycle route through the Island Bay shopping village, with works integrated into broader streetscape and landscaping upgrades. The Island Bay cycleway has been integrated into Wellington's wider cycling network, serving as a key commuter link.

==== Hutt Road ====
By the 1990s, the designated cycleway along Hutt Road had become increasingly compromised, with sections routinely used as a loading zone for trucks and illegal car parking. The City Council allowed it because it had been happening for so long. This forced many cyclists to ride on the road, despite heavy traffic volumes, as it was often safer and more direct than navigating the obstructed path.

On 16 March 2016, the City Council launched a public consultation proposing upgrades to the existing shared path along Hutt Road. At the time, the route was widely regarded as outdated and unsafe due to its narrow width, poor surface quality, and numerous driveway crossings. It carried over 300 daily cycle commuters from Lower Hutt, with a further 200 from Khandallah and Ngaio.

In May 2016, the Council announced that improvements would be delivered in stages. Preliminary site work for the first phase began in April 2017, with full-scale construction starting the following month. By December 2018, major works were largely complete across most of the walking and biking paths, except for a key bottleneck—the Kaiwharawhara Stream bridge. Construction on widening of the bridge began on August 26, 2019. The upgraded Hutt Road separated cycle and walking paths officially opened on 11 November 2019. The redesign included fully separated bike and pedestrian paths, improved lighting, landscaping, and the installation of a real-time cycle counter to monitor usage.

==== Thorndon Quay ====
On 29 March 2017, the first of many workshops was held to see how the City Council could improve cycling along Thorndon Quay. The objective was to improve safety and reliability, particularly by separating cycling movements from heavy traffic and frequent bus operations. By February 2020, the corridor was folded into the Let's Get Wellington Moving. In November 2022 presented the full street design, traffic resolution, and proposed speed changes. The package included a new two-way cycle path on the harbour side of Thorndon Quay to minimise bus and side-street conflicts, five raised signalised crossings, peak-hour bus lanes in both directions, improved lighting and planting, and revised parking layouts and time limits. Funding and approvals followed in mid-2023. Construction began in late 2023, staged to manage impacts on businesses and commuters. In April 2024, the City Council announced it was taking over several LGWM projects, including Thorndon Quay. The Thorndon Quay upgrade project was completed on 15 July 2025.

=== Cycle parking ===
The City Council's ongoing efforts to bolster cycling infrastructure include expanding bike parking availability across the city. In 2016, the council added three new bicycle parks, or 'corrals', in Ghuznee, Cuba, and Wigan streets. By mid-2021, the City Council had installed 52 new bike racks, bringing total rack numbers to approximately 650, with capacity for around 1,300 bikes. The installations also included six new "fix-it" repair stands. The City Council has introduced covered bike shelters to protect against the elements and provide secure storage. In July 2023, they installed one at Freyberg Pool, including relocatable container-style shelters with double-tiered bike racks offering parking for 24 bikes each.

Council staff proposed introducing a minimum bike parking requirement for new apartments. The rule would have required developers to allocate 2.5 square metres of space per unit, with access to electricity, enough to accommodate even large electric cargo bikes. Councillor Ben McNulty moved an amendment to remove the requirement, and a majority of councillors supported his change.

=== Proposals ===
A second Mount Victoria Tunnel was to be prioritised for buses and have dedicated facilities for walking and cycling. Following the 2023 general election, the new government scrapped the initiative and changed these plans into a tunnel for general traffic.

Let's Get Wellington Moving was intended to construct bike lanes in the CBD, while Wellington City Council would handle the suburban routes. Since LGWM was shut down, that part of the network has languished.

=== Criticism ===
While cycling infrastructure in Wellington has expanded over recent years, cycleway projects have drawn significant criticism from small businesses and members of the public due to the removal of on-street parking. (Note: Attributed to multiple sources:) Some business owners blamed cycle lanes for closures, and people objected to the loss of on-street parking outside the Botanic Garden. Several commentators have questioned whether Wellington's hilly topography and climate make cycleways impractical or ill-conceived. Luke Pierson, a businessman and lobbyist, argued that cycling in Wellington would not be widely adopted by anyone outside an "elite" demographic. The Canadian filmmaker James Cameron made complaints about the Newtown-to-City cycleway. Councillor Ray Chung has been a vocal critic of speed bumps, raised pedestrian crossings, and cycle lanes. Firefighters also warned that the Island Bay cycle lane would leave less space for cars to pull over in emergencies. Newstalk ZB host Mike Hosking has been a vocal critic of Wellington's cycleways, frequently questioning both their cost and the number of people using them.

== Integration ==
=== On public transport ===
Bikes are permitted on trains when space is available, but staff may refuse carriage during busy periods. Folding bikes are allowed on trains at any time. On the Hutt Valley, Melling, Kāpiti, and Johnsonville lines, each two-car train can accommodate up to three bikes in designated areas. On the Wairarapa Line, bikes can be carried in the luggage car. Metlink buses are equipped with front-mounted bike racks.

On 8 November 2024, a complete ban on front-mounted bike racks on buses began nationwide. This followed an initial night-time ban that came into effect on 2 November. Provision of bike racks was suspended due to NZTA concerns over "ensuring bike racks do not obscure bus headlamps, enabling full visibility in all weather conditions and during hours of darkness, including when travelling through tunnels". On 1 July 2025 bike racks on the front of Metlink buses were again permitted to be used by cyclists.

== Statistics ==
Cycling in Wellington has declined significantly from its historic popularity. By 1986, only 1.4% of residents were travelling by bike. In 1996 it had risen to 1.9%. Between 2001 and 2006, it accounted for just 2% of travel in the city. By 2013, however, the cycling mode share had risen to 4.3%, reflecting a modest resurgence in its use.

In the 2020s, Wellington began to see sharper increases in cycling volumes as new infrastructure projects were opened. The Newtown to City route experiences significant usage: monthly bike trips increased by ~62% (Note: From ≈around 5,990 to nearly 10,000.) between July 2022 and July 2024. The Botanic Garden to waterfront route saw a ~27.5% increase in biking / scootering usage, with 74% of users reporting feeling safer post-installation.

== See also ==
- Cycling in New Zealand
- Cycling in Auckland
- Bike Auckland
