= Tamatha Paul =

New Zealand activist and politician (born 1997)

Tamatha Paul MP
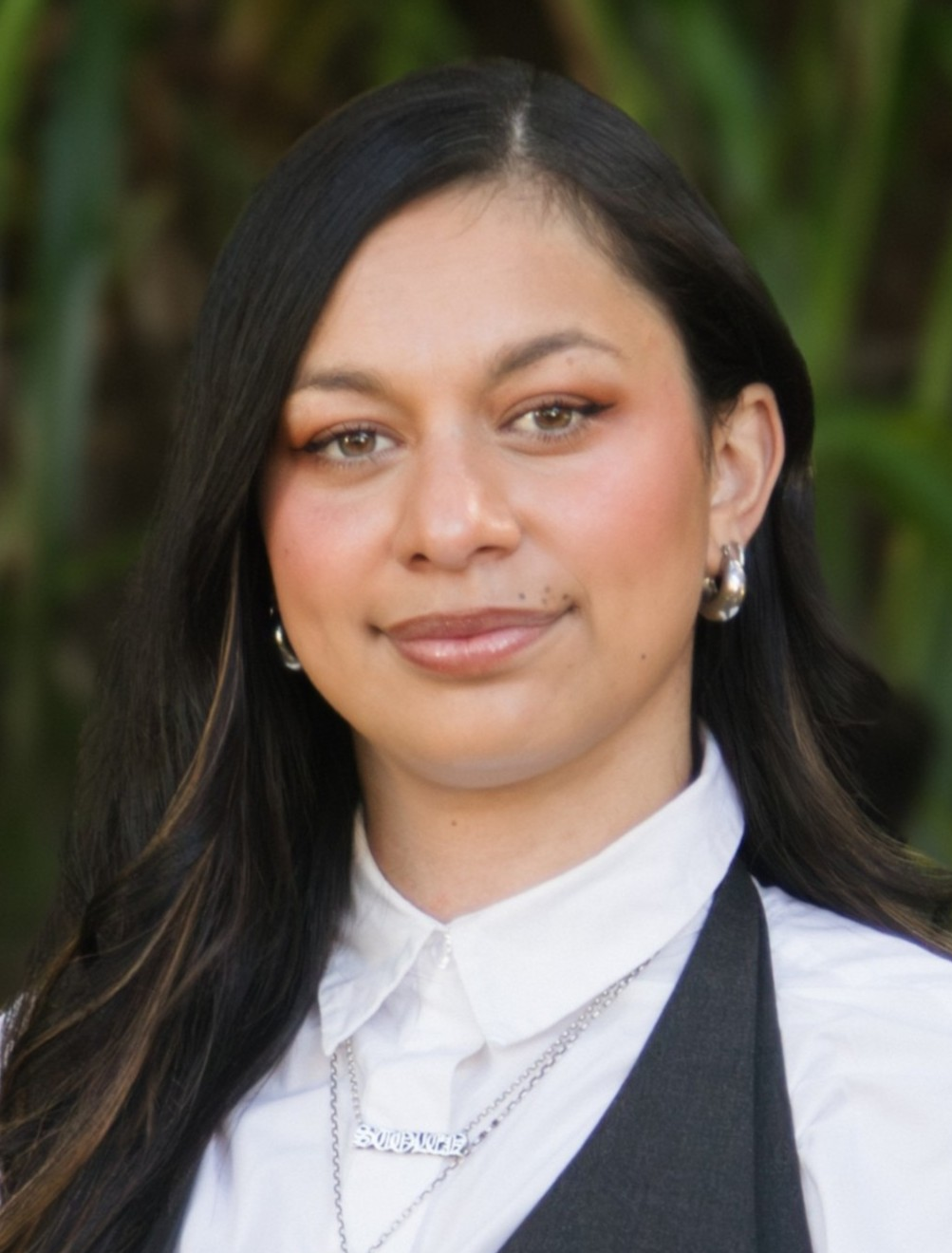

Member of the New Zealand Parliament for Wellington Central
- Incumbent
- Assumed office 14 October 2023
- Preceded by: Grant Robertson
- Majority: 6,066

Wellington City Councillor for Pukehīnau/Lambton Ward
- In office 19 October 2019 – 10 November 2023 Serving with Iona Pannett and Nicola Young
- Preceded by: Brian Dawson
- Succeeded by: Geordie Rogers

President of Victoria University of Wellington Students' Association
- In office 2019–2020
- Preceded by: Marlon Drake
- Succeeded by: Geo Robrigado

Personal details
- Born: Tamatha-Kaye Erin Paul; 1997 (age 28–29) Auckland, New Zealand
- Party: Green (2022–present)
- Other political affiliations: Independent (2019–2022)
- Education: Victoria University of Wellington (BA); Massey University (MRP)

Tamatha-Kaye Erin Paul (born 1997) is a New Zealand activist and Green Party politician. She has been a Member of Parliament in the House of Representatives for the Wellington North electorate since 2023.

== Early life and education ==
Paul was born in South Auckland in 1997 and lived in Christchurch until moving at age eight with her family to Tokoroa. She is of Māori and European descent, with her father of Waikato Tainui and Ngāti Awa origin, while her mother is of English, Scottish and Spanish ancestry. Paul attended school in Tokoroa and was dux of Tokoroa High School in 2015. At age 12, Paul was diagnosed with the autoimmune disease lupus, the youngest person in the Waikato region to be diagnosed with it.

Paul received a $30,000 First in Family scholarship from Victoria University of Wellington, and in 2018, she graduated with a Bachelor of Arts in international relations and political science. Paul also received the Andrea Brander Accommodation Scholarship, the James MacIntosh Scholarship for achievement, and was on the Dean's List for Academic Excellence. Paul graduated with a Master of Resource and Environmental Planning from Massey University in 2022.

== Political career ==
=== Victoria University of Wellington Students' Association ===
In 2016, Paul was elected as Equity Officer of the Victoria University of Wellington Students' Association (VUWSA), and in 2017, she was elected Engagement Vice-President. In 2018, Paul was elected to the position of President of VUWSA with 58% of votes cast. Paul was the second Māori and first female Māori to be elected to the role. During her time as president, Paul worked on the issues of climate change, sexual violence and mental health, and achieved extra mental health and counselling services for students at Victoria University of Wellington.

=== Wellington City Council ===
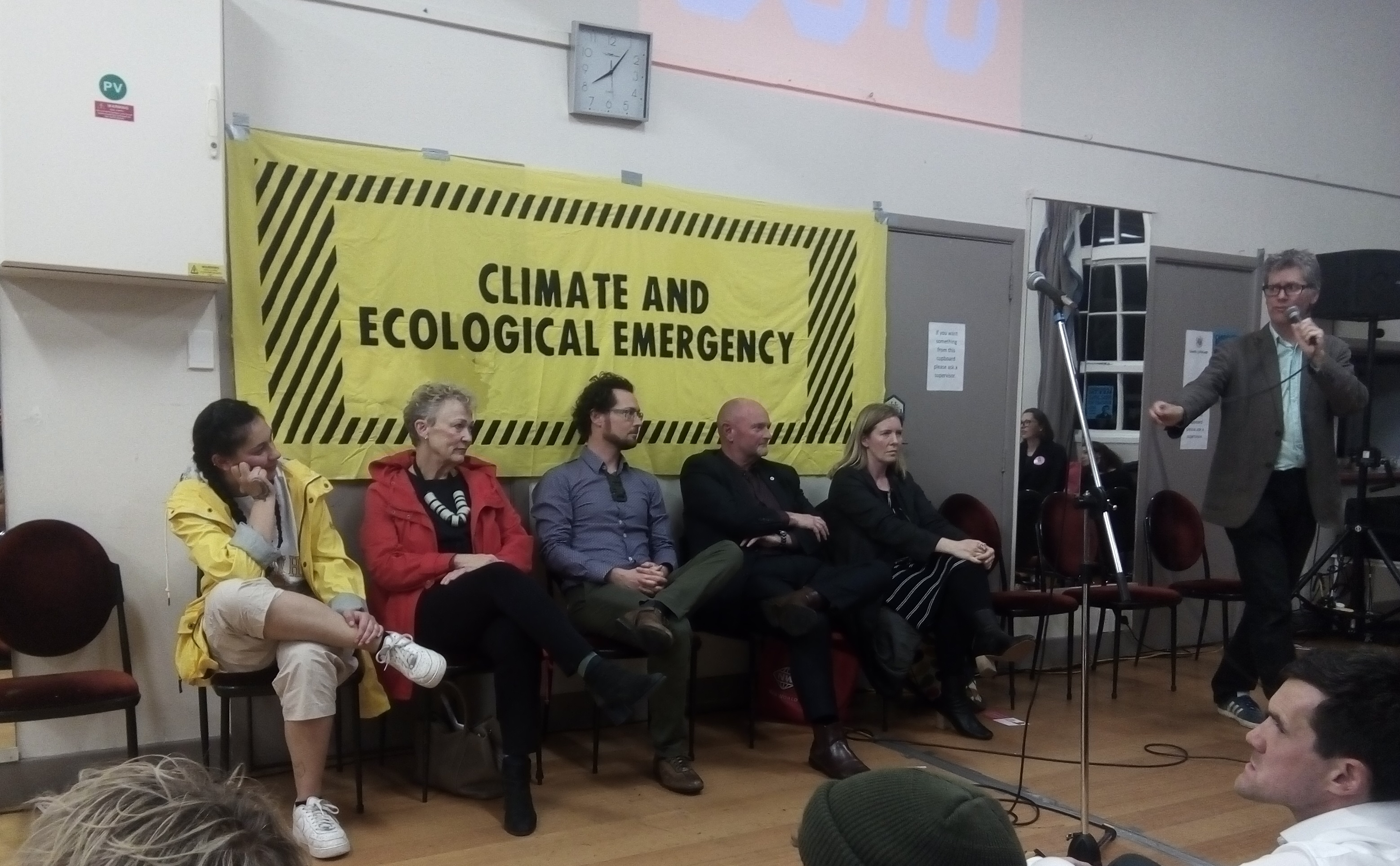
Wellington City Council candidates for the Lambton Ward at the 2019 Aro Valley candidates meeting

In the 2019 Wellington local elections, Paul was elected to the Wellington City Council in the Pukehīnau/Lambton Ward. Paul campaigned on issues such as environmental policy, representation for minority and youth communities, and an aspiration for a living wage policy. Paul was inspired to run after she clashed with councillors over a plan to introduce a liquor ban in Kelburn Park, a popular drinking spot for students in Wellington. Paul argued that by introducing this ban, students would be pushed to drink in other, more unsafe areas. The liquor ban never went ahead.

Paul was considered part of a 'youthquake', a movement of young people in New Zealand running for local government, in 2019. This included six Wellingtonians under 25 running campaigns for local councils.

In April 2022, ahead of the 2022 Wellington local elections, incumbent Green councillor Iona Pannett was not reselected for the party's candidacy for the Pukehīnau/Lambton Ward election. In May, Paul announced that she had joined the Green Party and was seeking selection as the party's candidate for the ward, which she received in June. Paul was re-elected as city councillor for Pukehīnau/Lambton Ward in 2022.

Paul was elected by significant margins in both her terms as councillor. In 2019, Paul won her seat with 2,770 votes, just 500 votes shy of the top-voted councillor of the ward, Iona Pannett. However, in 2022, Paul overtook Pannett and won the ward with a significant 5,206 votes, a number of votes which could elect 2.5 councillors.

=== Parliamentary career ===
New Zealand Parliament
Years	Term	Electorate	List	Party
2023–2026	54th	Wellington Central	none	Green
2026–present	55th	Wellington North	4	Green

In 2023, Paul announced she was seeking party selection for the parliamentary electorate of Wellington Central after both incumbent MP Grant Robertson and Green co-leader and previous party candidate James Shaw announced they would not run for the electorate in 2023. Paul won selection and became the Green candidate for Wellington Central, an electorate largely recognised as a Labour 'safe seat'. On 14 October, Paul defeated Labour's candidate Ibrahim Omer by a margin of 6,066 votes, becoming the electorate's first ever Green representative as well as the first ever Māori representative for the area.

On 30 October, Paul resigned her seat on the Wellington City Council effective on 10 November 2023 and was sworn into Parliament on 5 December 2023.

Paul is the Green Party's Justice, Housing, Police, Courts, Corrections, Youth, and Wellington Issues spokesperson.

During the 2026 New Zealand general election, Paul was ranked fourth on the Green Party list. She contested the Wellington North electorate. On 7 November, Paul retained Wellington North by a large margin of 3,006 votes based on preliminary results.

== Political positions ==
=== Housing ===
Paul supports housing density and ensuring housing is available to all. During her time as councillor, Paul chaired the Kōrau Tūāpapa Environment and Infrastructure Committee, where she led the IRRS 4 All campaign, which helped thousands of low-income tenants access rent subsidies. As chair, Paul also campaigned for an ambitious spatial plan for Wellington which aims to address the housing crisis by increasing housing capacity and encouraging density in the inner-city. Additionally, Paul assisted the Mayoral taskforce for social housing as tenant liaison, a programme aimed to help people in Wellington access social housing, and led a housing pilot which provided tenants with an official check on the quality of their accommodation - a service in partnership with central government with the aim to uphold and enforce the Healthy Homes Standards. Paul led the WCC Housing Action Plan, a plan which prioritised: Planning for Growth, Consenting Improvements, Mana whenua and Māori housing, Homelessness, Social and public housing, Affordable housing and Private rental housing. The plan included targets for social, public and private housing development as well as initiatives to reduce homelessness in Wellington. On 10 November 2020, Paul voted in favour to sell 0.3 hectares of land and lease a further 0.6 hectares in Shelly Bay to The Wellington Company for housing development along with Wellington City councillors Day, Diane Calvert, Jenny Condie, Fleur Fitzsimons, Laurie Foon, Rebecca Matthews, Teri O'Neill, and Nicola Young.

As Wellington Central MP, and the Greens' Housing spokesperson, Paul has continued advocating for affordable and healthy housing for New Zealanders. In April 2024, Housing Minister Chris Bishop announced that his National-led government would be reversing amendments to the Residential Tenancies Act which were made by the Labour government in 2021. Paul challenged these changes, specifically the re-introduction of 90-day no cause evictions of tenants and the reduction of landlords' notice periods for tenants, stating that "Housing is a human right, and every person deserves a warm, safe and affordable home, whether they own that home or not [...] The playing field is uneven and these changes to tenancy rules further tip the balance in favour of landlords." Paul has also been outspoken about the government's recent policy changes in relation to New Zealand's public housing provider, Kāinga Ora, making it easier for the provider to evict 'unruly' public housing tenants. Paul stated that these changes show that the government are "Ignorant to the consequences of poverty [...] [and these changes will] result in a proliferation of poverty and trauma across our most vulnerable communities".

=== Transport ===
Paul supports accessible public transport for all, and especially supports public transport as a form of climate action. In 2022, as councillor and Let's Get Wellington Moving (LGWM) Governance member, Paul secured an additional $100m over the next ten years for Wellington's bike network. This network prioritised dedicated cycle lanes on roads, a protection for cyclists which aims to promote the use of cycling and reduce our reliance on cars. Paul stated that this plan would make cycling safer and encourage non-traditional cyclists such as children, women, and gender diverse people to bike around the city. Cyclists were "not just dudes in lycra", she said.

Paul also advocates for pedestrianisation. As councillor, Paul passed an amendment for Wellington City Council to investigate a low-traffic/pedestrianised future for Dixon and Upper Cuba Street, two busy streets in Wellington. Paul also supports projects such as the LGWM golden mile project that plans to pedestrianise the Parliament end of Lambton Quay, along Willis and Manners Streets, to the entertainment hub of Courtenay Place in Wellington. Paul states that pedestrianisation will increase the vibrancy of Wellington.

During her council tenure, Paul - alongside fellow Green councillor Thomas Nash - campaigned for better pay and working conditions for bus drivers. They stated that 'there is no climate action without justice for bus drivers'. The pair were supported by unions across the country and by Bus NZ. However, the private Australian equity firm which manages New Zealand's bus drivers eventually declined the pay increase Paul and Nash proposed, a result the pair claimed 'dismayed [Wellingtonians due to] the terrible treatment of our local bus drivers'.

As MP, Paul has opposed the government's plan to introduce new highways and tunnels, stating "We know that tunnels and extra lanes do nothing to provide the step change our transport system needs [...] but we will not give up on the sustainable transport that we all dream for that will allow us to move around confidently and safely."

=== Climate change ===
Paul supports greater public investment in sustainable transport and renewable energy. As a councillor, Paul held the climate change portfolio for three years where she succeeded in achieving historic investment into the Climate Implementation Plan, Te Atakura – First to Zero, an initiative which shows how New Zealand can reduce emissions by 43 per cent by 2030, and then become carbon-neutral by 2050. During her time as councillor, Paul also led investigations into how we can achieve a carbon-free future for Wellington, plans which looked at how the city can use more public transport and reduce reliance on cars.

=== Sexual violence and mental health advocacy ===
Paul is an outspoken advocate for the prevention of sexual violence and mental health issues. Paul has done a range of work in this area including supporting the Thursdays in Black campaign at Victoria University of Wellington as VUWSA president in 2019, a campaign that raises awareness of sexually harmful behaviour within the university community. During her time as VUWSA president, Paul successfully achieved extra mental health support for students. In 2020, Paul showed support for survivors who made sexual assault allegations against a group of musicians in Wellington. There were sixty survivors, some as young as 13. In 2021, Paul supported the #LetUsLive: Rally for a City Free From Sexual Violence campaign, which was organised in response to the increasing safety worries for women in Wellington, stating that "Nobody should feel afraid to walk around in their own city. This shows how fed up people are with the harassment, the assault, the inaction and being objectified despite doing nothing except trying to exist.".

As councillor, Paul held the city safety portfolio. During this time, Paul led several initiatives which aimed to increase safety for people in Wellington, including The Pōneke Promise. The Pōneke Promise is a 'community-driven partnership working to make central Wellington safe, vibrant, and welcoming', in collaboration with several different organisations including the Ministry of Social Development, NZ Police, Victoria University of Wellington and more. This project initiated many changes to Wellington, including increased lighting in some areas, after-midnight bus services, specific alcohol bans and more.

=== Justice ===
In early March 2025, Paul made remarks in a TikTok video claiming that the "vast majority" of prisoners in New Zealand prisons were imprisoned for "non violent offences that they've had to do as a response to poverty." She also stated that many prisoners had disabilities, fetal alcohol spectrum disorder and undiagnosed autism or ADHD. Paul also said that Māori were disproportionately imprisoned at a higher rate compared with other ethnic groups in New Zealand.

On 26 March 2025, Paul defended remarks that she made at an event at the University of Canterbury, stating "police beat patrols" made ethnic minority communities feel uncomfortable. Her remarks were criticised by both Labour leader Chris Hipkins and Prime Minister Christopher Luxon, with the former saying they were "ill-informed, were unwise, in fact were stupid" while the latter said the police were doing an "incredible job." In response, Paul defended her statements, citing constituency feedback about police in Wellington dumping homeless people's belongings in the rubbish and police in Hamilton detaining an autistic girl at a mental institution following a case of mistaken identity. She argued that police were not trained to deal with people in distress and drug psychosis, arguing that specialist help was needed in those situations.

Paul continued to defend her comments about beat police, saying that "Wellington people do not want to see police officers everywhere, for a lot of people it makes them feel less safe..." and stated that "they've been put in place and all they do is walk around all day waiting for homeless people to leave their spot, packing their stuff up and throwing it in the bin."

Paul received further media attention after sharing a video of her DJ set performed at 2025's CubaDupa, which included "Sound of da Police" by KRS-One, a song criticising police brutality and systemic racism.
