= Let's Get Wellington Moving =

Joint transportation initiative for Wellington, New Zealand

Let's Get Wellington Moving (LGWM) was a proposal to improve Wellington's mass transit, public transport, infrastructure in walking and cycling, and state highways to be delivered over a 20 year period. First announced in May 2019 by the Minister of Transport Phil Twyford with support from the Mayor of Wellington Justin Lester. It was run by the Wellington City Council, Greater Wellington Regional Council, and NZ Transport Agency Waka Kotahi. Light rail systems have been proposed in Wellington throughout the late-20th and early 21st centuries following the closure of the tram system in the 1950s through to the 1960s. The project was cancelled by the National-led coalition government in December 2023.

== History ==
=== Background ===
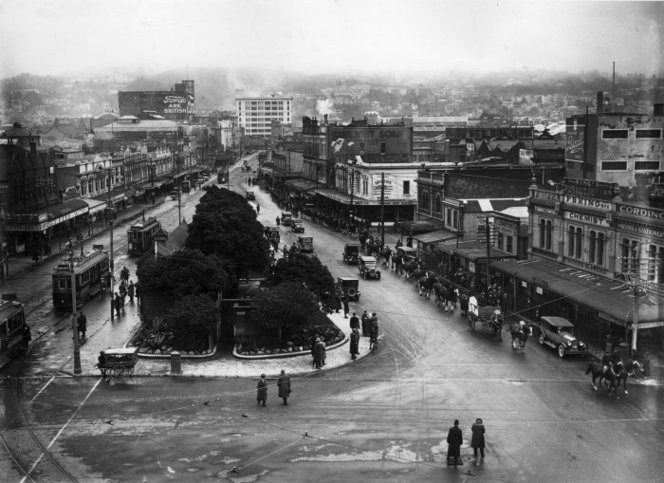
Trams on Courtenay Place in 1928

A network of electric trams served Wellington, starting operations on 30 June 1904 and ending on 2 May 1964, making it the last regular passenger service in New Zealand. Tramways covered over 52km in length at their peak. Wellington is now only operating a cable car line.

=== Initial proposals ===
Proposals for a light rail system in Wellington date back to the 1980s. In 1992, a proposal called the Superlink was a light rail line to the Wellington International Airport that incorporated the Johnsonville Line from a suburban railway to a tram-train. The plan also proposed an 800m tunnel under Mount Albert, connecting the Zoo bus terminus area and Coutts St in Kilbirnie. In 1993, a downtown/waterfront heritage tramway was part of the original Wellington Civic Trust project to develop the waterfront. The Heritage Tram plan was to run the intersection of Grey Street and Lambton Quay past the InterContinental, and then cross over Jervois Quay, through the Queens Wharf Gates, and then south along the waterfront to Oriental Parade.

In 2008, a feasibility study produced by the Greater Wellington Regional Council, the "Ngauranga to Wellington Airport Corridor Plan", outlined the possibility of light rail being used as a solution to link Wellington CBD to the airport.

Following the 2010 mayoral elections, Mayor Celia Wade-Brown pledged to investigate light rail between Wellington station and the airport. In August 2017 the Green Party updated its transport policy to introduce light rail from the city centre to Newtown by 2025 and the airport by 2027. Mayor Justin Lester reaffirmed his support for light rail along the "Golden Mile" in 2018.

== Let's Get Wellington Moving ==
=== Development of the proposal ===
The project began as an agreement between the city council, regional council, and Waka Kotahi in 2014, called the Ngāūranga to Airport Governance Group. The group proposes to put a bridge over the Basin Reserve. During the same year, an independent Board of Inquiry declined to consent to the plans. The following year it was terminated after a ruling by the High Court. The partners then created "Let's Get Wellington Moving" and began consulting with the public in 2016. The project resulted from a long-standing dispute between proponents of public transport and motorways who saw no progress for two decades. The then-new project focus extended beyond the Basin Reserve and the Airport corridor, focusing on transport behaviour change. In 2017, the Labour Government made funding for public transport a priority, and four future transport scenarios were proposed for public consultation. A 2019 study recommended adding a second two-lane Mount Victoria Tunnel for road traffic. It also explored the option of a dual-track rail tunnel to the south of the existing Mount Victoria Tunnel. Light rail line was projected with a capacity of 12,000 passengers per hour this compared to 4,000 people per hour in private vehicles.

In May 2019, Lester with Twyford announced "Let's Get Wellington Moving" a transport package worth NZ$6.4 billion. This included reducing CBD speed limits from 50 km/h to 30 km/h, except on main arterial roads. The revitalisation of Wellington's "Golden Mile" to prioritise public transport and pedestrians over private vehicles. Footpaths widened by up to 75 percent, removing most on-street carparks, and bus-only lanes in each direction would run along the stretch, with several side streets being blocked off to private vehicles. The "Golden Mile" includes the Beehive end of Lambton Quay to the end of Courtenay Place. A second Mount Victoria Tunnel was to be prioritised for buses and have dedicated facilities for walking and cycling. Mass transit line linking the railway station with the Hospital, Newtown, Miramar and the Airport. Options on which mass transit to build included electric buses, trackless trams, or light rail.

By 2020, no progress was made in planning the mass transit system; however, light rail was included in the Green Party's transport policy of 2020. In 2021, a light rail route to Island Bay via Newtown was looking to be in the short list of options presented to the public later on that year. In November 2021, the light rail and bus rapid project was officially revealed with four options on different routes that they cloud go; it also included options about improvements at the Basin Reserve and a second Mount Victoria Tunnel. The public was consulted with the options over six weeks and a proposal to expand the city's cycling network as well. In 2021, it was planned that a finalised design for the light rail would be ready in 2027 and construction would begin in 2028, and depending on the final decision, it could take 8–15 years to build. While the schedule construction for the second Mount Victoria tunnel was pushed back at least 10 years. In August of the same year, $350 million was approved for improvements in a series of works for bus priority lanes, connected cycleways through parts of the centre city, and walking improvements. In September, the city council made plans to build the Paneke Pōneke bike network plan, which was to build 147km of cycleways for Wellington over a decade. The city council would construct about 90km of the routes, while "Let's Get Wellington Moving" would build 34km of the inner-city cycleways.

=== The plans ===
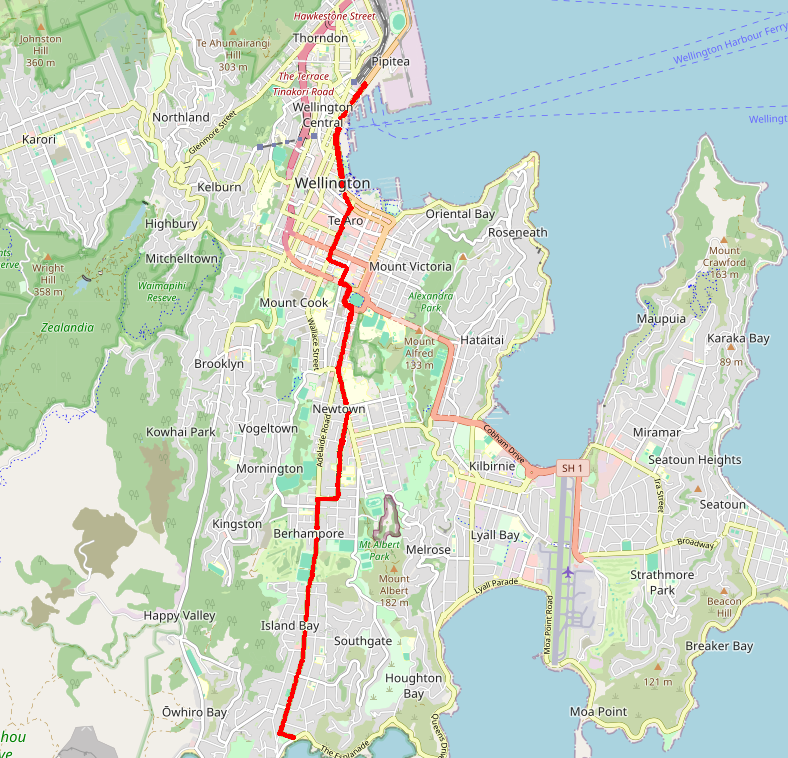
The proposed South Coast light rail, which would have been a line from the Wellington railway station to Island Bay

In 2022, the New Zealand government committed to an estimated NZ$7.4 billion project consisting of a light rail line running from the Wellington city centre to Courtenay Place then either the "southern" route past the Wellington Hospital to the south coast at Island Bay or the "eastern" route to Miramar and Wellington Airport. New Zealand's Finance Minister Grant Robertson stated that "the southern light rail option is our preferred choice for Wellington because of the significant potential it offers for new housing and neighborhood growth." A second Mount Victoria Tunnel that proposed to have two lanes for cars and two lanes for public transport. It would also see the existing Mount Victoria tunnel turned into one dedicated for walking and cycling. The city council had also approved the Paneke Pōneke bike network plan and to expanded by an extra 20km; the network would see cycleways connecting the city centre to every major suburb in the city, including Tawa and Johnsonville. The Golden Mile revitalisation design, traffic changes, and funding share were approved in June. Some of the councillors proposed withdrawing from partnership with the regional council and Waka Kotahi; a vote of no confidence was held but failed to gain majority support in the city council. Councillor Nicola Young stated that "Let's Get Wellington Moving will kill our inner city." Waka Kotahi had purchased in October 2023 land for a site for a light rail station near the Basin Reserve on the "southern" route to Island Bay. A charity was considering the site for the proposed Wellington Charity Hospital.

=== Demise ===
In September 2020, the "Let's Get Wellington Moving" board commissioned external consultants to review the program, revealing it was at risk of failing to deliver and needed to be paused to address major problems. Issues identified include under-resourcing, staff shortages, a lack of expertise, and a lack of strategic leadership, which may have persisted since its inception in 2015. Joel MacManus of The Spinoff said when "Let's Get Wellington Moving" was formed, "No one, not even the people running the show, knew what they were trying to achieve or why it existed." Other problems with the project were that it was expensive, slow with long timelines for implementation, unaccountable, organisational structure, bureaucratic inefficiency, and had bad engagement with the community.

The National Party campaigned to withdraw from "Let's Get Wellington Moving" in July 2023, saying that the plan had been "mucked around with for way too long". Chris Bishop, who developed the transport policy for National, said "Let's Get Wellington Moving" was a "toxic mess of a programme". In November 2023, the then-new National Government, under their 100-day plan, undertook to withdraw central government from "Let's Get Wellington Moving" except for the second Mount Victoria Tunnel.

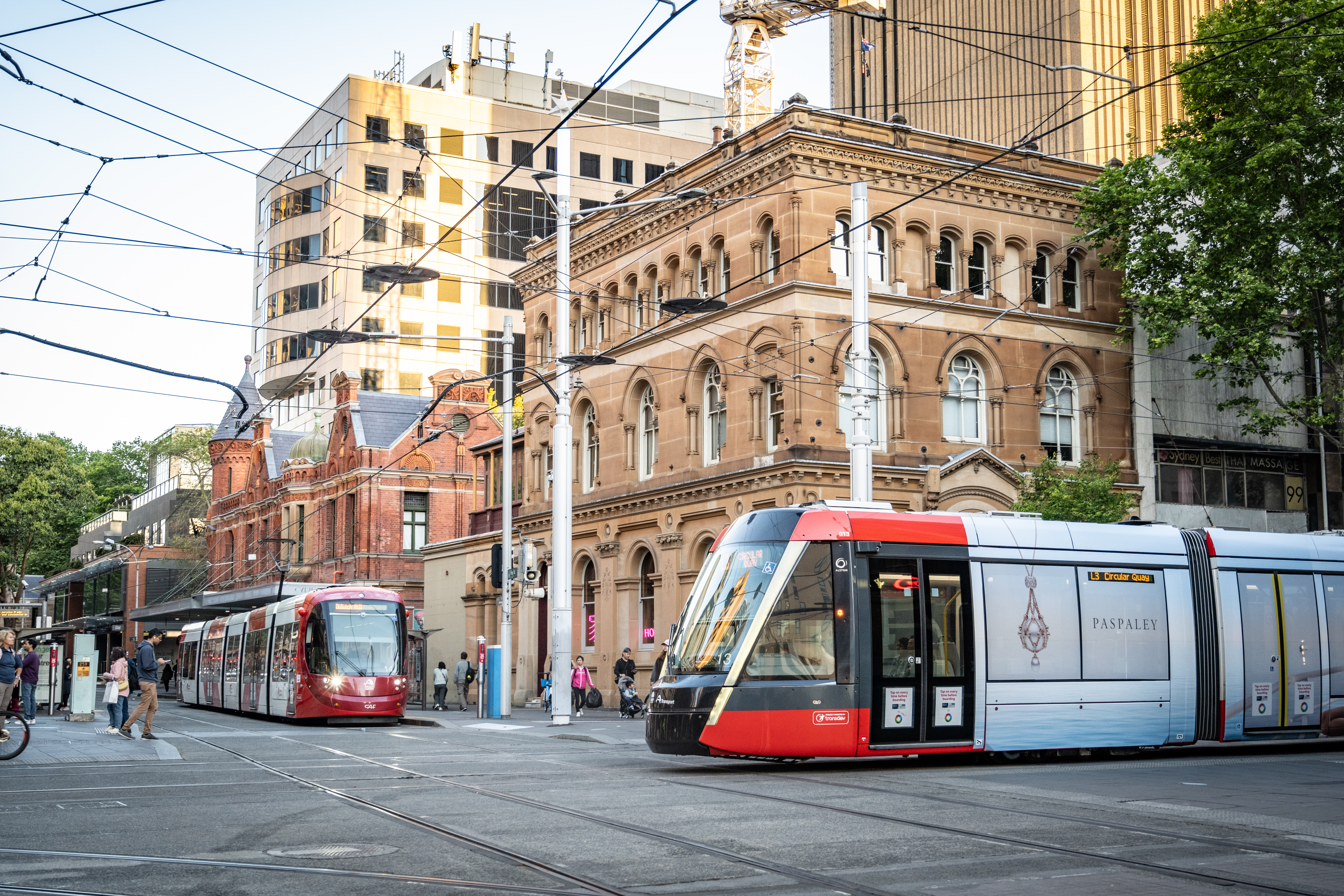
Sydney's light rail

However, Wellington mayor Tory Whanau tried to propose to both Christopher Luxon and the Minister of Transport, Simeon Brown, to head over with her to Canberra or Sydney to look at their light rail projects to try to change their minds about scrapping the plan to build a light rail line for Wellington.

The government announced in mid-December 2023 that the project would be scrapped. Simeon Brown ordered the NZTA to cease funding and work on various local council projects to promote cycling, walking, and public transportation, including "Let's Get Wellington Moving".

=== Reaction ===
Green Party transport spokeswoman Julie Anne Genter criticised the move, saying that "prioritising the Basin works and tunnel would not improve traffic flow, but would be disruptive." Tamatha Paul, Wellington Central MP, said, "All people want is a bus that shows up on time, decent pay for bus drivers, and to move around without having to worry about their safety." Project manager of Cycling Action Network, Patrick Morgan, said new plans for transport in Wellington "are a hodgepodge of failed ideas from the 1960s", and "Everyone except the government knows you simply can't build your way out of congestion." Whanau said "It will do nothing to grow the city, make it more liveable or tackle the climate crisis. Ramming through a four-lane highway and tunnel won't win the votes of Wellingtonians who have shown consistent support for light rail in the city."

== Legacy ==
On 17 December 2023, the Government agreed with the NZ Transport Agency Waka Kotahi, the Wellington City Council and the Greater Wellington Regional Council to halt "Let's Get Wellington Moving". As part of the agreement, the Government agreed to fully fund the Basin Reserve upgrade while the Wellington City Council would take over responsibility over for the Thorndon Quay Hutt Road projects and the Golden Mile revitalisation.

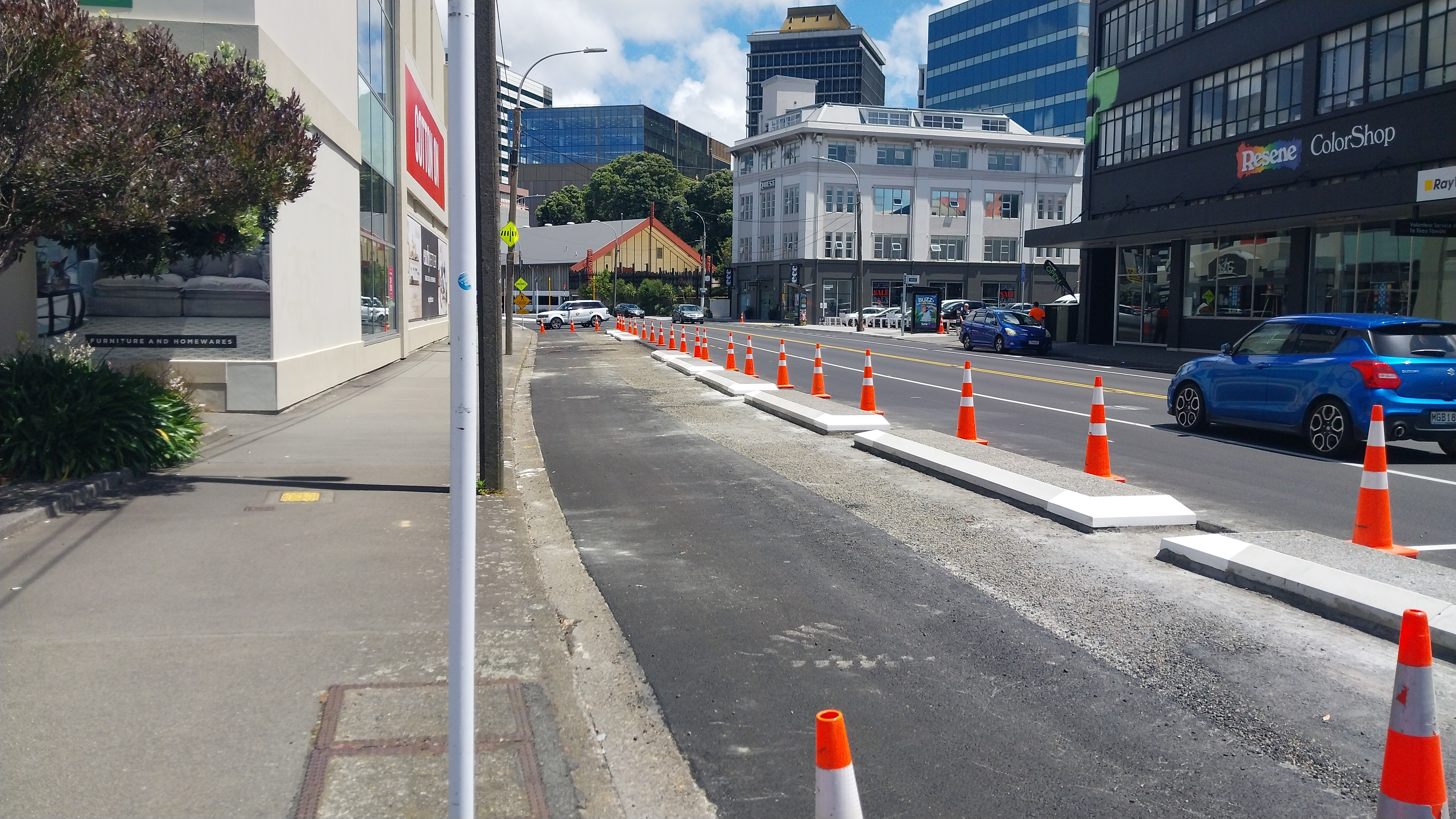
Construction of the cycleways on Thorndon Quay, 2024

The disestablishment of the "Let's Get Wellington Moving" had no impact on the Golden Mile and Thorndon Quay Hutt Road projects because the NZTA Board already approved funding for these projects in July 2023. The decision to proceed was with Wellington City Council discretion. A few consultancy contracts were transferred to the City Council and the remainder expired or were terminated. The "Let's Get Wellington Moving" programme spent $180.7 million from July 2015 to March 2024, with $109.7 million borne by NZTA.

Before the dissolution of "Let's Get Wellington Moving," some of its programs were built, were in construction, or soon to begin construction. A pedestrian crossing on Cobham Drive was the first infrastructure project completed but was surrounded by controversy from businesses across Wellington. Then the Aotea Quay roundabout, which replaced the old traffic lights, was completed in April 2024. Late 2023 construction begun on Thorndon Quay to build cycleways, signalised pedestrian crossings, and peak hour bus lanes. Construction of the Golden Mile revitalisation is planned to start in 4 May 2025 on Cambridge and Kent Terrace.

== See also ==
- Trams in New Zealand
- Public transport in the Wellington Region
- Wellington tramway system
- Johnsonville Line (conversion to light rail was an option considered in 2008)
- Light rail in Auckland
