= Bike rental =

Business that rents bicycles for short periods of time

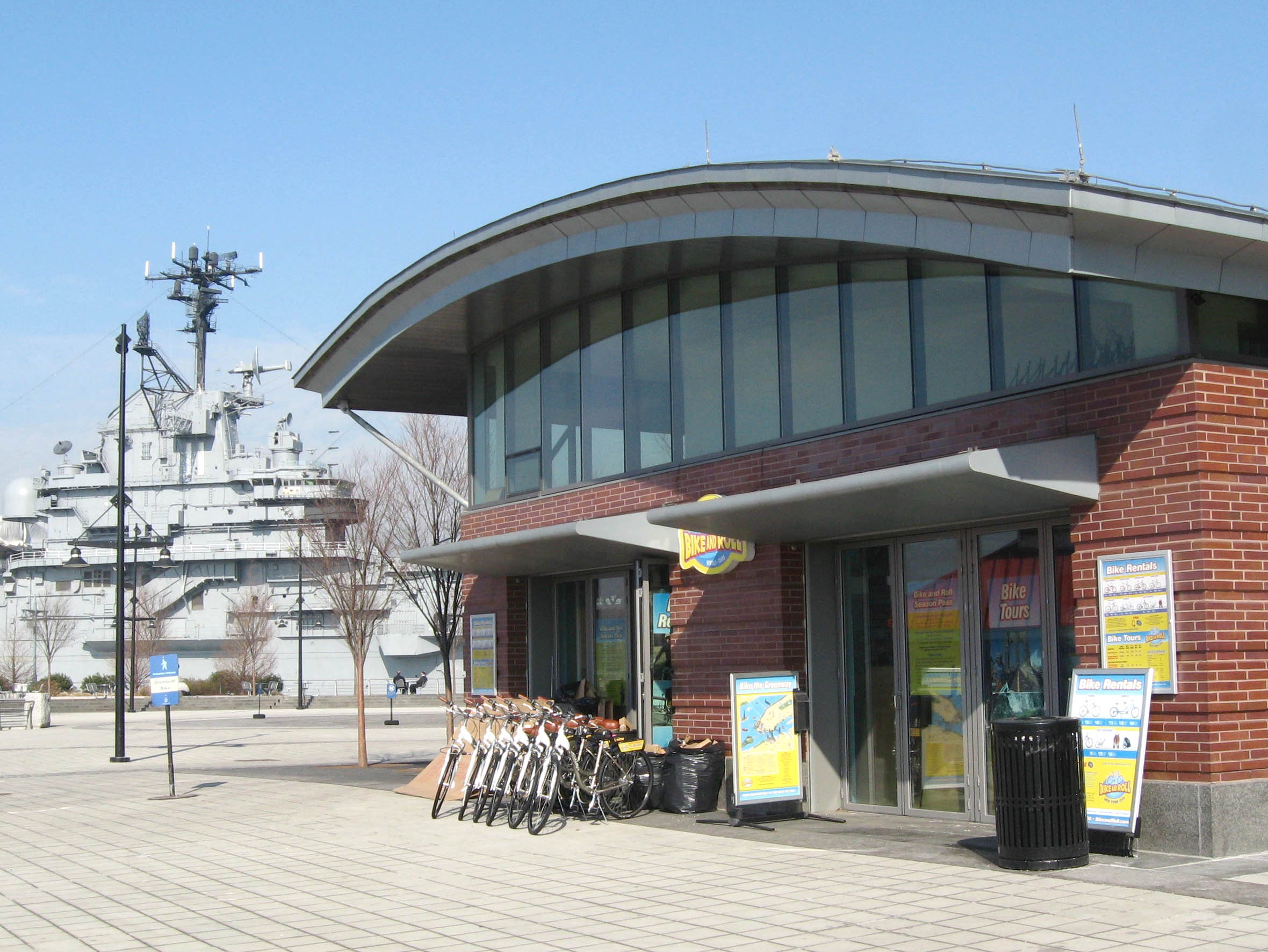
Rental shop in tourist area

A bike rental or bike hire business rents out bicycles for short periods of time, usually for a few hours. Most rentals are provided by bike shops as a sideline to their main businesses of sales and service, but some shops specialize in rentals.

As with car rental, bicycle rental shops primarily serve people who do not have access to a vehicle, typically travellers and particularly tourists. Specialized bicycle rental shops therefore typically operate at beaches, parks, or other locations that tourists frequent. In this case, the fees are set to encourage renting the bikes for a few hours at a time, rarely more than a day.

Bicycle sharing systems allow members to sign out a bike from any public station, returning it to another at the end of their trip.

== Share schemes ==
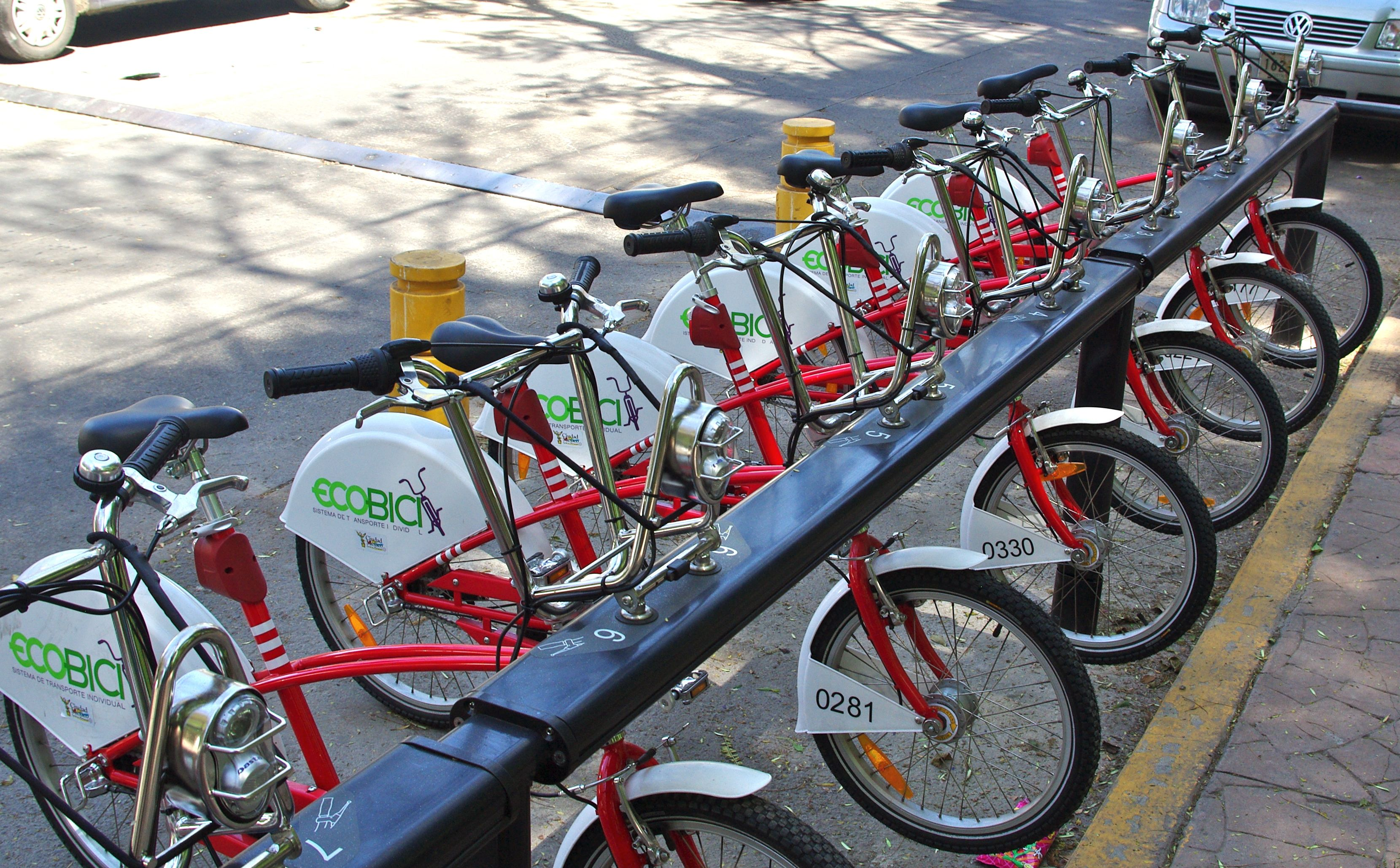
Bicycles available for rental in Mexico City, March 2010

Bicycle sharing systems provide access to vehicles for a short period of time. They have distinctive access schemes; some provide free access to members and others charge a monthly or yearly fee. Some schemes operate stations across an entire city, serve members only, and are targeted to commuters. A user can purchase a yearly or monthly pass that provides access to a bike with a smart card. Most such systems allow a member to sign out a bike from any station for up to half an hour of free use, enough for most commuters to travel to their destination where they can drop off the bike at any station.

Many bike sharing schemes start charging fees after the first free half hour in order to encourage the user to return the bicycle at the end of each trip, and take another bicycle for the next trip, rather than keeping a bicycle out continuously. However, many bicycle sharing systems offer daily or weekly memberships which permit their use by tourists, visitors, and other occasional users.
